= List of delegates to the Continental Congress =

The Continental Congress was initially a convention of delegates from several British American colonies at the height of the American Revolution era, who spoke and acted collectively for the people of the Thirteen Colonies that ultimately became the United States. The term mostly refers to the First Continental Congress of 1774 and the Second Continental Congress of 1775–1781. It also refers to the Congress of the Confederation of 1781–1789, which covers the period following the establishment of American independence with the end of the Revolutionary War. During this period, the Continental Congress served as the chief legislative and executive body of the U.S. government.

The unicameral Congress of the Confederation, officially styled "The United States in Congress Assembled," delegates elected by the legislature of the various states. The Confederation Congress was the immediate successor to the Second Continental Congress; and delegates to it were similarly chosen. Many of the delegates to the initial 1775 session of the Second Continental Congress had also attended the previous First Continental Congress. Altogether, The Biographical Directory of the United States Congress lists 343 men who served as delegates to the Continental Congress in three incarnations from 1774 to 1789; also listed are another 90 persons who were elected as delegates but never served.

== Background ==
Convened in response to the Intolerable Acts passed by the British Parliament earlier that year, the 56 delegates to the First Continental Congress sought to help repair the frayed relationship between the British government and its American colonies. They passed the Continental Association, an economic boycott of Great Britain, and petitioned the king for a redress of grievances. They also resolved to reconvene in May 1775 if necessary.

Delegates from the various colonies did indeed reconvene for a Second Continental Congress as scheduled, but by the time they gathered, the Revolutionary War had begun. Moderates in the Congress still hoped that the colonies could be reconciled with Great Britain, but a movement towards independence steadily gained ground. At this juncture Congress simultaneously sent an Olive Branch Petition to King George III, hoping for a rapprochement, and issued a Declaration of the Causes and Necessity of Taking Up Arms, which contained the words "Our cause is just. Our union is perfect... being with one mind resolved to die freemen rather than to live slaves...".

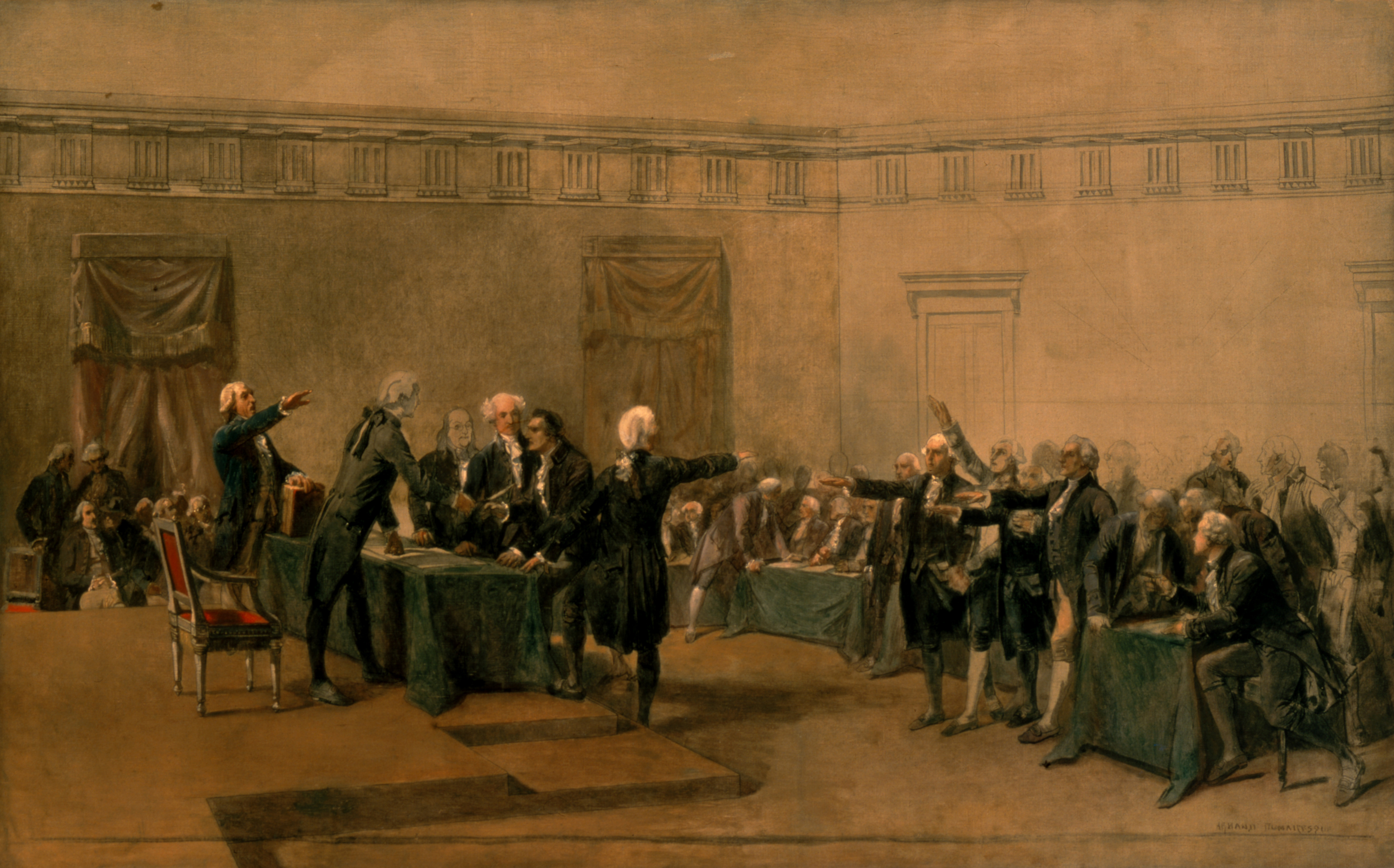
Signing of Declaration of Independence by Charles Édouard Armand-Dumaresq, c.1873

Congress functioned as a de facto national government from the outset by establishing the Continental Army, directing strategy, and appointing diplomats. It eventually adopted the Lee Resolution which established the new country on July 2, 1776, and it agreed to the Declaration of Independence two days later.

Afterward, the Congress functioned as the provisional government of the United States through March 1, 1781. During this period, in addition to successfully managing the war effort, its primary achievements included: drafting the Articles of Confederation, the first U.S. Constitution; securing diplomatic recognition and support from foreign nations; and resolving state land claims west of the Appalachian Mountains. When the Articles of Confederation came into force on March 1, 1781, after being ratified by all 13 states, the Continental Congress became the Congress of the Confederation, which helped guide the new nation through the final stages of the Revolutionary War. Under the Articles, the Confederation Congress had limited power. It could declare war, sign treaties, and settle disputes between the states. It could also borrow or print money, but did not have the power to tax; nor could it compel the individual states to comply with its decisions. It convened in eight sessions (a ninth failed to achieve a quorum) prior to being supplanted in 1789, when the United States Congress became the nation's legislative branch of government under a new Constitution.

== Article V of the Articles of Confederation ==
Article V of the Articles of Confederation for the annual election of delegates to Congress by legislatures of the various states to terms that commenced on the first Monday in November, in every year. Each state could send 2–7 delegates, and no person was permitted to serve as a delegate for more than three years within a span of six years. State legislatures also had the authority to recall or to replace its delegates at any time. Prior to 1781, delegates to the Continental Congress served at the pleasure of the state legislature that commissioned them; neither term limits nor specific start– / end–date of service existed.

For the most convenient management of the general interests of the United States, delegates shall be annually appointed in such manner as the legislatures of each State shall direct, to meet in Congress on the first Monday in November, in every year, with a power reserved to each State to recall its delegates, or any of them, at any time within the year, and to send others in their stead for the remainder of the year.

No State shall be represented in Congress by less than two, nor more than seven members; and no person shall be capable of being a delegate for more than three years in any term of six years; nor shall any person, being a delegate, be capable of holding any office under the United States, for which he, or another for his benefit, receives any salary, fees or emolument of any kind.

Each State shall maintain its own delegates in a meeting of the States, and while they act as members of the committee of the States.

In determining questions in the United States in Congress assembled, each State shall have one vote.

Freedom of speech and debate in Congress shall not be impeached or questioned in any court or place out of Congress, and the members of Congress shall be protected in their persons from arrests or imprisonments, during the time of their going to and from, and attendance on Congress, except for treason, felony, or breach of the peace.

== Elected delegates who participated ==
The following tables list the 343 people who served in Congress: 1st Continental, 2nd Continental, or Confederation, between 1774 and 1789, as well as the year(s) of their active participation.

=== Connecticut ===
Delegates from Connecticut
Name	1st Continental Congress	2nd Continental Congress	Confederation Congress
Andrew Adams		1778	
Joseph Platt Cooke			1784–1785; 1787–1788
Silas Deane	1774	1775–1776	
Eliphalet Dyer	1774	1775–1779	1782–1783
Pierpont Edwards			1788
Oliver Ellsworth		1778–1781	1781–1783
Titus Hosmer		1778	
Benjamin Huntington		1780	1782–1783; 1788
Samuel Huntington		1776; 1778–1781	1781; 1783
William Samuel Johnson			1785–1787
Richard Law		1777	1781–1782
Stephen Mix Mitchell			1785–1788
Jesse Root		1778–1781	1781–1782
Roger Sherman	1774	1775–1781	1781; 1783–1784
Joseph Spencer		1779	
Jonathan Sturges			1786
James Wadsworth			1784
Jeremiah Wadsworth			1788
William Williams		1776–1777	
Oliver Wolcott		1776–1778; 1781	1781–1783
Source (unless otherwise noted):

=== Delaware ===
Delegates from Delaware
Name	1st Continental Congress	2nd Continental Congress	Confederation Congress
Gunning Bedford Jr.			1783–1785
John Dickinson (Note: John Dickinson served as a delegate from Pennsylvania to the 1st Continental Congress (1774). He also served twice in the 2nd Continental Congress, first as a delegate from Pennsylvania (1775–76), and then as a delegate from Delaware (1779).)		1779	
Philemon Dickinson			1782–1783
Dyre Kearney			1787–1788
Eleazer McComb			1783–1784
Thomas McKean	1774	1775–1776; 1778–1781	1781–1782
Nathaniel Mitchell			1787–1788
John Patten			1786
William Peery			1786
George Read	1774	1775–1777	
Caesar Rodney	1774	1775–1776	
Thomas Rodney			1781–1782; 1786
James Sykes		1777	
James Tilton			1783–1784
Nicholas Van Dyke		1777–1781	1781
John Vining			1784–1785
Samuel Wharton			1782–1783
Source (unless otherwise noted):

=== Georgia ===
Delegates from Georgia
Name	1st Continental Congress	2nd Continental Congress	Confederation Congress
Abraham Baldwin			1785; 1787–1788
Nathan Brownson		1777	
Archibald Bulloch		1775	
William Few		1780–1781	1781–1782; 1786–1788
William Gibbons			1784
Button Gwinnett		1776	
John Habersham			1785
Lyman Hall		1775–1777	
John Houstoun		1775	
William Houstoun			1784–1786
Richard Howly		1780–1781	1781
Noble Wimberly Jones			1781–1782
Edward Langworthy		1777–1779	
William Pierce		1778; 1780–1781	1781–1782
Edward Telfair		1778; 1780–1781	1781–1782
George Walton		1776–1777; 1780–1781	1781
John Walton		1778	
Joseph Wood		1777–1778	
John Joachim Zubly		1775	
Source (unless otherwise noted):

=== Maryland ===
Delegates from Maryland
Name	1st Continental Congress	2nd Continental Congress	Confederation Congress
Robert Alexander		1776	
William Carmichael		1778–1779	
Charles Carroll ("Barrister")		1776–1777	
Charles Carroll ("of Carrollton")		1776; 1777–1778; 1780	
Daniel Carroll			1781–1783
Jeremiah Chase			1783–1784
Samuel Chase	1774	1775–1778	1784; 1785
Benjamin Contee			1788
James Forbes		1778–1780	
Uriah Forrest			1787
Robert Goldsborough	1774	1775–1776	
John Hall		1775	
John Hanson		1780–1781	1781–1782
William Harrison Jr.			1786
William Hemsley			1782–1783
John Henry		1778–1780	1785–1786
William Hindman			1785–1786
John Eager Howard			1788
Daniel of St. Thomas Jenifer		1779; 1780–1781	1781
Thomas Johnson	1774	1775–1777	
Thomas Sim Lee			1783
Edward Lloyd			1783–1784
James McHenry			1783–1785
William Paca	1774	1775–1779	
George Plater		1778–1780	
Richard Potts			1781
Nathaniel Ramsey			1786–1787
John Rogers		1775–1776	
David Ross			1787–1789
Benjamin Rumsey		1776–1777	
Joshua Seney			1788
William Smith		1777	
Thomas Stone		1775–1776; 1778	1784
Matthew Tilghman	1774	1775–1776	
Turbutt Wright			1782
Source (unless otherwise noted):

=== Massachusetts Bay ===
Delegates from Massachusetts
Name	1st Continental Congress	2nd Continental Congress	Confederation Congress
John Adams	1774	1775–1777	
Samuel Adams	1774	1775–1781	1781
Thomas Cushing	1774	1775–1776	
Francis Dana		1777–1778	1784
Nathan Dane			1785–1788
Elbridge Gerry		1776–1780	1783–1785
Nathaniel Gorham			1782–1783; 1785–1787
John Hancock		1775–1778	
Stephen Higginson			1783
Samuel Holten		1778–1780	1783–1785; 1787
Jonathan Jackson			1782
Rufus King			1784–1787
James Lovell		1777–1781	1781–1782
John Lowell			1782
Samuel Osgood			1781–1784
Samuel Allyne Otis			1787–1788
Robert Treat Paine	1774	1775–1776	
George Partridge		1779–1781	1781–1785
Theodore Sedgwick			1785–1786; 1788
George Thatcher			1787–1789
Artemas Ward		1780–1781	1781
Source (unless otherwise noted):

=== New Hampshire ===
Delegates from New Hampshire
Name	1st Continental Congress	2nd Continental Congress	Confederation Congress
Josiah Bartlett		1775–1776; 1778	
Jonathan Blanchard			1784
Nathaniel Folsom	1774	1777–1780	
Abiel Foster			1783–1785
George Frost		1777–1779	
John Taylor Gilman			1782–1783
Nicholas Gilman			1787–1789
John Langdon		1775–1776	1787
Woodbury Langdon		1779	
Samuel Livermore		1780–1781	1781–1782; 1785–1786
Pierse Long			1785–1786
Nathaniel Peabody		1779–1780	
John Sullivan	1774	1775–1775; 1780–1781	1781
Matthew Thornton		1776–1777	
John Wentworth Jr.		1778	
William Whipple		1776–1779	
Phillips White			1782–1783
Paine Wingate			1788
Source (unless otherwise noted):

=== New Jersey ===
Delegates from New Jersey
Name	1st Continental Congress	2nd Continental Congress	Confederation Congress
John Beatty			1784–1785
Elias Boudinot		1778	1781–1783
William Burnet		1780–1781	1781
Lambert Cadwalader			1785–1787
Abraham Clark		1776–1778; 1780–1781	1781–1783; 1786–1788
Silas Condict			1781–1783
Stephen Crane	1774	1775–1776	
Jonathan Dayton			1787–1788
John De Hart	1774	1775–1776	
Samuel Dick			1784–1785
Jonathan Elmer		1777–1778	1781–1783; 1787–1788
John Fell		1778–1780	
Frederick Frelinghuysen		1778–1779	1782–1783
John Hart		1776	
Francis Hopkinson		1776	
Josiah Hornblower			1785–1786
William Houston		1779–1781	1784–1785
James Kinsey	1774	1775	
William Livingston	1774	1775–1776	
James Schureman			1786–1787
Nathaniel Scudder		1778–1779	
Jonathan Sergeant		1776–1777	
Richard Smith	1774	1775–1776	
John Stevens			1784
Charles Stewart			1784–1785
Richard Stockton		1776	
John Cleves Symmes			1785–1786
John Witherspoon		1776–1781	1781–1782
Source (unless otherwise noted):

=== New York ===
Delegates from New York
Name	1st Continental Congress	2nd Continental Congress	Confederation Congress
John Alsop	1774	1775–1776	
Egbert Benson			1784; 1787–1788
Simon Boerum	1774	1775	
George Clinton		1775–1776	
Charles DeWitt			1784
James Duane	1774	1775–1781	1781–1783
William Duer		1777–1778	
William Floyd	1774	1775–1776; 1779–1781	1781–1783
Leonard Gansevoort			1788
David Gelston			1789
Alexander Hamilton			1782–1783; 1788
John Haring	1774		1785–1787
John Jay	1774	1775–1778	
John Lansing Jr.			1785
John Laurance			1785–1787
Francis Lewis		1775–1779	
Ezra L'Hommedieu		1779–1781	1781–1783; 1788
Philip Livingston	1774	1775–1778	
Robert R. Livingston		1775–1776; 1779–1780	1784
Walter Livingston			1784–1785
Isaac Low	1774		
Alexander McDougall			1781
Gouverneur Morris		1778–1779	
Lewis Morris		1775–1777	
Ephraim Paine			1784
Philip Pell			1789
Zephaniah Platt			1785–1786
Philip Schuyler		1775; 1777; 1779–1780	
John Morin Scott		1780; 1782	1781–1783
Melancton Smith			1785–1787
Henry Wisner	1774	1775–1776	
Abraham Yates			1787–1788
Peter W. Yates			1786
Source (unless otherwise noted):

=== North Carolina ===
Delegates from North Carolina
Name	1st Continental Congress	2nd Continental Congress	Confederation Congress
John B. Ashe			1787
Timothy Bloodworth			1786
William Blount			1782–1783; 1786–1787
Thomas Burke		1777–1781	1781
Robert Burton			1787
Richard Caswell	1774	1775	
William Cumming			1785
Cornelius Harnett		1777–1779	
Benjamin Hawkins			1781–1783; 1787
Joseph Hewes	1774	1775–1776; 1779	
Whitmell Hill		1778–1780	
William Hooper	1774	1775–1777	
Samuel Johnston		1780–1781	1781
Allen Jones		1779–1780	
Willie Jones		1780	
Abner Nash			1782–1783
John Penn		1775–1780	
William Sharpe		1779–1781	1781
John Sitgreaves			1785
Richard Dobbs Spaight			1783–1785
John Swann			1788
James White			1786–1788
John Williams		1778–1779	
Hugh Williamson			1782–1785; 1787–1788
Source (unless otherwise noted):

=== Pennsylvania ===
Delegates from Pennsylvania
Name	1st Continental Congress	2nd Continental Congress	Confederation Congress
Andrew Allen		1775–1776	
John Armstrong Sr.		1779–1780	
John Armstrong Jr.			1787–1788
Samuel John Atlee		1778–1781	1781–1782
John Bubenheim Bayard			1785–1786
Edward Biddle	1774	1775	
William Bingham			1786–1788
William Clingan		1777–1779	
George Clymer		1776–1777; 1780–1781	1781–1782
Tench Coxe			1788–1789
John Dickinson	1774	1775–1776	
Thomas Fitzsimons			1782–1783
Benjamin Franklin		1775–1776	
Joseph Galloway	1774		
Joseph Gardner			1784–1785
Edward Hand			1783–1784
William Henry			1784–1785
Charles Humphreys	1774	1775–1776	
Jared Ingersoll		1780	
William Irvine			1787–1788
David Jackson			1785–1786
Timothy Matlack		1780	
James McLene		1779–1780	
Samuel Meredith			1786–1788
Thomas Mifflin	1774	1775	1782–1784
John Montgomery			1782–1784
Joseph Montgomery		1780–1781	1781–1782
Cadwalader Morris			1783–1784
Robert Morris		1775–1778	
John Morton	1774	1775–1776	
Frederick Muhlenberg		1779–1780	
Richard Peters Jr.			1782–1783
Charles Pettit			1785–1787
Joseph Reed		1778	
James Randolph Reid			1787–1789
Samuel Rhoads	1774		
Daniel Roberdeau		1777–1779	
George Ross	1774	1775–1777	
Benjamin Rush		1776–1777	
James Searle		1778–1780	
William Shippen		1778–1780	
James Smith		1776–1778	
Jonathan Bayard Smith		1778	
Thomas Smith			1781–1782
Arthur St. Clair			1786–1787
George Taylor		1776	
Thomas Willing		1775–1776	
James Wilson		1775–1777	1782–1783; 1785–1787
Henry Wynkoop		1779–1781	1781–1782
Source (unless otherwise noted):

=== Rhode Island and Providence Plantations ===
Delegates from Rhode Island
Name	1st Continental Congress	2nd Continental Congress	Confederation Congress
Jonathan Arnold			1782–1783
Peleg Arnold			1787–1788
John Collins		1778–1780	1782–1783
Ezekiel Cornell		1780–1781	1781–1782
William Ellery		1776–1781	1781–1785
John Gardner			1789
Jonathan Hazard			1788
Stephen Hopkins	1774	1775–1776	
David Howell			1782–1785
James Manning			1786
Henry Marchant		1777–1779	
Nathan Miller			1786
Daniel Mowry Jr.		1780–1781	1781–1782
James Mitchell Varnum		1780–1781	1781; 1787
Samuel Ward	1774	1775–1776	
Source (unless otherwise noted):

=== South Carolina ===
Delegates from South Carolina
Name	1st Continental Congress	2nd Continental Congress	Confederation Congress
Robert Barnwell			1789
Thomas Bee		1780–1781	1781–1782
Richard Beresford			1783–1784
John Bull			1784–1787
Pierce Butler			1787
William Henry Drayton		1778–1779	
Nicholas Eveleigh			1781–1782
Christopher Gadsden	1774	1775–1776	
John Lewis Gervais			1782–1783
Thomas Heyward Jr.		1776–1778	
Daniel Huger			1786–1788
Richard Hutson		1778–1779	
Ralph Izard			1782–1783
John Kean			1785–1787
Francis Kinloch		1780	
Henry Laurens		1777–1780	
Thomas Lynch	1774	1775–1776	
Thomas Lynch Jr.		1775–1776	
John Mathews		1778–1781	1781
Arthur Middleton		1776–1777	1781–1782
Henry Middleton	1774	1775	
Isaac Motte		1780–1781	1781–1782
John Parker			1786–1788
Charles Pinckney			1785–1787
David Ramsay			1782–1783, 1785–1786
Jacob Read			1783–1785
Edward Rutledge	1774	1775–1776	
John Rutledge	1774	1775–1776	1782–1783
Thomas Tudor Tucker			1787–1788
Source (unless otherwise noted):

=== Virginia ===
Delegates from Virginia
Name	1st Continental Congress	2nd Continental Congress	Confederation Congress
Thomas Adams		1778–1779	
John Banister		1778	
Richard Bland	1774	1775	
Theodorick Bland		1780–1781	1781–1783
Carter Braxton		1776	
John Brown			1787–1788
Edward Carrington			1786–1788
John Dawson			1788–1789
William Fitzhugh		1779	
William Fleming		1779	
William Grayson			1784–1787
Cyrus Griffin		1778–1780	1787–1788
Samuel Hardy			1783–1785
Benjamin Harrison	1774	1775–1778	
John Harvie		1777–1778	
James Henry		1780	
Patrick Henry	1774	1775	
Thomas Jefferson		1775–1776	1783–1784
Joseph Jones		1777; 1780–1781	1781–1783
Arthur Lee			1782–1784
Francis Lightfoot Lee		1775–1779	
Henry Lee			1786–1788
Richard Henry Lee	1774	1775–1779	1784–1785; 1787
James Madison		1780–1781	1781–1783; 1787–1788
James Mercer		1779	
John Francis Mercer			1783–1784
James Monroe			1783–1786
Thomas Nelson Jr.		1775–1777; 1779	
Mann Page		1777	
Edmund Pendleton	1774	1775	
Edmund Randolph		1779	1781–1782
Peyton Randolph	1774	1775	
Meriwether Smith		1778; 1780–1781	1781
John Walker		1780	
George Washington	1774	1775	
George Wythe		1775–1776	
Source (unless otherwise noted):

== Elected delegates who did not participate ==
The following table lists the 90 people who were elected to Congress: 1st Continental, 2nd Continental, or Confederation, between 1774 and 1789, but who did not participate, as well as the year(s) of their election.

Name	State	Year(s) elected
Benjamin Andrew	Georgia	1780
Samuel Ashley	New Hampshire	1779
George Atkinson	New Hampshire	1780, 1785
John Barnwell	South Carolina	1784
Gunning Bedford Sr.	Delaware	1786
Benjamin Bellows	New Hampshire	1781
John Blair, Jr.	Virginia	1781
James Bowdoin	Massachusetts	1774
William Bradford	Rhode Island	1776
Ephraim Brevard	North Carolina	1781
John Brown	Rhode Island	1784, 1785
John Canfield	Connecticut	1786
George Champlin	Rhode Island	1785, 1786
Charles C. Chandler	Connecticut	1784
John Chester	Connecticut	1787, 1788
Matthew Clarkson	Pennsylvania	1785
Joseph Clay	Georgia	1778
John Cooper	New Jersey	1776
Tristram Dalton	Massachusetts	1783, 1784
Timothy Danielson	Massachusetts	1780, 1782, 1783
Elias Dayton	New Jersey	1778
Moses Dow	New Hampshire	1784
Samuel Duffield	Pennsylvania	1777
Timothy Edwards	Massachusetts	1778
Samuel Elbert	Georgia	1784
John Evans	Delaware	1776
Sylvester Gardner	Rhode Island	1787
Edward Giles	Maryland	1782
Alexander Gillon	South Carolina	1784
Isaac Grantham	Delaware	1787
James Gunn	Georgia	1787
Joseph Habersham	Georgia	1784
John Hathorn	New York	1788
Thomas Henderson	New Jersey	1779
James Hillhouse	Connecticut	1786, 1788
William Hillhouse	Connecticut	1783, 1785
Thomas Holden	Rhode Island	1788, 1789
Charles Johnson	North Carolina	1781, 1784, 1785
Gabriel Jones	Virginia	1779
Samuel Jones	New York	1788
Henry Latimer	Delaware	1784
Levi Lincoln	Massachusetts	1781
Rawlins Lowndes	South Carolina	1779
Nathaniel Macon	North Carolina	1785
Daniel Manton	Rhode Island	1787
Alexander Martin	North Carolina	1786
Luther Martin	Virginia	1784
George Mason	Virginia	1777
Joseph McDowell	North Carolina	1787
Lachlan McIntosh	Georgia	1784
John McKinly	Delaware	1784
William Montgomery	Pennsylvania	1784
William Moore	Pennsylvania	1777
William Moultrie	South Carolina	1784
Paul Mumford	Rhode Island	1785
John Neilson	New Jersey	1778
Joseph Nicholson	Maryland	1777
William O'Bryen	Georgia	1789
Adlai Osborne	North Carolina	1784
Henry Osborne	Georgia	1786
William Paterson	New Jersey	1780, 1787
Samuel Patterson	Delaware	1784
Elisha Payne	New Hampshire	1784
Nathaniel Pendleton	Georgia	1789
Thomas Person	North Carolina	1784
Peter Phillips	Rhode Island	1785
John Pickering	New Hampshire	1787
William Pitkin	Connecticut	1784
Thomas Polk	North Carolina	1786
Richard Ridgely	Maryland	1784, 1785
Gustavus Scott	Maryland	1784
William Smallwood	Maryland	1784
Benjamin Smith	North Carolina	1784
John Sparhawk	New Hampshire	1786
Samuel Stirk	Georgia	1781
John Stokes	North Carolina	1787
Caleb Strong	Massachusetts	1780
Jedediah Strong	Connecticut	1782, 1784, 1784
James Sullivan	Massachusetts	1782, 1783
Thomas Sumter	South Carolina	1783
Ebenezer Thompson	New Hampshire	1778, 1783
John Treadwell	Connecticut	1784, 1785, 1787
Paul Trapier	South Carolina	1777
Joseph Trumbull	Connecticut	1774
Timothy Walker Jr.	New Hampshire	1777, 1778, 1782, 1785
James Warren	Massachusetts	1782
Joshua Wentworth	New York	1779
Benjamin West	New Hampshire	1787
Stephen West	Virginia	1780
Erastus Wolcott	North Carolina	1774, 1787, 1788
Source (unless otherwise noted):

== See also ==
- Founding Fathers of the United States, includes a listing of which Founding Fathers signed one or more of the era's formative state documents
- Journals of the Continental Congress
- Charles Thomson, secretary of the Continental Congress
- History of the United States (1776–1789)
- Perpetual Union
