= 1788 Massachusetts Senate election =

Elections to the Massachusetts Senate

Elections to the Massachusetts Senate were held in 1788 to elect 40 State Senators. Candidates were elected at the county level, with some counties electing multiple Senators.

For election, a candidate needed the support of a majority of those voting. If a seat remained vacant because no candidate received such a majority, the Massachusetts General Court was empowered to fill it by a majority vote of its members.

== Apportionment ==
The apportionment of seats by population was as follows:

- Barnstable County: 1
- Berkshire County: 2
- Bristol County: 3
- Cumberland County: 1
- Dukes and Nantucket Counties: 1
- Essex County: 6
- Hampshire County: 4
- Lincoln County: 1
- Middlesex County: 5
- Plymouth County: 3
- Suffolk County: 6
- Worcester County: 5
- York County: 2

== Results ==
=== Barnstable ===
1788 Barnstable Senate election
Party	Candidate	Votes	%
Unknown	Solomon Freeman	231	50.55
Unknown	Thomas Smith (incumbent)	–	–
Total votes		457	100.00

Exact totals for Smith, the incumbent Senator, are unknown.

=== Berkshire ===
1788 Berkshire Senate election
Party	Candidate	Votes	%
Unknown	William Whiting	833	58.21
Unknown	Thompson J. Skinner (incumbent)	609	42.56
Unknown	Elijah Dwight (incumbent)	576	40.25
Total votes		1,431	100.00

William Williams, Ebenezer Pierce, John Bacon, and William Walker also received votes, though exact totals are unknown.

Dwight was subsequently elected by the General Court.

=== Bristol ===
1788 Bristol Senate election
Party	Candidate	Votes	%
Unknown	Holder Slocum (incumbent)	991	58.78
Unknown	Phanuel Bishop (incumbent)	981	58.19
Unknown	Abraham White	973	57.71
Total votes		1,686	100.00

Thomas Durfee, Walter Spooner, and Elisha May also received votes, but their exact totals are unknown.

=== Cumberland ===
1788 Cumberland Senate election
Party	Candidate	Votes	%
Unknown	Josiah Thacher	396	61.30
Scattering	All others	250	38.70
Total votes		646	100.00

=== Dukes and Nantucket ===
1788 Dukes and Nantucket Senate election
Party	Candidate	Votes	%
Unknown	Matthew Mayhew	95	100.00
Total votes		95	100.00

=== Essex ===
1788 Essex Senate election
Party	Candidate	Votes	%
Federalist	Tristram Dalton	2,053	79.11
Federalist	Benjamin Goodhue	1,988	76.61
Federalist	Azor Orne	1,980	76.30
Federalist	Samuel Phillips Jr.	1,939	74.72
Federalist	Stephen Choate	1,719	66.24
Federalist	Samuel Holten	1,157	44.59
Federalist	Jonathan Greenleaf	934	35.99
Anti-Federalist	Peter Osgood Jr.	–	–
Anti-Federalist	Daniel Kilham	–	–
Anti-Federalist	Israel Hutchinson	–	–
Anti-Federalist	Aaron Wood	–	–
Anti-Federalist	John Manning	–	–
Anti-Federalist	Richard Ward	–	–
Total votes		2,595	100.00

Exact totals for the Anti-Federalist ticket were not listed.

Unaffiliated candidates Peter Coffin and John Choate also received votes, but their exact totals are unknown.

Jonathan Greenleaf was subsequently elected by the General Court.

=== Hampshire ===
1788 Hampshire Senate election
Party	Candidate	Votes	%
Federalist	Caleb Strong (incumbent)	1,460	55.07
Unknown	John Hastings (incumbent)	1,441	54.36
Unknown	John Bliss	1,267	47.79
Unknown	David Sexton	1,240	46.77
Unknown	William Rodman	1,082	40.81
Unknown	Oliver Phelps (incumbent)	962	35.29
Total votes		2,651	100.00

Incumbent Senator David Smead was not re-elected, and his exact vote total is unknown.

Many other candidates received votes throughout the county, but their exact totals are unknown:

- Samuel Fowler
- Phinease Stebbins
- Daniel Cooley
- William Lyman
- William Shepard
- Samuel Lyman (Federalist)
- Simeon Strong
- Solomon Stoddard
- Samuel Phelps
- Samuel Field
- Robinson, unnamed
- Benjamin Eli
- Wareham Parks
- Samuel Mather
- Job Wright
- Hugh MacClellan
- Noah Goodman
- Ebenezer Mattoon (Federalist)
- William Pynchon

Bliss and Sexton were subsequently elected by the General Court.

=== Lincoln ===
1788 Lincoln Senate election
Party	Candidate	Votes	%
Unknown	Samuel Thompson (incumbent)	358	37.37
Unknown	Dummer Sewall	245	25.57
Total votes		958	100.00

Waterman Thomas, Daniel Cony, and Henry Dearborn also received votes, but their exact totals are unknown.

Since no candidate received a majority of votes cast, the General Court elected Dummer Sewall to the seat.

=== Middlesex ===
1788 Middlesex Senate election
Party	Candidate	Votes	%
Federalist	Ebenezer Bridge (incumbent)	1,754	66.44
Federalist	Joseph B. Varnum (incumbent)	1,674	63.41
Federalist	Joseph Hosmer (incumbent)	1,628	61.67
Federalist	Isaac Stearns (incumbent)	1,549	58.67
Federalist	Eleazer Brooks	1,441	54.58
Anti-Federalist	Walter MacFarland (incumbent)	–	–
Anti-Federalist	Walter Thompson	–	–
Anti-Federalist	David Brown	–	–
Anti-Federalist	Samuel Reed	–	–
Anti-Federalist	Marshall Spring	–	–
Total votes		2,640	100.00

Exact totals for Anti-Federalist ticket are not listed.

Nathaniel Gorham, William Hunt, John Brooks (Federalist), William Hull, Joseph Curtis, James Winthrop and Elbridge Gerry also received votes, though their exact totals are unknown.

=== Plymouth ===
1788 Plymouth Senate election
Party	Candidate	Votes	%
Unknown	Charles Turner (incumbent)	785	74.13
Unknown	Nathan Cushing (incumbent)	779	73.56
Unknown	Daniel Howard	636	60.06
Total votes		1,059	100.00

Isaac Winslow, Hugh Orr, Joseph Bryant, James Briggs, and Ebenezer White also received votes.

=== Suffolk ===
1788 Suffolk Senate election
Party	Candidate	Votes	%
Anti-Federalist	Samuel Adams (incumbent)	2,332	91.49
Unknown	Stephen Metcalf (incumbent)	2,311	90.66
Federalist	Cotton Tufts (incumbent)	2,268	88.98
Federalist	William Phillips Jr. (incumbent)	2,164	84.90
Unknown	Thomas Dawes	2,071	81.25
Unknown	Elijah Dunbar (incumbent)	1,923	75.44
Unknown	Benjamin Austin Jr. (incumbent)	–	–
Total votes		2,549	100.00

Many other candidates received votes throughout the county, but their exact totals are unknown:

- Benjamin Lincoln (Federalist)
- Richard Cranch
- William Heath
- Samuel Breck
- John Metcalf
- Caleb Davis
- Stephen Higginson (Federalist)
- Jonathan Mason
- Jabez Fisher
- James Warren
- Samuel Niles
- James Sullivan

=== Worcester ===
1788 Worcester Senate election
Party	Candidate	Votes	%
Anti-Federalist	Amos Singletary	1,687	32.77
Unknown	Jonathan Grout (incumbent)	1,651	67.72
Unknown	John Fessenden	1,636	67.72
Unknown	Peter Penneman	1,524	53.25
Unknown	Abel Wilder (incumbent)	1,240	53.25
Unknown	Samuel Baker	1,036	47.30
Unknown	John Taylor	990	28.67
Total votes		3,457	100.00

Many other candidates received votes throughout the county, but their exact totals are unknown:

- Moses Gill
- Timothy Paine
- John Sprague
- Joseph Stone
- Seth Washburn
- Samuel Willard
- Josiah Whitney
- Jonathan Warner
- Timothy Fuller
- Artemas Ward (Federalist)
- Jeremiah Learned
- Samuel Denny
- Martin Kinsley
- Stephen Maynard
- John Tysington
- Timothy Newhall
- Caleb Ammidown
- Bezaleel Taft Sr.
- Samuel Curtis
- Ezra Houghton
- Joseph Allen
- Joseph Behor
- Levi Lincoln Sr.
- Josiah Stearns

=== York ===
1788 York Senate election
Party	Candidate	Votes	%
Unknown	John Frost	209	48.83
Unknown	Nathaniel Wells	176	41.12
Unknown	Edward Cutts (incumbent)	141	32.94
Unknown	Tristram Jordan (incumbent)	118	27.57
Total votes		428	100.00

Nathaniel Low also received votes, but his exact total is unknown.

No candidate received a majority. Edward Cutts and Nathaniel Wells were subsequently elected by the General Court.

== See also ==
- List of former districts of the Massachusetts Senate
