= 1788–89 United States House of Representatives elections =

House elections for the 1st U.S. Congress

- November 24, 1788 – March 5, 1789 (Note: Not including the six seats were added by North Carolina and Rhode Island after the start of this Congress.)

All 59 seats in the United States House of Representatives 30 seats needed for a majority
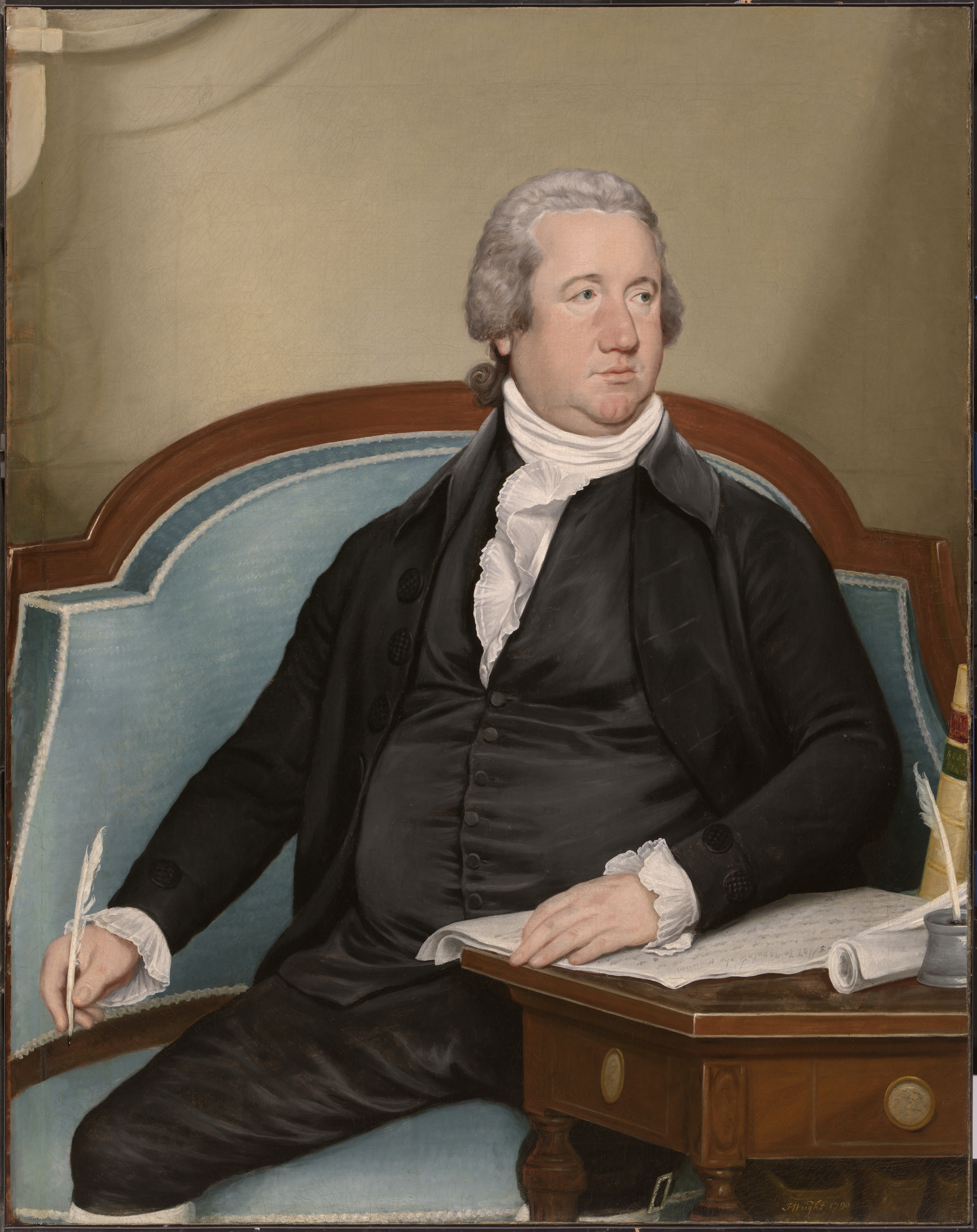

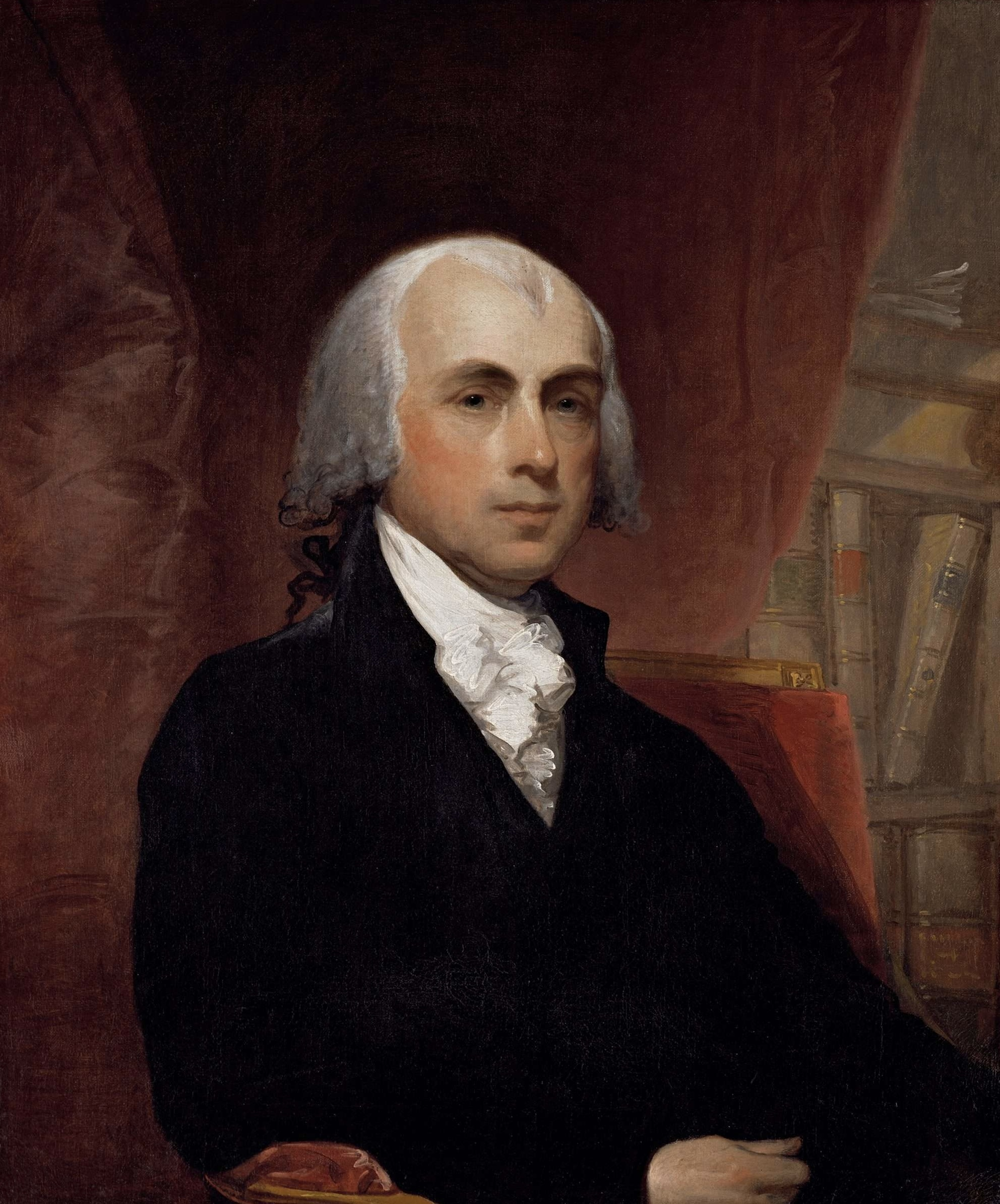
	Majority party	Minority party
Leader	Frederick Muhlenberg	James Madison
Party	Pro-Administration	Anti-Administration
Leader's seat	Pennsylvania at-large	Virginia 5th
Seats won	37 (Note: Includes late elections: North Carolina and Rhode Island ratified the United States Constitution after the 1st Congress had started to meet, and did not hold their elections for U.S. representatives until February and August 1790, respectively.)	28
- Results: Pro-Administration gain Anti-Administration gain Undistricted territory
Elected Speaker
Frederick Muhlenberg
Pro-Administration

The 1788–89 United States House of Representatives elections were the first U.S. House of Representatives elections following the adoption of the Constitution of the United States. Each state set its own date for its congressional elections, ranging from November 24, 1788, to March 5, 1789, before or after the first session of the 1st United States Congress convened on March 4, 1789. They coincided with the election of George Washington as the first president of the United States.

With the new form of government needing to be operational prior to the completion of the first national census, Article I, Section 2, Clause 3 of the U.S. Constitution set a temporary apportionment of seats. Among the original 13 states, 11 of them ratified the Constitution and elected 59 total representatives. North Carolina and Rhode Island did not ratify the Constitution until after the 1st Congress began, and consequently did not elect their representatives until 1790.

Actual political parties did not yet exist, but new members of Congress were informally categorized as either "pro-Administration" (i.e., pro-Washington and pro-Hamilton) or "anti-Administration".

The first session of the first House of Representatives came to order in Federal Hall, New York City on March 4, 1789, with only thirteen members present. The requisite quorum (thirty members out of fifty-nine) was not present until April 1, 1789. The first order of business was the election of a Speaker of the House. On the first ballot, Frederick Muhlenberg was elected Speaker by a majority of votes. The business of the first session was largely devoted to legislative procedure rather than policy.

== Election summaries ==
Article I, Section 2, Clause 3 of the U.S. Constitution set a temporary congressional apportionment until the first national census was completed in 1790.

In the 18th and much of the 19th century, each state set its own date for elections. In many years, elections were even held after the legal start of the Congress, although typically before the start of the first session. In the elections for the 1st Congress, five states held elections in 1788, electing a total of 29 Representatives, and six held elections in 1789, electing a total of 30 Representatives. Two states, North Carolina and Rhode Island, did not ratify the Constitution until November 21, 1789 and May 29, 1790 respectively, well after the Congress had met for the first time, and, consequently, elected representatives late, in 1790, leaving North Carolina unrepresented in the 1st session and Rhode Island in the 1st and 2nd sessions of a total of 3 sessions.

State	Type	Date ↑	Total seats	Anti- Administration	Pro- Administration
General elections
South Carolina	Districts	November 24–25, 1788	5	3	2
Pennsylvania	At-large	November 26, 1788	8	2	6
New Hampshire	At-large	December 15, 1788 (Note: New Hampshire had a majority vote requirement for election. No representatives were elected in the general election and three were returned at a subsequent trial held February 2, 1789.)	3	1	2
Massachusetts	Districts	December 18, 1788 (Note: Massachusetts had a majority vote requirement for election. Four representatives were elected in the general election and four in subsequent trials, a total of 5 trials had to be held between January 29, 1789 and May 11, 1789.)	8	2	6
Connecticut	At-large	December 22, 1788	5	0	5
Delaware	At-large	January 7, 1789	1	0	1
Maryland	At-large / Districts (Note: Maryland had six representatives elected by the whole state electorate, who had to choose one candidate from each district.)	January 7–11, 1789	6	4	2
Virginia	Districts	February 2, 1789	10	7	3
Georgia	At-large / Districts (Note: Georgia had three representatives elected by the whole state electorate, who had to choose one candidate from each district.)	February 9, 1789	3	3	0
New Jersey	At-large	February 11, 1789	4	0	4
New York	Districts	March 3–5, 1789	6	3	3
Late elections
North Carolina	Districts	February 1790	5	3	2
Rhode Island	At-large	August 31, 1790	1	0	1
Total			65	28 43.1%	37 56.9%

House seats
Pro-Admin	56.92%
Anti-Admin	43.08%

Pro-Administration
Anti-Administration

== House composition ==
=== Beginning of the 1st Congress ===
MD‑4	MD‑3	MD‑2	MD‑1	MA‑8	MA‑3	GA‑3	GA‑2	GA‑1	← Anti-Administration										
NH‑AL	NY‑1	NY‑4	NY‑6	PA‑AL	PA‑AL	SC‑2	SC‑4	SC‑5	VA‑2	VA‑3	VA‑5	VA‑6	VA‑7	VA‑8	VA‑9	VA‑10	VA‑4	VA‑1	SC‑3
Majority →																			SC‑1
MA‑5	MA‑6	MA‑7	MD‑5	MD‑6	NH‑AL	NH‑AL	NJ‑AL	NJ‑AL	NJ‑AL	NJ‑AL	NY‑2	NY‑3	NY‑5	PA‑AL	PA‑AL	PA‑AL	PA‑AL	PA‑AL	PA‑AL
MA‑4	MA‑2	MA‑1	DE‑AL	CT‑AL	CT‑AL	CT‑AL	CT‑AL	CT‑AL	← Pro-Administration										

=== End of the 1st Congress (1791) ===
Six seats were filled late because North Carolina and Rhode Island ratified the Constitution late. One pro-Administration representative resigned and the seat remained open at the end of the Congress.

NH‑AL	NC‑3	NC‑2	NC‑1	MD‑4	MD‑3	MD‑2	MD‑1	MA‑8	MA‑3	GA‑3	GA‑2	GA‑1	← Anti-Administration						
NY‑1	NY‑4	NY‑6	PA‑AL	PA‑AL	SC‑2	SC‑4	SC‑5	VA‑2	VA‑3	VA‑5	VA‑6	VA‑7	VA‑8	VA‑9	MA‑5	VA‑10	VA‑4	VA‑1	SC‑3
Majority →																			SC‑1
NC‑4	NC‑5	NY‑4	NY‑5	NH‑AL	NH‑AL	NJ‑AL	NJ‑AL	NJ‑AL	NJ‑AL	NY‑2	NY‑3	NY‑5	PA‑AL	PA‑AL	PA‑AL	PA‑AL	PA‑AL	PA‑AL	RI‑AL
MD‑6	MD‑5	MA‑7	MA‑6	MA‑4	MA‑2	MA‑1	DE‑AL	CT‑AL	CT‑AL	CT‑AL	CT‑AL	CT‑AL	← Pro-Administration						

Key:

A	= Anti-Administration
P	= Pro-Administration
V	= Vacant

== Special election ==
This was the first special election to the United States House of Representatives.

District	Incumbent			This race	
District	Member	Party	First elected	Results	Candidates
New Hampshire at-large	Benjamin West	Pro-Administration	1788/89	Member-elect (see below) chose not to serve. New member elected June 22, 1789. Pro-Administration hold.	▌ ✓ Abiel Foster (Pro-Admin.) 1,804 votes 58.3%; ▌John S. Sherburne (Anti-Admin.) 538 votes 17.4%; ▌James Sheate (Unknown) (Note: Party affiliation not available) 190 votes 6.1%; ▌Elisha Payne (Unknown) 139 votes 4.5%; ▌Joshua Atherton (Unknown) 112 votes 3.6%; ▌Nathaniel Peabody (Unknown) 86 votes 2.9%; ▌Simeon Olcott (Pro-Admin.) 76 votes 2.5%

== Connecticut ==
District	Result	Candidates
Connecticut at-large 5 seats on a general ticket	Pro-Administration win.	▌ ✓ Benjamin Huntington (Note: Source does not give numbers of votes.) (Pro-Admin.); ▌ ✓ Roger Sherman (Pro-Admin.); ▌ ✓ Jonathan Sturges (Pro-Admin.); ▌ ✓ Jonathan Trumbull Jr. (Pro-Admin.); ▌ ✓ Jeremiah Wadsworth (Pro-Admin.); ▌John Chester (Unknown); ▌Jesse Root (Unknown); ▌Jedediah Strong (Unknown); ▌Erastus Wolcott (Unknown); ▌James Hillhouse (Pro-Admin.); ▌John Treadwell (Unknown); ▌Stephen Mix Mitchell (Pro-Admin.)
Connecticut at-large 5 seats on a general ticket	Pro-Administration win.	▌ ✓ Benjamin Huntington (Pro-Admin.); ▌ ✓ Roger Sherman (Pro-Admin.); ▌ ✓ Jonathan Sturges (Pro-Admin.); ▌ ✓ Jonathan Trumbull Jr. (Pro-Admin.); ▌ ✓ Jeremiah Wadsworth (Pro-Admin.); ▌John Chester (Unknown); ▌Jesse Root (Unknown); ▌Jedediah Strong (Unknown); ▌Erastus Wolcott (Unknown); ▌James Hillhouse (Pro-Admin.); ▌John Treadwell (Unknown); ▌Stephen Mix Mitchell (Pro-Admin.)
Connecticut at-large 5 seats on a general ticket	Pro-Administration win.	▌ ✓ Benjamin Huntington (Pro-Admin.); ▌ ✓ Roger Sherman (Pro-Admin.); ▌ ✓ Jonathan Sturges (Pro-Admin.); ▌ ✓ Jonathan Trumbull Jr. (Pro-Admin.); ▌ ✓ Jeremiah Wadsworth (Pro-Admin.); ▌John Chester (Unknown); ▌Jesse Root (Unknown); ▌Jedediah Strong (Unknown); ▌Erastus Wolcott (Unknown); ▌James Hillhouse (Pro-Admin.); ▌John Treadwell (Unknown); ▌Stephen Mix Mitchell (Pro-Admin.)
Connecticut at-large 5 seats on a general ticket	Pro-Administration win.	▌ ✓ Benjamin Huntington (Pro-Admin.); ▌ ✓ Roger Sherman (Pro-Admin.); ▌ ✓ Jonathan Sturges (Pro-Admin.); ▌ ✓ Jonathan Trumbull Jr. (Pro-Admin.); ▌ ✓ Jeremiah Wadsworth (Pro-Admin.); ▌John Chester (Unknown); ▌Jesse Root (Unknown); ▌Jedediah Strong (Unknown); ▌Erastus Wolcott (Unknown); ▌James Hillhouse (Pro-Admin.); ▌John Treadwell (Unknown); ▌Stephen Mix Mitchell (Pro-Admin.)
Connecticut at-large 5 seats on a general ticket	Pro-Administration win.	▌ ✓ Benjamin Huntington (Pro-Admin.); ▌ ✓ Roger Sherman (Pro-Admin.); ▌ ✓ Jonathan Sturges (Pro-Admin.); ▌ ✓ Jonathan Trumbull Jr. (Pro-Admin.); ▌ ✓ Jeremiah Wadsworth (Pro-Admin.); ▌John Chester (Unknown); ▌Jesse Root (Unknown); ▌Jedediah Strong (Unknown); ▌Erastus Wolcott (Unknown); ▌James Hillhouse (Pro-Admin.); ▌John Treadwell (Unknown); ▌Stephen Mix Mitchell (Pro-Admin.)

== Delaware ==
Delaware had a single representative. The election was held January 7, 1789. Under the law at the time, each voter cast two votes for representative, at least one of whom had to be from a different county.

District	Result	Candidates
Delaware at-large	Pro-Administration win.	▌ ✓ John Vining (Pro-Admin.) 898 votes (43.6%); ▌Rhoads Shankland (Anti-Admin.) 491 votes (23.9%); ▌Gunning Bedford Jr. (Unknown) 308 votes (15.0%); ▌Joshua Clayton (Pro-Admin.) 272 votes (13.2%); ▌Allen MacLean (Unknown) 90 votes (4.4%)

== Georgia ==
Georgia had a mixed at-large/district system for the 1st Congress. Representatives were elected at-large, but for three district-based seats.

District	Result	Candidates
Georgia 1 "Lower district"	Anti-Administration win.	▌ ✓ James Jackson (Anti-Admin.) 50.89% (604 votes); ▌William Houstoun (Unknown) 33.61% (399 votes); ▌Henry Osborne (Unknown) 14.49% (172 votes); Others: ▌James Seagrove (Unknown) 0.59% (7 votes); Others 0.42% (5 votes)
Georgia 2 "Middle district"	Anti-Administration win.	▌ ✓ Abraham Baldwin (Anti-Admin.) 69.19% (1,096 votes); ▌Henry Osborne (Unknown) 15.21% (241 votes); ▌Joseph Sumner (Unknown) 10.42% (165 votes); ▌Isaac Briggs (Unknown) 2.65% (42 votes); Others: ▌William Houstoun (Unknown) 1.45% (23 votes); ▌James Jackson (Unknown) 0.57% (9 votes); Others 0.51% (8 votes)
Georgia 3 "Upper district"	Anti-Administration win.	▌ ✓ George Mathews (Anti-Admin.) 96.26% (1,158 votes); ▌Henry Osborne (Unknown) 2.00% (24 votes); Others: ▌Anthony Wayne (Unknown) 0.67% (8 votes); ▌Joseph Sumner (Unknown) 0.42% (5 votes); Others 0.67% (8 votes)

== Maryland ==
Maryland had a mixed district/at-large system similar to Georgia's. Under Maryland law, "candidates were elected at-large but had to be residents of a specific district with the statewide vote determining winners from each district."

District	Result	Candidates
Maryland 1	Anti-Administration win.	▌ ✓ Michael J. Stone (Anti-Admin.) 65.36% (5,154 votes); ▌George Dent (Pro-Admin.) 34.64% (2,731 votes)
Maryland 2	Anti-Administration win.	▌ ✓ Joshua Seney (Anti-Admin.) 100% (7,616 votes)
Maryland 3	Anti-Administration win.	▌ ✓ Benjamin Contee (Anti-Admin.) 70.07% (5,476 votes); ▌John F. Mercer (Anti-Admin.) 29.93% (2,339 votes)
Maryland 4	Anti-Administration win.	▌ ✓ William Smith (Anti-Admin.) 69.08% (5,415 votes); ▌Samuel Sterett (Anti-Admin.) 30.92% (2,424 votes)
Maryland 5	Pro-Administration win.	▌ ✓ George Gale (Pro-Admin.) 70.74% (5,456 votes); ▌John Done (Anti-Admin.) 23.75% (1,832 votes); ▌William V. Murray (Pro-Admin.) 5.51% (425 votes)
Maryland 6	Pro-Administration win.	▌ ✓ Daniel Carroll (Pro-Admin.) 74.77% (5,819 votes); ▌Abraham Faw (Anti-Admin.) 25.23% (1,964 votes)

== Massachusetts ==
Massachusetts House Elections, December 18, 1788 – May 11, 1789
Party	Candidate	Votes	%
Pro-Administration	6 elected	6,232	54.4
Anti-Administration	2 elected	5,228	45.6

Massachusetts required a majority vote, necessitating additional votes if no one won a majority. This was necessary in 4 of the districts.

In the fourth district,

The first election in the district was in part a reflection of the rivalry between Hampshire and Berkshire counties. Berkshire was the less populous county, but four of the six candidates who received the most votes - Theodore Sedgwick, William Whiting, Thompson J. Skinner, and William Williams - were residents of the county. The two Hampshire candidates were Samuel Lyman and John Worthington. The first election did not reflect the fact that the two counties were centers of agrarian discontent and of support for Shays's Rebellion. Nor did it reflect the fact that in the state Convention the Hampshire delegates voted 32 to 19 and the Berkshire delegates voted 16 to 6 against ratification of the Constitution. Only Whiting was regarded as a Shaysite and an Anti-Federalist, while the other five men were Federalists - and two of these - Worthington and Williams - had been virtual if not actual Loyalists during the Revolution. The issue of amendments to the Constitution was not raised during the first election in the district, but it became so important in the ensuing elections that Theodore Sedgwick, who opposed amendments, publicly promised to support them before the fifth election, which he won.

— The Documentary History of the First Federal Elections: 1788-1790. Vol. I. p. 603.

In the fifth district,

The only problem was whether Partridge could retain his post of sheriff of Plymouth County and accept a seat in Congress, as he had done in 1779-1782 and 1783-1785. He received a certificate from Governor Hancock on 10 January notifying him of his election. Partridge wrote three letters to the Governor. In the first, which he apparently did not send, he refused the appointment. He accepted in the two following letters but explained that he would not take the seat if he had to give up his post as sheriff (12, 20 January, 23 February). The issue of whether or not a state officeholder could retain a state post and still serve in Congress had been and would be raised in other states. On 12 February Governor Hancock asked his Council for advice about Partridge and about George Leonard, judge of probate in Bristol County, who had been elected to Congress from the Bristol-Dukes-Nantucket District. The Council replied in writing the same day that it was 'inexpedient' for a man to hold the office of judge of probate and a seat in Congress, but that it did not find anything in the state constitution which prevented a sheriff from also being a member of Congress. The Council advised, however, that it would be inexpedient to introduce the practice of sheriffs being absent for long periods although Partridge 'may at present be indulged' and take a seat in Congress 'consistently with the safety of that county' (Council Proceedings, Thursday 12 February, M-Ar). The next day Governor Hancock sent the Council's written reply to the legislature and asked for its advice (13 February, Miscellaneous Legislative Documents, House Files, M-Ar). The two houses appointed a joint committee which wrote a report that was approved and sent to the Governor on Monday, 16 February. The legislature declared that if George Leonard continued to hold the office of judge of probate and also took a seat on Congress, any future legislature would address the Governor authorizing him and the Council to appoint another person judge of probate in Bristol County. But the legislature refused to give advice about George Partridge. It pointed out that sheriffs served during the pleasure of the governor, and (with the advice of his Council) were removable by him at any time. Sheriffs were not removable in any other way except through impeachment by the House and a trial before and conviction by the Senate. Therefore the House and Senate declared that intervention by the legislature was 'neither necessary or proper; and from the conduct and advice of your Council, they see no reason to doubt the wisdom of that constitutional provision' (House and Senate Proceedings, 13, 14, 16 February).

— The Documentary History of the First Federal Elections: 1788-1790. Vol. I. pp. 575–76.

In the eighth district,

It was evident before the elections were completed in Worcester District that a candidate who did not support amendments to the Constitution had no chance of winning. The three leading candidates in the three Worcester District elections were Jonathan Grout, Timothy Paine, and Artemas Ward. Grout, a local leader during the Revolution, had voted against ratification of the Constitution and in 1788 was a member of the legislature. Paine, a prominent officeholder in the county for two decades before the Revolution, had been appointed to the Royal Council in 1774. Unlike most 'mandamus councillors,' he did not become a Loyalist. By 1788 he had regained much of his influence in the town of Worcester. Ward had been appointed commanding general of Massachusetts troops after Lexington and Concord, he remained in charge until George Washington was appointed commander-in-chief of the Continental Army in July 1775. The popular Ward resigned his commission in April 1776 and returned to state politics. The past records of these three men did not become a public issue until shortly before the third and final election.
...
AS in the two previous election, the two Worcester newspapers, with one exception, printed nothing until their last issues before the election on 2 March. The exception consisted of two items (one of which supported Timothy Paine) in the Massachusetts Spy on 19 February. Then on 26 February the Massachusetts Spy published five articles. Two of them supported Jonathan Grout, one supported Artemas Ward, one backed Timothy Paine, and the fifth did not mention any names. On the same day the American Herald published four items. One supported Grout, one opposed Paine because he had been a mandamus councillor, and the other two items urged that he be elected. The issue of Paine's appointment as a mandamus councillor by the British government in 1774 had been brought up for the first time by the Boston Independent Chronicle, 12 February, and not by the Worcester newspapers. Despite the ambivalence of the newspapers, there was a considerable increase of interest, for the vote almost doubled over the first election on 18 December 1788: from 1,886 to 3,484. Grout was elected Representative by a decisive majority. Artemas Ward, who ran a poor third in each of the three elections, finally defeated Grout in the election to the second Congress in 1791. Paine was elected to the state House of Representatives in 1789.

— The Documentary History of the First Federal Elections: 1788-1790. Vol. I. pp. 601, 676.

District	Result	Candidates (Note: Only candidates with at least 1% of the vote listed.)
Massachusetts 1	Pro-Administration win.	▌ ✓ Fisher Ames (Pro-Admin.) 818 votes (50.7%); ▌Samuel Adams (Anti-Admin.) 521 votes (32.3%); ▌Samuel A. Otis (Unknown) 70 votes (4.3%); ▌Charles Jarvis (Unknown) 45 votes (2.8%); ▌Benjamin Austin (Unknown) 43 votes (2.7%); ▌John Adams (Pro-Admin.) 30 votes (1.9%); Others 86 votes (5.3%)
Massachusetts 2	Pro-Administration win.	First ballot (December 18, 1788): ▌Benjamin Goodhue (Pro-Admin.) 567 votes (38.6%); ▌Jonathan Jackson (Pro-Admin.) 392 votes (26.6%); ▌Nathan Daneseg 295 votes (20.1%); ▌Samuel Holten 202 votes (13.8%); Scattering 13 votes; Second ballot (January 29, 1789): ▌ ✓ Benjamin Goodhue (Pro-Admin.) 1,491 votes (67.0%); ▌Jonathan Jackson (Pro-Admin.) 724 votes (33.0%); Scattering 7 votes
Massachusetts 3	Anti-Administration win.	First ballot (December 18, 1788): ▌Nathaniel Gorham (Unknown) 536 votes (36.4%); ▌Elbridge Gerry (Anti-Admin.) 384 votes (26.1%); ▌Joseph Bradley Varnum (Anti-Admin.) 254 votes (17.2%); ▌John Brooks (Pro-Admin.) 106 votes (7.2%); ▌James Winthrop (Unknown) 50 votes (3.4%); ▌Loammi Baldwin (Unknown) 43 votes (2.9%); Scattering 100 votes (4.4%); Second ballot (January 29, 1789): ▌ ✓ Elbridge Gerry (Anti-Admin.) 1,140 votes (61.1%); ▌Joseph Bradley Varnum (Anti-Admin.) 366 votes (19.6%); ▌William Hulberg (Pro-Admin.) 205 votes (11.0%); ▌James Winthrop (Anti-Admin.) 82 votes (4.4%); ▌Ebenezer Bridge (Unknown) 52 votes (2.8%); Others 22 votes (1.2%)
Massachusetts 4	Pro-Administration win.	First ballot (December 18, 1788): ▌Theodore Sedgwick (Pro-Admin.) 835 votes (35.6%); ▌Samuel Lyman (Pro-Admin.) 330 votes (14.7%); ▌William Whiting (Unknown) 302 votes (13.4%); ▌Thomson J. Skinner (Anti-Admin.) 256 votes (10.4%); ▌William Williams (Unknown) 181 votes (8.7%); ▌John Worthington (Unknown) 178 votes (7.3%); ▌John Bacon (Unknown) 93 votes (4.1%); Second ballot (January 29, 1789): ▌Theodore Sedgwick (Pro-Admin.) 736 votes (31.7%); ▌Samuel Lyman (Pro-Admin.) 718 votes (31.0%); ▌William Whiting (Unknown) 578 votes (24.9%); ▌Thomson J. Skinner (Anti-Admin.) 248 votes (10.7%); ▌John Bacon (Anti-Admin.) 39 votes (1.7%); Third ballot (March 2, 1789): ▌Samuel Lyman (Pro-Admin.) 1,847 votes (32.9%); ▌Theodore Sedgwick (Pro-Admin.) 1,523 votes (30.6%); ▌William Whiting (Unknown) 1,109 votes (22.9%); ▌Thomson J. Skinner (Anti-Admin.) 648 votes (12.8%); Fourth ballot (March 30, 1789): ▌Theodore Sedgwick (Pro-Admin.) 1,649 votes (47.0%); ▌Samuel Lyman (Pro-Admin.) 1,382 votes (39.3%); ▌William Whiting (Unknown) 468 votes (11.7%); Scattering: 64 votes; Fifth ballot (May 11, 1789): ▌ ✓ Theodore Sedgwick (Pro-Admin.) 2,155 votes (50.2%); ▌Samuel Lyman (Pro-Admin.) 2,138 votes (47.8%); ▌John Bacon (Unknown) 67 votes (1.3%); Scattering: 27 votes
Massachusetts 5	Pro-Administration win.	▌ ✓ George Partridge (Pro-Admin.) 501 votes (90.4%); Others 53 votes (9.6%)
Massachusetts 6	Pro-Administration win.	▌ ✓ George Thatcher (Pro-Admin.) 588 votes (62.1%); ▌Josiah Thacker (Unknown) 182 votes (19.2%); ▌Nathan Willing (Unknown) 73 votes (7.7%); Scattering 105 votes
Massachusetts 7	Pro-Administration win.	▌ ✓ George Leonard (Pro-Admin.) 710 votes (54.0%); ▌Phanuel Bishop (Anti-Admin.) 342 votes (26.0%); ▌David Cobb (Pro-Admin.) 241 votes (18.3%); Scattering 23 votes
Massachusetts 8	Anti-Administration win.	First ballot (December 18, 1788): ▌Jonathan Grout (Anti-Admin.) 665 votes (35.3%); ▌Timothy Paine (Unknown) 561 votes (29.8%); ▌Artemas Ward (Pro-Admin.) 284 votes (15.1%); ▌Moses Gill (Unknown) 110 votes (5.8%); ▌Abiel Wilder (Unknown) 71 votes (3.8%); ▌John Sprague (Unknown) 63 votes (3.3%); Others 132 votes (4.9%); Second ballot (January 29, 1789): ▌Timothy Paine (Pro-Admin.) 1,040 votes (45.4%); ▌Jonathan Grout (Unknown) 990 votes (42.1%); ▌Artemas Ward (Pro-Admin.) 258 votes (11.3%); Others 27 votes (1.2%); Third ballot (March 2, 1789): ▌ ✓ Jonathan Grout (Anti-Admin.) 1,968 votes (55.7%); ▌Timothy Paine (Unknown) 1,312 votes (37.1%); ▌Artemas Ward (Pro-Admin.) 256 votes (7.2%); Scattering 18 votes

== New Hampshire ==
New Hampshire law required a winning candidate to receive votes from a majority of voters (16.7% of votes). No candidate won such a majority on the first ballot, so a second ballot was held February 2, 1789.

District	Result	Candidates
New Hampshire at-large 3 seats on a general ticket	Pro-Administration win. West winner chose not to serve before the start of the Congress. A special election was held June 22, 1789; see above.	First ballot (December 15, 1788): ▌Benjamin West (Pro-Admin.) 15.4%; ▌Samuel Livermore (Anti-Admin.) 14.6%; ▌Paine Wingate (Pro-Admin.) 13.4%; ▌Abiel Foster (Pro-Admin.) 8.0%; ▌John Sullivan (Pro-Admin.) 7.1%; ▌Nicholas Gilman (Pro-Admin.) 5.6%; ▌Joshua Atherton (Unknown) 5.2%; ▌Nathaniel Peabody (Unknown) 5.1%; ▌Peirse Long (Unknown) 4.4%; ▌Benjamin Bellows (Unknown) 3.4%; Others 17.9%; Second ballot (February 2, 1789): ▌ ✓ Benjamin West (Pro-Admin.) 33.0%; ▌ ✓ Samuel Livermore (Anti-Admin.) 26.2%; ▌ ✓ Nicholas Gilman (Pro-Admin.) 19.5%; ▌Abiel Foster (Pro-Admin.) 19.5%; ▌John Sullivan (Pro-Admin.) 1.9%
New Hampshire at-large 3 seats on a general ticket	Anti-Administration win.	
New Hampshire at-large 3 seats on a general ticket	Pro-Administration win.	

== New Jersey ==
District	Result	Candidates
New Jersey at-large 4 seats on a general ticket	Pro-Administration win.	▌ ✓ James Schureman (Pro-Admin.) 19.93% (13,871 votes); ▌ ✓ Elias Boudinot (Pro-Admin.) 13.00% (9,051 votes); ▌ ✓ Lambert Cadwalader (Pro-Admin.) 12.50% (8,702 votes); ▌ ✓ Thomas Sinnickson (Pro-Admin.) 12.02% (8,364 votes); ▌Abraham Clark (Pro-Admin.) 10.47% (7,287 votes); ▌Jonathan Dayton (Pro-Admin.) 9.86% (6,859 votes); ▌Robert Hoops (Unknown) 3.68% (2,562 votes); ▌Whitten Cripps (Unknown) 3.41% (2,375 votes); ▌Benjamin Van Cleve (Unknown) 2.85% (1,983 votes); ▌James Parker (Anti-Admin.) 2.48% (1,724 votes); ▌John Witherspoon (Unknown) 2.46% (1,711 votes); ▌Thomas Henderson (Pro-Admin.) 1.66% (1,156 votes); ▌Robert L. Hooper (Unknown) 1.39% (964 votes); ▌Josiah Hornblower (Unknown) 1.02% (708 votes); Others 3.28% (2,281 votes): ▌ James Linn (Unknown) 0.740% (515 votes); ▌ Aaron Kitchell (Unknown) 0.569% (396 votes); ▌ John Stevens, Jr. (Unknown) 0.371% (258 votes); ▌ William Winds (Unknown) 0.330% (230 votes); ▌ John Stevens (Unknown) 0.264% (184 votes); ▌ John Fell (Unknown) 0.197% (137 votes); ▌ Silas Condit (Unknown) 0.154% (107 votes); ▌ Henry Stites (Unknown) 0.099% (69 votes); ▌ Robert Ogden (Unknown) 0.093% (65 votes); ▌ Charles Stewart (Unknown) 0.092% (64 votes) ▌ Alex MacWhorter (Unknown) 0.075% (52 votes) ▌ Benjamin Thompson (Unknown) 0.060% (42 votes) ▌ Abraham Kitchell (Unknown) 0.046% (32 votes) ▌ Kitchell (Note: Unclear whether these votes were for Aaron Kitchell or Abraham Kitchell.) (Unknown) 0.033% (23 votes) ▌ Joseph Sheppard (Unknown) 0.029% (20 votes) ▌ John Rutherford [sic] (Unknown) 0.026% (18 votes) ▌ William Woodhull (Unknown) 0.022% (15 votes) ▌ Abraham Ogden (Unknown) 0.020% (14 votes) ▌ Frederick Frelinghuysen (Pro-Administration) 0.013% (9 votes) ▌ Samuel Tuthill (Unknown) 0.013% (9 votes) ▌ Jacob Hardenburgh [sic] (Unknown) 0.010% (7 votes) ▌ Thomas Fenimore (Unknown) 0.009% (6 votes) ▌ Hugh Hughes (Unknown) 0.004% (3 votes) ▌ John Armstrong (Unknown) 0.001% (1 vote) ▌ Patrick Dennis (Unknown) 0.001% (1 vote) ▌ John Mehelm (Unknown) 0.001% (1 vote) ▌ John Neilson (Pro-Administration) 0.001% (1 vote) ▌ Samuel Smith (Pro-Administration) 0.001% (1 vote) ▌ Mark Thompson [sic] (Unknown) 0.001% (1 vote)
New Jersey at-large 4 seats on a general ticket	Pro-Administration win.	
New Jersey at-large 4 seats on a general ticket	Pro-Administration win.	
New Jersey at-large 4 seats on a general ticket	Pro-Administration win.	

The election of all four representatives was contested, but the records that explained the precise grounds on which the election was contested have been lost due to the burning of Washington in the War of 1812. It is known to have related to questions of regularity and procedure. All four representatives' elections were ruled valid.

== New York ==
New York held elections to the 1st Congress on March 3 and 4, 1789. At the time, districts were unnumbered. They are retroactively numbered in this section.

District	Result	Candidates
New York 1	Anti-Administration win.	▌ ✓ William Floyd (Anti-Admin.) 100% (894 votes)
New York 2	Pro-Administration win.	▌ ✓ John Laurance (Pro-Administration) 86.26% (2,542 votes); ▌John Broome (Anti-Administration) 12.62% (372 votes); ▌Philip Pell (Anti-Admin.) 1.12% (33 votes)
New York 3	Pro-Administration win.	▌ ✓ Egbert Benson (Pro-Admin.) 50.43% (584 votes); ▌Theodorus Bailey (Anti-Admin.) 49.57% (574 votes)
New York 4	Anti-Administration win.	▌ ✓ John Hathorn (Anti-Admin.) 100%
New York 5	Pro-Administration win.	▌ ✓ Peter Silvester (Pro-Admin.) 51.21% (1,628 votes); ▌Matthew Adgate (Anti-Admin.) 47.22% (1,501 votes); ▌John Williams (Unknown) 1.57% (50 votes)
New York 6	Anti-Administration win.	▌ ✓ Jeremiah Van Rensselaer (Anti-Admin.) 54.51% (1,456 votes); ▌Abraham Ten Broeck (Pro-Admin.) 45.49% (1,215 votes)

== North Carolina ==
North Carolina ratified the Constitution late and thus elected representatives to the 1st Congress in 1790.

== Pennsylvania ==
Pennsylvania held elections to the 1st Congress on November 26, 1788. For this first election (and again in 1792 election for the 3rd Congress), Pennsylvania chose to elect all of its representatives on a single statewide general ticket, an attempt by the pro-Administration-majority legislature to prevent anti-Administration candidates from winning seats.

District	Result	Candidates
Pennsylvania at-large 8 seats on a general ticket	Pro-Administration win.	▌ ✓ Frederick Muhlenberg (Pro-Admin.) 7.49% (8,726 votes); ▌ ✓ Henry Wynkoop (Pro-Admin.) 7.09% (8,280 votes); ▌ ✓ Thomas Hartley (Pro-Admin.) 7.02% (8,191 votes); ▌ ✓ George Clymer (Pro-Admin.) 6.94% (8,116 votes); ▌ ✓ Thomas Fitzsimons (Pro-Admin.) 6.94% (8,116 votes); ▌ ✓ Thomas Scott (Pro-Admin.) 6.92% (8,096 votes); ▌ ✓ Peter Muhlenberg (Anti-Admin.) 6.38% (7,465 votes); ▌ ✓ Daniel Hiester (Anti-Admin.) 6.37% (7,455 votes); ▌John Allison (Pro-Admin.) 6.08% (7,098 votes); ▌Stephen Chambers (Pro-Admin.) 6.06% (7,080 votes); ▌William Findley (Anti-Admin.) 5.66% (6,638 votes); ▌William Irvine (Anti-Admin.) 5.58% (6,546 votes); ▌Charles Pettit (Anti-Admin.) 5.57% (6,537 votes); ▌William Montgomery (Anti-Admin.) 5.46% (6,409 votes); ▌Blair McClenachan (Anti-Admin.) 5.35% (6,277 votes); ▌Robert Whitehall [sic] (Anti-Admin.) 5.03% (5,908 votes)
Pennsylvania at-large 8 seats on a general ticket	Pro-Administration win.	
Pennsylvania at-large 8 seats on a general ticket	Pro-Administration win.	
Pennsylvania at-large 8 seats on a general ticket	Pro-Administration win.	
Pennsylvania at-large 8 seats on a general ticket	Pro-Administration win.	
Pennsylvania at-large 8 seats on a general ticket	Pro-Administration win.	
Pennsylvania at-large 8 seats on a general ticket	Anti-Administration win.	
Pennsylvania at-large 8 seats on a general ticket	Anti-Administration win.	

== Rhode Island ==
Rhode Island ratified the Constitution late and thus elected representatives to the 1st Congress in 1790.

== South Carolina ==
District	Result	Candidates
South Carolina 1 "Charleston Division"	Pro-Administration win.	▌ ✓ William L. Smith (Pro-Admin.) 50.98% (600 votes); ▌Alexander Gillon (Anti-Admin.) 32.80% (386 votes); ▌David Ramsay (Pro-Admin.) 16.23% (191 votes)
South Carolina 2 "Beaufort Division"	Anti-Administration win.	▌ ✓ Aedanus Burke (Anti-Admin.) 99.3%
South Carolina 3 "Georgetown Division"	Pro-Administration win.	▌ ✓ Daniel Huger (Pro-Admin.) 75.0%; ▌John Page (Unknown) 25.0%
South Carolina 4 "Camden Division"	Anti-Administration win.	▌ ✓ Thomas Sumter (Anti-Admin.) 100.0%
South Carolina 5 "Ninety-Six Division"	Anti-Administration win.	▌ ✓ Thomas Tudor Tucker (Anti-Admin.) 100%

In the 1st district, William L. Smith (Pro-Administration)'s election was contested by David Ramsay (Pro-Administration) who claimed that Smith had not been a citizen for the required 7 years at the time of his election, the House Committee on Elections ruled in Smith's favor

== Virginia ==
District	Result	Candidates
Virginia 1	Pro-Administration win.	▌ ✓ Alexander White (Pro-Admin.) 100%
Virginia 2	Anti-Administration win.	▌ ✓ John Brown (Anti-Admin.) 100%
Virginia 3	Anti-Administration win.	▌ ✓ Andrew Moore (Anti-Admin.); ▌George Hancock (Pro-Admin.)
Virginia 4	Pro-Administration win.	▌ ✓ Richard Bland Lee (Pro-Admin.) 68.5%; ▌John Pope (Unknown) 31.5%
Virginia 5	Anti-Administration win.	▌ ✓ James Madison (Anti-Admin.) 57.37% (1,308 votes); ▌James Monroe (Anti-Admin.) 42.63% (972 votes)
Virginia 6	Anti-Administration win.	▌ ✓ Isaac Coles (Anti-Admin.)
Virginia 7	Anti-Administration win.	▌ ✓ John Page (Anti-Admin.); ▌Spencer Roane (Unknown); ▌Meriwether Smith (Unknown); ▌Arthur Lee (Unknown); ▌Francis Corbin (Unknown)
Virginia 8	Anti-Administration win.	▌ ✓ Josiah Parker (Anti-Admin.) 48.03% (976 votes); ▌Thomas Mathews (Pro-Admin.) 39.62% (805 votes); ▌Issac Avery (Pro-Admin.) 12.11% (246 votes); Others 0.25% (5 votes): ▌ Frederick Boush (Unknown) 0.05% (1 votes); ▌ Henry Lee (Unknown) 0.05% (1 votes); ▌ Thomas Lawson (Unknown) 0.05% (1 votes); ▌ Thomas Newton (Unknown) 0.05% (1 votes); ▌ Matthew Godfrey (Unknown) 0.05% (1 votes)
Virginia 9	Anti-Administration win.	▌ ✓ Theodorick Bland (Anti-Admin.) 91.2%; ▌Edward Carrington (Unknown) 7.2%; Others: ▌Thomas Rivers (Unknown) 1.5%; ▌Sterling Edmunds (Unknown); ▌Thomas Stith (Unknown); ▌Charles B. Jones (Unknown); ▌Creed Taylor (Unknown); ▌William Ronald (Unknown); ▌William Macon (Unknown)
Virginia 10	Pro-Administration win.	▌ ✓ Samuel Griffin (Pro-Admin.); ▌Benjamin Harrison (Unknown); ▌Miles Selden Jr. (Unknown)

== See also ==
- 1788–89 United States elections
  - List of United States House of Representatives elections (1789–1822)
  - 1788–89 United States Senate elections
  - 1788–89 United States presidential election
- 1st United States Congress

== Bibliography ==
- "A New Nation Votes: American Election Returns 1787-1825". Tufts Digital Library, Tufts University. Archived from the original on January 29, 2015.
- Dubin, Michael J. (March 1, 1998). United States Congressional Elections, 1788-1997: The Official Results of the Elections of the 1st Through 105th Congresses. McFarland and Company. ISBN 978-0786402830.
- Martis, Kenneth C. (January 1, 1989). The Historical Atlas of Political Parties in the United States Congress, 1789-1989. Macmillan Publishing Company. ISBN 978-0029201701.
- "Party Divisions of the House of Representatives* 1789–Present". Office of the Historian, United States House of Representatives.
- Mapping Early American Elections project team (2019). "Mapping Early American Elections". Roy Rosenzweig Center for History and New Media, George Mason University.
