= 1st United States Congress =

1789–91 meeting of the U.S. Congress

| ← | Congress of the Confederation | 2nd | → |
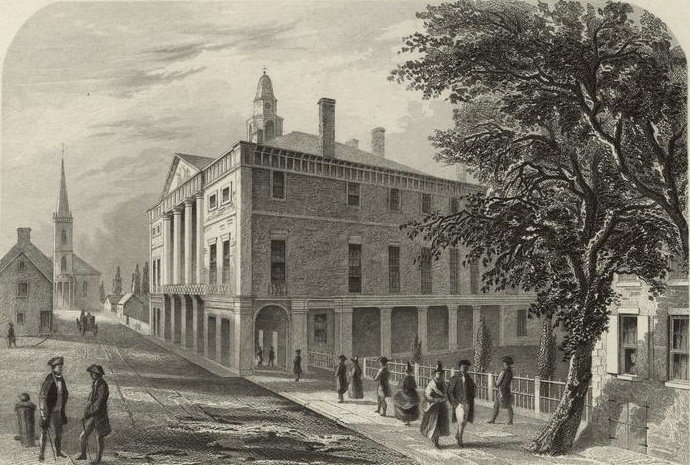
- Federal Hall (1789)

Overview
- Legislative body: United States Congress
- Jurisdiction: United States
- Term: March 4, 1789 – March 3, 1791

Senate
- Members: 22–26
- President: John Adams (P)
- President pro tempore: John Langdon (P)
- Party control: Pro-Administration

House of Representatives
- Members: 59–65
- Speaker: Frederick Muhlenberg (P)
- Party control: Pro-Administration

Sessions
- 1st: March 4, 1789 – September 29, 1789
- 2nd: January 4, 1790 – August 12, 1790
- 3rd: December 6, 1790 – March 3, 1791

The 1st United States Congress, comprising the United States Senate and the United States House of Representatives, met from March 4, 1789, to March 3, 1791, during the first two years of George Washington's presidency, first at Federal Hall in New York City and later at Congress Hall in Philadelphia. With the initial meeting of the First Congress, the United States federal government officially began operations under the new (and current) frame of government established by the 1787 Constitution. The apportionment of seats in the House of Representatives was based on the provisions of Article I, Section 2, Clause 3, of the Constitution. Both chambers had a Pro-Administration majority. Twelve articles of amendment to the Constitution were passed by this Congress and sent to the states for ratification; the ten ratified as additions to the Constitution on December 15, 1791, are collectively known as the Bill of Rights, with an additional amendment ratified more than two centuries later to become the Twenty-seventh Amendment to the United States Constitution.

== Major events ==
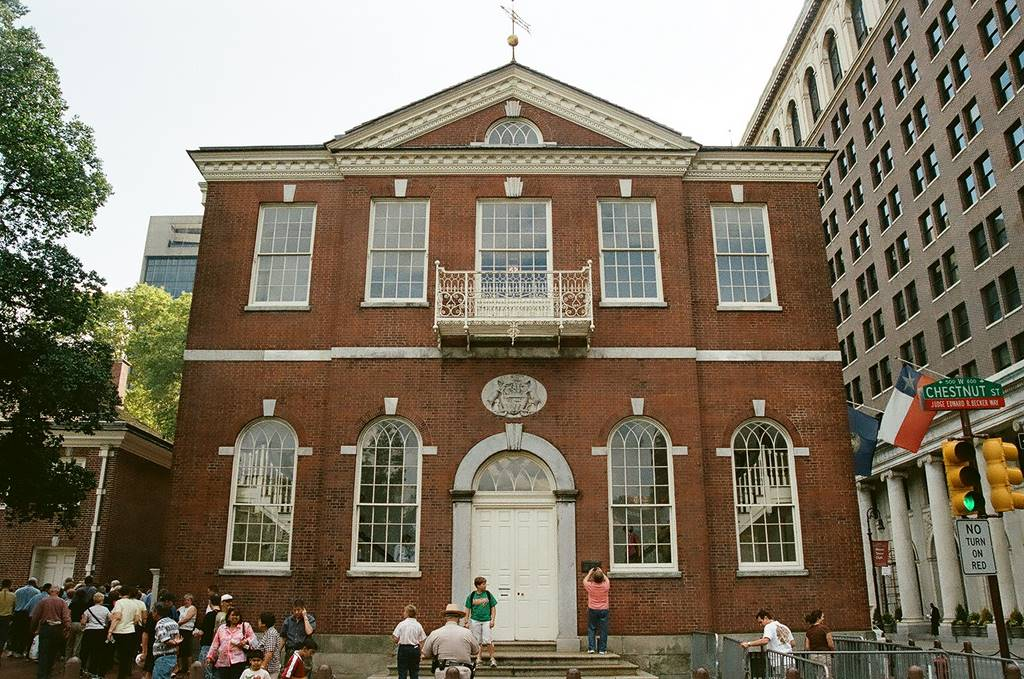
Congress Hall in Philadelphia, meeting place of this Congress's third session.

- April 1, 1789: House of Representatives first achieved a quorum and elected its officers.
- April 6, 1789: Senate first achieved a quorum and elected its officers.
- April 6, 1789: The House and Senate, meeting in joint session, counted the Electoral College ballots, then certified that George Washington was unanimously elected President of the United States and John Adams (having received 34 of 69 votes) was elected as Vice President.
- April 21, 1789: John Adams was inaugurated as the nation's first vice president.
- April 30, 1789: George Washington was inaugurated as the nation's first president at Federal Hall in New York City.
- June 1789: Decision of 1789: Power to remove executive officers vested in the position of the President of the United States.
- January 8, 1790: President Washington gave the first State of the Union Address
- c. June 20, 1790: Compromise of 1790: James Madison agreed to not be "strenuous" in opposition to the assumption of state debts by the federal government; Alexander Hamilton agreed to support a national capital site in the South.

== Major legislation ==
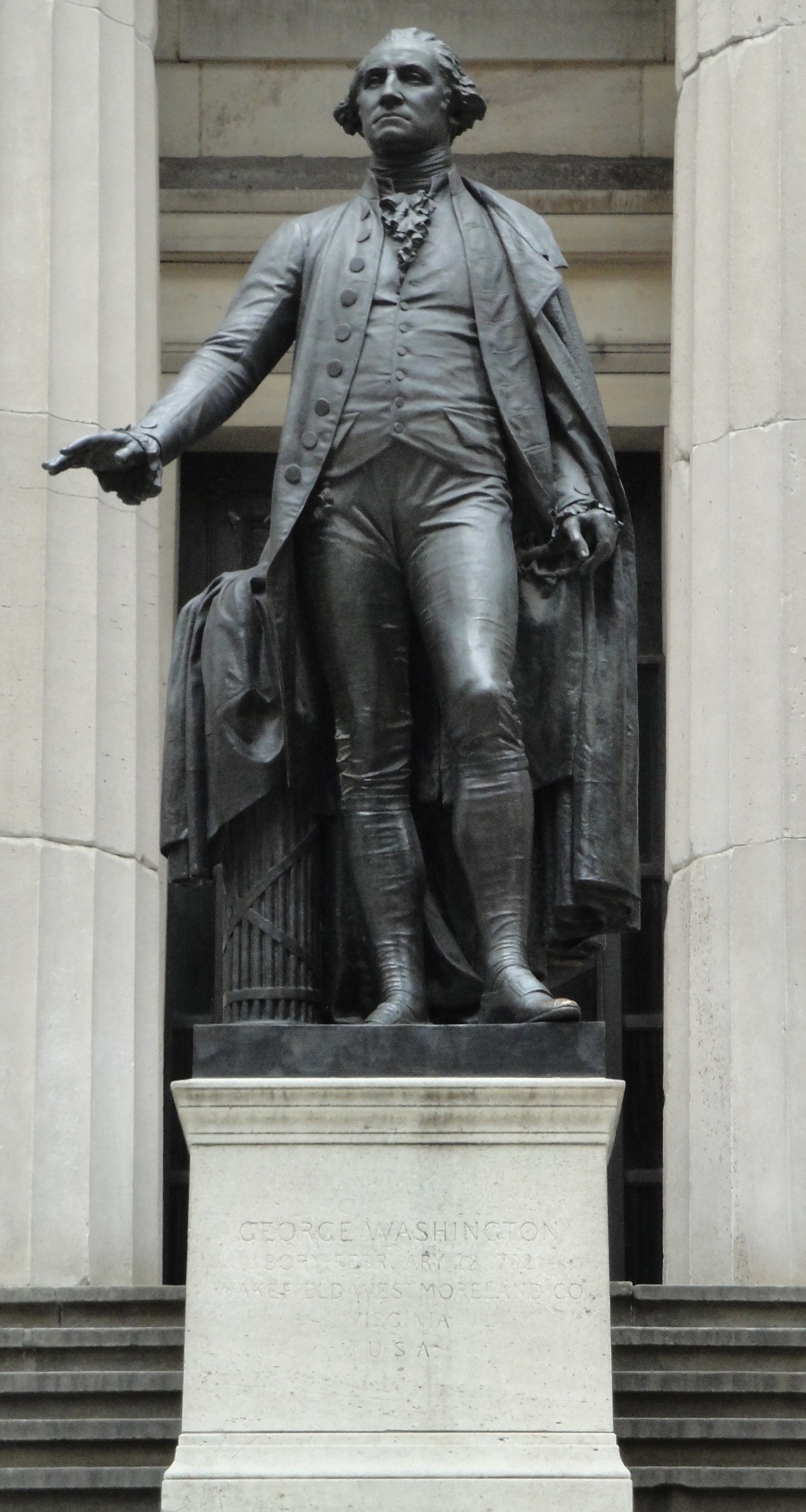
Statue of George Washington in front of Federal Hall, where he was first inaugurated as president.

=== Session 1 ===
Held March 4, 1789, through September 29, 1789, at Federal Hall in New York City

- June 1, 1789: An Act to regulate the Time and Manner of administering certain Oaths, ch. 1, 1 Stat. 23
- July 4, 1789: Tariff of 1789, ch. 2, 1 Stat. 24
- July 27, 1789: United States Department of State was established, originally named the Department of Foreign Affairs, ch. 4, 1 Stat. 28.
- July 31, 1789: Regulation of the Collection of Duties on Tonnage and Merchandise, ch.5, 1 Stat. 29, which established the United States Customs Service and its ports of entry.
- August 7, 1789: Department of War was established, ch. 7, 1 Stat. 49.
- September 2, 1789: United States Department of the Treasury was established, ch. 12, 1 Stat. 65
- September 24, 1789: Judiciary Act of 1789, ch. 20, 1 Stat. 73, which established the federal judiciary and the office of Attorney General

=== Session 2 ===
Held January 4, 1790, through August 12, 1790, at Federal Hall in New York City

- March 1, 1790: Made provisions for the first census, ch. 2, 1 Stat. 101
- March 26, 1790: Naturalization Act of 1790, ch. 3, 1 Stat. 103
- April 10, 1790: Patent Act of 1790, ch. 7, 1 Stat. 109
- April 30, 1790: Crimes Act of 1790, ch. 9, 1 Stat. 112
- May 31, 1790: Copyright Act of 1790, ch. 15, 1 Stat. 124
- July 16, 1790: Residence Act, ch. 28, 1 Stat. 130, established Washington, D.C., as the seat of government of the United States.
- July 22, 1790: Indian Intercourse Act of 1790, ch. 33, 1 Stat. 137, regulated commerce with the Indian tribes.
- August 4, 1790: Funding Act of 1790, ch. 34, 1 Stat. 138, authorized the "full assumption" of state debts by the federal government.
- August 4, 1790: Collection of Duties Act, ch.35, 1 Stat. 145, among its provisions is Sec. 62, 1 Stat. 175, authorizing establishment of the Revenue-Marine, since 1915 the United States Coast Guard.
- August 10, 1790: Tariff of 1790, ch. 39, 1 Stat. 180

=== Session 3 ===
Held December 6, 1790, through March 3, 1791, at Congress Hall in Philadelphia

- February 18, 1791: Admission of Vermont postdated to March 4, ch. 7, 1 Stat. 191
- February 25, 1791: First Bank of the United States was established, ch. 10, 1 Stat. 191
- March 3, 1791: Tariff of 1791, ch. 15, 1 Stat. 199, which triggered the Whiskey Rebellion.

== Constitutional amendments ==
- September 25, 1789: Approved 12 proposed articles of amendment to the United States Constitution to guarantee individual rights and establish limits on federal government power, and dispatched them to the state legislatures for ratification. 1 Stat. 97:
  - Article one has not been ratified and is still pending before the states.
  - Article two was ratified on May 7, 1992, as the Twenty-seventh Amendment.
  - Articles three through twelve were simultaneously ratified on December 15, 1791. Collectively called the "Bill of Rights," they were enumerated in the Constitution as Amendments I through X.

== States ratifying Constitution ==
- November 21, 1789: North Carolina became the 12th state to ratify the U.S. Constitution and thereby re-joined the Union.
- May 29, 1790: Rhode Island became the 13th state to ratify the U.S. Constitution and thereby re-joined the Union.

== Territories organized ==
- May 26, 1790: Territory South of the River Ohio organized from land ceded by North Carolina. 1 Stat. 123

== Party summary ==
There were no political parties in this Congress. Members are informally grouped into factions of similar interest, based on an analysis of their voting record.

Details on changes are shown below in the "Changes in membership" section.

=== Senate ===
Senate membership

Beginning of the Congress

End of the Congress

During this congress, two Senate seats were added for North Carolina and Rhode Island when each ratified the Constitution.

| | Faction (shading indicates faction control) | | Total | |
| | Anti-Administration (A) | Pro-Administration (P) | Total | Vacant |
|---|---|---|---|---|
| Begin March 4, 1789 | 7 | 13 | 20 | 2 |
| July 25, 1789 (Note: In New York: the state legislature failed to choose Senators until after Congress began.) | 7 | 14 | 21 | 1 |
| July 27, 1789 | 7 | 15 | 22 | 0 |
| November 27, 1789 (Note: In North Carolina, the state ratified the Constitution and elected two Senators.) | 7 | 17 | 24 | 0 |
| March 12, 1790 (Note: In Virginia, William Grayson died.) | 6 | 17 | 23 | 1 |
| March 31, 1790 (Note: In Virginia, John Walker was appointed to fill the vacancy created when William Grayson died.) | 6 | 18 | 24 | 0 |
| June 7, 1790 (Note: In Rhode Island, the state ratified the Constitution and elected two Senators.) | 7 | 19 | 26 | 0 |
| November 9, 1790 (Note: In Virginia, James Monroe was elected to fill the vacancy created when William Grayson died.) | 8 | 18 | 26 | 0 |
| November 13, 1790 (Note: In New Jersey, William Paterson resigned, having been elected Governor of New Jersey.) | 8 | 17 | 25 | 1 |
| November 23, 1790 (Note: In New Jersey, Philemon Dickinson was elected to fill the vacancy created when William Paterson resigned.) | 8 | 18 | 26 | 0 |
| Final voting share | 30.8% | 69.2% | | |
| Beginning of the next Congress | 8 | 17 | 25 | 1 |

=== House of Representatives ===
House membership

Beginning of the Congress

End of the Congress

During this congress, five House seats were added for North Carolina and one House seat was added for Rhode Island when they ratified the Constitution.

| | Faction (shading indicates faction control) | | Total | |
| | Anti-Administration (A) | Pro-Administration (P) | Total | Vacant |
|---|---|---|---|---|
| Begin March 4, 1789 | 23 | 31 | 54 | 5 |
| April 13, 1789 (Note: In South Carolina's 1st district, William Loughton Smith was seated late after a contested election.) | 23 | 32 | 55 | 4 |
| April 22, 1789 (Note: In New York's 5th district, Peter Silvester arrived late.) | 23 | 33 | 56 | 3 |
| April 23, 1789 (Note: In New York's 4th district, John Hathorn arrived late.) | 24 | 33 | 57 | 2 |
| May 9, 1789 (Note: In New York's 6th district, Jeremiah Van Rensselaer arrived late.) | 25 | 33 | 58 | 1 |
| June 23, 1789 (Note: In New Hampshire's at-large district, Abiel Foster was elected after Benjamin West refused to take his seat.) | 25 | 34 | 59 | 0 |
| March 19, 1790 (Note: North Carolina ratified the Constitution on November 21, 1789, and elected five members.) | 26 | 34 | 60 | 0 |
| March 24, 1790 | 27 | 34 | 61 | 0 |
| April 6, 1790 | 28 | 34 | 62 | 0 |
| April 19, 1790 | 28 | 35 | 63 | 0 |
| June 1, 1790 (Note: In Virginia's 9th district, Theodorick Bland died.) | 27 | 35 | 62 | 1 |
| June 16, 1790 | 27 | 36 | 63 | 1 |
| August 14, 1790 (Note: In Massachusetts's 5th district, George Partridge resigned.) | 27 | 35 | 62 | 2 |
| December 7, 1790 (Note: In Virginia's 9th district, William Branch Giles was elected to fill the vacancy created when Theodorick Bland died.) | 28 | 35 | 63 | 1 |
| December 17, 1790 (Note: Rhode Island ratified the constitution May 29, 1790 and elected one member.) | 28 | 36 | 64 | 1 |
| Final voting share | 43.7% | 56.3% | | |
| Beginning of the next Congress | 25 | 37 | 62 | 3 |

== Leadership ==
=== Senate ===
- President: John Adams (P)
- President pro tempore: John Langdon (P)

=== House of Representatives ===
- Speaker: Frederick Muhlenberg (P)

== Members ==
This list is arranged by chamber, then by state. Senators are listed by class, and representatives are listed by district.

Skip to House of Representatives, below

=== Senate ===
Senators were elected by the state legislatures every two years, with one-third beginning new six-year terms with each Congress. Preceding the names in the list below are Senate class numbers, which indicate the cycle of their election. In this Congress, all senators were newly elected, and Class 1 meant their term ended with this Congress, requiring re-election in 1790; Class 2 meant their term ended with the next Congress, requiring re-election in 1792; and Class 3 meant their term lasted through the next two Congresses, requiring re-election in 1794.

==== Connecticut ====
▌1. Oliver Ellsworth (P)
▌3. William Samuel Johnson (P)

==== Delaware ====
▌1. George Read (P)
▌2. Richard Bassett (A)

==== Georgia ====
▌2. William Few (A)
▌3. James Gunn (A)

==== Maryland ====
▌1. Charles Carroll of Carrollton (P)
▌3. John Henry (P)

==== Massachusetts ====
▌1. Tristram Dalton (P)
▌2. Caleb Strong (P)

==== New Hampshire ====
▌2. Paine Wingate (A)
▌3. John Langdon (P)

==== New Jersey ====
▌1. Jonathan Elmer (P)
▌2. William Paterson (P), until November 13, 1790

▌Philemon Dickinson (P), from December 6, 1790

==== New York ====
▌1. Philip Schuyler (P), from July 27, 1789
▌3. Rufus King (P), from July 25, 1789

==== North Carolina ====
▌2. Samuel Johnston (P), from November 27, 1789
▌3. Benjamin Hawkins (P), from November 27, 1789

==== Pennsylvania ====
▌1. William Maclay (A)
▌3. Robert Morris (P)

==== Rhode Island ====
▌1. Theodore Foster (P), from June 25, 1790
▌2. Joseph Stanton Jr. (A), from June 25, 1790

==== South Carolina ====
▌2. Pierce Butler (P)
▌3. Ralph Izard (P)

==== Virginia ====
▌1. William Grayson (A), until March 12, 1790

▌John Walker (P), March 31, 1790 – November 9, 1790
▌James Monroe (A), from November 9, 1790

▌2. Richard Henry Lee (A)

Senators' party membership by state at the opening of the 1st Congress in March 1789. 2 Anti-Administration 1 Anti-Administration and 1 Pro-Administration 2 Pro-Administration

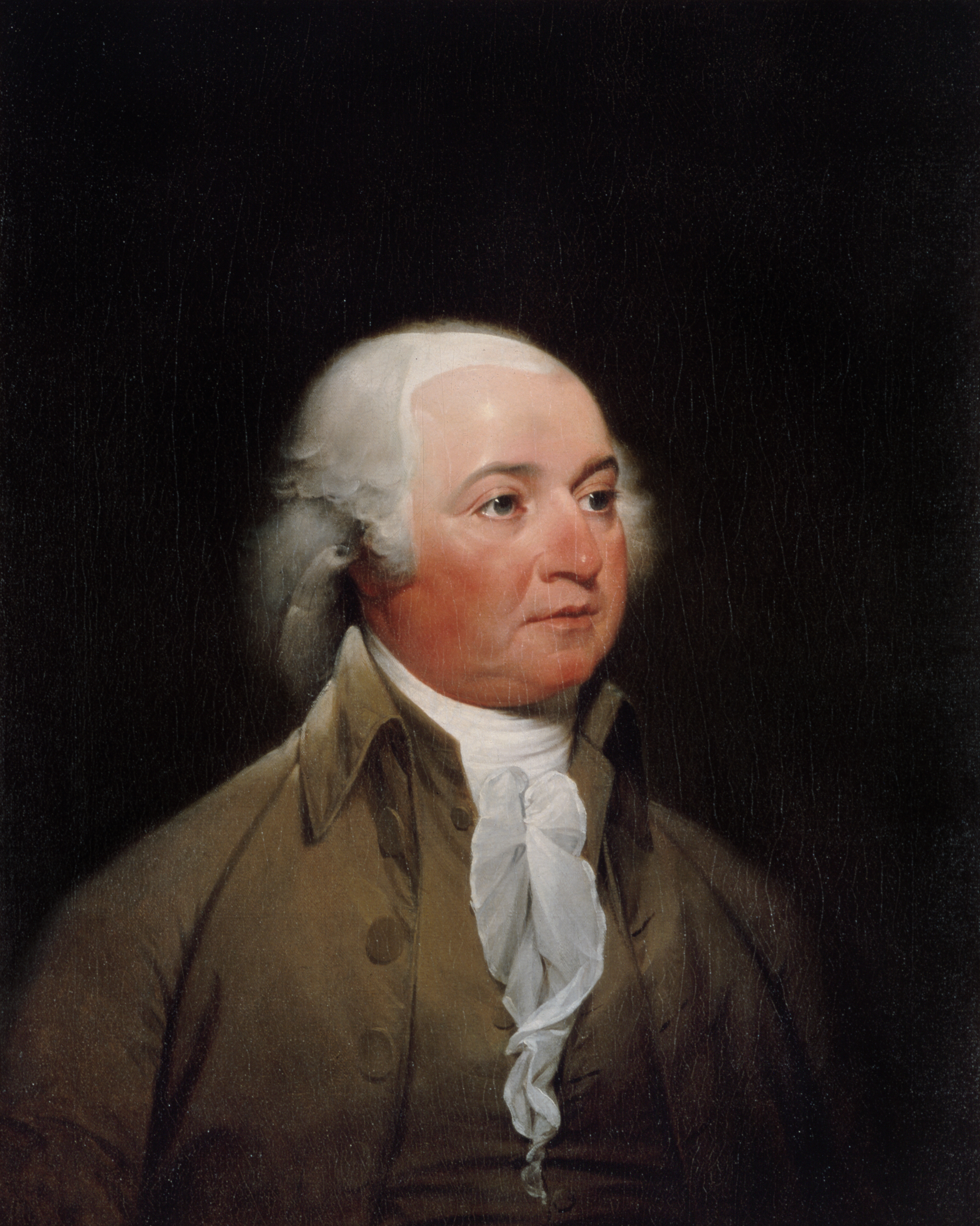
Senate President John Adams

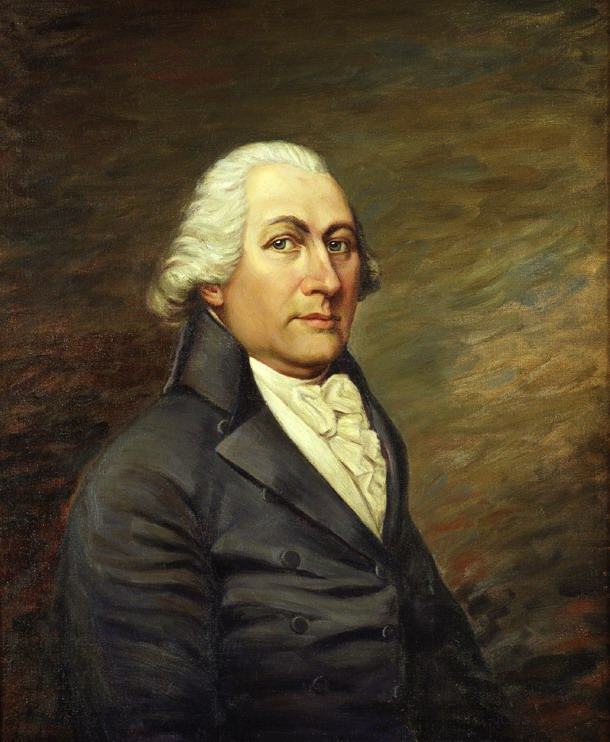
Senate President pro tempore John Langdon

=== House of Representatives ===
The names of representatives are listed by their districts.

==== Connecticut ====
All representatives were elected statewide on a general ticket.

▌At-large. Benjamin Huntington (P)
▌At-large. Roger Sherman (P)
▌At-large. Jonathan Sturges (P)
▌At-large. Jonathan Trumbull Jr. (P)
▌At-large. Jeremiah Wadsworth (P)

==== Delaware ====
▌At-large. John Vining (P)

==== Georgia ====
▌1. James Jackson (A)
▌2. Abraham Baldwin (A)
▌3. George Mathews (A)

==== Maryland ====
▌1. Michael Jenifer Stone (A)
▌2. Joshua Seney (A)
▌3. Benjamin Contee (A)
▌4. William Smith (A)
▌5. George Gale (P)
▌6. Daniel Carroll (P)

==== Massachusetts ====
▌1. Fisher Ames (P)
▌2. Benjamin Goodhue (P)
▌3. Elbridge Gerry (A)
▌4. Theodore Sedgwick (P)
▌5. George Partridge (P), until August 14, 1790, vacant thereafter
▌6. George Thatcher (P)
▌7. George Leonard (P)
▌8. Jonathan Grout (A)

==== New Hampshire ====
All representatives were elected statewide on a general ticket.

▌At-large. Abiel Foster (P), from June 23, 1789
▌At-large. Nicholas Gilman (P)
▌At-large. Samuel Livermore (A)

==== New Jersey ====
All representatives were elected statewide on a general ticket.

▌At-large. Elias Boudinot (P)
▌At-large. Lambert Cadwalader (P)
▌At-large. James Schureman (P)
▌At-large. Thomas Sinnickson (P)

==== New York ====
▌1. William Floyd (A)
▌2. John Laurance (P)
▌3. Egbert Benson (P)
▌4. John Hathorn (A), from April 23, 1789
▌5. Peter Silvester (P), from April 22, 1789
▌6. Jeremiah Van Rensselaer (A), from May 9, 1789

==== North Carolina ====
▌1. John Baptist Ashe (A), from March 24, 1790
▌2. Hugh Williamson (A), from March 19, 1790
▌3. Timothy Bloodworth (A), from April 6, 1790
▌4. John Steele (P), from April 19, 1790
▌5. John Sevier (P), from June 16, 1790

==== Pennsylvania ====
All representatives were elected statewide on a general ticket.

▌At-large. George Clymer (P)
▌At-large. Thomas Fitzsimons (P)
▌At-large. Thomas Hartley (P)
▌At-large. Daniel Hiester (A)
▌At-large. Frederick Muhlenberg (P)
▌At-large. Peter Muhlenberg (A)
▌At-large. Thomas Scott (P)
▌At-large. Henry Wynkoop (P)

==== Rhode Island ====
▌At-large. Benjamin Bourne (P), from December 17, 1790

==== South Carolina ====
▌1. William L. Smith (P), from April 13, 1789
▌2. Aedanus Burke (A)
▌3. Daniel Huger (P)
▌4. Thomas Sumter (A)
▌5. Thomas Tudor Tucker (A)

==== Virginia ====
▌1. Alexander White (P)
▌2. John Brown (A)
▌3. Andrew Moore (A)
▌4. Richard Bland Lee (P)
▌5. James Madison (P)
▌6. Isaac Coles (A)
▌7. John Page (A)
▌8. Josiah Parker (A)
▌9. Theodorick Bland (A), until June 1, 1790

▌William B. Giles (A), from December 7, 1790

▌10. Samuel Griffin (P)

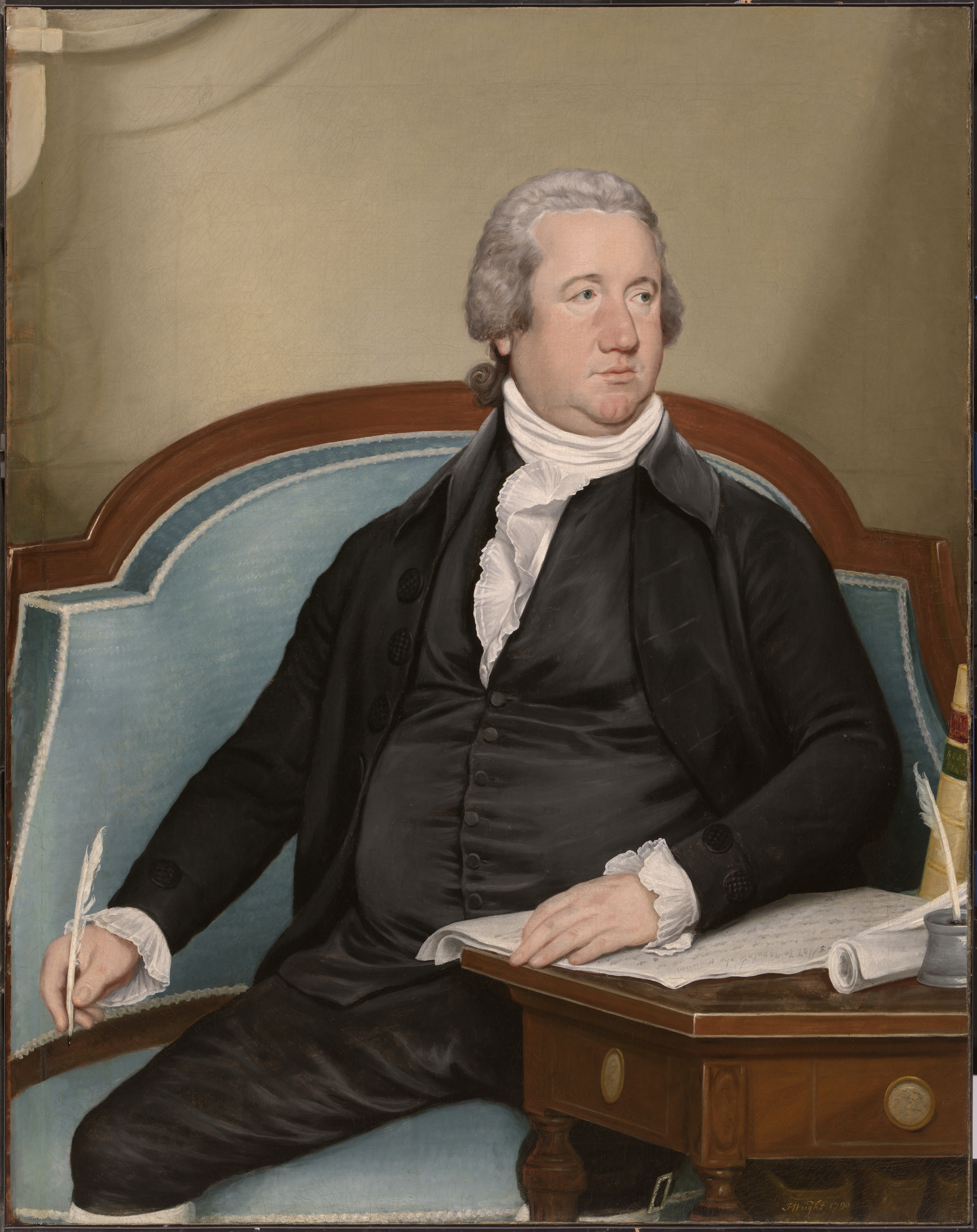
Speaker of the House Frederick Muhlenberg of Pennsylvania

== Changes in membership ==
There were no political parties in this Congress. Members are informally grouped into factions of similar interest, based on an analysis of their voting record.

New York, North Carolina, and Rhode Island were the last states to ratify the U.S. Constitution and, due to their late ratification, were unable to send full representation at the beginning of this Congress. Six Senators and nine Representatives were subsequently seated from these states during the sessions as noted.

=== Senate ===
There was 1 resignation, 1 death, 1 replacement of a temporary appointee, and 6 new seats. The Anti-Administration Senators picked up 1 new seat and the Pro-Administration Senators picked up 5 new seats.

Senate changes
| State (class) | Vacated by | Reason for change | Successor | Date of successor's formal installation (Note: When seated or oath administered, not necessarily when service began.) |
|---|---|---|---|---|
| New York (3) | New seats | State legislature failed to choose senator until after Congress began. | Rufus King (P) | July 25, 1789 |
| New York (1) | New seats | State legislature failed to choose senator until after Congress began. | Philip Schuyler (P) | July 27, 1789 |
| North Carolina (3) | New seats | North Carolina ratified the constitution on November 21, 1789. | Benjamin Hawkins (P) | Elected November 27, 1789 |
| North Carolina (2) | New seats | North Carolina ratified the constitution on November 21, 1789. | Samuel Johnston (P) | Elected November 27, 1789 |
| Virginia (1) | William Grayson (A) | Died March 12, 1790. | John Walker (P) | Appointed March 31, 1790 |
| Rhode Island (1) | New seats | Rhode Island ratified the constitution on May 29, 1790. | Theodore Foster (P) | Elected June 7, 1790 |
| Rhode Island (2) | New seats | Rhode Island ratified the constitution on May 29, 1790. | Joseph Stanton Jr. (A) | Elected June 7, 1790 |
| Virginia (1) | John Walker (P) | James Monroe was elected to the seat of Senator William Grayson. | James Monroe (A) | Elected November 9, 1790 |
| New Jersey (2) | William Paterson (P) | Resigned November 13, 1790, having been elected Governor of New Jersey. | Philemon Dickinson (P) | Elected November 23, 1790 |

=== House of Representatives ===
There was 2 resignations, 1 death, and 6 new seats. Anti-Administration members picked up 3 seats and Pro-Administration members picked up 2 seats.

House changes
| District | Vacated by | Reason for change | Successor | Date of successor's formal installation |
|---|---|---|---|---|
| New Hampshire at-large | Benjamin West (P) | Member-elect declined to serve and a new member was elected in the first congressional special election. | Abiel Foster (P) | June 23, 1789 |
| North Carolina 1 | New seats | North Carolina ratified the constitution November 21, 1789. | John Baptista Ashe (A) | March 24, 1790 |
| North Carolina 2 | New seats | North Carolina ratified the constitution November 21, 1789. | Hugh Williamson (A) | March 19, 1790 |
| North Carolina 3 | New seats | North Carolina ratified the constitution November 21, 1789. | Timothy Bloodworth (A) | April 6, 1790 |
| North Carolina 4 | New seats | North Carolina ratified the constitution November 21, 1789. | John Steele (P) | April 19, 1790 |
| North Carolina 5 | New seats | North Carolina ratified the constitution November 21, 1789. | John Sevier (P) | June 16, 1790 |
| Rhode Island at-large | New seat | Rhode Island ratified the constitution May 29, 1790. | Benjamin Bourne (P) | December 17, 1790 |
| Virginia 9 | Theodorick Bland (A) | Died June 1, 1790. | William B. Giles (A) | December 7, 1790 |
| Massachusetts 5 | George Partridge (P) | Resigned August 14, 1790. | Remained vacant until next Congress | |

== Committees ==
Lists of committees and their party leaders.

=== Senate ===
- Whole

=== House of Representatives ===
- Elections (Chairman: N/A)
- Rules (Select)
- Ways and Means (Chairman: Thomas Fitzsimons)
- Whole

=== Joint committees ===
- Enrolled Bills (Chairman: Paine Wingate)

== Employees ==
=== Senate ===
- Secretary: Samuel A. Otis, elected April 8, 1789
- Doorkeeper: James Mathers, elected April 7, 1789
- Chaplain:
  - Samuel Provoost (Episcopalian), elected April 25, 1789
  - William White (Episcopalian), elected December 9, 1790

=== House of Representatives ===
- Clerk: John J. Beckley
- Sergeant at Arms: Joseph Wheaton, elected May 12, 1789
- Doorkeeper: Gifford Dalley
- Chaplain:
  - William Linn (Presbyterian), elected May 1, 1789
  - Samuel Blair (Presbyterian), elected December 10, 1790

== See also ==
- 1788–89 United States elections (elections leading to this Congress)
  - 1788–89 United States presidential election
  - 1788–89 United States Senate elections
  - 1788–89 United States House of Representatives elections
- 1790 United States elections (elections during this Congress, leading to the next Congress)
  - 1790–91 United States Senate elections
  - 1790–91 United States House of Representatives elections
