= 1789 New Hampshire's at-large congressional district special election =

- June 22, 1789

New Hampshire's at-large congressional district
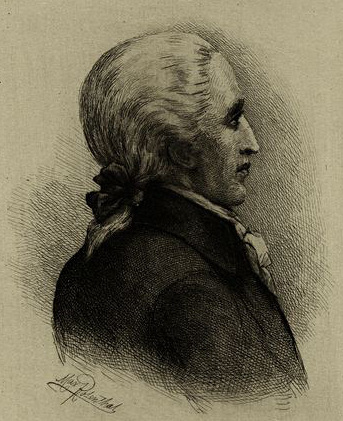

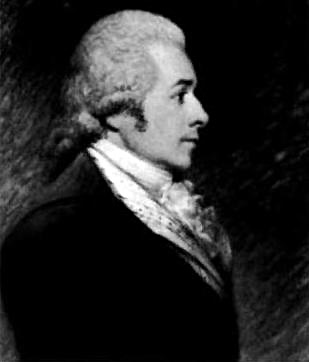

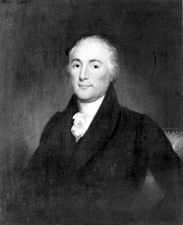
Candidate	Abiel Foster	John Samuel Sherburne	James Sheafe
Party	Pro-Administration	Anti-Administration	Pro-Administration
Popular vote	1,804	538	190
Percentage	59.3%	17.7%	6.2%
U.S. Representative before election
Vacant
Elected U.S. Representative
Abiel Foster
Pro-Administration

The 1789 New Hampshire's at-large congressional district special election was held on June 22, 1789, to fill a vacancy left by Representative-elect Benjamin West, who had declined to serve in the 1st United States Congress. This was the first special election in the history of the United States House of Representatives.

== Election results ==
1789 New Hampshire's at-large congressional district special election
Party	Candidate	Votes	%
Pro-Administration	Abiel Foster	1,804	59.26
Anti-Administration	John Samuel Sherburne	538	17.67
Pro-Administration	James Sheafe	190	6.24
	Elisha Payne	139	4.57
	Joshua Atherton	112	3.68
Anti-Administration	Nathaniel Peabody	86	2.83
Pro-Administration	Simeon Olcott	76	2.50
	Scattering	99	3.25
Total votes		3,044	100.00
Pro-Administration win (new seat)			

== See also ==
- 1788 and 1789 United States House of Representatives elections
- List of special elections to the United States House of Representatives
