= 1790 New Hampshire gubernatorial election =

- March 9, 1790
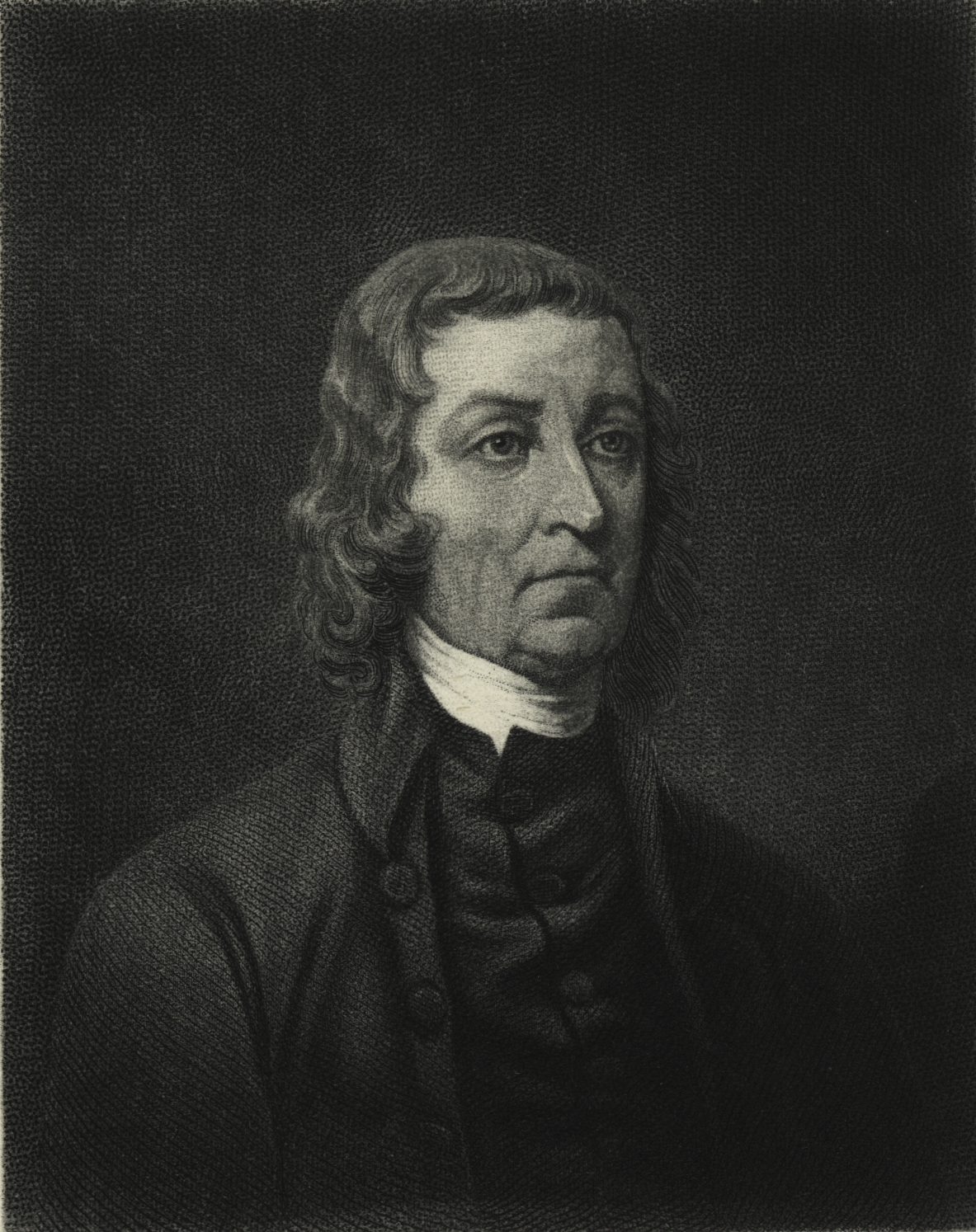

Nominee	Josiah Bartlett	John Pickering	Joshua Wentworth
Party	Anti-Federalist
Popular vote	1,676	3,189	2,369
Percentage	21.59%	41.09%	30.52%
President before election
John Sullivan
Federalist
Elected President
Josiah Bartlett
Anti-Federalist

The 1790 New Hampshire gubernatorial election was held on March 9, 1790, in order to elect the President of New Hampshire. (The office would be renamed to Governor in 1792.) Third time Anti-Federalist candidate Josiah Bartlett defeated former Acting President John Pickering, Joshua Wentworth and former delegate to the Continental Congress Nathaniel Peabody. Since no candidate received a majority in the popular vote, Bartlett was elected by the New Hampshire General Court per the state constitution, despite placing third in the popular vote.

== General election ==
On election day, March 9, 1790, former Acting President John Pickering won the popular vote by a margin of 820 votes against his foremost opponent Joshua Wentworth. But because no candidate received a majority of the popular vote, a separate election was held by the New Hampshire General Court, which chose Anti-Federalist candidate Josiah Bartlett as the winner, despite Bartlett having only received 21.59% of the vote and having placed third. Bartlett thereby gained Anti-Federalist control over the office of President. Bartlett was sworn in as the fourth President of New Hampshire on June 5, 1790.

=== Results ===
New Hampshire gubernatorial election, 1790
Party	Candidate	Votes	%
Anti-Federalist	Josiah Bartlett	1,676	21.59
	John Pickering	3,189	41.09
	Joshua Wentworth	2,369	30.42
Anti-Federalist	Nathaniel Peabody	294	3.79
	Scattering	234	3.01
Total votes		7,762	100.00
Anti-Federalist gain from Federalist			
