= Shearjashub Bourne =

American politician (1746-1806)

Member of the U.S. House of Representatives from Massachusetts
- In office March 4, 1791 – March 3, 1795 Serving with Peleg Coffin Jr. (3rd District-GT)
- Preceded by: George Partridge
- Succeeded by: Samuel Lyman
- Constituency: 5th district (1791–93); 3rd district (1793–95)

Member of the Massachusetts House of Representatives
- In office 1788–1790

Member of the Massachusetts House of Representatives
- In office 1782–1785

Personal details
- Born: June 14, 1746 Barnstable, Province of Massachusetts Bay, British America
- Died: March 11, 1806 (aged 59) Boston, Massachusetts, U.S.
- Party: Pro-Administration
- Education: Harvard College, 1764

Shearjashub Bourne (June 14, 1746 – March 11, 1806) was an American lawyer, jurist, and politician from Massachusetts who served in the Massachusetts House of Representatives and United States House of Representatives.

== Early life ==
Bourne was born in Barnstable in the Province of Massachusetts Bay on June 14, 1746, the son of Timothy and Elizabeth Bourne.

He graduated from Harvard University in 1764, studied law and became an attorney in Barnstable. He served in local office including justice of the peace. Among the individuals who studied law with him and later embarked on their own legal careers was Lot Hall, who served as a Justice of the Vermont Supreme Court.

== Political career ==
From 1782 to 1785 and 1788 to 1790 he served in the Massachusetts House of Representatives. He was also a delegate to the Massachusetts convention which ratified the U.S. Constitution.

Bourne represented Massachusetts in the United States House of Representatives from March 4, 1791, to March 3, 1795. He later served as Chief Justice of the Suffolk County, Massachusetts Court of Common Pleas. He died in Boston on March 11, 1806.

U.S. House of Representatives
| Preceded by George Partridge | Member of the U.S. House of Representatives from Massachusetts's 5th congressional district March 4, 1791 – March 3, 1793 | Succeeded by District eliminated |
| Preceded by Elbridge Gerry | Member of the U.S. House of Representatives from Massachusetts's 3rd congressional district (alongside Peleg Coffin, Jr. on a General ticket); March 4, 1793 – March 3, 1795 | Succeeded by Samuel Lyman |
Legal offices
| Preceded by | Justice of the Court of Common Pleas of Suffolk County; 1799 - March 11, 1806 | Succeeded by |
