= Jedediah Strong =

American politician and judge (1738–1802)

Jedediah Strong (Jedidiah, in some sources; November 7, 1738 – August 21, 1802) was a member of the Governor's Council, or Upper House of the Connecticut Assembly, and a judge of the Connecticut Supreme Court of Errors from 1789 to 1791.

== Early life, education, and career ==
Born in Litchfield, Connecticut, Strong was the sixth child of Supply Strong (originally of Hebron, Connecticut, and in 1723 one of the first settlers of Litchfield) and Supply's second wife, Anne. Strong received a Bachelor of Arts from Yale College in 1761, and a Master of Arts in 1764. He studied theology, and was licensed to preach by the Hartford North Association of Ministers on October 4, 1763. However, he almost immediately turned his attention to law, and after a year of study was admitted (in 1764) to the Bar of Hartford County. He then began practicing law in Litchfield.

== Political career ==
From 1770 to 1783, Strong served as one of the Selectmen of Litchfield, and from 1773 to 1781 was Town Clerk. In October, 1771, he attended the Connecticut General Assembly as one of the Representatives from Litchfield, and from then until 1780 he sat as a Representative in thirty regular sessions of the Assembly. At thirteen of these sessions he was Clerk of the Lower House. In 1774 he was chosen a Delegate to the Continental Congress, but declined the office. From 1780 to 1791 he was a Judge of the Litchfield County Court. During the Revolutionary War he was a Commissary of Supplies for the Continental Army. In 1788 he was a member of the State Convention which adopted the Constitution of the United States, and in 1781 and 1790 he was a member of the Governor's Council, or Upper House of the Connecticut Assembly. He was an unsuccessful candidate for one of Connecticut's five at-large seats in the 1788 United States House of Representatives election in Connecticut.

== Personal life and decline ==
On April 17, 1774, Strong married Ruth Patterson (born June 16, 1739), daughter of Major John Patterson of Farmington, Connecticut. She died October 3, 1777, leaving a daughter, and on January 22, 1788, Strong married Susannah Wyllys, daughter of the Hon. George Wyllys. She was about twelve years his junior, and in July, 1790, after two and a half years of married life, she "was compelled by his cruel behavior to apply for a divorce", which was granted by the Governor's Council, of which Strong was then a member. Strong "was then cast out of all decent society", having "already forfeited the esteem of his fellow-townsmen by his bad private character, although by hypocrisy and political intrigue he had been able up to this date to impose upon a wider public". He was "a man of diminutive figure, limping gait and an unpleasant countenance", and is said to have succeeded in gaining his great ascendancy in his town and district "by his arts as a pettifogger and a politician". Strong later became an alcoholic, and it was deemed necessary to have a guardian appointed over him. His means became exhausted, and the town was obliged to assist in his support until his death.
