= Nathaniel Peabody =

American physician (1741–1823)

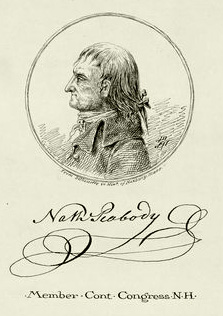
Nathaniel Peabody

Nathaniel Peabody (March 1, 1741 – June 27, 1823) was an American medical doctor from Rockingham County, New Hampshire. He represented New Hampshire as a delegate to the Continental Congress in 1779 and 1780.

== Biography ==
Nathaniel was born to Jacob Peabody in Topsfield, Massachusetts. He attended local common schools and the studied medicine with his father. In 1761, he removed to Plaistow, New Hampshire and began the practice of medicine. He was to remain a resident of Rockingham County for the rest of his life, but in 1761 he moved his practice to the larger town of Exeter.

Dr. Peabody became active in county affairs and the New Hampshire Militia. He was made a Lt. Colonel in the militia and participated in the early stages of the Revolution including the raid on Fort William and Mary in December 1774. After this event, he resigned his commission, since it came from the crown through the royal government.

Nathaniel was elected to New Hampshire's revolutionary assembly in 1776. He would ultimately serve in the state's lower house in 1776–1779, 1781–1785, 1787–1790, and 1793–1796. Also in 1776, he became a member of the Committee of Safety, which acted as a revolutionary government when the assembly was not in session. In 1777, he was named the Adjutant General of the state militia, and held that post until 1779.

Peabody was named to the Continental Congress on April 3, 1779, to replace Josiah Bartlett, who had resigned that post. Peabody served in congress through the 1780 session. He was a member in 1782, when the New Hampshire convention met to create a constitution for the new state, and served as chairman of the drafting committee. Under the new constitution, he represented Rockingham County in the State Senate in 1785–1786 and 1790–1793. Although re-appointed to the national congress in 1785, he did not attend any sessions. He unsuccessfully ran for New Hampshire's at-large congressional district 5 times: in 1788, a June 1789 special election, 1790, 1792, and 1796 (as a Democratic-Republican). He was also a candidate in the 1790 gubernatorial election and the 1792 U.S. Senate election.

During the later years of his life, Peabody's support for the revolution caused him trouble. For about 20 years he was confined to the parole limits for debtors at the Exeter jail. He died Exeter in 1823, and was reportedly buried in the Old Cemetery in South Hampton, but the exact location is uncertain.
