= Solomon Stoddard (politician) =

American lawyer and public official (1771–1860)

Solomon Stoddard (February 18, 1771 – October 16, 1860) was an American politician.

He was the son of Solomon Stoddard and was born in Northampton, Massachusetts, and grandson of the pastor of the same name. After graduating from Yale University in 1790, he entered as a law student the office of the Caleb Strong. On admission to the bar he practised law for a year and a half in Williamstown, Massachusetts, and then settled for life in his native town. Here he continued the active duties of his profession until 1810, when he was chosen register of deeds for Hampshire County, Massachusetts.

In 1821 he was appointed clerk of the courts of the same county, which office he resigned in 1837. Several times he was sent by the town as representative to the Massachusetts General Court, and he filled moreover with great fidelity many offices of trust in "the region of his residence." At the age of 67 he retired from public life.

In 1799 he married Sarah Tappan, sister to Benjamin Tappan, Arthur Tappan, and Lewis Tappan. She died in 1852. They had eight children, seven sons and one daughter, the eldest being, Professor Solomon Stoddard, and the youngest, Rev. David Tappan Stoddard; their son Arthur Francis Stoddard was an industrialist. He died at Northampton aged 89.
