= Eleazer McComb =

American politician

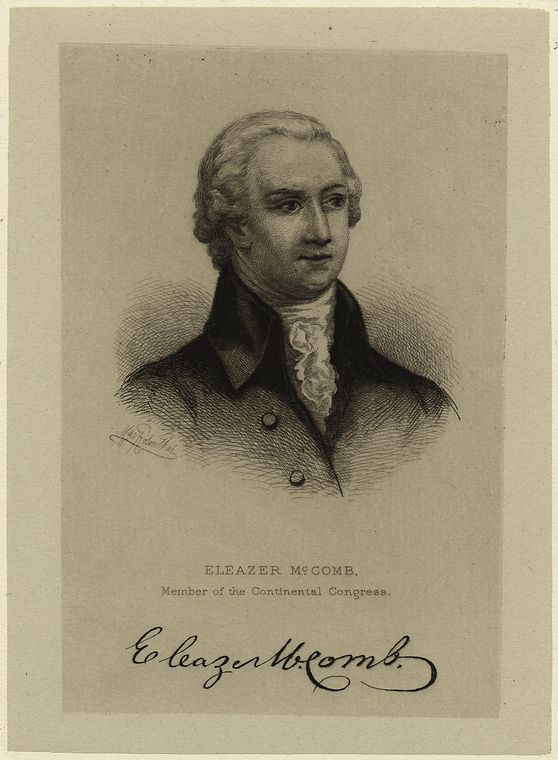
Eleazer McComb

Eleazer McComb (August 11, 1740 – December 1798) was an American merchant from Dover, Delaware. He was a delegate from Delaware to the Continental Congress from March 1783 until January 1784. He moved to Wilmington, Delaware, in 1792 and died there in December 1798.

Eleazer was one of five children of James McComb and a mother whose name is unknown. His parents came to America about 1732 from Ireland, although the family was originally from Scotland. His siblings were: Helena born about 1732 who married Robert Stockton of Princeton; John born 1734 in Princeton who married Mary Davis; Mary born 1736 in Princeton never married; James born 1739 in Princeton who married Brigitha Mott. Eleazer married Lydia Irons. He and his wife died in a yellow fever epidemic in 1798 in Wilmington. Their children were Thomas Irons McComb born 1766, Jennett McComb born 1780 who married Thomas Clayton, Elizabeth McComb, and James Bellach McComb.

McComb is pictured as Figure #6 in the John Trumbull 1824 painting General George Washington Resigning His Commission, which was featured on the reverse of the United States five-thousand-dollar bill.
