= George Partridge =

American politician (1740–1828)

- George Partridge c. 1790, an early hand-copy of the original by Rufus Hathaway

Member of the U.S. House of Representatives from Massachusetts's 5th district
- In office March 4, 1789 – August 14, 1790
- Preceded by: District created
- Succeeded by: Shearjashub Bourne

Delegate from Massachusetts to the Continental Congress
- In office 1779–1785

Representative to the Massachusetts House of Representatives
- In office 1775–1779

Representative to the Massachusetts Provincial Congress
- In office 1774–1775

Personal details
- Born: February 8, 1740 Duxbury, Province of Massachusetts Bay, British America
- Died: July 7, 1828 (aged 88) Duxbury, Massachusetts, U.S.

George Partridge (February 8, 1740 – July 7, 1828) was an American teacher and politician. He represented Massachusetts as a delegate to the Continental Congress and as a Representative in the U.S. House.

== Background ==
Partridge was born in Duxbury in the Province of Massachusetts Bay, and attended Harvard College, graduating in 1762 and obtaining a master's degree in 1765. He studied theology but never entered the active ministry. Instead, he became a school teacher in Kingston.

== Political career ==
In 1774, Partridge was elected as a delegate to the Massachusetts Provincial Congress, a provisional government formed to replace the Massachusetts General Court which had been suspended by Royal Governor Gen. Thomas Gage. Of the first meeting of the Provincial Congress, Partridge wrote:

Gen. Gage said he had come over with his troops and proclamations to frighten us rebels into submission! We soon had his mandate, dissolving the General Court ... So we met [in Salem]. And in a short time we began to ask one another, What can we do? The worst must come to the worst! ... Shall we submit to Great Britain? ... Or shall we resist her encroachments to the point of the sword? ... The gulf is passed. We will have a Congress at Concord. We will send letters to all the colonies and urge them to send delegates to meet at Philadelphia ... We will go to our homes and wake everyone that sleeps!

Partridge then served with the Massachusetts House of Representatives from 1775 to 1779. In 1779 the legislature named him a delegate to the Continental Congress. He was reappointed continuously until 1785, although he missed the session held in Princeton, New Jersey, in 1783. He was a charter member of the American Academy of Arts and Sciences in 1780.

When the new government of the United States was installed Partridge was elected to the First United States Congress as a representative of Massachusetts's 5th congressional district. He served from March 4, 1789, until he resigned on August 14, 1790. He was elected a member of the American Antiquarian Society in 1814. The record shows, Gales & Seaton, page 1836, that on Friday, December 10, 1790, George Partridge from Massachusetts appeared in the House of Representatives and took his seat. On Tuesday, February 8, 1791, Representative George Partridge was present in the House and voted for the bill to charter a Bank of the United States ---Gales & Seaton, page 2012.

Partridge died at home in Duxbury in 1828 and is buried in the Mayflower Cemetery there.

== Partridge Academy ==
Upon his death, Partridge bequeathed $10,000 to form a private secondary school in Duxbury. This led to the establishment of Patridge Academy which was built on Tremont Street in Duxbury in 1844. The Academy served as the town's only secondary school until the construction of the first Duxbury High School in 1927. Partridge Academy burned in 1933 and its location is now occupied by the Duxbury Town Offices.

== Legacy ==
Partridge appears in John Trumbull's 1824 painting General George Washington Resigning His Commission, which was featured on the reverse of the United States five-thousand-dollar bill.

U.S. House of Representatives
Preceded by District created	Member of the U.S. House of Representatives from Massachusetts's 5th congressional district March 4, 1789 – August 14, 1790	Succeeded by Shearjashub Bourne
