= Jonathan Grout =

American politician (1737–1807)

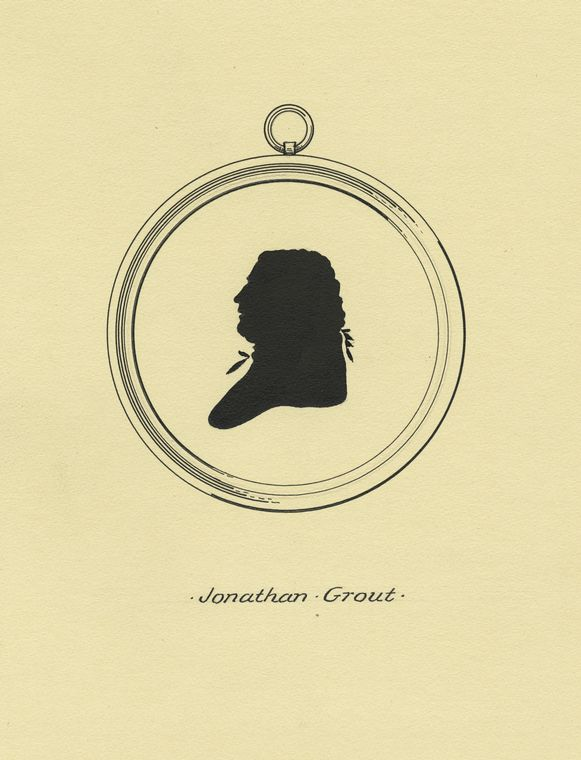

Member of the U.S. House of Representatives from Massachusetts's 8th district
- In office March 4, 1789 – March 3, 1791
- Preceded by: District created
- Succeeded by: George Thatcher

Personal details
- Born: July 23, 1737 Lunenburg, Province of Massachusetts Bay, British America
- Died: September 8, 1807 (aged 70) Dover, New Hampshire, U.S.
- Party: Democratic-Republican
- Occupation: Lawyer

Jonathan Grout (July 23, 1737 – September 8, 1807) was a member of the United States House of Representatives from Massachusetts. Grout was born in Lunenburg in the Province of Massachusetts Bay and served in the First United States Congress.

His son, Jonathan Grout Jr., built the first optical telegraph in the United States, connecting Martha's Vineyard and Boston.

A descendant of his was Edward M. Grout (1861–1931), a lawyer and New York City Comptroller.

U.S. House of Representatives
Preceded by District created	Member of the U.S. House of Representatives from Massachusetts's 8th congressional district March 4, 1789 – March 3, 1791	Succeeded by George Thatcher
