= Timothy Paine House =

Historic house in Massachusetts, United States

- U.S. National Register of Historic Places
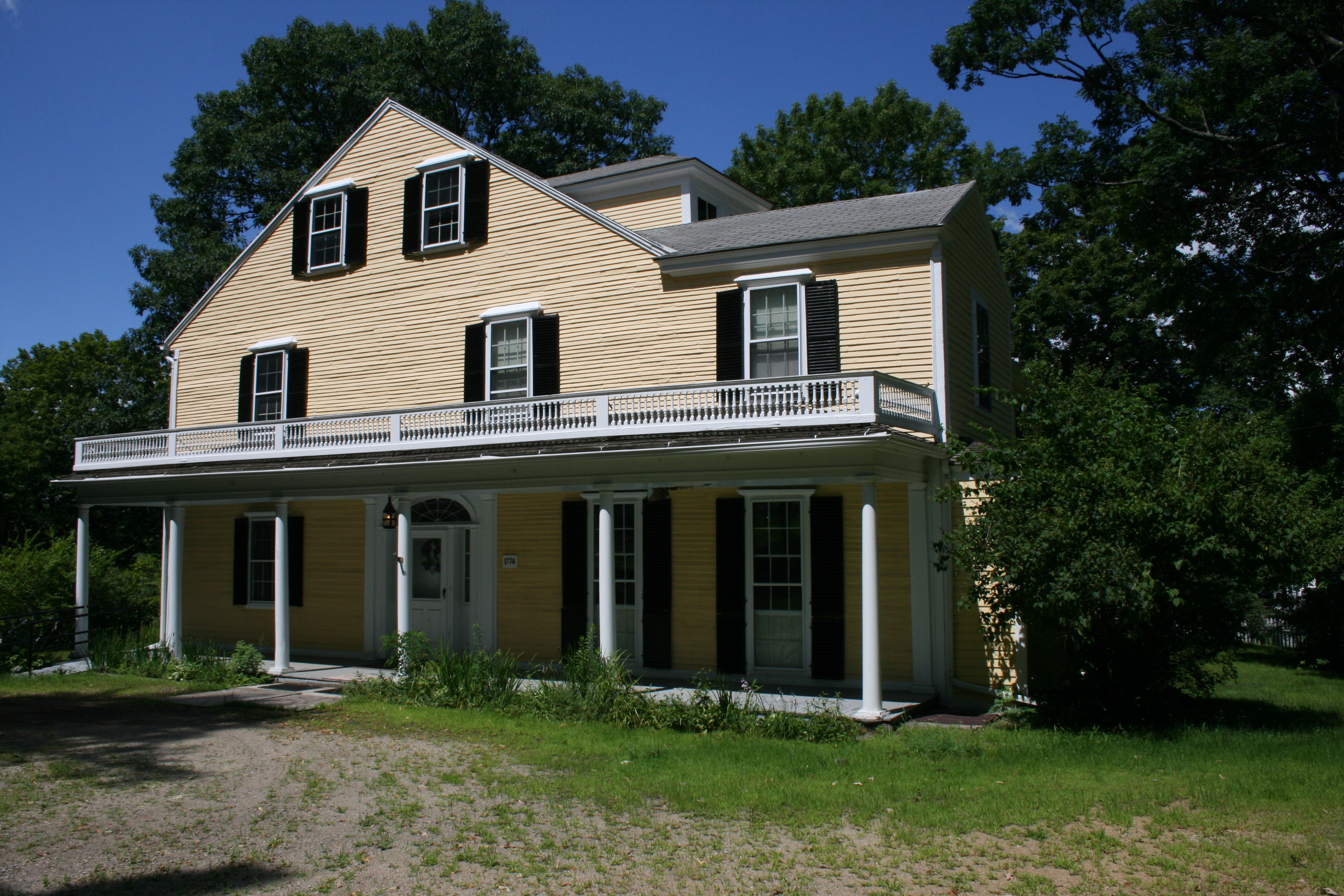

- Location within Massachusetts Location within the United States
- Location: 140 Lincoln St., Worcester, Massachusetts
- Coordinates: 42°16′41″N 71°47′42″W
- Area: 1 acre (0.40 ha)
- Built: c. 1774
- MPS: Worcester MRA
- NRHP reference No.: 76000948
- Added to NRHP: April 30, 1976

The Timothy Paine House, also known as The Oaks, is a historic house at 140 Lincoln Street in Worcester, Massachusetts. Built in the mid-1770s, it is one of the city's oldest buildings, and a good example of Georgian and Federal styling. It was built by Timothy Paine, a noted local judge who during the American Revolution was confronted by a mob of citizens from Worcester due to his Loyalist leanings. The house has been owned by the Colonel Timothy Bigelow Chapter of the Daughters of the American Revolution, since 1914 and uses it as a chapter house. It is open for tours from May- October or by appointment. The house was listed on the National Register of Historic Places in 1976.

== Description and history ==
The Timothy Paine House is located in northeastern Worcester, set on a 1-acre (0.40 ha) lot between Lincoln and Paine Streets in the Brittan Square area. It is set back from Lincoln Street, which was historically the main road between Worcester and Boston. It is a 2 1/2-story wood-frame structure, with a gabled roof and clapboarded exterior. The house's main entrance was originally on its south facade, but a new main entrance was placed on the east (Lincoln Street) facade some time after its construction.

Timothy Paine acquired 300 acres (120 ha) of land in this part of Worcester in 1767 and began developing it as a country estate in 1774. His Loyalist leanings were noted early in the American Revolution, and he was forced by a mob to resign his post as mandamus councilor to the Royal Governor of Massachusetts. While he complied and resigned his post as mandamus councilor, he continued his work as Register of Deeds for Worcester County and remained a respected member of the community during the Revolution. His son William, who had served for the British army as Surgeon-General, returned after American independence and inherited the property after the death of his father. The house was significantly enlarged and given Federal styling during his ownership. It passed through three more generations of Paines until 1914, when it was purchased by the local DAR chapter.

== See also ==
- National Register of Historic Places listings in eastern Worcester, Massachusetts
