= Benjamin West (New Hampshire lawyer) =

American lawyer (1746–1817)

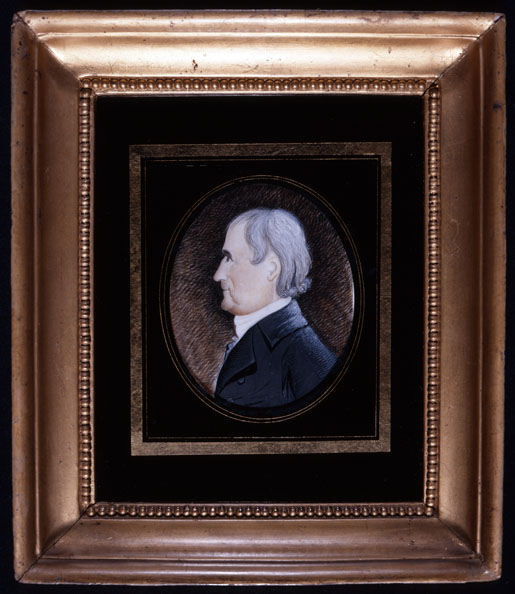

Member-elect of the U.S. House of Representatives from New Hampshire's at-large district
- Declined to serve
- Preceded by: Constituency established
- Succeeded by: Abiel Foster

Personal details
- Born: March 28, 1746 Tisbury, Massachusetts Bay, British America
- Died: July 29, 1817 (aged 71) Charlestown, New Hampshire, U.S.
- Party: Pro-Administration
- Education: Harvard University (BA)

Benjamin West (March 28, 1746 – July 29, 1817) was an American lawyer.

== Biography ==
West was born in Tisbury, Massachusetts. In 1768, West graduated from Harvard College; he served briefly as a minister in Wrentham, Massachusetts. West then studied law in New Hampshire. From 1777 to 1779, West worked as a tutor for a planter in Charleston, South Carolina. He then practiced law in Charlestown, New Hampshire. West refused to serve in public office: not in the United States House of Representatives (after the election of 1788–1789), nor as New Hampshire Attorney General, or even as probate judge. West also refused membership in the American Antiquarian Society. In 1814, West did serve as a delegate to the Hartford Convention. West died in Charlestown, New Hampshire.

== See also ==
- List of United States representatives-elect who never took their seats

U.S. House of Representatives
New constituency	Member-elect of the U.S. House of Representatives from New Hampshire's at-large congressional district 1788–1789	Succeeded by Abiel Foster
