= Bay Park (Bay Park, New York) =

County park in Nassau County, Long Island

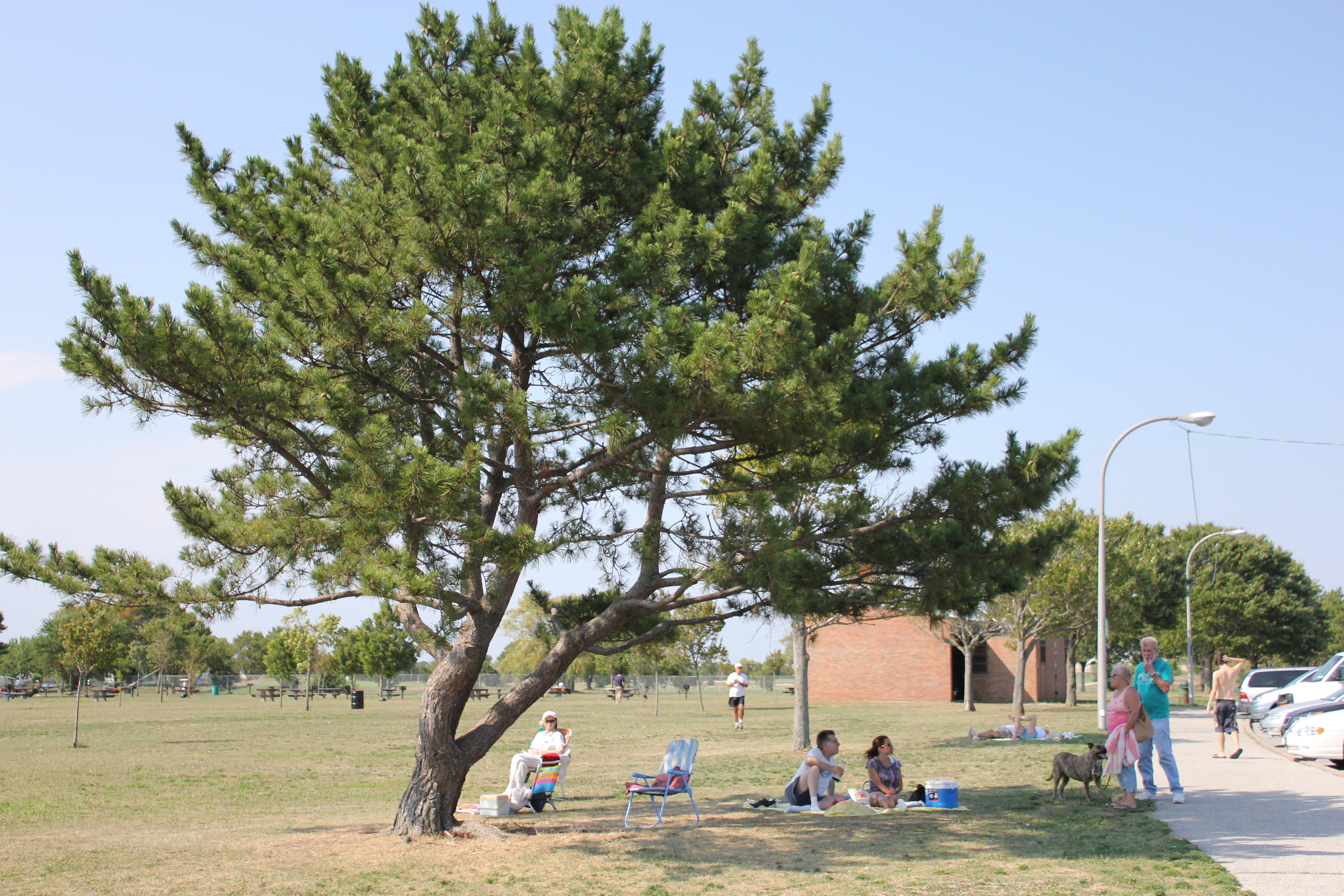
- Bay Park in 2010.
- Interactive map of Bay Park
- Type: Public
- Location: Bay Park, New York, United States
- Coordinates: 40°37′40″N 73°39′51″W
- Area: 96 acres (39 ha)
- Elevation: 20 ft (6.1 m)
- Owner: Nassau County, New York
- Operator: Nassau County, New York
- Website: www.nassaucountyny.gov/2789/Bay-Park

Bay Park is a Nassau County-owned park in Bay Park, in Nassau County, on Long Island, in New York, United States.

== Description ==
Bay Park entered Nassau County's park system in 1947. The park is roughly 96 acres (39 ha) in total area.

Amenities at the park include a golf course, a playground, picnic areas, sports fields, a dog park, and fishing and boating facilities.

The golf course within Bay Park consists of 9 holes. A controversy took place in the late 1960s regarding this golf course. Many Nassau residents grew frustrated over fact that the golf course was closed; the closure resulted from cuts to Nassau's budget, as the funds needed to hire personnel were not available. Although the golf course was eventually opened that summer during daylight hours, other areas of the park would remain closed for the season due to the funding issues.

According to the United States Geological Survey, Bay Park is located 20 feet (6 m) above sea level.

== See also ==
- Cantiague Park – Another major park owned and operated by Nassau County.
- Christopher Morley Park – Another major park owned and operated by Nassau County.
- Eisenhower Park – Another major park owned and operated by Nassau County.
- Wantagh Park – Another major park owned and operated by Nassau County.
