= Christopher Morley Park =

Public park in North Hills, New York, US

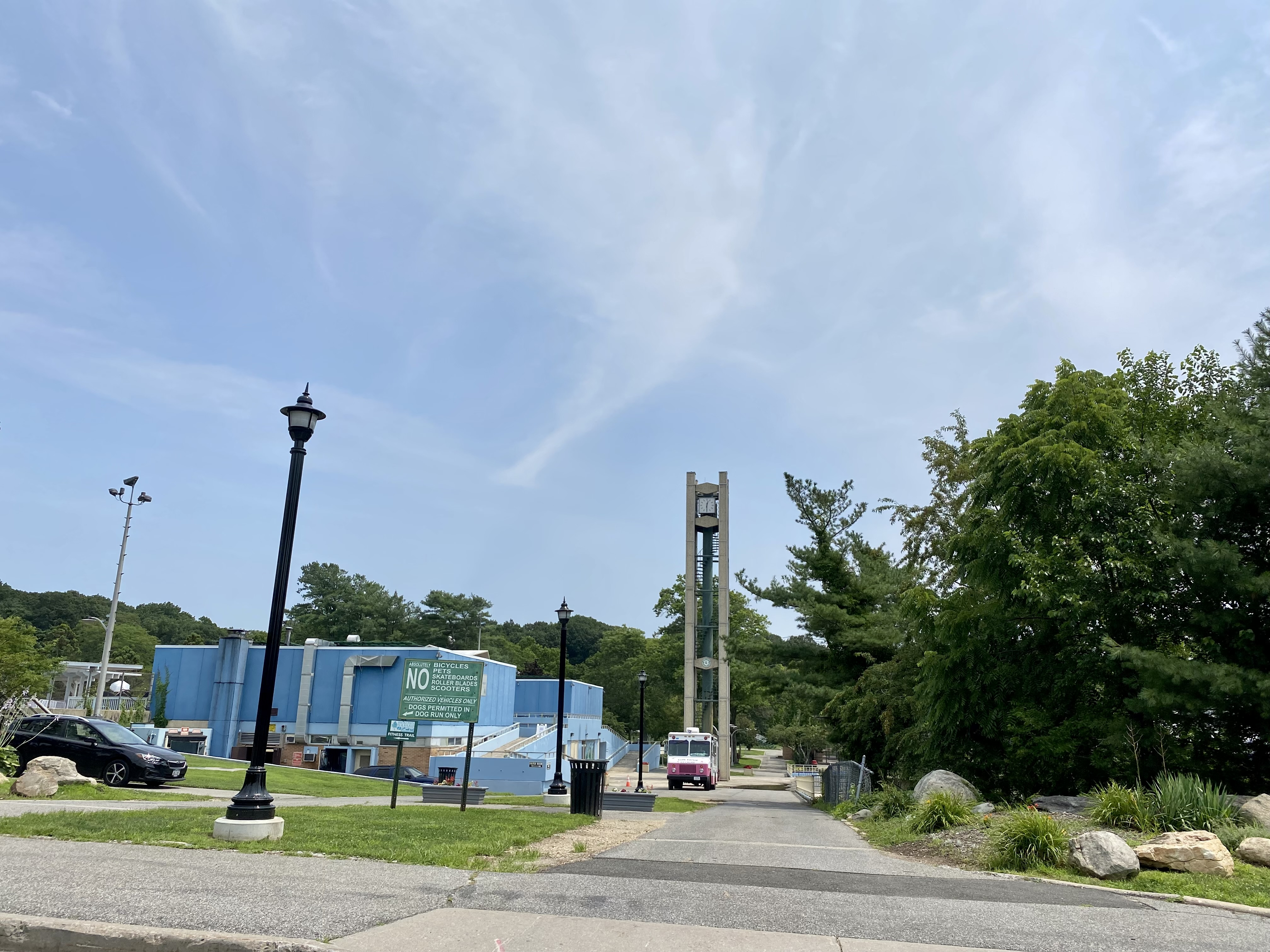
- The clock tower at Christopher Morley Park on July 22, 2021
- Interactive map of Christopher Morley Park
- Type: Public
- Location: North Hills, New York
- Coordinates: 40°47′5″N 73°39′42″W
- Area: 98 acres (40 ha)
- Created: 1961
- Owner: Nassau County, New York
- Operator: Nassau County Department of Parks, Recreation and Museums
- Parking: Yes
- Website: www.nassaucountyny.gov/2794/Christopher-Morley-Park

Christopher Morley Park is a public, Nassau County-owned park in the Incorporated Village of North Hills, on Long Island, New York, United States.

== Description ==
The park first opened in 1961. It is named for and dedicated after the late writer Christopher Morley, who lived a few blocks away in Roslyn Estates. It occupies 98 acres (40 ha) of land, and was once part of the Nettie Ryan Estate. The County of Nassau purchased the estate for roughly $700,000 (1961 USD).

The park contains:

- A dog Park
- Playgrounds
- Walking Paths
- Outdoor Swimming Pools
- A 9-Hole Golf Course
- 3 Ballfields
- Outdoor Ice Skating
- 4 Basketball Courts
- 2 Pickleball Courts
- Paddleball Courts
- Shuffle Board
- Picnic Area
- Fitness Trail

== The Knothole ==
Christopher Morley Park also is home to "The Knothole," Morley's writing studio. In 1961, a group of local residents wanted to save the Knothole and relocate it to city ground in Roslyn park or on a rented property. The Knothole was located on Morley's past estate, Green Escape, located in Roslyn Estates.

In 1962, a proposal was approved by Nassau County Executive Eugene H. Nickerson to move the Knothole to a county park in North Hills. In 1966, the Knothole was transported to the park, which itself bears Morley's Name. The renovated Knothole includes built-in bookshelves, a fireplace and a bunkbed. The Knothole's "dymaxion" bathroom was designed in 1936 by Morley's friend, Buckminster Fuller, the renowned scientist and inventor.

== See also ==
- Bay Park (Bay Park, New York) – Another major park owned and operated by Nassau County.
- Cantiague Park – Another major park owned and operated by Nassau County.
- Eisenhower Park – Another major park owned and operated by Nassau County.
- Wantagh Park – Another major park owned and operated by Nassau County.
