= Eisenhower Park =

Park in East Meadow, New York, U.S.

Coordinates: 40.734706°N 73.573058°W

- Dwight D. Eisenhower Memorial Park
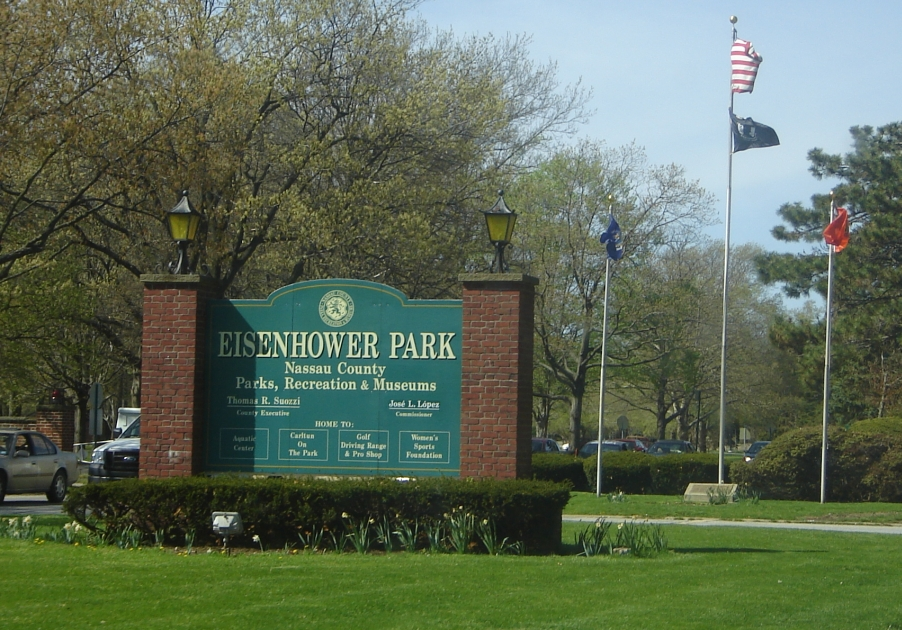
- Eisenhower Park's main entrance in 2007
- Interactive map of Eisenhower Park
- Type: Public
- Location: East Meadow; Nassau County, New York, United States
- Area: 930 acres (380 ha)
- Opened: October 1, 1949
- Owner: County of Nassau
- Operator: Nassau County Department of Parks, Recreation and Museums
- Parking: Yes
- Website: www.nassaucountyny.gov/2797/Eisenhower-Park

Eisenhower Park – officially known as Dwight D. Eisenhower Memorial Park and formerly as Salisbury Park – is a public park in East Meadow, in Nassau County, New York, United States. It is bordered by Hempstead Turnpike (NY 24) on the south and Old Country Road (CR 25) on the north.

At 930 acres (3.8 km^{2}), the park is larger than Manhattan's Central Park. Much of the park's area devoted to three 18-hole golf courses – including the Red Course, host to the annual Commerce Bank Championship (Champions Tour). The park is home to the September 11th Memorial for residents of Nassau County.

== History ==
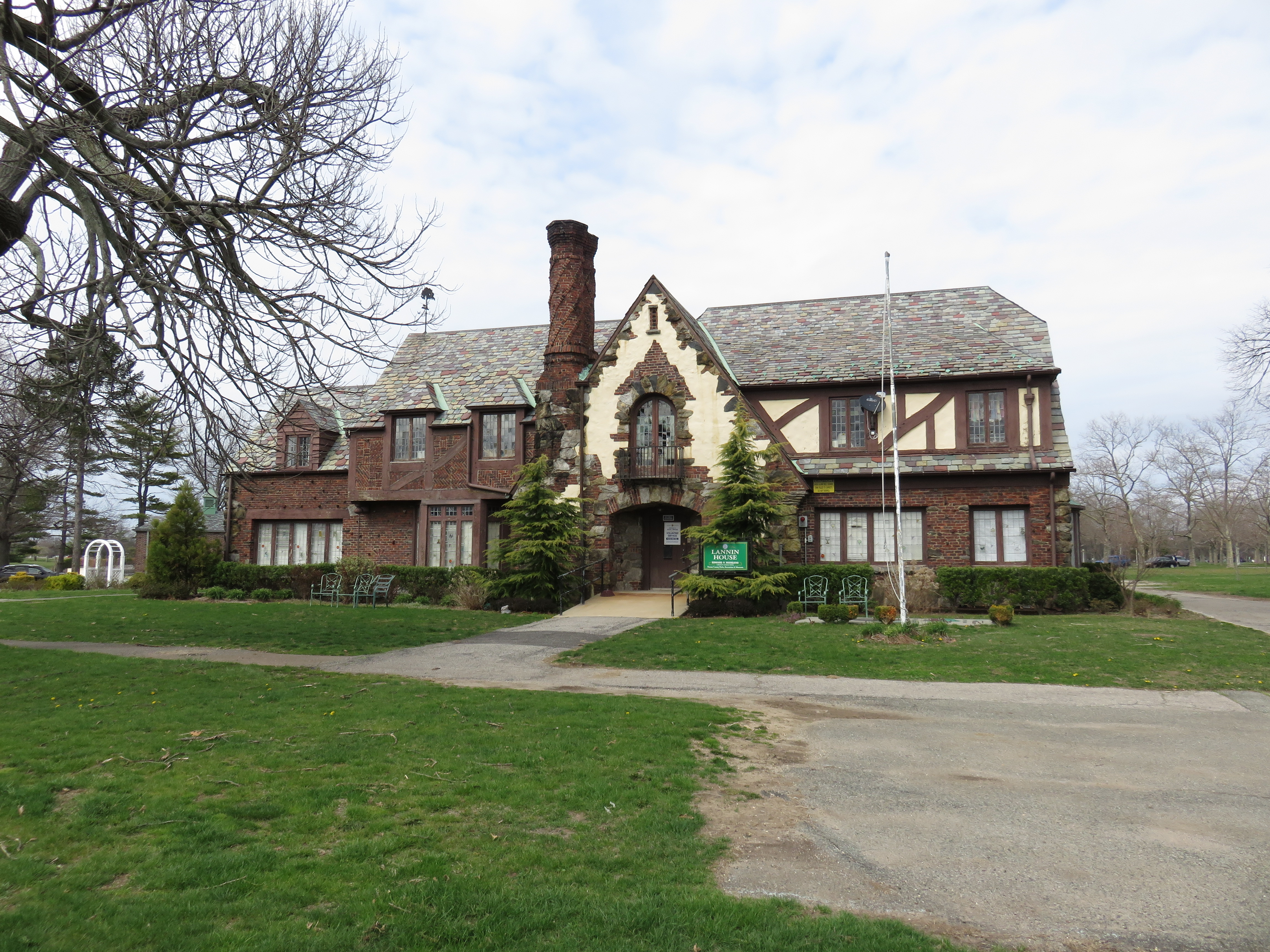
Lannin House, located within the park

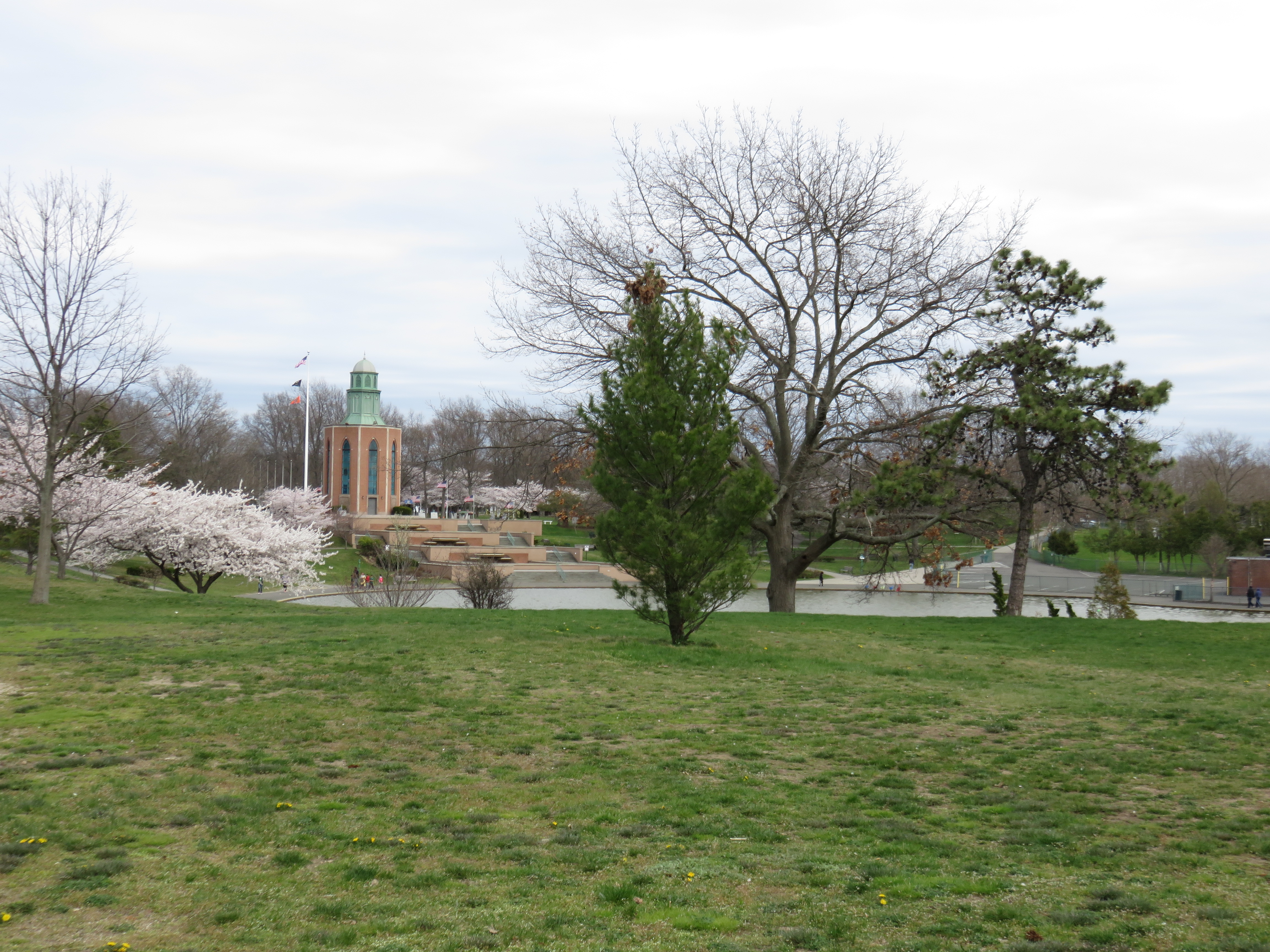
Eisenhower Park's Veterans Memorial

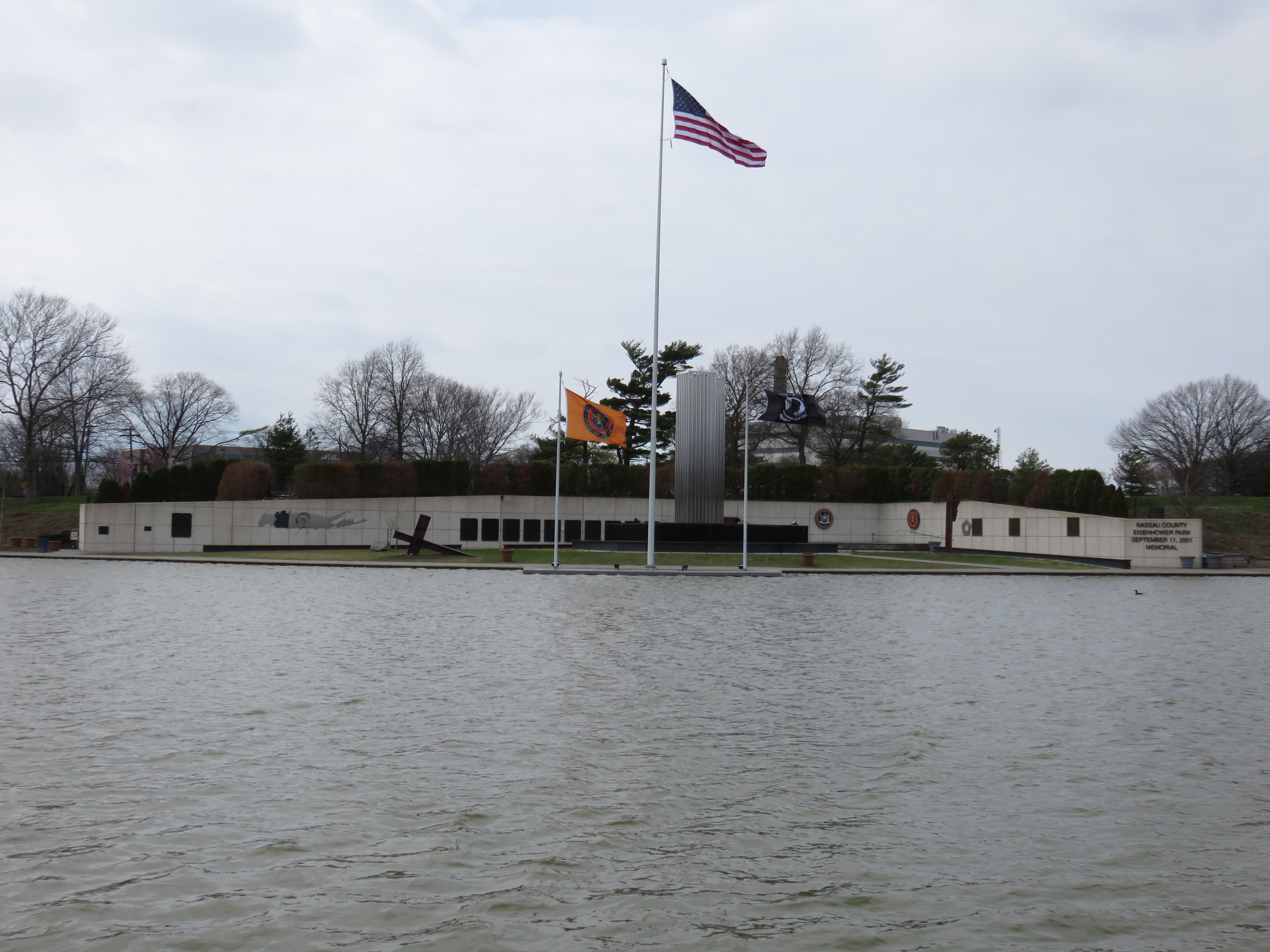
Eisenhower Park's 9/11 Memorial

Part of the county park system since 1944, what is now Eisenhower Park offers a full range of athletic and family activities, including some of the most extensive recreational facilities in Nassau County and an array of summertime events.

In the early part of the 20th century, the park was part of the private Salisbury Country Club and included five 18-hole golf courses. It hosted the ninth PGA Championship in 1926, then a match play competition. Walter Hagen defeated future two-time champion Leo Diegel 5 & 3 in the finals to win his third consecutive title, his fourth overall, and the eighth of his eleven major titles. The championship was conducted on the present-day Red Course.

Also located on the park's site today is "Lannin House," a Tudor style house constructed for Dorothy Lannin in 1928. The residence and its gardens, are still preserved today.

During the Great Depression, the club's owners were unable to pay taxes and the county took over the property. Subsequently, the county acquired additional land in the area. Salisbury Park was officially dedicated on October 1, 1949.

On October 13, 1969, Salisbury Park was rededicated as Dwight D. Eisenhower Memorial Park at a ceremony attended by the 34th President's grandson, Dwight D. Eisenhower II, and his wife, Julie Nixon Eisenhower. The elder Eisenhower had died several months earlier in March and would have turned age 79 on October 14.

On March 11, 2004, President George W. Bush visited Eisenhower Park for the groundbreaking of a new memorial for the victims of the September 11, 2001 attacks. This memorial was officially opened to the public on September 9, 2007. The two 30-foot (9 m), semi-transparent, stainless-steel towers, created to resemble those of the World Trade Center, stand amidst a fountain alongside the park's lake. On the lawn are two pieces of steel several feet long from the wreckage of the World Trade Center, surrounded by a colorful flower garden. A long stone wall bears the names of the 344 Nassau County residents who died September 11, 2001.

A statue of President Dwight D. Eisenhower was erected in the park in 2013.

Recent county capital projects in Eisenhower Park have included site infrastructure enhancements and memorial renovations, such as the 2026 groundbreakings for upgraded local emergency services and 9/11 tribute monuments.

== Activities in the park ==
=== Athletics ===
Eisenhower Park includes the following athletic facilities:

- Batting cage, with nine separate batting areas for varying pitching speeds
- 14 softball fields
- 3 baseball fields
- 3 football fields
- 4 soccer fields
- 16 lighted tennis courts
- A 50 m (55 yd) Aquatic Center swimming pool

=== Cricket ===
In September 2023, the International Cricket Council (ICC) announced that it would construct a temporary cricket stadium at Eisenhower Park to host matches during the 2024 ICC Men's T20 World Cup. The modular stadium was deconstructed following the conclusion of the tournament, with the grounds remaining intact as a legacy of the event.

=== Entertainment ===
==== Harry Chapin Lakeside Theatre ====
The Harry Chapin Lakeside Theatre is an outdoor theater that hosts a full schedule of entertainment events during the summer, from concerts to movies. The theater's name serves as a tribute to the late folk rock singer. Chapin was killed in a traffic collision en route to a free benefit concert in the park on July 16, 1981. That same year, a ceremony was held to around 5,500 people to commemorate the renaming of the theater.

==== Carltun on the Park ====
Carltun on the Park is a privately run restaurant operated in a former country club. The Carltun offers a restaurant, bar, banquet facilities, and a meeting room. The restaurant has played host to numerous events, including a fundraiser in 2004 for George W. Bush. The facility was renamed "The Lannin" in honor of baseball player Joseph Lannin, who created the Salisbury Country Club in 1917.

=== Golf ===
The park features three 18-hole golf courses open to the public: the Blue, Red, and White courses. The Red Course, originally part of the Salisbury Golf Club and designed in 1914 by Devereux Emmet, formerly hosted the annual Commerce Bank Championship on the Champions Tour, last held in 2008. It was also the site of the PGA Championship in 1926, won by Walter Hagen.

Located adjacent to the courses is a driving range with more than 100 stalls and night hours in season.

In addition to the regular courses, there are two lighted 18-hole miniature golf courses.

=== Swimming ===
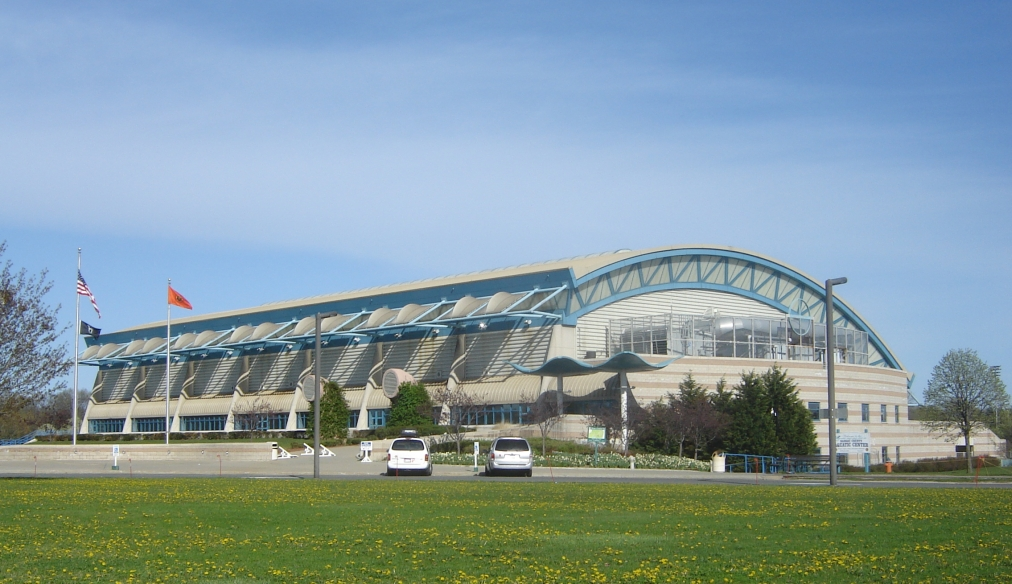
Aquatics Center at the park

The Nassau County Aquatic Center at Eisenhower Park is one of the finest swimming facilities in the U.S. Built in 1998 for the Goodwill Games, it currently hosts major swimming competitions and is open daily to the public.

Located within the center is a renovated Health Club that contains treadmills, arc trainers, stationary bikes, stair machines, free weights, and an assortment of Cybex weight machines.

=== Hockey ===
Northwell Health Ice Center has been the practice facility for the New York Islanders since 2016. It was formerly known as Twin Rinks when it opened in 2014.

== See also ==
- Bay Park (Bay Park, New York)
- Cantiague Park
- Christopher Morley Park
- Nassau County Museum of Art
- Wantagh Park
