= New York's 4th congressional district =

U.S. House district for New York

- Interactive map of district boundaries since January 3, 2025
- Representative: Laura Gillen; D–Rockville Centre
- Distribution: 99.97% urban; 0.03% rural
- Population (2025): 775,133
- Median household income: $142,494
- Ethnicity: 50.7% White; 22.1% Hispanic; 16.3% Black; 7.0% Asian; 2.7% Two or more races; 1.2% other
- Cook PVI: D+2

New York's 4th congressional district is a congressional district for the United States House of Representatives in central and southern Nassau County. It is represented by Democrat Laura Gillen.

NY-04 is the fourth-wealthiest congressional district in New York, and the 20th wealthiest nationally, with 29.1 percent of households earning over $200,000.

== Voter registration ==
Voter registration and party enrollment as of February 20, 2025
Party	Active voters	Inactive voters	Total voters	Percentage
Democratic	227,458	12,306	239,764	41.21%
Republican	161,504	7,875	169,379	29.11%
Conservative	5,099	292	5,391	0.93%
Working Families	1,468	62	1,530	0.26%
Other	13,700	861	14,561	2.50%
Unaffiliated	143,594	7,589	151,183	25.99%
Total	552,823	28,985	581,808	100%

== Counties, towns, and cities ==
For the 119th and successive Congresses (based on the districts drawn following the New York Court of Appeals' December 2023 decision in Hoffman v New York State Ind. Redistricting. Commn.), the district contains all or portions of the following counties, towns, and cities.

Nassau County (2)

Hempstead (part; also 3rd; includes Atlantic Beach, Baldwin, Barnum Island, Bay Park, Bellerose, Bellerose Terrace, Bellmore, Cedarhurst, East Atlantic Beach, East Rockaway, Elmont, Franklin Square, Freeport, Garden City South, Harbor Isle, Hempstead (village), Hewlett, Hewlett Bay Park, Hewlett Harbor, Hewlett Neck, Inwood, Island Park, Lakeview, Lawrence, Lido Beach, Lynbrook, Malverne, Malverne Park Oaks, Merrick, North Bellmore, North Lynbrook, North Merrick, North Valley Stream, North Wantagh, Oceanside, Point Lookout, Rockville Centre, Roosevelt, Seaford, South Floral Park, South Hempstead, South Valley Stream, Stewart Manor, Uniondale, Valley Stream, Wantagh, West Hempstead, Woodmere, Woodsburgh, and part of East Meadow, Floral Park, Garden City, Levittown, New Hyde Park, North New Hyde Park, and Salisbury), Long Beach

== Recent election results from statewide races ==
Year	Office	Results
2008	President	Obama 56–43%
2012	President	Obama 58–42%
2016	President	Clinton 54–42%
2016	Senate	Schumer 67–31%
2018	Senate	Gillibrand 62–38%
2018	Governor	Cuomo 60–39%
2018	Attorney General	James 59–40%
2020	President	Biden 57–42%
2022	Senate	Schumer 50–49%
2022	Governor	Zeldin 53–47%
2022	Attorney General	Henry 52–48%
2022	Comptroller	DiNapoli 51–49%
2024	President	Harris 50–49%
2024	Senate	Gillibrand 53–47%

== Historical district boundaries ==
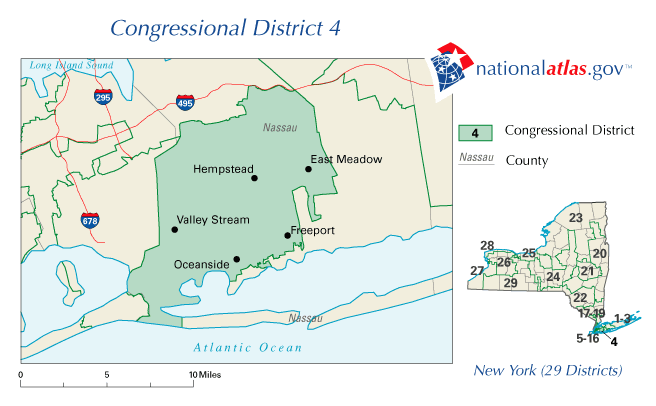
2003–2013

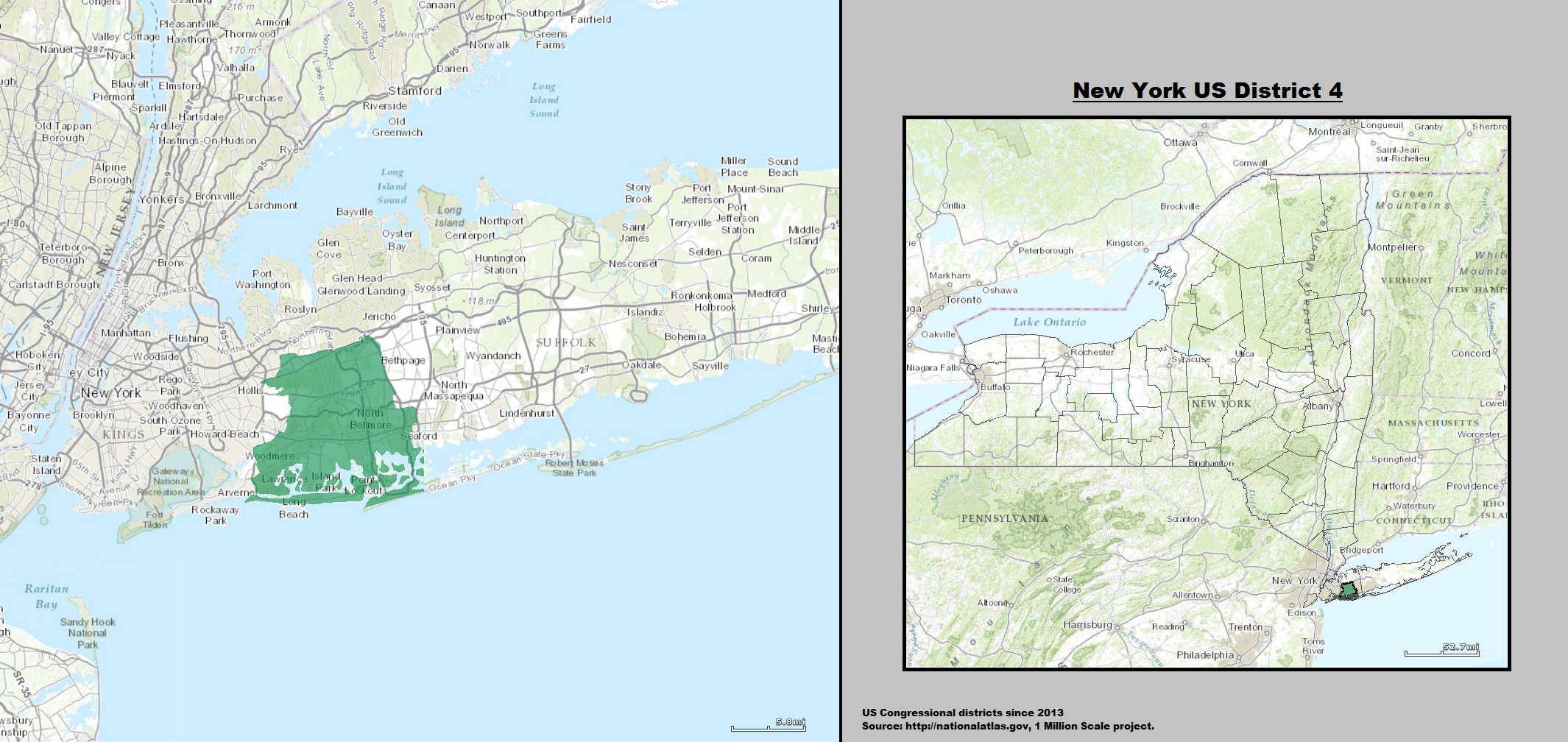
2013–2023

- 1789–1913:

Parts of Manhattan

- 1913–1945:

Parts of Brooklyn

- 1945–1963:

Parts of Queens

- 1963–present:

Parts of Nassau County

In the 1960s, 1970s and 1980s much of this area was in the 5th District. The 4th District then included many towns in eastern Nassau County now in the 3rd District.

== List of members representing the district ==
Representative	Party	Years	Cong ress	Electoral history	District location
District established March 4, 1789
John Hathorn (Warwick)	Anti-Administration	March 4, 1789 – March 3, 1791	1st	Elected in 1789. Lost re-election.	
Cornelius C. Schoonmaker (Shawangunk)	Anti-Administration	March 4, 1791 – March 3, 1793	2nd	Elected in 1790. Lost re-election.	
Peter Van Gaasbeck (Kingston)	Pro-Administration	March 4, 1793 – March 3, 1795	3rd	Elected in 1793. Retired.	
John Hathorn (Warwick)	Democratic-Republican	March 4, 1795 – March 3, 1797	4th	Elected in 1794. Retired.	
Lucas Elmendorf (Kingston)	Democratic-Republican	March 4, 1797 – March 3, 1803	5th 6th 7th	Elected in 1796. Re-elected in 1798. Re-elected in 1800. Retired.	
Philip Van Cortlandt (Croton)	Democratic-Republican	March 4, 1803 – March 3, 1809	8th 9th 10th	Redistricted from the 3rd district and re-elected in 1802. Re-elected in 1804. Re-elected in 1806. [data missing]	
James Emott (Albany)	Federalist	March 4, 1809 – March 3, 1813	11th 12th	Elected in 1808. Re-elected in 1810. [data missing]	
Thomas J. Oakley (Poughkeepsie)	Federalist	March 4, 1813 – March 3, 1815	13th	Elected in 1812. [data missing]	
Abraham H. Schenck (Fishkill Landing)	Democratic-Republican	March 4, 1815 – March 3, 1817	14th	Elected in 1814. [data missing]	
Vacant		March 4, 1817 – June 6, 1817	15th	Henry B. Lee was elected in 1816 but died September 16, 1816, before the term.	
James Tallmadge Jr. (Poughkeepsie)	Democratic-Republican	June 6, 1817 – March 3, 1819	15th	Elected to finish Lee's term and seated December 1, 1817.	
Randall S. Street (Poughkeepsie)	Federalist	March 4, 1819 – March 3, 1821	16th	Elected in 1818. [data missing]	
Vacant		March 4, 1821 – December 3, 1821	17th	Elections were held in April 1821. It is unclear when results were announced or credentials issued.	
William W. Van Wyck (Fishkill)	Democratic-Republican	December 3, 1821 – March 3, 1823	17th	Elected in 1821. Redistricted to the 5th district.	
Joel Frost (Carmel)	Democratic-Republican	March 4, 1823 – March 3, 1825	18th	Elected in 1822. Retired.	
Aaron Ward (Mount Pleasant)	Anti-Jacksonian	March 4, 1825 – March 3, 1829	19th 20th	Elected in 1824. Re-elected in 1826. Retired.	
Henry B. Cowles (Carmel)	Anti-Jacksonian	March 4, 1829 – March 3, 1831	21st	Elected in 1828. [data missing]	
Aaron Ward (Mount Pleasant)	Jacksonian	March 4, 1831 – March 3, 1837	22nd 23rd 24th	Elected in 1830. Re-elected in 1832. Re-elected in 1834. [data missing]	
Gouverneur Kemble (Cold Spring)	Democratic	March 4, 1837 – March 3, 1841	25th 26th	Elected in 1836. Re-elected in 1838. [data missing]	
Aaron Ward (Mount Pleasant)	Democratic	March 4, 1841 – March 3, 1843	27th	Elected in 1840. [data missing]	
William B. Maclay (New York)	Democratic	March 4, 1843 – March 3, 1849	28th 29th 30th	Elected in 1842. Re-elected in 1844. Re-elected in 1846. [data missing]	
Walter Underhill (New York)	Whig	March 4, 1849 – March 3, 1851	31st	Elected in 1848. [data missing]	
John Henry Hobart Haws (New York)	Whig	March 4, 1851 – March 3, 1853	32nd	Elected in 1850. [data missing]	
Michael Walsh (New York)	Democratic	March 4, 1853 – March 3, 1855	33rd	Elected in 1852. [data missing]	
John Kelly (New York)	Democratic	March 4, 1855 – December 25, 1858	34th 35th	Elected in 1854. Re-elected in 1856. Resigned.	
Vacant		December 25, 1858 – January 17, 1859	35th		
Thomas J. Barr (New York)	Independent Democrat	January 17, 1859 – March 3, 1861	35th 36th	Elected to finish Kelly's term. Re-elected in 1858. [data missing]	
James Kerrigan (New York)	Independent Democrat	March 4, 1861 – March 3, 1863	37th	Elected in 1860. [data missing]	
Benjamin Wood (New York)	Democratic	March 4, 1863 – March 3, 1865	38th	Redistricted from 3rd district and re-elected in 1862..	
Morgan Jones (New York)	Democratic	March 4, 1865 – March 3, 1867	39th	Elected in 1864. [data missing]	
John Fox (New York)	Democratic	March 4, 1867 – March 3, 1871	40th 41st	Elected in 1866. Re-elected in 1868. [data missing]	
Robert B. Roosevelt (New York)	Democratic	March 4, 1871 – March 3, 1873	42nd	Elected in 1870. [data missing]	
Philip S. Crooke (Flatbush)	Republican	March 4, 1873 – March 3, 1875	43rd	Elected in 1872. [data missing]	
Archibald M. Bliss (Brooklyn)	Democratic	March 4, 1875 – March 3, 1883	44th 45th 46th 47th	Elected in 1874. Re-elected in 1876. Re-elected in 1878. Re-elected in 1880. [data missing]	
Felix Campbell (Brooklyn)	Democratic	March 4, 1883 – March 3, 1885	48th	Elected in 1882. Redistricted to 2nd district	
Peter P. Mahoney (Brooklyn)	Democratic	March 4, 1885 – March 3, 1889	49th 50th	Elected in 1884. Re-elected in 1886. [data missing]	
John M. Clancy (Brooklyn)	Democratic	March 4, 1889 – March 3, 1893	51st 52nd	Elected in 1888. Re-elected in 1890. Redistricted to 2nd district	
William J. Coombs (Brooklyn)	Democratic	March 4, 1893 – March 3, 1895	53rd	Redistricted from 3rd district and re-elected in 1892.	
Israel F. Fischer (Brooklyn)	Republican	March 4, 1895 – March 3, 1899	54th 55th	Elected in 1894. Re-elected in 1896. [data missing]	
Bertram T. Clayton (Brooklyn)	Democratic	March 4, 1899 – March 3, 1901	56th	Elected in 1898. [data missing]	
Harry A. Hanbury (Brooklyn)	Republican	March 4, 1901 – March 3, 1903	57th	Elected in 1900. [data missing]	
Frank E. Wilson (Brooklyn)	Democratic	March 4, 1903 – March 3, 1905	58th	Redistricted from 5th district and re-elected in 1902.	
Charles B. Law (Brooklyn)	Republican	March 4, 1905 – March 3, 1911	59th 60th 61st	Elected in 1904. Re-elected in 1906. Re-elected in 1908. [data missing]	
Frank E. Wilson (Brooklyn)	Democratic	March 4, 1911 – March 3, 1913	62nd	Elected in 1910. Redistricted to 3rd district	
Harry H. Dale (Brooklyn)	Democratic	March 4, 1913 – January 6, 1919	63rd 64th 65th	Elected in 1912. Re-elected in 1914. Re-elected in 1916. Resigned to become judge of magistrate's court	
Vacant		January 6, 1919 – March 3, 1919	65th		
Thomas H. Cullen (Brooklyn)	Democratic	March 4, 1919 – March 1, 1944	66th 67th 68th 69th 70th 71st 72nd 73rd 74th 75th 76th 77th 78th	Elected in 1918. Re-elected in 1920. Re-elected in 1922. Re-elected in 1924. Re-elected in 1926. Re-elected in 1928. Re-elected in 1930. Re-elected in 1932. Re-elected in 1934. Re-elected in 1936. Re-elected in 1938. Re-elected in 1940. Re-elected in 1942. Died.	
Vacant		March 1, 1944 – June 6, 1944	78th		
John J. Rooney (Brooklyn)	Democratic	June 6, 1944 – January 3, 1945	78th	Elected to finish Cullen's term. Redistricted to 12th district	
William B. Barry (Queens)	Democratic	January 3, 1945 – October 20, 1946	79th	Redistricted from 2nd district and re-elected in 1944. Died.	
Vacant		October 21, 1946 – January 2, 1947	79th		
Gregory McMahon (Queens)	Republican	January 3, 1947 – January 3, 1949	80th	Elected in 1946. Lost re-election.	
L. Gary Clemente (Queens)	Democratic	January 3, 1949 – January 3, 1953	81st 82nd	Elected in 1948. Re-elected in 1950. Lost re-election.	
Henry J. Latham (Queens)	Republican	January 3, 1953 – December 31, 1958	83rd 84th 85th	Redistricted from 3rd district and re-elected in 1952. Re-elected in 1954. Re-elected in 1956. Resigned.	
Vacant		January 1, 1959 – January 2, 1959	85th		
Seymour Halpern (Queens)	Republican	January 3, 1959 – January 3, 1963	86th 87th	Elected in 1958. Re-elected in 1960. Redistricted to 6th district	
John W. Wydler (Garden City)	Republican	January 3, 1963 – January 3, 1973	88th 89th 90th 91st 92nd	Elected in 1962. Re-elected in 1964. Re-elected in 1966. Re-elected in 1968. Re-elected in 1970. Redistricted to 5th district	
Norman F. Lent (East Rockaway)	Republican	January 3, 1973 – January 3, 1993	93rd 94th 95th 96th 97th 98th 99th 100th 101st 102nd	Redistricted from 5th district and re-elected in 1972. Re-elected in 1974. Re-elected in 1976. Re-elected in 1978. Re-elected in 1980. Re-elected in 1982. Re-elected in 1984. Re-elected in 1986. Re-elected in 1988. Re-elected in 1990. Retired.	
David A. Levy (Baldwin)	Republican	January 3, 1993 – January 3, 1995	103rd	Elected in 1992. Lost renomination.	
Daniel Frisa (Westbury)	Republican	January 3, 1995 – January 3, 1997	104th	Elected in 1994. Lost re-election.	
Carolyn McCarthy (Mineola)	Democratic	January 3, 1997 – January 3, 2015	105th 106th 107th 108th 109th 110th 111th 112th 113th	Elected in 1996. Re-elected in 1998. Re-elected in 2000. Re-elected in 2002. Re-elected in 2004. Re-elected in 2006. Re-elected in 2008. Re-elected in 2010. Re-elected in 2012. Retired.	
Carolyn McCarthy (Mineola)	Democratic	January 3, 1997 – January 3, 2015	105th 106th 107th 108th 109th 110th 111th 112th 113th	Elected in 1996. Re-elected in 1998. Re-elected in 2000. Re-elected in 2002. Re-elected in 2004. Re-elected in 2006. Re-elected in 2008. Re-elected in 2010. Re-elected in 2012. Retired.	2003–2013; Parts of Nassau County
Carolyn McCarthy (Mineola)	Democratic	January 3, 1997 – January 3, 2015	105th 106th 107th 108th 109th 110th 111th 112th 113th	Elected in 1996. Re-elected in 1998. Re-elected in 2000. Re-elected in 2002. Re-elected in 2004. Re-elected in 2006. Re-elected in 2008. Re-elected in 2010. Re-elected in 2012. Retired.	2013–2023; Parts of Nassau County
Kathleen Rice (Garden City)	Democratic	January 3, 2015 – January 3, 2023	114th 115th 116th 117th	Elected in 2014. Re-elected in 2016. Re-elected in 2018. Re-elected in 2020. Retired.	2013–2023; Parts of Nassau County
Anthony D'Esposito (Island Park)	Republican	January 3, 2023 – January 3, 2025	118th	Elected in 2022. Lost re-election.	2023–2025; Parts of Nassau County
Laura Gillen (Rockville Centre)	Democratic	January 3, 2025 – present	119th	Elected in 2024. Re-elected in 2026.	2025–present Parts of Nassau County

== Election results ==
In New York electoral politics there are numerous smaller parties at various points on the political spectrum. Certain parties invariably endorse either the Republican or Democratic candidate for every office, hence the state electoral results contain both the party votes, and the final candidate votes (Listed as "Recap").

US House election, 1996: New York District 4
Party	Candidate	Votes	%	±%
Democratic	Carolyn McCarthy	127,060	57.5	
Republican	Daniel Frisa (incumbent)	89,542	40.5	
Right to Life	Vincent P. Garbitelli	3,252	1.5	
Liberal	Robert S. Berkowitz	1,162	0.5	
Majority		37,518	17.0	
Turnout		221,016	100	

US House election, 1998: New York District 4
Party	Candidate	Votes	%	±%
Democratic	Carolyn McCarthy (incumbent)	90,256	52.6	−4.9
Republican	Gregory R. Becker	79,984	46.6	+6.1
Liberal	Patricia M. Maher	1,343	0.8	+0.3
Majority		10,272	6.0	−11.0
Turnout		171,583	100	−22.4

US House election, 2000: New York District 4
Party	Candidate	Votes	%	±%
Democratic	Carolyn McCarthy (incumbent)	136,703	60.6	+8.0
Republican	Gregory R. Becker	87,830	38.9	−7.7
Liberal	Barbara Vitanza	1,222	0.5	−0.3
Majority		48,873	21.6	+15.6
Turnout		225,755	100	+31.6

US House election, 2002: New York District 4
Party	Candidate	Votes	%	±%
Democratic	Carolyn McCarthy (incumbent)	94,806	56.3	−4.3
Republican	Marilyn F. O'Grady	72,882	43.2	+4.3
Green	Tim Derham	852	0.5	+0.5
Majority		21,924	13.0	−8.6
Turnout		168,540	100	−25.3

US House election, 2004: New York District 4
Party	Candidate	Votes	%	±%
Democratic	Carolyn McCarthy (incumbent)	159,969	63.0	+6.7
Republican	James Garner	94,141	37.0	−6.2
Majority		65,828	25.9	+12.9
Turnout		254,110	100	+50.8

US House election, 2006: New York District 4
Party	Candidate	Votes	%	±%
Democratic	Carolyn McCarthy (incumbent)	101,861	64.9	+1.9
Republican	Martin W. Blessinger	55,050	35.1	−1.9
Majority		46,811	29.8	+3.9
Turnout		156,911	100	−38.3

US House election, 2008: New York District 4
Party	Candidate	Votes	%	±%
Democratic	Carolyn McCarthy (incumbent)	164,028	64.0	−0.9
Republican	Jack Martins	92,242	36.0	+0.9
Majority		71,786	28	−1.8
Turnout		256,270	100	+63.3

US House election, 2010: New York District 4
Party	Candidate	Votes	%	±%
Democratic	Carolyn McCarthy (incumbent)	94,483	53.6	−10.4
Republican	Fran Becker	81,718	46.4	+10.4
Majority		12,765	7.2	−20.8
Turnout		176,201	100	−31.2

US House election, 2012: New York District 4
Party	Candidate	Votes	%	±%
Democratic	Carolyn McCarthy (incumbent)	163,955	61.8	+8.2
Republican	Fran Becker	85,693	32.3	−14.1
Conservative	Frank Scaturro	15,603	5.9	+5.9
Majority		62,659	23.6	+16.4
Turnout		265,251	100	+50.5

US House election, 2014: New York District 4
Party	Candidate	Votes	%	±%
Democratic	Kathleen M. Rice	89,793	52.8	−9.0
Republican	Bruce Blakeman	80,127	47.2	+14.9

US House election, 2016: New York District 4
Party	Candidate	Votes	%	±%
Democratic	Kathleen Rice (incumbent)	185,286	59.5	+6.7
Republican	David Gurfein	125,865	40.5	−6.7

US House election, 2018: New York District 4
Party	Candidate	Votes	%	±%
Democratic	Kathleen Rice (incumbent)	159,535	61.0	+1.5
Republican	Ameer Benno	100,571	39.0	−1.5

US House election, 2020: New York District 4
Party	Candidate	Votes	%
Democratic	Kathleen Rice (incumbent)	199,762	56.1
Republican	Douglas Tuman	139,559	39.2
Conservative	Douglas Tuman	13,448	3.8
Total	Douglas Tuman	153,007	43.0
Green	Joseph R. Naham	3,024	0.9
Total votes		355,793	100.0
Democratic hold			

US House election, 2022: New York District 4
Party	Candidate	Votes	%
Republican	Anthony D'Esposito	129,353	47.65
Conservative	Anthony D'Esposito	11,269	4.15
Total	Anthony D'Esposito	140,622	51.8
Democratic	Laura Gillen	130,871	48.2
Total votes		271,493	100.0
Republican gain from Democratic			

US House election, 2024: New York District 4
Party	Candidate	Votes	%
Democratic	Laura Gillen	191,760	51.1
Republican	Anthony D'Esposito (incumbent)	183,157	48.9
Total votes		374,917	100.0
Democratic gain from Republican			

== See also ==
- List of United States congressional districts
- New York's congressional delegations
- New York's congressional districts
