= 1790 United States House of Representatives elections in New York =

United States House of Representatives elections in New York, 1790
- April 27–29, 1790

All 6 New York seats to the United States House of Representatives
	Majority party	Minority party
Party	Pro-Administration	Anti-Administration
Last election	3	3
Seats won	5	1
Seat change	▲2	▼2
Popular vote	6,263	4,435
Percentage	58.5%	41.5%

The 1790 United States House of Representatives elections in New York were held from April 27 to 29, 1790, to elect six U.S. Representatives to represent the State of New York in the United States House of Representatives.

== Background ==
The first U.S. Representatives under the United States Constitution had been elected in March 1789, and had taken their seats in the 1st United States Congress for a term ending on March 3, 1791. State elections in New York were at that time held during the last week of April, which meant that the State election preceding the beginning of the next congressional term was held more than ten months in advance, although the regular session of Congress was scheduled to convene only on the first Monday in December. Nevertheless, the New York politicians chose to have the seats filled, in case there might be a special session to convene at an earlier date.

== Congressional districts ==
On January 27, 1789, the New York State Legislature divided the State of New York into six congressional districts which were not numbered. The districts remained the same as for the previous elections in March 1789.

- One district (later back-numbered as the 1st) comprising Kings, Queens, Richmond and Suffolk counties.
- One district (later back-numbered as the 2nd) comprising New York City, and Westchester County except the towns of Salem, North Salem, Cortland, Yorktown and Stephentown.
- One district (later back-numbered as the 3rd) comprising Dutchess County and the abovementioned towns in Westchester.
- One district (later back-numbered as the 4th) comprising Orange and Ulster counties.
- One district (later back-numbered as the 5th) comprising Albany County east of the Hudson River, Columbia, Clinton and Washington counties.
- One district (later back-numbered as the 6th) comprising Albany County west of the Hudson River, and Montgomery and Ontario counties.

Note: There are now 62 counties in the State of New York. The counties which are not mentioned in this list had not yet been established, or sufficiently organized, the area being included in one or more of the abovementioned counties.

== Result ==
Five Federalists and one Anti-Federalist (later known as the Democratic-Republicans) were elected. The incumbents Laurance, Benson and Silvester were re-elected, the incumbents Floyd, Hathorn and Van Rensselaer were defeated.

1790 United States House election result
District	Federalist		Democratic-Republican		Federalist		Democratic-Republican		Democratic-Republican	
1	James Townsend	592	William Floyd	319	John Vanderbilt	327	Thomas Tredwell	284	Ezra L'Hommedieu	147
2	John Laurance	691	Melancton Smith	11						
3	Egbert Benson	723	Theodorus Bailey	467						
4	Peter Van Gaasbeck	753	Cornelius C. Schoonmaker	898			John Hathorn	61	Christopher Tappen	13
5	Peter Silvester	1,712	John Livingston	1,218						
6	James Gordon	1,465	Jeremiah Van Rensselaer	1,017						

Note: At this time political parties were still very new in the United States. Politicians aligned in two opposing groups: Those supporting the federal government and those opposing it. The first group are generally known as the Federalists, or (as a group in Congress) the "Pro-Administration Party." The second group at first were called the Anti-Federalists, or (as a group in Congress) the "Anti-Administration Party", but soon called themselves "Republicans." However, at the same time, the Federalists called them "Democrats" which was meant to be pejorative. After some time both terms got more and more confused, and sometimes used together as "Democratic Republicans" which later historians have adopted (with a hyphen) to describe the party from the beginning, to avoid confusion with both the later established and still existing Democratic and Republican parties.

== Special election ==
Representative-elect James Townsend died on May 24, 1790, just a month after his election, and well before the congressional term began. A special election to fill the vacancy was held at the time of the annual state election, from April 26 to 28, 1791, and was won by Anti-Federalist Thomas Tredwell. Thus four Federalists and two Anti-Federalists represented New York in the House of Representatives of the 2nd U.S. Congress.

1791 United States House special election result
District	Democratic-Republican		Federalist		Federalist		Democratic-Republican		Federalist		Democratic-Republican	
1	Thomas Tredwell	666	John Vanderbilt	489	Henry Peters	369	Ezra L'Hommedieu	361	Isaac Ledyard	301	Stephen Carman	360

== Aftermath ==
The House of Representatives of the 2nd United States Congress convened for its first session at Congress Hall in Philadelphia on October 24, 1791, and Gordon, Laurance, Silvester and Tredwell took their seats on this day. Benson took his seat on November 4; and Schoonmaker at some time between November 15, 1791, and January 30, 1792.

== Sources ==
- The New York Civil List compiled in 1858 (see: pg. 65 for district apportionment; pg. 68 for Congressmen)
- Members of the Second United States Congress
- Election result 1st D. at Tufts University Library project "A New Nation Votes"
- Election result 2nd D. at Tufts University Library project "A New Nation Votes"
- Election result 3rd D. at Tufts University Library project "A New Nation Votes"
- Election result 4th D. at Tufts University Library project "A New Nation Votes"
- Election result 5th D. at Tufts University Library project "A New Nation Votes"
- Election result 6th D. at Tufts University Library project "A New Nation Votes"
- Special election result 1st D. at Tufts University Library project "A New Nation Votes" (
