= List of former United States representatives (U) =

This is a complete list of former United States representatives whose last names begin with the letter U.

== Number of years and terms the member has served ==
The number of years the representative/delegate has served in Congress indicates the number of terms the representative/delegate has. Note the representative/delegate can also serve non-consecutive terms if the representative/delegate loses election and wins re-election to the House.

- 2 years - 1 or 2 terms
- 4 years - 2 or 3 terms
- 6 years - 3 or 4 terms
- 8 years - 4 or 5 terms
- 10 years - 5 or 6 terms
- 12 years - 6 or 7 terms
- 14 years - 7 or 8 terms
- 16 years - 8 or 9 terms
- 18 years - 9 or 10 terms
- 20 years - 10 or 11 terms
- 22 years - 11 or 12 terms
- 24 years - 12 or 13 terms
- 26 years - 13 or 14 terms
- 28 years - 14 or 15 terms
- 30 years - 15 or 16 terms
- 32 years - 16 or 17 terms
- 34 years - 17 or 18 terms
- 36 years - 18 or 19 terms
- 38 years - 19 or 20 terms
- 40 years - 20 or 21 terms
- 42 years - 21 or 22 terms
- 44 years - 22 or 23 terms
- 46 years - 23 or 24 terms
- 48 years - 24 or 25 terms
- 50 years - 25 or 26 terms
- 52 years - 26 or 27 terms
- 54 years - 27 or 28 terms
- 56 years - 28 or 29 terms
- 58 years - 29 or 30 terms

Name	Term	State/ Territory	Party	Lifespan
Mark Udall	1999–2009	Colorado	Democratic	1950–present
Mo Udall	1961–1991	Arizona	Democratic	1922–1998
Stewart Udall	1955–1961	Arizona	Democratic	1920–2010
Tom Udall	1999–2009	New Mexico	Democratic	1948–present
Daniel Udree	1813–1815; 1820–1821; 1822–1825	Pennsylvania	Democratic-Republican	1751–1828
Al Ullman	1957–1981	Oregon	Democratic	1914–1986
William B. Umstead	1933–1939	North Carolina	Democratic	1895–1954
Charles L. Underhill	1921–1933	Massachusetts	Republican	1867–1946
Edwin S. Underhill	1911–1915	New York	Democratic	1861–1929
John Q. Underhill	1899–1901	New York	Democratic	1848–1907
Walter Underhill	1849–1851	New York	Whig	1795–1866
John William Henderson Underwood	1859–1861	Georgia	Democratic	1816–1888
Joseph R. Underwood	1835–1843	Kentucky	Whig	1791–1876
Mell G. Underwood	1923–1936	Ohio	Democratic	1892–1972
Oscar Underwood	1895–1896; 1897–1915	Alabama	Democratic	1862–1929
Robert A. Underwood	1993–2003	Guam	Democratic	1948–present
Thomas R. Underwood	1949–1951	Kentucky	Democratic	1898–1956
Warner Underwood	1855–1859	Kentucky	American	1808–1872
Jolene Unsoeld	1989–1995	Washington	Democratic	1931–2021
Jonathan T. Updegraff	1879–1882	Ohio	Republican	1822–1882
Thomas Updegraff	1879–1883; 1893–1899	Iowa	Republican	1834–1910
Ralph E. Updike	1925–1929	Indiana	Republican	1894–1953
Charles Wentworth Upham	1853–1855	Massachusetts	Whig	1802–1875
George B. Upham	1801–1803	New Hampshire	Federalist	1768–1848
Jabez Upham	1807–1810	Massachusetts	Federalist	1764–1811
Nathaniel Upham	1817–1823	New Hampshire	Democratic-Republican	1774–1829
William David Upshaw	1919–1927	Georgia	Democratic	1866–1952
Charles Upson	1863–1869	Michigan	Republican	1821–1885
Christopher C. Upson	1879–1883	Texas	Democratic	1829–1902
William H. Upson	1869–1873	Ohio	Republican	1823–1910
Charles H. Upton	1861–1862	Virginia	Unionist	1812–1877
Fred Upton	1987–2023	Michigan	Republican	1953–present
Milton Urner	1879–1883	Maryland	Republican	1839–1926
James B. Utt	1953–1970	California	Republican	1899–1970
George H. Utter	1911–1912	Rhode Island	Republican	1854–1912
Hubert Utterback	1935–1937	Iowa	Democratic	1880–1942
John G. Utterback	1933–1935	Maine	Democratic	1872–1955
