= General John Hathorn Stone House =

Historic house in New York, United States

- Gen. John Hathorn Stone House
- U.S. National Register of Historic Places
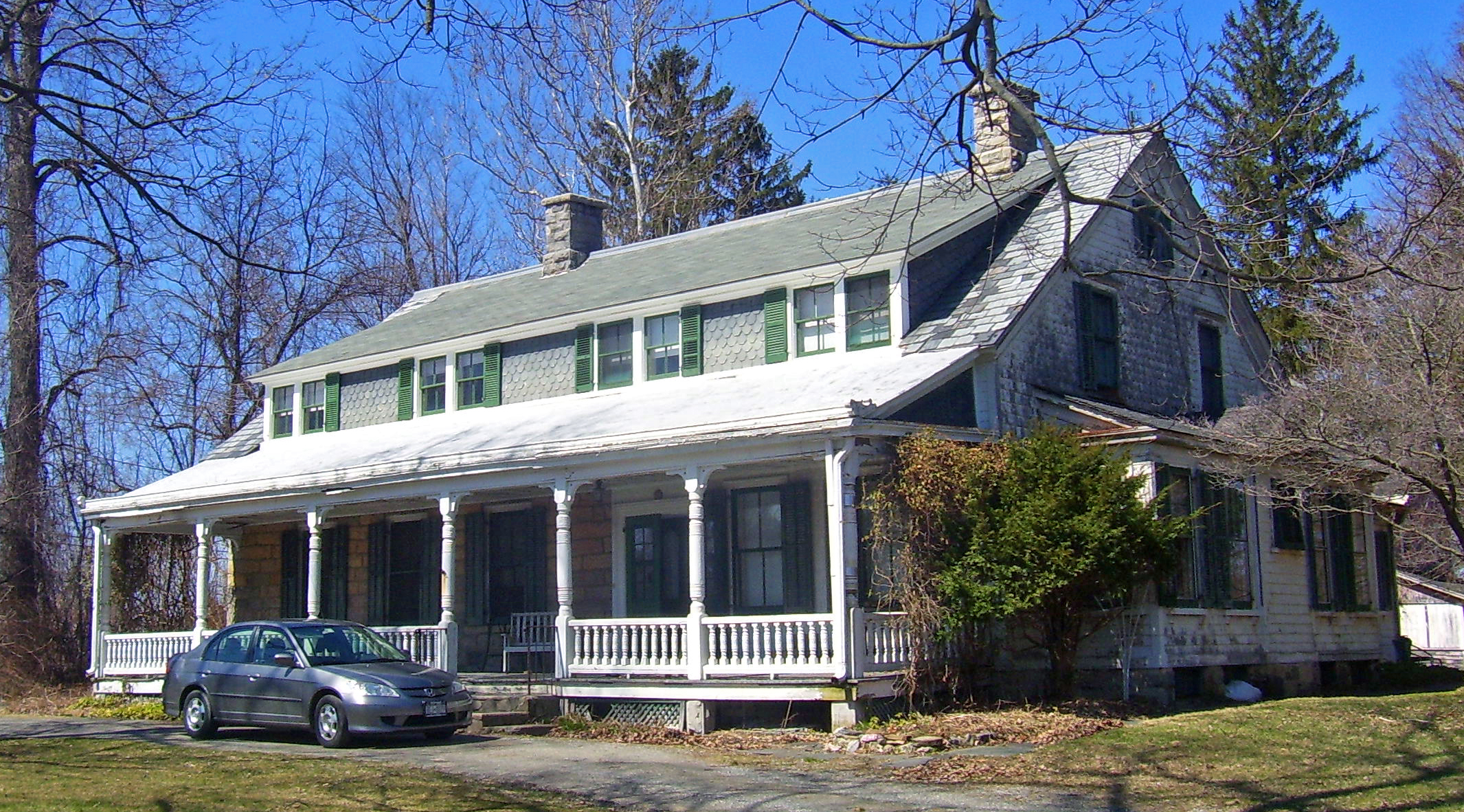
- Front elevation and east profile in 2008
- Location: Warwick, NY
- Nearest city: Middletown
- Coordinates: 41°14′43″N 74°22′14″W
- Area: 14 acres (5.6 ha)
- Built: 1773
- Architect: John Hathorn
- NRHP reference No.: 01000252
- Added to NRHP: 2001

The General John Hathorn Stone House is located on Hathorn Road in the town of Warwick, New York, United States, just off NY 94, a mile south of the village of Warwick. It was built by Hathorn in 1773 but expanded considerably in the mid-19th century.

It is on a 14-acre (5.6-ha) lot, the remainder of the original 300 acres (120 ha) Hathorn and his family farmed. In 2001, it and an early-19th-century outbuilding were listed on the National Register of Historic Places.

== Building ==
The six-bay 1 1/2-story house is built of coursed rubblestone and uncoursed ashlar. The foundation is stone and the roof is asphalt shingle. A wooden porch spans the front, with its roof continuing the line of the main roof. Low dormer windows line the second story. Two frame wings come out from the rear and side, Large letters set into the brick on the west gable spell out "E., I & H, 1773", a reference to Hathorn and his wife and the year of the house's construction.

Much of the interior retains furnishings from the Victorian era, when the house was extensively redone. Behind the house is a mid-19th-century Greek Revival building that has been used for several purposes during the course of its existence.

== History ==
As a young man Hathorn, a native of today's Delaware, had been on the surveying team that established the present land border between New York and New Jersey, which had been the subject of a lengthy conflict between the two colonies for much of the 18th century. He settled in Warwick and opened a store and iron forge in 1770, and built the house after marrying Elizabeth Welling, daughter of his local host, in 1772. The inscription of their initials and the year of construction in the side of the house is a tradition more commonly associated with Germanic building traditions, a sign of how influential settlers of that background were in the Hudson Valley.

During the Revolutionary War he rose from the rank of captain to colonel, and was promoted to major general afterwards. According to local lore, George Washington spent the night at Hathorn's house on two occasions. Hathorn commanded the local militia, entrusted with guarding the Ramapo approach to the Hudson Valley. He was one of the few survivors of their defeat by Joseph Brant at the Battle of Minisink Ford. The front of the house holds a niche where he hid for a week from an attempt on his life by local Loyalists and their Indian allies.

After the war he began a more successful political career, first in the New York State Assembly, where he rose to become speaker, then in the state senate and finally in the House of Representatives in the early 19th century. Upon his death in 1825 his family kept the house for nine more years, then sold it to the Sanford family, who combined it with the lot holding the neighboring Jeremiah Morehouse House. They added the rear building, the wings and the porch in addition to doubling the house's original size. In 1923 they sold it to another family, and it has passed through several owners since then. Hathorn's descendents have held reunions at the house in 1923 and 2000.

Today, a former section of Route 94 is named for Hathorn. A nearby restaurant is also known as Chateau Hathorn.

As of March 2009, a Permaculture practice and education initiative has been implemented on the site. Using the 9 acres (36,000 m^{2}) across the street from the Hathorn Stone House, Hathorn Farm has created a "beyond organic" garden that maximizes rainwater and grows only heirloom and organic produce. Hathorn Farm also offers a 72-hour Permaculture Design Certification course.
