= 1789 United States House of Representatives elections in New York =

United States House of Representatives elections in New York, 1789
- March 3–4, 1789

All 6 New York seats to the United States House of Representatives
	First party	Second party
Party	Pro-Administration	Anti-Administration
Seats won	3	3
Popular vote	5,845	4,880
Percentage	54.5%	45.5%

The 1789 United States House of Representatives elections in New York were held on March 3 and 4, 1789, to elect 6 U.S. Representatives to represent the State of New York in the 1st United States Congress.

== Background ==
The United States Constitution was adopted on September 17, 1787, by the Constitutional Convention in Philadelphia, and then ratified by the States. On July 8, 1788, the Congress of the Confederation passed a resolution calling the first session of the 1st United States Congress for March 4, 1789, to convene at New York City and the election of U.S. Senators and U.S. Representatives in the meanwhile by the States. New York ratified the U.S. Constitution on July 26, 1788, by a very slim margin.

== Congressional districts ==
On January 27, 1789, the New York State Legislature divided the State of New York into six congressional districts which were not numbered.

- One district (later back-numbered as the 1st) comprising Kings, Queens, Richmond and Suffolk counties.
- One district (later back-numbered as the 2nd) comprising New York City, and Westchester County except the towns of Salem, North Salem, Cortland, Yorktown and Stephentown.
- One district (later back-numbered as the 3rd) comprising Dutchess County and the abovementioned towns in Westchester.
- One district (later back-numbered as the 4th) comprising Orange and Ulster counties.
- One district (later back-numbered as the 5th) comprising Albany County east of the Hudson River, Columbia, Clinton and Washington counties.
- One district (later back-numbered as the 6th) comprising Albany County west of the Hudson River, and Montgomery and Ontario counties.

Note: There are now 62 counties in the State of New York. The counties which are not mentioned in this list had not yet been established, or sufficiently organized, the area being included in one or more of the abovementioned counties.

== Result ==
Three Federalists and three Anti-Federalists (later known as the Democratic-Republicans) were elected.

1789 United States House election result
District	Democratic-Republican		Federalist		Democratic-Republican	
1	William Floyd	894				
2	John Broome	372	John Laurance	2,418	Philip Pell	33
3	Theodorus Bailey	574	Egbert Benson	584		
4	John Hathorn					
5	Matthew Adgate	1,501	Peter Silvester	1,628	John Williams	50
6	Jeremiah Van Rensselaer	1,456	Abraham Ten Broeck	1,215		

Note: This was the first time political parties appeared in the United States. Before the question of establishing a federal government, or not, arose, all candidatures had been personal. Now, politicians aligned in two opposing groups: First those in favor of the establishment of a federal government and those against it, and then - after the federal government had been indeed established - those who supported it and those who did not. The first group are generally known as the Federalists, or (as a group in Congress) the "Pro-Administration Party." The second group at first were called the Anti-Federalists, or (as a group in Congress) the "Anti-Administration Party", but soon called themselves "Republicans." However, at the same time, the Federalists called them "Democrats" which was meant to be pejorative. After some time both terms got more and more confused, and sometimes used together as "Democratic Republicans" which later historians have adopted (with a hyphen) to describe the party from the beginning, to avoid confusion with both the later established and still existing Democratic and Republican parties.

== Aftermath ==
The 1st United States Congress had convened at Federal Hall in New York City on March 4, 1789, without any members from the State of New York, and without a quorum in either Senate or House. The first day with a quorum in the House was April 1. The representatives elected in and near New York City took their seats soon after the election. The upstate representatives needed some time to arrive, and Peter Silvester took his seat on April 22, John Hathorn on April 23, and Jeremiah Van Rensselaer on May 9. Their term ended on March 3, 1791. In April 1790, all six representatives ran for re-election: Floyd, Hathorn and Van Rensselaer (all Dem.-Rep.) were defeated; Laurance, Benson and Silvester (all Fed.) were re-elected.

== See also ==
- United States House of Representatives elections, 1788 and 1789

== Sources ==
- The New York Civil List compiled in 1858 (see: pg. 65 for district apportionment; pg. 68 for Congressmen)
- Members of the First United States Congress
- The Documentary History of the First Federal Election 1788-1790 (page XXVI)
- Election result 1st D. at Tufts University Library project "A New Nation Votes"
- Election result 2nd D. at Tufts University Library project "A New Nation Votes"
- Election result 3rd D. at Tufts University Library project "A New Nation Votes"
- Election result 4th D. at Tufts University Library project "A New Nation Votes"
- Election result 5th D. at Tufts University Library project "A New Nation Votes"
- Election result 6th D. at Tufts University Library project "A New Nation Votes"
