= William Wall (New York politician) =

American politician and businessman

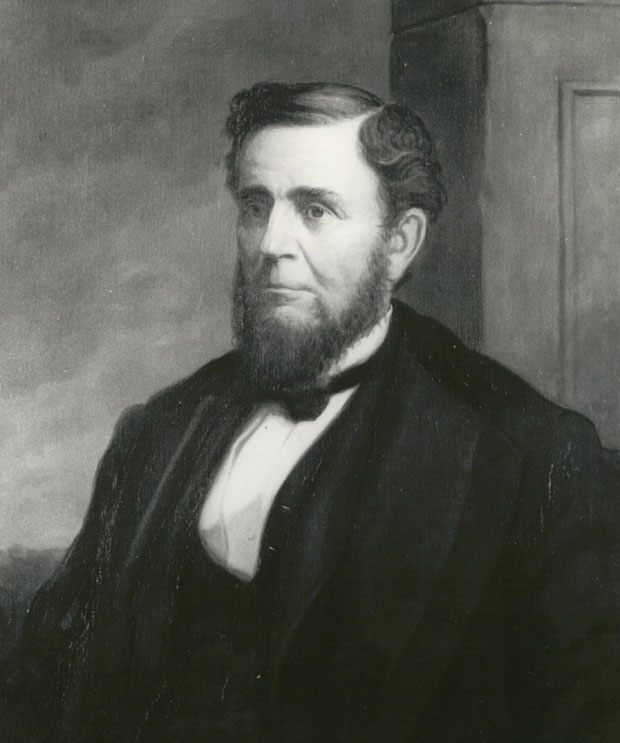
- William Wall, Congressman from New York

Member of the U.S. House of Representatives from New York's 5th district
- In office March 4, 1861 – March 3, 1863
- Preceded by: William B. Maclay
- Succeeded by: Fernando Wood

Personal details
- Born: March 20, 1800 Philadelphia, Pennsylvania, U.S.
- Died: April 20, 1872 (aged 72) Brooklyn, New York, U.S.
- Resting place: Green-Wood Cemetery, Kings County, New York, U.S.
- Party: Republican
- Other political affiliations: Whig
- Occupation: Businessman, cordage manufacturer

William Wall (March 20, 1800 – April 20, 1872) was an American businessman, banker, and politician who served one term as a U.S. representative from New York during the American Civil War.

== Biography ==
Born in Philadelphia, Pennsylvania, Wall received a limited schooling. He was trained as a rope maker by his brother in law and worked as a journeyman. In 1822 Wall moved to Williamsburg, now part of Brooklyn, New York, where he established himself as a cordage manufacturer.

=== Early political career ===
Wall became a Whig and served in village offices in Williamsburg, including trustee, commissioner of highways, member of the board of finance, and commissioner of waterworks. He served as mayor in 1853 and was one of the leaders of the successful movement for Williamsburg to merge with Brooklyn.

=== Business career ===
He was one of the incorporators of the Williamsburg Savings Bank and served as its president. Wall was also one of the founders of the Williamsburg City Bank (later the First National Bank) and the Williamsburg Dispensary.

=== Congress ===
Wall was elected as a Republican to the Thirty-seventh Congress and served one term, March 4, 1861 – March 3, 1863. He declined to be a candidate for renomination in 1862.

=== Later career and death ===
During the war Wall was consulted by Abraham Lincoln and members of the Lincoln administration concerning operation of the Brooklyn Navy Yard; they also sought his advice on financial issues pertinent to the wartime operation of the federal government.

He served as delegate to the National Union Convention in 1866.

Wall died in Brooklyn on April 20, 1872, and was interred in Green-Wood Cemetery, Section 56, Lot 9802.

=== Legacy ===
His rope making company remained in business under the management of his sons, and in 1930 celebrated its 100th anniversary.

The Honorable William Wall is the floating clubhouse of the Manhattan Sailing Club, and was named in his honor.

U.S. House of Representatives
Preceded by William B. Maclay	Member of the U.S. House of Representatives from New York's 5th congressional district 1861–1863	Succeeded by Fernando Wood
