= L. Gary Clemente =

American politician (1908–1968)

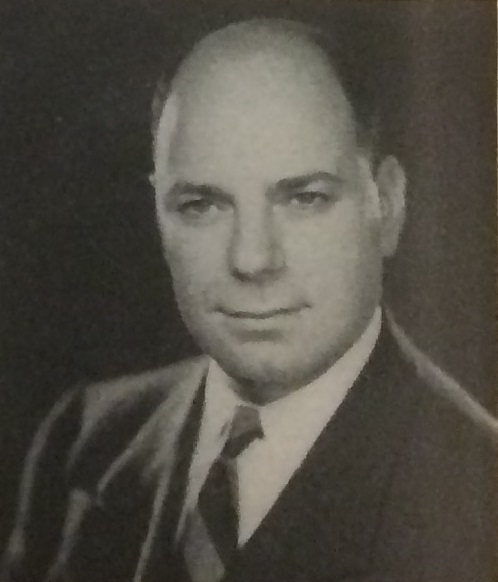

Member of the U.S. House of Representatives from New York's 4th district
- In office January 3, 1949 – January 3, 1953
- Preceded by: Gregory McMahon
- Succeeded by: Henry J. Latham

Member of the New York City Council
- In office 1946–1949

Personal details
- Born: Louis Gary Clemente; June 10, 1908 New York City, U.S.
- Died: May 13, 1968 (aged 59) New York City, U.S.
- Party: Democratic
- Education: Georgetown Law School

Military service
- Allegiance: United States
- Branch/service: United States Army
- Years of service: 1941–1946
- Rank: Lieutenant colonel

Louis Gary Clemente (June 13, 1908 – May 13, 1968) was an American lawyer and politician who served two terms as a United States representative from New York from 1949 to 1953.

== Biography ==
Born in New York City, he attended St. Ann's Academy in Manhattan and LaSalle Military Academy in Oakdale. He received a Reserve officer's certificate at Plattsburgh in 1925 and a Reserve commission in 1929.

In 1931 he graduated from Georgetown Law School, and was admitted to the District of Columbia bar. Clemente practiced in Washington, D.C., and in New York.

=== Military service ===
Clemente entered the United States Army as a second lieutenant in 1941 and served until released from active duty as a lieutenant colonel in 1946. He was a member of the New York City Council from 1946 to 1949.

=== Tenure in Congress ===
He was elected as a Democrat to the Eighty-first and Eighty-second Congresses, holding office from January 3, 1949, to January 3, 1953. He was an unsuccessful candidate for reelection in 1952 to the Eighty-third Congress.

=== Later career and death ===
After leaving Congress Clemente was executive vice president of Unexcelled Chemical Corp., Ohio Bronze Corp., Premier Chemical Corp., and Modene Paint Corp.

He died in Jamaica, New York; interment was in St. John's Cemetery, Flushing.

U.S. House of Representatives
Preceded by Gregory McMahon	Member of the U.S. House of Representatives from New York's 4th congressional district 1949–1953	Succeeded by Henry J. Latham
