= Jeremiah Morehouse House =

Historic house in New York, United States

- U.S. National Register of Historic Places
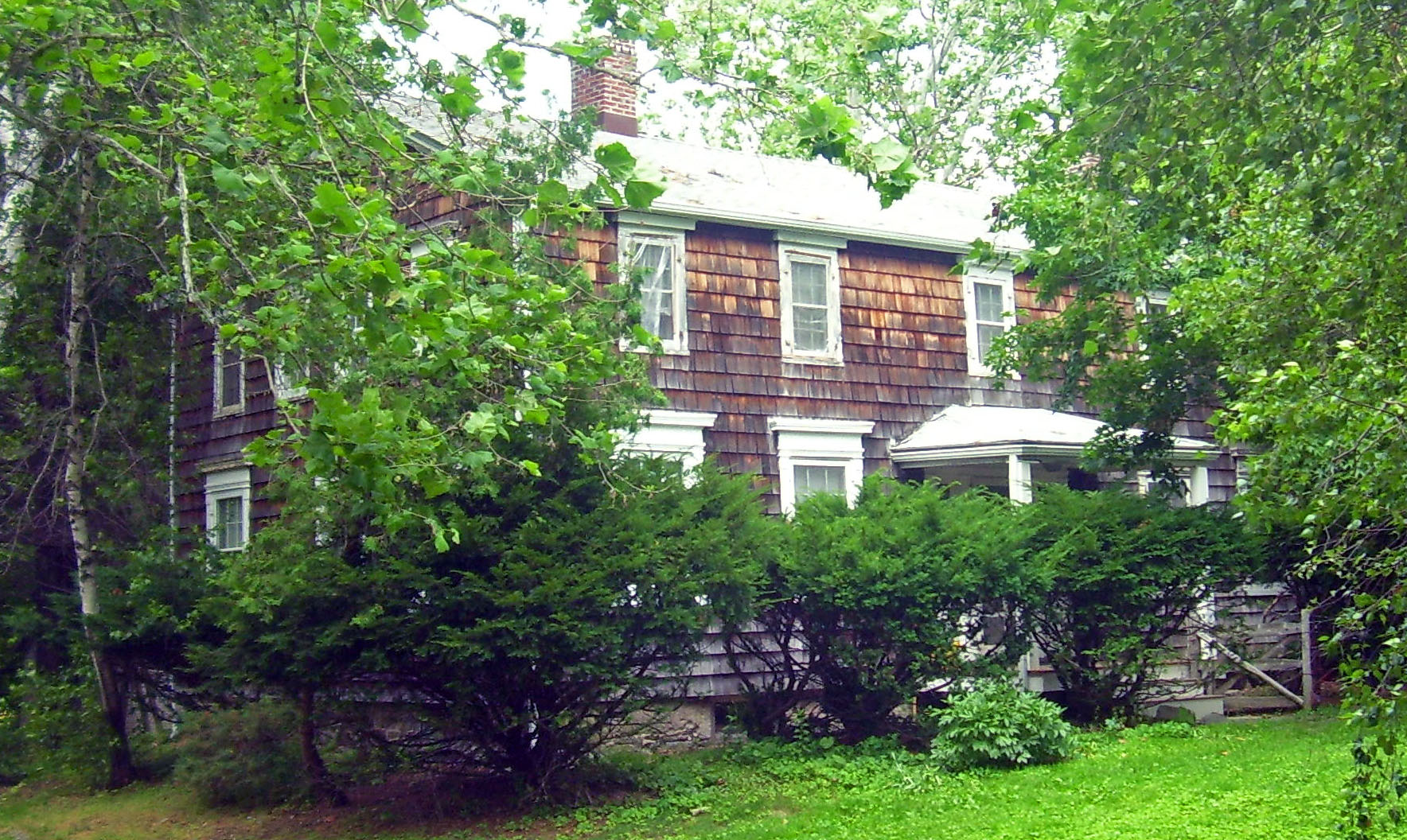
- East (front) elevation, 2008

- Location within New York Location within the United States
- Location: Warwick, NY
- Nearest city: Middletown
- Coordinates: 41°14′44″N 74°22′06″W
- Area: 9 acres (3.6 ha)
- Built: 1767
- NRHP reference No.: 06000259
- Added to NRHP: April 12, 2006

The Jeremiah Morehouse House is located on Hathorn Road in Warwick, New York, United States, just off NY 94. It is a wooden house that was listed on the National Register of Historic Places in 2006.

It is on a 9-acre (3.6 ha) lot adjacent to the General John Hathorn Stone House, also listed on the Register. The house was originally built in 1767 by Abijah Morehouse, an early settler of the Warwick region who had arrived from Connecticut, and parts of it reflect English building traditions more common there. His descendants, particularly his son Jeremiah, extensively renovated it in the early 19th century, adding elements of that era's dominant Greek Revival style.

== House and property ==
The house sits amid trees and shrubbery facing Hathorn Road, the former alignment of Route 94 and a largely unaltered section of the former Kings' Highway, 94's predecessor from the colonial era. It is on the northern of two parcels on the total property bisected by the road. There are several outbuildings, most of them considered contributing resources to the historic character of the property.

It is five bays wide and two stories tall, on a fieldstone and mortar foundation. The gabled roof has a medium pitch. Siding is wood shake with some original corner boards remaining. The roof is shingled in asphalt, with two brick chimneys rising from the center. There is a small shed-roofed bump-out on the northern side. The windows are all flanked by pilasters and crowned with fully decorated entablatures.

The interior is built on a center-hall plan and has a fully excavated basement. Most of the finishes and some of the wood trim dates to the mid-19th century. Some furnishings, such as the five-paneled wooden door that leads from the center to one of the older sections, date to the house's earliest years.

There are a few other buildings and objects on the property that are of sufficient age to add to its historic character. A small wood frame shed with gabled metal-seam roof in the rear dates to the late 19th century. In front of the house are an iron hitching post and a millstone used as a carriage step; these too are contributing. A detached frame garage is of unknown date but is probably recent; it is the only non-contributing resource on the property.

Across the road, the stone wall is included in the listing, as is the large wooden dairy barn with a collapsed roof. Next to it is a smaller, L-shaped building probably used as a chicken coop and granary. Another smaller barn with cupola in a late Victorian style was probably used for keeping horses.

== History ==
Adonijah Morehouse came to the Warwick area from Ridgefield, Connecticut around 1764, drawn like many others from New England by reports of unsettled land and fertile fields. He bought the land in 1767 and married Sarah Brower the next year. The house as originally built was probably close to the English models seen in Connecticut at the time; however it was likely only one and a half stories in height rather than the two more typical of English vernacular homes. This is more typical of homes in the Hudson Valley, where homebuilding was as influenced by Dutch and German traditions as English.

Census and property tax records for the remainder of the 18th century do not list Jeremiah or his mother as the owner. This is probably because they left the house at that time to go live with her second husband in the nearby hamlet of Bellvale. By 1800 he is listed as the head of the house, and so it remained through the 1830 census.

In the 1840s, the family expanded the house. They added to the house's west side and giving it its current footprint. They also extensively remodeled the interior, and the trim from this era shows the influence of the then-popular Greek Revival. Most notable in this regard is the chinoiserie-inspired staircase. The structural framing was also revised to include some lighter, milled woods to supplement the heavy-hewn beams the house had originally been built with.

Twenty years later, George Morehouse expanded the house again. This time they raised it to two full stories and added a boxed cornice with hidden "Yankee" gutter. Both small rear porches were added at this time, suggesting the influence of the Picturesque as visualized by Andrew Jackson Downing.

The house was sold in 1871 to local dairy farmer Pierson Ezra Sanford, who combined both it and the Hathorn property next door into one lot. The barn across the street, and many of the other outbuildings, were likely built around this time to support the farming operations.

In the 20th century, the house and property passed to other owners. One of them removed the box cornice and replaced Yankee gutters with standard gutters; the seam-metal roof was also shingled. The current owner put the shakes over the original clapboard.
