= John Henry Hobart Haws =

American politician

John Henry Hobart Haws (1809 – January 27, 1858) was a United States representative from New York. Born in New York City in 1809, he graduated from Columbia College of Columbia University in 1827; he studied law, was admitted to the bar and practiced in New York City.

Haws was elected as a Whig to the Thirty-second Congress, holding office from March 4, 1851, to March 3, 1853; he was unsuccessful for reelection in 1852. Haws died in New York City in 1858; original interment was in St. Stephen's Cemetery and reinterment was in Green-Wood Cemetery, Brooklyn, in 1866.

U.S. House of Representatives
Preceded by Walter Underhill	Member of the U.S. House of Representatives from New York's 4th congressional district March 4, 1851 – March 3, 1853	Succeeded by Michael Walsh
