= Gregory McMahon =

American politician

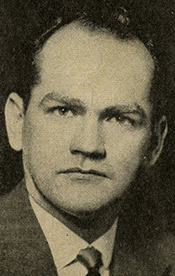

Member of the U.S. House of Representatives from New York's 4th district
- In office January 3, 1947 – January 3, 1949
- Preceded by: William Bernard Barry
- Succeeded by: L. Gary Clemente

Personal details
- Born: March 19, 1915 New York City, U.S.
- Died: June 27, 1989 (aged 74) Long Island, New York, U.S.
- Party: Republican
- Education: St. John's University; St. John's University School of Law
- Profession: Politician, accountant, tax consultant

Military service
- Allegiance: United States
- Branch/service: United States Navy
- Years of service: 1941–1945
- Rank: Ensign

Gregory McMahon (March 19, 1915 – June 27, 1989) was a United States representative from New York. Born in New York City, he attended a parochial school and was graduated from St. John's Prep School (Brooklyn) in 1933 and from St. John's University in 1938. He also attended St. John's Law School from 1939 to 1941 and was a certified public accountant since 1939. He taught at St. John's College from 1939 to 1942 and served in the United States Navy as an ensign from December 1941 to October 1945, serving in the Pacific.

McMahon was elected as a Republican to the Eightieth Congress, defeating Emily Barry, a last-minute fill-in for her incumbent husband, who had died two weeks before the election. McMahon held office from January 3, 1947 to January 3, 1949. He was an unsuccessful candidate for reelection in 1948 to the Eighty-first Congress. In 1950 McMahon was again the Republican nominee, losing to the incumbent. McMahon was an accountant and tax consultant. He was a resident of Garden City until his death in 1989.

U.S. House of Representatives
Preceded by William B. Barry	Member of the U.S. House of Representatives from New York's 4th congressional district 1947–1949	Succeeded by L. Gary Clemente
