= Henry B. Cowles =

American politician (1798–1873)

Member of the U.S. House of Representatives from New York's 4th district
- In office March 4, 1829 – March 3, 1831
- Preceded by: Aaron Ward
- Succeeded by: Aaron Ward

New York State Assembly
- In office 1826–1828

Personal details
- Born: March 18, 1798 Hartford, Connecticut, US
- Died: May 17, 1873 (aged 75) New York City, US
- Party: Anti-Jacksonian
- Education: Union College

Henry Booth Cowles (March 18, 1798 – May 17, 1873) was a U.S. representative from New York.

Born in Hartford, Connecticut, Cowles moved with his father to Dutchess County, New York, in 1809. He graduated from Union College, Schenectady, New York, in 1816. He studied law. He was admitted to the bar and commenced practice in Putnam County. He served as a member of the State assembly from 1826 to 1828.

Cowles was elected as an Anti-Jacksonian to the Twenty-first Congress (March 4, 1829 – March 3, 1831). He moved to New York City in 1834 and practiced law until his death there on May 17, 1873. He was interred in Rhinebeck Cemetery, Rhinebeck, New York.

U.S. House of Representatives
Preceded by Aaron Ward	Member of the U.S. House of Representatives from New York's 4th congressional district 1829–1831	Succeeded by Aaron Ward
