= William F. Brunner =

American politician (1887–1965)

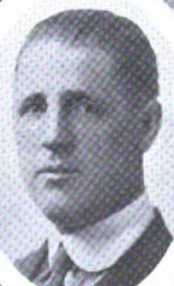

Member of the U.S. House of Representatives from New York's 2nd district
- In office March 4, 1929 – September 27, 1935
- Preceded by: John J. Kindred
- Succeeded by: William Bernard Barry

15th President of the New York City Board of Aldermen
- In office January 1, 1937 – December 31, 1937
- Preceded by: Timothy J. Sullivan
- Succeeded by: Newbold Morris (as president of the City Council)

Sheriff of Queens County
- In office 1935–1936

Member of the New York State Assembly from the 5th Queens County district
- In office January 1, 1922 – December 31, 1928
- Preceded by: Ralph Halpern
- Succeeded by: Maurice A. FitzGerald

Personal details
- Born: September 15, 1887 Woodhaven, Queens, New York, US
- Died: April 23, 1965 (aged 77) Far Rockaway, Queens, New York, US
- Party: Democratic
- Occupation: real estate, insurance

Military service
- Allegiance: United States
- Branch/service: United States Navy
- Years of service: 1917-1919
- Rank: Yeoman First Class

William Frank Brunner (September 15, 1887 – April 23, 1965) was an American businessman and politician who four terms served as a member of the U.S. House of Representatives from New York from 1929 to 1935.

== Early life ==
Born in Woodhaven, Queens, he attended the public schools, Far Rockaway High School in Far Rockaway, Queens, and Packard Commercial School in New York City. He moved to Rockaway Park, Queens in 1901, engaged in the insurance and real-estate business, and served in the United States Navy as a yeoman first class from 1917 to 1919.

== Political career ==
He was a member of the New York State Assembly (Queens Co., 5th D.) in 1922, 1923, 1924, 1925, 1926, 1927 and 1928.

=== Congress ===
He was elected as a Democrat to the Seventy-first and to the three succeeding Congresses, holding office from March 4, 1929, until his resignation on September 27, 1935, having been elected sheriff of Queens County. He served as sheriff from 1935 until his resignation in 1936 and was president of the Board of Aldermen of New York City from January 1 to December 31, 1937.

== Later career and death ==
Brunner resumed the insurance and real-estate business and was Queens County commissioner of borough works from July 1 to December 31, 1941. He was an unsuccessful candidate for the Democratic nomination in 1942 and for election on the American Labor Party ticket to the Seventy-eighth Congress. He was president of Rockaway Beach Hospital (later named Peninsula General Hospital, then Peninsula Hospital Center) from 1946 to 1965. He died in Far Rockaway on April 23, 1965. Interment was in St. John's Cemetery, Middle Village.

New York State Assembly
| Preceded by Ralph Halpern | New York State Assembly; Queens County 5th District; 1922-1928 | Succeeded by Maurice A. FitzGerald |
U.S. House of Representatives
| Preceded by John J. Kindred | Member of the U.S. House of Representatives from New York's 2nd congressional district 1929–1935 | Succeeded by William B. Barry |
