= William Bernard Barry =

American politician

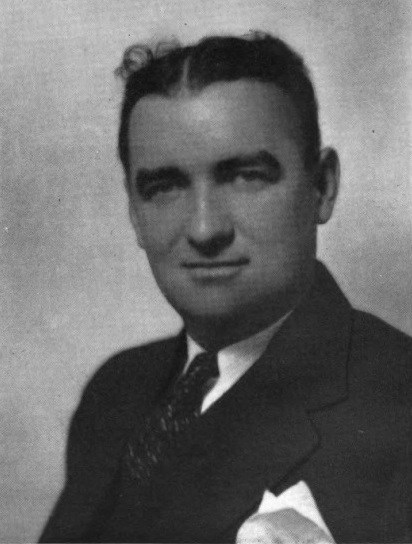

Member of the U.S. House of Representatives from New York
- In office November 5, 1935 – October 20, 1946
- Preceded by: William F. Brunner
- Succeeded by: Gregory McMahon
- Constituency: 2nd district (1935–45); 4th district (1945–46)

Personal details
- Born: July 21, 1902 County Mayo, Ireland
- Died: October 20, 1946 (aged 44) Flushing, Queens, New York, U.S.
- Citizenship: United States
- Party: Democratic Party
- Spouse: Emily B. La Mude Barry
- Education: New York University
- Profession: Attorney

William Bernard Barry (July 21, 1902 – October 20, 1946) was an American lawyer and politician who served six terms a United States representative from New York from 1935 to 1946.

== Biography ==
Barry was born in County Mayo, Ireland and immigrated to the United States in 1907 with his parents, Thomas J. and Catherine J. (Hennelly) Barry, who settled in Queens County, New York. He attended public schools and graduated from New York University in 1925 and from New York University School of Law in 1929. He was admitted to the bar in 1929 and commenced practice in New York City. He married Emily B. La Mude on February 7, 1934.

== Career ==
Barry served as assistant district attorney of Queens County, New York, in 1932 and 1933. He was special United States attorney for the Department of Justice between 1933 and 1935 and a member of the Democratic executive committee of Queens County between 1930 and 1935.

=== Congress ===
Elected as a Democrat to the Seventy-fourth Congress to fill the vacancy caused by the resignation of William F. Brunner as representative for New York's second district, Barry was reelected to the Seventy-fifth and to the four succeeding Congresses and served from November 5, 1935, until January 3, 1945. Elected for the fourth district, he served from January 3, 1945 until his death on October 20, 1946.

== Death ==
Barry died, from pneumonia, in St. Vincent's Hospital, New York, New York County, New York, on October 20, 1946 (age 44 years, 91 days). He is interred at Mount St. Mary Cemetery, Flushing, Queens, New York.

== See also ==
- List of members of the United States Congress who died in office (1900–1949)

U.S. House of Representatives
Preceded by William F. Brunner	Member of the U.S. House of Representatives from New York's 2nd congressional district 1935–1945	Succeeded by Leonard W. Hall
Preceded by Thomas H. Cullen	Member of the U.S. House of Representatives from New York's 4th congressional district 1945–1946	Succeeded by Gregory McMahon
