= Cornelius C. Schoonmaker =

American politician

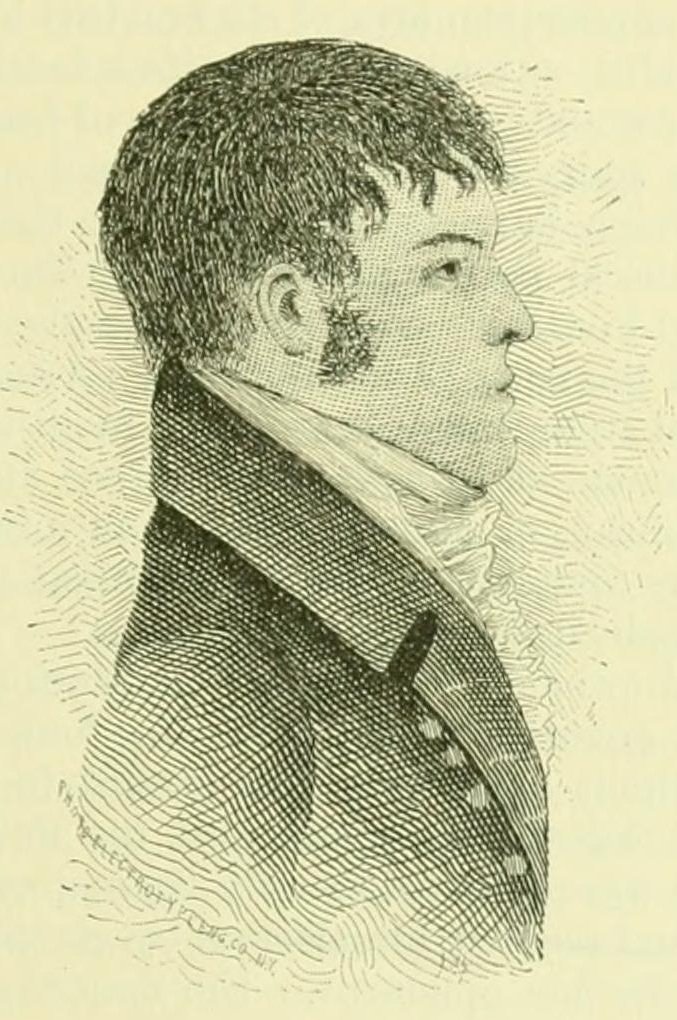
Cornelius C. Schoonmaker, New York Congressman

Cornelius Corneliusen Schoonmaker (June 1745 – February 1796) was a United States representative from New York.

== Life ==
Born in Shawangunk (now Wallkill), Ulster County, New York, he received a limited schooling, became a surveyor and was engaged in agricultural pursuits. He owned slaves. During the American Revolutionary War, he was a member of the committees of vigilance and safety. He was a member of the New York State Assembly (Ulster Co.) from 1777 to 1790 and was a member of the State Convention to ratify the U.S. Constitution in 1788. In April, 1790, Schoonmaker was elected to the 2nd United States Congress, holding office from March 4, 1791, to March 3, 1793. He was again a member of the State assembly in 1795.

Schoonmaker died in Shawangunk in February, 1796, and was interred in Old Shawangunk Churchyard at Bruynswick, in Shawangunk.

Congressman Marius Schoonmaker (1811–1894) was his grandson.

U.S. House of Representatives
Preceded by John Hathorn	Member of the U.S. House of Representatives from New York's 4th congressional district 1791–1793	Succeeded by Peter Van Gaasbeck
