= Gouverneur Kemble =

American politician

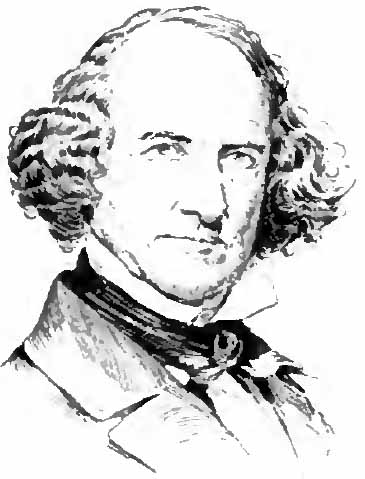
- Born: January 25, 1786; New York City, New York, United States
- Died: September 18, 1875 (aged 89); Cold Spring, New York, United States
- Education: Columbia College
- Occupations: diplomat, industrialist, Congressman
- Known for: two-term United States Congressman from New York (1837–1841)
- Notable work: helped found the West Point Foundry
- Political party: Democratic Party
- Father: Peter Kemble

Gouverneur Kemble (January 25, 1786 – September 18, 1875) was an American diplomat, industrialist, and two-term United States Congressman from New York from 1837 to 1841.

He helped found the West Point Foundry, a major producer of artillery during the American Civil War.

== Early life and education ==
Kemble was born in 1786 to a prominent family in New York City, the eldest son of prosperous attorney and merchant Peter Kemble of New Jersey. Ships of the firm Gouverneur & Kemble conducted trade in the West Indies, Europe and China. Kemble was educated in New York and graduated from Columbia College in 1803, then entered the mercantile business. He was friends with Washington Irving and other members of city society, who enjoyed socializing at Cockloft Hall (an old family mansion on the Passaic River at Woodside, Newark which Kemble inherited and was sometimes known as "Salmagundi" or the "Bachelor's Elysium"). He was a founding member of the "Lads of Kilkenny". His sister, Gertrude, married James Kirke Paulding in November, 1818. Through his grandmother Gertrude Bayard, Kemble descended both from the Schuyler family and the Van Cortlandt family.

== Diplomat ==
Kemble was sent to the Mediterranean as a naval agent during the Second Barbary War with Tripoli. As a young man with political connections, in 1816 he was appointed United States Consul at Cádiz in Spain, where his attention was attracted to the Spanish government's state-of-the-art process of casting cannon.

== Manufacturer ==
Returning home, Kemble saw an opportunity to introduce the casting process in the United States. Along with other partners including his brother William and a consortium of investors including General Joseph Gardner Swift of the U.S. Army, around 1817 he founded the West Point Foundry Association to produce artillery pieces for the United States Government. The need of such an establishment was demonstrated by the War of 1812. The foundry was built across the Hudson River from West Point in the village of Cold Spring, New York, and soon began to make cast iron steam engines for locomotives, gears, water pipes, and other iron products, as well as artillery. Despite the lack of local artisans and craftsmen skilled in ironworking, Kemble and his partners succeeded, especially after they hired William Young, a native of Belfast, Ireland. Robert P. Parrott became superintendent in 1836 and the Foundry weathered the Panic of 1837. Kemble continued to be president of the association until the expiration of the charter. He became known as the "Patriarch of Cold Spring" for his charitable activities in the village.

In 1823, Gouverneur Kemble leased land in Orange County, New York, for the mineral rights to mine iron ore. Four years later, the Kembles acquired most of the nearby Greenwood Iron Foundry and related industries. In 1839, the brothers sold the foundry to Parrott. A year later, his sister Mary married Parrott.

== Congress ==
Coat of Arms of Gouverneur Kemble

Kemble was an active member of the Democratic Party. He was elected to the Twenty-fifth and Twenty-sixth Congresses representing Westchester and Putnam counties, serving two terms during the presidency of Martin Van Buren. In 1840, he declined a nomination for a third term.

=== Later political activities ===
He served as a delegate to the Democratic National Convention in 1840 and 1860. He was elected as a delegate to the 1846 convention for the revising New York's state constitution.

In his later years, he was an active supporter of the Hudson River Railroad and the Panama Railway, and was a lifelong art collector and patron. David Hunter Strother, who gained fame for illustrated articles in Harper's Monthly, and Kemble helped found the "Century Club" for artists in New York City. In 1854 Kemble was elected into the National Academy of Design as an Honorary Academician.

=== Tontine Association ===
Kemble was one of the last survivors of the Tontine Association.

== Death and legacy ==
Gouverneur Kemble died in Cold Spring on September 16, 1875, at the age of 89 and was buried in Cold Spring Cemetery.

An 1853 oil portrait of Gouverneur Kemble by Asher Brown Durand is in the National Gallery of Art in Washington, D.C.

Famed Civil War general Gouverneur Kemble Warren, born in Cold Spring in 1830, was named for Kemble, a close friend of his father, Sylvanus Warren.

== Sources ==
- United States Congress. "Gouverneur Kemble (id: K000084)". Biographical Directory of the United States Congress.

U.S. House of Representatives
Preceded by Aaron Ward	Member of the U.S. House of Representatives from New York's 4th congressional district 1837–1841	Succeeded by Aaron Ward
