= William B. Maclay =

American politician

William Maclay
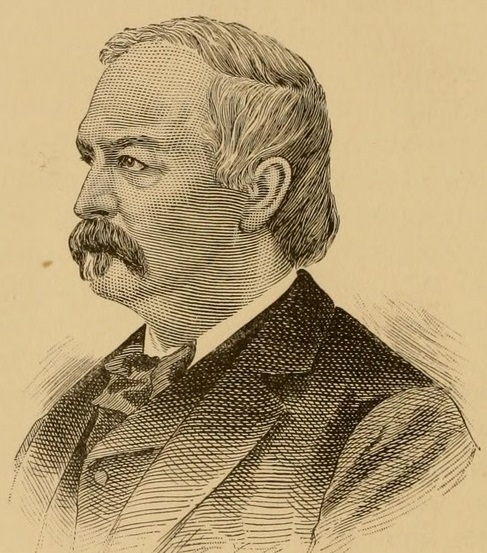

Member of the U.S. House of Representatives from New York
- In office March 4, 1843 – March 3, 1849
- Preceded by: Aaron Wood
- Succeeded by: Walter Underhill
- Constituency: 4th district
- In office March 4, 1857 – March 3, 1861
- Preceded by: Thomas R. Whitney
- Succeeded by: William Wall
- Constituency: 5th district

Personal details
- Born: March 20, 1812 New York City, US
- Died: February 19, 1882 (aged 69) New York City, US
- Resting place: Green-Wood Cemetery

William Brown Maclay (March 20, 1812 – February 19, 1882) was an American newspaperman, lawyer, and politician who served five terms as a United States representative from New York from 1843 to 1849, and from 1857 to 1861.

== Biography ==
Born in New York City, he received private instruction and graduated from the College of the City of New York in 1836. He was associate editor of the New York Quarterly Review in 1836, taught Latin, studied law, was admitted to the bar in 1839 and commenced the practice of his profession in New York City.

=== Political career ===
He was a member of the New York State Assembly from 1840 to 1842.

==== Congress ====
He was elected as a Democrat to the Twenty-eighth, Twenty-ninth, and Thirtieth Congresses, holding office from March 4, 1843, to March 3, 1849. He was an unsuccessful candidate for reelection in 1848 to the Thirty-first Congress, and was elected to the Thirty-fifth and Thirty-sixth Congresses, holding office from March 4, 1857, to March 4, 1861. He was not a candidate for reelection in 1860 to the Thirty-seventh Congress.

=== Death ===
He in 1882 died in New York City. Interment was in Green-Wood Cemetery, Brooklyn.

U.S. House of Representatives
Preceded by Aaron Ward	Member of the U.S. House of Representatives from New York's 4th congressional district 1843–1849	Succeeded by Walter Underhill
Preceded by Thomas R. Whitney	Member of the U.S. House of Representatives from New York's 5th congressional district 1857–1861	Succeeded by William Wall
