= Aaron Ward (politician) =

American politician

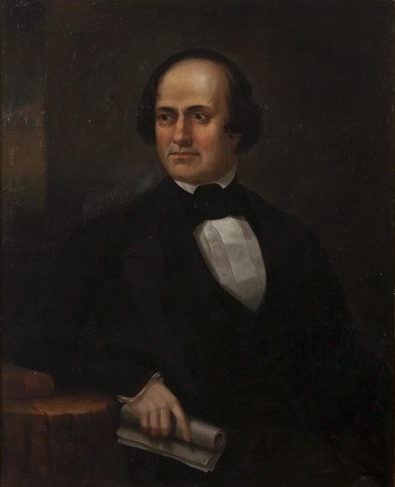

Member of the U.S. House of Representatives from New York's 4th district
- In office March 4, 1825 – March 3, 1829
- Preceded by: Joel Frost
- Succeeded by: Henry B. Cowles
- In office March 4, 1831 – March 3, 1837
- Preceded by: Henry B. Cowles
- Succeeded by: Gouverneur Kemble
- In office March 4, 1841 – March 3, 1843
- Preceded by: Gouverneur Kemble
- Succeeded by: William B. Maclay

Personal details
- Born: July 5, 1790 Sing, Sing, New York, U.S.
- Died: March 2, 1867 (aged 76) Georgetown (Washington, D.C.)
- Resting place: Dale Cemetery
- Party: Democratic

Aaron Ward (July 5, 1790 – March 2, 1867) was an American lawyer and politician from New York. He served five terms over three separate stints in the U.S. House of Representatives during the early-to-mid-19th century.

== Life ==
He was born in Sing Sing, Westchester County, New York, the son of Moses Ward. He completed preparatory studies in Mount Pleasant Academy, and then studied law.

=== War of 1812 ===
At the beginning of the War of 1812 he was commissioned a lieutenant in the 29th Regiment of Infantry, and in 1814 commissioned a captain.

=== Early career ===
Afterwards he continued to serve in the State Militia, and in 1830 he was promoted to major general. After the war, he resumed his legal studies in Oxford, New York, was admitted to the bar, and commenced practice in Sing Sing.

He was District Attorney of Westchester County from 1819 to 1822. On January 19, 1820, he married Mary L. Watson (1797–1853, daughter of Elkanah Watson).

=== Congress ===
Ward was elected as an Adams man to the 19th and 20th; as a Jacksonian to the 22nd, 23rd and 24th; and as a Democrat to the 27th United States Congress, holding office from March 4, 1825, to March 3, 1829; from March 4, 1831, to March 3, 1837; and from March 4, 1841, to March 3, 1843.

=== Later activities ===
He was a delegate to the New York State Constitutional Convention of 1846. In 1855, Ward ran on the Hard ticket for Secretary of State of New York, but was defeated by Joel T. Headley.

Ward was the first President of Dale Cemetery in Ossining and a trustee of Mount Pleasant Academy.

=== Death ===
He died in Georgetown, Washington, D.C., and was buried at Dale Cemetery.

=== Family ===
Ward's daughter Virginia Gadsby Ward was married to George Adlington Brandreth, and they were the parents of four daughters. Their grandchildren included photographer Yvette Borup Andrews.

Ward's daughter Josephine A. Ward (d. 1906) was the second wife of Senator John Renshaw Thomson (1800–1862), and in 1878 became the second wife of Maryland Governor Thomas Swann.

Congressman Elijah Ward was his cousin.

== Notes ==
U.S. House of Representatives
Preceded by Joel Frost	Member of the U.S. House of Representatives from New York's 4th congressional district 1825–1829	Succeeded by Henry B. Cowles
Preceded by Henry B. Cowles	Member of the U.S. House of Representatives from New York's 4th congressional district 1831–1837	Succeeded by Gouverneur Kemble
Preceded by Gouverneur Kemble	Member of the U.S. House of Representatives from New York's 4th congressional district 1841–1843	Succeeded by William B. Maclay
