= Bay Park, New York =

- Hamlet and census-designated place
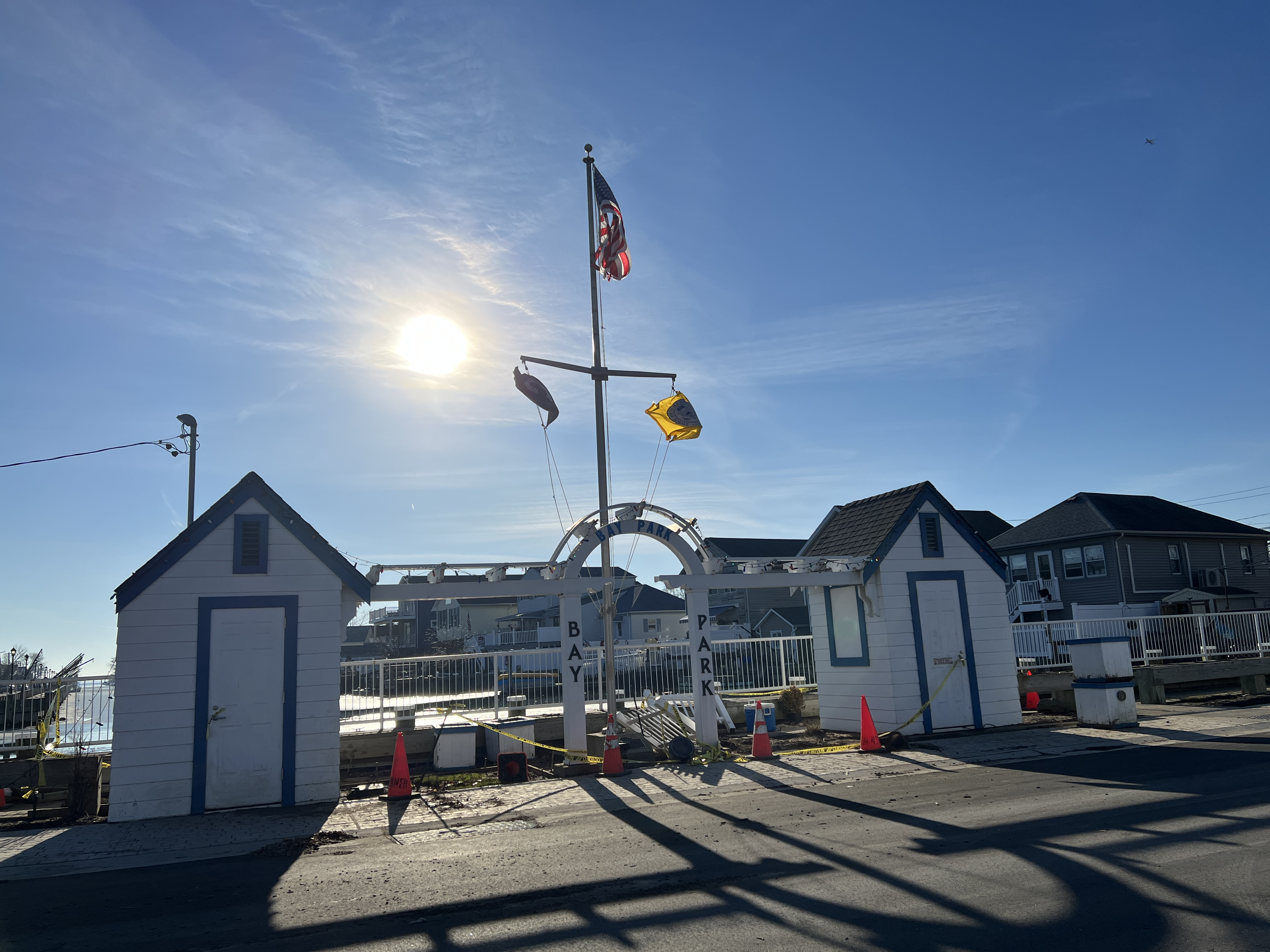
- A pedestrian plaza in Bay Park on December 30, 2022.

- Location in Nassau County and the state of New York

- Location on Long Island Location within the state of New York
- Coordinates: 40°37′56″N 73°40′10″W
- Country: United States
- State: New York
- County: Nassau
- Town: Hempstead

Area
  - Total: 0.60 sq mi (1.56 km^{2})
  - Land: 0.50 sq mi (1.30 km^{2})
  - Water: 0.10 sq mi (0.26 km^{2})
- Elevation: 9.8 ft (3 m)

Population (2020)
  - Total: 2,117
  - Density: 4,217/sq mi (1,628.3/km^{2})
- Time zone: UTC-5 (Eastern (EST))
  - Summer (DST): UTC-4 (EDT)
- ZIP Code: 11518 (East Rockaway)
- Area code: 516
- FIPS code: 36-04891
- GNIS feature ID: 0943183

Bay Park is a hamlet and census-designated place (CDP) in the Town of Hempstead in Nassau County, on the South Shore of Long Island, in New York, United States. The population was 2,117 at the 2020 census, down from 2,212 in 2010.

== History ==
Bay Park was part of neighboring East Rockaway until 1912.

The Bay Park Civic & Property Owners' Association (BPCA) was established by residents in 1926, with the first meeting being held the next year, on June 24, 1927.

The Bay Park Sewage Treatment Plant, which is located in the hamlet and is operated by the County of Nassau as part of the Nassau County Sewage District, failed during and as a result of Hurricane Sandy in 2012. Subsequently, it would receive repairs and upgrades – notably in the early 2020s. The upgrades to the sewage plant will assist in cutting the nitrogen levels in the waters along that part of Long Island's South Shore.

== Geography ==
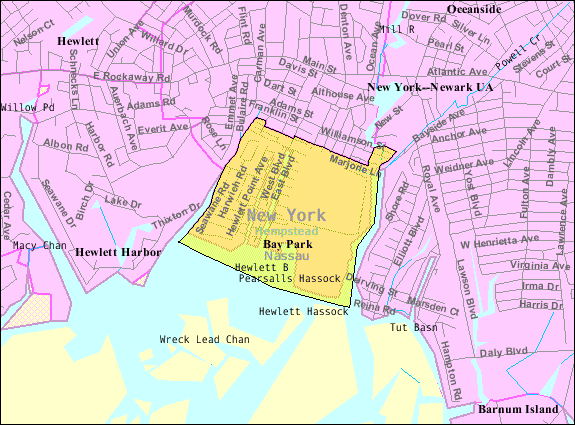
U.S. Census map of Bay Park.

According to the United States Census Bureau, the CDP has a total area of 0.6 square miles (1.6 km^{2}), of which 0.4 square miles (1.0 km^{2}) is land and 0.1 square miles (0.3 km^{2}), or 21.82%, is water.

== Demographics ==
Historical population
Census	Pop.	Note	%±
1960	2,467		—
1970	2,470		0.1%
1980	2,353		−4.7%
2000	2,300		—
2010	2,212		−3.8%
2020	2,117		−4.3%
U.S. Decennial Census Long Island Historical Population

=== Racial and ethnic composition ===
Bay Park CDP, New York – Racial and ethnic composition Note: the US Census treats Hispanic/Latino as an ethnic category. This table excludes Latinos from the racial categories and assigns them to a separate category. Hispanics/Latinos may be of any race.
Race / Ethnicity (NH = Non-Hispanic)	Pop 2000	Pop 2010	Pop 2020	% 2000	% 2010	% 2020
White alone (NH)	2,151	2,014	1,766	93.52%	91.05%	83.42%
Black or African American alone (NH)	6	6	42	0.26%	0.27%	1.98%
Native American or Alaska Native alone (NH)	0	0	2	0.00%	0.00%	0.09%
Asian alone (NH)	22	37	28	0.96%	1.67%	1.32%
Native Hawaiian or Pacific Islander alone (NH)	1	1	0	0.04%	0.05%	0.00%
Other race alone (NH)	0	0	10	0.00%	0.00%	0.47%
Mixed race or Multiracial (NH)	23	13	41	1.00%	0.59%	1.94%
Hispanic or Latino (any race)	97	141	228	4.22%	6.37%	10.77%
Total	2,300	2,212	2,117	100.00%	100.00%	100.00%

=== 2020 census ===
As of the 2020 census, Bay Park had a population of 2,117. The median age was 43.2 years. 19.6% of residents were under the age of 18 and 17.2% were 65 years of age or older. For every 100 females, there were 89.9 males, and for every 100 females age 18 and over there were 86.9 males age 18 and over.

100.0% of residents lived in urban areas, while 0.0% lived in rural areas.

There were 845 households, of which 31.5% had children under the age of 18 living in them. Of all households, 54.0% were married-couple households, 15.0% were households with a male householder and no spouse or partner present, and 26.5% were households with a female householder and no spouse or partner present. About 22.0% of all households were made up of individuals and 10.4% had someone living alone who was 65 years of age or older.

There were 888 housing units, of which 4.8% were vacant. The homeowner vacancy rate was 1.8% and the rental vacancy rate was 1.6%.

=== 2000 census ===
As of the census of 2000, there were 2,300 people, 874 households, and 636 families residing in the CDP. The population density was 5,305.4 inhabitants per square mile (2,048.4/km^{2}). There were 892 housing units at an average density of 2,057.6 per square mile (794.4/km^{2}). The racial makeup of the CDP was 96.48% White, 0.35% African American, 0.04% Native American, 0.96% Asian, 0.04% Pacific Islander, 0.87% from other races, and 1.26% from two or more races. Hispanic or Latino of any race were 4.22% of the population.

There were 874 households, out of which 31.7% had children under the age of 18 living with them, 58.4% were married couples living together, 10.0% had a female householder with no husband present, and 27.2% were non-families. 21.1% of all households were made up of individuals, and 9.0% had someone living alone who was 65 years of age or older. The average household size was 2.63 and the average family size was 3.10.

In the CDP, the population was spread out, with 21.7% under the age of 18, 6.9% from 18 to 24, 31.7% from 25 to 44, 26.2% from 45 to 64, and 13.5% who were 65 years of age or older. The median age was 40 years. For every 100 females, there were 96.9 males. For every 100 females age 18 and over, there were 92.7 males.

The median income for a household in the CDP was $64,063, and the median income for a family was $64,950. Males had a median income of $48,125 versus $36,755 for females. The per capita income for the CDP was $25,888. About 2.2% of families and 2.4% of the population were below the poverty line, including 4.9% of those under age 18 and 2.8% of those age 65 or over.

== Parks and recreation ==
- Bay Park – A Nassau County-owned park within the hamlet.

== Education ==
=== School districts ===
Bay Park is primarily located within the boundaries of the East Rockaway Union Free School District, while the eponymous county park is located within the boundaries of the Oceanside Union Free School District; all homes within the hamlet are within the boundaries of the East Rockaway UFSD. As such, all children who reside within the hamlet and attend public schools go to East Rockaway's schools.

=== Library districts ===
Bay Park is primarily located within the boundaries of the East Rockaway Library District, while the eponymous county park is located within the boundaries of the Oceanside Library District; the boundaries between both districts within the hamlet correspond with those for the school districts
