= Walter Underhill =

American politician

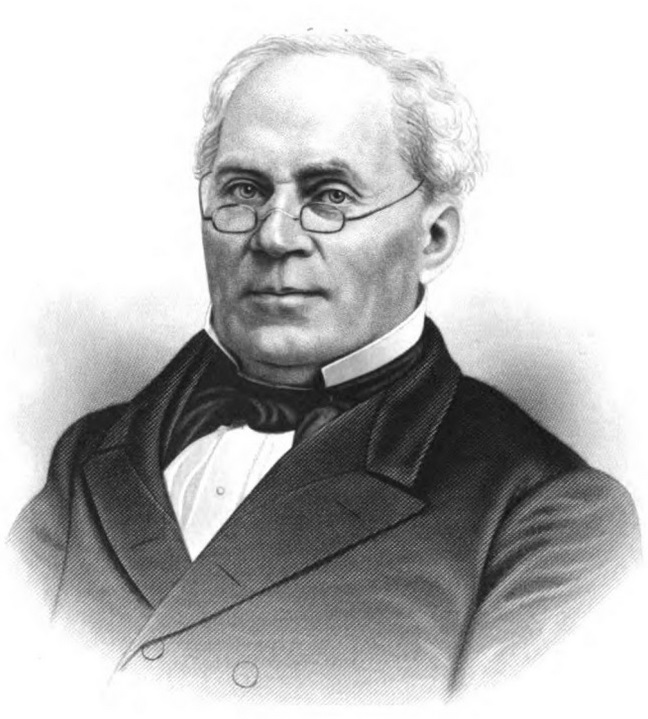
Walter Underhill, New York Congressman.

Walter Underhill (September 12, 1795 – August 17, 1866) was a United States representative from New York.

== Biography ==
Born in New York City, he completed preparatory studies and became active with his brothers in a successful flour business which had been started by their father.

Underhill was also involved in several civic endeavors, and served in local government. He was a trustee of the New York House of Refuge, and Treasurer of New York City for several years.

He served on the board of managers of the Society for the Reformation of Juvenile Delinquents in the city of New York from 1845 to 1866, and was Treasurer from 1857 to 1866.

Underhill was elected as a Whig to the Thirty-first Congress, holding office from March 4, 1849, to March 3, 1851. He was not a candidate for renomination in 1850. Underhill advocated an end to slavery, and also supported efforts to have former slaves settle in Liberia, with compensation paid to their former owners. Regarded as a moderate on the slavery issue, Underhill frequently conversed with Alexander H. Stephens, later Vice President of the Confederate States of America, as they sought ways to end slavery which would obtain enough public approval to avert the coming American Civil War.

After leaving office Underhill was President of the Mechanics & Traders' Insurance Company in New York City.

Underhill died in Whitestone, Long Island in 1866, and was interred was in Woodlawn Cemetery, Bronx.

U.S. House of Representatives
Preceded by William B. Maclay	Member of the U.S. House of Representatives from New York's 4th congressional district March 4, 1849 – March 3, 1851	Succeeded by John Henry Hobart Haws
