= Peter Van Gaasbeck =

American politician

Peter Van Gaasbeck (September 27, 1754 – 1797) was an American merchant and politician from Kingston, New York.

He was born in Ulster County, New York, and educated in Kingston. During the Revolutionary War he served as a Major in the Ulster County militia.

Van Gaasbeck was a successful merchant. He owned slaves. He was a supporter of the George Washington administration (the group later recognized as the Federalist Party), and was elected to the United States House of Representatives. He represented New York in the 3rd United States Congress, from March 4, 1793, to March 3, 1795, after being the Federalist candidate for his seat in 1791.

In 1794 Van Gaasbeck married Sarah Dumont (or Dumond).

He died in Kingston in 1797 and was buried at the First Dutch Reformed Church in Kingston.

His name is sometimes spelled "Van Gaasbeek."

U.S. House of Representatives
Preceded by Cornelius C. Schoonmaker	Member of the U.S. House of Representatives from New York's 4th congressional district 1793–1795	Succeeded by John Hathorn
