= John Hathorn =

American politician (1749–1825)

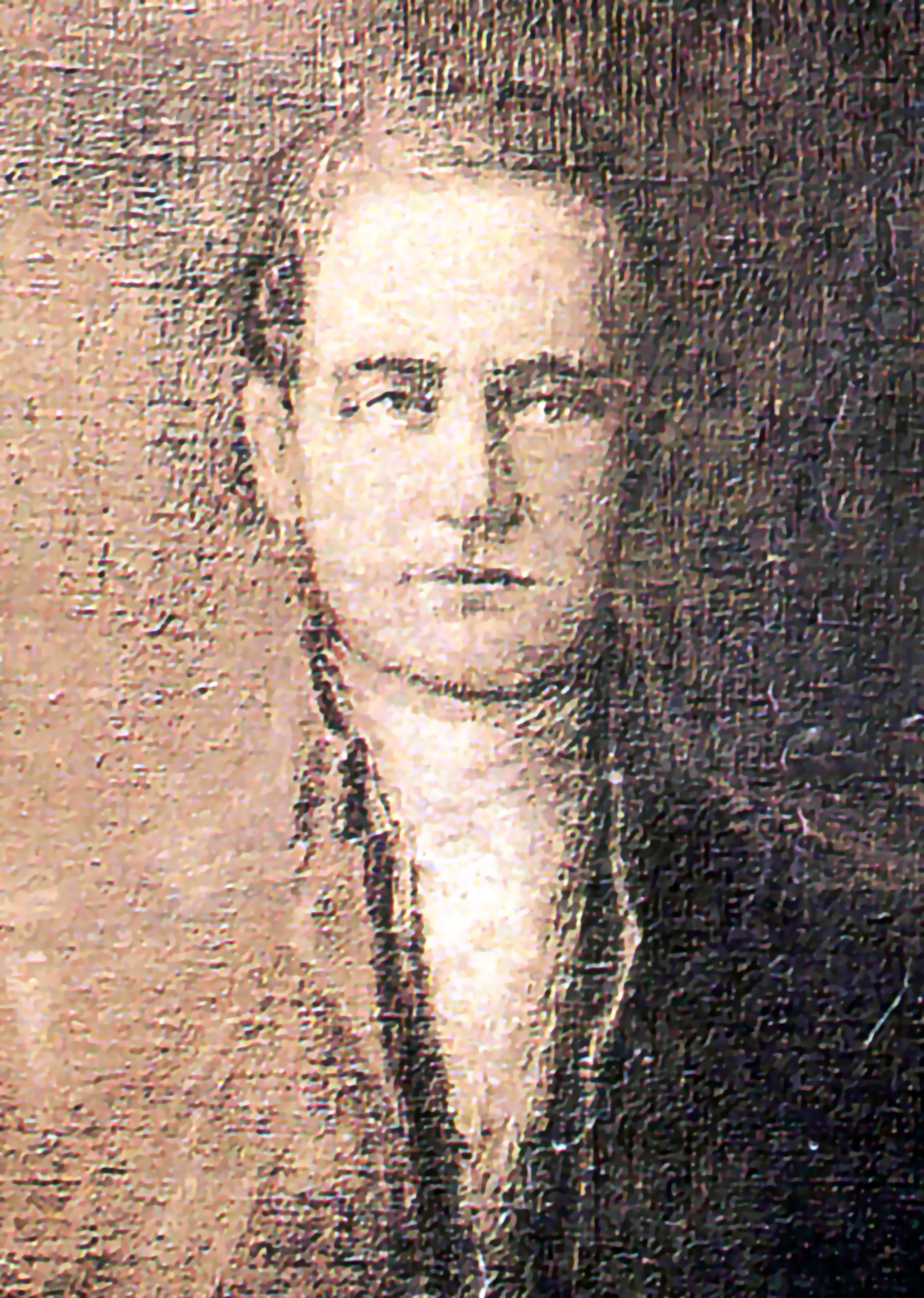
- Facial composite by C. Brower Darst (1907)

Member of the U.S. House of Representatives from New York's 4th District
- In office March 4, 1789 – March 3, 1791
- Preceded by: Nobody (District Created)
- Succeeded by: Cornelius C. Schoonmaker
- In office March 4, 1795 – March 3, 1797
- Preceded by: Peter Van Gaasbeck
- Succeeded by: Lucas Elmendorf

Member of the New York State Assembly
- In office 1795; 1805

Personal details
- Born: January 9, 1749 Wilmington, Delaware Colony, British America
- Died: February 19, 1825 (aged 76) Warwick, New York, U.S.
- Party: Democratic-Republican; Anti-Administration

John Hathorn (January 9, 1749 – February 19, 1825) was an American politician and Continental Army officer from New York.

== Life ==
He completed preparatory studies and became a surveyor and a school teacher. He moved to Warwick in the Province of New York, then a part of the precinct of Goshen and married Elizabeth Welling. He owned slaves. He was a captain in the local colonial militia, and became a colonel of the Fourth Orange County Regiment February 7, 1776, and served throughout the Revolutionary War. He served on the committee appointed to determine an effective location for the Hudson River Chain which prevented the British from advancing upriver, and he wrote the report thereafter. He was one of the commanders of the Battle of Minisink. After the war, on September 26, 1786, Hathorn became a brigadier general of the Orange County militia, and on October 8, 1793, a major general of the state militia.

Hathorn was a member from Orange County of the New York State Assembly in 1778, 1780, from 1782 to 1785, in 1795 and 1805, and served as Speaker in 1784.

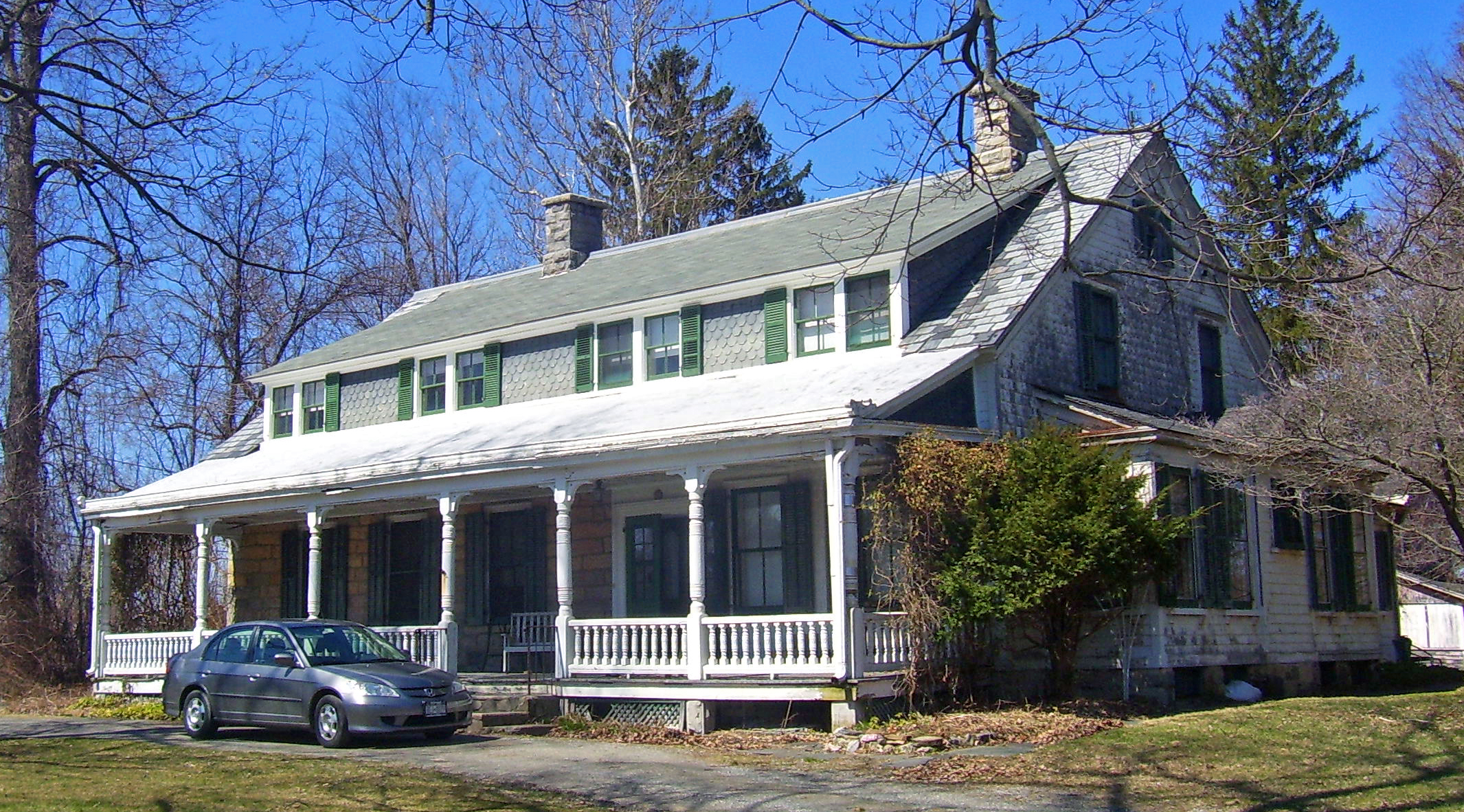
Hathorn's house in Warwick, now listed on the National Register of Historic Places

He was a member of the New York State Senate from 1786 to 1790 and from 1799 to 1803, and was a member of the Council of Appointment in 1787 and 1789. He was elected to the Confederation Congress in December 1788 but did not attend because it soon become defunct. In March 1789, he was elected to the First United States Congress, and served from April 23, 1789, to March 3, 1791. He was elected as a Democratic-Republican to the Fourth United States Congress, and served from March 4, 1795 to March 3, 1797. He also ran for the U.S. House in 1793, 1800, and 1802.

Hathorn engaged in mercantile pursuits until the time of his death.

He was buried in Warwick Cemetery. His stone house still stands on Hathorn Road, with his and his wife's initials worked in red brick on the south gable of the house.

In World War II, the United States Liberty ship SS John Hathorn was named in his honor.

Political offices
| Preceded by Evert Bancker | Speaker of the New York State Assembly; 1784 | Succeeded by David Gelston |
U.S. House of Representatives
| Preceded by new office | Member of the U.S. House of Representatives from New York's 4th congressional district 1789–1791 | Succeeded by Cornelius C. Schoonmaker |
| Preceded by Peter Van Gaasbeck | Member of the U.S. House of Representatives from New York's 4th congressional district 1795–1797 | Succeeded by Lucas C. Elmendorf |
