= Cantiague Park =

Park in Hicksville, New York, US

Coordinates: 40.771691°N 73.546040°W

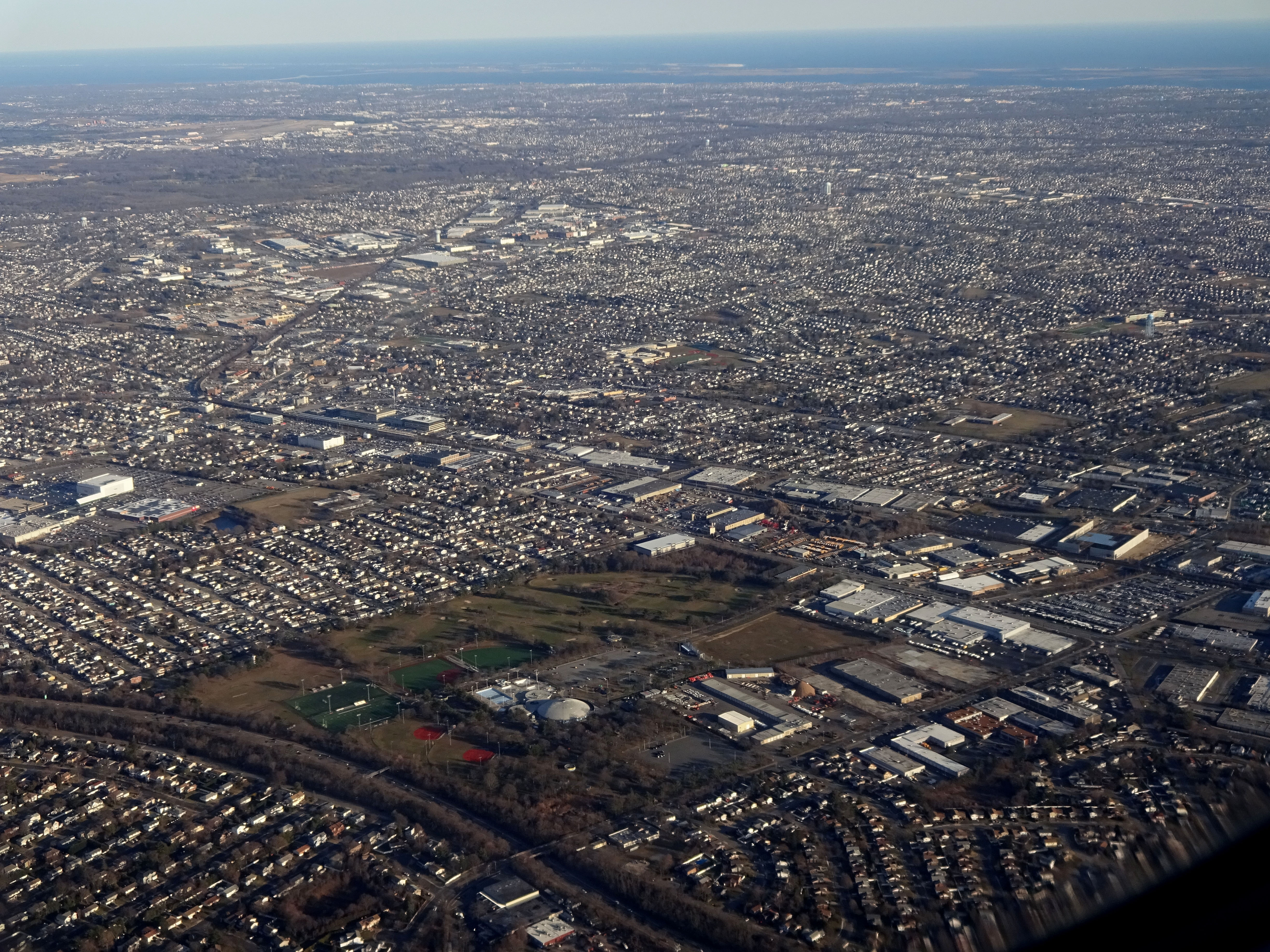
- Cantiague Park from the air in 2020
- Interactive map of Cantiague Park
- Type: Public
- Location: Hicksville, New York, United States
- Opened: 1961
- Operator: Nassau County, New York
- Website: www.nassaucountyny.gov/2791/Cantiague-Park

Cantiague Park is a public park owned and maintained by the Nassau County Department of Parks, Recreation, and Museums, located in Hicksville, New York, United States.

== History ==
Cantiague Park was opened by Nassau County to the public in 1961 in response to a growing population. It was the second major park opened by the county, the first being Eisenhower Park. Several of the facilities at the park were designed by Valley Stream-based Frederic P. Wiedersum Associates.

In the 2000s, Cantiague Park was one of several parks Nassau County considered transferring ownership of to the local towns (in this case, transferring control of Cantiague Park to the Town of Oyster Bay). The park ultimately remains owned by Nassau County.

== Activities ==
=== Athletics ===
- Five tennis courts
- Turf baseball and softball fields
- Three basketball courts
- Six handball and paddleball courts
- Multipurpose turf field
- Baseball and softball batting cage

=== Golf ===
The park features a 1,878 yard, 9-hole golf course and a driving range. For families, there is also an 18-hole miniature golf course.

=== Ice Skating ===
Cantiague Park is home to an indoor-skating-rink that has been used in the past by both professionals and "regular" people. Olympic gold medalist Nancy Kerrigan performed there in 2004 and the New York Islanders practiced in this facility from 1979 to 1992.

=== Swimming ===
The park has a large swimming complex with:

- Olympic-sized pool
- Two water slides
- Diving pool
- "Kiddie" pool
- Training pool
- Waterplay area

=== Other activities ===
There is a generally large gaming, playground and picnic area for all to enjoy with chess and checker boards.
