= Wantagh Park =

Public park in Nassau County, New York, US

Coordinates: 40°38′53″N 73°30′42″W

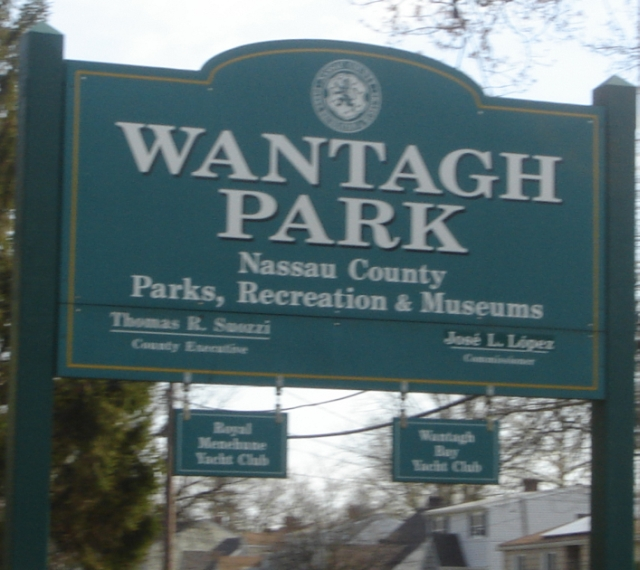
- Type: Public
- Area: 111 acres (45 ha)
- Owned by: Nassau County, New York
- Operated by: Nassau County, New York

Wantagh Park is a county park located in southeastern Nassau County, New York, within the hamlet of Wantagh. At 111 acres (0.45 km^{2}) the park provides various recreational activities along a picturesque waterfront location.

== Activities in the park ==
=== Athletics ===
- 18-Hole mini-golf course.
- 1-mile and 2-mile (3.2 km) walking paths that are also used for jogging and bicycle riding.
- 1 basketball court.
- 5 tennis courts.
- 3 softball fields and 1 baseball field.
- 1 roller rink for roller blading/roller skating.

The ball fields are lighted during the summer season.

=== Boating & fishing ===
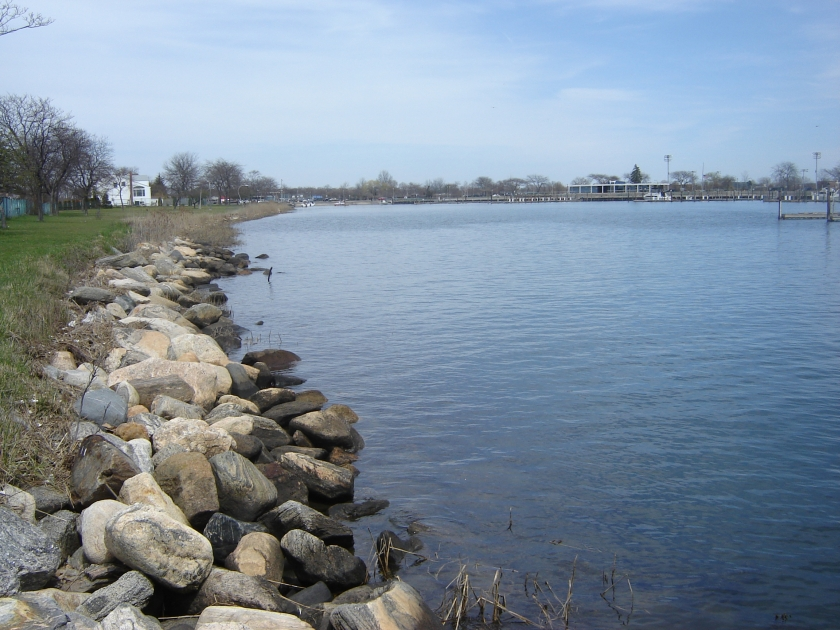
Wantagh Park Marina

The southeastern area of Wantagh park consists mainly of a large boating marina and a launch ramp. The marina and ramp which requires a fee and a permit is also home to the Wantagh Bay Yacht Club and the Royal Menehune Yacht Club.

Just beyond the marina is the fishing pier open year-round free of charge.

=== Swimming complex ===
The swimming complex, which charges a fee, features four pools- Olympic-sized, diving, training and "kiddie". There are also an interactive water-play area and two Water slides (30 ft) inside the complex. Showers, lockers, concession stands, and lounge and deck chairs are widely available.

In 2006, the pool at Wantagh Park was named "Best Public Pool on Long Island" by Long Island Press, the weekly newspaper.

=== Other ===
- Two playgrounds: one located at the north of the park; and the rebuilt marine playground by the tennis courts
- An enclosed astro-turf dog run (split into large and small dog areas).
- A total of 12 picnic areas for reservation (4 by the ball fields, 4 by the pool/canal, 3 shelters, & an area by the lighthouse). Plus, a first-come, first-served area in the front of the park.
- A community room that can be rented for special occasions.
- Checkers and chess tables
- Summer Camp Program (Summer Recreation)

On the Memorial day weekend the Wantagh Bay Yacht Club sponsors a Blessing of the Fleet. There is a ceremony honoring all the soldiers lost in Wars . A ceremonial wreath is then dropped in the Marina and a boat with a clergyman aboard moves around the Marina blessing all the boats for the coming year. Flowers are dropped in the water and the boats sound their horns acknowledging the blessing.
