= 1795 United States House of Representatives elections in Virginia =

Sixteen of the nineteen Virginia incumbents were re-elected.

District	Incumbent	Party	First elected	Result	Candidates
Virginia 1	Robert Rutherford	Anti-Administration	1793	Incumbent re-elected to a new party. Democratic-Republican gain.	√ Robert Rutherford (Democratic-Republican); Daniel Morgan (Federalist)
Virginia 2	Andrew Moore	Anti-Administration	1789	Incumbent re-elected to a new party. Democratic-Republican gain.	√ Andrew Moore (Democratic-Republican)
Virginia 3	Joseph Neville	Anti-Administration	1793	Incumbent lost re-election. New member elected. Democratic-Republican gain.	√ George Jackson (Democratic-Republican); Joseph Neville (Democratic-Republican); Thomas Wilson; John Skidmore
Virginia 4	Francis Preston	Anti-Administration	1793	Incumbent re-elected to a new party. Democratic-Republican gain.	√ Francis Preston (Democratic-Republican); Arthur Campbell
Virginia 5	George Hancock	Pro-Administration	1793	Incumbent re-elected to a new party. Federalist gain.	√ George Hancock (Federalist)
Virginia 6	Isaac Coles	Anti-Administration	1793	Incumbent re-elected to a new party. Democratic-Republican gain.	√ Isaac Coles (Democratic-Republican); Simon Crae MacMahon; Matthew Clay (Democratic-Republican)
Virginia 7	Abraham B. Venable	Anti-Administration	1790	Incumbent re-elected to a new party. Democratic-Republican gain.	√ Abraham B. Venable (Democratic-Republican) 61.0% Thomas Woodson 19.8% Joseph Wyatt 18.9% Peter Johnson 0.2% William Wilson 0.1%
Virginia 8	Thomas Claiborne	Anti-Administration	1793	Incumbent re-elected to a new party. Democratic-Republican gain.	√ Thomas Claiborne (Democratic-Republican); Jesse Brown; Samuel Hopkins; Samuel Goode (Democratic-Republican); Sterling Edmunds
Virginia 9	William B. Giles	Anti-Administration	1790	Incumbent re-elected to a new party. Democratic-Republican gain.	√ William B. Giles (Democratic-Republican)
Virginia 10	Carter B. Harrison	Anti-Administration	1793	Incumbent re-elected to a new party. Democratic-Republican gain.	√ Carter B. Harrison (Democratic-Republican)
Virginia 11	Josiah Parker	Pro-Administration	1789	Incumbent re-elected to a new party. Federalist gain.	√ Josiah Parker (Federalist); Robert Cowper
Virginia 12	John Page	Anti-Administration	1789	Incumbent re-elected to a new party. Democratic-Republican gain.	√ John Page (Democratic-Republican)
Virginia 13	Samuel Griffin	Pro-Administration	1789	Incumbent retired. New member elected. Democratic-Republican gain. The loser unsuccessfully contested the election.	√ John Clopton (Democratic-Republican); Burwell Bassett (Democratic-Republican); Miles Selden; Meriwether Jones
Virginia 14	Francis Walker	Anti-Administration	1793	Incumbent retired. New member elected. Democratic-Republican gain.	√ Samuel J. Cabell (Democratic-Republican)
Virginia 15	James Madison Jr.	Anti-Administration	1789	Incumbent re-elected to a new party. Democratic-Republican gain.	√ James Madison Jr. (Democratic-Republican)
Virginia 16	Anthony New	Anti-Administration	1793	Incumbent re-elected to a new party. Democratic-Republican gain.	√ Anthony New (Democratic-Republican)
Virginia 17	Richard Bland Lee	Pro-Administration	1789	Incumbent lost re-election. New member elected. Democratic-Republican gain.	√ Richard Brent (Democratic-Republican); Richard Bland Lee (P)
Virginia 18	John Nicholas	Anti-Administration	1793	Incumbent re-elected to a new party. Democratic-Republican gain.	√ John Nicholas (Democratic-Republican)
Virginia 19	John Heath	Anti-Administration	1793	Incumbent re-elected to a new party. Democratic-Republican gain.	√ John Heath (Democratic-Republican)

== See also ==
- List of United States representatives from Virginia
- United States House of Representatives elections, 1794 and 1795
