= 1792–93 United States House of Representatives elections =

House elections for the 3rd U.S. Congress

- August 27, 1792 – September 6, 1793

All 105 seats in the United States House of Representatives 53 seats needed for a majority
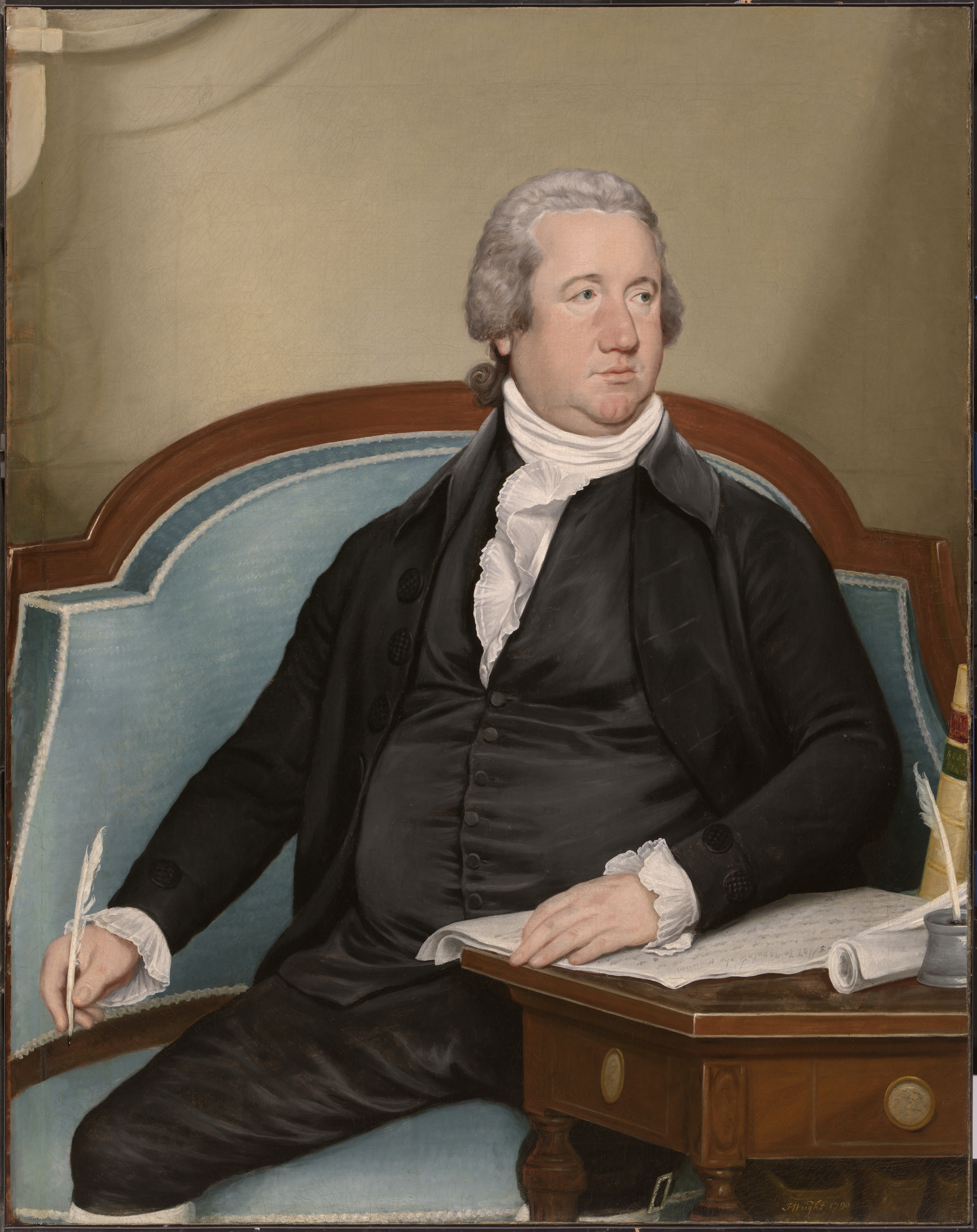

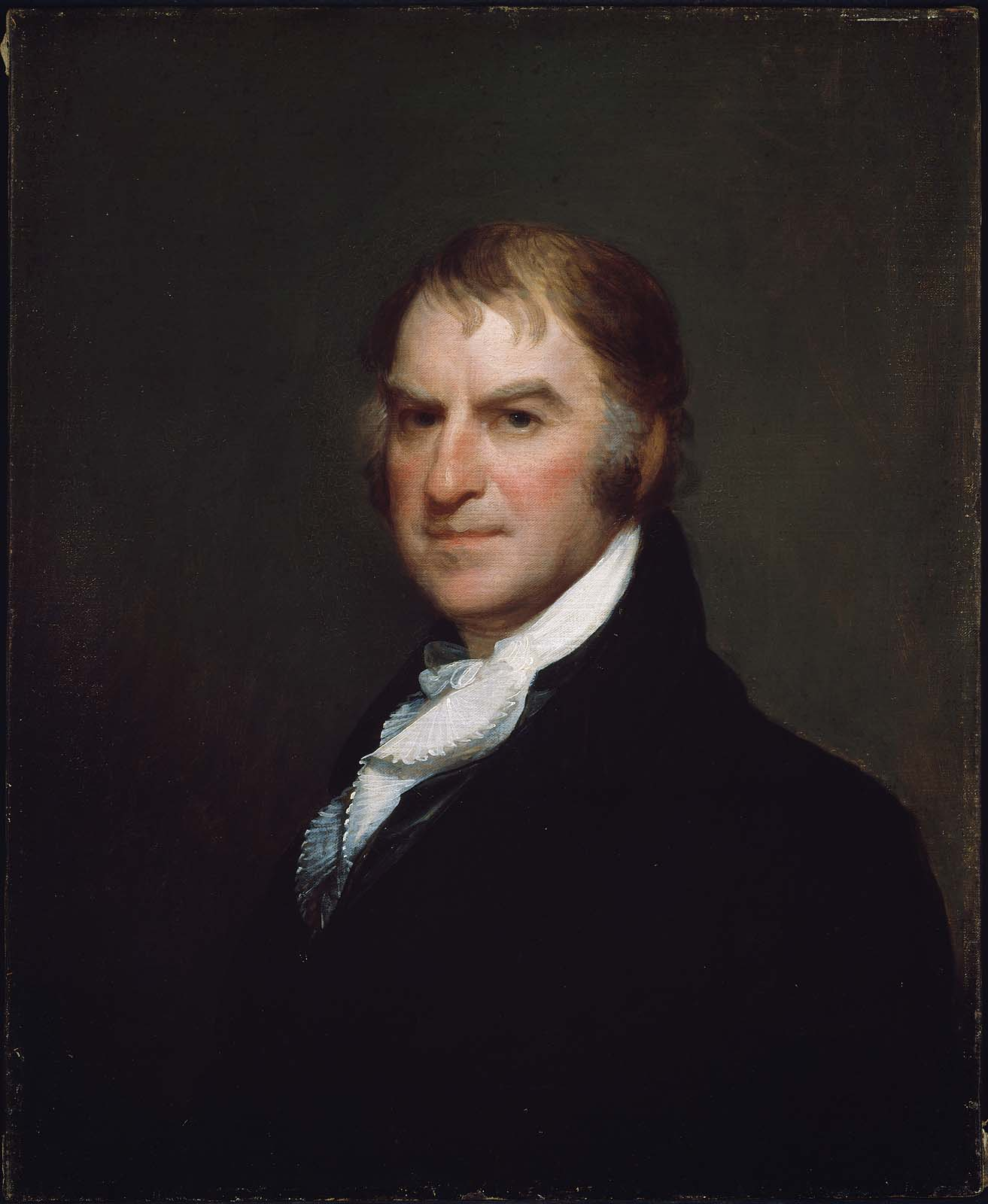
	Majority party	Minority party
Leader	Frederick Muhlenberg (Note: Muhlenberg was elected speaker by Anti-Administration Party members but continued to affiliate with the Pro-Administration Party.)	Theodore Sedgwick
Party	Anti-Administration	Pro-Administration
Leader's seat	Pennsylvania at-large	Massachusetts 2nd
Last election	30 seats	39 seats
Seats won	54	51
Seat change	▲24	▲12
- Results: Pro-Administration hold Pro-Administration gain Anti-Administration hold Anti-Administration gain Undistricted territory
Speaker before election
Jonathan Trumbull
Pro-Administration
Elected Speaker
Frederick Muhlenberg
Pro-Administration

The 1792–93 United States House of Representatives elections were held on various dates in various states between August 27, 1792, and September 6, 1793. Each state set its own date for its elections to the House of Representatives before the first session of the 3rd United States Congress convened on December 2, 1793. With the addition of the new state of Kentucky's representatives, and the congressional reapportionment based on the 1790 United States census, the size of the House increased to 105 seats.

They coincided with the re-election of President George Washington. While Washington ran for president as an independent, his followers (more specifically, the supporters of Alexander Hamilton) formed the nation's first organized political party, the Federalist Party, whose members and sympathizers are identified as pro-Administration on this page. In response, followers of Thomas Jefferson and James Madison created the opposition Democratic-Republican Party, who are identified as anti-Administration on this page. The Federalists promoted urbanization, industrialization, mercantilism, a centralized government, and a broad interpretation of the United States Constitution. In contrast, the Democratic-Republicans supported the ideal of an agrarian republic made up of self-sufficient farmers and small, localized governments with limited power.

Despite nearly unanimous support for Washington as a presidential candidate, Jeffersonian ideas edged out Hamiltonian principles at the ballot box for congressional candidates, with the Democratic-Republicans taking 24 seats more than they had prior to the organization of their political movement. Most of the increase was due to the addition of new seats in Western regions as a result of the 1790 census. Dominated by agrarian culture, these Western territories offered strong support to Democratic-Republican congressional candidates. As a result, they secured a thin majority in the legislature.

== Election summaries ==
In this period, each state fixed its own date for its congressional election as early as August 1792 (in New Hampshire and Rhode Island) and as late as September 1793 (in Kentucky). In some states, the congressional delegation was not elected until after the legal start of the Congress (on the 4th day of March in the odd-numbered year), but as the first session of Congress typically began in November or December, the elections took place before Congress actually met. The 3rd Congress first met on December 2, 1793.

These were the first elections held after reapportionment following the first census. Thirty-six new seats were added, with 1 state losing 1 seat, 3 states having no change, and the remaining 11 states gaining between 1 and 9 seats. This was the first apportionment based on actual census data, the apportionment for the 1st and 2nd Congresses being set by the Constitution using estimated populations.

↓
54	51
Anti-Administration	Pro-Administration

State	Type	Date	Total seats		Anti- Administration		Pro-Administration	
State	Type	Date	Seats	Change	Seats	Change	Seats	Change
General elections
New Hampshire	At-large	August 27, 1792	4	▲1	1	▲1	3	Steady
Rhode Island	At-large	August 28, 1792	2	▲1	0	Steady	2	▲1
Connecticut	At-large	September 17, 1792	7	▲2	0	Steady	7	▲2
Georgia	At-large	October 1, 1792	2	▼1	2	▼1	0	Steady
Maryland	Districts	October 1, 1792	8	▲2	4	▲1	4	▲1
Delaware	At-large	October 2, 1792	1	Steady	0	Steady	1	Steady
New Jersey	At-large	October 9, 1792	5	▲1	0	Steady	5	▲1
Pennsylvania	At-large	October 9, 1792	13	▲5	8	▲4	5	▲1
Massachusetts	Mixed	November 2, 1792 (Note: Massachusetts required a majority for election, which led to additional ballots on January 14, 1793 and April 1, 1793.)	14	▲6	3	▲2	11	▲4
New York	Districts	January 2, 1793	10	▲4	3	▲1	7	▲3
Vermont	Districts	January 7, 1793 (Note: Vermont required a majority for election, which led to an additional ballot on March 20, 1793.)	2	Steady	2	Steady	0	Steady
South Carolina	Districts	February 5, 1793	6	▲1	5	▲3	1	▼2
North Carolina	Districts	February 15, 1793	10	▲5	9	▲6	1	▼1
Late elections (after the March 4, 1793 beginning of the 3rd Congress)
Virginia	Districts	March 18, 1793	19	▲9	15	▲7	4	▲2
Kentucky	Districts	September 6, 1793	2	Steady	2	Steady	0	Steady
Total			105	▲36	54 51.4%	▲24	51 48.6%	▲12

House seats
Anti-Admin	51.43%
Pro-Admin	48.57%

== Change in composition ==
Anti-Administration	Pro-Administration	Vacant

=== End of the 2nd Congress ===
NC‑3	NC‑2	NY‑4	NY‑1	NJ‑AL	MA‑3	MD‑6	MD‑4	MD‑3	KY‑2	KY‑1	GA‑3	GA‑2	GA‑1	← Anti-Administration					
NC‑4	PA‑2	PA‑4	PA‑6	PA‑8	SC‑4	SC‑5	VT‑1	VT‑2	VA‑3	VA‑5	VA‑6	VA‑7	VA‑9	VA‑10	VA‑2	VA‑8	VA‑4	VA‑1	SC‑3
Majority →																			SC‑2
MA‑7	MA‑8	NH‑AL	NH‑AL	NH‑AL	NJ‑AL	NJ‑AL	NJ‑AL	NY‑2	NY‑3	NY‑5	NY‑6	NC‑1	NC‑5	PA‑1	PA‑3	PA‑5	PA‑7	RI‑AL	SC‑1
MA‑6	MA‑5	MA‑4	MA‑2	MA‑1	MD‑5	MD‑2	MD‑1	DE‑AL	CT‑AL	CT‑AL	CT‑AL	CT‑AL	CT‑AL	← Pro-Administration					

=== Beginning of the 3rd Congress ===
Anti-Administration →								DE‑AL	GA‑AL	GA‑AL	KY‑1	KY‑2	MD‑2	MD‑4	MD‑5	MD‑6	MA‑1	MA‑2	MA‑4
PA‑AL	PA‑AL	PA‑AL	PA‑AL	PA‑AL	PA‑AL	PA‑AL	NC‑10	NC‑9	NC‑8	NC‑6	NC‑5	NC‑4	NC‑3	NC‑2	NC‑1	NY‑5	NY‑3	NY‑1	NH‑AL
PA‑AL	SC‑2	SC‑3	SC‑4	SC‑5	SC‑6	VT‑1	VT‑2	VA‑1	VA‑2	VA‑3	VA‑4	VA‑6	VA‑7	VA‑8	VA‑9	VA‑10	VA‑12	VA‑14	VA‑15
Majority →																			VA‑16
NY‑6	NY‑7	NY‑8	NY‑9	NY‑10	NC‑7	PA‑AL	PA‑AL	PA‑AL	PA‑AL	PA‑AL	RI‑AL	RI‑AL	SC‑1	VA‑5	VA‑11	VA‑13	VA‑17	VA‑19	VA‑18
NY‑4	NY‑2	NJ‑AL	NJ‑AL	NJ‑AL	NJ‑AL	NJ‑AL	NH‑AL	NH‑AL	NH‑AL	MA‑AL	MA‑4	MA‑4	MA‑3	MA‑3	MA‑2	MA‑2	MA‑2	MA‑1	MA‑1
Pro-Administration →								CT‑AL	CT‑AL	CT‑AL	CT‑AL	CT‑AL	CT‑AL	CT‑AL	MD‑1	MD‑3	MD‑7	MD‑8	MA‑1

== Special elections ==
There were special elections in 1792 and 1793 during the 2nd and 3rd United States Congresses.

Elections are sorted here by state then district.

=== 2nd Congress ===
District	Incumbent			This race	
District	Member	Party	First elected	Results	Candidates
Kentucky 1 "Southern District"	Kentucky admitted June 1, 1792.			New member elected September 7, 1792 and seated November 9, 1792. Anti-Administration gain. Winner was later re-elected to the next term; see below.	▌ ✓ Christopher Greenup (Anti-Admin.) (Note: Source does not give numbers of votes or has incomplete data.); ▌Robert Brackenridge (Unknown)
Kentucky 2 "Northern District"	Kentucky admitted June 1, 1792.			New member elected September 7, 1792 and seated November 8, 1792.. Anti-Administration gain. Winner was later re-elected to the next term; see below.	▌ ✓ Alexander D. Orr (Anti-Admin.); ▌Hubbard Taylor (Unknown)
Georgia 1	Anthony Wayne	Anti- Administration	1791	Incumbent disqualified March 21, 1792. New member elected July 9, 1792. Anti-Administration hold. Winner later lost re-election to the next term; see below.	▌ ✓ John Milledge (Anti-Admin.) 55.2%; ▌Matthew McAllister (Pro-Admin.) 44.8%; ▌John Glen (Unknown) 0.2%
Maryland 2	Joshua Seney	Anti- Administration	1789	Incumbent resigned December 6, 1792 to become Chief Justice of Maryland's 3rd Judicial District. New member elected January 7–10, 1793. Pro-Administration gain. Winner was already elected to the next term; see below.	▌ ✓ William Hindman (Pro-Admin.) 63.2%; ▌Thomas Whittington (Unknown) 36.8%

=== 3rd Congress ===
District	Incumbent			This race	
District	Member	Party	First elected	Results	Candidates
Connecticut at-large	Jonathan Sturges	Pro- Administration	1788	Incumbent resigned to become Associate Justice of the Connecticut Supreme Court. New member elected April 8, 1793. (Note: Date given for the start of the term, of the person elected at the special election. In some cases this is clearly wrong as the date of the legal start of the Congress is given, even though the member was elected at a later date.); Pro-Administration hold.	▌ ✓ Uriah Tracy (Pro-Admin.) 49.8%; ▌Zephaniah Swift (Pro-Admin.) 18.5%; ▌Asher Miller (Unknown) (Note: Party affiliation not given in source) 16.1%; ▌Jonathan Ingersoll (Pro-Admin.) 9.9%; ▌Tapping Reeve (Unknown) 5.7%
Connecticut at-large	Benjamin Huntington	Pro- Administration	1788	Representative-elect resigned. New member elected September 16, 1793. Pro-Administration hold.	▌ ✓ Jonathan Ingersoll (Pro-Admin.); [data missing]
Connecticut at-large	Jonathan Ingersoll	Pro- Administration	1793 (special)	Representative-elect Ingersoll declined the seat and Representative-elect Mitchell resigned to become U.S. Senator. Two new members elected on a general ticket November 11, 1793. Two Pro-Administration holds.	▌ ✓ Joshua Coit (Pro-Admin.) 35.7%; ▌ ✓ Zephaniah Swift (Pro-Admin.) 24.2%; ▌James Davenport (Pro-Admin.) 17.2%; ▌Roger Griswold (Pro-Admin.) 12.6%; ▌Chauncey Goodrich (Pro-Admin.) 5.1%; ▌Nathaniel Smith (Pro-Admin.) 3.1%; ▌Samuel W. Dana (Pro-Admin.) 2.1%
Connecticut at-large	Stephen M. Mitchell	Pro- Administration	1792	Representative-elect Ingersoll declined the seat and Representative-elect Mitchell resigned to become U.S. Senator. Two new members elected on a general ticket November 11, 1793. Two Pro-Administration holds.	▌ ✓ Joshua Coit (Pro-Admin.) 35.7%; ▌ ✓ Zephaniah Swift (Pro-Admin.) 24.2%; ▌James Davenport (Pro-Admin.) 17.2%; ▌Roger Griswold (Pro-Admin.) 12.6%; ▌Chauncey Goodrich (Pro-Admin.) 5.1%; ▌Nathaniel Smith (Pro-Admin.) 3.1%; ▌Samuel W. Dana (Pro-Admin.) 2.1%

== Connecticut ==
Connecticut gained two seats in reapportionment following the 1790 census.

District	Incumbent			This race	
District	Member	Party	First elected	Results	Candidates
Connecticut at-large 7 seats on a general ticket	James Hillhouse	Pro-Administration	1790	Incumbent re-elected.	▌ ✓ Jonathan Trumbull Jr. (Pro-Admin.) 14.1%; ▌ ✓ James Hillhouse (Pro-Admin.) 13.0%; ▌ ✓ Jonathan Sturges (Pro-Admin.) 11.5%; ▌ ✓ Benjamin Huntington (Pro-Admin.) 10.6%; ▌ ✓ Jeremiah Wadsworth (Pro-Admin.) 10.4%; ▌ ✓ Amasa Learned (Pro-Admin.) 9.5%; ▌ ✓ Stephen Mix Mitchell (Pro-Admin.) 7.8%; ▌Uriah Tracy (Pro-Admin.) 6.3%; ▌Jonathan Ingersoll (Pro-Admin.) 5.4%; ▌Asher Miller (Unknown) 4.3%; ▌Zephaniah Swift (Pro-Admin.) 4.3%; ▌Tapping Reeve (Unknown) 3.0%
Connecticut at-large 7 seats on a general ticket	Amasa Learned	Pro-Administration	1791 (special)	Incumbent re-elected.	▌ ✓ Jonathan Trumbull Jr. (Pro-Admin.) 14.1%; ▌ ✓ James Hillhouse (Pro-Admin.) 13.0%; ▌ ✓ Jonathan Sturges (Pro-Admin.) 11.5%; ▌ ✓ Benjamin Huntington (Pro-Admin.) 10.6%; ▌ ✓ Jeremiah Wadsworth (Pro-Admin.) 10.4%; ▌ ✓ Amasa Learned (Pro-Admin.) 9.5%; ▌ ✓ Stephen Mix Mitchell (Pro-Admin.) 7.8%; ▌Uriah Tracy (Pro-Admin.) 6.3%; ▌Jonathan Ingersoll (Pro-Admin.) 5.4%; ▌Asher Miller (Unknown) 4.3%; ▌Zephaniah Swift (Pro-Admin.) 4.3%; ▌Tapping Reeve (Unknown) 3.0%
Connecticut at-large 7 seats on a general ticket	Jonathan Sturges	Pro-Administration	1788	Incumbent re-elected.	▌ ✓ Jonathan Trumbull Jr. (Pro-Admin.) 14.1%; ▌ ✓ James Hillhouse (Pro-Admin.) 13.0%; ▌ ✓ Jonathan Sturges (Pro-Admin.) 11.5%; ▌ ✓ Benjamin Huntington (Pro-Admin.) 10.6%; ▌ ✓ Jeremiah Wadsworth (Pro-Admin.) 10.4%; ▌ ✓ Amasa Learned (Pro-Admin.) 9.5%; ▌ ✓ Stephen Mix Mitchell (Pro-Admin.) 7.8%; ▌Uriah Tracy (Pro-Admin.) 6.3%; ▌Jonathan Ingersoll (Pro-Admin.) 5.4%; ▌Asher Miller (Unknown) 4.3%; ▌Zephaniah Swift (Pro-Admin.) 4.3%; ▌Tapping Reeve (Unknown) 3.0%
Connecticut at-large 7 seats on a general ticket	Jonathan Trumbull Jr.	Pro-Administration	1788	Incumbent re-elected.	▌ ✓ Jonathan Trumbull Jr. (Pro-Admin.) 14.1%; ▌ ✓ James Hillhouse (Pro-Admin.) 13.0%; ▌ ✓ Jonathan Sturges (Pro-Admin.) 11.5%; ▌ ✓ Benjamin Huntington (Pro-Admin.) 10.6%; ▌ ✓ Jeremiah Wadsworth (Pro-Admin.) 10.4%; ▌ ✓ Amasa Learned (Pro-Admin.) 9.5%; ▌ ✓ Stephen Mix Mitchell (Pro-Admin.) 7.8%; ▌Uriah Tracy (Pro-Admin.) 6.3%; ▌Jonathan Ingersoll (Pro-Admin.) 5.4%; ▌Asher Miller (Unknown) 4.3%; ▌Zephaniah Swift (Pro-Admin.) 4.3%; ▌Tapping Reeve (Unknown) 3.0%
Connecticut at-large 7 seats on a general ticket	Jeremiah Wadsworth	Pro-Administration	1788	Incumbent re-elected.	▌ ✓ Jonathan Trumbull Jr. (Pro-Admin.) 14.1%; ▌ ✓ James Hillhouse (Pro-Admin.) 13.0%; ▌ ✓ Jonathan Sturges (Pro-Admin.) 11.5%; ▌ ✓ Benjamin Huntington (Pro-Admin.) 10.6%; ▌ ✓ Jeremiah Wadsworth (Pro-Admin.) 10.4%; ▌ ✓ Amasa Learned (Pro-Admin.) 9.5%; ▌ ✓ Stephen Mix Mitchell (Pro-Admin.) 7.8%; ▌Uriah Tracy (Pro-Admin.) 6.3%; ▌Jonathan Ingersoll (Pro-Admin.) 5.4%; ▌Asher Miller (Unknown) 4.3%; ▌Zephaniah Swift (Pro-Admin.) 4.3%; ▌Tapping Reeve (Unknown) 3.0%
Connecticut at-large 7 seats on a general ticket	None (new seat)			New seat. Pro-Administration gain.	▌ ✓ Jonathan Trumbull Jr. (Pro-Admin.) 14.1%; ▌ ✓ James Hillhouse (Pro-Admin.) 13.0%; ▌ ✓ Jonathan Sturges (Pro-Admin.) 11.5%; ▌ ✓ Benjamin Huntington (Pro-Admin.) 10.6%; ▌ ✓ Jeremiah Wadsworth (Pro-Admin.) 10.4%; ▌ ✓ Amasa Learned (Pro-Admin.) 9.5%; ▌ ✓ Stephen Mix Mitchell (Pro-Admin.) 7.8%; ▌Uriah Tracy (Pro-Admin.) 6.3%; ▌Jonathan Ingersoll (Pro-Admin.) 5.4%; ▌Asher Miller (Unknown) 4.3%; ▌Zephaniah Swift (Pro-Admin.) 4.3%; ▌Tapping Reeve (Unknown) 3.0%
Connecticut at-large 7 seats on a general ticket	None (new seat)			New seat. Pro-Administration gain.	▌ ✓ Jonathan Trumbull Jr. (Pro-Admin.) 14.1%; ▌ ✓ James Hillhouse (Pro-Admin.) 13.0%; ▌ ✓ Jonathan Sturges (Pro-Admin.) 11.5%; ▌ ✓ Benjamin Huntington (Pro-Admin.) 10.6%; ▌ ✓ Jeremiah Wadsworth (Pro-Admin.) 10.4%; ▌ ✓ Amasa Learned (Pro-Admin.) 9.5%; ▌ ✓ Stephen Mix Mitchell (Pro-Admin.) 7.8%; ▌Uriah Tracy (Pro-Admin.) 6.3%; ▌Jonathan Ingersoll (Pro-Admin.) 5.4%; ▌Asher Miller (Unknown) 4.3%; ▌Zephaniah Swift (Pro-Admin.) 4.3%; ▌Tapping Reeve (Unknown) 3.0%

Three special elections followed the 1792 elections in Connecticut after Representatives-elect Sturges and Huntington resigned before the start of Congress and Mitchell was elected to the Senate.

== Delaware ==
Delaware's apportionment did not change following the 1790 census. As in the 1st and 2nd Congresses, each voter cast votes for two separate candidates, at least one of whom had to be from a different county as the voter.

District	Incumbent			This race	
District	Member	Party	First elected	Results	Candidates
Delaware at-large	John Vining	Pro- Administration	1789	Incumbent lost re-election. Anti-Administration gain. Election was later challenged and overturned.	▌ ✓ John Patten (Anti-Admin.) 38.8%; ▌Henry Latimer (Pro-Admin.) 38.3%; ▌Francis Many (Unknown) 11.7%; ▌Edward Roche (Unknown) 7.9%; ▌Andrew Barrett (Unknown) 3.3%

== Georgia ==
Following the 1790 census, Georgia's apportionment was decreased from 3 seats to 2 (the only state whose representation decreased after the census). Georgia switched from separate districts to at-large seats.

District	Incumbent			This race	
District	Member	Party	First elected	Results	Candidates
Georgia at-large 2 seats on a general ticket	Abraham Baldwin; Redistricted from the 2nd district	Anti- Administration	1789	Incumbent re-elected.	▌ ✓ Abraham Baldwin (Anti-Admin.) 44.5%; ▌ ✓ Thomas P. Carnes (Anti-Admin.) 29.5%; ▌George Mathews (Pro-Admin.) 10.8%; ▌John Milledge (Anti-Admin.) 8.1%; ▌Francis Willis (Anti-Admin.) 0.3%; Scattering 7.0%
Georgia at-large 2 seats on a general ticket	John Milledge; Redistricted from the 1st district	Anti- Administration	1792 (special)	Incumbent lost re-election. Anti-Administration hold.	▌ ✓ Abraham Baldwin (Anti-Admin.) 44.5%; ▌ ✓ Thomas P. Carnes (Anti-Admin.) 29.5%; ▌George Mathews (Pro-Admin.) 10.8%; ▌John Milledge (Anti-Admin.) 8.1%; ▌Francis Willis (Anti-Admin.) 0.3%; Scattering 7.0%
Georgia at-large 2 seats on a general ticket	Francis Willis; Redistricted from the 3rd district	Anti- Administration	1791	Incumbent lost re-election. Anti-Administration loss.	▌ ✓ Abraham Baldwin (Anti-Admin.) 44.5%; ▌ ✓ Thomas P. Carnes (Anti-Admin.) 29.5%; ▌George Mathews (Pro-Admin.) 10.8%; ▌John Milledge (Anti-Admin.) 8.1%; ▌Francis Willis (Anti-Admin.) 0.3%; Scattering 7.0%

== Kentucky ==
District	Incumbent			This race	
District	Member	Party	First elected	Results	Candidates
Kentucky 1 "Southern district"	Christopher Greenup	Anti- Administration	1792 (new state)	Incumbent re-elected.	▌ ✓ Christopher Greenup (Anti-Admin.)
Kentucky 2 "Northern district"	Alexander D. Orr	Anti- Administration	1792 (new state)	Incumbent re-elected.	▌ ✓ Alexander D. Orr (Anti-Admin.)

== Maryland ==
Maryland increased from 6 to 8 representatives after the 1790 census. The previous mixed district/at-large system was replaced with a conventional district system.

District	Incumbent			This race	
District	Member	Party	First elected	Results	Candidates
Maryland 1	Philip Key	Pro- Administration	1790	Incumbent lost re-election. Pro-Administration hold.	▌ ✓ George Dent (Pro-Admin.) 44.7%; ▌John Parnham (Pro-Admin.) 29.8%; ▌Philip Key (Pro-Admin.) 25.5%
Maryland 2	John Francis Mercer; Redistricted from the 3rd district	Anti- Administration	1791 (special)	Incumbent re-elected.	▌ ✓ John Francis Mercer (Anti-Admin.) 57.0%; ▌John Thomas (Pro-Admin.) 42.1%; ▌Richard A. Contee (Unknown) 0.9%
Maryland 3	None (new district)			New seat. Pro-Administration gain.	▌ ✓ Uriah Forrest (Pro-Admin.) 71.8%; ▌William Dorsey (Anti-Admin.) 28.1%; Others 0.1%
Maryland 4	None (new district)			New seat. Anti-Administration gain.	▌ ✓ Thomas Sprigg (Anti-Admin.) 100%
Maryland 5	None (new district)			New seat. Anti-Administration gain.	▌ ✓ Samuel Smith (Anti-Admin.) 61.1%; ▌Charles Ridgely (Anti-Admin.) 38.9%
Maryland 6	None (new district)			New seat. Anti-Administration gain.	▌ ✓ Gabriel Christie (Anti-Admin.) 63.6%; ▌William Matthews (Pro-Admin.) 36.4%
Maryland 7	Joshua Seney; Redistricted from the 2nd district	Anti- Administration	1789	Incumbent retired. Pro-Administration gain. Incumbent resigned December 6, 1792 to become Chief Justice of Maryland's 3rd Judicial District. Winner was also elected to finish the term; see above.	▌ ✓ William Hindman (Pro-Admin.) 51.7%; ▌James Tilghman (Anti-Admin.) 48.3%
Maryland 8	William V. Murray; Redistricted from the 5th district	Pro- Administration	1790	Incumbent re-elected.	▌ ✓ William V. Murray (Pro-Admin.) 93.8%; ▌Littleton Dennis (Pro-Admin.) 5.4%; Others 0.9%

== Massachusetts ==
Following the 1790 census, Massachusetts's representation increased from eight to fourteen Representatives and was redistricted into four plural districts, plus a single at-large district. The 4th district covered the District of Maine (the modern-day State of Maine). The plural districts were concurrent tickets rather than a single general ticket, though the 1st and 2nd districts appeared to have also had a general ticket alongside the more specific tickets.

As before, a majority was required for election, in those districts where a majority was not achieved, additional ballots were required.

District	Incumbent			This race	
District	Member	Party	First elected	Results	Candidates
Massachusetts 1 (4 seats) Seat A: At-large	None (new district)			New seat. Anti-Administration gain.	First ballot (November 2, 1792): ▌Jonathan Jones (Unknown) 39.8%; ▌William Heath (Unknown) 31.0%; ▌James Bowdoin III (Unknown) 23.2%; ▌Theophilus Parsons (Unknown) 6.0%; Second ballot (January 14, 1793): ▌Jonathan Jones (Unknown) 29.3%; ▌Samuel Holten (Anti-Admin.) 25.6%; ▌James Bowdoin III (Unknown) 17.1%; ▌Samuel Sewall (Pro-Admin.) 13.1%; ▌William Heath (Unknown) 8.3%; ▌Joseph Bradley Varnum (Anti-Admin.) 3.8%; ▌Elbridge Gerry (Anti-Admin.) 2.8%; Third ballot (April 1, 1793): ▌ ✓ Samuel Holten (Anti-Admin.) 69.9%; ▌Benjamin Austin (Unknown) 30.1%
Massachusetts 1 (4 seats) Seat B: Essex County	Benjamin Goodhue; Redistricted from the 2nd district	Pro- Administration	1789	Incumbent re-elected.	▌ ✓ Benjamin Goodhue (Pro-Admin.) 100%
Massachusetts 1 (4 seats) Seat C: Middlesex County	Elbridge Gerry; Redistricted from the 3rd district	Anti- Administration	1789	Incumbent lost re-election. Pro-Administration gain.	▌ ✓ Samuel Dexter (Pro-Admin.) 61.4%; ▌Joseph Bradley Varnum (Anti-Admin.) 26.2%; ▌Elbridge Gerry (Anti-Admin.) 12.4%
Massachusetts 1 (4 seats) Seat D: Suffolk County	Fisher Ames	Pro- Administration	1788	Incumbent re-elected.	▌ ✓ Fisher Ames (Pro-Admin.) 62.4%; ▌Benjamin Austin (Unknown) 37.6%
Massachusetts 2 (4 seats) Seat A: At-large	None (new district)			New seat. Pro-Administration gain.	First ballot (November 2, 1792): ▌Samuel Lyman (Pro-Admin.) 41.3%; ▌Theodore Sedgwick (Pro-Admin.) 37.9%; ▌William Lyman (Anti-Admin.) 6.7%; ▌Samuel Moorhaus (Unknown) 6.2%; ▌Simeon Strong (Unknown) 4.0%; ▌Dwight Foster (Pro-Admin.) 3.5%; Second ballot (January 14, 1793): ▌Samuel Lyman (Pro-Admin.) 35.4%; ▌Dwight Foster (Pro-Admin.) 25.1%; ▌Thomson J. Skinner (Anti-Admin.) 19.6%; ▌William Lyman (Anti-Admin.) 12.1%; ▌Jonathan Grout (Anti-Admin.) 4.0%; ▌William Shepard (Pro-Admin.) 3.8%; Third ballot (April 1, 1793): ▌ ✓ Dwight Foster (Pro-Admin.) 55.3%; ▌Samuel Lyman (Pro-Admin.) 44.7%
Massachusetts 2 (4 seats) Seat B: Berkshire County	Theodore Sedgwick; Redistricted from the 4th district	Pro- Administration	1789	Incumbent re-elected.	▌ ✓ Theodore Sedgwick (Pro-Admin.) 63.8%; ▌Thomson J. Skinner (Anti-Admin.) 29.1%; ▌John Bacon (Anti-Admin.) 7.1%
Massachusetts 2 (4 seats) Seat C: Hampshire County	None (new district)			New seat. Anti-Administration gain.	First ballot (November 2, 1792): ▌Samuel Lyman (Pro-Admin.) 37.4%; ▌William Lyman (Anti-Admin.) 32.3%; ▌Thomas Dwight (Pro-Admin.) 16.8%; ▌Samuel Hinshaur (Unknown) 6.7%; ▌John Williams (Unknown) 3.6%; ▌Dwight Foster (Pro-Admin.) 3.1%; Second ballot (January 14, 1793): ▌William Lyman (Anti-Admin.) 38.0%; ▌Samuel Lyman (Pro-Admin.) 31.3%; ▌William Shepard (Pro-Admin.) 18.0%; ▌Thomas Dwight (Pro-Admin.) 12.7%; Third ballot (April 1, 1793): ▌ ✓ William Lyman (Anti-Admin.) 53.1%; ▌Samuel Lyman (Pro-Admin.) 46.9%
Massachusetts 2 (4 seats) Seat D: Worcester County	Artemas Ward; Redistricted from the 7th district	Pro- Administration	1790	Incumbent re-elected.	▌ ✓ Artemas Ward (Pro-Admin.) 59.5%; ▌Jonathan Grout (Anti-Admin.) 36.8%; ▌Dwight Foster (Pro-Admin.) 3.8%
Massachusetts 3 (2 seats) Seat A: Barnstable, Dukes, & Nantucket Counties	George Leonard; Redistricted from the 6th district	Pro- Administration	1788	Incumbent lost re-election. Pro-Administration hold.	▌ ✓ Peleg Coffin Jr. (Pro-Admin.) 52.6%; ▌George Leonard (Pro-Admin.) 34.3%; ▌Phanuel Bishop (Anti-Admin.) 13.1%
Massachusetts 3 (2 seats) Seat B: Bristol & Plymouth Counties	Shearjashub Bourne; Redistricted from the 5th district	Pro- Administration	1790	Incumbent re-elected.	First ballot (November 2, 1792): ▌John Davis (Pro-Admin.) 49.2%; ▌Shearjashub Bourne (Pro-Admin.) 26.1%; ▌James Warren (Unknown) 24.8%; Second ballot (January 14, 1793): ▌ ✓ Shearjashub Bourne (Pro-Admin.) 53.0%; ▌John Davis (Pro-Admin.) 40.6%; ▌James Warren (Unknown) 6.4%
Massachusetts 4 (3 seats) District of Maine Seat A: Cumberland County	None (new district)			New seat. Pro-Administration gain.	First ballot (November 2, 1792): ▌Daniel Davis (Unknown) 40.0%; ▌Peleg Wadsworth (Pro-Admin.) 38.6%; ▌Robert Southgate (Unknown) 11.7%; ▌Josiah Thacker (Unknown) 9.8%; Second ballot (January 14, 1793): ▌Peleg Wadsworth (Pro-Admin.) 48.4%; ▌Daniel Davis (Unknown) 42.2%; ▌Robert Southgate (Unknown) 9.4%; Third ballot (April 1, 1793): ▌ ✓ Peleg Wadsworth (Pro-Admin.) 58.0%; ▌Daniel Davis (Unknown) 42.0%
Massachusetts 4 (3 seats) District of Maine Seat B: Lincoln, Hancock, & Washington Counties	None (new district)			New seat. Anti-Administration gain.	First ballot (November 2, 1792): ▌William Lithgow (Unknown) 49.98%; ▌Henry Dearborn (Anti-Admin.) 32.2%; ▌Daniel Coney (Unknown) 11.8%; ▌Alan Campbell (Unknown) 6.0%; Second ballot (January 14, 1793): ▌ ✓ Henry Dearborn (Anti-Admin.) 60.9%; ▌William Lithgow (Unknown) 39.1%
Massachusetts 4 (3 seats) District of Maine Seat C: York County	George Thatcher; Redistricted from the 8th district	Pro- Administration	1788	Incumbent re-elected.	▌ ✓ George Thatcher (Pro-Admin.) 57.7%; ▌Nathaniel Wells (Pro-Admin.) 35.4%; ▌Tristan Jordan (Unknown) 6.9%
Massachusetts at-large	None (new district)			New seat. Pro-Administration gain.	▌ ✓ David Cobb (Pro-Admin.) 52.6%; ▌Charles Jarvis (Anti-Admin.) 9.6%; ▌William Heath (Unknown) 6.9%; ▌Theodore Sedgwick (Pro-Admin.) 4.9%; ▌Elbridge Gerry (Anti-Admin.) 2.1%; ▌Jonathan Jones (Unknown) 1.9%; ▌Fisher Ames (Pro-Admin.) 1.7%; ▌James Sullivan (Anti-Admin.) 1.5%; ▌Samuel Horton (Unknown) 1.3%; Scattering 17.4%

== New Hampshire ==
New Hampshire increased from 3 seats to 4 seats after the 1790 census.

District	Incumbent			This race	
District	Member	Party	First elected	Results	Candidates
New Hampshire at-large 4 seats on a general ticket	Jeremiah Smith	Pro-Administration	1790	Incumbent re-elected.	▌ ✓ Jeremiah Smith (Pro-Admin.) 24.1%; ▌ ✓ Nicholas Gilman (Pro-Admin.) 16.3%; ▌ ✓ John S. Sherburne (Anti-Admin.) 14.2%; ▌ ✓ Paine Wingate (Pro-Admin.) 12.2%; ▌Abiel Foster (Pro-Admin.) 8.9%; ▌James Sheafe (Pro-Admin.) 8.2%; ▌Nathaniel Peabody (Pro-Admin.) 7.7%; ▌Timothy Walker (Unknown) 4.0%; ▌William Page (Unknown) 2.3%; ▌Joshua Atherton (Unknown) 2.3%
New Hampshire at-large 4 seats on a general ticket	Samuel Livermore	Pro-Administration	1789	Incumbent retired. Anti-Administration gain.	▌ ✓ Jeremiah Smith (Pro-Admin.) 24.1%; ▌ ✓ Nicholas Gilman (Pro-Admin.) 16.3%; ▌ ✓ John S. Sherburne (Anti-Admin.) 14.2%; ▌ ✓ Paine Wingate (Pro-Admin.) 12.2%; ▌Abiel Foster (Pro-Admin.) 8.9%; ▌James Sheafe (Pro-Admin.) 8.2%; ▌Nathaniel Peabody (Pro-Admin.) 7.7%; ▌Timothy Walker (Unknown) 4.0%; ▌William Page (Unknown) 2.3%; ▌Joshua Atherton (Unknown) 2.3%
New Hampshire at-large 4 seats on a general ticket	Nicholas Gilman	Pro-Administration	1789	Incumbent re-elected.	▌ ✓ Jeremiah Smith (Pro-Admin.) 24.1%; ▌ ✓ Nicholas Gilman (Pro-Admin.) 16.3%; ▌ ✓ John S. Sherburne (Anti-Admin.) 14.2%; ▌ ✓ Paine Wingate (Pro-Admin.) 12.2%; ▌Abiel Foster (Pro-Admin.) 8.9%; ▌James Sheafe (Pro-Admin.) 8.2%; ▌Nathaniel Peabody (Pro-Admin.) 7.7%; ▌Timothy Walker (Unknown) 4.0%; ▌William Page (Unknown) 2.3%; ▌Joshua Atherton (Unknown) 2.3%
New Hampshire at-large 4 seats on a general ticket	None (new seat)			New seat. Pro-Administration gain.	▌ ✓ Jeremiah Smith (Pro-Admin.) 24.1%; ▌ ✓ Nicholas Gilman (Pro-Admin.) 16.3%; ▌ ✓ John S. Sherburne (Anti-Admin.) 14.2%; ▌ ✓ Paine Wingate (Pro-Admin.) 12.2%; ▌Abiel Foster (Pro-Admin.) 8.9%; ▌James Sheafe (Pro-Admin.) 8.2%; ▌Nathaniel Peabody (Pro-Admin.) 7.7%; ▌Timothy Walker (Unknown) 4.0%; ▌William Page (Unknown) 2.3%; ▌Joshua Atherton (Unknown) 2.3%

== New Jersey ==
Following the 1790 census, New Jersey's apportionment increased from 4 to 5 seats.

District	Incumbent			This race	
District	Member	Party	First elected	Results	Candidates (Note: Only candidates with at least 1% of the vote listed.)
New Jersey at-large 5 seats on a general ticket	Elias Boudinot	Pro-Administration	1789	Incumbent re-elected.	▌ ✓ John Beatty (Pro-Admin.) 16.4%; ▌ ✓ Jonathan Dayton (Pro-Admin.) 13.4%; ▌ ✓ Abraham Clark (Pro-Admin.) 11.8%; ▌ ✓ Elias Boudinot (Pro-Admin.) 10.8%; ▌ ✓ Lambert Cadwalader (Pro-Admin.) 10.1%; ▌Thomas Sinnickson (Pro-Admin.) 8.7%; ▌Aaron Kitchell (Pro-Admin.) 8.6%; ▌James Linn (Anti-Admin.) 5.2%; ▌Jonathan Elmer (Pro-Admin.) 4.4%; ▌Samuel Dick (Unknown) 4.1%; ▌Thomas Henderson (Unknown) 2.9%
New Jersey at-large 5 seats on a general ticket	Abraham Clark	Pro-Administration	1791	Incumbent re-elected.	▌ ✓ John Beatty (Pro-Admin.) 16.4%; ▌ ✓ Jonathan Dayton (Pro-Admin.) 13.4%; ▌ ✓ Abraham Clark (Pro-Admin.) 11.8%; ▌ ✓ Elias Boudinot (Pro-Admin.) 10.8%; ▌ ✓ Lambert Cadwalader (Pro-Admin.) 10.1%; ▌Thomas Sinnickson (Pro-Admin.) 8.7%; ▌Aaron Kitchell (Pro-Admin.) 8.6%; ▌James Linn (Anti-Admin.) 5.2%; ▌Jonathan Elmer (Pro-Admin.) 4.4%; ▌Samuel Dick (Unknown) 4.1%; ▌Thomas Henderson (Unknown) 2.9%
New Jersey at-large 5 seats on a general ticket	Jonathan Dayton	Pro-Administration	1791	Incumbent re-elected.	▌ ✓ John Beatty (Pro-Admin.) 16.4%; ▌ ✓ Jonathan Dayton (Pro-Admin.) 13.4%; ▌ ✓ Abraham Clark (Pro-Admin.) 11.8%; ▌ ✓ Elias Boudinot (Pro-Admin.) 10.8%; ▌ ✓ Lambert Cadwalader (Pro-Admin.) 10.1%; ▌Thomas Sinnickson (Pro-Admin.) 8.7%; ▌Aaron Kitchell (Pro-Admin.) 8.6%; ▌James Linn (Anti-Admin.) 5.2%; ▌Jonathan Elmer (Pro-Admin.) 4.4%; ▌Samuel Dick (Unknown) 4.1%; ▌Thomas Henderson (Unknown) 2.9%
New Jersey at-large 5 seats on a general ticket	Aaron Kitchell	Pro-Administration	1791	Incumbent lost re-election. Pro-Administration hold.	▌ ✓ John Beatty (Pro-Admin.) 16.4%; ▌ ✓ Jonathan Dayton (Pro-Admin.) 13.4%; ▌ ✓ Abraham Clark (Pro-Admin.) 11.8%; ▌ ✓ Elias Boudinot (Pro-Admin.) 10.8%; ▌ ✓ Lambert Cadwalader (Pro-Admin.) 10.1%; ▌Thomas Sinnickson (Pro-Admin.) 8.7%; ▌Aaron Kitchell (Pro-Admin.) 8.6%; ▌James Linn (Anti-Admin.) 5.2%; ▌Jonathan Elmer (Pro-Admin.) 4.4%; ▌Samuel Dick (Unknown) 4.1%; ▌Thomas Henderson (Unknown) 2.9%
New Jersey at-large 5 seats on a general ticket	None (new seat)			New seat. Pro-Administration gain.	▌ ✓ John Beatty (Pro-Admin.) 16.4%; ▌ ✓ Jonathan Dayton (Pro-Admin.) 13.4%; ▌ ✓ Abraham Clark (Pro-Admin.) 11.8%; ▌ ✓ Elias Boudinot (Pro-Admin.) 10.8%; ▌ ✓ Lambert Cadwalader (Pro-Admin.) 10.1%; ▌Thomas Sinnickson (Pro-Admin.) 8.7%; ▌Aaron Kitchell (Pro-Admin.) 8.6%; ▌James Linn (Anti-Admin.) 5.2%; ▌Jonathan Elmer (Pro-Admin.) 4.4%; ▌Samuel Dick (Unknown) 4.1%; ▌Thomas Henderson (Unknown) 2.9%

== New York ==
Due to re-apportionment following the 1790 census, New York's congressional delegation grew from 6 to 10. Three incumbents ran for re-election, two of whom won, and the other three incumbents retired. With the increase following re-apportionment, this left seven open seats.

District	Incumbent			This race	
District	Member	Party	First elected	Results	Candidates
New York 1	Thomas Tredwell	Anti- Administration	1791 (Special)	Incumbent re-elected.	▌ ✓ Thomas Tredwell (Anti-Admin.) 50.1%; ▌Joshua Sands (Pro-Admin.) 26.6%; ▌Harry Peters (Pro-Admin.) 23.3%
New York 2	None (new district)			New seat. Pro-Administration gain.	▌ ✓ John Watts (Pro-Admin.) 72.6%; ▌William S. Livingston (Anti-Admin.) 27.3%
New York 3	None (new district)			New seat. Anti-Administration gain.	▌ ✓ Philip Van Cortlandt (Anti-Admin.) 55.5%; ▌Richard Hatfield (Pro-Admin.) 44.5%
New York 4	Cornelius C. Schoonmaker	Anti- Administration	1790	Incumbent lost re-election. Pro-Administration gain.	▌ ✓ Peter Van Gaasbeck (Pro-Admin.) 47.3%; ▌John Hathorn (Anti-Admin.) 46.8%; ▌John Carpenter (Anti-Admin.) 2.3%; ▌Cornelius C. Schoonmaker (Anti-Admin.) 1.7%; ▌William Thompson (Anti-Admin.) 1.3%; ▌Jesse Woodhull (Anti-Admin.) 0.6%
New York 5	None (new district)			New seat. Anti-Administration gain.	▌ ✓ Theodorus Bailey (Anti-Admin.) 53.6%; ▌James Kent (Pro-Admin.) 46.4%
New York 6	None (new district)			New seat. Pro-Administration gain.	▌ ✓ Ezekiel Gilbert (Pro-Admin.) 35.1%; ▌Peter R. Livingston (Anti-Admin.) 34.1%; ▌Peter Van Ness (Anti-Admin.) 30.8%
New York 7	None (new district)			New seat. Pro-Administration gain.	▌ ✓ John Evert Van Alen (Pro-Admin.) 56.9%; ▌Henry K. Van Rensselaer (Anti-Admin.) 42.5%; ▌Thomas Sickles (Anti-Admin.) 0.6%
New York 8	None (new district)			New seat. Pro-Administration gain.	▌ ✓ Henry Glen (Pro-Admin.) 63.8%; ▌Jeremiah Van Rensselaer (Anti-Admin.) 36.2%
New York 9	James Gordon; Redistricted from the 6th district	Pro- Administration	1790	Incumbent re-elected.	▌ ✓ James Gordon (Pro-Admin.) 46.0%; ▌John Williams (Anti-Admin.) 41.2%; ▌John M. Thompson (Anti-Admin.) 12.8%
New York 10	None (new district)			New seat. Pro-Administration gain.	▌ ✓ Silas Talbot (Pro-Admin.) 34.1%; ▌William Cooper (Pro-Admin.) 26.6%; ▌John Winn (Anti-Admin.) 25.7%; ▌Andrew Fink (Anti-Admin.) 11.3%; ▌Josiah Crane (Anti-Admin.) 2.4%

== North Carolina ==
Following the 1790 census, North Carolina's apportionment increased from 5 to 10 seats.

District	Incumbent			This race	
District	Member	Party	First elected	Results	Candidates
North Carolina 1	None (new district)			New seat. Anti-Administration gain.	▌ ✓ Joseph McDowell (Anti-Admin.) 100%
North Carolina 2	None (new district)			New seat. Anti-Administration gain.	▌ ✓ Matthew Locke (Anti-Admin.); ▌Alexander (Note: Source does not give full name.) (Pro-Admin.); ▌Montford Stokes (Unknown)
North Carolina 3	None (new district)			New seat. Anti-Administration gain.	▌ ✓ Joseph Winston (Anti-Admin.); ▌Jesse Franklin (Anti-Admin.); ▌John Williams (Anti-Admin.); ▌James Martin (Unknown); ▌Clarke (Unknown)
North Carolina 4	None (new district)			New seat. Anti-Administration gain.	▌ ✓ Alexander Mebane (Anti-Admin.) 44.8%; ▌Stephen Moore (Pro-Admin.) 39.0%; ▌Ambrose Ramsey (Pro-Admin.) 16.2%
North Carolina 5	Nathaniel Macon; Redistricted from the 2nd district	Anti- Administration	1791	Incumbent re-elected.	▌ ✓ Nathaniel Macon (Anti-Admin.) 100%
North Carolina 6	None (new district)			New seat. Anti-Administration gain.	▌ ✓ James Gillespie (Anti-Admin.); ▌William Henry Hill (Pro-Admin.); ▌Benjamin Smith (Unknown)
North Carolina 7	William B. Grove; Redistricted from the 5th district	Pro- Administration	1791	Incumbent re-elected.	▌ ✓ William B. Grove (Pro-Admin.) 100%
North Carolina 8	None (new district)			New seat. Anti-Administration gain.	▌ ✓ William J. Dawson (Anti-Admin.) 63.8%; ▌Stephen Cabarrus (Anti-Admin.) 36.1%; ▌William Cumming (Unknown) 0.2%
North Carolina 9	John B. Ashe; Redistricted from the 3rd district	Anti- Administration	1790	Incumbent lost re-election. Anti-Administration hold.	▌ ✓ Thomas Blount (Anti-Admin.); ▌John B. Ashe (Anti-Admin.); ▌John Leigh (Pro-Admin.)
North Carolina 10	None (new district)			New seat. Anti-Administration gain.	▌ ✓ Benjamin Williams (Anti-Admin.); ▌William Maclure (Anti-Admin.)

== Pennsylvania ==
Pennsylvania switched from using districts to electing its representatives on an at-large basis for the 3rd Congress, just as it had done for the 1st Congress. This would be the last time that Pennsylvania would elect all of its Representatives at-large. Due to re-apportionment following the 1790 census, Pennsylvania's delegation increased from 8 representatives to 13.

District	Incumbent			This race	
District	Member	Party	First elected	Results	Candidates
Pennsylvania at-large 13 seats on a general ticket	Thomas Fitzsimons; Redistricted from the 1st district	Pro- Administration	1788	Incumbent re-elected.	▌ ✓ William Findley (Anti-Admin.) 8.21%; ▌ ✓ Frederick Muhlenberg (Anti-Admin.) 8.01%; ▌ ✓ Daniel Hiester (Anti-Admin.) 7.96%; ▌ ✓ William Irvine (Anti-Admin.) 7.67%; ▌ ✓ John W. Kittera (Pro-Admin.) 7.39%; ▌ ✓ Thomas Hartley (Pro-Admin.) 7.06%; ▌ ✓ Peter Muhlenberg (Anti-Admin.) 5.40%; ▌ ✓ Thomas Fitzsimons (Pro-Admin.) 4.46%; ▌ ✓ Andrew Gregg (Anti-Admin.) 4.30%; ▌ ✓ James Armstrong (Pro-Admin.) 4.29%; ▌ ✓ William Montgomery (Anti-Admin.) 4.22%; ▌ ✓ John Smilie (Anti-Admin.) 4.15%; ▌ ✓ Thomas Scott (Pro-Admin.) 4.13%; ▌Samuel Sitgreaves (Pro-Admin.) 3.86%; ▌Jonathan D. Sergeant (Anti-Admin.) 3.74%; ▌John Barclay (Anti-Admin.) 3.70%; ▌Charles Thomson (Anti-Admin.) 3.68%; ▌William Bingham (Pro-Admin.) 3.59%; ▌Henry Wynkoop (Pro-Admin.) 3.55%; ▌Israel Jacobs (Pro-Admin.) 0.65%
Pennsylvania at-large 13 seats on a general ticket	Frederick Muhlenberg; Redistricted from the 2nd district	Anti- Administration	1788	Incumbent re-elected.	
Pennsylvania at-large 13 seats on a general ticket	Israel Jacobs; Redistricted from the 3rd district	Pro- Administration	1791	Incumbent lost re-election. Pro-Administration hold.	
Pennsylvania at-large 13 seats on a general ticket	Daniel Hiester; Redistricted from the 4th district	Anti- Administration	1788	Incumbent re-elected.	
Pennsylvania at-large 13 seats on a general ticket	John W. Kittera; Redistricted from the 5th district	Pro- Administration	1791	Incumbent re-elected.	
Pennsylvania at-large 13 seats on a general ticket	Andrew Gregg; Redistricted from the 6th district	Anti- Administration	1791	Incumbent re-elected.	
Pennsylvania at-large 13 seats on a general ticket	Thomas Hartley; Redistricted from the 7th district	Pro- Administration	1788	Incumbent re-elected.	
Pennsylvania at-large 13 seats on a general ticket	William Findley; Redistricted from the 8th district	Anti- Administration	1791	Incumbent re-elected.	
Pennsylvania at-large 13 seats on a general ticket	None (new seat)			New seat. Pro-Administration gain.	
Pennsylvania at-large 13 seats on a general ticket	None (new seat)			New seat. Anti-Administration gain.	
Pennsylvania at-large 13 seats on a general ticket	None (new seat)			New seat. Anti-Administration gain.	
Pennsylvania at-large 13 seats on a general ticket	None (new seat)			New seat. Anti-Administration gain.	
Pennsylvania at-large 13 seats on a general ticket	None (new seat)			New seat. Anti-Administration gain.	

== Rhode Island ==
Rhode Island gained a second representative from the results of the 1790 census. Rhode Island did not divide itself into districts, but elected two at-large representatives.

District	Incumbent			This race	
District	Member	Party	First elected	Results	Candidates
Rhode Island at-large 2 seats elected at-large on a general ticket	Benjamin Bourne	Pro-Administration	1790	Incumbent re-elected.	▌ ✓ Benjamin Bourne (Pro-Admin.) 100%; ▌ ✓ Francis Malbone (Pro-Admin.) (Note: Numbers of votes missing or incomplete in source.); ▌Paul Mumford (Unknown)
Rhode Island at-large 2 seats elected at-large on a general ticket	None (new seat)			New seat. Pro-Administration gain.	▌ ✓ Benjamin Bourne (Pro-Admin.) 100%; ▌ ✓ Francis Malbone (Pro-Admin.); ▌Paul Mumford (Unknown)

== South Carolina ==
South Carolina gained one representative as a result of the 1790 census, increasing from 5 to 6.

District	Incumbent			This race	
District	Member	Party	First elected	Results	Candidates
South Carolina 1	William L. Smith	Pro-Administration	1788	Incumbent re-elected.	▌ ✓ William L. Smith (Pro-Admin.) 61.5%; ▌Thomas Tudor Tucker (Anti-Admin.) 22.2%; ▌Jacob Read (Pro-Admin.) 16.4%
South Carolina 1	Thomas Tudor Tucker; Redistricted from the 5th district	Anti-Administration	1788	Incumbent lost re-election. Anti-Administration loss.	▌ ✓ William L. Smith (Pro-Admin.) 61.5%; ▌Thomas Tudor Tucker (Anti-Admin.) 22.2%; ▌Jacob Read (Pro-Admin.) 16.4%
South Carolina 2	None (new district)			New seat. Anti-Administration gain.	▌ ✓ John Hunter (Anti-Admin.)
South Carolina 3	None (new district)			New seat. Anti-Administration gain.	▌ ✓ Lemuel Benton (Anti-Admin.)
South Carolina 4	None (new district)			New seat. Anti-Administration gain.	▌ ✓ Richard Winn (Anti-Admin.)
South Carolina 5	None (new district)			New seat. Anti-Administration gain.	▌ ✓ Alexander Gillon (Anti-Admin.)
South Carolina 6	None (new district)			New seat. Anti-Administration gain.	▌ ✓ Andrew Pickens (Anti-Admin.)

== Vermont ==
Vermont had no apportionment in the House of Representatives before 1790 census because it was not admitted to the Union until 1791. Vermont's election laws at the time required a majority to win election to the House of Representatives. If no candidate won a majority, a runoff election was held, which happened in the 1st district.

District	Incumbent			This race	
District	Member	Party	First elected	Results	Candidates
Vermont 1 "Western district"	Israel Smith	Anti- Administration	1791	Incumbent re-elected.	First ballot (January 7, 1793): ▌Israel Smith (Anti-Admin.) 44.2%; ▌Matthew Lyon (Anti-Admin.) 33.8%; ▌Isaac Tichenor (Pro-Admin.) 17.8%; ▌Samuel Hitchcock (Unknown) 4.2%; Second ballot (March 20, 1793): ▌ ✓ Israel Smith (Anti-Admin.) 51.0%; ▌Matthew Lyon (Anti-Admin.) 44.0%; ▌Isaac Tichenor (Pro-Admin.) 4.3%; ▌Samuel Hitchcock (Unknown) 0.6%; Others (Note: Four individuals received 1 vote each.) 0.1%
Vermont 2 "Eastern district"	Nathaniel Niles	Anti- Administration	1791	Incumbent re-elected.	▌ ✓ Nathaniel Niles (Anti-Admin.) 60.3%; ▌Elijah Paine (Pro-Admin.) 14.0%; ▌Stephen Jacob (Unknown) 7.7%; ▌Paul Brigham (Anti-Admin.) 4.4%; ▌Samuel Cutler (Unknown) 3.9%; ▌Daniel Buck (Pro-Admin.) 3.5%; ▌Isaac Tichenor (Pro-Admin.) 2.2%; Others 4.0%

== Virginia ==
Virginia gained nine representatives from the 1790 census, and in addition, the old 2nd district was lost after its territory became the new State of Kentucky. There were, therefore, ten new districts created for the 3rd Congress.

District	Incumbent			This race	
District	Member	Party	First elected	Results	Candidates
Virginia 1	Alexander White	Pro- Administration	1789	Incumbent lost re-election. Anti-Administration gain.	▌ ✓ Robert Rutherford (Anti-Admin.) 56.6%; ▌John Smith (Anti-Admin.) 25.8%; ▌Alexander White (Pro-Admin.) 17.6%
Virginia 2	Andrew Moore; Redistricted from the 3rd district	Anti- Administration	1789	Incumbent re-elected.	▌ ✓ Andrew Moore (Anti-Admin.) 100%
Virginia 3	None (new district)			New seat. Anti-Administration gain.	▌ ✓ Joseph Neville (Anti-Admin.); ▌George Jackson (Anti-Admin.); ▌Jeremiah Jacobs (Unknown); ▌William MacCleery (Unknown)
Virginia 4	None (new district)			New seat. Anti-Administration gain. Results subsequently challenged but upheld.	▌ ✓ Francis Preston (Anti-Admin.); ▌Abram Trigg (Unknown)
Virginia 5	None (new district)			New seat. Pro-Administration gain.	▌ ✓ George Hancock (Pro-Admin.) 60.5%; ▌Charles Clay (Anti-Admin.) 34.0%; ▌Calohill Minnis (Anti-Admin.) 5.5%
Virginia 6	None (new district)			New seat. Anti-Administration gain.	▌ ✓ Isaac Coles (Anti-Admin.) 100%
Virginia 7	Abraham B. Venable; Redistricted from the 6th district	Anti- Administration	1790	Incumbent re-elected.	▌ ✓ Abraham B. Venable (Anti-Admin.) 79.2%; ▌Joseph Wyatt (Unknown) 12.1%; ▌Thomas Scott (Pro-Admin.) 8.3%; ▌Tarlton Woodson (Pro-Admin.) 0.4%
Virginia 8	None (new district)			New seat. Anti-Administration gain.	▌ ✓ Thomas Claiborne (Anti-Admin.); ▌Richard Kennon (Unknown); ▌Jesse Brown (Unknown); ▌J. Nicholson (Unknown)
Virginia 9	William B. Giles	Anti- Administration	1790	Incumbent re-elected.	▌ ✓ William B. Giles (Anti-Admin.); ▌Robert Bolling (Unknown)
Virginia 10	None (new district)			New seat. Anti-Administration gain.	▌ ✓ Carter B. Harrison (Anti-Admin.); ▌John H. Briggs (Unknown)
Virginia 11	Josiah Parker; Redistricted from the 8th district	Anti- Administration	1789	Incumbent re-elected as Pro-Administration. Pro-Administration gain.	▌ ✓ Josiah Parker (Pro-Admin.) (Note: Had been Anti-Administration in the previous election.); ▌John Neirson (Unknown)
Virginia 12	John Page; Redistricted from the 7th district	Anti- Administration	1789	Incumbent re-elected.	▌ ✓ John Page (Anti-Admin.) 100%
Virginia 13	Samuel Griffin; Redistricted from the 10th district	Anti- Administration	1789	Incumbent re-elected as Pro-Administration. Pro-Administration gain.	▌ ✓ Samuel Griffin (Pro-Admin.) 100%
Virginia 14	None (new district)			New seat. Anti-Administration gain.	▌ ✓ Francis Walker (Anti-Admin.) 100%
Virginia 15	James Madison; Redistricted from the 5th district	Anti- Administration	1789	Incumbent re-elected.	▌ ✓ James Madison (Anti-Admin.) 64.7%
Virginia 16	None (new district)			New seat. Anti-Administration gain.	▌ ✓ Anthony New (Anti-Admin.); ▌John Roane (Anti-Admin.); ▌Francis Corbin (Unknown)
Virginia 17	Richard Bland Lee; Redistricted from the 4th district	Pro- Administration	1789	Incumbent re-elected.	▌ ✓ Richard Bland Lee (Pro-Admin.) 100%
Virginia 18	None (new district)			New seat. Anti-Administration gain.	▌ ✓ John Nicholas (Anti-Admin.); ▌William Pickett (Unknown)
Virginia 19	None (new district)			New seat. Anti-Administration gain.	▌ ✓ John Heath (Anti-Admin.); ▌Walter Jones (Anti-Admin.); ▌Francis L. Lee (Unknown)

== See also ==
- 1792 United States elections
  - List of United States House of Representatives elections (1789–1822)
  - 1792–93 United States Senate elections
  - 1792 United States presidential election
- 2nd United States Congress
- 3rd United States Congress

== Bibliography ==
- "A New Nation Votes: American Election Returns 1787-1825". Tufts Digital Library, Tufts University. Archived from the original on January 29, 2015.
- Dubin, Michael J. (March 1, 1998). 1788 United States Congressional Elections-1997: The Official Results of the Elections of the 1st Through 105th Congresses. McFarland and Company. ISBN 978-0786402830.
- Martis, Kenneth C. (January 1, 1989). The Historical Atlas of Political Parties in the United States Congress, 1789-1989. Macmillan Publishing Company. ISBN 978-0029201701.
- "Party Divisions of the House of Representatives* 1789–Present". Office of the Historian, United States House of Representatives.
- Mapping Early American Elections project team (2019). "Mapping Early American Elections". Roy Rosenzweig Center for History and New Media, George Mason University.
