= Sam Sullivan (disambiguation) =

Sam Sullivan is a Canadian politician.

Sam or Samuel Sullivan may also refer to:

- Sam Sullivan (The 5th Wave), fictional character in The 5th Wave
- Samuel Sullivan (Heroes), fictional character in Heroes
- Samuel Sullivan (politician), Ohio politician
