= 1792 United States House of Representatives elections in Kentucky =

| District | Incumbent | Party | First elected | Result | Candidates |
|---|---|---|---|---|---|
| Kentucky 1 "Southern District" | Kentucky admitted June 1, 1792. | | | New member elected September 7, 1792. Anti-Administration gain. Winner seated November 9, 1792. Winner was later re-elected to the next term, see below. | Christopher Greenup (Anti-Administration); Robert Breckinridge |
| Kentucky 2 "Northern District" | Kentucky admitted June 1, 1792. | | | New member elected September 7, 1792. Anti-Administration gain. Winner seated November 8, 1792. Winner was later re-elected to the next term, see below. | Alexander D. Orr (Anti-Administration); Hubbard Taylor |

== See also ==
- United States House of Representatives elections, 1792 and 1793
- List of United States representatives from Kentucky
