= J. Vaughan Gary =

American politician (1892–1973)

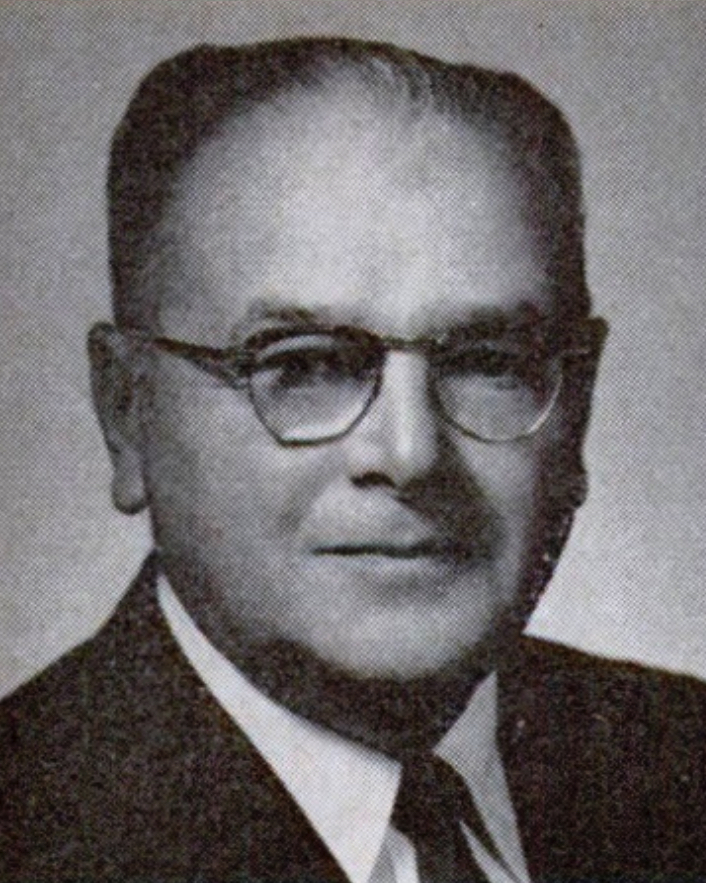
- J. Vaughan Gary, c. 1963

Member of the U.S. House of Representatives from Virginia's 3rd district
- In office March 6, 1945 – January 3, 1965
- Preceded by: Dave E. Satterfield Jr.
- Succeeded by: David E. Satterfield III

Member of the Virginia House of Delegates from Richmond City
- In office January 13, 1926 – January 10, 1934
- Preceded by: Charles W. Crowder
- Succeeded by: Horace H. Edwards

Personal details
- Born: Julian Vaughan Gary; February 25, 1892 Richmond, Virginia, U.S.
- Died: September 6, 1973 (aged 81) Richmond, Virginia, U.S.
- Party: Democratic
- Education: University of Richmond (BA, LLB)
- Occupation: Lawyer; politician

Military service
- Branch/service: United States Army
- Battles/wars: World War I

Julian Vaughan Gary (February 25, 1892 – September 6, 1973) was a U.S. representative from Virginia.

== Biography ==
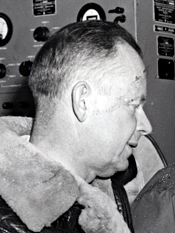
in 1952

Born in Richmond, Virginia, Gary was a graduate of the University of Richmond (B.A., 1912, LL.B., 1915). He was admitted to the bar in 1915 and commenced practice in Richmond, Virginia. Gary served in the United States Army during World War I, and subsequently served as counsel and executive assistant of the Virginia tax board from 1919 to 1924. From 1926 to 1933, Gary served in the Virginia House of Delegates. Gary also served as a member of the board of trustees of the University of Richmond.

Gary was elected as a Democrat to the Seventy-ninth Congress by special election, March 6, 1945, to fill the vacancy caused by the resignation of Dave E. Satterfield, Jr. He was reelected to the nine succeeding Congresses and served from March 6, 1945, to January 3, 1965, during which time he was a signatory to the 1956 Southern Manifesto that opposed the desegregation of public schools ordered by the Supreme Court in Brown v. Board of Education. He was not a candidate for renomination in 1964 to the Eighty-ninth Congress, and he subsequently resumed this private law practice in Richmond. Upon his retirement, Gary continued to reside in Richmond, where he died September 6, 1973. He is buried in Hollywood Cemetery.

== Electoral history ==
- 1945; Gary was elected to the U.S. House of Representatives with 48.55% of the vote, defeating fellow Democrat Ashton Dovell and Republican Curtis M. dozier.
- 1946; Re-elected with 73.35% of the vote, defeating Republican Earle Lutz.
- 1948; Re-elected with 72.94% of the vote, defeating Republican Richard C. Poage, Independent David P. Bennett, and Socialist Mary D. Fleet.
- 1950; Re-elected with 89.73% of the vote, defeating Independent Phronia A. McNeill and Social Democrat Kathryn Bernstein.
- 1952; Re-elected with 57.67% of the vote, defeating Republican Walter R. Gambill.
- 1954; Re-elected with 58.01% of the vote, defeating Republican J. Calvitt Clarke.
- 1956; Re-elected with 59.07% of the vote, defeating Republican Royal E. Cabell.
- 1958; Re-elected with 76.14% of the vote, defeating Republican Richard R. Ryder.
- 1960; Re-elected with 78.02% of the vote, defeating Independent Thomas Coleman Andrews, Jr.
- 1962; Re-elected with 49.8% of the vote, defeating Republican Louis H. Williams and Independent Alfred T. Dudley.

== Sources ==
- United States Congress. "J. Vaughan Gary (id: G000091)". Biographical Directory of the United States Congress.

U.S. House of Representatives
Preceded by Dave E. Satterfield, Jr.	Member of the U.S. House of Representatives from Virginia's 3rd congressional district 1945–1965	Succeeded by David E. Satterfield III
