= 1792 Georgia's 1st congressional district special election =

A special election was held in Georgia's 1st congressional district on July 9, 1792, to fill a vacancy caused by the House Committee on Elections finding on March 21, 1792, that electoral fraud had been involved in Anthony Wayne's election in 1791. His election was declared void and he was removed from the House.

== Election results ==
Candidate	Party	Votes	Percent
John Milledge	Anti-Administration	254	55.2%
Matthew McAllister	Pro-Administration	205	44.6%
John Glen		1	0.4%

Milledge took his seat on November 22, 1792

== See also ==
- 1792 and 1793 United States House of Representatives elections
- List of United States representatives from Georgia
