= David E. Satterfield III =

American politician (1920–1988)

Dave Satterfield
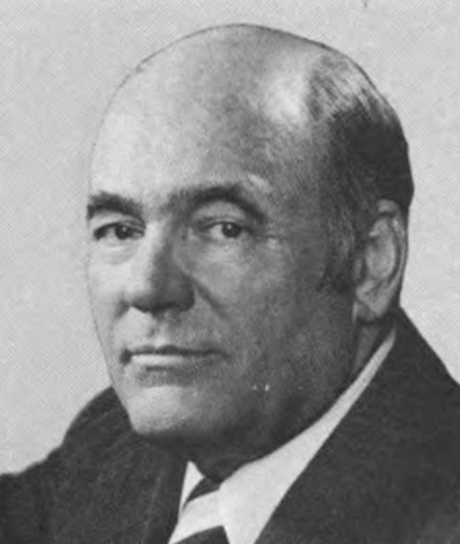

Member of the U.S. House of Representatives from Virginia's 3rd district
- In office January 3, 1965 – January 3, 1981
- Preceded by: J. Vaughan Gary
- Succeeded by: Thomas J. Bliley Jr.

Member of the Virginia House of Delegates from Richmond City
- In office January 13, 1960 – January 8, 1964
- Preceded by: FitzGerald Bemiss
- Succeeded by: Strother Smith

Personal details
- Born: David Edward Satterfield III; December 2, 1920 Richmond, Virginia, U.S.
- Died: September 30, 1988 (aged 67) Richmond, Virginia, U.S.
- Party: Democratic
- Spouse: Annie Powell
- Relatives: Dave E. Satterfield Jr. (father)
- Education: University of Richmond (BA); University of Virginia (LLB)

Military service
- Branch/service: United States Navy
- Years of service: 1940–1945
- Rank: Commander
- Unit: Naval Reserve
- Battles/wars: World War II

David Edward Satterfield III (December 2, 1920 – September 30, 1988) was an American lawyer and Democratic politician who served for eight consecutive terms as the U.S. representative from Virginia's 3rd congressional district (1965–1981). His father, Dave E. Satterfield, Jr., served in the House of Representatives from 1937–1945.

== Early and family life ==
Born in Richmond, Virginia, Satterfield was educated in the then-segregated Richmond Public Schools and at private, all-boys St. Christopher's School in Richmond. He then attended the University of Richmond and law school at the University of Virginia Law School in Charlottesville, Virginia. He married Annie E. Powell.

== Military service ==
During World War II, while his father served in the U.S. House of Representatives, Satterfield volunteered for military service and became a fighter pilot with the United States Navy. Following the war, he used the GI Bill to complete his education, and continued in the Naval Air Reserve, rising to the rank of commander.

== Career ==
After admission to the Virginia bar in 1948 and a brief stint in private practice, Satterfield served as an assistant United States attorney from 1950–1953. As the state's Massive Resistance crisis began following the United States Supreme Court decisions in Brown v. Board of Education and its allied cases (including one from Virginia), Satterfield resigned his federal job and resumed private legal practice.

Satterfield then followed his late father's career with the Democratic party and won his first elective office, to the (then-all-at-large) Richmond City Council, where he served from 1954–1956. Satterfield then won election to the Virginia House of Delegates, serving from 1960–1964. That was (and remains) a part-time position, and he in a way succeeded fellow Navy veteran and St. Christopher's School alumnus FitzGerald Bemiss in the then multi-member district.

Satterfield ran for Congress in the Richmond-based 3rd District in 1964 after 20-year incumbent J. Vaughan Gary retired. Satterfield defeated Republican Richard Obenshain, who would later go on to become state party chairman, by only 654 votes. Obenshain nearly won on the strength of Barry Goldwater carrying the district; Goldwater won every county-level jurisdiction in the district except for the city of Richmond. This was the second straight contest in which the Republicans nearly ended the long run of Democratic dominance in the district; two years earlier Gary had only survived by 348 votes.

The district reverted to form, and Satterfield was reelected seven more times without serious difficulty, despite the collapse of the Byrd Organization, running unopposed in 1966 and 1972 and only facing an independent in 1976 and 1978. This came even in years when Republican presidential candidates carried the district handily. However, he decided not to seek re-election in 1980, and concentrated on his legal practice in Washington, D.C., Arlington, Virginia, and Richmond, where he continued to reside until his death in 1988.

== Electoral history ==
- 1964; Satterfield was elected to the U.S. House of Representatives with 34.48% of the vote, defeating Republican Richard D. Obenshain and Independents Edward E. Haddock and Stanley Smith.
- 1966; Satterfield was re-elected unopposed.
- 1968; Satterfield was re-elected with 60.25% of the vote, defeating Republican John S. Hansen.
- 1970; Satterfield was re-elected with 67.24% of the vote, defeating Republican J. Harvie Wilkinson III and Independent Mrs. Ulrich Troubetskoy.
- 1972; Satterfield was re-elected unopposed.
- 1974; Satterfield was re-elected with 88.53% of the vote, defeating Independent Alan R. Ogden.
- 1976; Satterfield was re-elected with 88.06% of the vote, defeating Independent Ogden.
- 1978; Satterfield was re-elected with 87.85% of the vote, defeating Independent Ogden.

U.S. House of Representatives
Preceded by J. Vaughan Gary	Member of the U.S. House of Representatives from Virginia's 3rd congressional district 1965–1981	Succeeded by Thomas J. Bliley Jr.
