= James Machir =

American politician

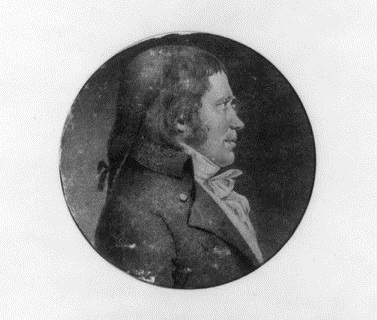

Member of the U.S. House of Representatives from Virginia's 3rd district
- In office March 4, 1797 – March 3, 1799
- Preceded by: George Jackson
- Succeeded by: George Jackson

Member of the Virginia House of Delegates
- In office 1818–1821
- In office 1811–1813
- In office 1793–1796

Personal details
- Born: 1764 Scotland
- Died: June 25, 1827 (aged 62–63)
- Party: Federalist

James Machir (1764 – June 25, 1827) was a United States representative from Virginia. Machir was a member of the Virginia House of Delegates from 1793 to 1796. He was elected as a Federalist to the Fifth Congress, having won 45.44% of the vote and defeating fellow Federalist Thomas Wilson and Democratic-Republicans John Mitchell and George Jackson and served from March 4, 1797, to March 3, 1799. He again served as a member of the Virginia House of Delegates from 1811 to 1813 and from 1818 to 1821. Machir died on June 25, 1827.

U.S. House of Representatives
Preceded by George Jackson	Member of the U.S. House of Representatives from Virginia's 3rd congressional district 1797–1799	Succeeded by George Jackson
