= Dave E. Satterfield Jr. =

American politician (1894–1946)

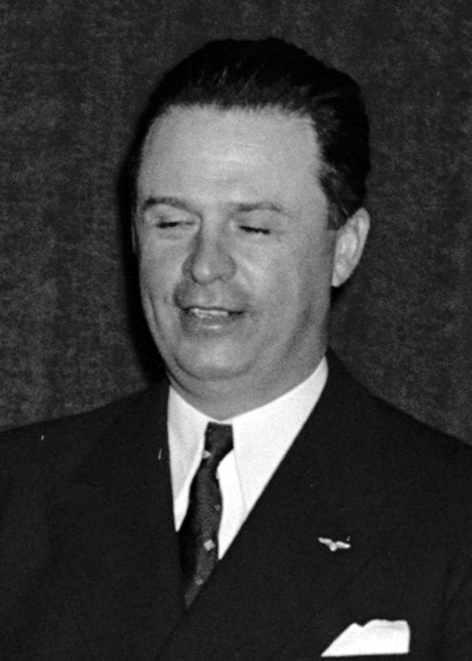

Member of the U.S. House of Representatives from Virginia's 3rd district
- In office November 2, 1937 – February 15, 1945
- Preceded by: Andrew J. Montague
- Succeeded by: J. Vaughan Gary

Commonwealth's Attorney for Richmond
- In office January 1, 1922 – December 31, 1933
- Preceded by: George E. Wise
- Succeeded by: T. Gray Haddon

Personal details
- Born: David Edward Satterfield Jr. September 11, 1894 Richmond, Virginia, U.S.
- Died: December 27, 1946 (aged 52) Richmond, Virginia, U.S.
- Resting place: Hollywood Cemetery
- Party: Democratic
- Spouse: Blanche Kidd
- Children: 2, including David III

Military service
- Branch/service: United States Navy; Naval Reserve
- Years of service: 1917–1919
- Rank: Lieutenant commander
- Unit: Naval Reserve Flying Corps
- Battles/wars: World War I

David Edward Satterfield Jr. (September 11, 1894 – December 27, 1946) was a U.S. representative from Virginia's 3rd congressional district.

== Biography ==
Born in Richmond, Virginia, on September 11, 1894, Satterfield attended the public schools and then Richmond College at the University of Richmond, where he was a three-year starter on its basketball team, the Spiders, from 1913 to 1916. After graduating from the university's law department in 1916, he was admitted to the bar and commenced practice in Richmond.

In 1917, during World War I, Satterfield enlisted in the United States Navy. He transferred to the Naval Flying Corps and was commissioned a first lieutenant; he ended his Navy service in 1919 as a lieutenant commander in the United States Naval Reserve Force.

Satterfield served as Commonwealth's attorney for Richmond from 1922 to 1933, until resigning from that post to return to his private practice.

He was elected as a Democrat to the U.S. House of Representatives on November 2, 1937, in a special election to fill the vacancy in the 75th Congress created by the death of Andrew J. Montague. Elected to a full term in 1938, Satterfield was re-elected to the House three additional times. Despite his first name being David, he was universally known in public life as "Dave."

Satterfield resigned his House seat on February 15, 1945, to become executive director of the Life Insurance Association of America in New York City. He was succeeded in the House by fellow Democrat J. Vaughan Gary. When Gary retired in 1964, Satterfield's son, David E. Satterfield III, was elected to the seat as a Democrat and served until his own retirement in 1980.

Satterfield died at a hospital in Richmond on December 27, 1946. He was buried in Hollywood Cemetery.

== Electoral history ==
- 1937; Satterfield was elected to the U.S. House of Representatives unopposed.
- 1938; Satterfield was re-elected unopposed.
- 1940; Satterfield was re-elected with 96.87% of the vote, defeating Socialist Winston Dawson.
- 1942; Satterfield was re-elected unopposed.
- 1944; Satterfield was re-elected unopposed.

U.S. House of Representatives
Preceded by Andrew J. Montague	Member of the U.S. House of Representatives from Virginia's 3rd congressional district 1937–1945	Succeeded by J. Vaughan Gary
