= Thomas J. Bliley Jr. =

American politician (1932–2023)

Tom Bliley
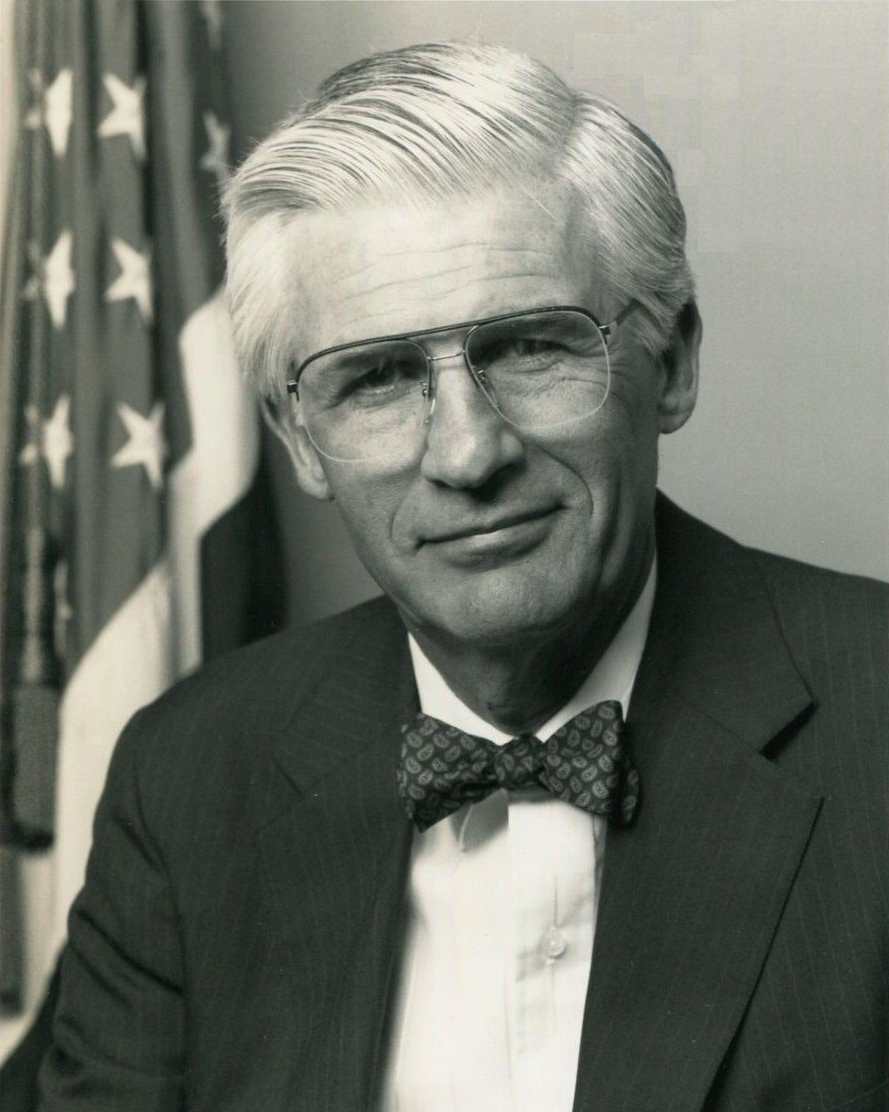
- Official portrait, c. 1999

Chair of the House Energy and Commerce Committee
- In office January 3, 1995 – January 3, 2001
- Preceded by: John Dingell
- Succeeded by: Billy Tauzin

Member of the U.S. House of Representatives from Virginia
- In office January 3, 1981 – January 3, 2001
- Preceded by: David E. Satterfield III
- Succeeded by: Eric Cantor
- Constituency: 3rd district (1981–1993); 7th district (1993–2001)

69th Mayor of Richmond
- In office July 1, 1970 – March 7, 1977
- Preceded by: Phil Bagley
- Succeeded by: Henry L. Marsh

Personal details
- Born: Thomas Jerome Bliley Jr. January 28, 1932 Chesterfield County, Virginia, U.S.
- Died: November 16, 2023 (aged 91) Henrico County, Virginia, U.S.
- Party: Democratic (before 1980); Republican (1980–2023)
- Spouse: Mary Kelley
- Children: 2
- Education: Georgetown University (BA)
- Thomas J. Bliley Jr.'s voice Bliley speaks in support of the Philanthropy Protection Act of 1995; Recorded November 28, 1995

Thomas Jerome Bliley Jr. (January 28, 1932 – November 16, 2023) was an American businessman, Navy veteran, and politician who served as a U.S. representative from the Commonwealth of Virginia. From 1981 to 2001, he served ten consecutive terms in Congress, including six years as chairman of the powerful House Energy and Commerce Committee.

== Early life ==
Thomas Jerome Bliley Jr. was born in Chesterfield County, Virginia, on January 28, 1932, the son of Carolyn and Thomas J. Bliley. He attended Catholic schools and graduated in 1948 at the age of 16 from Benedictine High School.

In 1952, Bliley earned a B.A. in Political Science from Georgetown University in Washington, D.C. He subsequently served as a lieutenant in the U.S. Navy from 1952 to 1955. He worked as a funeral director for Joseph W. Bliley Co. Funeral Home, a family business, eventually serving as President.

== Political career ==
In 1968, Bliley was elected vice-mayor of Richmond, Virginia. He held that post until 1970, when he successfully ran for mayor, a position he held until 1977. Bliley grew up as a conservative Byrd Democrat, but became a Republican after his term as mayor.

In 1980, Bliley won the Republican nomination for Congress representing Virginia's 3rd congressional district after eight-term incumbent David Satterfield announced his retirement. He won with 52 percent of the vote, becoming the first Republican to win an undisputed victory in the district since the Reconstruction Era. (In 1890, the House awarded Republican Edmund Waddill the seat after a disputed election.)

The 3rd, however, had been trending Republican for some time at the national level. It had been one of the first areas of Virginia where the old-line Byrd Democrats started splitting their tickets and voting Republican in presidential elections. As a result, it had not supported a Democrat for president since 1948, and had actually come close to electing a Republican twice in the 1960s, with the Democrats only surviving by less than 1,000 votes. However, conservative Democrats continued to hold most local offices, as well as most of the district's seats in the General Assembly, well into the 1980s.

Bliley never faced another contest anywhere near as close as his first one. He was reelected five times from the 3rd with little difficulty, only facing an independent in 1984 and running completely unopposed in 1988. After the 1990 census, the Democratic-controlled Virginia General Assembly began the process of redistricting the state. It was faced with a Justice Department order to create a majority-black district in order to comply with the Voting Rights Act. The legislature responded by shifting most of Richmond, which by this time had a black majority, into a new, majority-black 3rd district. Bliley's district was renumbered the 7th, and retained most of the whiter and wealthier sections of Richmond, along with several suburbs. Bliley now represented one of the most Republican districts in Virginia and the South, and he was handily reelected to four more terms, retiring in January 2001. Indeed, at the time the 7th was so heavily Republican that after it was redrawn in 1992, Bliley only faced a Democrat once, in 1996.

In 1995, when the Republican Party gained control of Congress, Bliley was elected Chairman of the House Commerce Committee, a position he held for six years. He was a principal author of several important laws including the Telecommunications Act of 1996, the Food and Drug Administration Modernization Act of 1997, the Private Securities Litigation Reform Act, and the Financial Services Modernization Act of 1999, also known as the "Gramm-Leach-Bliley Act".

=== After Congress ===
Bliley was a leader in the successful effort to create a public referendum to allow for the direct election of Richmond’s mayor.

== Personal life and death ==
Bliley, who was a practicing Roman Catholic, married Mary Virginia Kelley. The marriage produced two children.

Bliley died in Henrico, Virginia, on November 16, 2023, at age 91.

=== Elections ===
- 1980; Bliley was elected to the U.S. House of Representatives with 52% of the vote, defeating Democrat John A. Mapp, Independent Howard Hearnes Carwile, and Libertarian James B. Turney.
- 1982; Bliley was re-elected with 59% of the vote, defeating Democrat John A. Waldrop.
- 1984; Bliley was re-elected with 86% of the vote, defeating Independent Roger L. Coffey.
- 1986; Bliley was re-elected with 67% of the vote, defeating Democrat Kenneth E. Powell and Independent J. Stephens Hodges.
- 1988; Bliley was re-elected unopposed.
- 1990; Bliley was re-elected with 66% of the vote, defeating Democrat Jay Starke and Independent Rose L. Simpson.
- 1992; Bliley was re-elected with 83% of the vote, defeating Independent Gerald E. Berg.
- 1994; Bliley was re-elected with 84% of the vote, defeating Independent Berg.
- 1996; Bliley was re-elected with 75% of the vote, defeating Democrat Roderic H. Slayton and Independent Bradley E. Evans.
- 1998; Bliley was re-elected with 79% of the vote, defeating Independent Evans.

Political offices
Preceded by Phil Bagley	Mayor of Richmond; 1970–1977	Succeeded by Henry L. Marsh
U.S. House of Representatives
Preceded by David E. Satterfield III	Member of the U.S. House of Representatives from Virginia's 3rd congressional district 1981–1993	Succeeded by Bobby Scott
Preceded by George Allen	Member of the U.S. House of Representatives from Virginia's 7th congressional district 1993–2001	Succeeded by Eric Cantor
Preceded by John Dingell	Chair of the House Commerce Committee; 1995–2001	Succeeded by Billy Tauzin
