= 1793 Connecticut's at-large congressional district special elections =

Three special elections were held in Connecticut's at-large congressional district in 1793 to fill vacancies caused by the resignation, prior to the start of the 3rd Congress, of three representatives-elect.

== First special election ==
The first special election was held on April 8, 1793, after Jonathan Sturges (P) declined to serve the term for which he'd been elected

Candidate	Party	Votes	Percent
Uriah Tracy	Pro-Administration	2,197	49.8%
Zephaniah Swift	Pro-Administration	817	18.5%
Asher Miller		708	16.1%
Jonathan Ingersoll	Pro-Administration	436	9.9%
Tapping Reeve		252	5.7%

== Second special election ==
Benjamin Huntington (P) also resigned his seat before the start of Congress and was replaced by Jonathan Ingersoll in a special election held on September 16, 1793.

== Third special election ==
A pair of openings lead to a two-seat special election: 1. Member-elect Jonathan Ingersoll declined to serve from the September special election; and 2. Member-elect Stephen M. Mitchell declined to serve from the general election when he was appointed to the U.S. Senate.

A third election was held for their replacements, with the top two winning seats in the 3rd Congress: Joshua Coit (Pro-Administration) and Zephaniah Swift (Pro-Administration).

Candidate	Party	Votes	Percent
✓ Joshua Coit	Pro-Administration	2,448	35.7%
✓ Zephaniah Swift	Pro-Administration	1,657	24.2%
James Davenport	Pro-Administration	1,183	17.2%
Roger Griswold	Pro-Administration	864	12.6%
Chauncey Goodrich	Pro-Administration	352	5.1%
Nathaniel Smith	Pro-Administration	211	3.1%
Samuel W. Dana	Pro-Administration	144	2.1%

== See also ==
- List of special elections to the United States House of Representatives
- 1792 and 1793 United States House of Representatives elections
