= Virginia's 3rd congressional district =

U.S. House district for Virginia

Coordinates: 37°12′49″N 76°57′04″W

- Interactive map of district boundaries since 2023
- Representative: Bobby Scott; D–Newport News
- Distribution: 95.01% urban; 4.99% rural
- Population (2025): 772,588
- Median household income: $71,793
- Ethnicity: 43.2% Black; 39.0% White; 8.4% Hispanic; 5.4% Two or more races; 3.0% Asian; 1.1% other
- Cook PVI: D+18

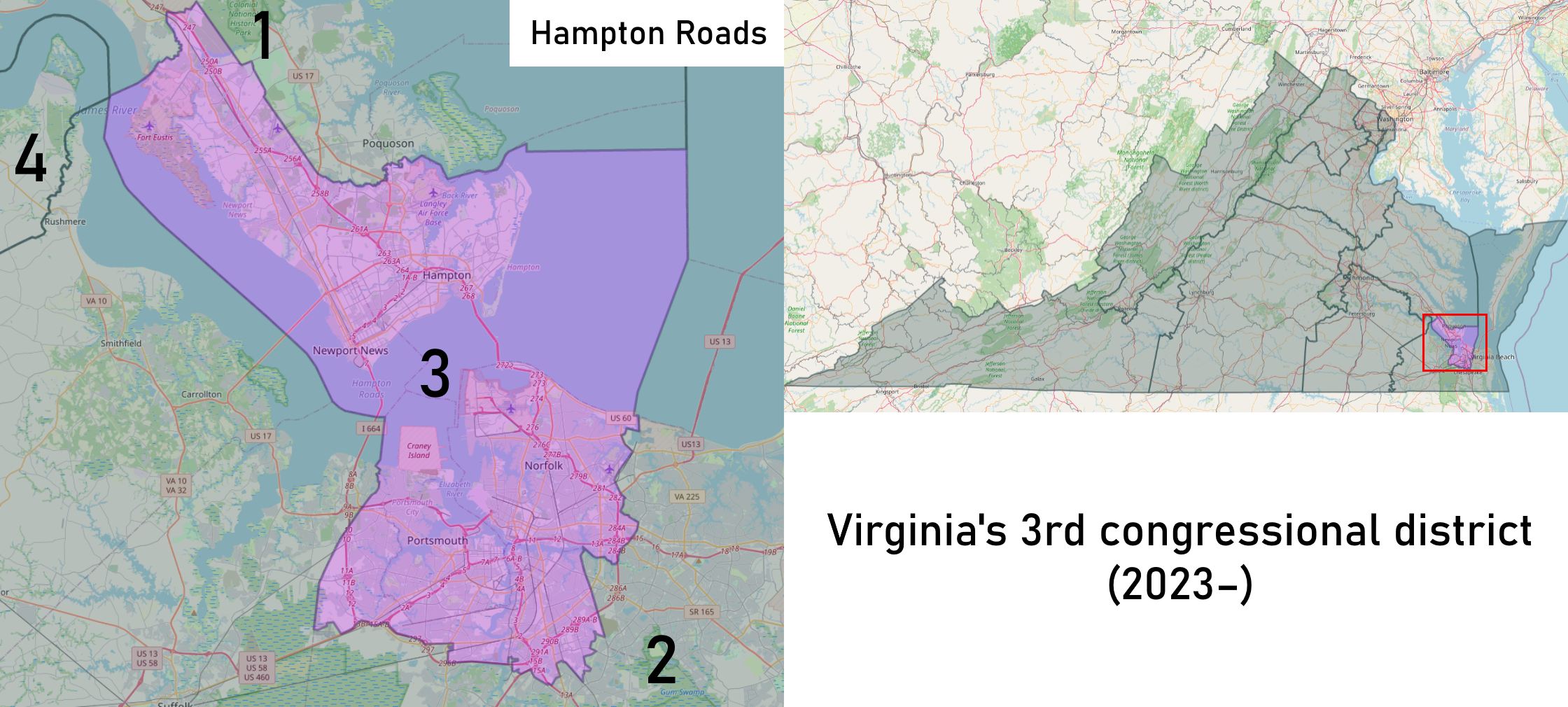
Virginia's 3rd congressional district from January 3, 2023

Virginia's third congressional district is a United States congressional district in the Commonwealth of Virginia, serving the independent cities of Norfolk, Newport News, Hampton and Portsmouth and part of the independent city of Chesapeake. It has been represented by Democrat Bobby Scott since 1993. The district is majority-minority, has a plurality black electorate, and is heavily Democratic.

In 1788, Virginia's 3rd congressional district consisted of all of modern Virginia including and west of the counties of Carroll, Floyd, Roanoke, Botetourt, Augusta and Rockingham. It also included what is today Pendleton County, West Virginia and also about the southern third of West Virginia, which in 1788 was all Greenbrier County. This area that is today about 48 counties and 13 independent cities was in 1788 only nine counties.

In the 1790 census, this area had a population of 66,045. For the 1792 congressional elections, the number of congressional districts in Virginia rose from 10 to 19. The only county that remained in the third district was Pendleton County. Harrison, Randolph, Hardy, Hampshire, Monongalia and Ohio Counties all now in West Virginia, were also in the district. This was all of northern West Virginia except the far eastern panhandle area. The new district's 1790 population was 30,145.

The 1800 census led to another increase in Virginia's congressional districts in 1802. The third district was again moved, this time to what was then Frederick and Shenandoah Counties in Virginia, which besides those counties also included the modern counties of Clarke and Warren and part of Page. The new 3rd district had a population of 38,767 in 1800.

For most of the time from the end of the Civil War to 1993, the 3rd district was a relatively compact district centered on Richmond. The district's current configuration dates to the 1992 election, when the Justice Department ordered Virginia to create a majority-minority district. At that time, portions of the old 1st, 2nd, 3rd and 4th districts were combined to create a new 3rd district.

The Virginia Legislature's 2012 redistricting was found unconstitutional, in part because of racial gerrymandering, and replaced was with a court-ordered map on January 16, 2016 for the 2016 elections. From 1993 to 2016, the 3rd had covered most of the majority-black precincts in and around Hampton Roads and Richmond. The court-drawn map shifted the area near Richmond to the 4th district.

== Recent election results from statewide races ==
Year	Office	Results
2008	President	Obama 67% - 32%
2008	Senate	Warner 76% - 23%
2009	Governor	Deeds 56% - 44%
2009	Lt. Governor	Wagner 59% - 41%
2009	Attorney General	Shannon 57% - 43%
2012	President	Obama 68% - 31%
2012	Senate	Kaine 69% - 31%
2013	Governor	McAuliffe 64% - 30%
2013	Lt. Governor	Northam 70% - 30%
2013	Attorney General	Herring 65% - 34%
2014	Senate	Warner 65% - 32%
2016	President	Clinton 64% - 31%
2017	Governor	Northam 69% - 30%
2017	Lt. Governor	Fairfax 67% - 32%
2017	Attorney General	Herring 68% - 32%
2018	Senate	Kaine 71% - 27%
2020	President	Biden 68% - 30%
2020	Senate	Warner 70% - 30%
2021	Governor	McAuliffe 63% - 35%
2021	Lt. Governor	Ayala 64% - 36%
2021	Attorney General	Herring 64% - 35%
2024	President	Harris 66% - 32%
2024	Senate	Kaine 69% - 31%
2025	Governor	Spanberger 72% - 28%
2025	Lt. Governor	Hashmi 70% - 30%
2025	Attorney General	Jones 69% - 31%

== Composition ==
For the 118th and successive Congresses (based on redistricting following the 2020 census), the district contains all or portions of the following communities:

Independent cities (5)

Chesapeake (part; also 2nd), Hampton, Newport News, Norfolk, Portsmouth

== List of members representing the district ==
Representative	Party	Term	Cong ress	Electoral history
District established March 4, 1789
Andrew Moore (Lexington)	Anti-Administration	March 4, 1789 – March 3, 1793	1st 2nd	Elected in 1789. Re-elected in 1790. Redistricted to the 2nd district.
Joseph Neville (Moorefield)	Anti-Administration	March 4, 1793 – March 3, 1795	3rd	Elected in 1793. Lost re-election.
George Jackson	Democratic-Republican	March 4, 1795 – March 3, 1797	4th	Elected in 1795. Lost re-election.
James Machir	Federalist	March 4, 1797 – March 3, 1799	5th	Elected in 1797. Retired.
George Jackson	Democratic-Republican	March 4, 1799 – March 3, 1803	6th 7th	Elected in 1799. Re-elected in 1801. Redistricted to the 1st district and retired.
John Smith (Winchester)	Democratic-Republican	March 4, 1803 – March 3, 1815	8th 9th 10th 11th 12th 13th	Redistricted from the 1st district and re-elected in 1803. Re-elected in 1805. Re-elected in 1807. Re-elected in 1809. Re-elected in 1811. Re-elected in 1813. Retired.
Henry S. Tucker (Winchester)	Democratic-Republican	March 4, 1815 – March 3, 1819	14th 15th	Elected in 1815. Re-elected in 1817. Retired.
Jared Williams (Newton)	Democratic-Republican	March 4, 1819 – March 3, 1823	16th 17th	Elected in 1819. Re-elected in 1821. Redistricted to the 17th district.
William S. Archer (Elk Hill)	Democratic-Republican	March 4, 1823 – March 3, 1825	18th 19th 20th 21st 22nd 23rd	Redistricted from the 17th district and re-elected in 1823. Re-elected in 1825. Re-elected in 1827. Re-elected in 1829. Re-elected in 1831. Re-elected in 1833. Lost re-election.
William S. Archer (Elk Hill)	Jacksonian	March 4, 1825 – March 3, 1835	18th 19th 20th 21st 22nd 23rd	Redistricted from the 17th district and re-elected in 1823. Re-elected in 1825. Re-elected in 1827. Re-elected in 1829. Re-elected in 1831. Re-elected in 1833. Lost re-election.
John W. Jones (Petersburg)	Jacksonian	March 4, 1835 – March 3, 1837	24th 25th 26th 27th	Elected in 1835. Re-elected in 1837. Re-elected in 1839. Re-elected in 1841. Redistricted to the 6th district.
John W. Jones (Petersburg)	Democratic	March 4, 1837 – March 3, 1843	24th 25th 26th 27th	Elected in 1835. Re-elected in 1837. Re-elected in 1839. Re-elected in 1841. Redistricted to the 6th district.
Walter Coles (Robertsons Store)	Democratic	March 4, 1843 – March 3, 1845	28th	Redistricted from the 6th district and re-elected in 1843. Retired.
William M. Tredway (Danville)	Democratic	March 4, 1845 – March 3, 1847	29th	Elected in 1845. Lost re-election.
Thomas S. Flournoy (Halifax)	Whig	March 4, 1847 – March 3, 1849	30th	Elected in 1847. Lost re-election.
Thomas H. Averett (Halifax)	Democratic	March 4, 1849 – March 3, 1853	31st 32nd	Elected in 1849. Re-elected in 1851. Lost re-election.
John S. Caskie (Richmond)	Democratic	March 4, 1853 – March 3, 1859	33rd 34th 35th	Redistricted from the 6th district and re-elected in 1853. Re-elected in 1855. Re-elected in 1857. Lost re-election.
Daniel C. DeJarnette Sr. (Bowling Green)	Independent Democratic	March 4, 1859 – March 3, 1861	36th	Elected in 1859. Resigned.
District inactive		March 4, 1861 – January 27, 1870	37th 38th 39th 40th 41st	Civil War and Reconstruction
Charles H. Porter (Richmond)	Republican	January 27, 1870 – March 3, 1873	41st 42nd	Elected in 1870. Retired.
John A. Smith (Richmond)	Republican	March 4, 1873 – March 3, 1875	43rd	Elected in 1872. Lost re-election.
Gilbert C. Walker (Richmond)	Democratic	March 4, 1875 – March 3, 1879	44th 45th	Elected in 1874. Re-elected in 1876. Retired.
Joseph E. Johnston (Longwood)	Democratic	March 4, 1879 – March 3, 1881	46th	Elected in 1878. Retired.
George D. Wise (Richmond)	Democratic	March 4, 1881 – April 11, 1890	47th 48th 49th 50th 51st	Elected in 1880. Re-elected in 1882. Re-elected in 1884. Re-elected in 1886. Election invalidated.
Edmund Waddill Jr. (Richmond)	Republican	April 12, 1890 – March 3, 1891	51st	Elected in 1890. Retired.
George D. Wise (Richmond)	Democratic	March 4, 1891 – March 3, 1895	52nd 53rd	Elected in 1890. Re-elected in 1892. Retired.
Tazewell Ellett (Richmond)	Democratic	March 4, 1895 – March 3, 1897	54th	Elected in 1894. Lost re-election.
John Lamb (Richmond)	Democratic	March 4, 1897 – March 3, 1913	55th 56th 57th 58th 59th 60th 61st 62nd	Elected in 1896. Re-elected in 1898. Re-elected in 1900. Re-elected in 1902. Re-elected in 1904. Re-elected in 1906. Re-elected in 1908. Re-elected in 1910. Lost re-election.
Andrew J. Montague (Richmond)	Democratic	March 4, 1913 – March 3, 1933	63rd 64th 65th 66th 67th 68th 69th 70th 71st 72nd	Elected in 1912. Re-elected in 1914. Re-elected in 1916. Re-elected in 1918. Re-elected in 1920. Re-elected in 1922. Re-elected in 1924. Re-elected in 1926. Re-elected in 1928. Re-elected in 1930. Redistricted to the at-large seat.
District inactive		March 4, 1933 – January 3, 1935	73rd	
Andrew J. Montague (Richmond)	Democratic	January 3, 1935 – January 24, 1937	74th 75th	Elected in 1934. Re-elected in 1936. Died.
Vacant		January 24, 1937 – November 2, 1937	75th	
David E. Satterfield Jr. (Richmond)	Democratic	November 2, 1937 – February 15, 1945	75th 76th 77th 78th 79th	Elected to finish Montague's term. Re-elected in 1938. Re-elected in 1940. Re-elected in 1942. Resigned.
Vacant		February 15, 1945 – March 6, 1945	79th	
J. Vaughan Gary (Richmond)	Democratic	March 6, 1945 – January 3, 1965	79th 80th 81st 82nd 83rd 84th 85th 86th 87th 88th	Elected to finish Satterfield's term. Re-elected in 1944. Re-elected in 1946. Re-elected in 1948. Re-elected in 1950. Re-elected in 1952. Re-elected in 1954. Re-elected in 1956. Re-elected in 1958. Re-elected in 1960. Re-elected in 1962. Retired.
David E. Satterfield III (Richmond)	Democratic	January 3, 1965 – January 3, 1981	89th 90th 91st 92nd 93rd 94th 95th 96th	Elected in 1964. Re-elected in 1966. Re-elected in 1968. Re-elected in 1970. Re-elected in 1972. Re-elected in 1974. Re-elected in 1976. Re-elected in 1978. Retired.
Thomas J. Bliley Jr. (Richmond)	Republican	January 3, 1981 – January 3, 1993	97th 98th 99th 100th 101st 102nd	Elected in 1980. Re-elected in 1982. Re-elected in 1984. Re-elected in 1986. Re-elected in 1988. Re-elected in 1990. Redistricted to the 7th district.
Robert C. Scott (Newport News)	Democratic	January 3, 1993 – present	103rd 104th 105th 106th 107th 108th 109th 110th 111th 112th 113th 114th 115th 116th 117th 118th 119th	Elected in 1992. Re-elected in 1994. Re-elected in 1996. Re-elected in 1998. Re-elected in 2000. Re-elected in 2002. Re-elected in 2004. Re-elected in 2006. Re-elected in 2008. Re-elected in 2010. Re-elected in 2012. Re-elected in 2014. Re-elected in 2016. Re-elected in 2018. Re-elected in 2020. Re-elected in 2022. Re-elected in 2024. Re-elected in 2026.

== Election results ==
Year	Democratic	Republican	Independents
1970	David E. Satterfield, III: 73,104	J. Harvie Wilkinson, III: 35,229	Ulrich Troubetskoy: 371
1972	David E. Satterfield, III: 102,523		
1974	David E. Satterfield, III: 64,627		Alan Robert Ogden: 7,574
1976	David E. Satterfield, III: 129,066		Alan Robert Ogden: 17,503
1978	David E. Satterfield, III: 104,550		Alan Robert Ogden: 14,453
1980	John A. Mapp: 60,962	Thomas J. Bliley, Jr.: 96,524	Howard H. Carwile: 19,549
1982	John A. Waldrop, Jr.: 63,946	Thomas J. Bliley, Jr.: 92,928	
1984		Thomas J. Bliley, Jr.: 169,987	Roger L. Coffey: 28,556
1986	Kenneth E. Powell: 32,961	Thomas J. Bliley, Jr.: 74,525	J. Stephen Bodges: 3,675
1988		Thomas J. Bliley, Jr.: 187,354	
1990	James A. Starke, Jr.: 36,253	Thomas J. Bliley, Jr.: 77,125	Rose L. Simpson: 4,317
1992	Robert C. Scott: 132,432	Daniel Jenkins: 35,780	
1994	Robert C. Scott: 108,532	Thomas E. Ward: 28,080	
1996	Robert C. Scott: 118,603	Elsie Goodwyn Holland: 25,781	
1998	Robert C. Scott: 48,129		R. S. Barnett: 14,453
2000	Robert C. Scott: 137,527		
2002	Robert C. Scott: 87,521		
2004	Robert C. Scott: 159,373	Winsome E. Sears: 70,194	
2006	Robert C. Scott: 133,546		
2008	Robert C. Scott: 239,911		
2010	Robert C. Scott: 114,754	C. L. Smith, Jr.: 44,553	John D. Kelly: 1,927
2012	Robert C. Scott: 259,199	Dean J. Longo: 58,931	
2014	Robert C. Scott: 139,197		
2016	Robert C. Scott: 208,337	Martin L. Williams: 103,289	
2018	Robert C. Scott: 198,615		
2020	Robert C. Scott: 233,326	John Collick: 107,299	
2022	Robert C. Scott: 139,659	Terry Namkung: 67,668	
2024	Robert C. Scott: 219,926	John Sitka III: 93,801	Write-in: 670

== Historical district boundaries ==
The Virginia Third District started in 1788, covering the counties of Botetourt, Rockbridge, Montgomery, Greenbrier, Washington, Augusta, Russell, Rockingham and Pendleton.

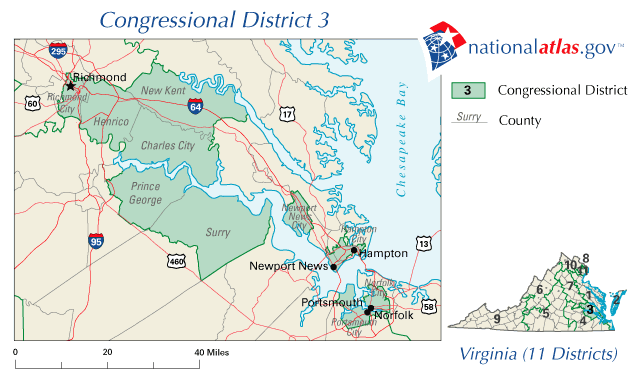
2003–2013

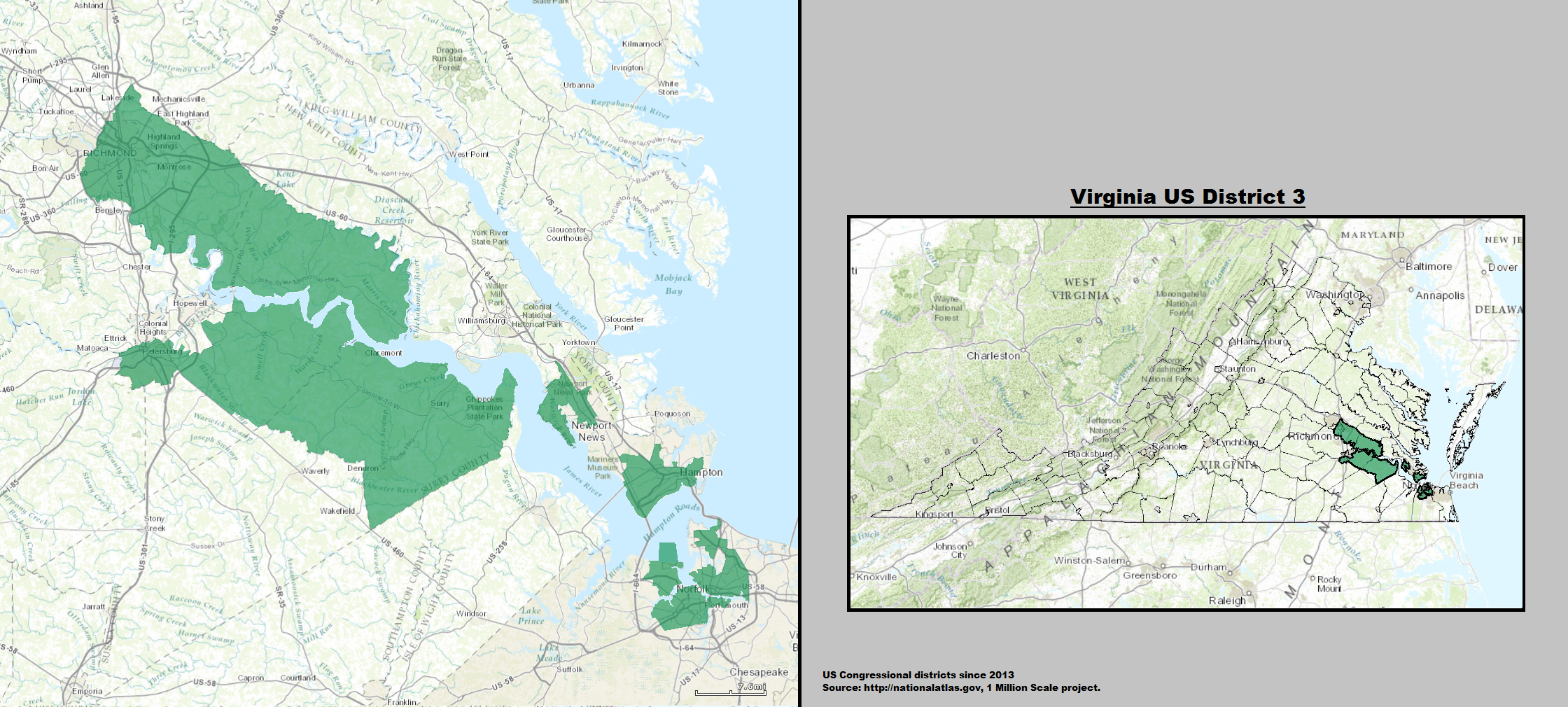
2013–2017

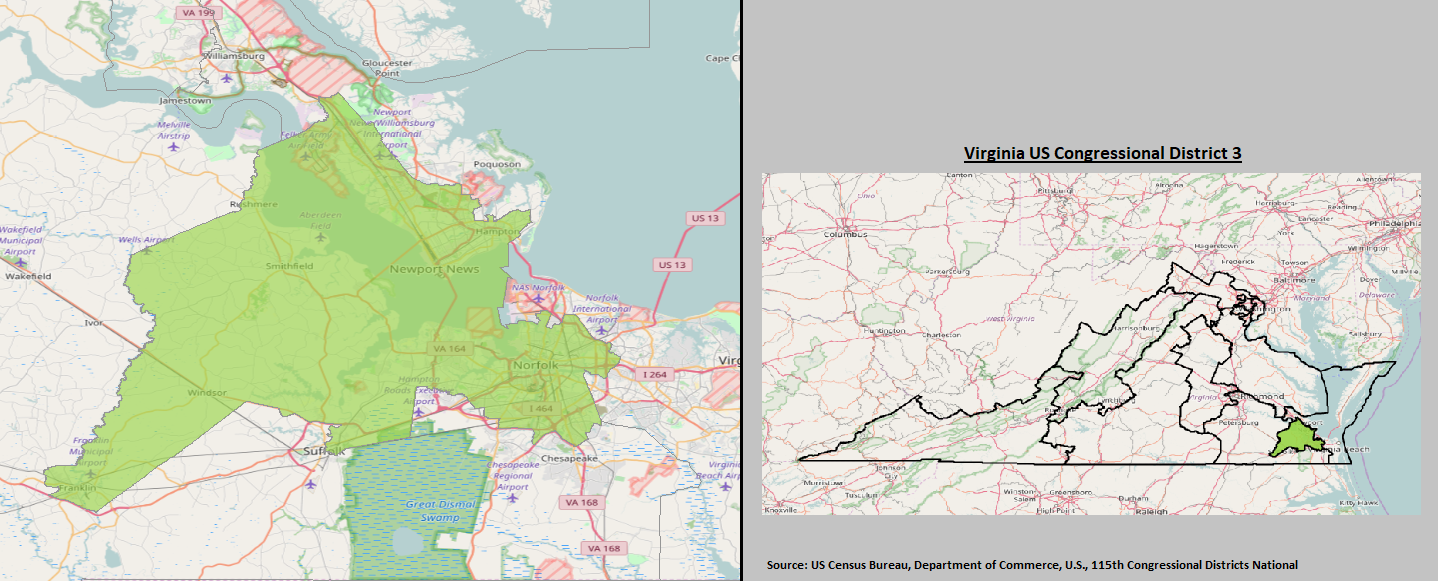
2017–2023

== See also ==
- Virginia's congressional districts
- List of United States congressional districts

== Sources ==
- Martis, Kenneth C. (1989). The Historical Atlas of Political Parties in the United States Congress. New York: Macmillan Publishing Company.
- Martis, Kenneth C. (1982). The Historical Atlas of United States Congressional Districts. New York: Macmillan Publishing Company.
- Congressional Biographical Directory of the United States 1774–present
