= Samuel Sullivan (politician) =

American politician

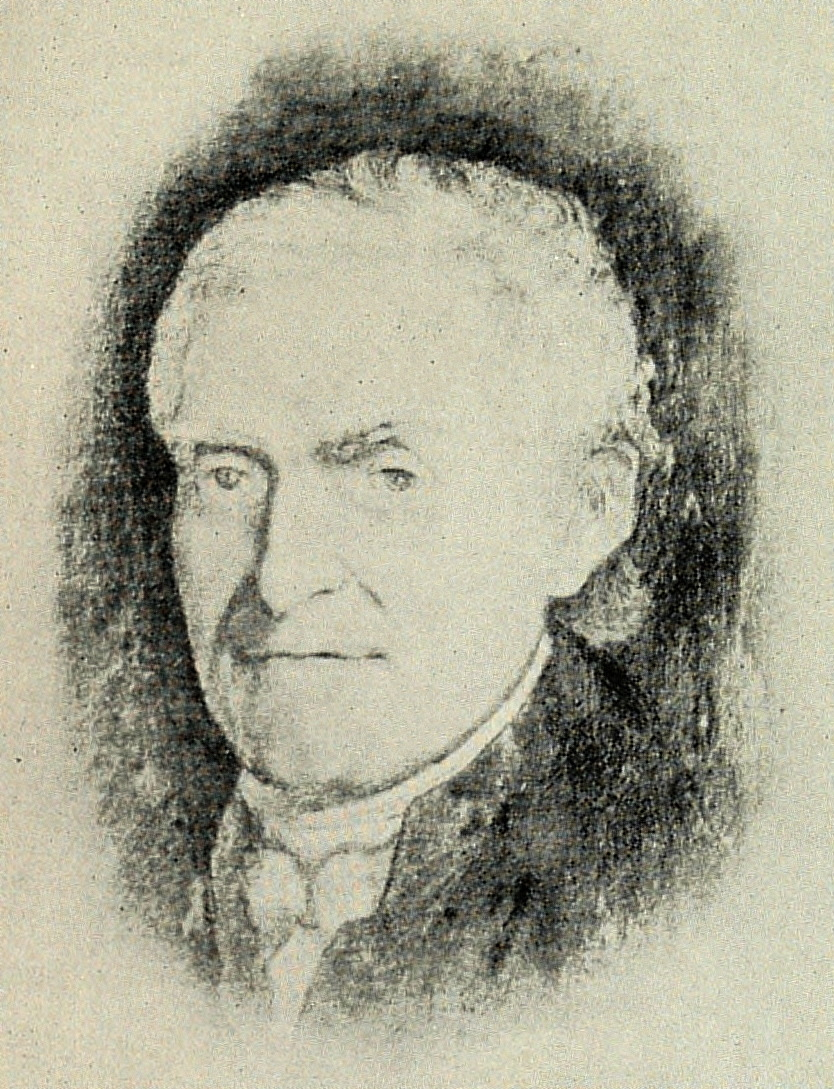
- Portrait of Samuel Sullivan

Ohio State Treasurer
- In office February 17, 1820 – February 17, 1823
- Governor: Ethan Allen Brown; Allen Trimble; Jeremiah Morrow
- Preceded by: Hiram M. Curry
- Succeeded by: Henry Brown

Member of the Ohio Senate from the Muskingum County district
- In office December 6, 1819 – February 16, 1820
- Preceded by: George Jackson
- Succeeded by: John Mathews

Personal details
- Born: April 10, 1773 Wilmington, Delaware
- Died: October 15, 1853 (aged 80) Falls Township, Muskingum County, Ohio
- Spouse: Mary Freeman

Samuel Sullivan was the Ohio State Treasurer from 1820 to 1823. He was the first manufacturer of fine pottery in Zanesville, Ohio.

== Biography ==
Samuel Sullivan was born on his father's plantation near Wilmington, Delaware on April 10, 1773. His parents were David and Jane Sullivan, whose ancestors came to America with Lord Baltimore. The plantation was near the mouth of Christina River, in view of the Delaware River. As a youth, both parents died, and he was left penniless by mismanagement or dishonesty by the administrators of the estate.

Sullivan entered a pottery near Philadelphia, served an apprenticeship, and later engaged in business in that city. In 1793, he very nearly died while tending to the sick during an epidemic of Yellow fever. He married Mary Freeman.

In 1804, Sullivan moved with his family to Chillicothe, Ohio. The unhealthy environment there soon prompted a move to St. Clairsville, Ohio, where they stayed until 1809. That year they moved to Zanesville, Ohio, where he stayed the rest of his life. He engaged in mercantile pursuits, and erected the first pottery that manufactured the quality goods for which Zanesville would later be famous.

On January 27, 1811, Sullivan was elected by the Ohio General Assembly as Associate Judge of the Muskingum County Court of Common Pleas. He served until February 4, 1815. He was elected to the Ohio State Senate for Muskingum County, for a two-year term commencing on December 6, 1819. On February 15, 1820, Ohio State Treasurer Hiram M. Curry resigned under a cloud. A defalcation was found, and Sullivan was elected by the legislature to replace Curry on the first ballot, and served February 17, 1820 to February 17, 1823. A bond of $140,000 was required to take office. In those days, there were no bonding companies, and William Henry Harrison asked to be the first to sign Sullivan's bond. He declined, saying that he preferred bondsmen from Muskingum County. A bond several times the required amount was secured in less than an hour. Sullivan balanced the books, served one three-year term, and refused re-election.

Sullivan returned to Zanesville and business life. In 1822, he was a candidate for United States representative for Ohio's 9th congressional district, but lost to Philemon Beecher. He was appointed postmaster on October 13, 1825, and retired from public life July 24, 1828. He continued in business for a few more years before retiring to his Falls Township farm. He died there October 15, 1853.

== Family ==
Sullivan's grandson, Samuel Sullivan "Sunset" Cox was named after him.

Political offices
Preceded by Hiram M. Curry	Ohio State Treasurer; February 17, 1820 – February 17, 1823	Succeeded by Henry Brown
Ohio Senate
Preceded by George Jackson	Senator for Muskingum County; December 6, 1819 – February 16, 1820	Succeeded by John Mathews
