= 1791 United States House of Representatives elections in Pennsylvania =

United States House of Representatives elections in Pennsylvania, 1791
- October 11, 1791

All 8 Pennsylvania seats to the United States House of Representatives
	First party	Second party
Party	Pro-Administration	Anti-Administration
Last election	6	2
Seats won	4	4
Seat change	▼2	▲2

Elections to the United States House of Representatives were held in Pennsylvania on Tuesday, October 11, 1791, for the 2nd Congress.

== Background ==
Six Pro-Administration and two Anti-Administration Representatives had been elected on an at-large basis in the previous election. The elections in Pennsylvania were the last elections held for the 2nd Congress, out of the states that were in the Union at the start of the Congress.

== Congressional districts ==
The previous election had been held at-large, but for the 2nd Congress, Pennsylvania divided itself up into 8 districts.

- The 1st district consisted of Delaware and Philadelphia Counties (including the city of Philadelphia).
- The 2nd district consisted of Bucks County
- The 3rd district consisted of Chester and Montgomery Counties
- The 4th district consisted of Luzerne, Northampton, and Berks Counties
- The 5th district consisted of Dauphin and Lancaster Counties
- The 6th district consisted of Northumberland, Mifflin, Huntingdon, Bedford and Franklin Counties
- The 7th district consisted of Cumberland and York Counties
- The 8th district consisted of Allegheny, Westmoreland, Washington, and Fayette Counties

Note: Many of these counties covered much larger areas in 1791 than they do today, having since been divided into smaller counties.

== Election Returns ==
Five incumbents (3 Anti-Administration and 2 Pro-Administration) ran for re-election, four of whom won. The incumbents George Clymer (P) and Henry Wynkoop (P) of the 2nd district and Thomas Scott (P) of the 8th district did not run for re-election. In addition, Frederick A. Muhlenberg switched from Pro-Administration to Anti-Administration. Four Pro-Administration and four Anti-Administration candidates were elected, a net gain of 2 seats for the Anti-Administration Party.

Election data are incomplete for the 1st and 2nd districts and are missing for the 4th and 5th districts.

1792 United States House election results
District	Pro-Administration			Anti-Administration			Other candidates
1st	Thomas Fitzsimons (I)	1,291	85.1%	Charles Thompson	226	14.9%	
2nd				Frederick Muhlenberg (I)			Dr. Jones
2nd				Amos Gregg			
3rd	Israel Jacobs	1,221	61.2%	Peter Muhlenberg (I)	774	38.8%	
4th				Daniel Hiester (I)			
5th	John W. Kittera						
6th	John Allison	1,229	18.3%	Andrew Gregg	3,437	51.2%	
6th	Thomas Johnston	692	10.3%	John McLean	728	10.9%	
6th				William Montgomery	623	9.3%	
7th	Thomas Hartley (I)	2,908	71.1%	William Irvine	1,180	28.9%	
8th	John Woods	1,517	34.8%	William Findley	2,839	65.2%	

== See also ==
- United States House of Representatives elections, 1790
