= Alexander D. Orr =

American politician

Alexander Dalrymple Orr

Member of the U.S. House of Representatives from Kentucky's 2nd district
- In office November 8, 1792 – March 3, 1797

Personal details
- Born: November 6, 1761 Alexander, Colony of Virginia, British America
- Died: June 21, 1835 (aged 73) Paris, Kentucky, US
- Relations: William Grayson (uncle)

Alexander Dalrymple Orr (November 6, 1761 – June 21, 1835) was an American farmer and politician from Maysville, Kentucky.

Orr was born in Alexandria, Virginia and in 1782 moved to Bourbon County, KY, which then remained a part of Virginia. His uncle was William Grayson, who served as a U.S. senator and delegate for Virginia. He served in the Virginia House of Delegates beginning in 1790, and the Virginia Senate beginning in 1792. After statehood, he represented Kentucky in the United States House of Representatives from November 8, 1792, to March 3, 1797. Orr died in Paris, Kentucky.

U.S. House of Representatives
Preceded by District created	Member of the U.S. House of Representatives from Kentucky's 2nd congressional district 1792–1797	Succeeded by John Fowler
