= George Jackson (Virginia politician) =

American farmer, lawyer, and politician (1757–1831)

Member of the Ohio Senate from Muskingum County
- In office 1817–1819
- Preceded by: Ebenezer Buckingham, Jr.
- Succeeded by: Samuel Sullivan

Member of the Ohio House of Representatives
- In office 1809–1812 Serving with David J. Marple; William Frame
- Preceded by: Multi-member at-large district
- Succeeded by: District abolished

Member of the U.S. House of Representatives from Virginia's 3rd district
- In office March 4, 1799 – March 3, 1803
- Preceded by: James Machir
- Succeeded by: John Smith
- In office March 4, 1795 – March 3, 1797
- Preceded by: Joseph Neville
- Succeeded by: James Machir

Member of the Virginia House of Delegates
- In office 1794
- In office 1785–1791

Personal details
- Born: January 9, 1757 Cecil County, Province of Maryland, British America
- Died: May 17, 1831 (aged 74) Zanesville, Ohio, U.S.
- Resting place: Falls Township, Muskingum County, Ohio
- Occupation: farmer, lawyer, politician

Military service
- Branch/service: Virginia militia
- Rank: Colonel
- Battles/wars: American Revolutionary War

George Jackson (January 9, 1757 – May 17, 1831) was an American farmer, lawyer, and politician.

== Biography ==
Born in Cecil County in the Province of Maryland to John and Elizabeth (Cummins) Jackson, his family moved to Virginia. He served in the Virginia militia during the American Revolutionary War, attaining the rank of colonel.

He later studied law and entered state politics, becoming a member of the Virginia House of Delegates. In 1788 he was a delegate to the Virginia Ratifying Convention, which ratified the United States Constitution. He was elected to the United States House of Representatives and served from 1795 to 1797 and 1799 to 1803. In about 1806, Jackson moved to Zanesville, Ohio, and served in the state legislature. He died there on May 17, 1831, and was buried in Falls Township.

== Family ==
George Jackson was married to Elizabeth Brake (daughter of John Brake) and was the father of United States Representatives John G. Jackson and Edward B. Jackson. Through his son John, he is a great-grandfather of William T. Bland, who also served as a U.S. representative.

== Electoral history ==
- 1795; Jackson was elected to the U.S. House of Representatives unopposed.
- 1797; Jackson was defeated in his bid for re-election.
- 1799; Jackson was re-elected with 53.94% of the vote, defeating a Federalist identified only as Haymond.
- 1801; Jackson was re-elected with 84.05% of the vote, defeating Federalist Jonathan J. Jacobs.

U.S. House of Representatives
Preceded by Joseph Neville	United States Representative from Virginia's 3rd congressional district 1795–1797	Succeeded by James Machir
Preceded by James Machir	United States Representative from Virginia's 3rd congressional district 1799–1803	Succeeded by John Smith
Ohio House of Representatives
Preceded by James Clark; David J. Marple	Representative from Muskingum and Tuscarawas Counties; 1809–1810; Served alongside: David J. Marple	Succeeded by Himself and David J. Marple as Representatives from Muskingum, Tuscarawas, and Guernsey Counties
Preceded by Himself and David J. Marple as Representatives from Muskingum and Tuscarawas Counties	Representative from Muskingum, Tuscarawas, and Guernsey Counties; 1810–1811; Served alongside: David J. Marple	Succeeded by Himself and William Frame as Representatives from Muskingum, Tuscarawas, Guernsey, and Coshocton Counties
Preceded by Himself and David J. Marple as Representatives from Muskingum, Tuscarawas, and Guernsey Counties	Representative from Muskingum, Tuscarawas, Guernsey, and Coshocton Counties; 1811–1812; Served alongside: William Frame	District eliminated
Ohio Senate
Preceded by Ebenezer Buckingham, Jr.	Senator from Muskingum County; 1817–1819	Succeeded by Samuel Sullivan
