= Joseph Neville =

American politician

Member of the U.S. House of Representatives from Virginia's 3rd district
- In office March 4, 1793 – March 3, 1795
- Preceded by: Andrew Moore
- Succeeded by: George Jackson

Member of the Virginia House of Delegates from Hampshire County
- In office May 1780 – March 1781 Serving with Robert Parker
- Preceded by: Abraham Hite
- Succeeded by: Abraham Hite
- In office may 1777-Jan. 1778 Serving with Abraham Hite
- Preceded by: Abraham Hite
- Succeeded by: William Aylett Booth

Member of the Virginia House of Burgesses
- In office 1773–1776 Serving with James Mercer
- Preceded by: Alexander White
- Succeeded by: n/a

Personal details
- Born: December 2, 1733 Gloucester County, Virginia Colony, British America
- Died: March 4, 1819 (aged 85) Hardy County, Virginia, U.S.
- Resting place: Edward Williams Graveyard, Hardy County, West Virginia
- Party: Anti-Administration
- Spouse: Agnes Nancy Brown
- Children: Joseph III, John, Elizabeth, Jethro, Mary, Amelia, Nancy Ann, William Joseph, George, Presley
- Parent(s): Joseph Neville, Sr., and Ann Bohannon
- Occupation: soldier, planter/rancher, politician

Military service
- Allegiance: United States of America
- Branch/service: Continental Army, Virginia Militia
- Rank: Brigadier General
- Battles/wars: American Revolutionary War, War of 1812

Joseph Neville Jr. (December 2, 1733 – March 4, 1819) was an American soldier, planter and politician from Virginia. In addition to military service during the American Revolutionary War and War of 1812, Neville represented Hampshire County in the Virginia House of Burgesses, several of the Virginia Revolutionary Conventions and in the House of Delegates during the American Revolutionary War. Fellow legislators twice elected him to the United States House of Representatives, where he served from 1793 until 1795. He died at the age of 85 in what became Hardy County during his lifetime.

== Early life ==
Joseph Neville, Jr., was born December 2, 1733, in Gloucester County in the Colony of Virginia, to Joseph Neville, Sr., and his second wife, Ann Bohannon Neville. He had at least five brothers and two sisters who survived to adulthood. His eldest brother John would become a career soldier, first serving on the Appalachian frontier in the French and Indian War. His younger brothers Captain William Neville and private James Neville also served in the Virginia militia or Continental Army. His father, a landowner of the same name, was too old to fight but during the American Revolution provided the troops with food and supplies. The surname Neville appears in several different forms in early documents; Neavil, Nevil, Nevill, and Neavel are other common variations of the name.

Neville married Agnes Brown in Bedford County, Virginia in 1764. They would have ten children.

== Career ==
In 1772, when Alexander White accepted the position of King's attorney (prosecutor) for Hampshire County, Neville (or his father as discussed below) replaced him in the part-time position of delegate to the House of Burgesses. Although a relatively recent settler, he served alongside non-resident lawyer and real estate investor John Mercer. Both men won re-election in 1774, during Lord Dunmore's War (during which his brother John Neville was a Virginia militia officer). As the colony chafed under what Virginians called the Intolerable Acts, Joseph Neville signed the non-importation pact in May 1774, and Mercer signed in August. Relatively new and unpopulated counties west of the Appalachians had difficulty funding the travel of representatives to the state capital, either when it was Williamsburg (in the Tidewater region), or later Richmond, and travel was also difficult and time-consuming. Thus, his fellow Hampshire County delegate James Mercer actually lived in Fredericksburg, although the Mercer family owned land west of the Appalachian mountains (some of it involved in a long-running dispute with the Hite family) and were active in the Ohio Company which encouraged trans-Appalachian settlement.

When the governor dissolved the legislature, Hampshire County voters continued to elect Neville and Mercer to represent them in the first four Revolutionary Conventions, held in Williamsburg and later Richmond, although no record exists that Neville actually appeared for any but the Fourth Convention (in the winter of 1775–1776). Voters then elected Neville and established pioneer Col. Abraham Hite to represent them in the House of Delegates in 1777–1778, but Enoch Innis replaced Neville for the 1778 session. Hampshire County voters elected Neville to his final term in the House of Delegates in 1780, and he served alongside Robert Parker.

During the American Revolutionary War, Neville was the Hampshire county lieutenant with the rank of colonel. His brother John Neville also led several Virginia companies and regiments, initially as captain of an independent company in 1775 sent to defend Fort Pitt (at modern day Pittsburgh, Pennsylvania). John was later promoted to Lieutenant Colonel of the 12th Virginia Regiment in 1776, to Colonel of the 8th Virginia in 1777, and transferred to the 4th Virginia in 1778, seeing action at Trenton, Princeton, Germantown, and Monmouth. In May 1776, Joseph Neville was reimbursed 381 pounds for "necessities for Captain Abel Westfall's Company" (the 8th Virginia recruited from Hampshire county), which defended Charleston, South Carolina until February 1777. The 8th Virginia would later be consolidated with the 12th Virginia (also recruited in Hampshire County and led by Col. Abraham Hite), and withstood a siege at Charleston, South Carolina before finally surrendering in May 1780. Joseph Neville's services to the newly formed government of Virginia included disposing of the confiscated estate of John Murray, 4th Earl of Dunmore, following his ouster as the governor of Virginia. Legislators commissioned Neville and Enoch Innes (who replaced Neville in the House of Delegates) to do the job.

In 1782 Neville and Colonel Alexander McLean of Pennsylvania were hired to survey the Mason–Dixon line beyond the previous survey that had demarcated the Maryland/Pennsylvania border to demarcate Pennsylvania's western boundary. They submitted a report to Governor Benjamin Harrison, and the Assembly of Virginia. Ultimately, the part of West Augusta County that Virginians called Yohogania County would become Washington County, Pennsylvania, and the remainder Ohio County and Monongelia County in Virginia (became West Virginia in the American Civil War) The legislature accepted the corrected report in 1784, and when rechecked in 1849 (in another dispute concerning those counties and a bridge over the Ohio River) it was found substantially correct.

Also in 1784, Joseph Neville became one of the trustees of the relatively new town of Moorefield (then in Hampshire County). A farmer, he raised and fattened cattle for the Baltimore market (as did many others in the area), as well as held an interest in the town's general store kept by Isaac Hider. During the 1785 legislative session, Hampshire County delegate Isaac VanMeter, of a well-established family, moved to divide Hampshire County and create Hardy County. The bill passed and was signed into law by governor Patrick Henry. The VanMeter and Neville families lived in the new Hardy county. Moorefield became the county seat and Hardy became the new county's first sheriff as well as its first surveyor. Complicating matters, Hardy's father of the same name either died in Pittsylvania County (substantially to the southeast) in 1783 or lived until the 1790s.

The following year, 1785, Joseph Neville owned four adult slaves in Hardy County, and in 1795 he owned seven adult slaves. The 1787 Virginia census includes entries for two men named 'Joseph Nevil', at opposite ends of the Commonwealth. Oddly (although surveying duties may have involved travel) both the Isle of Wight entry and the Hardy County entry (which shows him as owning three enslaved Black men and three Black boys), show 'Joseph Nevil' as a nonresident.

In the 1790s, after the future chief justice John Marshall began selling lands in what had been the South Branch Manor of Lord Fairfax, Joseph Neville was one of the dozens of local residents purchasing parts of the property once-disputed in Martin v. Hunter's Lessee.

On December 2, 1792, the Virginia Assembly passed an act allowing militias to be established throughout every county of the commonwealth. These county militias were further organized in brigades and division. Joseph Neville commanded the 18th Brigade, which included the 14th, 46th, and 77th Regiments. He had accepted that brigadier general commission on December 24, 1803, and served until his (natural) death. His 18th Brigade fell under the 3rd Division of Militia. His brother John Neville continued to live in what was now Pennsylvania, and also held a general's rank, and a job as federal tax collector. In 1794, John Neville defied an anti-tax mob and shot a man, so the mob burned his house, which led officials in Washington to send troops against what became known as the Whiskey Rebellion. That early Pittsburgh pioneer would die (also of natural causes) in 1803, in what was named after him Neville Township.

In the War of 1812, Joseph Neville continued to lead the Virginia Militia from Hardy County, with a rank of Brigadier General. His service was mainly in a reserve role, sending 55 men under Col. Jacob VanMeter and his own son (and future delegate) Col. Jethro Neville to defend Norfolk. An 1814 letter from the adjutant general's office in Richmond, Virginia, mentions Neville among several other militia generals who were ordered to stand ready to mobilize their respective troops "at a moment's warning".

== Death ==
Neville died in Hardy County, Virginia on March 4, 1819, at the age of 85. His wife had died two years before.

U.S. House of Representatives
Preceded by Andrew Moore	Member of the U.S. House of Representatives from Virginia's 3rd congressional district 1793–1795	Succeeded by George Jackson
