= 1790–91 United States House of Representatives elections =

House elections for the 2nd U.S. Congress

- April 27, 1790 – October 11, 1791 (Note: Excluding states that joined during the Second Congress and a very late run-off election in Massachusetts's 6th congressional district.)

All 67 seats in the United States House of Representatives (Note: 2 more seats were added by the admission of new states after the start of this Congress) 34 seats needed for a majority
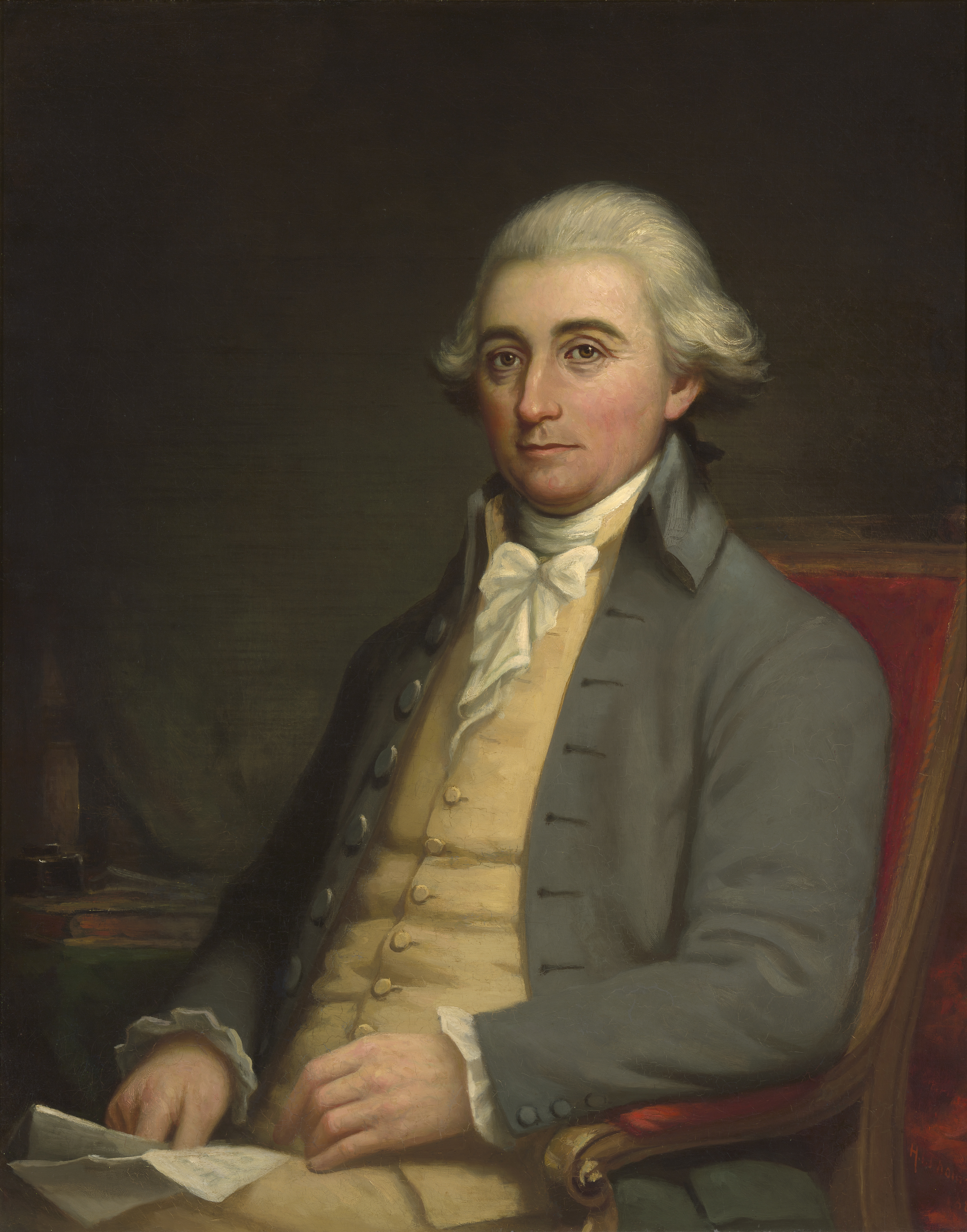

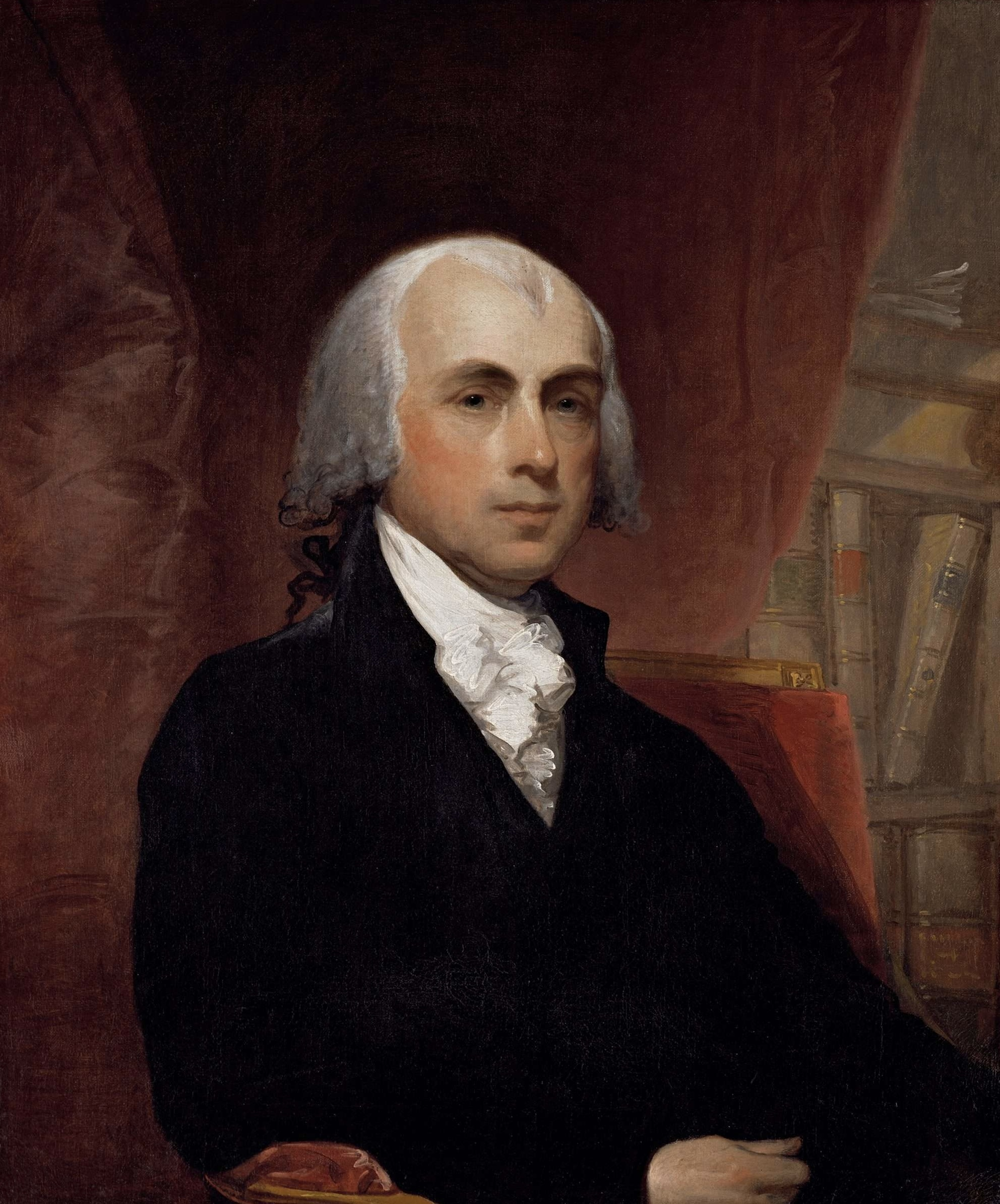
| | Majority party | Minority party |
|---|---|---|
| Leader | Jonathan Trumbull Jr. | James Madison |
| Party | Pro-Administration | Anti-Administration |
| Leader's seat | Connecticut at-large | Virginia 5th |
| Last election | 37 seats | 28 seats |
| Seats won | 39 (Note: Includes the late election from Kentucky who was admitted to the union after the 2nd Congress had started to meet, and did not hold their elections for U.S. representatives until June 1791) (Note: Including three Chesapeake members who were Pro-Administration) | 30 (Note: Including three Chesapeake members who were Anti-Administration) |
| Seat change | ▲2 | ▲2 |
- Results: Pro-Administration hold Pro-Administration gain Anti-Administration hold Anti-Administration gain Chesapeake gain Undistricted territory
Speaker before election
Frederick Muhlenberg
Pro-Administration
Elected Speaker
Jonathan Trumbull Jr.
Pro-Administration

The 1790–91 United States House of Representatives elections were held on various dates in various states between April 27, 1790, and October 11, 1791. Each state set its own date for its elections to the House of Representatives before or after the first session of the 2nd United States Congress convened on October 24, 1791. This was the first midterm election cycle, which took place in the middle of President George Washington's first term. The size of the House increased to 67 seats after the new state of Vermont elected its first representatives.

While formal political parties still did not exist, coalitions of pro-Washington (Pro-Admin.) representatives and anti-Administration representatives each gained two seats as a result of the addition of new states to the union.

Speaker Frederick Muhlenberg was succeeded by Jonathan Trumbull Jr., who became the 2nd Speaker of the House.

== Retirements ==
Either five or six incumbents did not seek re-election.

=== Anti-Administration ===
1. Maryland 4: William Smith retired.
2. Virginia 6: Isaac Coles retired.

Aedanus Burke, a U.S. representative from South Carolina's 2nd congressional district, either retired or lost re-election but it is not known.

=== Pro-Administration ===
1. Pennsylvania at-large: George Clymer retired.
2. Pennsylvania at-large: Henry Wynkoop retired.
3. Pennsylvania at-large: Thomas Scott retired.

== Election summaries ==
In this period, each state fixed its own date for congressional general elections, as early as April 27, 1790 (in New York) and as late as October 11, 1791 (in Pennsylvania). Elections to a Congress took place both in the even-numbered year before and in the odd-numbered year when the Congress convened. In some states, the congressional delegation was not elected until after the legal start of the Congress (on the 4th day of March in the odd-numbered year). The first session of this Congress was convened in Philadelphia on October 24, 1791.

Kentucky and Vermont became states during the 2nd Congress, adding two seats each. The legislation admitted Vermont was passed at the end of the 1st Congress taking effect on March 4, 1791, the first day of the 2nd Congress, so that Vermont was represented from the start of the Congress, while Kentucky was unrepresented until the 2nd session.

Pro-Administration
Anti-Administration

| State | Type | Date | Total seats | Pro- Administration | | Anti- Administration | |
| State | Type | Date | Total seats | Seats | Change | Seats | Change |
|---|---|---|---|---|---|---|---|
| New York | Districts | April 27–29, 1790 | 6 | 4 | ▲1 | 2 | ▼1 |
| New Hampshire | At-large | August 30, 1790 | 3 | 3 | ▲1 | 0 | ▼1 |
| Virginia | Districts | September 1, 1790 | 10 | 2 | ▼1 | 8 | ▲1 |
| Connecticut | At-large | September 20, 1790 | 5 | 5 | Steady | 0 | Steady |
| Maryland | Mixed (Note: Maryland had six representatives elected by the whole state electorate, who had to choose one candidate from each district.) | October 4, 1790 | 6 | 3 | ▲1 | 3 | ▼1 |
| Massachusetts | Districts | October 4, 1790 (Note: add Massachusetts required a majority for electionitional trials were required in 4 districts, held between November 26, 1790, and April 2, 1792.) | 8 | 7 | ▲1 | 1 | ▼1 |
| South Carolina | Districts | October 12, 1790 | 5 | 3 | ▲1 | 2 | ▼1 |
| Rhode Island | At-large | October 19, 1790 | 1 | 1 | Steady | 0 | Steady |
| Delaware | At-large | November 8, 1790 | 1 | 1 | Steady | 0 | Steady |
| Georgia | District | January 3, 1791 | 3 | 0 | Steady | 3 | Steady |
| New Jersey | At-large | January 26, 1791 | 4 | 4 | Steady | 0 | Steady |
| North Carolina | Districts | January 28, 1791 | 5 | 2 | Steady | 3 | Steady |
Late elections (after the March 4, 1791, beginning of the term)
| Vermont | Districts | July 13, 1791 (Note: A majority was required for election, which was not met in one of the districts necessitating a second election on September 6, 1791) | 2 | 0 | Steady | 2 | ▲2 |
| Pennsylvania | Districts | October 11, 1791 | 8 | 4 | ▼2 | 4 | ▲2 |
| Kentucky | Districts | June 1, 1792 | 2 | 0 | Steady | 2 | ▲2 |
| Total | | | 67 | 39 56.5% | ▲3 | 30 43.5% | ▼1 |

House seats
| Pro-Admin | 56.52% |
| Anti-Admin | 43.48% |

== Change in composition ==
| Anti-Administration | Pro-Administration | Vacant |

=== End of the last Congress ===
| NY‑6 | NY‑4 | NY‑1 | NH‑AL | MA‑8 | MA‑3 | MD‑4 | MD‑3 | MD‑2 | MD‑1 | GA‑3 | GA‑2 | GA‑1 | ← Anti-Administration | | | | | | |
| NC‑1 | NC‑2 | NC‑3 | PA‑AL | PA‑AL | SC‑2 | SC‑4 | SC‑5 | VA‑2 | VA‑3 | VA‑5 | VA‑6 | VA‑7 | VA‑8 | VA‑9 | MA‑5 | VA‑10 | VA‑4 | VA‑1 | SC‑3 |
| Majority → | | | | | | | | | | | | | | | | | | | SC‑1 |
| NY‑4 | NY‑5 | NH‑AL | NH‑AL | NJ‑AL | NJ‑AL | NJ‑AL | NJ‑AL | NY‑2 | NY‑3 | NY‑5 | NC‑4 | NC‑5 | PA‑AL | PA‑AL | PA‑AL | PA‑AL | PA‑AL | PA‑AL | RI‑AL |
| MA‑7 | MA‑6 | MA‑4 | MA‑2 | MA‑1 | MD‑6 | MD‑5 | DE‑AL | CT‑AL | CT‑AL | CT‑AL | CT‑AL | CT‑AL | ← Pro-Administration | | | | | | |

=== Beginning of the next Congress ===
| PA‑4 | NC‑4 | NC‑3 | NC‑2 | NY‑4 | MA‑3 | MA‑2 | MD‑6 | MD‑4 | MD‑2 | GA‑3 | GA‑2 | GA‑1 | ← Anti-Administration | | | | | | |
| PA‑6 | PA‑8 | SC‑4 | SC‑5 | VA‑2 | VA‑3 | VA‑5 | VA‑6 | VA‑7 | VA‑8 | VA‑9 | VA‑10 | MA‑6 | MA‑8 | NY‑1 | VT‑1 | VT‑2 | VA‑4 | VA‑1 | SC‑3 |
| Majority → | | | | | | | | | | | | | | | | | | | SC‑2 |
| NH‑AL | NH‑AL | NJ‑AL | NJ‑AL | NJ‑AL | NJ‑AL | NH‑AL | NY‑2 | NY‑3 | NY‑5 | NY‑6 | NC‑1 | NC‑5 | PA‑1 | PA‑2 | PA‑3 | PA‑5 | PA‑7 | RI‑AL | SC‑1 |
| MA‑7 | MA‑5 | MA‑3 | MA‑1 | MD‑5 | MD‑3 | MD‑1 | DE‑AL | CT‑AL | CT‑AL | CT‑AL | CT‑AL | CT‑AL | ← Pro-Administration | | | | | | |

== Special elections ==
There were special elections in 1790 and 1791 during the 1st United States Congress and 2nd United States Congress. New states and newly ratified states are not included as special elections.

Elections are sorted by date then district.

=== 1st Congress ===
| District | Incumbent | | | This race | |
| District | Member | Party | First elected | Results | Candidates |
|---|---|---|---|---|---|
| Virginia 9 | Theodorick Bland | Anti- Administration | 1789 | Incumbent died June 1, 1790. New member elected in July 1790. Anti-Administration hold. Winner was later elected to the next term; see below. | ▌ ✓ William B. Giles (Anti-Admin.) 54.5%; ▌Thomas Edmunds (Pro-Admin.) 45.5% |
| Connecticut at-large | Pierpont Edwards | Pro- Administration | 1790 | Predecessor declined election. New member elected December 16, 1790. Pro-Administration hold. Winner had already been elected to the next term; see below. | ▌ ✓ Jeremiah Wadsworth (Pro-Admin.) 48.6%; ▌Amasa Learned (Pro-Admin.) 23.9%; ▌Benjamin Huntington (Pro-Admin.) 13.2%; ▌Tapping Reeve (Unknown) 8.1%; ▌Stephen M. Mitchell (Unknown) 4.1%; ▌James Davenport (Unknown) 1.5%; ▌John Chester (Unknown) 0.7% |

=== 2nd Congress ===
| District | Incumbent | | | This race | |
| District | Member | Party | First elected | Results | Candidates |
|---|---|---|---|---|---|
| New York 1 | Vacant | | | Rep.-elect James Townsend (Pro-Admin.) died May 24, 1790. New member elected April 26–28, 1791. Anti-Administration gain. | ▌ ✓ Thomas Tredwell (Anti-Admin.) 26.2%; ▌John Vanderbilt (Pro-Admin.) 19.2%; ▌Henry Peters (Pro-Admin.) 14.5%; ▌Ezra L'Hommedieu (Anti-Admin.) 14.2%; ▌Stephen Carman (Anti-Admin.) 14.1%; ▌Isaac Ledyard (Pro-Admin.) 11.8% |
| Connecticut at-large | Roger Sherman | Pro- Administration | 1790 | Incumbent-and-Representative-elect resigned March 31, 1791, to become U.S. Senator. New member elected September 19, 1791. Pro-Administration hold. | ▌ ✓ Amasa Learned (Pro-Admin.); [data missing] |
| Maryland 3 | William Pinkney | Pro- Administration | 1790 | Incumbent resigned. New member elected October 26–29, 1791 and seated February 5, 1792. Anti-Administration gain. | ▌ ✓ John Francis Mercer (Anti-Admin.); Unopposed |

== Connecticut ==
Connecticut elected all five of its representatives at-large on a general ticket on September 20, 1790.

| District | Incumbent | | | This race | |
| District | Member | Party | First elected | Results | Candidates |
|---|---|---|---|---|---|
| Connecticut at-large 5 seats | Roger Sherman | Pro-Administration | 1788 | Incumbent re-elected. Winner declined to serve and a new member would later be elected in a special election. | ▌ ✓ Roger Sherman (Pro-Admin.) 2,969 votes; ▌ ✓ Pierpont Edwards (Pro-Admin.) 2,239 votes; ▌ ✓ James Hillhouse (Pro-Admin.) 2,035 votes; ▌ ✓ Jonathan Sturges (Pro-Admin.) 1,730 votes; ▌ ✓ Jonathan Trumbull Jr. (Pro-Admin.) 1,720 votes; ▌Tapping Reeve (Pro-Admin.) 1,672 votes; ▌Jeremiah Wadsworth (Pro-Admin.) 1,658 votes; ▌Amasa Learned (Pro-Admin.) 1,463 votes; ▌Stephen M. Mitchell (Pro-Admin.) 1,435 votes; ▌Benjamin Huntington (Pro-Admin.) 1,372 votes; ▌John Chester (Unknown) 881 votes; ▌James Davenport (Pro-Admin.) 786 votes |
| Connecticut at-large 5 seats | Benjamin Huntington | Pro-Administration | 1788 | Incumbent lost re-election. Pro-Administration hold. | |
| Connecticut at-large 5 seats | Jonathan Sturges | Pro-Administration | 1788 | Incumbent re-elected. | |
| Connecticut at-large 5 seats | Jonathan Trumbull Jr. | Pro-Administration | 1788 | Incumbent re-elected. | |
| Connecticut at-large 5 seats | Jeremiah Wadsworth | Pro-Administration | 1788 | Incumbent lost re-election. Pro-Administration hold. Winner declined to serve; the incumbent was re-elected in a special election. | |

There were two subsequent special elections. The first was held to fill the vacancy left by Pierpont Edwards (Pro-Admin.) declining to serve and was won by Jeremiah Wadsworth (Pro-Admin.). The second was held September 19, 1791, to fill the vacancy left by Roger Sherman (Pro-Admin.)'s election to the Senate and was won by Amasa Learned (Pro-Admin.).

== Delaware ==
| District | Incumbent | | | This race | |
| District | Member | Party | First elected | Results | Candidates (Note: Only candidates with at least 1% of the vote listed) |
|---|---|---|---|---|---|
| Delaware at-large | John Vining | Pro- Administration | 1789 | Incumbent re-elected. | ▌ ✓ John Vining (Pro-Admin.) 50.3%; ▌Joshua Clayton (Pro-Admin.) 28.9%; ▌Thomas Duff 20.8% |

== Georgia ==
Georgia switched to a conventional district system for the Second Congress. At the time, the districts were not numbered, but are retroactively renumbered as the 1st, 2nd, and 3rd respectively here.

| District | Incumbent | | | This race | |
| District | Member | Party | First elected | Results | Candidates |
|---|---|---|---|---|---|
| Georgia 1 "Southern (or Eastern) District" | James Jackson | Anti- Administration | 1789 | Incumbent lost re-election. Anti-Administration hold. Election was subsequently successfully challenged, and the seat was declared vacant. | ▌ ✓ Anthony Wayne (Anti-Admin.) 50.4%; ▌James Jackson (Anti-Admin.) 49.5%; Others 0.2% |
| Georgia 2 "Middle District" | Abraham Baldwin | Anti- Administration | 1789 | Incumbent re-elected. | ▌ ✓ Abraham Baldwin (Anti-Admin.) 56.2%; ▌Thomas P. Carnes (Anti-Admin.); ▌James Jackson (Anti-Admin.) 1.2%; ▌John Jones (Unknown) 0.3% |
| Georgia 3 "Northern (or Western) District" | George Mathews | Anti- Administration | 1789 | Incumbent lost re-election. Anti-Administration hold. | ▌ ✓ Francis Willis (Anti-Admin.) 66.5%; ▌George Mathews (Anti-Admin.) 33.5% |

== Kentucky ==
Kentucky was admitted during the 2nd Congress and elected its first representatives in 1792.

== Maryland ==
Under Maryland law for the election for the 1st and 2nd Congresses "candidates were elected at-large but had to be residents of a specific district with the statewide vote determining winners from each district."

In Maryland, two local factions briefly emerged, the Chesapeake and Potomac (or Potowmack) "parties". The Potomac faction, consisting of individuals from the small counties of southern Maryland and the Eastern Shore, aimed to maintain their status by curbing the increasing influence of the city of Baltimore and the more populous counties. To do so, they supported the development of the federal city and a canal on the Potomac River to secure their economic future. Conversely, the Chesapeake faction advocated for Baltimore's growth. Their strategy involved improving the Susquehanna River to channel the lucrative wheat trade from western Maryland and Pennsylvania through Baltimore. They also believed that political representation should reflect population growth patterns rather than be defined by the counties. They feared that a canal on the Potomac River would undermine Baltimore's prosperity by diverting trade to competitors like Georgetown, the proposed federal city, and Alexandria.

Temporarily setting aside differences at the national level, the "Chesapeake Ticket" was formed to punish incumbents who had supported the Potomac location for the proposed federal city. A "Potomac Ticket" was organized and led by Governor Smallwood. Turnout in Baltimore was around 99%, and almost every ballot was cast for the Chesapeake Ticket. Statewide, the ticket won an overwhelming majority, securing all six seats. This victory threatened the county-based rural oligarchy, prompting the House of Delegates to transition from a mixed system to a district-based system on December 19, 1790. Under this new system, all of Baltimore's votes would go to just one representative, Harford County was grouped with Kent and Cecil Counties, and Anne Arundel County was grouped with Prince George's County and Annapolis. With the base of the Chesapeake "party" split between three districts, the Chesapeake faction would disappear. The political pattern created by this division would, however, "linger on indefinitely."

| District | Incumbent | | | This race | |
| District | Member | Party | First elected | Results | Candidates |
|---|---|---|---|---|---|
| Maryland 1 | Michael J. Stone | Anti- Administration | 1789 | Incumbent lost re-election. Pro-Administration gain. | ▌ ✓ Philip Key (Chesapeake; Pro-Admin.) 56.8%; ▌Michael J. Stone (Potomac; Anti-Admin.) 43.2% |
| Maryland 2 | Joshua Seney | Anti- Administration | 1789 | Incumbent re-elected. | ▌ ✓ Joshua Seney (Chesapeake; Anti-Admin.) 57.1%; ▌James Tilghman (Potomac) 42.9% |
| Maryland 3 | Benjamin Contee | Anti- Administration | 1789 | Incumbent lost re-election. Pro-Administration gain. Winner later resigned due to questions of eligibility due to his residence and was replaced in a special election by John Francis Mercer (Anti-Admin.). | ▌ ✓ William Pinkney (Chesapeake; Pro-Admin.) 61.6%; ▌Benjamin Contee (Potomac; Anti-Admin.) 38.4% |
| Maryland 4 | William Smith | Anti- Administration | 1789 | Incumbent retired. Anti-Administration hold. | ▌ ✓ Samuel Sterett (Chesapeake; Anti-Admin.) 100% |
| Maryland 5 | George Gale | Pro- Administration | 1789 | Incumbent lost re-election. Pro-Administration hold. | ▌ ✓ William Vans Murray (Chesapeake; Pro-Admin.) 56.4%; ▌George Gale (Potomac; Pro-Admin.) 43.6% |
| Maryland 6 | Daniel Carroll | Pro- Administration | 1789 | Incumbent lost re-election. Anti-Administration gain. | ▌ ✓ Upton Sheredine (Chesapeake; Anti-Admin.) 55.5%; ▌Daniel Carroll (Potomac; Pro-Admin.) 44.5% |

== Massachusetts ==
Massachusetts law required a majority for election. This condition was met in four of the eight districts, the remaining four required between 2 and 9 ballots for election.

| District | Incumbent | | | This race | |
| District | Member | Party | First elected | Results | Candidates |
|---|---|---|---|---|---|
| Massachusetts 1 | Fisher Ames | Pro- Administration | 1788 | Incumbent re-elected. | ▌ ✓ Fisher Ames (Pro-Admin.) 75.1%; ▌Benjamin Austin (Anti-Admin.) 16.1%; ▌Thomas Dawes (Anti-Admin.) 8.8% |
| Massachusetts 2 | Benjamin Goodhue | Pro- Administration | 1789 | Incumbent re-elected. | ▌ ✓ Benjamin Goodhue (Pro-Admin.) 88.8%; ▌Samuel Holten (Anti-Admin) 11.2% |
| Massachusetts 3 | Elbridge Gerry | Anti- Administration | 1789 | Incumbent re-elected. | ▌ ✓ Elbridge Gerry (Anti-Admin.) 60.4%; ▌Nathaniel Gorham (Pro-Admin.) 39.6% |
| Massachusetts 4 | Theodore Sedgwick | Pro- Administration | 1789 | Incumbent re-elected. | ▌ ✓ Theodore Sedgwick (Pro-Admin.) 75.0%; ▌Samuel Lyman (Pro-Admin.) 16.3%; Scattering 8.7% |
| Massachusetts 5 | George Partridge | Pro- Administration | 1788 | Incumbent resigned August 14, 1790. Pro-Administration hold. | First ballot (October 4, 1790): ▌Shearjashub Bourne (Pro-Admin.) 41.8%; ▌Thomas Davis (Unknown) 37.3%; ▌Joshua Thomas (Unknown) 20.9%; Second ballot (November 26, 1790): ▌ ✓ Shearjashub Bourne (Pro-Admin.) 65.3%; ▌Joshua Thomas (Unknown) 27.2%; ▌Thomas Davis (Unknown) 7.5% |
| Massachusetts 6 | George Leonard; Redistricted from the 7th district | Pro- Administration | 1788 | Incumbent re-elected. | First ballot (October 4, 1790): ▌Walter Spooner (Unknown) 25.5%; ▌Phanuel Bishop (Anti-Admin.) 22.6%; ▌George Leonard (Pro-Admin.) 22.3%; ▌Peleg Coffin Jr. (Pro-Admin.) 16.7%; ▌David Cobb (Pro-Admin.) 12.9%; Second ballot (November 26, 1790): ▌Walter Spooner (Unknown) 24.8%; ▌Phanuel Bishop (Anti-Admin.) 28.4%; ▌Peleg Coffin Jr. (Pro-Admin.) 25.7%; ▌George Leonard (Pro-Admin.) 12.5%; ▌David Cobb (Pro-Admin.) 8.6%; Third ballot (January 25, 1791): ▌Phanuel Bishop (Anti-Admin.) 33.9%; ▌Walter Spooner (Unknown) 28.3%; ▌Peleg Coffin Jr. (Pro-Admin.) 24.0%; ▌George Leonard (Pro-Admin.) 8.5%; ▌David Cobb (Pro-Admin.) 5.3%; Fourth ballot (April 4, 1791): ▌Walter Spooner (Unknown) 38.8%; ▌Phanuel Bishop (Anti-Admin.) 38.8%; ▌Peleg Coffin Jr. (Pro-Admin.) 15.7%; ▌George Leonard (Pro-Admin.) 5.3%; ▌David Cobb (Pro-Admin.) 1.5%; Fifth ballot (July 18, 1791): ▌Phanuel Bishop (Anti-Admin.) 42.3%; ▌George Leonard (Pro-Admin.) 29.3%; ▌Peleg Coffin Jr. (Pro-Admin.) 21.8%; ▌Walter Spooner (Unknown) 6.6%; Sixth ballot (September 8, 1791): ▌Phanuel Bishop (Anti-Admin.) 42.2%; ▌George Leonard (Pro-Admin.) 41.6%; ▌Peleg Coffin Jr. (Pro-Admin.) 16.2%; Seventh ballot (November 11, 1791): ▌George Leonard (Pro-Admin.) 45.6%; ▌Phanuel Bishop (Anti-Admin.) 32.0%; ▌Peleg Coffin Jr. (Pro-Admin.) 22.5%; Eighth ballot (December 26, 1791): ▌George Leonard (Pro-Admin.) 45.0%; ▌Phanuel Bishop (Anti-Admin.) 31.6%; ▌Peleg Coffin Jr. (Pro-Admin.) 22.2%; Ninth ballot (April 2, 1792): ▌ ✓ George Leonard (Pro-Admin.) 55.6%; ▌Phanuel Bishop (Anti-Admin.) 27.7%; ▌Peleg Coffin Jr. (Pro-Admin.) 16.7% |
| Massachusetts 7 | Jonathan Grout; Redistricted from the 8th district | Anti- Administration | 1789 | Incumbent lost re-election. Pro-Administration gain. | First ballot (October 4, 1790): ▌Jonathan Grout (Anti-Admin.) 39.1%; ▌Artemas Ward (Pro-Admin.) 39.0%; ▌John Sprague (Unknown) 14.5%; ▌Nathan Tyler (Unknown) 7.4%; Second ballot (November 26, 1790): ▌ ✓ Artemas Ward (Pro-Admin.) 56.6%; ▌Jonathan Grout (Anti-Admin.) 43.4% |
| Massachusetts 8 | George Thatcher; Redistricted from the 6th district | Pro- Administration | 1788 | Incumbent re-elected. | First ballot (October 4, 1790): ▌George Thatcher (Pro-Admin.) 37.2%; ▌William Lithgow (Unknown) 22.3%; ▌Nathaniel Wells (Pro-Admin.) 16.1%; ▌Josiah Thatcher (Unknown) 9.2%; ▌William Martin (Unknown) 4.9%; ▌Arthur Noble (Unknown) 3.6%; ▌Daniel Davis (Unknown) 1.8%; ▌Peleg Wadsworth (Pro-Admin.) 1.5%; Second ballot (November 26, 1790): ▌George Thatcher (Pro-Admin.) 49.8%; ▌Nathaniel Wells (Pro-Admin.) 31.0%; ▌William Lithgow (Unknown) 14.8%; Scattering 4.4%; Third ballot (January 25, 1791): ▌George Thatcher (Pro-Admin.) 49.1%; ▌William Lithgow (Unknown) 39.7%; ▌Nathaniel Wells (Pro-Admin.) 11.2%; Fourth ballot (April 4, 1791): ▌ ✓ George Thatcher (Pro-Admin.) 52.3%; ▌William Lithgow (Unknown) 41.1%; ▌Nathaniel Wells (Pro-Admin.) 6.6% |

== New Hampshire ==
| District | Incumbent | | | This race | |
| District | Member | Party | First elected | Results | Candidates |
|---|---|---|---|---|---|
| New Hampshire at-large 3 seats on a general ticket | Abiel Foster | Pro-Administration | 1789 (special) | Incumbent lost re-election. Pro-Administration hold. | ▌ ✓ Samuel Livermore (Pro-Admin.) 25.1%; ▌ ✓ Jeremiah Smith (Pro-Admin.) 13.1%; ▌ ✓ Nicholas Gilman (Pro-Admin.) 11.8%; ▌John S. Sherburne (Anti-Admin.) 11.1%; ▌Abiel Foster (Pro-Admin.) 8.5%; ▌James Sheafe (Pro-Admin.) 7.8%; ▌Nathaniel Peabody (Pro-Admin.) 7.0%; Others 15.5% |
| New Hampshire at-large 3 seats on a general ticket | Samuel Livermore | Anti-Administration | 1789 | Incumbent re-elected as Pro-Administration. | ▌ ✓ Samuel Livermore (Pro-Admin.) 25.1%; ▌ ✓ Jeremiah Smith (Pro-Admin.) 13.1%; ▌ ✓ Nicholas Gilman (Pro-Admin.) 11.8%; ▌John S. Sherburne (Anti-Admin.) 11.1%; ▌Abiel Foster (Pro-Admin.) 8.5%; ▌James Sheafe (Pro-Admin.) 7.8%; ▌Nathaniel Peabody (Pro-Admin.) 7.0%; Others 15.5% |
| New Hampshire at-large 3 seats on a general ticket | Nicholas Gilman | Pro-Administration | 1789 | Incumbent re-elected. | ▌ ✓ Samuel Livermore (Pro-Admin.) 25.1%; ▌ ✓ Jeremiah Smith (Pro-Admin.) 13.1%; ▌ ✓ Nicholas Gilman (Pro-Admin.) 11.8%; ▌John S. Sherburne (Anti-Admin.) 11.1%; ▌Abiel Foster (Pro-Admin.) 8.5%; ▌James Sheafe (Pro-Admin.) 7.8%; ▌Nathaniel Peabody (Pro-Admin.) 7.0%; Others 15.5% |

== New Jersey ==
| District | Incumbent | | | This race | |
| District | Member | Party | First elected | Results | Candidates |
|---|---|---|---|---|---|
| New Jersey at-large 4 seats on a general ticket | Elias Boudinot | Pro- Administration | 1789 | Incumbent re-elected. | ▌ ✓ Abraham Clark (Pro-Admin.) 19.9%; ▌ ✓ Jonathan Dayton (Pro-Admin.) 13.8%; ▌ ✓ Elias Boudinot (Pro-Admin.) 13.7%; ▌ ✓ Aaron Kitchell (Pro-Admin.) 8.8%; ▌Lambert Cadwalader (Pro-Admin.) 7.0%; ▌James Linn (Anti-Admin.) 5.5%; ▌Thomas Sinnickson (Pro-Admin.) 5.1%; ▌Robert Hoops (Unknown) 4.9%; ▌Thomas Henderson (Pro-Admin.) 3.7%; ▌John Witherspoon (Unknown) 2.7%; ▌John Beatty (Pro-Admin.) 2.3%; Others: ▌John Sheppard (Unknown) 1.9%; ▌Joseph Ellis (Unknown) 1.7%; ▌Robert Ogden (Unknown) 1.5%; ▌James Schureman (Pro-Admin.) 1.5%; ▌John Harring (Unknown) 1.1%; ▌John Hugg (Unknown) 1.1% |
| New Jersey at-large 4 seats on a general ticket | Lambert Cadwalader | Pro- Administration | 1789 | Incumbent lost re-election. Pro-Administration hold. | |
| New Jersey at-large 4 seats on a general ticket | James Schureman | Pro- Administration | 1789 | Incumbent lost re-election. Pro-Administration hold. | |
| New Jersey at-large 4 seats on a general ticket | Thomas Sinnickson | Pro- Administration | 1789 | Incumbent lost re-election. Pro-Administration hold. | |

== New York ==
New York's districts were not numbered at the time, therefore the numbering here is retroactive.

| District | Incumbent | | | This race | |
| District | Member | Party | First elected | Results | Candidates |
|---|---|---|---|---|---|
| New York 1 | William Floyd | Anti- Administration | 1789 | Incumbent lost re-election. Pro-Administration gain. Winner died May 24, 1790, before the start of the 2nd Congress. A special election was then held (see above). | ▌ ✓ James Townsend (Pro-Admin.) 35.5%; ▌John Vanderbilt (Pro-Admin.) 19.6%; ▌William Floyd (Anti-Admin.) 19.1%; ▌Thomas Tredwell (Anti-Admin.) 17.0%; ▌Ezra L'Hommedieu (Anti-Admin.) 8.8% |
| New York 2 | John Laurance | Pro- Administration | 1789 | Incumbent re-elected. | ▌ ✓ John Laurance (Pro-Admin.) 98.4%; ▌Melancton Smith (Anti-Admin.) 1.6% |
| New York 3 | Egbert Benson | Pro- Administration | 1789 | Incumbent re-elected. | ▌ ✓ Egbert Benson (Pro-Admin.) 60.8%; ▌Theodorus Bailey (Anti-Admin.) 39.2% |
| New York 4 | John Hathorn | Anti- Administration | 1789 | Incumbent lost re-election. Anti-Administration hold. | ▌ ✓ Cornelius C. Schoonmaker (Anti-Admin.) 52.1%; ▌Peter Van Gaasbeck (Pro-Admin.) 43.7%; ▌John Hathorn (Anti-Admin.) 3.5%; ▌Christopher Tappen (Anti-Admin.) 0.8% |
| New York 5 | Peter Silvester | Pro- Administration | 1789 | Incumbent re-elected. | ▌ ✓ Peter Silvester (Pro-Admin.) 58.4%; ▌John Livingston (Anti-Admin.) 41.6% |
| New York 6 | Jeremiah Van Rensselaer | Anti- Administration | 1789 | Incumbent lost re-election. Pro-Administration gain. | ▌ ✓ James Gordon (Pro-Admin.) 59.0%; ▌Jeremiah Van Rensselaer (Anti-Admin.) 41.0% |

== North Carolina ==
North Carolina ratified the Constitution November 21, 1789, and elected its representatives after admission.

=== 1st Congress ===
| District | Incumbent | | | This race | |
| District | Member | Party | First elected | Results | Candidates |
|---|---|---|---|---|---|
| North Carolina 1 "Roanoke division" | State ratified the Constitution; November 21, 1789. | | | First member elected March 24, 1790. Anti-Administration win. Winner was later elected to the next term; see below. | ▌ ✓ John B. Ashe (Anti-Admin.) 48.9%; ▌Nathaniel Macon (Anti-Admin.) 41.5%; ▌Stephen Moore (Unknown) 8.9%; ▌Parsons (Note: Source does not give first name) (Unknown) 0.7% |
| North Carolina 2 "Edenton and New Bern division" | State ratified the Constitution; November 21, 1789. | | | First member elected March 24, 1790. Anti-Administration win. Winner was later elected to the next term; see below. | ▌ ✓ Hugh Williamson (Anti-Admin.) 73.9%; ▌Stephen Cabarrus (Unknown) 26.0% |
| North Carolina 3 "Cape Fear division" | State ratified the Constitution; November 21, 1789. | | | First member elected March 24, 1790. Anti-Administration win. Winner later lost re-election to the next term; see below. | ▌ ✓ Timothy Bloodworth (Anti-Admin.) 98.4%; ▌Benjamin Smith (Unknown) 1.6% |
| North Carolina 4 "Yadkin division" | State ratified the Constitution; November 21, 1789. | | | First member elected March 24, 1790. Pro-Administration win. Winner was later elected to the next term; see below. | ▌ ✓ John Steele (Pro-Admin.) (Note: Source does not give numbers of votes or has incomplete data); ▌Joseph MacDowell (Unknown); ▌Waightstill Avery (Unknown) |
| North Carolina 5 "Western division" | State ratified the Constitution; November 21, 1789. | | | First member elected March 24, 1790. Pro-Administration win. District covered areas that were ceded to in May 1790 to form the Southwest Territory, but member retained seat for the remainder of term. | ▌ ✓ John Sevier (Pro-Admin.) |

=== 2nd Congress ===
Due to the cession of North Carolina's trans-Appalachian territory to form the Southwest Territory, the territory of the old 5th district was lost. North Carolina retained the same number of Representatives, and so it redistricted for the Second Congress.

| District | Incumbent | | | This race | |
| District | Member | Party | First elected | Results | Candidates |
|---|---|---|---|---|---|
| North Carolina 1 "Yadkin Division" | John Steele; Redistricted from the 4th district | Pro- Administration | 1790 | Incumbent re-elected. | ▌ ✓ John Steele (Pro-Admin.) 87.3%; ▌Joseph MacDowell (Anti-Admin.) 12.7% |
| North Carolina 2 "Centre Division" | None (new district) | | | New seat. Anti-Administration gain. | ▌ ✓ Nathaniel Macon (Anti-Admin.); ▌Alexander Mebane (Anti-Admin.) |
| North Carolina 3 | John Baptista Ashe; Redistricted from the 1st district | Anti- Administration | 1790 | Incumbent re-elected. | ▌ ✓ Jonathan B. Ashe (Anti-Admin.) |
| North Carolina 4 "Albemarle Division" | Hugh Williamson; Redistricted from the 2nd district | Anti- Administration | 1790 | Incumbent re-elected. | ▌ ✓ Hugh Williamson (Anti-Admin.) (Note: Changed from Pro-Administration to Anti-Administration between the 1st and 2nd Congresses); ▌Charles Johnson (Anti-Admin.) |
| North Carolina 5 "Cape Fear Division" | Timothy Bloodworth; Redistricted from the 3rd district | Anti- Administration | 1790 | Incumbent lost re-election. Pro-Administration gain. | ▌ ✓ William B. Grove (Pro-Admin.) 65.2%; ▌Timothy Bloodworth (Anti-Admin.) 34.6%; ▌Benjamin Smith (Pro-Admin.) 0.2% |

== Pennsylvania ==
Pennsylvania had elected its Representatives at-large in the 1st Congress, but switched to using districts in the 2nd Congress. Five incumbents ran for re-election, four of whom won, while three others retired leaving three open seats. Two districts had no incumbents residing in them, while one (the 8th district) had a single representative who declined to run for re-election and one (the 2nd district) had three incumbents, only one of whom ran for re-election.

| District | Incumbent | | | This race | |
| District | Member | Party | First elected | Results | Candidates |
|---|---|---|---|---|---|
| Pennsylvania 1 | Thomas Fitzsimons; Redistricted from the at-large district | Pro-Administration | 1788 | Incumbent re-elected. | ▌ ✓ Thomas Fitzsimons (Pro-Admin.) 85.1%; ▌Charles Thomson (Anti-Admin.) 14.9% |
| Pennsylvania 2 | Frederick Muhlenberg; Redistricted from the at-large district | Pro-Administration | 1788 | Incumbent re-elected. | ▌ ✓ Frederick Muhlenberg (Pro-Admin.); ▌Amos Greg (Anti-Admin.); ▌"Dr." Jones (Unknown) |
| Pennsylvania 2 | George Clymer; Redistricted from the at-large district | Pro-Administration | 1788 | Incumbent retired. Pro-Administration loss. | ▌ ✓ Frederick Muhlenberg (Pro-Admin.); ▌Amos Greg (Anti-Admin.); ▌"Dr." Jones (Unknown) |
| Pennsylvania 2 | Henry Wynkoop; Redistricted from the at-large district | Pro-Administration | 1788 | Incumbent retired. Pro-Administration loss. | ▌ ✓ Frederick Muhlenberg (Pro-Admin.); ▌Amos Greg (Anti-Admin.); ▌"Dr." Jones (Unknown) |
| Pennsylvania 3 | Peter Muhlenberg; Redistricted from the at-large district | Anti-Administration | 1788 | Incumbent lost re-election. Pro-Administration gain. | ▌ ✓ Israel Jacobs (Pro-Admin.) 61.2%; ▌Peter Muhlenberg (Anti-Admin.) 38.8% |
| Pennsylvania 4 | Daniel Hiester; Redistricted from the at-large district | Anti-Administration | 1788 | Incumbent re-elected. | ▌ ✓ Daniel Hiester (Anti-Admin.) 100% |
| Pennsylvania 5 | None (new district) | | | New seat. Pro-Administration gain. | ▌ ✓ John W. Kittera (Pro-Admin.) 100% |
| Pennsylvania 6 | None (new district) | | | New seat. Anti-Administration gain. | ▌ ✓ Andrew Gregg (Anti-Admin.) 51.2%; ▌John Allison (Pro-Admin.) 18.3%; ▌James McLean (Anti-Admin.) 10.9%; ▌Thomas Johnston (Pro-Admin.) 10.3%; ▌William Montgomery (Anti-Admin.) 9.3% |
| Pennsylvania 7 | Thomas Hartley; Redistricted from the at-large district | Pro-Administration | 1788 | Incumbent re-elected. | ▌ ✓ Thomas Hartley (Pro-Admin.) 71.1%; ▌William Irvine (Anti-Admin.) 28.9% |
| Pennsylvania 8 | Thomas Scott; Redistricted from the at-large district | Pro-Administration | 1788 | Incumbent retired. Anti-Administration gain. | ▌ ✓ William Findley (Anti-Admin.) 65.2%; ▌John Woods (Pro-Admin.) 34.8% |

== Rhode Island ==
=== 1st Congress ===
Rhode Island ratified the Constitution May 29, 1790. It elected its representatives after admission.

| District | Incumbent | | | This race | |
| District | Member | Party | First elected | Results | Candidates |
|---|---|---|---|---|---|
| Rhode Island at-large | State ratified the U.S. Constitution May 29, 1790. | | | First member elected August 31, 1790. Pro-Administration win. Winner was later elected to the next term; see below. | ▌ ✓ Benjamin Bourne (Pro-Admin.) 72.7%; ▌Job Comstock (Unknown) 23.2%; ▌James Sheldon (Unknown) 3.4% |

=== 2nd Congress ===
Rhode Island held elections for the 2nd Congress on October 18, 1790, about six weeks after elections for the 1st Congress due to the state's late ratification of the Constitution.

| District | Incumbent | | | This race | |
| District | Member | Party | First elected | Results | Candidates |
|---|---|---|---|---|---|
| Rhode Island at-large | Benjamin Bourne | Pro- Administration | August 1790 | Incumbent re-elected. | ▌ ✓ Benjamin Bourne (Pro-Admin.) 56.6%; ▌Paul Mumford (Unknown) 33.0%; ▌James Sheldon (Unknown) 10.1% |

== South Carolina ==
| District | Incumbent | | | This race | |
| District | Member | Party | First elected | Results | Candidates |
|---|---|---|---|---|---|
| South Carolina 1 "Charleston Division" | William L. Smith | Pro-Administration | 1788 | Incumbent re-elected. | ▌ ✓ William L. Smith (Pro-Admin.) |
| South Carolina 2 "Beaufort Division" | Aedanus Burke | Anti-Administration | 1788 | Unknown if incumbent retired or lost re-election. Pro-Administration gain. | ▌ ✓ Robert Barnwell (Pro-Admin.) |
| South Carolina 3 "Georgetown Division" | Daniel Huger | Pro-Administration | 1788 | Incumbent re-elected. | ▌ ✓ Daniel Huger (Pro-Admin.) |
| South Carolina 4 "Camden Division" | Thomas Sumter | Anti-Administration | 1788 | Incumbent re-elected. | ▌ ✓ Thomas Sumter (Anti-Admin.) |
| South Carolina 5 "Ninety-Six Division" | Thomas Tudor Tucker | Anti-Administration | 1788 | Incumbent re-elected. | ▌ ✓ Thomas Tudor Tucker (Anti-Admin.) |

== Vermont ==
Vermont was admitted at the end of the First Congress, with the admission taking effect at the start of the Second Congress. Vermont was entitled to elect two representatives. Vermont law at the time required a majority to win an office. In the 1st district, no candidate won a majority, necessitating a run-off.

| District | Incumbent | | | This race | |
| District | Member | Party | First elected | Results | Candidates |
|---|---|---|---|---|---|
| Vermont 1 "Western Division" | New state admitted. | | | First member elected. Anti-Administration win. | First ballot (July 13, 1791): ▌Matthew Lyon (Anti-Admin.) 28.7% ▌Israel Smith (Anti-Admin.) 24.6% ▌Isaac Tichenor (Pro-Admin.) 22.7% ▌Samuel Hitchcock (Unknown) 18.1% ▌Ira Allen (Unknown) 2.3% ▌Ebenezer Marvin (Unknown) 1.6% ▌Gideon Olin (Unknown) 1.3% Others 0.7%; Second ballot (September 6, 1791): ▌ ✓ Israel Smith (Anti-Admin.) 68.4%; ▌Matthew Lyon (Anti-Admin.) 29.4%; ▌Isaac Tichenor (Pro-Admin.) 2.2% |
| Vermont 2 "Eastern Division" | New state admitted. | | | First member elected. Anti-Administration win. | ▌ ✓ Nathaniel Niles (Anti-Admin.); ▌Stephen Jacob (Unknown); ▌Daniel Buck (Pro-Admin.) |

== Virginia ==
| District | Incumbent | | | This race | |
| District | Member | Party | First elected | Results | Candidates |
|---|---|---|---|---|---|
| Virginia 1 | Alexander White | Pro-Administration | 1789 | Incumbent re-elected. | ▌ ✓ Alexander White (Pro-Admin.) 93.3%; ▌J. P. Duvall (Unknown) 6.7% |
| Virginia 2 | John Brown | Anti-Administration | 1789 | Incumbent re-elected. | ▌ ✓ John Brown (Anti-Admin.); ▌James M. Marshall (Unknown) |
| Virginia 3 | Andrew Moore | Anti-Administration | 1789 | Incumbent re-elected. | ▌ ✓ Andrew Moore (Anti-Admin.) 100% |
| Virginia 4 | Richard Bland Lee | Pro-Administration | 1789 | Incumbent re-elected. | ▌ ✓ Richard Bland Lee (Pro-Admin.) 62.1%; ▌Arthur Lee (Anti-Admin.) 37.9% |
| Virginia 5 | James Madison | Anti-Administration | 1789 | Incumbent re-elected. | ▌ ✓ James Madison (Anti-Admin.) 97.8%; ▌James Monroe (Anti-Admin.) 2.2% |
| Virginia 6 | Isaac Coles | Anti-Administration | 1789 | Incumbent retired. Anti-Administration hold. | ▌ ✓ Abraham B. Venable (Anti-Admin.); ▌Charles Lintch (Unknown); ▌Charles Clay (Unknown) |
| Virginia 7 | John Page | Anti-Administration | 1789 | Incumbent re-elected. | ▌ ✓ John Page (Anti-Admin.); ▌Meriwether Smith (Unknown); ▌Francis Corbin (Unknown); ▌Henry Lee (Unknown) |
| Virginia 8 | Josiah Parker | Anti-Administration | 1789 | Incumbent re-elected. | ▌ ✓ Josiah Parker (Anti-Admin.) 76.1%; ▌Isaac Avery (Unknown) 23.9% |
| Virginia 9 | William B. Giles | Anti-Administration | 1790 (special) | Incumbent re-elected. | ▌ ✓ William B. Giles (Anti-Admin.) 59.3%; ▌Thomas Edmonds (Pro-Admin.) 40.6%; ▌John Mason (Unknown) 0.1% |
| Virginia 10 | Samuel Griffin | Pro-Administration | 1789 | Incumbent re-elected as Anti-Administration. | ▌ ✓ Samuel Griffin (Anti-Admin.) (Note: and Had been Pro-Administration previous electionwould switch back to Pro-Administration in the next election) |

== See also ==
- 1790 United States elections
  - List of United States House of Representatives elections (1789–1822)
  - 1790–91 United States Senate elections
- 1st United States Congress
- 2nd United States Congress

== Bibliography ==
- "A New Nation Votes: American Election Returns 1787-1825". Tufts Digital Library, Tufts University. Archived from the original on January 29, 2015.
- Dubin, Michael J. (March 1, 1998). 1788 United States Congressional Elections-1997: The Official Results of the Elections of the 1st Through 105th Congresses. McFarland and Company. ISBN 978-0786402830.
- Martis, Kenneth C. (January 1, 1989). The Historical Atlas of Political Parties in the United States Congress, 1789-1989. Macmillan Publishing Company. ISBN 978-0029201701.
- "Party Divisions of the House of Representatives* 1789–Present". Office of the Historian, United States House of Representatives.
- Mapping Early American Elections project team (2019). "Mapping Early American Elections". Roy Rosenzweig Center for History and New Media, George Mason University.
