= List of United States representatives in the 3rd Congress =

This is a complete list of United States representatives during the 3rd United States Congress listed by seniority. For the most part, representatives are ranked by the beginning of their terms in office.

As an historical article, the districts and party affiliations listed reflect those during the 3rd Congress (March 4, 1793 – March 3, 1795). Seats and party affiliations on similar lists for other congresses will be different for certain members.

This article describes the criteria for seniority in the House of Representatives and sets out the list of members by seniority. It is prepared on the basis of the interpretation of seniority applied to the House of Representatives in the current congress. In the absence of information to the contrary, it is presumed that the twenty-first-century practice is identical to the seniority customs used during the 3rd Congress.

== House seniority ==
Seniority in the House, for representatives with unbroken service, depends on the date on which the members first term began. That date is either the start of the Congress (4 March in odd numbered years, for the era up to and including the 73rd Congress starting in 1933) or the date of a special election during the Congress. Since many members start serving on the same day as others, ranking between them is based on alphabetical order by the last name of the representative.

Representatives in early congresses were often elected after the legal start of the Congress. Such representatives are attributed with unbroken seniority, from the legal start of the congressional term, if they were the first person elected to a seat in a Congress. The date of the election is indicated in a note.

The seniority date is normally taken from the members entry in the Biographical Directory of the United States Congress, except where the date given is the legal start of the Congress and the actual election (for someone who was not the first person elected to the seat in that Congress) was later. The date of election is taken from United States Congressional Elections 1788-1997. In a few instances the latter work provides dates, for the start and end of terms, which correct those in the Biographical Directory.

The Biographical Directory normally uses the date of a special election, as the seniority date. However, mostly in early congresses, the date of the member taking his seat can be the one given. The date of the special election is mentioned in a note to the list below, when that date is not used as the seniority date by the Biographical Directory.

Representatives who return to the House, after having previously served, are credited with service equal to one less than the total number of terms they served. When a representative has served a prior term of less than two terms (i.e., prior term minus one equals less than one), he is ranked above all others whose service begins on the same day.

== Leadership ==
In this Congress the only formal leader was the speaker of the House. A speakership ballot was held on December 2, 1793 and Frederick Muhlenberg (A-PA) was elected. Speaker Muhlenberg had previously held the same office, in the 1st Congress.

== Standing committees ==
The House created its first standing committee, on April 13, 1789. There were two standing committees in the 3rd Congress. In addition there was a Ways and Means Committee in the 1st session. Although the Ways and Means Committee was not formally added to the list of standing committees until 1802, the 2011 committee considers the one in 1794 to be a forerunner.

Committees, in this period, were appointed for a session at a time and not necessarily for every one in a Congress. The speaker appointed the members.

This list refers to the standing committees of the House in the 3rd Congress, the year of establishment as a standing committee, the number of members assigned to the committee and the dates of appointment in each session, the end of the session and its chairman.

No.	Committee	From	Members	Appointed	Chairman
1	Claims	1794	7	November 14, 1794 – March 3, 1795	Uriah Tracy (P-CT)
2	Elections	1789	7	December 2, 1793 – June 9, 1794	William L. Smith (P-SC)
2	Elections	1789	7	November 7, 1794 – March 3, 1795	Jonathan Dayton (P-NJ)
3	Ways and Means	[1794]	15	March 26, 1794 – June 9, 1794	William L. Smith (P-SC)

== List of representatives by seniority ==
A numerical rank is assigned to each of the 105 members initially elected to the 3rd Congress. Other members, who were not the first person elected to a seat but who joined the House during the Congress, are not assigned a number.

Three representatives-elect were not sworn in, as one resigned to become a United States Senator and two declined to serve. The list below includes the representative-elect (with names in italics), with the seniority they would have held if they had been sworn in.

Party designations used in this article are A for Anti-Administration members and P for Pro-Administration representatives.

Rank	Representative	Party	District	Seniority date	Notes
Three consecutive terms
1	Fisher Ames	P	MA-1a	March 4, 1789	
2	Abraham Baldwin	A	GA-al	March 4, 1789	
3	Elias Boudinot	P	NJ-al	March 4, 1789	Last term.
4	Thomas Fitzsimons	P	PA-al	March 4, 1789	Last term.
5	Nicholas Gilman	P	NH-al	March 4, 1789	
6	Benjamin Goodhue	P	MA-1c	March 4, 1789	
7	Samuel Griffin	P	VA-13	March 4, 1789	Anti-Administration 1791–93. Elected to this Congress: March 18, 1793. Last term.
8	Thomas Hartley	P	PA-al	March 4, 1789	
9	Daniel Hiester	A	PA-al	March 4, 1789	
10	Richard B. Lee	P	VA-17	March 4, 1789	Elected to this Congress: March 18, 1793. Last term.
11	James Madison	A	VA-15	March 4, 1789	Elected to this Congress: March 18, 1793
12	Andrew Moore	A	VA-2	March 4, 1789	Elected to this Congress: March 18, 1793
13	Frederick Muhlenberg	A	PA-al	March 4, 1789	Pro-Administration 1789–91. Speaker of the House.
14	John Page	A	VA-12	March 4, 1789	Elected to this Congress: March 18, 1793
15	Josiah Parker	P	VA-11	March 4, 1789	Anti-Administration 1789–93. Elected to this Congress: March 18, 1793.
16	Theodore Sedgwick	P	MA-2c	March 4, 1789	
17	William L. Smith	P	SC-1	March 4, 1789	Chairman: Elections (1793). Chairman: Ways and Means (1794).
18	Jonathan Sturges	P	CT-al	March 4, 1789	Declined to serve, as Representative-elect, before the start of the Congress.
19	George Thatcher	P	MA-4b	March 4, 1789	
20	Jonathan Trumbull, Jr.	P	CT-al	March 4, 1789	Last term (elected to 4th Congress but did not serve)
21	Jeremiah Wadsworth	P	CT-al	March 4, 1789	Last term.
22	William B. Giles	A	VA-9	December 7, 1790	Elected to this Congress: March 18, 1793
23	Benjamin Bourne	P	RI-al	December 17, 1790	
Two consecutive terms
24	Shearjashub Bourne	P	MA-3a	March 4, 1791	Last term.
25	Abraham Clark	P	NJ-al	March 4, 1791	Died on September 15, 1794.
26	Jonathan Dayton	P	NJ-al	March 4, 1791	Chairman: Elections (1794)
27	William Findley	A	PA-al	March 4, 1791	
28	James Gordon	P	NY-9	March 4, 1791	Last term.
29	Andrew Gregg	A	PA-al	March 4, 1791	
30	William B. Grove	P	NC-7	March 4, 1791	
31	James Hillhouse	P	CT-al	March 4, 1791	
32	John W. Kittera	P	PA-al	March 4, 1791	
33	Nathaniel Macon	A	NC-5	March 4, 1791	
34	William V. Murray	P	MD-8	March 4, 1791	
35	Jeremiah Smith	P	NH-al	March 4, 1791	
36	Abraham B. Venable	A	VA-7	March 4, 1791	Elected to this Congress: March 18, 1793
37	Artemas Ward	P	MA-2d	March 4, 1791	Last term.
38	Amasa Learned	P	CT-al	September 19, 1791	Last term.
39	Nathaniel Niles	A	VT-2	October 17, 1791	Last term.
40	Israel Smith	A	VT-1	October 17, 1791	Elected to this Congress: March 20, 1793
41	Thomas Tredwell	A	NY-1	October 24, 1791	Last term.
42	John F. Mercer	A	MD-2	February 5, 1792	Resigned on April 13, 1794.
43	Alexander D. Orr	A	KY-2	November 8, 1792	Elected to this Congress: September 6, 1793
44	Christopher Greenup	A	KY-1	November 9, 1792	Elected to this Congress: September 6, 1793
45	William Hindman	P	MD-7	January 30, 1793	
Two non-consecutive terms
46	Lambert Cadwalader	P	NJ-al	March 4, 1793	Previously served 1789–91. Last term.
47	Isaac Coles	A	VA-6	March 4, 1793	Previously served 1789–91. Elected to this Congress: March 18, 1793.
48	Benjamin Huntington	P	CT-al	March 4, 1793	Previously served 1789–91. Declined to serve, as Representative-elect, before Congress convened.
49	Peter Muhlenberg	A	PA-al	March 4, 1793	Previously served 1789–91. Last term until 6th Congress.
50	Thomas Scott	P	PA-al	March 4, 1793	Previously served 1789–91. Last term.
One term
51	James Armstrong	P	PA-al	March 4, 1793	Only term.
52	Theodorus Bailey	A	NY-5	March 4, 1793	
53	John Beatty	P	NJ-al	March 4, 1793	Only term.
54	Lemuel Benton	A	SC-3	March 4, 1793	
55	Thomas Blount	A	NC-9	March 4, 1793	
56	Thomas P. Carnes	A	GA-al	March 4, 1793	Only term.
57	Gabriel Christie	A	MD-6	March 4, 1793	
58	Thomas Claiborne	A	VA-8	March 4, 1793	Elected to this Congress: March 18, 1793
59	David Cobb	P	MA-al	March 4, 1793	Only term.
60	Peleg Coffin, Jr.	P	MA-3b	March 4, 1793	Only term.
61	William J. Dawson	A	NC-8	March 4, 1793	Only term.
62	Henry Dearborn	A	MA-4a	March 4, 1793	
63	George Dent	P	MD-1	March 4, 1793	
64	Samuel Dexter	P	MA-1b	March 4, 1793	Only term.
65	Uriah Forrest	P	MD-3	March 4, 1793	Resigned on November 8, 1794.
66	Dwight Foster	P	MA-2a	March 4, 1793	Elected to this Congress: April 1, 1793
67	Ezekiel Gilbert	P	NY-6	March 4, 1793	
68	James Gillespie	A	NC-6	March 4, 1793	
69	Alexander Gillon	A	SC-5	March 4, 1793	Died on October 6, 1794.
70	Henry Glen	P	NY-8	March 4, 1793	
71	George Hancock	P	VA-5	March 4, 1793	Elected to this Congress: March 18, 1793
72	Carter B. Harrison	A	VA-10	March 4, 1793	Elected to this Congress: March 18, 1793
73	John Heath	A	VA-19	March 4, 1793	Elected to this Congress: March 18, 1793
74	Samuel Holten	A	MA-1d	March 4, 1793	Elected to this Congress April 1, 1793. Only term.
75	John Hunter	A	SC-2	March 4, 1793	Only term.
76	William Irvine	A	PA-al	March 4, 1793	Only term.
77	Matthew Locke	A	NC-2	March 4, 1793	
78	William Lyman	A	MA-2b	March 4, 1793	Elected to this Congress: April 1, 1793
79	Francis Malbone	P	RI-al	March 4, 1793	
80	Joseph McDowell	A	NC-1	March 4, 1793	Only term.
81	Alexander Mebane	A	NC-4	March 4, 1793	Only term.
82	Stephen M. Mitchell	P	CT-al	March 4, 1793	Resigned, as Representative-elect, to become US Senator: October, 1793.
83	William Montgomery	A	PA-al	March 4, 1793	Only term.
84	Joseph Neville	A	VA-3	March 4, 1793	Elected to this Congress: March 18, 1793. Only term.
85	Anthony New	A	VA-16	March 4, 1793	Elected to this Congress: March 18, 1793
86	John Nicholas	A	VA-18	March 4, 1793	Elected to this Congress: March 18, 1793
87	John Patten	A	DE-al	March 4, 1793	Unseated after election contest: February 14, 1794. Only term until 4th Congress.
88	Andrew Pickens	A	SC-6	March 4, 1793	Only term.
89	Francis Preston	A	VA-4	March 4, 1793	Elected to this Congress: March 18, 1793
90	Robert Rutherford	A	VA-1	March 4, 1793	Elected to this Congress: March 18, 1793
91	John S. Sherburne	A	NH-al	March 4, 1793	
92	John Smilie	A	PA-al	March 4, 1793	Only term until 6th Congress.
93	Samuel Smith	A	MD-5	March 4, 1793	
94	Thomas Sprigg	A	MD-4	March 4, 1793	
95	Silas Talbot	P	NY-10	March 4, 1793	Resigned in June 1795. Only term.
96	John E. Van Alen	P	NY-7	March 4, 1793	
97	Philip Van Cortlandt	A	NY-3	March 4, 1793	
98	Peter Van Gaasbeck	P	NY-4	March 4, 1793	Only term.
99	Peleg Wadsworth	P	MA-4c	March 4, 1793	Elected to this Congress April 1, 1793
100	Francis Walker	A	VA-14	March 4, 1793	Elected to this Congress: March 18, 1793. Only term.
101	John Watts	P	NY-2	March 4, 1793	Only term.
102	Benjamin Williams	A	NC-10	March 4, 1793	Only term.
103	Paine Wingate	P	NH-al	March 4, 1793	Only term.
104	Richard Winn	A	SC-4	March 4, 1793	
105	Joseph Winston	A	NC-3	March 4, 1793	Only term until 8th Congress.
Members elected after the start of the Congress
–	Uriah Tracy	P	CT-al	April 8, 1793	Special election. Chairman: Claims (1794).
–	Joshua Coit	P	CT-al	November 11, 1793	Special election
–	Zephaniah Swift	P	CT-al	November 11, 1793	Special election
–	Henry Latimer	P	DE-al	February 14, 1794	Seated after election contest. Resigned to become US Senator: February 7, 1795.
–	Gabriel Duvall	A	MD-2	May 5, 1794	Special election
–	Benjamin Edwards	P	MD-3	January 2, 1795	Special election. Only term.
–	Aaron Kitchell	P	NJ-al	January 29, 1795	Previously served 1791–93. Special election.
–	Robert G. Harper	P	SC-5	February 9, 1795	Special election: October 13–14, 1794
Non voting Member
a	James White	—	TN-al	September 4, 1794	Delegate from the Southwest Territory (later TN)

== See also ==
- 3rd United States Congress
- List of United States congressional districts
- List of United States senators in the 3rd Congress
