= List of United States senators in the 3rd Congress =

This is a list of United States senators during the 3rd United States Congress listed by seniority from March 4, 1793, to March 3, 1795.

The order of service is based on the commencement of the senator's first term, with senators entering service the same day ranked alphabetically. The Senate subsequently assigned a consecutive official number to each senator, which is the second number given in the table.

During this time, there were no official parties, but senators are labeled as Pro-Administration (P), and Anti-Administration (A). Towards the end of the Congress, Stevens T. Mason of Virginia is classified in the Chronological List of United States Senators as a Democratic-Republican (DR) and Henry Latimer of Delaware as a Federalist (F).

== Terms of service ==
Class	Terms of service of senators that expired in years
Class 3	Terms of service of senators that expired in 1795 (CT, GA, KY, MD, NC, NH, NY, PA, SC, and VT.)
Class 1	Terms of service of senators that expired in 1797 (CT, DE, MA, MD, NJ, NY, PA, RI, VA, and VT)
Class 2	Terms of service of senators that expired in 1799 (DE, GA, KY, MA, NC, NH, NJ, RI, SC, and VA.)

== U.S. Senate seniority list ==
Rank	Historical rank	Senator (party-state)	Seniority date
1	2	Pierce Butler (A-SC)	March 4, 1789
2	5	Oliver Ellsworth (F-CT)	March 4, 1789
3	9	James Gunn (A-GA)	March 4, 1789
4	10	John Henry (F-MD)	March 4, 1789
5	11	Ralph Izard (F-SC)	March 4, 1789
6	13	John Langdon (A-NH)	March 4, 1789
7	16	Robert Morris (F-PA)	March 4, 1789
8	18	George Read (F-DE)	March 4, 1789
9	19	Caleb Strong (F-MA)	March 4, 1789
10	21	Rufus King (F-NY)	July 16, 1789
11	23	Benjamin Hawkins (F-NC)	November 27, 1789
12	26	Theodore Foster (F-RI)	June 7, 1790
13	28	James Monroe (A-VA)	November 9, 1790
14	30	Aaron Burr (A-NY)	March 4, 1791
15	31	George Cabot (F-MA)	March 4, 1791
16	32	John Rutherfurd (F-NJ)	March 4, 1791
17	33	Roger Sherman (F-CT)	June 13, 1791
18	34	Stephen Row Bradley (A-VT)	October 17, 1791
19	35	Moses Robinson (A-VT)	October 17, 1791
20	36	John Brown (A-KY)	June 18, 1792
21	37	John Edwards (A-KY)	June 18, 1792
22	38	John Taylor of Caroline (A-VA)	October 18, 1792
23	39	Richard Potts (F-MD)	January 10, 1793
24	40	William Bradford (F-RI)	March 4, 1793
25	41	Frederick Frelinghuysen (F-NJ)	March 4, 1793
26	42	James Jackson (A-GA)	March 4, 1793
27	43	Samuel Livermore (F-NH)	March 4, 1793
28	44	Alexander Martin (A-NC)	March 4, 1793
29	45	John Vining (F-DE)	March 4, 1793
	46	Stephen Mix Mitchell (F-CT)	December 2, 1793
30	47	James Ross (F-PA)	April 24, 1794
	48	Stevens Thomson Mason (A-VA)	November 18, 1794
	49	Henry Tazewell (A-VA)	November 18, 1794
	50	Henry Latimer (F-DE)	February 7, 1795

== See also ==
- 3rd United States Congress
- List of United States representatives in the 3rd Congress
