= 1790 Connecticut's at-large congressional district special election =

A special election was held in Connecticut's at-large congressional district on December 16, 1790, to fill a vacancy left when Representative-elect Pierpont Edwards (P) declined to serve.

== Election results ==
Candidate	Party	Votes	Percent
Jeremiah Wadsworth	Pro-Administration	1,222	48.6%
Amasa Learned	Pro-Administration	800	23.9%
Benjamin Huntington	Pro-Administration	333	13.2%
Tapping Reeve		203	8.1%
Stephen M. Mitchell		103	4.1%
James Davenport		37	1.5%
John Chester		17	0.7%

== See also ==
- Special elections to the 1st United States Congress
