= List of Delta Omicron chapters =

Delta Omicron is a co-ed international professional music honors fraternity. It has collegiate chapters, alumni chapters, and alumni clubs.

== Collegiate chapters ==
In the following list, active chapters are indicated in bold and inactive chapters and institutions are in italics.

Chapter	Charter date and range	institution	Location	Status	Ref.
Alpha	September 6, 1909 – 1994	Cincinnati Conservatory of Music	Cincinnati, Ohio	Inactive	
Beta	March 27, 1911 – 1973	Detroit Institute of Musical Arts	Detroit, Michigan	Inactive	
Gamma	April 6, 1911 – 1916	Southern Seminary	Buena Vista, Virginia	Inactive	
Delta	January 9, 1915 – 1953	Denison University	Granville, Ohio	Inactive	
Epsilon	June 16, 1917 – 1942	Morrey School of Music Inc.	Columbus, Ohio	Inactive	
**Zeta**	May 27, 1918	University of Louisville	Louisville, Kentucky	Active	
Eta	December 11, 1918 – 1956	College of Music of Cincinnati	Cincinnati, Ohio	Inactive	
Theta	October 22, 1921	University of Nebraska–Lincoln	Lincoln, Nebraska	Inactive	
Iota	April 20, 1922 – 1925	Gulf Park School for Girls	Gulfport, Mississippi	Inactive	
Kappa	June 26, 1922 – 1931	Des Moines University	West Des Moines, Iowa	Inactive	
Lambda	February 9, 1923	Northwestern University	Evanston, Illinois	Inactive	
Mu	June 2, 1923	Miami University	Oxford, Ohio	Inactive	
Nu	February 7, 1925 – 1931	Marquette College of Music	Milwaukee, Wisconsin	Inactive	
Xi	January 24, 1925 – 1936	University of Michigan	Ann Arbor, Michigan	Inactive	
Omicron	October 3, 1925	Western State College of Colorado	Gunnison, Colorado	Inactive	
Pi	June 10, 1925 – 1941	Bush Conservatory of Music	Chicago, Illinois	Inactive	
Rho	November 7, 1925 – 19xx ?; 1948–1956	Eastman School of Music, University of Rochester	Rochester, New York	Inactive	
Sigma	May 1, 1926	Illinois Wesleyan University	Bloomington, Illinois	Inactive	
Tau	May 17, 1927 – 1933	Millikin Conservatory of Music	Decatur, Illinois	Inactive	
Upsilon	May 8, 1928 – 19xx ?; November 6, 2010	Colorado State University	Fort Collins, Colorado	Inactive	
Phi	June 6, 1928 – 1934	Lawrence Conservatory of Music	Appleton, Wisconsin	Inactive	
Chi	December 13, 1928	Ohio State University	Columbus, Ohio	Inactive	
Psi	March 21, 1929	American Conservatory of Music	Chicago, Illinois	Inactive	
Omega	October 24, 1929 – 1935	Denver Conservatory of Music	Denver, Colorado	Inactive	
Delta Alpha	September 30, 1929 – 1938	Peabody Conservatory of Music	Baltimore, Maryland	Inactive	
Delta Beta	February 7, 1931	Louisiana State University	Baton Rouge, Louisiana	Inactive	
Delta Gamma	June 6, 1932	University of Northern Colorado	Greely, Colorado	Inactive	
Delta Delta	March 18, 1933 – 2006; April 22, 2012 – 2014	Georgetown College	Georgetown, Kentucky	Inactive	
Delta Epsilon	May 3, 1936	Wisconsin College of Music	Milwaukee, Wisconsin	Inactive	
Delta Zeta	June 4, 1940 – 1944	University of Southern California	Los Angeles, California	Inactive	
Delta Eta	December 13, 1941 – 19xx ?; April 12, 2008 – 2015	University of Wisconsin	Milwaukee, Wisconsin	Inactive	
Delta Theta	February 13, 1943 – 2014	Wayne State University	Detroit, Michigan	Inactive	
**Delta Iota**	March 11, 1944	Central Michigan University	Mount Pleasant, Michigan	Active	
**Delta Kappa**	May 22, 1945 – 19xx ?; May 1, 2005	Marshall University	Huntington, West Virginia	Active	
Delta Lambda	November 2, 1947	University of Pennsylvania	Philadelphia, Pennsylvania	Inactive	
Delta Mu	March 12, 1948	University of South Carolina	Columbia, South Carolina	Inactive	
**Delta Nu**	April 24, 1948	Southwestern University	Georgetown, Texas	Active	
Delta Omicron	May 22, 1949	Michigan State University	East Lansing, Michigan	Inactive	
Delta Xi	June 10, 1950	New England Conservatory	Boston, Massachusetts	Inactive	
Delta Pi	May 24, 1951	Hunter College of the City University of New York	New York City, New York	Inactive	
Delta Rho	September 21, 1952	Adelphi University	Garden City, New York	Inactive	
**Delta Sigma**	March 7, 1953	Indiana University of Pennsylvania	Indiana, Pennsylvania	Active	
Delta Tau	February 6, 1954 – 2017	College of William & Mary	Williamsburg, Virginia	Inactive	(Note: In 2017, the Delta Tau chapter disaffiliated with the national organization and formed the fraternity Delta Tau Omicron.)
Delta Upsilon	March 14, 1954	Kent State University	Kent, Ohio	Inactive	
Delta Phi	May 16, 1954 – 1993	Auburn University	Auburn, Alabama	Inactive	
**Delta Chi**	November 13, 1954	University of Nebraska at Kearney	Kearney, Nebraska	Active	
Delta Psi	March 29, 1955	Judson College	Marion, Alabama	Inactive	
**Delta Omega**	March 31, 1955 – 1993; 2017	Jacksonville State University	Jacksonville, Alabama	Active	
**Omicron Alpha**	December 13, 1955	Otterbein University	Westerville, Ohio	Active	
Omicron Beta	April 6, 1956	Lamar University	Beaumont, Texas	Inactive	
**Omicron Gamma**	May 5, 1956	Samford University	Birmingham, Alabama	Active	
Omicron Delta	November 4, 1956 – 19xx ? April 12, 2003	Southeastern Louisiana University	Hammond, Louisiana	Inactive	
Omicron Epsilon	December 2, 1956 – 2012	Northeast Louisiana University	Monroe, Louisiana	Inactive	
Omicron Zeta	May 14, 1957	East Tennessee State University	Johnson City, Tennessee	Inactive	
Omicron Eta	November 16, 1957	Western Maryland College	Westminster, Maryland	Inactive	
Omicron Theta	November 23, 1957 – 19xx ?; April 25, 2003 – 2011	Columbia College	Columbia, South Carolina	Inactive	
Kappa Alpha	June 7, 1958	Ewha Womans University	Seoul, Korea	Inactive	(Note: This was an international chapter that included both collegiate and alumni members.)
Kappa Beta	July 7, 1958	Sookmyung Women's University	Seoul, Korea	Inactive	
Kappa Gamma	November 1, 1958	Seoul National University	Seoul, Korea	Inactive	
Omicron Iota	November 21, 1958	Mercer University	Macon, Georgia	Inactive	
Omicron Kappa	December 13, 1958	Mississippi College	Clinton, Mississippi	Inactive	
Omicron Lambda	May 13, 1959	Queens College	Charlotte, North Carolina	Inactive	
Omicron Mu	December 12, 1959	Louisiana College	Pineville, Louisiana	Inactive	
Omicron Nu	May 1, 1960 – 1987	Iowa Wesleyan College	Mount Pleasant, Iowa	Inactive	
Omicron Xi	October 22, 1961	University of Nebraska Omaha	Omaha, Nebraska	Inactive	
**Omicron Omicron**	December 9, 1961	Western Kentucky University	Bowling Green, Kentucky	Active	
Omicron Pi	March 28, 1963	Queens College, City University of New York	Flushing, Queens, New York City, New York	Inactive	
Omicron Rho	April 17, 1963	Philadelphia Musical Academy	Philadelphia, Pennsylvania	Inactive	
Omicron Tau	May 17, 1964 – 1966	Trenton State College	Trenton, New Jersey	Inactive	
**Omicron Sigma**	October 24, 1964	William Carey University	Hattiesburg, Mississippi	Active	
Omicron Upsilon	March 7, 1965	Glassboro State College	Glassboro, New Jersey	Inactive	
**Omicron Phi**	March 13, 1965	University of Wisconsin–Whitewater	Whitewater, Wisconsin	Active	
Omicron Chi	March 14, 1965 – 1999	University of Wisconsin–Oshkosh	Oshkosh, Wisconsin	Inactive	
Omicron Psi	March 26, 1965	Middle Tennessee State University	Murfreesboro, Tennessee	Inactive	
Omicron Omega	April 3, 1965	Illinois State University	Normal, Illinois	Inactive	
Alpha Alpha	December 12, 1965	University of Wisconsin	Stevens Point, Wisconsin	Inactive	
Alpha Beta	January 16, 1966	Indiana University	Bloomington, Indiana	Inactive	
**Alpha Gamma**	February 26, 1966	Carson-Newman College	Jefferson City, Tennessee	Active	
Alpha Delta	May 15, 1966 – 1998	Howard Payne University	Brownwood, Texas	Inactive	
**Alpha Epsilon**	October 16, 1966	Converse University	Spartanburg, South Carolina	Active	
Alpha Zeta	December 1, 1966 – 2005	Maryville College	Maryville, Tennessee	Inactive	
Alpha Eta	February 9, 1967	Eastern Kentucky University	Richmond, Kentucky	Inactive	
Alpha Theta	February 26, 1967	Frostburg State University	Frostburg, Maryland	Inactive	
Alpha Iota	February 10, 1967 – 1985	Kentucky Wesleyan College	Owensboro, Kentucky	Inactive	
Alpha Kappa	February 19, 1967 – 1993	Texas A&M University–Kingsville	Kingsville, Texas	Inactive	
Alpha Lambda	February 24, 1967 – 1987	Henderson State University	Arkadelphia, Arkansas	Inactive	
Alpha Mu	April 2, 1967 – 1973	Livingston University	Livingston, Alabama	Inactive	
Alpha Nu	April 22, 1967	Bethel College	McKenzie, Tennessee	Inactive	
Alpha Xi	May 21, 1967	Virginia Commonwealth University	Richmond, Virginia	Inactive	
Alpha Omicron	October 15, 1967 – 1992	McMurry University	Abilene, Texas	Inactive	
Alpha Pi	November 4, 1967	University of Wyoming	Laramie, Wyoming	Inactive	
Alpha Rho	December 3, 1967	University of Southern Colorado	Pueblo, Colorado	Inactive	
Alpha Sigma	March 23, 1967	Findlay College	Findlay, Ohio	Inactive	
Kappa Delta	February 14, 1969	Yonsei University	Seoul, Korea	Inactive	
Alpha Tau	April 26, 1970 – 2000	Mars Hill College	Mars Hill, North Carolina	Inactive	
Alpha Upsilon	February 20, 1971	University of the Incarnate Word	San Antonio, Texas	Inactive	
Alpha Phi	February 17, 1971 – 2023	Florida Southern College	Lakeland, Florida	Inactive	
Alpha Chi	November 11, 1972 – 2013	Hope College	Holland, Michigan	Inactive	
**Alpha Psi**	November 18, 1972	Newberry College	Newberry, South Carolina	Active	
Gamma Alpha	February 11, 1973	Rosary Hill College	Buffalo, New York	Inactive	
**Gamma Beta**	February 18, 1973 – 2003	Morris Brown College	Atlanta, Georgia	Active	
Gamma Gamma	December 7, 1973 – 2002	Alverno College	Milwaukee, Wisconsin	Inactive	
Kappa Epsilon	May 1, 1974	Hansung Women's College	Pusan, Korea	Inactive	
Kappa Zeta	May 15, 1974	Chung-Ang University	Seoul, Korea	Inactive	
Kappa Eta	May 1, 1974 – 197x ?; May 20, 1980	Pusan National University	Pusan, Korea	Inactive	
Gamma Delta	March 2, 1975	University of Tennessee	Chattanooga, Tennessee	Inactive	
Gamma Epsilon	September 26, 1976	Oakland University	Rochester, Michigan	Inactive	
**Gamma Zeta**	May 21, 1976 – 1995	Alabama State University	Montgomery, Alabama	Active	
Gamma Eta	April 15, 1978 – 1987	Winston-Salem State University	Winston-Salem, North Carolina	Inactive	
Gamma Theta	May 27, 1978	Knoxville College	Knoxville, Tennessee	Inactive	
Gamma Iota	March 25, 1983 – 19xx ?; April 29, 2003 – 2010	Molloy College	Rockville Centre, New York	Inactive	
**Gamma Kappa**	March 31, 1985	Winthrop University	Rock Hill, South Carolina	Active	
Gamma Lambda	April 28, 1985 – 2002	Saint Mary's College	Winona, Minnesota	Inactive	
**Gamma Mu**	December 3, 1989	Virginia Tech	Blacksburg, Virginia	Active	
Gamma Nu	April 27, 1991 – 1994	Kentucky State University	Frankfort, Kentucky	Inactive	
Gamma Omicron	April 24, 1994	Presbyterian College	Clinton, South Carolina	Inactive	
Gamma Xi	April 23, 1994 – 19xx ?/ May 1, 2004 – 2011	Coastal Carolina University	Conway, South Carolina	Inactive	
Gamma Pi	April 1, 1995	Moravian University	Bethlehem, Pennsylvania	Inactive	
Gamma Rho	October 24, 1996 – 2002	University of Wisconsin–La Crosse	LaCrosse, Wisconsin	Inactive	
Gamma Sigma	November 2, 1996 – 2006	Pennsylvania State University	University Park, Pennsylvania	Inactive	
Gamma Tau	October 25, 1997 – 2000	Chapman University	Orange, California	Inactive	
Gamma Upsilon	December 2, 1997 – xxxx ?; January 21, 2010 – 2014	University of West Florida	Pensacola, Florida	Inactive	
Gamma Phi	March 25, 1998 – 1999	LaGrange College	LaGrange, Georgia	Inactive	
**Gamma Chi**	February 24, 1999 – xxxx ?; 2009	Ohio Northern University	Ada, Ohio	Inactive	
Gamma Psi	March 5, 1999 – 2008	Centre College	Danville, Kentucky	Inactive	
Gamma Omega	October 28, 1999	Santa Clara University	Santa Clara, California	Inactive	
Epsilon Alpha	March 19, 2000 – 2004	Transylvania University	Lexington, Kentucky	Inactive	
Epsilon Beta	May 8, 2000 – October 2006	Eureka College	Eureka, Illinois	Inactive	
Epsilon Gamma	May 1, 2000 – 2002	Huntingdon College	Montgomery, Alabama	Inactive	
Epsilon Epsilon	April 5, 2003 – 2012	Campbellsville University	Campbellsville, Kentucky	Inactive	
Epsilon Delta	May 1, 2005 – 2011	Georgia State University	Atlanta, Georgia	Inactive	
Epsilon Zeta	April 1, 2006 – 2015	Washington & Jefferson College	Washington, Pennsylvania	Inactive	
Epsilon Eta	April 21, 2007 – 2011	Talladega College	Talladega, Alabama	Inactive	
Epsilon Theta	April 30, 2011 – 2012; 2013	Mount St. Joseph University	Cincinnati, Ohio	Inactive	
**Epsilon Iota**	May 7, 2011	Austin College	Sherman, Texas	Active	

== Alumni chapters ==
In the following list, active chapters are indicated in bold and inactive chapters are in italics.

Chapter	Charter date and range	Location	Status	Ref.
**Zeta Alpha**	1925	Detroit, Michigan	Active	
Zeta Beta	December 14, 1926	Columbus, Ohio	Inactive	
**Zeta Gamma**	December 14, 1926	Cincinnati, Ohio	Active	
**Zeta Delta**	February 7, 1927	Milwaukee, Wisconsin	Active	
Zeta Epsilon	May 21, 1928	Chicago, Illinois	Inactive	
**Zeta Zeta**	November 23, 1940	Denver, Colorado	Active	
**Zeta Eta**	December 13, 1941	Bloomington and Normal, Illinois	Active	
Zeta Theta	1943	Los Angeles, California	Inactive	
**Zeta Iota**	1944	Louisville, Kentucky	Active	
Zeta Kappa	May 16, 1946	Cincinnati, Ohio	Inactive	
Zeta Lambda	1946	Baton Rouge, Louisiana	Inactive	
Zeta Mu	February 22, 1947	Lincoln, Nebraska	Inactive	
Zeta Nu	December 1948	Ann Arbor, Michigan	Inactive	
Zeta Xi	July 7, 1953 – 1974	Oakland County, Michigan	Inactive	
**Zeta Omicron**	May 27, 1956	Akron and Kent, Ohio	Active	
Zeta Pi	December 7, 1958 – 1972	Columbia, South Carolina	Inactive	
Zeta Rho	March 7, 1959 – 1974	Kearney, Nebraska	Inactive	
**Zeta Sigma**	May 15, 1960	Cleveland, Ohio	Active	
Zeta Tau	December 10, 1960	St. Petersburg, Florida	Inactive	
Zeta Upsilon	December 10, 1960	Washington, D.C.	Inactive	
Zeta Phi	March 25, 1962	Beaumont, Texas	Inactive	
**Zeta Chi**	February 14, 1967	Dayton, Ohio	Active	
Zeta Psi	June 4, 1967 – 1980	Philadelphia, Pennsylvania	Inactive	
Zeta Omega	April 12, 1969 – 1977	Spartanburg and Greenville, South Carolina	Inactive	
Eta Alpha	May 25, 1969	Pueblo, Colorado	Inactive	
Eta Beta	November 14, 1969	Brownwood, Texas	Inactive	
Eta Gamma	March 7, 1970 – 1997	Fort Collins, Colorado	Inactive	
Eta Delta	February 20, 1971 – 1981	San Antonio, Texas	Inactive	
Eta Epsilon	February 23, 1971 – 1987	Atlanta, Georgia	Inactive	
Eta Zeta	May 2, 1971 – 1984	Buffalo, New York	Inactive	
Eta Eta	May 13, 1972 – 1972	Jacksonville, Alabama	Inactive	
Zeta Kappa Beta	May 17, 1974	Seoul, Korea	Inactive	
Eta Theta	November 9, 1975 – 1987	Dallas, Texas	Inactive	
Eta Iota	September 24, 1978 – 1980	Huntsville, Alabama	Inactive	
Eta Kappa	January 26, 1980 – 1995	Phoenix, Arizona	Inactive	
Eta Lambda	May 18, 2003	Lithonia, Georgia	Active	
Eta Mu	July 18, 2004 or 2005 – 2011	Atlanta, Georgia	Inactive	

== Alumni clubs ==
In the following list, active chapters are indicated in bold and inactive chapters are in italics.

Chapter	Charter date and range	Location	Status	Ref.
Newark-Granville Alumnae Club	1919	Newark and Granville, Ohio	Inactive	
Columbus Alumnae Club	1920 – December 14, 1926	Columbus, Ohio	Inactive	(Note: Chapter withdrew and became Zeta Beta.)
Denver Alumnae Club	1937	Denver, Colorado	Inactive	
Louisville Alumnae Club	December 13, 1942	Louisville, Kentucky	Inactive	
Milwaukee Alumnae Club	1943	Milwaukee, Wisconsin	Inactive	
Houston Alumnae Club	1944	Houston, Texas	Inactive	
Baton Rouge Alumnae Club	November 15, 1945	Baton Rouge, Louisiana	Inactive	
Rochester Alumnae Club	1946–1964	Rochester, New York	Inactive	
Oakland County Alumnae Club	1947	Oakland County, Michigan	Inactive	
Lansing Alumnae Club	December 13, 1942	Lansing, Michigan	Inactive	
Akron Alumnae Club	1948	Akron, Ohio	Inactive	
Ann Arbor Alumnae Club	May 14, 1948	Ann Arbor, Michigan	Inactive	
Toledo Alumnae Club	August 1948	Toledo, Ohio	Inactive	
Des Moines Alumnae Club	1948–1964	Des Moines, Iowa	Inactive	
Decatur Alumnae Club	1949–1964	Decatur, Illinois	Inactive	
Ft. Collins Alumnae Club	1949	Fort Collins, Colorado	Inactive	
Boston Alumnae Club	1954	Boston, Massachusetts	Inactive	
Alexandria Alumnae Club	1955	Alexandria, Louisiana	Inactive	
Columbia Alumnae Club	1955	Columbia, South Carolina	Inactive	
New Orleans Alumnae Club	1955	New Orleans, Louisiana	Inactive	
Georgetown Alumnae Club	1956	Georgetown, Texas	Inactive	
Monroe-Toledo Alumnae Club	1956	Monroe, Michigan and Toledo, Ohio	Inactive	
Shreveport Alumni Club	1956	Shreveport, Louisiana	Inactive	
Baltimore Alumnae Club	March 1, 1957	Baltimore, Maryland	Inactive	
Colorado Springs Alumnae Club	1957	Colorado Springs, Colorado	Inactive	
Norfolk Alumni Club	1957	Norfolk, Virginia	Inactive	
San Diego Alumnae Club	1958	San Diego, California	Inactive	
Huntington Alumnae Club	1959	Huntington, West Virginia	Inactive	
Beaumont Alumnae Club	1961	Beaumont, Texas	Inactive	
Bluegrass Alumnae Club	1963	Lexington, Kentucky	Inactive	
Atlanta Alumnae Club	1964–2012	Atlanta, Georgia	Inactive	
Canton Alumnae Club	1964	Canton, Ohio	Inactive	
New York Alumnae Club	1964–1969	New York City, Scarsdale, and New Rochelle, New York	Inactive	
Dayton Alumnae Club	1966	Dayton, Ohio	Inactive	
Tuscaloosa Alumnae Club	1966	Tuscaloosa, Alabama	Inactive	
Piedmont Area Alumnae Club	1966	Spartanburg, South Carolina	Inactive	
Brownwood Alumnae Club	1967	Brownwood, Texas	Inactive	
Mobile Alumnae Club	1967	Mobile, Alabama	Inactive	
**Lakeland Alumnae Club**	1982–1983	Lakeland, Florida	Active	
Middle Tennessee Alumni Club	2013–2014	Murfreesboro, Tennessee	Inactive	
**Florida Alumni Club**	July 21, 2016	Florida	Active	
Birmingham Alumnae Club	19xx ?–1986	Birmingham, Alabama	Inactive	
Bloomington Alumnae Club		Bloomington, Illinois	Inactive	
Champaign-Urbana Alumni Club	xxxx ?–2014	Champaign and Urbana, Illinois	Inactive	
Chicago Alumnae Club		Chicago, Illinois	Inactive	
Cincinnati Alumnae Club	xxxx ?–2009	Cincinnati, Ohio	Inactive	
Cleveland Alumnae Club		Cleveland, Ohio	Inactive	
Detroit Alumnae Club		Detroit, Michigan	Inactive	
Georgia Alumni Club	xxxx ?–2012	Decatur, Georgia	Inactive	
Greeley Alumnae Club		Greeley, Colorado	Inactive	
Indianapolis Alumnae Club	19xx ?–1980	Indianapolis, Indiana	Inactive	
Kansas City Alumnae Club		Kansas City, Kansas	Inactive	
Kappa Alpha Alumnae Club		Seoul, Korea	Inactive	
Kappa Beta Alumnae Club		Seoul, Korea	Inactive	
**Kearney Alumni Club**		Kearney, Nebraska	Active	
Knoxville Alumni Club		Knoxville, Tennessee	Inactive	
**Lincoln Alumni Club**		Lincoln, Nebraska	Active	
Long Island Alumnae Club		Long Island, New York	Inactive	
Los Angeles Alumnae Club		Los Angeles, California	Inactive	
**Maryland Alumni Club**		Frostburg, Maryland	Active	
Middletown Alumnae Club		Middletown, Ohio	Inactive	
Omaha Alumnae Club		Omaha, Nebraska	Inactive	
Philadelphia Alumnae Club		Philadelphia, Pennsylvania	Inactive	
Richmond Alumnae Club		Richmond, Virginia	Inactive	
Twin Cities Alumnae Club		Minneapolis and Saint Paul, Minnesota	Inactive	
Washington Alumnae Club		Georgetown, Virginia	Inactive	
