= List of 1796 United States presidential electors =

This is an incomplete list of presidential electors in the United States presidential election of 1796.

== Electoral college selection ==
The Constitution, in Article II, Section 1, provided that the state legislatures should decide the manner in which their Electors were chosen. Different state legislatures chose different methods:

Method of choosing electors	State(s)
Each Elector appointed by the state legislature	Connecticut; Delaware; New Jersey; New York; Rhode Island; South Carolina; Vermont
State is divided into electoral districts, with one Elector chosen per district by the voters of that district	Kentucky; Maryland; North Carolina; Virginia
Each Elector chosen by voters statewide	Georgia; Pennsylvania
Two Electors appointed by the state legislature; Each remaining Elector chosen by the state legislature from list of top two vote-getters in each Congressional district	Massachusetts
Each Elector chosen by voters statewide; however, if no candidate wins majority, the state legislature appoints Elector from top two candidates	New Hampshire
State is divided into electoral districts, with one Elector chosen per district; Each county chooses an electoral delegate by popular vote; Elector is chosen by electoral delegates of the counties within their district	Tennessee

== Delaware ==
- Richard Bassett
- Isaac Cooper
- Thomas Robinson

== Georgia ==
- James Jackson
- Edward Telfair
- Charles Abercrombie
- William Barnett

== Kentucky ==
- Stephen Ormsby
- Isaac Shelby
- Caleb Wallace
- John Coburn

== Maryland ==
- John Rousby Plater Federalist
- Francis Deakins Federalist
- George Murdock Federalist
- John Lynn Federalist
- Gabriel Duvall Democratic-Republican
- John Archer Democratic-Republican
- John Gilpin Democratic-Republican
- John Roberts Federalist
- John Eccleston Federalist
- John Done Federalist

== New Hampshire ==
- Oliver Peabody
- John Taylor Gilman
- Benjamin Bellows
- Timothy Farrar
- Ebenezer Thompson

== Rhode Island ==
- Samuel J. Potter

== South Carolina ==
- Edward Rutledge
- John Mathews
- Andrew Pickens
- Arthur Simkins
- Thomas Taylor
- John Chestnut
- John Rutledge, Jr.
- William Thomas

== Tennessee ==
- Hugh Wilson
- Joseph Greer
- Daniel Smith

== Vermont ==
- Elijah Dewey
- Elisha Sheldon
- John Bridgman
- Oliver Gallup

== Virginia ==
- William Nimmo Democratic-Republican
- Benjamin Temple Federalist Essex County, Gloucester County, King and Queen County, King William County, Mathews County, Middlesex County.
- George Markham Democratic-Republican
- Peter Johnson Democratic-Republican
- William Terry Democratic-Republican

== See also ==
- 1796 United States presidential election
