= Ledyard =

Ledyard may refer to:

- Ledyard (name)
- Ledyard, Connecticut, United States
- Ledyard, Iowa, United States
- Ledyard, New York, United States
- Ledyard Bridge, connecting New Hampshire and Vermont, United States
