= 1788 United States House of Representatives elections in South Carolina =

United States House of Representatives elections in South Carolina, 1788
- November 24–25, 1788

All 5 South Carolina seats to the United States House of Representatives
	Majority party	Minority party
Party	Anti-Administration	Pro-Administration
Seats won	3	2
Popular vote	2,069	1,343
Percentage	57.8%	37.5%

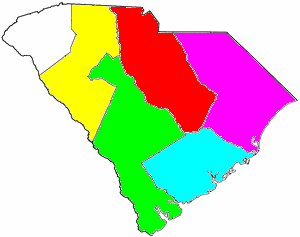
South Carolina congressional districts, 1788 to 1790 1st District, Charleston 2nd District, Beaufort-Orangeburg 3rd District, Georgetown-Cheraw 4th District, Camden 5th District, Ninety-Six

The 1788 United States House of Representatives elections in South Carolina were held on November 24 and 25, 1788 to select five Representatives for two-year terms from the state of South Carolina. The elections resulted in two candidates in support of Washington's administration and three candidates opposed to his policies.

== 1st congressional district ==
William L. Smith defeated two candidates in the first election of the 1st congressional district, known as the Charleston District.

Candidate	Position	Votes	Percent
William L. Smith	Pro-Administration	653	53.09%
Alexander Gillon	Anti-Administration	381	31.38%
David Ramsay	Pro-Administration	191	15.53%

== 2nd congressional district ==
Aedanus Burke defeated Robert Barnwell in the first election of the 2nd congressional district, known as the Beaufort-Orangeburg District.

Candidate	Position	Votes	Percent
Aedanus Burke	Anti-Administration	422	99.29%
Robert Barnwell	Pro-Administration	1	0.24%
John Bull		1	0.24%
John Kean		1	0.24%

== 3rd congressional district ==
Daniel Huger won the first election of the 3rd congressional district, known as the Georgetown-Cheraw District.

Candidate	Position	Votes	Percent
Daniel Huger	Pro-Administration	496	75.04%
John Page		165	24.96%

== 4th congressional district ==
Thomas Sumter won the first election of the 4th congressional district, known as the Camden District.

Candidate	Position	Votes	Percent
Thomas Sumter	Anti-Administration	507	100%

== 5th congressional district ==
Thomas Tudor Tucker won the first election of the 5th congressional district, known as the Ninety-Six District.

Candidate	Position	Votes	Percent
Thomas Tudor Tucker	Anti-Administration	759	100%

== See also ==
- United States House of Representatives elections, 1789
- South Carolina's congressional districts
