= John Done =

American judge (c. 1747–1831)

John Done (c. 1747 – October 9, 1831) was a justice of the Maryland Court of Appeals from 1812 to 1814.

Born in Somerset County, Maryland to John Done (d. 1772) and Sarah Waters Done (d. 1781), Done was admitted to the practice of law before the Somerset County court and the Worcester County court 1769. He served as sheriff of Worcester County from 1773 to 1775. During the American Revolutionary War he was commissioned as a colonel in the Princess Anne Battalion in 1781, and in 1788 served on the Constitution Ratification Convention for Worcester County. When the town of Princess Anne, Maryland was platted, Done bought one of the allotted properties and built a large house there some time before the Revolutionary War. Later, a local named Zadok Long rented the property from Done and conducted it as a tavern, eventually buying the property on June 17, 1797, and converting it into the Washington Hotel, a local landmark frequented by famous residents of the state.

Done was an unsuccessful candidate for the United States Congress in the 1789 United States House of Representatives elections in Maryland, garnering about 24% of the vote in a loss to George Gale. In 1796, he was a presidential elector for John Adams. Done held various judicial offices between 1791 and 1814, culminating in his appointment to the Maryland Court of Appeals on December 14, 1812, to a seat vacated by the death of Judge William Polk. He served until his resignation in 1814.

Done was married twice, first to Sarah Rigley, and then to Patience Bayly. Between them, he had eighteen children. He died at Annapolis, Maryland.

Political offices
Preceded by William Polk	Judge of the Maryland Court of Appeals; 1812–1814	Succeeded by William Bond Martin
