= Reveries of a Bachelor =

Reveries of a Bachelor or A Book of the Heart is a book by American author Donald Grant Mitchell, published in 1850 under the pseudonym Ik Marvel. In the text, the author theorizes on boyhood, country life style, marriage, travel, and dreaming.

A reverie is an irregular train of thought or abstract musing, and Mitchell writes on four different themes:

- Smoke, Flame, and Ashes
- Sea Cole and Anthracite
- A Cigar three times Lighted
- Morning, Noon and Evening.

The first two reveries were originally published in 1849 in the magazine Southern Literary Messenger and in 1850 the four essays were published in book format to great public acclaim.

It was one of poet Emily Dickinson's favorite books.
