= Ledyard (name) =

Ledyard is both a surname and a given name. Notable people with the name include:

Surname:

- Gari Ledyard (1932–2021), Sejong Professor of Korean History
- Grant Ledyard (born 1961), National Hockey League defenseman
- Hal Ledyard (1931–1973), gridiron football player
- Henry Ledyard (1812–1880), American politician
- Isaac Ledyard (1755–1803), American physician
- Lewis Cass Ledyard (1851–1932), American lawyer
- John Ledyard (1751–1789), American explorer and adventurer
- William Ledyard (1738–1781), colonel in the Continental Army during the American Revolutionary War

Middle name:

- Seth Ledyard Phelps (1824-1885), United States Navy officer, diplomat, and politician

Given name:

- C. Ledyard Blair (1867–1949), American investment banker and yachtsman
- Ledyard Bill (1836–1907), American politician, publisher, and writer
- Ledyard Blair Clark (1917–2000), American liberal journalist and political activist, grandson of C. Ledyard Blair
- Ledyard Mitchell (1881–1964), American automobile executive and American football player
- G. Ledyard Stebbins (1906–2000), American botanist and geneticist
- Ledyard Tucker (1910–2004), American mathematician
