= 1789 United States House of Representatives elections in Maryland =

- December 15, 1788, to January 10, 1789

All 6 Maryland seats to the United States House of Representatives
| | Majority party | Minority party |
|---|---|---|
| Party | Anti-Administration party | Pro-Administration party |
| Last election | 0 | 0 |
| Seats won | 4 | 2 |
| Seat change | ▲ | ▲ |
| Popular vote | 27,457 | 19,194 |
| Percentage | 58.85% | 41.15% |
| Swing | ▲58.85% | ▲41.15% |

The 1789 United States House of Representatives elections in Maryland were held from December 15, 1788, to January 10, 1789, to elect the six U.S. representatives from the state of Maryland, one from each of the state's six congressional districts. The elections coincided with the 1788–89 U.S. presidential election , as well as other elections to the House of Representatives, elections to the United States Senate and various state and local elections.

Maryland had a mixed district/at-large system similar to Georgia's. Under Maryland law, "candidates were elected at-large but had to be residents of a specific district with the statewide vote determining winners from each district."

== District 1 ==
=== General election ===
==== Results ====
Maryland's 1st congressional district (new district), 1789
| Party | Candidate | Votes | % |
|---|---|---|---|
| Anti-Administration | Michael Jenifer Stone | 5,154 | 65.36% |
| Pro-Administration | George Dent | 2,731 | 34.64% |
| Total votes | | 7,885 | 100.00 |

== District 2 ==
=== General election ===
==== Results ====
Maryland's 2nd congressional district (new district), 1789
| Party | Candidate | Votes | % |
|---|---|---|---|
| Anti-Administration | Joshua Seney | 7,616 | 100.0 |
| Total votes | | 7,616 | 100.0 |

== District 3 ==
=== General election ===
==== Results ====
Maryland's 3rd congressional district (new district), 1789
| Party | Candidate | Votes | % |
|---|---|---|---|
| Anti-Administration | Benjamin Contee | 5,476 | 70.07 |
| Pro-Administration | John Francis Mercer | 2,339 | 29.93 |
| Total votes | | 7,815 | 100.0 |

== District 4 ==
=== General election ===
==== Results ====
Maryland's 4th congressional district (new district), 1789
| Party | Candidate | Votes | % |
|---|---|---|---|
| Anti-Administration | William Smith | 5,415 | 69.08 |
| Pro-Administration | Samuel Sterett | 2,424 | 30.92 |
| Total votes | | 7,839 | 100.0 |

== District 5 ==
=== General election ===
==== Results ====
Maryland's 5th congressional district (new district), 1789
| Party | Candidate | Votes | % |
|---|---|---|---|
| Pro-Administration | George Gale | 5,456 | 70.7 |
| Anti-Administration | John Done | 1,832 | 23.8 |
| Pro-Administration | William Vans Murray | 425 | 5.5 |
| Total votes | | 7,713 | 100.0 |

== District 6 ==
=== General election ===
==== Results ====
Maryland's 6th congressional district (new district), 1789
| Party | Candidate | Votes | % |
|---|---|---|---|
| Pro-Administration | Daniel Carroll | 5,819 | 74.8 |
| Anti-Administration | Abraham Faw | 1,964 | 25.2 |
| Total votes | | 7,885 | 100.0 |

== See also ==
- 1788–89 United States House of Representatives elections
- 1788–89 United States elections
