= Donald Grant Mitchell =

American novelist

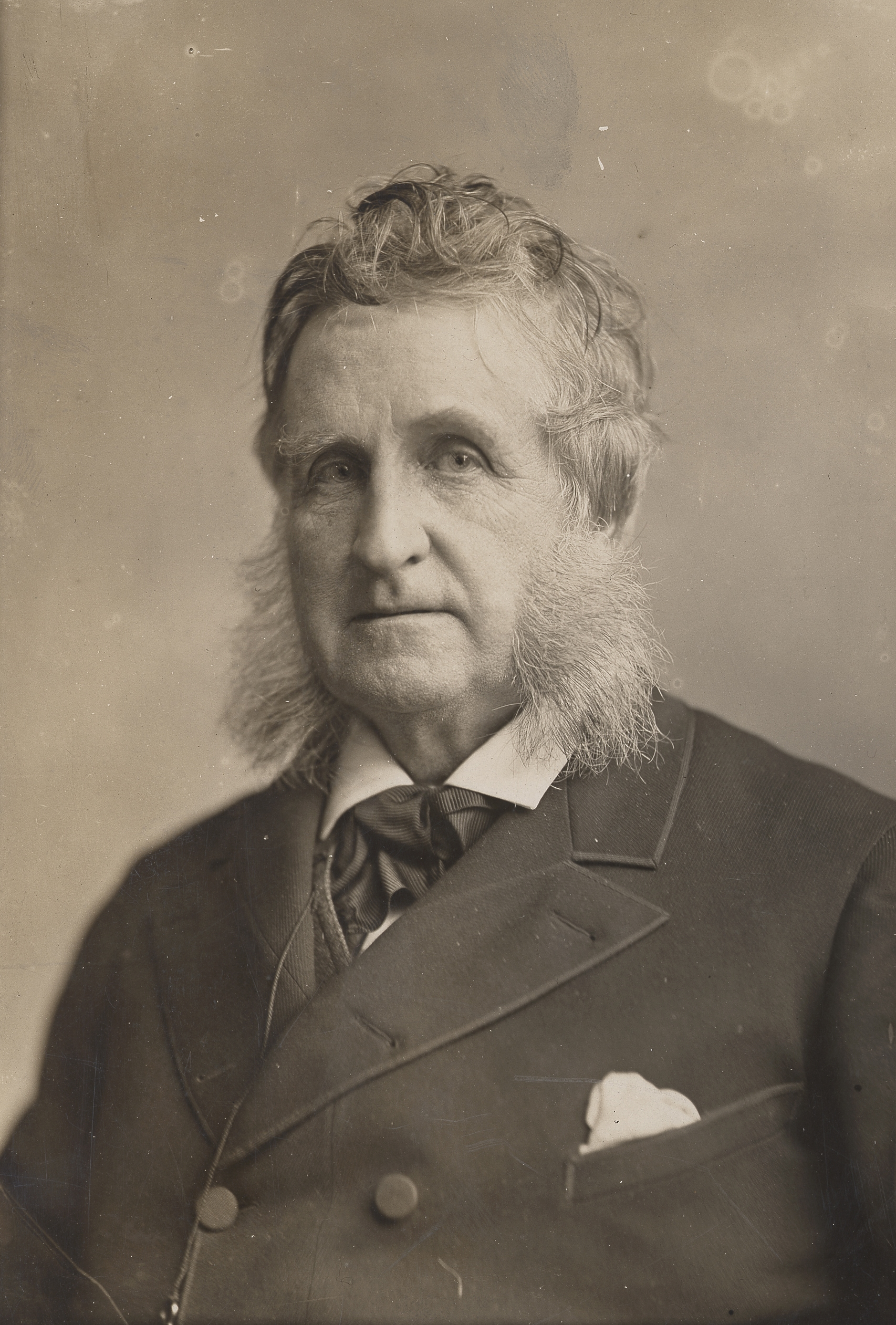
- Donald Grant Mitchell in 1883
- Born: Donald Grant Mitchell; April 12, 1822; Norwich, Connecticut, United States
- Died: December 15, 1908 (aged 86); New Haven, Connecticut
- Occupation: Author
- Writing career
- Pen name: Ik Marvel
- Genres: Fiction, non-fiction, travel literature, essay, literary criticism
- Notable work: Reveries of a Bachelor

Donald Grant Mitchell (April 12, 1822 – December 15, 1908) was an American essayist and novelist who usually wrote under the pen name Ik Marvel.

== Biography ==
Mitchell, the grandson of politician and jurist Stephen Mix Mitchell, was born in Norwich, Connecticut. He graduated from Yale College in 1841, where he was a member of Skull and Bones and studied law, but he soon took up literature. Throughout his life he showed a particular interest in agriculture and landscape gardening, which he followed at first in pursuit of health. He served as U.S. consul at Venice, Italy, from 1853 to 1854, and in 1855 he settled at his estate, called Edgewood, near New Haven, Connecticut.

He was best known as the author, under the pseudonym "Ik Marvel", of the sentimental essays contained in the volumes Reveries of a Bachelor, or a Book of the Heart (first published in book form in 1850) and Dream Life, a Fable of the Seasons (1851). Reveries of a Bachelor examines the dream-like lives Americans were living at the time. It was one of the top best sellers of its time but has received little attention from 19th century literary critics. In the text, Ik Marvel theorizes on boyhood, country life style, marriage, travel, and dreaming. Reveries of a Bachelor was one of poet Emily Dickinson's favorite books.

Dream Life, a Fable of the Seasons, was dedicated to Washington Irving, to whom Mitchell was introduced by Lewis Gaylord Clark. Irving said of the dedication: "Though I have a great disinclination in general to be the object of literary oblations and compliments... I have enjoyed your writings with such peculiar relish and have been so drawn toward the author by the qualities of head and heart evinced in them, that I confess I feel gratified by the dedication". Mitchell produced books of travel and volumes of essays on rural themes including Reveries of a Bachelor (1850), My Farm of Edgewood: A Country Book (1863), sketchy studies of English monarchs and of English and American literature, and a character novel entitled Doctor Johns (1866). His other works include About Old Story-tellers (1878) and American Lands and Letters (1897–99).

Oliver Wendell Holmes Sr., called him "one of the pleasantest of our American writers."

== Bibliography ==
- Fresh Gleanings, or a New Sheaf from the Old Fields of Continental Europe (1847)
- Battle Summer (1850; originally planned as a two volume work, only the first was published.)
- The dignity of learning : a valedictory oration, by Donald G. Mitchell, pronounced before the senior class of Yale College, July 7, 1841; Published by request of the class. (1841)
- Fresh Gleanings, or Or, A New Sheaf From The Old Fields Of Continental Europe (1847)
- The Battle Summer : Being Transcripts from Personal Observations in Paris, During the Year 1848 (1850)
- The Lorgnette, or Studies of the Town, by an Opera-Goer (1850)
- Reveries of a Bachelor (1850)
- Dream Life : a fable of the seasons (1851)
- Fudge Doings : being Tony Fudge's record of the same In forty chapters [2 Volumes] (1855)
- Agricultural address delivered before the Connecticut State Agricultural Society, at Bridgeport (1858)
- Doctor Johns : Being a Narrative of Certain Events in the Life of an Orthodox Minister of Connecticut (1861)
- My Farm of Edgewood : a country book (1863)
- Seven Stories, with Basement and Attic (1864)
- Wet Days at Edgewood, with old farmers, old gardeners, and old pastorals (1865)
- Doctor Johns (1866)
- Rural Studies (1867; reprinted as Out-of-Town Places in 1884)
- Hearth and Home (1868)
- Pictures of Edgewood; in a series of photographs (1869)
- About Old Story Tellers : of how and when they lived, and what stories they told (1877)
- The Woodbridge Record (1883)
- Daniel Tyler : a memorial volume (1883)
- Bound Together (1884)
- English Lands, Letters, and Kings (in Four Volumes) (1889–90)
- American Lands and Letters : Leather-stocking to Poe's "Raven." (1897)
- American Lands and Letters : the Mayflower to Rip-Van-Winkle (1898)
- Looking back at boyhood (1906) {originally published in the periodical "Youth's Companion" in 1892}
- The works of Donald G. Mitchell (1907)

=== Biography ===
- The Life of Donald G. Mitchell, by Waldo Hilary Dunn (1922)

== Notes ==
- Spiro, Lisa (ed.). "Smoke, Flame, and Ashes". Archived from the original on September 5, 2006.
