= 1788 United States House of Representatives election in Pennsylvania =

United States House of Representatives election in Pennsylvania, 1788
- November 26, 1788

All 8 Pennsylvania seats to the United States House of Representatives
	Majority party	Minority party
Party	Pro-Administration	Anti-Administration
Seats won	6	2
Popular vote	8,707	7,417
Percentage	54.0%	46.0%

An election to the United States House of Representatives was held in Pennsylvania on November 26, 1788, for the 1st Congress.

== Background ==
The United States Constitution was adopted on September 17, 1787, by the Constitutional Convention in Philadelphia, and then ratified by the States. Pennsylvania's legislature ratified the Constitution on December 12, 1787, by a vote of 46–23. On July 8, 1788, the Congress of the Confederation passed a resolution calling the first session of the 1st United States Congress for March 4, 1789, to convene at New York City and the election of senators and representatives in the meanwhile by the States.

== Election ==
Pennsylvania's legislature scheduled the election for November 26, 1788, and provided for it to be held on an at-large basis. This was an attempt by the Federalist-dominated legislature to prevent anti-Federalist Representatives from being elected in frontier districts. Both parties submitted tickets with 8 candidates each. The large German population in Pennsylvania tended to vote for German candidates, giving the Anti-Federalist Muhlenberg and Hiester enough votes to gain seats.

1788 United States House election results
Pro-Administration			Anti-Administration		
Frederick Muhlenberg	8,707	7.49%	Peter Muhlenberg	7,417	6.38%
Henry Wynkoop	8,246	7.09%	Daniel Hiester	7,403	6.37%
Thomas Hartley	8,163	7.02%	William Findley	6,586	5.66%
George Clymer	8,094	6.96%	William Irvine	6,492	5.58%
Thomas Fitzsimons	8,086	6.95%	Charles Pettit	6,481	5.57%
Thomas Scott	8,068	6.94%	William Montgomery	6,348	5.46%
John Allison	7,067	6.08%	Blair McClenachan	6,223	5.35%
Stephen Chambers	7,050	6.06%	Robert Whitehall	5,850	5.03%

== See also ==
- United States House of Representatives elections, 1788 and 1789
