= 1791 Connecticut's at-large congressional district special election =

Amasa Learned (Pro-Administration) was elected September 19, 1791 in Connecticut's at-large congressional district to finish the term of Roger Sherman (Pro-Administration). Sherman had been re-elected in 1790, but resigned June 13, 1791 to become U.S. Senator.
