= John Bull (South Carolina politician) =

American statesman and revolutionary

John Bull (c. 1740 – 1802) was an American statesman and revolutionary who served as a delegate from South Carolina in the Continental Congress from 1784 to 1787.
