= 1791 Maryland's 3rd congressional district special election =

A special election was held in Maryland's 3rd congressional district to fill a vacancy caused by the resignation of William Pinkney (P) due to questions of ineligibility due to his residence

== Election results ==
Candidate	Party	Votes	Percent
John Francis Mercer	Anti-Administration	313	100%

== See also ==
- List of special elections to the United States House of Representatives
