= 1791 New York's 1st congressional district special election =

A special election was held in New York's 1st congressional district April 26–28, 1791 to fill a vacancy left by the death of Representative-elect James Townsend (P) on May 24, 1790, before the first meeting of the 2nd Congress

Townsend had defeated incumbent William Floyd (A) and, as he died before the first meeting of the 2nd Congress and the special election was won by Thomas Tredwell (A), there was no change of parties between the 1st and 2nd Congress

== Election results ==
Candidate	Party	Votes	Percent
Thomas Tredwell	Anti-Administration	666	26.2%
John Vanderbilt	Pro-Administration	489	19.2%
Henry Peters	Pro-Administration	369	14.5%
Ezra L'Hommedieu	Anti-Administration	361	14.2%
Stephen Carman	Anti-Administration	360	14.1%
Isaac Ledyard	Pro-Administration	301	11.8%

== See also ==
- List of Special elections to the United States House of Representatives
- United States House of Representatives elections in New York, 1790
