= 1790 Virginia's 9th congressional district special election =

A special election was held in Virginia's 9th congressional district in July, 1790, to fill the vacancy left by the death of Theodorick Bland (A) on June 1, 1790.

== Election results ==
Candidate	Party	Votes	Percent
William B. Giles	Anti-Administration	1,561	54.5%
Thomas Edmunds	Pro-Administration	1,301	45.5%

Giles took his seat December 7, 1790.

== See also ==
- List of special elections to the United States House of Representatives
