= Isaac Ledyard =

American politician and physician

Isaac Ledyard (November 5, 1755 or 1754 – August 28, 1803) was a physician and politician from New York.

== Life ==
He was born in Groton, Connecticut, the son of Youngs Ledyard (1731–1762) and Mary (Avery) Ledyard (1730–1787).

Ledyard was Health Officer for the Port of New York, and he was a candidate in the 1791 New York's 1st congressional district special election. He was a presidential elector in 1800, voting for Thomas Jefferson and Aaron Burr.

The town of Ledyard, Connecticut was named after his family.
