= James Hillhouse =

American lawyer, real estate developer and politician (1754-1832)

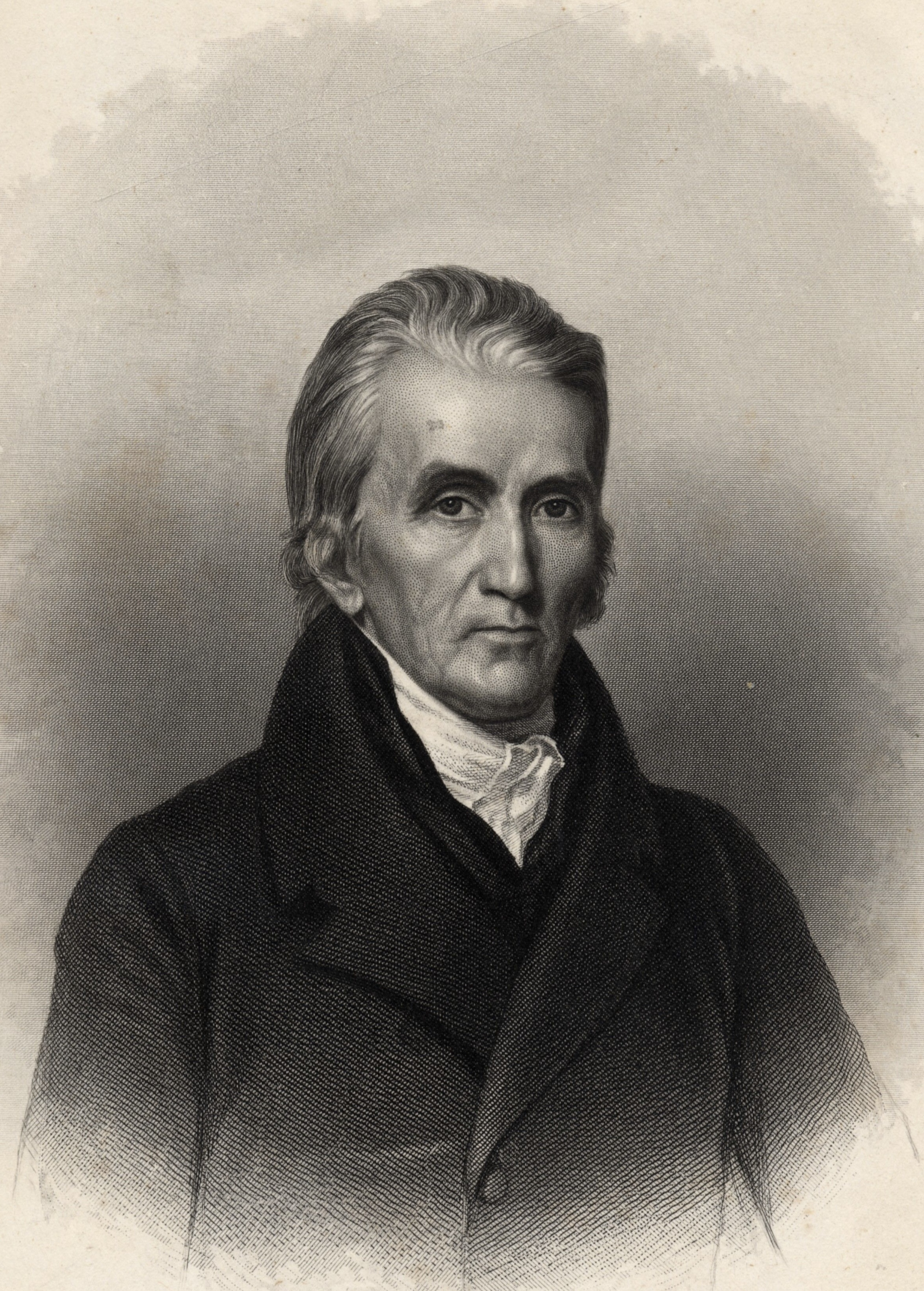

President pro tempore of the United States Senate
- In office February 28, 1801 – March 3, 1801
- Preceded by: John E. Howard
- Succeeded by: Abraham Baldwin

United States Senator from Connecticut
- In office December 6, 1796 – June 10, 1810
- Preceded by: Oliver Ellsworth
- Succeeded by: Samuel W. Dana

Member of the U.S. House of Representatives from Connecticut's at-large district
- In office March 4, 1791 – December 5, 1796
- Preceded by: Benjamin Huntington
- Succeeded by: James Davenport

Member of the Connecticut House of Representatives
- In office 1780–1785

Personal details
- Born: October 20, 1754 Montville, Connecticut Colony, British America
- Died: December 29, 1832 (aged 78) New Haven, Connecticut, U.S.
- Resting place: Grove Street Cemetery, New Haven, Connecticut
- Party: Federalist
- Education: Yale University
- Profession: lawyer, realtor, politician

James Hillhouse (October 20, 1754 – December 29, 1832) was an American lawyer, real estate developer, and politician from New Haven, Connecticut. He represented the state in both chambers of the U.S. Congress. From February to March 1801, Hillhouse briefly served as President pro tempore of the United States Senate.

== Youth and family life ==
Hillhouse was born in Montville in the Connecticut Colony, the son of William Hillhouse and Sarah (Griswold) Hillhouse. He had at least nine siblings, seven of which survived to adulthood. At the age of seven, he was adopted by his childless uncle and aunt, James Abraham and Mary Lucas Hillhouse. He attended the Hopkins Grammar School in New Haven, Connecticut, and graduated from Yale College in 1773. At Yale, he was a member of the Linonian Society. He studied law and was admitted to the bar in 1775, and practiced law in New Haven.

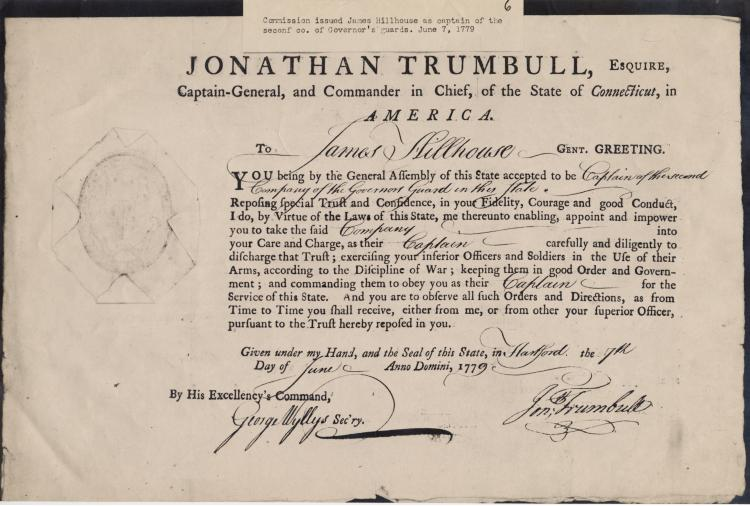
Commission for James Hillhouse in the Governor's Foot Guards, June 1779

=== Family life ===
He married Sarah Lloyd in 1779 and that same year they had their one and only child together, Mary. However, Mary would die aged just three days, and Sarah three days after that. In 1782, he married Rebecca Woolsey. They had five children together: Sarah, Mary, James, Augustus, and Rebecca. All five would survive to adulthood. His wife, Rebecca Woolsey, would die in December, 1813 after 31 years of marriage.

== Revolutionary War ==
During the Revolutionary War, Hillhouse served as captain of the Second Company of the Governor's Foot Guard. During the successful British invasion of New Haven on July 5, 1779, he commanded troops alongside Aaron Burr, with Yale student volunteers.

== Career and death ==
Portrait by James Sharples, c. 1796

Hillhouse was a member of the Connecticut House of Representatives from 1780 to 1785. He was a member of the Connecticut council of Assistants from 1789 to 1790 and was elected as a U.S. representative from Connecticut at large for the Second, Third, and Fourth Congresses and served from March 4, 1791, to his resignation, in the fall of 1796. He also served as a judge of the Connecticut Supreme Court of Errors from 1789 to 1793.

Elected as a US senator on May 12, 1796, to fill the vacancy caused by the resignation of Oliver Ellsworth, Hillhouse was re-elected in 1797, 1803, and 1809, and he served from December 1796 to June 10, 1810, when he resigned. During the Sixth Congress he was President pro tempore of the Senate. During his time in this role, he administered the oath of office to Aaron Burr as Vice President, within the first inauguration of Thomas Jefferson on March 4, 1801.

In 1803, Hillhouse and several other New England politicians proposed secession of New England from the union because of the growing influence of Jeffersonian Democrats, especially after the Louisiana Purchase, which would further diminish Northern and Federalist influence.

Hillhouse was elected a member of the American Antiquarian Society in 1813.

In 1814, he was a Connecticut delegate to the Hartford Convention, and he was treasurer of Yale College from 1782 to 1832.

Hillhouse was a slaveholder.

Hillhouse died in New Haven on December 29, 1832 at the age of 78. He was buried at Grove Street Cemetery located in the same city along with both his wives.

== Legacy ==
Hillhouse made major contributions to the beautification of New Haven. He was active in the drive to plant the elm trees, which gave New Haven the nickname of "Elm City." Hillhouse Avenue and James Hillhouse High School, in New Haven, are named after him.

He was a nephew of Matthew Griswold and an uncle of Thomas Hillhouse.

U.S. House of Representatives
Preceded by Benjamin Huntington	U.S. Representative from Connecticut (at large); March 4, 1791 – December 5, 1796	Succeeded by James Davenport
U.S. Senate
Preceded by Oliver Ellsworth	U.S. senator (Class 1) from Connecticut; 1796–1810; Served alongside: Jonathan Trumbull Jr., Uriah Tracy, Chauncey Goodrich	Succeeded by Samuel W. Dana
Political offices
Preceded by John E. Howard	President pro tempore of the United States Senate; February 28, 1801 – March 3, 1801	Succeeded by Abraham Baldwin
