= William Vans Murray =

American politician (1760–1803)

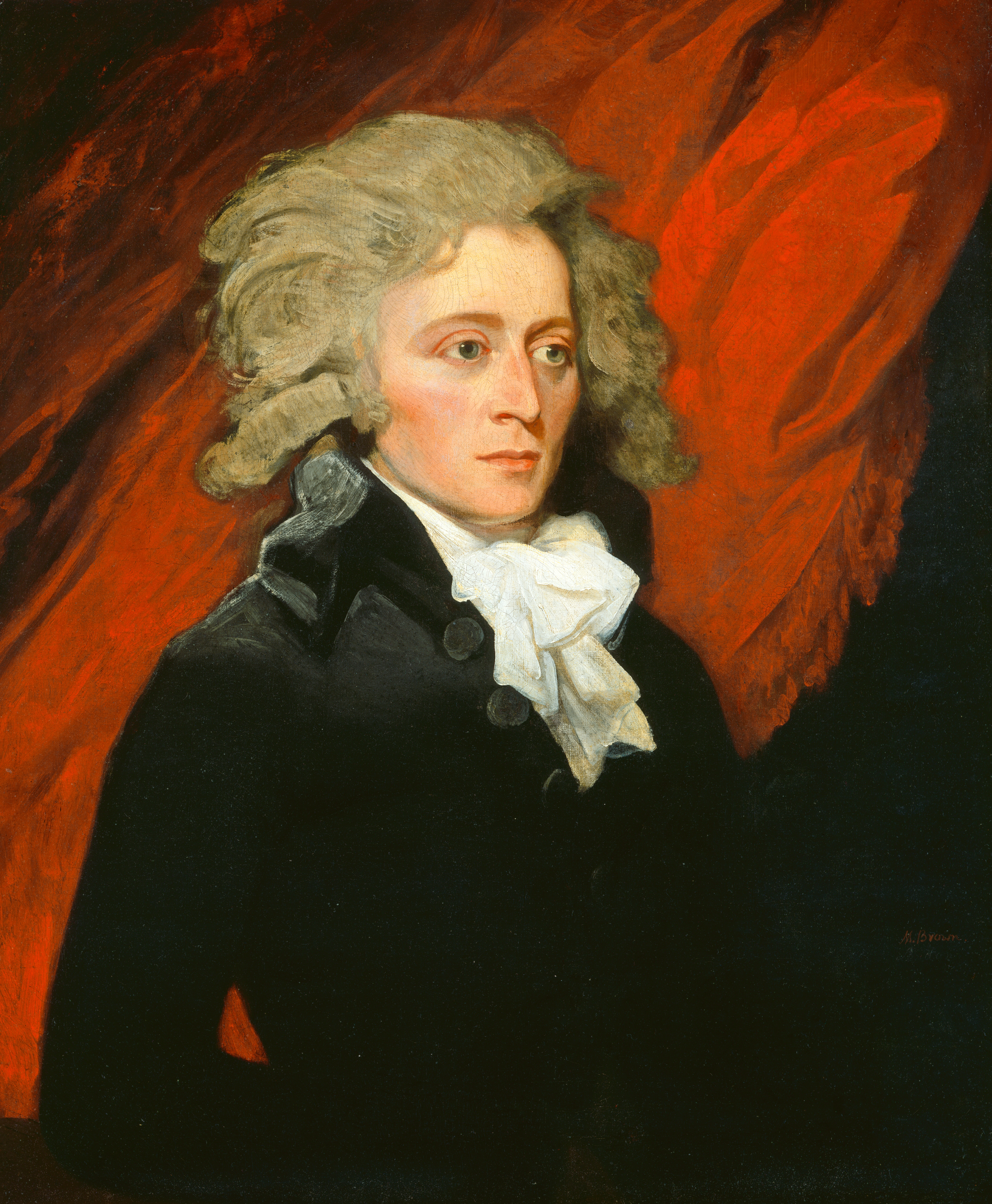
- Portrait (1787), oil on canvas, of William Vans Murray (1760–1803), by Mather Brown (1761–1831)

6th United States Minister to the Netherlands
- In office June 20, 1797 – September 2, 1801
- President: John Adams; Thomas Jefferson
- Preceded by: John Quincy Adams
- Succeeded by: William Eustis

Member of the U.S. House of Representatives from Maryland
- In office March 4, 1791 – March 3, 1797
- Preceded by: George Gale
- Succeeded by: John Dennis
- Constituency: 5th district (1791–93); 8th district (1793–97)

Personal details
- Born: February 9, 1760 Cambridge, Province of Maryland, British America
- Died: December 11, 1803 (aged 43) Dorchester County, Maryland, U.S.
- Party: Pro-Administration
- Relatives: Clement Sulivane (nephew)
- Occupation: Lawyer, attorney, diplomat

William Vans Murray (February 9, 1760 – December 11, 1803) was an American lawyer, politician, and statesman. He served in the Maryland House of Delegates from 1788 to 1790, and in the United States House of Representatives from 1791 to 1797. He was the United States Ambassador to the Netherlands from 1797 to 1801.

== Biography ==
=== Early life ===
William Vans Murray was born on February 9, 1760, in Cambridge in the Province of Maryland. He studied the law in England.

=== Career ===
He served in the Maryland House of Delegates from 1788 to 1790. He was then elected to the U.S. House of Representatives from the fifth district of Maryland, serving from 1791 until 1793; he previously ran for the seat in 1789. He represented the eighth district from 1793 to 1797. He was appointed the U.S. Minister (ambassador) to the Netherlands from 1797 until 1801. He supported the U.S. mission to France in peace negotiations.

He wrote a series of six essays, which were published in Philadelphia during the Constitutional Convention. Murray rejected the notion, advanced by Montesquieu among others, that virtue was the root of democracy. He addressed his essays to John Adams, then assigned to London as the United States ambassador, and of whom Murray was a "political disciple."

In 1799, Murray was nominated as a U.S. minister to France. He played a major role in securing peace and the end of the Quasi-War with the Convention of 1800.

U.S. House of Representatives
Preceded by George Gale	Member of the U.S. House of Representatives from Maryland's 5th congressional district 1791–1793	Succeeded by Samuel Smith
Preceded by District created	Member of the U.S. House of Representatives from Maryland's 8th congressional district 1793–1797	Succeeded by John Dennis
Diplomatic posts
Preceded by John Quincy Adams	U.S. Minister to the Netherlands; 1797–1801	Succeeded by William Eustis
