= Georgetown, Virginia =

Unincorporated community in Virginia, US

Coordinates: 37.83180°N 76.44634°W

Georgetown is an unincorporated community in Northumberland County, in the U.S. state of Virginia.
