= Benjamin Huntington =

American politician

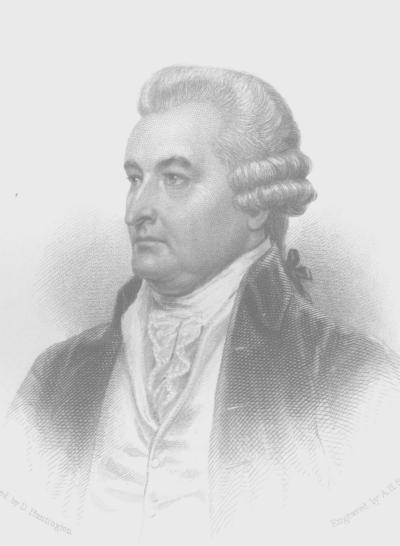

Member of the U.S. House of Representatives from Connecticut's at-large district
- In office March 4, 1789 – March 3, 1791
- Preceded by: Constituency established
- Succeeded by: James Hillhouse

Member of the Pennsylvania Senate
- In office 1791-1793

Personal details
- Born: April 19, 1736 Norwich, Connecticut Colony, British America
- Died: October 16, 1800 (aged 64) Rome, New York, U.S.
- Party: Pro-Administration Party
- Spouse: Anne Huntington
- Education: Yale College
- Occupation: Lawyer, Jurist, Politician

Benjamin Huntington (April 19, 1736 – October 16, 1800) was an eighteenth-century American lawyer, jurist and politician from Connecticut and served as a delegate to the Second Continental Congress and as a member of the U.S. House of Representatives during the First United States Congress.

== Early life and career ==
Huntington was born in Norwich in the Connecticut Colony, the only child of Daniel Huntington and his second wife Rachel (Wolcott) Huntington. He graduated from Yale College in 1761 and was appointed surveyor of lands for Windham County in October 1764. Huntington studied law and was admitted to the bar in 1765. He began the practice of law in Norwich. Yale College later bestowed an LL.D upon Huntington.

Huntington served as a member of the Connecticut House of Representatives from 1771 to 1780 and served as speaker of that body in 1778 and 1779. In 1775, he served on the committee of safety in the State House and was appointed to advise with Governor Jonathan Trumbull during the recess of the legislature. In 1778, Huntington was appointed a delegate to the Provincial Congress at New Haven.

From 1780 to 1784, and again in 1787 and 1788, Huntington was a member of the Continental Congress. He served on the Connecticut council of assistants from 1781 to 1789 and from 1791 to 1792. Huntington served as a member of the State Senate from 1781 to 1790 and from 1791 to 1793, also serving as a judge of the Connecticut Supreme Court of Errors from 1784 to 1790, and again from 1791 to 1793. When the new government went into operation in 1789, he was chosen to represent Connecticut in the First Congress of the United States as a Pro-Administration Party candidate, serving from March 4, 1789, to March 3, 1791.

On the incorporation of Norwich in 1784, he was elected its first Mayor, serving until his resignation in 1796. In 1793, he was appointed judge of the superior court of Connecticut, holding this office until 1798.

== Personal life ==
Huntington married Anne Huntington, of Windham, Connecticut, on May 5, 1765. She died on October 6, 1790, in Norwich. Their son was named Benjamin Huntington.

== Death ==
Huntington died on October 16, 1800, in Rome, New York, and is interred in the Old Colony Cemetery in Norwich.

U.S. House of Representatives
Preceded by District created	Member of the U.S. House of Representatives from Connecticut's at-large congressional district 1789–1791	Succeeded by James Hillhouse
