= George Gale (Maryland politician) =

American politician (1756–1815)

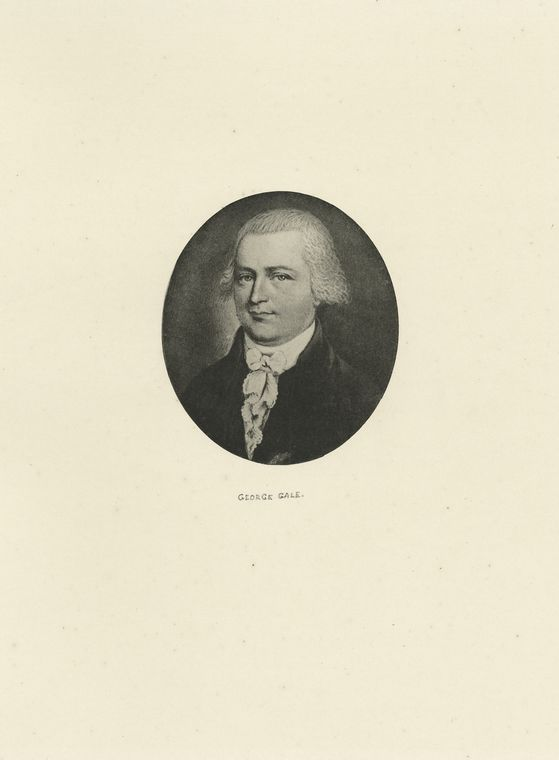
George Gale

George Gale (June 3, 1756 – January 2, 1815) was an American politician and the first representative of the fifth congressional district of Maryland.

Gale was born in Somerset County in the Province of Maryland in 1756. He attended public school and served in the Continental Army during the American Revolutionary War. When Maryland convened its convention to ratify the United States Constitution in 1788, Gale was a member. He was then elected to the First United States Congress as a member of the House of Representatives; he had also narrowly lost as a candidate for the U.S. Senate in that Congress, receiving 40 votes from the Maryland legislature against John Henry's 42. He served from 1789 to 1791, when George Washington appointed him supervisor of distilled liquors for the district of Maryland.

Gale died in Cecil County, Maryland in 1815. He is buried in what was formerly the Gale family cemetery. It is now on the grounds of St. Mark's Episcopal Church in Perryville, MD.

His son, Levin Gale, later followed in George's footsteps and became a U.S. Representative.

In World War II, the United States Liberty ship SS George Gale was named in his honor.

U.S. House of Representatives
Preceded by (None)	Representative of the Fifth Congressional District of Maryland; 1789–1791	Succeeded by William V. Murray
