= Political party strength in Pennsylvania =

Politics in the US state of Pennsylvania

== Partisan identification in the electorate ==
On August 10, 2026, the Pennsylvania Department of State reported that there were 3,842,840 (42.8%) registered Democrats, 3,635,181 (40.5%) registered Republicans, 1,183,935 (13.1%) registered unaffiliated and 314,412 (3.5%) registered with other parties.

== Partisan affiliation of elected officials ==
The following table indicates the party of elected officials in the U.S. state of Pennsylvania:

- Governor
- Lieutenant governor
- Attorney general
- State auditor general
- State treasurer

The table also indicates the historical party composition in the:

- State senate
- State house of representatives
- State delegation to the United States Senate
- State delegation to the United States House of Representatives

Following the 2020 Census, Pennsylvania lost one seat in the U.S. House of Representatives. As a result, starting with the general election of 2022, Pennsylvania sent 17 members to the house, and beginning with the general election of 2024 has 19 electoral votes.

=== 1777–1790 ===
Year	Executive offices		State Legislature	United States Congress			Electoral votes
Year	President (Note: From 1777 to 1790, Pennsylvania had a series of presidents and vice presidents of The Supreme Council.)	Vice President	Executive Council	Senator (Class I)	Senator (Class III)	House	Electoral votes
1777	Thomas Wharton Jr. (CS)	George Bryan (CS)	51CS, 15RS, 6?	began in 1789			
1778	George Bryan (CS)	George Bryan (CS)	54CS, 7?, 5RS	began in 1789			
1779	Joseph Reed (CS)	Matthew Smith	43CS, 26RS, 3?	began in 1789			
1780	Joseph Reed (CS)	William Moore (I)	51CS, 14RS, 7?	began in 1789			
1781	Joseph Reed (CS)	William Moore (I)	41CS, 31RS	began in 1789			
1782	William Moore (I)	James Potter (CS)	38CS, 36RS	began in 1789			
1783	John Dickinson (RS)	James Ewing (RS)	39RS, 34CS, 1?	began in 1789			
1784	John Dickinson (RS)	James Ewing (RS)	44RS, 29CS	began in 1789			
1785	John Dickinson (RS)	James Irvine (CS)	56CS, 18RS	began in 1789			
1786	Benjamin Franklin (I)	Charles Biddle	38RS, 37CS	began in 1789			
1787	Benjamin Franklin (I)	Charles Biddle	41RS, 28CS	began in 1789			
1788	Benjamin Franklin (I)	Peter Muhlenberg	37RS, 32CS	began in 1789			
1789	Thomas Mifflin (RS)	George Ross	47RS, 22CS	William Maclay (AA)	Robert Morris (PA)	6PA, 2AA	George Washington (I) / John Adams (F) ✓
1790	Thomas Mifflin (RS)	George Ross	42RS, 27CS	William Maclay (AA)	Robert Morris (PA)	6PA, 2AA	George Washington (I) / John Adams (F) ✓

=== 1791–1872 ===
Year	Executive offices		State Legislature		United States Congress			Electoral votes
Year	Governor	Auditor General	Senate	House	Senator (Class I)	Senator (Class III)	House	Electoral votes
1791	Thomas Mifflin (F)	not an elected office	10F, 8DR	36F, 33DR	vacant	Robert Morris (PA)	4PA, 4AA	
1792	Thomas Mifflin (F)	not an elected office	10F, 8DR	42F, 27DR	vacant	Robert Morris (PA)	4PA, 4AA	George Washington (I) / John Adams (F) ✓
1793	Thomas Mifflin (F)	not an elected office	9F, 9DR (Note: A Federalist, Anthony Morris, was elected as Speaker of the chamber.)	42F, 27DR	vacant	Robert Morris (PA)	8AA, 5PA	George Washington (I) / John Adams (F) ✓
1794	Thomas Mifflin (F)	not an elected office	10F, 8DR	48F, 21DR	Albert Gallatin (AA)	Robert Morris (PA)	8AA, 5PA	George Washington (I) / John Adams (F) ✓
1794	Thomas Mifflin (F)	not an elected office	10F, 8DR	48F, 21DR	James Ross (PA)	Robert Morris (PA)	8AA, 5PA	George Washington (I) / John Adams (F) ✓
1795	Thomas Mifflin (F)	not an elected office	14F, 10DR	49F, 29DR	James Ross (F)	William Bingham (F)	8DR, 5F	George Washington (I) / John Adams (F) ✓
1796	Thomas Mifflin (F)	not an elected office	15F, 9DR	45F, 33DR	James Ross (F)	William Bingham (F)	7DR, 6F	Thomas Jefferson (DR) ✗ / John Adams (F) ✗
1797	Thomas Mifflin (F)	not an elected office	15F, 9DR	44F, 34DR	James Ross (F)	William Bingham (F)	8DR, 5F	Thomas Jefferson (DR) ✗ / John Adams (F) ✗
1798	Thomas Mifflin (F)	not an elected office	15F, 9DR	41F, 37DR	James Ross (F)	William Bingham (F)	8DR, 5F	Thomas Jefferson (DR) ✗ / John Adams (F) ✗
1799	Thomas Mifflin (F)	not an elected office	15F, 9DR	47F, 31DR	James Ross (F)	William Bingham (F)	9DR, 4F	Thomas Jefferson (DR) ✗ / John Adams (F) ✗
1800	Thomas McKean (DR)	not an elected office	16F, 8DR	41DR, 37F	James Ross (F)	William Bingham (F)	9DR, 4F	Thomas Jefferson (DR) ✓ / John Adams (F) ✗
1801	Thomas McKean (DR)	not an elected office	13F, 11DR	55DR, 23F	James Ross (F)	Peter Muhlenberg (DR)	10DR, 3F	Thomas Jefferson (DR) ✓ / John Adams (F) ✗
1801	Thomas McKean (DR)	not an elected office	13F, 11DR	55DR, 23F	James Ross (F)	George Logan (DR)	10DR, 3F	Thomas Jefferson (DR) ✓ / John Adams (F) ✗
1802	Thomas McKean (DR)	not an elected office	17DR, 8F	71DR, 15F	James Ross (F)	George Logan (DR)	10DR, 3F	Thomas Jefferson (DR) ✓ / John Adams (F) ✗
1803	Thomas McKean (DR)	not an elected office	21DR, 4F	77DR, 9F	Samuel Maclay (DR)	George Logan (DR)	18DR	Thomas Jefferson (DR) ✓ / John Adams (F) ✗
1804	Thomas McKean (DR)	not an elected office	24DR, 1F	81DR, 5F	Samuel Maclay (DR)	George Logan (DR)	18DR	Thomas Jefferson/ George Clinton (DR) ✓
1805	Thomas McKean (DR)	not an elected office	25DR	78DR, 8F	Samuel Maclay (DR)	George Logan (DR)	17DR, 1F	Thomas Jefferson/ George Clinton (DR) ✓
1806	Thomas McKean (Quid)	not an elected office	15Const, 10DR (Note: The Federalists and Quids, who were moderates within the Democratic-Republican Party, formed a coalition in the 1805 election and called themselves the Constitutionalists; when they achieved a majority, they organized the chamber together, and this coalition continued in succeeding elections.)	53Const, 33DR	Samuel Maclay (DR)	George Logan (DR)	17DR, 1F	Thomas Jefferson/ George Clinton (DR) ✓
1807	Thomas McKean (Quid)	not an elected office	13Const, 12DR	46DR, 40Const	Samuel Maclay (DR)	Andrew Gregg (DR)	15DR, 3F	Thomas Jefferson/ George Clinton (DR) ✓
1808	Thomas McKean (Quid)	not an elected office	14DR, 7Quid, 4F	43DR, 23F, 20Quid (Note: Elected Nathaniel Boileau, a Democratic-Republican, as Speaker.)	Samuel Maclay (DR)	Andrew Gregg (DR)	15DR, 3F	James Madison/ George Clinton (DR) ✓
1809	Simon Snyder (DR)	not an elected office	19DR, 7Quid, 5F	74DR, 21F	Michael Leib (DR)	Andrew Gregg (DR)	16DR, 2F	James Madison/ George Clinton (DR) ✓
1810	Simon Snyder (DR)	not an elected office	22DR, 6F, 3Quid	73DR, 15F, 7Quid	Michael Leib (DR)	Andrew Gregg (DR)	16DR, 2F	James Madison/ George Clinton (DR) ✓
1811	Simon Snyder (DR)	not an elected office	21DR, 7F, 3Quid	72DR, 17F, 6Quid	Michael Leib (DR)	Andrew Gregg (DR)	17DR, 1F	James Madison/ George Clinton (DR) ✓
1812	Simon Snyder (DR)	not an elected office	26DR, 5F	84DR, 11F	Michael Leib (DR)	Andrew Gregg (DR)	17DR, 1F	James Madison/ Elbridge Gerry (DR) ✓
1813	Simon Snyder (DR)	not an elected office	26DR, 5F	77DR, 18F	Michael Leib (DR)	Abner Lacock (DR)	22DR, 1F	James Madison/ Elbridge Gerry (DR) ✓
1814	Simon Snyder (DR)	not an elected office	25DR, 6F	85DR, 10F	Jonathan Roberts (DR)	Abner Lacock (DR)	21DR, 2F	James Madison/ Elbridge Gerry (DR) ✓
1815	Simon Snyder (DR)	not an elected office	21DR, 10F	71DR, 24F	Jonathan Roberts (DR)	Abner Lacock (DR)	19DR, 4F	James Madison/ Elbridge Gerry (DR) ✓
1816	Simon Snyder (DR)	not an elected office	19DR, 12F	71DR, 26F	Jonathan Roberts (DR)	Abner Lacock (DR)	19DR, 4F	James Monroe/ Daniel D. Tompkins (DR) ✓
1817	Simon Snyder (DR)	not an elected office	19DR, 12F	57DR, 30F, 10Quid	Jonathan Roberts (DR)	Abner Lacock (DR)	19DR, 4F	James Monroe/ Daniel D. Tompkins (DR) ✓
1818	William Findlay (DR)	not an elected office	19DR, 12F	55DR, 42F (Note: Some sources begin to cite the Federalists at the state level as Independent Republicans starting with this year.)	Jonathan Roberts (DR)	Abner Lacock (DR)	19DR, 4F	James Monroe/ Daniel D. Tompkins (DR) ✓
1819	William Findlay (DR)	not an elected office	20DR, 11F	64DR, 33F	Jonathan Roberts (DR)	Walter Lowrie (DR)	19DR, 4F	James Monroe/ Daniel D. Tompkins (DR) ✓
1820	William Findlay (DR)	not an elected office	23DR, 6F, 2Quid	67DR, 24F, 6Quid	Jonathan Roberts (DR)	Walter Lowrie (DR)	18DR, 5F	James Monroe/ Daniel D. Tompkins (DR) ✓
1821	Joseph Hiester (DR)	not an elected office	20DR, 11F	52F, 45DR	vacant	Walter Lowrie (DR)	15DR, 8F	James Monroe/ Daniel D. Tompkins (DR) ✓
1822	Joseph Hiester (DR)	not an elected office	17DR, 14F	67DR, 30F	William Findlay (DR)	Walter Lowrie (DR)	16DR, 7F	James Monroe/ Daniel D. Tompkins (DR) ✓
1823	Joseph Hiester (DR)	not an elected office	23DR, 10F	71DR, 29F	William Findlay (DR)	Walter Lowrie (DR)	20DR, 6F	James Monroe/ Daniel D. Tompkins (DR) ✓
1824	John Andrew Shulze (DR)	not an elected office	21DR, 11F, 1?	77DR, 23F	William Findlay (DR)	Walter Lowrie (DR)	20DR, 6F	Andrew Jackson/ John C. Calhoun (DR) ✗
1825	John Andrew Shulze (DR)	not an elected office	26DR, 7F	79DR, 21F	William Findlay (J)	William Marks (NR)	14J, 11DR, 1F	Andrew Jackson/ John C. Calhoun (DR) ✗
1826	John Andrew Shulze (DR)	not an elected office	27DR, 6F	77DR, 23F	William Findlay (J)	William Marks (NR)	17J, 9DR	Andrew Jackson/ John C. Calhoun (DR) ✗
1827	John Andrew Shulze (DR)	not an elected office	27DR, 6F	74DR, 26F	Isaac D. Barnard (J)	William Marks (NR)	22J, 3DR, 1NR	Andrew Jackson/ John C. Calhoun (DR) ✗
1828	John Andrew Shulze (DR)	not an elected office	26J, 7NR	76J, 22NR, 2 vac.	Isaac D. Barnard (J)	William Marks (NR)	22J, 3DR, 1NR	Andrew Jackson/ John C. Calhoun (D) ✓
1829	John Andrew Shulze (DR)	not an elected office	26J, 7NR	89J, 11NR	Isaac D. Barnard (J)	William Marks (NR)	24J, 1A-M, 1NR	Andrew Jackson/ John C. Calhoun (D) ✓
1830	George Wolf (J)	not an elected office	26J, 6NR, 1A-M	87J, 13A-M	Isaac D. Barnard (J)	William Marks (NR)	24J, 1A-M, 1NR	Andrew Jackson/ John C. Calhoun (D) ✓
1831	George Wolf (J)	not an elected office	25J, 5NR, 4A-M	72J, 28A-M	Isaac D. Barnard (J)	William Wilkins (J)	17J, 7A-M, 2NR	Andrew Jackson/ John C. Calhoun (D) ✓
1832	George Wolf (J)	not an elected office	23J, 6A-M, 4NR	74J, 22A-M, 4NR	George M. Dallas (J)	William Wilkins (J)	17J, 7A-M, 2NR	Andrew Jackson/ Martin Van Buren (D) ✓
1833	George Wolf (J)	not an elected office	22J, 9A-M, 2NR	61J, 33A-M, 5NR, 1?	Samuel McKean (J)	William Wilkins (J)	14J, 10A-M, 4NR	Andrew Jackson/ Martin Van Buren (D) ✓
1834	George Wolf (J)	not an elected office	24J, 7A-M, 2NR	64J, 25A-M, 11NR	Samuel McKean (J)	William Wilkins (J)	14J, 10A-M, 4NR	Andrew Jackson/ Martin Van Buren (D) ✓
1835	George Wolf (J)	not an elected office	25J, 6A-M, 2W	62J, 27A-M, 11W	Samuel McKean (J)	James Buchanan (J)	17J, 7A-M, 4NR	Andrew Jackson/ Martin Van Buren (D) ✓
1836	Joseph Ritner (A-M)	not an elected office	23D, 9A-M, 1W	72A-M/W, 28D	Samuel McKean (J)	James Buchanan (J)	17J, 7A-M, 4NR	Martin Van Buren/ Richard Mentor Johnson (D) ✓
1837	Joseph Ritner (A-M)	not an elected office	15D, 12W, 6A-M (Note: The Whigs and Anti-Masons formed a coalition to govern the chamber.)	72D, 21A-M, 7W	Samuel McKean (D)	James Buchanan (D)	16D, 7A-M, 3W, 2J	Martin Van Buren/ Richard Mentor Johnson (D) ✓
1838	Joseph Ritner (A-M)	not an elected office	19W, 14D	56D, 44W	Samuel McKean (D)	James Buchanan (D)	16D, 7A-M, 3W, 2J	Martin Van Buren/ Richard Mentor Johnson (D) ✓
1839	David R. Porter (D)	not an elected office	18W, 15D	56D, 44W	vacant	James Buchanan (D)	17D, 6W, 5A-M	Martin Van Buren/ Richard Mentor Johnson (D) ✓
1840	David R. Porter (D)	not an elected office	17D, 16W	69D, 31W	Daniel Sturgeon (D)	James Buchanan (D)	17D, 6W, 5A-M	William Henry Harrison/ John Tyler (W) ✓
1841	David R. Porter (D)	not an elected office	20W, 13D	55W, 45D	Daniel Sturgeon (D)	James Buchanan (D)	15D, 13W	William Henry Harrison/ John Tyler (W) ✓
1842	David R. Porter (D)	not an elected office	17W, 16D	64D, 34W, 2WM	Daniel Sturgeon (D)	James Buchanan (D)	15D, 13W	William Henry Harrison/ John Tyler (W) ✓
1843	David R. Porter (D)	not an elected office	19D, 14W	57D, 40W, 2WM, 1I	Daniel Sturgeon (D)	James Buchanan (D)	12D, 12W	William Henry Harrison/ John Tyler (W) ✓
1844	David R. Porter (D)	not an elected office	22D, 11W	58D, 42W	Daniel Sturgeon (D)	James Buchanan (D)	13W, 11D	James K. Polk/ George M. Dallas (D) ✓
1845	Francis R. Shunk (D)	not an elected office	21D, 11W, 1KN	51D, 41W, 8KN	Daniel Sturgeon (D)	Simon Cameron (D)	12D, 10W, 2KN	James K. Polk/ George M. Dallas (D) ✓
1846	Francis R. Shunk (D)	not an elected office	18W, 14D, 1KN	67D, 33W	Daniel Sturgeon (D)	Simon Cameron (D)	12D, 10W, 2KN	James K. Polk/ George M. Dallas (D) ✓
1847	Francis R. Shunk (D)	not an elected office	18W, 14D, 1KN	56W, 44D	Daniel Sturgeon (D)	Simon Cameron (D)	16W, 7D, 1KN	James K. Polk/ George M. Dallas (D) ✓
1848	Francis R. Shunk (D)	not an elected office	19W, 14D	64D, 36W	Daniel Sturgeon (D)	Simon Cameron (D)	15W, 8D, 1KN	Zachary Taylor/ Millard Fillmore (W) ✓
1848	William F. Johnston (W)	not an elected office	19W, 14D	64D, 36W	Daniel Sturgeon (D)	Simon Cameron (D)	15W, 8D, 1KN	Zachary Taylor/ Millard Fillmore (W) ✓
1849	William F. Johnston (W)	not an elected office	21W, 12D	50D, 45W, 5KN (Note: A Democrat, William F. Packer, was elected as Speaker, and Democrats organized the chamber.)	Daniel Sturgeon (D)	James Cooper (W)	11W, 11D, 1KN, 1FS	Zachary Taylor/ Millard Fillmore (W) ✓
1850	William F. Johnston (W)	not an elected office	17D, 16W	59D, 41W	Daniel Sturgeon (D)	James Cooper (W)	11W, 11D, 1KN, 1FS	Zachary Taylor/ Millard Fillmore (W) ✓
1851	William F. Johnston (W)	Ephraim Banks (D)	16W, 16D, 1I (Note: A Whig, Benjamin Matthias, was elected as Speaker of the Senate on the 7th Ballot.)	60D, 36W, 2ID, 1IW, 1 vac.	Richard Brodhead (D)	James Cooper (W)	15D, 9W	Zachary Taylor/ Millard Fillmore (W) ✓
1852	William Bigler (D)	Ephraim Banks (D)	17W, 16D	58D, 37W, 5KN	Richard Brodhead (D)	James Cooper (W)	15D, 9W	Franklin Pierce/ William R. King (D) ✓
1853	William Bigler (D)	Ephraim Banks (D)	17W, 15D, 1KN	62D, 38W	Richard Brodhead (D)	James Cooper (W)	16D, 9W	Franklin Pierce/ William R. King (D) ✓
1854	William Bigler (D)	Ephraim Banks (D)	18D, 14W, 1KN	70D, 26W, 4KN	Richard Brodhead (D)	James Cooper (W)	16D, 9W	Franklin Pierce/ William R. King (D) ✓
1855	James Pollock (W)	Ephraim Banks (D)	17D, 15W, 1KN	46W, 32D, 22KN (Note: A Whig, Henry K. Strong, was elected in a coalition between the Whigs and Know-Nothings.)	Richard Brodhead (D)	vacant	13O, 7D, 3W, 1R, 1KN	Franklin Pierce/ William R. King (D) ✓
1856	James Pollock (W)	Ephraim Banks (D)	17D, 16Fus	66D, 34Fus	Richard Brodhead (D)	William Bigler (D)	13O, 7D, 3W, 1R, 1KN	James Buchanan/ John C. Breckinridge (D) ✓
1857	James Pollock (W)	Jacob Fry Jr. (D)	18Fus, 15D	53D, 47Fus	Simon Cameron (R)	William Bigler (D)	15D, 10R	James Buchanan/ John C. Breckinridge (D) ✓
1858	William F. Packer (D)	Jacob Fry Jr. (D)	21D, 12R	68D, 30R, 2I	Simon Cameron (R)	William Bigler (D)	14D, 11R	James Buchanan/ John C. Breckinridge (D) ✓
1859	William F. Packer (D)	Jacob Fry Jr. (D)	17D, 16R	67R, 33D	Simon Cameron (R)	William Bigler (D)	20R, 5D	James Buchanan/ John C. Breckinridge (D) ✓
1860	William F. Packer (D)	Thomas E. Cochran (R)	21R, 12D	66R, 34D	Simon Cameron (R)	William Bigler (D)	20R, 5D	Abraham Lincoln/ Hannibal Hamlin (R) ✓
1861	Andrew Gregg Curtin (R)	Thomas E. Cochran (R)	27R, 6D	71R, 29D	David Wilmot (R)	Edgar Cowan (R)	19R, 6D	Abraham Lincoln/ Hannibal Hamlin (R) ✓
1862	Andrew Gregg Curtin (R)	Thomas E. Cochran (R)	23R, 10D	51D, 49R	David Wilmot (R)	Edgar Cowan (R)	17R, 8D	Abraham Lincoln/ Hannibal Hamlin (R) ✓
1863	Andrew Gregg Curtin (R)	Isaac Slenker (D)	21R, 12D	55D, 45R	Charles R. Buckalew (D)	Edgar Cowan (R)	12R, 12D	Abraham Lincoln/ Hannibal Hamlin (R) ✓
1864	Andrew Gregg Curtin (R)	Isaac Slenker (D)	17R, 16D	52R, 48D	Charles R. Buckalew (D)	Edgar Cowan (R)	12R, 12D	Abraham Lincoln/ Andrew Johnson (NU) ✓
1865	Andrew Gregg Curtin (R)	Isaac Slenker (D)	20R, 13D	64R, 36D	Charles R. Buckalew (D)	Edgar Cowan (R)	15R, 9D	Abraham Lincoln/ Andrew Johnson (NU) ✓
1866	Andrew Gregg Curtin (R)	John F. Hartranft (R)	21R, 12D	67R, 33D	Charles R. Buckalew (D)	Edgar Cowan (R)	16R, 8D	Abraham Lincoln/ Andrew Johnson (NU) ✓
1867	John W. Geary (R)	John F. Hartranft (R)	21R, 12D	62R, 38D	Charles R. Buckalew (D)	Simon Cameron (R)	18R, 6D	Abraham Lincoln/ Andrew Johnson (NU) ✓
1868	John W. Geary (R)	John F. Hartranft (R)	19R, 14D	54R, 46D	Charles R. Buckalew (D)	Simon Cameron (R)	18R, 6D	Ulysses S. Grant/ Schuyler Colfax (R) ✓
1869	John W. Geary (R)	John F. Hartranft (R)	18R, 15D	62R, 38D	John Scott (R)	Simon Cameron (R)	16R, 8D	Ulysses S. Grant/ Schuyler Colfax (R) ✓
1870	John W. Geary (R)	John F. Hartranft (R)	18R, 15D	60R, 40D	John Scott (R)	Simon Cameron (R)	18R, 6D	Ulysses S. Grant/ Schuyler Colfax (R) ✓
1871	John W. Geary (R)	John F. Hartranft (R)	17D, 16R	55R, 45D	John Scott (R)	Simon Cameron (R)	13R, 11D	Ulysses S. Grant/ Schuyler Colfax (R) ✓
1872	John W. Geary (R)	John F. Hartranft (R)	17R, 16D	63R, 39D, 1I	John Scott (R)	Simon Cameron (R)	13R, 11D	Ulysses S. Grant/ Henry Wilson (R) ✓
1872	John W. Geary (R)	C. D. Brigham	17R, 16D	63R, 39D, 1I	John Scott (R)	Simon Cameron (R)	13R, 11D	Ulysses S. Grant/ Henry Wilson (R) ✓

=== 1873–1978 ===
Year	Executive offices				State Legislature		United States Congress			Electoral votes
Year	Governor	Lieutenant Governor	Auditor General	Treasurer	Senate	House	Senator (Class I)	Senator (Class III)	House	Electoral votes
1873	John F. Hartranft (R)	no such office	Harrison Allen (R)	Robert W. Mackey (R)	18R, 14D, 1LR	60R, 39D, 1I	John Scott (R)	Simon Cameron (R)	22R, 5D	
1874	John F. Hartranft (R)	no such office	Harrison Allen (R)	Robert W. Mackey (R)	20R, 12D, 1LR	57R, 43D	John Scott (R)	Simon Cameron (R)	22R, 5D	
1875	John F. Hartranft (R)	John Latta (D)	Justus F. Temple (D)	Robert W. Mackey (R)	30R, 20D (Note: Effective with the Constitution of 1874, Senators began to serve four-year terms, after a transition period starting with the election of 1874 and continuing through the election of 1876.)	110D, 89R, 1I, 1Proh (Note: Effective with the Constitution of 1874, House members began to serve two-year terms starting with the election of 1874.)	William A. Wallace (D)	Simon Cameron (R)	17D, 10R	
1876	John F. Hartranft (R)	John Latta (D)	Justus F. Temple (D)	Henry Rawle (R)	29R, 21D	110D, 89R, 1I, 1Proh	William A. Wallace (D)	Simon Cameron (R)	18D, 9R	Rutherford B. Hayes/ William A. Wheeler (R) ✓
1877	John F. Hartranft (R)	John Latta (D)	Justus F. Temple (D)	Henry Rawle (R)	31R, 19D	119R, 81D, 1ID	William A. Wallace (D)	J. Donald Cameron (R)	17R, 10D	Rutherford B. Hayes/ William A. Wheeler (R) ✓
1878	John F. Hartranft (R)	John Latta (D)	William P. Schell (D)	Amos C. Noyes (D)	31R, 19D	119R, 81D, 1ID	William A. Wallace (D)	J. Donald Cameron (R)	17R, 10D	Rutherford B. Hayes/ William A. Wheeler (R) ✓
1879	Henry M. Hoyt (R)	Charles W. Stone (R)	William P. Schell (D)	Amos C. Noyes (D)	32R, 17D, 1GB	107R, 77D, 17GB	William A. Wallace (D)	J. Donald Cameron (R)	17R, 8D, 2GB	Rutherford B. Hayes/ William A. Wheeler (R) ✓
1880	Henry M. Hoyt (R)	Charles W. Stone (R)	William P. Schell (D)	Samuel Butler (R)	32R, 17D, 1GB	107R, 77D, 17GB	William A. Wallace (D)	J. Donald Cameron (R)	17R, 8D, 2GB	James A. Garfield/ Chester A. Arthur (R) ✓
1881	Henry M. Hoyt (R)	Charles W. Stone (R)	John A. Lemon (R)	Samuel Butler (R)	32R, 17D, 1GB	121R, 78D, 1GB, 1Fus-D	John I. Mitchell (R)	J. Donald Cameron (R)	18R, 7D, 2GB	James A. Garfield/ Chester A. Arthur (R) ✓
1882	Henry M. Hoyt (R)	Charles W. Stone (R)	John A. Lemon (R)	Silas M. Bailey (R)	32R, 17D, 1GB	121R, 78D, 1GB, 1Fus-D	John I. Mitchell (R)	J. Donald Cameron (R)	18R, 7D, 2GB	James A. Garfield/ Chester A. Arthur (R) ✓
1883	Robert E. Pattison (D)	Chauncey Forward Black (D)	John A. Lemon (R)	Silas M. Bailey (R)	30R, 20D	113D, 88R	John I. Mitchell (R)	J. Donald Cameron (R)	15R, 12D, 1GB	James A. Garfield/ Chester A. Arthur (R) ✓
1884	Robert E. Pattison (D)	Chauncey Forward Black (D)	Jerome B. Niles (R)	William Livsey (R)	30R, 20D	113D, 88R	John I. Mitchell (R)	J. Donald Cameron (R)	15R, 12D, 1GB	James G. Blaine/ John A. Logan (R) ✗
1885	Robert E. Pattison (D)	Chauncey Forward Black (D)	Jerome B. Niles (R)	William Livsey (R)	31R, 19D	140R, 60D, 1GBR	John I. Mitchell (R)	J. Donald Cameron (R)	20R, 8D	James G. Blaine/ John A. Logan (R) ✗
1886	Robert E. Pattison (D)	Chauncey Forward Black (D)	Jerome B. Niles (R)	Matthew Quay (R)	31R, 19D	140R, 60D, 1GBR	John I. Mitchell (R)	J. Donald Cameron (R)	20R, 8D	James G. Blaine/ John A. Logan (R) ✗
1887	James A. Beaver (R)	William T. Davies (R)	A. Wilson Norris (Note: Died in office.)	William Livsey (R)	34R, 16D	131R, 69D, 1GBL	Matthew Quay (R)	J. Donald Cameron (R)	20R, 8D	James G. Blaine/ John A. Logan (R) ✗
1888	James A. Beaver (R)	William T. Davies (R)	A. Wilson Norris	William B. Hart (R)	34R, 16D	131R, 69D, 1GBL	Matthew Quay (R)	J. Donald Cameron (R)	20R, 8D	Benjamin Harrison/ Levi P. Morton (R) ✓
1888	James A. Beaver (R)	William T. Davies (R)	Thomas McCamant (R)	William B. Hart (R)	34R, 16D	131R, 69D, 1GBL	Matthew Quay (R)	J. Donald Cameron (R)	20R, 8D	Benjamin Harrison/ Levi P. Morton (R) ✓
1889	James A. Beaver (R)	William T. Davies (R)	Thomas McCamant (R)	William Livsey (R)	34R, 16D	144R, 60D	Matthew Quay (R)	J. Donald Cameron (R)	21R, 7D	Benjamin Harrison/ Levi P. Morton (R) ✓
1890	James A. Beaver (R)	William T. Davies (R)	Thomas McCamant (R)	Henry K. Boyer (R)	34R, 16D	144R, 60D	Matthew Quay (R)	J. Donald Cameron (R)	21R, 7D	Benjamin Harrison/ Levi P. Morton (R) ✓
1891	Robert E. Pattison (D)	Louis Arthur Watres (R)	Thomas McCamant (R)	Henry K. Boyer (R)	31R, 19D	122R, 79D, 3Fus	Matthew Quay (R)	J. Donald Cameron (R)	18R, 10D	Benjamin Harrison/ Levi P. Morton (R) ✓
1892	Robert E. Pattison (D)	Louis Arthur Watres (R)	David McMurtrie Gregg (R)	John Wallace Morrison (R)	31R, 19D	122R, 79D, 3Fus	Matthew Quay (R)	J. Donald Cameron (R)	17R, 11D	Benjamin Harrison/ Whitelaw Reid (R) ✗
1893	Robert E. Pattison (D)	Louis Arthur Watres (R)	David McMurtrie Gregg (R)	John Wallace Morrison (R)	33R, 17D	135R, 69D	Matthew Quay (R)	J. Donald Cameron (R)	20R, 10D	Benjamin Harrison/ Whitelaw Reid (R) ✗
1894	Robert E. Pattison (D)	Louis Arthur Watres (R)	David McMurtrie Gregg (R)	Samuel Jackson (R)	33R, 17D	135R, 69D	Matthew Quay (R)	J. Donald Cameron (R)	20R, 10D	Benjamin Harrison/ Whitelaw Reid (R) ✗
1895	Daniel H. Hastings (R)	Walter Lyon (R)	Amos H. Mylin	Samuel Jackson (R)	44R, 6D	175R, 29D	Matthew Quay (R)	J. Donald Cameron (R)	28R, 2D	Benjamin Harrison/ Whitelaw Reid (R) ✗
1896	Daniel H. Hastings (R)	Walter Lyon (R)	Amos H. Mylin	Benjamin J. Haywood (R)	44R, 6D	175R, 29D	Matthew Quay (R)	J. Donald Cameron (R)	28R, 2D	William McKinley/ Garret Hobart (R) ✓
1897	Daniel H. Hastings (R)	Walter Lyon (R)	Amos H. Mylin	Benjamin J. Haywood (R)	44R, 6D	172R, 32D	Matthew Quay (R)	Boies Penrose (R)	27R, 3D	William McKinley/ Garret Hobart (R) ✓
1898	Daniel H. Hastings (R)	Walter Lyon (R)	Levi G. McCauley (R)	James S. Beacom (R)	44R, 6D	172R, 32D	Matthew Quay (R)	Boies Penrose (R)	27R, 3D	William McKinley/ Garret Hobart (R) ✓
1899	William A. Stone (R)	John P. S. Gobin (R)	Levi G. McCauley (R)	James S. Beacom (R)	37R, 13D	127R, 71D, 6Fus	vacant	Boies Penrose (R)	20R, 10D	William McKinley/ Garret Hobart (R) ✓
1900	William A. Stone (R)	John P. S. Gobin (R)	Levi G. McCauley (R)	James E. Barnett (R)	37R, 13D	127R, 71D, 6Fus	vacant	Boies Penrose (R)	20R, 10D	William McKinley/ Theodore Roosevelt (R) ✓
1901	William A. Stone (R)	John P. S. Gobin (R)	Edmund B. Hardenbergh (R)	James E. Barnett (R)	38R, 12D	156R, 48D	Matthew Quay (R)	Boies Penrose (R)	26R, 4D	William McKinley/ Theodore Roosevelt (R) ✓
1902	William A. Stone (R)	John P. S. Gobin (R)	Edmund B. Hardenbergh (R)	Frank G. Harris (R)	38R, 12D	156R, 48D	Matthew Quay (R)	Boies Penrose (R)	26R, 4D	William McKinley/ Theodore Roosevelt (R) ✓
1903	Samuel W. Pennypacker (R)	William M. Brown (R)	Edmund B. Hardenbergh (R)	Frank G. Harris (R)	40R, 10D	160R, 44D	Matthew Quay (R)	Boies Penrose (R)	28R, 4D	William McKinley/ Theodore Roosevelt (R) ✓
1904	Samuel W. Pennypacker (R)	William M. Brown (R)	William Preston Snyder (R)	William L. Mathues (R)	40R, 10D	160R, 44D	Matthew Quay (R)	Boies Penrose (R)	29R, 3D	Theodore Roosevelt/ Charles W. Fairbanks (R) ✓
1904	Samuel W. Pennypacker (R)	William M. Brown (R)	William Preston Snyder (R)	William L. Mathues (R)	40R, 10D	160R, 44D	Philander C. Knox (R)	Boies Penrose (R)	29R, 3D	Theodore Roosevelt/ Charles W. Fairbanks (R) ✓
1905	Samuel W. Pennypacker (R)	William M. Brown (R)	William Preston Snyder (R)	William L. Mathues (R)	40R, 10D	187R, 17D	Philander C. Knox (R)	Boies Penrose (R)	31R, 1D	Theodore Roosevelt/ Charles W. Fairbanks (R) ✓
1906	Samuel W. Pennypacker (R)	William M. Brown (R)	William Preston Snyder (R)	William H. Berry (D)	40R, 10D	187R, 17D	Philander C. Knox (R)	Boies Penrose (R)	31R, 1D	Theodore Roosevelt/ Charles W. Fairbanks (R) ✓
1907	Edwin Sydney Stuart (R)	Robert S. Murphy (R)	Robert K. Young (R)	William H. Berry (D)	40R, 10D	157R, 50D	Philander C. Knox (R)	Boies Penrose (R)	25R, 7D	Theodore Roosevelt/ Charles W. Fairbanks (R) ✓
1908	Edwin Sydney Stuart (R)	Robert S. Murphy (R)	Robert K. Young (R)	John O. Sheatz (R)	40R, 10D	157R, 50D	Philander C. Knox (R)	Boies Penrose (R)	25R, 7D	William Howard Taft/ James S. Sherman (R) ✓
1909	Edwin Sydney Stuart (R)	Robert S. Murphy (R)	Robert K. Young (R)	John O. Sheatz (R)	39R, 11D	173R, 34D	George T. Oliver (R)	Boies Penrose (R)	27R, 5D	William Howard Taft/ James S. Sherman (R) ✓
1910	Edwin Sydney Stuart (R)	Robert S. Murphy (R)	A. E. Sisson (R)	John O. Sheatz (R)	39R, 11D	173R, 34D	George T. Oliver (R)	Boies Penrose (R)	27R, 5D	William Howard Taft/ James S. Sherman (R) ✓
1911	John K. Tener (R)	John Merriman Reynolds (R)	A. E. Sisson (R)	Charles Frederick Wright (R)	38R, 18D	162R, 44D, 1Soc	George T. Oliver (R)	Boies Penrose (R)	23R, 9D	William Howard Taft/ James S. Sherman (R) ✓
1912	John K. Tener (R)	John Merriman Reynolds (R)	A. E. Sisson (R)	Charles Frederick Wright (R)	38R, 18D	162R, 44D, 1Soc	George T. Oliver (R)	Boies Penrose (R)	24R, 8D	Theodore Roosevelt/ Hiram Johnson (Prog) ✗
1913	John K. Tener (R)	John Merriman Reynolds (R)	Archibald W. Powell (R)	Robert K. Young (R)	34R, 13D, 3Prog	127R, 57D, 14Prog, 9Wash	George T. Oliver (R)	Boies Penrose (R)	22R, 12D, 2Prog	Theodore Roosevelt/ Hiram Johnson (Prog) ✗
1914	John K. Tener (R)	John Merriman Reynolds (R)	Archibald W. Powell (R)	Robert K. Young (R)	34R, 13D, 3Prog	127R, 57D, 14Prog, 9Wash	George T. Oliver (R)	Boies Penrose (R)	22R, 12D, 2Prog	Theodore Roosevelt/ Hiram Johnson (Prog) ✗
1915	Martin Grove Brumbaugh (R)	Frank B. McClain (R)	Archibald W. Powell (R)	Robert K. Young (R)	38R, 11D, 1Prog	164R, 41D, 1Soc, 1Prog	George T. Oliver (R)	Boies Penrose (R)	30R, 6D	Theodore Roosevelt/ Hiram Johnson (Prog) ✗
1916	Martin Grove Brumbaugh (R)	Frank B. McClain (R)	Archibald W. Powell (R)	Robert K. Young (R)	38R, 11D, 1Prog	164R, 41D, 1Soc, 1Prog	George T. Oliver (R)	Boies Penrose (R)	30R, 6D	Charles Evans Hughes/ Charles W. Fairbanks (R) ✗
1917	Martin Grove Brumbaugh (R)	Frank B. McClain (R)	Charles A. Snyder (R)	Harmon M. Kephart (R)	39R, 10D, 1Prog	169R, 37D, 1Soc, 1Prog	Philander C. Knox (R)	Boies Penrose (R)	29R, 6D, 1Prog	Charles Evans Hughes/ Charles W. Fairbanks (R) ✗
1918	Martin Grove Brumbaugh (R)	Frank B. McClain (R)	Charles A. Snyder (R)	Harmon M. Kephart (R)	39R, 10D, 1Prog	169R, 37D, 1Soc, 1Prog	Philander C. Knox (R)	Boies Penrose (R)	28R, 7D, 1Prog	Charles Evans Hughes/ Charles W. Fairbanks (R) ✗
1919	William Cameron Sproul (R)	Edward E. Beidleman (R)	Charles A. Snyder (R)	Harmon M. Kephart (R)	44R, 6D	184R, 23D	Philander C. Knox (R)	Boies Penrose (R)	29R, 7D	Charles Evans Hughes/ Charles W. Fairbanks (R) ✗
1920	William Cameron Sproul (R)	Edward E. Beidleman (R)	Charles A. Snyder (R)	Harmon M. Kephart (R)	44R, 6D	184R, 23D	Philander C. Knox (R)	Boies Penrose (R)	30R, 6D	Warren G. Harding/ Calvin Coolidge (R) ✓
1921	William Cameron Sproul (R)	Edward E. Beidleman (R)	Samuel S. Lewis (R)	Charles A. Snyder (R)	47R, 3D	193R, 14D	Philander C. Knox (R)	Boies Penrose (R)	35R, 1D	Warren G. Harding/ Calvin Coolidge (R) ✓
1921	William Cameron Sproul (R)	Edward E. Beidleman (R)	Samuel S. Lewis (R)	Charles A. Snyder (R)	47R, 3D	193R, 14D	William E. Crow (R)	Boies Penrose (R)	35R, 1D	Warren G. Harding/ Calvin Coolidge (R) ✓
1922	William Cameron Sproul (R)	Edward E. Beidleman (R)	Samuel S. Lewis (R)	Charles A. Snyder (R)	47R, 3D	193R, 14D	William E. Crow (R)	George W. Pepper (R)	35R, 1D	Warren G. Harding/ Calvin Coolidge (R) ✓
1922	William Cameron Sproul (R)	Edward E. Beidleman (R)	Samuel S. Lewis (R)	Charles A. Snyder (R)	47R, 3D	193R, 14D	David A. Reed (R)	George W. Pepper (R)	35R, 1D	Warren G. Harding/ Calvin Coolidge (R) ✓
1923	Gifford Pinchot (R)	David J. Davis (R)	Samuel S. Lewis (R)	Charles A. Snyder (R)	43R, 7D	167R, 41D	David A. Reed (R)	George W. Pepper (R)	30R, 6D	Warren G. Harding/ Calvin Coolidge (R) ✓
1924	Gifford Pinchot (R)	David J. Davis (R)	Samuel S. Lewis (R)	Charles A. Snyder (R)	43R, 7D	167R, 41D	David A. Reed (R)	George W. Pepper (R)	30R, 6D	Calvin Coolidge/ Charles G. Dawes (R) ✓
1925	Gifford Pinchot (R)	David J. Davis (R)	Edward Martin (R)	Samuel S. Lewis (R)	42R, 8D	194R, 14D	David A. Reed (R)	George W. Pepper (R)	36R	Calvin Coolidge/ Charles G. Dawes (R) ✓
1926	Gifford Pinchot (R)	David J. Davis (R)	Edward Martin (R)	Samuel S. Lewis (R)	42R, 8D	194R, 14D	David A. Reed (R)	George W. Pepper (R)	36R	Calvin Coolidge/ Charles G. Dawes (R) ✓
1927	John Stuchell Fisher (R)	Arthur James (R)	Edward Martin (R)	Samuel S. Lewis (R)	45R, 5D	191R, 17D	David A. Reed (R)	William Scott Vare (R)	34R, 2D	Calvin Coolidge/ Charles G. Dawes (R) ✓
1928	John Stuchell Fisher (R)	Arthur James (R)	Edward Martin (R)	Samuel S. Lewis (R)	45R, 5D	191R, 17D	David A. Reed (R)	William Scott Vare (R)	34R, 2D	Herbert Hoover/ Charles Curtis (R) ✓
1929	John Stuchell Fisher (R)	Arthur James (R)	Charles A. Waters (R)	Edward Martin (R)	44R, 6D	192R, 16D	David A. Reed (R)	William Scott Vare (R)	35R, 1D	Herbert Hoover/ Charles Curtis (R) ✓
1930	John Stuchell Fisher (R)	Arthur James (R)	Charles A. Waters (R)	Edward Martin (R)	44R, 6D	192R, 16D	David A. Reed (R)	Joseph R. Grundy (R)	36R	Herbert Hoover/ Charles Curtis (R) ✓
1931	Gifford Pinchot (R)	Edward C. Shannon (R)	Charles A. Waters (R)	Edward Martin (R)	46R, 4D	184R, 22D, 2Soc	David A. Reed (R)	James J. Davis (R)	33R, 3D	Herbert Hoover/ Charles Curtis (R) ✓
1932	Gifford Pinchot (R)	Edward C. Shannon (R)	Charles A. Waters (R)	Edward Martin (R)	46R, 4D	184R, 22D, 2Soc	David A. Reed (R)	James J. Davis (R)	33R, 3D	Herbert Hoover/ Charles Curtis (R) ✗
1933	Gifford Pinchot (R)	Edward C. Shannon (R)	Frank E. Baldwin (R)	Charles A. Waters (R)	43R, 7D	140R, 65D, 2I, 1Soc	David A. Reed (R)	James J. Davis (R)	23R, 11D	Herbert Hoover/ Charles Curtis (R) ✗
1934	Gifford Pinchot (R)	Edward C. Shannon (R)	Frank E. Baldwin (R)	Charles A. Waters (R)	43R, 7D	140R, 65D, 2I, 1Soc	David A. Reed (R)	James J. Davis (R)	22R, 12D	Herbert Hoover/ Charles Curtis (R) ✗
1935	George Howard Earle III (D)	Thomas Kennedy (D)	Frank E. Baldwin (R)	Charles A. Waters (R)	31R, 19D	117D, 89R, 2Soc	Joseph F. Guffey (D)	James J. Davis (R)	23D, 11R	Herbert Hoover/ Charles Curtis (R) ✗
1936	George Howard Earle III (D)	Thomas Kennedy (D)	Frank E. Baldwin (R)	Charles A. Waters (R)	31R, 19D	117D, 89R, 2Soc	Joseph F. Guffey (D)	James J. Davis (R)	23D, 11R	Franklin D. Roosevelt/ John Nance Garner (D) ✓
1937	George Howard Earle III (D)	Thomas Kennedy (D)	Warren R. Roberts (D)	F. Clair Ross (D)	34D, 16R	154D, 54R	Joseph F. Guffey (D)	James J. Davis (R)	27D, 7R	Franklin D. Roosevelt/ John Nance Garner (D) ✓
1938	George Howard Earle III (D)	Thomas Kennedy (D)	Warren R. Roberts (D)	F. Clair Ross (D)	34D, 16R	154D, 54R	Joseph F. Guffey (D)	James J. Davis (R)	27D, 7R	Franklin D. Roosevelt/ John Nance Garner (D) ✓
1939	Arthur James (R)	Samuel S. Lewis (R)	Warren R. Roberts (D)	F. Clair Ross (D)	27R, 23D	129R, 79D	Joseph F. Guffey (D)	James J. Davis (R)	19R, 15D	Franklin D. Roosevelt/ John Nance Garner (D) ✓
1940	Arthur James (R)	Samuel S. Lewis (R)	Warren R. Roberts (D)	F. Clair Ross (D)	27R, 23D	129R, 79D	Joseph F. Guffey (D)	James J. Davis (R)	19R, 15D	Franklin D. Roosevelt/ Henry A. Wallace (D) ✓
1941	Arthur James (R)	Samuel S. Lewis (R)	F. Clair Ross (D)	G. Harold Wagner (D)	32R, 18D	126D, 82R	Joseph F. Guffey (D)	James J. Davis (R)	19D, 15R	Franklin D. Roosevelt/ Henry A. Wallace (D) ✓
1942	Arthur James (R)	Samuel S. Lewis (R)	F. Clair Ross (D)	G. Harold Wagner (D)	32R, 18D	126D, 82R	Joseph F. Guffey (D)	James J. Davis (R)	19D, 15R	Franklin D. Roosevelt/ Henry A. Wallace (D) ✓
1943	Edward Martin (R)	John C. Bell Jr. (R)	F. Clair Ross (D)	G. Harold Wagner (D)	32R, 18D	132R, 76D	Joseph F. Guffey (D)	James J. Davis (R)	20R, 13D	Franklin D. Roosevelt/ Henry A. Wallace (D) ✓
1944	Edward Martin (R)	John C. Bell Jr. (R)	F. Clair Ross (D)	G. Harold Wagner (D)	32R, 18D	132R, 76D	Joseph F. Guffey (D)	James J. Davis (R)	21R, 12D	Franklin D. Roosevelt/ Harry S. Truman ✓
1945	Edward Martin (R)	John C. Bell Jr. (R)	Ted A. Rosenberg	Ramsey S. Black (D)	32R, 18D	109R, 99D	Joseph F. Guffey (D)	Francis J. Myers (D)	18R, 15D	Franklin D. Roosevelt/ Harry S. Truman ✓
1945	Edward Martin (R)	John C. Bell Jr. (R)	G. Harold Wagner (D)	Ramsey S. Black (D)	32R, 18D	109R, 99D	Joseph F. Guffey (D)	Francis J. Myers (D)	18R, 15D	Franklin D. Roosevelt/ Harry S. Truman ✓
1946	Edward Martin (R)	John C. Bell Jr. (R)	G. Harold Wagner (D)	Ramsey S. Black (D)	32R, 18D	109R, 99D	Joseph F. Guffey (D)	Francis J. Myers (D)	19R, 14D	Franklin D. Roosevelt/ Harry S. Truman ✓
1947	John C. Bell Jr. (R)	vacant	G. Harold Wagner (D)	Ramsey S. Black (D)	34R, 16D	170R, 38D	Edward Martin (R)	Francis J. Myers (D)	28R, 5D	Franklin D. Roosevelt/ Harry S. Truman ✓
1947	James H. Duff (R)	Daniel Strickler (R)	G. Harold Wagner (D)	Ramsey S. Black (D)	34R, 16D	170R, 38D	Edward Martin (R)	Francis J. Myers (D)	28R, 5D	Franklin D. Roosevelt/ Harry S. Truman ✓
1948	James H. Duff (R)	Daniel Strickler (R)	G. Harold Wagner (D)	Ramsey S. Black (D)	34R, 16D	170R, 38D	Edward Martin (R)	Francis J. Myers (D)	28R, 5D	Thomas E. Dewey/ Earl Warren (R) ✗
1949	James H. Duff (R)	Daniel Strickler (R)	Weldon Brinton Heyburn (R)	Charles R. Barber (R)	35R, 15D	117R, 91D	Edward Martin (R)	Francis J. Myers (D)	17R, 16D	Thomas E. Dewey/ Earl Warren (R) ✗
1950	James H. Duff (R)	Daniel Strickler (R)	Weldon Brinton Heyburn (R)	Charles R. Barber (R)	35R, 15D	117R, 91D	Edward Martin (R)	Francis J. Myers (D)	17R, 16D	Thomas E. Dewey/ Earl Warren (R) ✗
1951	John S. Fine (R)	Lloyd H. Wood (R)	Weldon Brinton Heyburn (R)	Charles R. Barber (R)	30R, 20D	120R, 88D	Edward Martin (R)	James H. Duff (R)	20R, 13D	Thomas E. Dewey/ Earl Warren (R) ✗
1952	John S. Fine (R)	Lloyd H. Wood (R)	Weldon Brinton Heyburn (R)	Charles R. Barber (R)	30R, 20D	120R, 88D	Edward Martin (R)	James H. Duff (R)	20R, 13D	Dwight D. Eisenhower/ Richard Nixon (R) ✓
1953	John S. Fine (R)	Lloyd H. Wood (R)	Charles R. Barber (R)	Weldon Brinton Heyburn (R)	32R, 18D	110R, 98D	Edward Martin (R)	James H. Duff (R)	19R, 11D	Dwight D. Eisenhower/ Richard Nixon (R) ✓
1954	John S. Fine (R)	Lloyd H. Wood (R)	Charles R. Barber (R)	Weldon Brinton Heyburn (R)	32R, 18D	110R, 98D	Edward Martin (R)	James H. Duff (R)	19R, 11D	Dwight D. Eisenhower/ Richard Nixon (R) ✓
1955	George M. Leader (D)	Roy E. Furman (D)	Charles R. Barber (R)	Weldon Brinton Heyburn (R)	26R, 24D	112D, 98R	Edward Martin (R)	James H. Duff (R)	16R, 14D	Dwight D. Eisenhower/ Richard Nixon (R) ✓
1956	George M. Leader (D)	Roy E. Furman (D)	Charles R. Barber (R)	Weldon Brinton Heyburn (R)	26R, 24D	112D, 98R	Edward Martin (R)	James H. Duff (R)	16R, 14D	Dwight D. Eisenhower/ Richard Nixon (R) ✓
1957	George M. Leader (D)	Roy E. Furman (D)	Charles C. Smith (R)	Robert F. Kent (R)	27R, 23D	126R, 84D	Edward Martin (R)	Joseph S. Clark Jr. (D)	17R, 13D	Dwight D. Eisenhower/ Richard Nixon (R) ✓
1958	George M. Leader (D)	Roy E. Furman (D)	Charles C. Smith (R)	Robert F. Kent (R)	27R, 23D	126R, 84D	Edward Martin (R)	Joseph S. Clark Jr. (D)	17R, 13D	Dwight D. Eisenhower/ Richard Nixon (R) ✓
1959	David L. Lawrence (D)	John Morgan Davis (D)	Charles C. Smith (R)	Robert F. Kent (R)	28R, 22D	108D, 102R	Hugh Scott (R)	Joseph S. Clark Jr. (D)	16D, 14R	Dwight D. Eisenhower/ Richard Nixon (R) ✓
1960	David L. Lawrence (D)	John Morgan Davis (D)	Charles C. Smith (R)	Robert F. Kent (R)	28R, 22D	108D, 102R	Hugh Scott (R)	Joseph S. Clark Jr. (D)	16D, 14R	John F. Kennedy/ Lyndon B. Johnson (D) ✓
1961	David L. Lawrence (D)	John Morgan Davis (D)	Thomas Z. Minehart (D)	Grace M. Sloan (D)	25D, 25R (Note: Due to the Democratic Lt. Governor casting the deciding vote, the Democrats took control of the chamber.)	109D, 101R	Hugh Scott (R)	Joseph S. Clark Jr. (D)	16R, 14D	John F. Kennedy/ Lyndon B. Johnson (D) ✓
1962	David L. Lawrence (D)	John Morgan Davis (D)	Thomas Z. Minehart (D)	Grace M. Sloan (D)	25D, 25R	109D, 101R	Hugh Scott (R)	Joseph S. Clark Jr. (D)	16R, 14D	John F. Kennedy/ Lyndon B. Johnson (D) ✓
1963	William Scranton (R)	Raymond P. Shafer (R)	Thomas Z. Minehart (D)	Grace M. Sloan (D)	27R, 23D	108R, 102D	Hugh Scott (R)	Joseph S. Clark Jr. (D)	14R, 13D	John F. Kennedy/ Lyndon B. Johnson (D) ✓
1964	William Scranton (R)	Raymond P. Shafer (R)	Thomas Z. Minehart (D)	Grace M. Sloan (D)	27R, 23D	108R, 102D	Hugh Scott (R)	Joseph S. Clark Jr. (D)	14R, 13D	Lyndon B. Johnson/ Hubert Humphrey (D) ✓
1965	William Scranton (R)	Raymond P. Shafer (R)	Grace M. Sloan (D)	Thomas Z. Minehart (D)	28R, 22D	116D, 93R	Hugh Scott (R)	Joseph S. Clark Jr. (D)	15D, 12R	Lyndon B. Johnson/ Hubert Humphrey (D) ✓
1966	William Scranton (R)	Raymond P. Shafer (R)	Grace M. Sloan (D)	Thomas Z. Minehart (D)	28R, 22D	116D, 93R	Hugh Scott (R)	Joseph S. Clark Jr. (D)	15D, 12R	Lyndon B. Johnson/ Hubert Humphrey (D) ✓
1967	Raymond P. Shafer (R)	Raymond J. Broderick (R)	Grace M. Sloan (D)	Thomas Z. Minehart (D)	27R, 23D	104R, 99D	Hugh Scott (R)	Joseph S. Clark Jr. (D)	14D, 13R	Lyndon B. Johnson/ Hubert Humphrey (D) ✓
1968	Raymond P. Shafer (R)	Raymond J. Broderick (R)	Grace M. Sloan (D)	Thomas Z. Minehart (D)	27R, 23D	104R, 99D	Hugh Scott (R)	Joseph S. Clark Jr. (D)	14D, 13R	Hubert Humphrey/ Edmund Muskie (D) ✗
1969	Raymond P. Shafer (R)	Raymond J. Broderick (R)	Bob Casey Sr. (D)	Grace M. Sloan (D)	27R, 23D	107D, 96R	Hugh Scott (R)	Richard Schweiker (R)	14D, 13R	Hubert Humphrey/ Edmund Muskie (D) ✗
1970	Raymond P. Shafer (R)	Raymond J. Broderick (R)	Bob Casey Sr. (D)	Grace M. Sloan (D)	27R, 23D	107D, 96R	Hugh Scott (R)	Richard Schweiker (R)	14D, 13R	Hubert Humphrey/ Edmund Muskie (D) ✗
1971	Milton Shapp (D)	Ernest Kline (D)	Bob Casey Sr. (D)	Grace M. Sloan (D)	26D, 24R	113D, 90R	Hugh Scott (R)	Richard Schweiker (R)	14D, 13R	Hubert Humphrey/ Edmund Muskie (D) ✗
1972	Milton Shapp (D)	Ernest Kline (D)	Bob Casey Sr. (D)	Grace M. Sloan (D)	26D, 24R	113D, 90R	Hugh Scott (R)	Richard Schweiker (R)	14D, 13R	Richard Nixon/ Spiro Agnew (R) ✓
1973	Milton Shapp (D)	Ernest Kline (D)	Bob Casey Sr. (D)	Grace M. Sloan (D)	26D, 24R	107R, 96D	Hugh Scott (R)	Richard Schweiker (R)	13D, 12R	Richard Nixon/ Spiro Agnew (R) ✓
1974	Milton Shapp (D)	Ernest Kline (D)	Bob Casey Sr. (D)	Grace M. Sloan (D)	26D, 24R	107R, 96D	Hugh Scott (R)	Richard Schweiker (R)	13D, 12R	Richard Nixon/ Spiro Agnew (R) ✓
1975	Milton Shapp (D)	Ernest Kline (D)	Bob Casey Sr. (D)	Grace M. Sloan (D)	30D, 20R	113D, 90R	Hugh Scott (R)	Richard Schweiker (R)	14D, 11R	Richard Nixon/ Spiro Agnew (R) ✓
1976	Milton Shapp (D)	Ernest Kline (D)	Bob Casey Sr. (D)	Grace M. Sloan (D)	30D, 20R	113D, 90R	Hugh Scott (R)	Richard Schweiker (R)	14D, 11R	Jimmy Carter/ Walter Mondale (D) ✓
1977	Milton Shapp (D)	Ernest Kline (D)	Al Benedict (D)	Robert E. Casey (D)	31D, 19R	118D, 85R	John Heinz (R)	Richard Schweiker (R)	17D, 8R	Jimmy Carter/ Walter Mondale (D) ✓
1978	Milton Shapp (D)	Ernest Kline (D)	Al Benedict (D)	Robert E. Casey (D)	31D, 19R	118D, 85R	John Heinz (R)	Richard Schweiker (R)	17D, 8R	Jimmy Carter/ Walter Mondale (D) ✓

=== 1978–present ===
Year	Executive offices					State Legislature		United States Congress			Electoral votes
Year	Governor	Lieutenant Governor	Attorney General	Auditor General	Treasurer	Senate	House	Senator (Class I)	Senator (Class III)	House	Electoral votes
1979	Dick Thornburgh (R)	William Scranton III (R)	not an elected office	Al Benedict (D)	Robert E. Casey (D)	28D, 22R	102R, 101D	John Heinz (R)	Richard Schweiker (R)	15D, 10R	
1980	Dick Thornburgh (R)	William Scranton III (R)	not an elected office	Al Benedict (D)	Robert E. Casey (D)	28D, 22R	102R, 101D	John Heinz (R)	Richard Schweiker (R)	15D, 10R	Ronald Reagan/ George H. W. Bush (R) ✓
1981	Dick Thornburgh (R)	William Scranton III (R)	LeRoy Zimmerman (R)	Al Benedict (D)	R. Budd Dwyer (R)	26R, 24D	103R, 100D	John Heinz (R)	Arlen Specter (R)	13D, 12R	Ronald Reagan/ George H. W. Bush (R) ✓
1982	Dick Thornburgh (R)	William Scranton III (R)	LeRoy Zimmerman (R)	Al Benedict (D)	R. Budd Dwyer (R)	26R, 24D	103R, 100D	John Heinz (R)	Arlen Specter (R)	13D, 12R	Ronald Reagan/ George H. W. Bush (R) ✓
1983	Dick Thornburgh (R)	William Scranton III (R)	LeRoy Zimmerman (R)	Al Benedict (D)	R. Budd Dwyer (R)	27R, 23D	103D, 100R	John Heinz (R)	Arlen Specter (R)	13D, 10R	Ronald Reagan/ George H. W. Bush (R) ✓
1984	Dick Thornburgh (R)	William Scranton III (R)	LeRoy Zimmerman (R)	Al Benedict (D)	R. Budd Dwyer (R)	27R, 23D	103D, 100R	John Heinz (R)	Arlen Specter (R)	13D, 10R	Ronald Reagan/ George H. W. Bush (R) ✓
1985	Dick Thornburgh (R)	William Scranton III (R)	LeRoy Zimmerman (R)	Donald A. Bailey (D)	R. Budd Dwyer (R)	27R, 23D	103D, 100R	John Heinz (R)	Arlen Specter (R)	13D, 10R	Ronald Reagan/ George H. W. Bush (R) ✓
1986	Dick Thornburgh (R)	William Scranton III (R)	LeRoy Zimmerman (R)	Donald A. Bailey (D)	R. Budd Dwyer (R)	27R, 23D	103D, 100R	John Heinz (R)	Arlen Specter (R)	13D, 10R	Ronald Reagan/ George H. W. Bush (R) ✓
1987	Bob Casey Sr. (D)	Mark Singel (D)	LeRoy Zimmerman (R)	Donald A. Bailey (D)	G. Davis Greene Jr. (D) (Note: Appointed to fill a vacancy.)	26R, 24D	102D, 101R	John Heinz (R)	Arlen Specter (R)	12D, 11R	Ronald Reagan/ George H. W. Bush (R) ✓
1988	Bob Casey Sr. (D)	Mark Singel (D)	LeRoy Zimmerman (R)	Donald A. Bailey (D)	G. Davis Greene Jr. (D)	26R, 24D	102D, 101R	John Heinz (R)	Arlen Specter (R)	12D, 11R	George H. W. Bush/ Dan Quayle (R) ✓
1989	Bob Casey Sr. (D)	Mark Singel (D)	Ernie Preate (R) (Note: Resigned.)	Barbara Hafer (R)	Catherine Baker Knoll (D)	27R, 23D	104D, 99R	John Heinz (R)	Arlen Specter (R)	12D, 11R	George H. W. Bush/ Dan Quayle (R) ✓
1990	Bob Casey Sr. (D)	Mark Singel (D)	Ernie Preate (R)	Barbara Hafer (R)	Catherine Baker Knoll (D)	27R, 23D	104D, 99R	John Heinz (R)	Arlen Specter (R)	12D, 11R	George H. W. Bush/ Dan Quayle (R) ✓
1991	Bob Casey Sr. (D)	Mark Singel (D)	Ernie Preate (R)	Barbara Hafer (R)	Catherine Baker Knoll (D)	26R, 24D	107D, 96R	John Heinz (R)	Arlen Specter (R)	12R, 11D	George H. W. Bush/ Dan Quayle (R) ✓
1991	Bob Casey Sr. (D)	Mark Singel (D)	Ernie Preate (R)	Barbara Hafer (R)	Catherine Baker Knoll (D)	26R, 24D	107D, 96R	Harris Wofford (D) (Note: Appointed by Governor Casey in May 1991 after Heinz's death and won a special election in November 1991 for the remainder of the term.)	Arlen Specter (R)	12R, 11D	George H. W. Bush/ Dan Quayle (R) ✓
1992	Bob Casey Sr. (D)	Mark Singel (D)	Ernie Preate (R)	Barbara Hafer (R)	Catherine Baker Knoll (D)	26R, 24D	107D, 96R	Harris Wofford (D)	Arlen Specter (R)	12R, 11D	Bill Clinton/ Al Gore (D) ✓
1993	Bob Casey Sr. (D)	Mark Singel (D)	Ernie Preate (R)	Barbara Hafer (R)	Catherine Baker Knoll (D)	25D, 25R (Note: Sen. Frank Pecora switched parties from Republican to Democratic, but in the case of ties, the Lt. Governor casts the deciding vote, and as a Democrat, he gave his party control.)	105D, 98R	Harris Wofford (D)	Arlen Specter (R)	11D, 10R	Bill Clinton/ Al Gore (D) ✓
1994	Bob Casey Sr. (D)	Mark Singel (D)	Ernie Preate (R)	Barbara Hafer (R)	Catherine Baker Knoll (D)	26R, 24D (Note: After months of turmoil, a special election result was thrown out that had been won by Democrat William G. Stinson, who had succeeded fellow Democrat Francis Lynch. A federal judge awarded the election to Republican Bruce Marks. Additionally, Democrat Eugene Scanlon's death in March 1994 gave Republicans control.)	105D, 98R	Harris Wofford (D)	Arlen Specter (R)	11D, 10R	Bill Clinton/ Al Gore (D) ✓
1995	Tom Ridge (R)	Mark Schweiker (R)	Ernie Preate (R)	Barbara Hafer (R)	Catherine Baker Knoll (D)	29R, 21D	102R, 101D	Rick Santorum (R)	Arlen Specter (R)	11D, 10R	Bill Clinton/ Al Gore (D) ✓
1995	Tom Ridge (R)	Mark Schweiker (R)	Tom Corbett (R)	Barbara Hafer (R)	Catherine Baker Knoll (D)	29R, 21D	102R, 101D	Rick Santorum (R)	Arlen Specter (R)	11D, 10R	Bill Clinton/ Al Gore (D) ✓
1996	Tom Ridge (R)	Mark Schweiker (R)	Tom Corbett (R)	Barbara Hafer (R)	Catherine Baker Knoll (D)	29R, 21D	102R, 101D	Rick Santorum (R)	Arlen Specter (R)	11D, 10R	Bill Clinton/ Al Gore (D) ✓
1997	Tom Ridge (R)	Mark Schweiker (R)	D. Michael Fisher (R)	Bob Casey Jr. (D)	Barbara Hafer (R)	30R, 20D	104R, 99D	Rick Santorum (R)	Arlen Specter (R)	11D, 10R	Bill Clinton/ Al Gore (D) ✓
1998	Tom Ridge (R)	Mark Schweiker (R)	D. Michael Fisher (R)	Bob Casey Jr. (D)	Barbara Hafer (R)	30R, 20D	104R, 99D	Rick Santorum (R)	Arlen Specter (R)	11D, 10R	Bill Clinton/ Al Gore (D) ✓
1999	Tom Ridge (R)	Mark Schweiker (R)	D. Michael Fisher (R)	Bob Casey Jr. (D)	Barbara Hafer (R)	30R, 20D	103R, 100D	Rick Santorum (R)	Arlen Specter (R)	11D, 10R	Bill Clinton/ Al Gore (D) ✓
2000	Tom Ridge (R)	Mark Schweiker (R)	D. Michael Fisher (R)	Bob Casey Jr. (D)	Barbara Hafer (R)	30R, 20D	103R, 100D	Rick Santorum (R)	Arlen Specter (R)	11D, 10R	Al Gore/ Joe Lieberman (D) ✗
2001	Tom Ridge (R)	Mark Schweiker (R)	D. Michael Fisher (R)	Bob Casey Jr. (D)	Barbara Hafer (R)	30R, 20D	104R, 99D	Rick Santorum (R)	Arlen Specter (R)	11R, 10D	Al Gore/ Joe Lieberman (D) ✗
2001	Mark Schweiker (R) (Note: As lieutenant governor, filled vacancy in office of governor.)	Robert Jubelirer (R) (Note: As president pro tempore of the state Senate, filled vacancy in office of lieutenant governor.)	D. Michael Fisher (R)	Bob Casey Jr. (D)	Barbara Hafer (R)	30R, 20D	104R, 99D	Rick Santorum (R)	Arlen Specter (R)	11R, 10D	Al Gore/ Joe Lieberman (D) ✗
2002	Mark Schweiker (R)	Robert Jubelirer (R)	D. Michael Fisher (R)	Bob Casey Jr. (D)	Barbara Hafer (R)	30R, 20D	104R, 99D	Rick Santorum (R)	Arlen Specter (R)	11R, 10D	Al Gore/ Joe Lieberman (D) ✗
2003	Ed Rendell (D)	Catherine Baker Knoll (D)	D. Michael Fisher (R)	Bob Casey Jr. (D)	Barbara Hafer (D)	29R, 21D	110R, 93D	Rick Santorum (R)	Arlen Specter (R)	12R, 7D	Al Gore/ Joe Lieberman (D) ✗
2004	Ed Rendell (D)	Catherine Baker Knoll (D)	D. Michael Fisher (R)	Bob Casey Jr. (D)	Barbara Hafer (D)	29R, 21D	110R, 93D	Rick Santorum (R)	Arlen Specter (R)	12R, 7D	John Kerry/ John Edwards (D) ✗
2004	Ed Rendell (D)	Catherine Baker Knoll (D)	Jerry Pappert (R)	Bob Casey Jr. (D)	Barbara Hafer (D)	29R, 21D	110R, 93D	Rick Santorum (R)	Arlen Specter (R)	12R, 7D	John Kerry/ John Edwards (D) ✗
2005	Ed Rendell (D)	Catherine Baker Knoll (D)	Tom Corbett (R)	Jack Wagner (D)	Bob Casey Jr. (D) (Note: Resigned following election to U.S. Senate.)	30R, 20D	110R, 93D	Rick Santorum (R)	Arlen Specter (R)	12R, 7D	John Kerry/ John Edwards (D) ✗
2006	Ed Rendell (D)	Catherine Baker Knoll (D)	Tom Corbett (R)	Jack Wagner (D)	Bob Casey Jr. (D)	30R, 20D	110R, 93D	Rick Santorum (R)	Arlen Specter (R)	12R, 7D	John Kerry/ John Edwards (D) ✗
2007	Ed Rendell (D)	Catherine Baker Knoll (D)	Tom Corbett (R)	Jack Wagner (D)	Robin Wiessmann (D)	29R, 21D	102D, 101R (Note: Elected a Republican Speaker.)	Bob Casey Jr. (D)	Arlen Specter (R)	11D, 8R	John Kerry/ John Edwards (D) ✗
2008	Ed Rendell (D)	Catherine Baker Knoll (D)	Tom Corbett (R)	Jack Wagner (D)	Robin Wiessmann (D)	29R, 21D	102D, 101R	Bob Casey Jr. (D)	Arlen Specter (R)	11D, 8R	Barack Obama/ Joe Biden (D) ✓
2008	Ed Rendell (D)	Joe Scarnati (R)	Tom Corbett (R)	Jack Wagner (D)	Robin Wiessmann (D)	29R, 21D	102D, 101R	Bob Casey Jr. (D)	Arlen Specter (R)	11D, 8R	Barack Obama/ Joe Biden (D) ✓
2009	Ed Rendell (D)	Joe Scarnati (R)	Tom Corbett (R)	Jack Wagner (D)	Rob McCord (D)	30R, 20D	104D, 99R	Bob Casey Jr. (D)	Arlen Specter (R)	12D, 7R	Barack Obama/ Joe Biden (D) ✓
2009	Ed Rendell (D)	Joe Scarnati (R)	Tom Corbett (R)	Jack Wagner (D)	Rob McCord (D)	30R, 20D	104D, 99R	Bob Casey Jr. (D)	Arlen Specter (D)	12D, 7R	Barack Obama/ Joe Biden (D) ✓
2010	Ed Rendell (D)	Joe Scarnati (R)	Tom Corbett (R)	Jack Wagner (D)	Rob McCord (D)	30R, 20D	104D, 99R	Bob Casey Jr. (D)	Arlen Specter (D)	12D, 7R	Barack Obama/ Joe Biden (D) ✓
2011	Tom Corbett (R)	Jim Cawley (R)	Linda L. Kelly (R) (Note: William H. Ryan Jr. served as acting Attorney General from January (when Corbett was inaugurated as governor) until Kelly's nomination was confirmed by the State Senate.)	Jack Wagner (D)	Rob McCord (D)	30R, 20D	112R, 91D	Bob Casey Jr. (D)	Pat Toomey (R)	12R, 7D	Barack Obama/ Joe Biden (D) ✓
2012	Tom Corbett (R)	Jim Cawley (R)	Linda L. Kelly (R)	Jack Wagner (D)	Rob McCord (D)	30R, 20D	112R, 91D	Bob Casey Jr. (D)	Pat Toomey (R)	12R, 7D	Barack Obama/ Joe Biden (D) ✓
2013	Tom Corbett (R)	Jim Cawley (R)	Kathleen Kane (D)	Eugene DePasquale (D)	Rob McCord (D)	27R, 23D	111R, 92D	Bob Casey Jr. (D)	Pat Toomey (R)	13R, 5D	Barack Obama/ Joe Biden (D) ✓
2014	Tom Corbett (R)	Jim Cawley (R)	Kathleen Kane (D)	Eugene DePasquale (D)	Rob McCord (D)	27R, 23D	111R, 92D	Bob Casey Jr. (D)	Pat Toomey (R)	13R, 5D	Barack Obama/ Joe Biden (D) ✓
2015	Tom Wolf (D)	Mike Stack (D)	Kathleen Kane (D)	Eugene DePasquale (D)	Tim Reese (I)	30R, 20D	120R, 83D	Bob Casey Jr. (D)	Pat Toomey (R)	13R, 5D	Barack Obama/ Joe Biden (D) ✓
2016	Tom Wolf (D)	Mike Stack (D)	Kathleen Kane (D)	Eugene DePasquale (D)	Tim Reese (I)	31R, 19D	119R, 84D	Bob Casey Jr. (D)	Pat Toomey (R)	13R, 5D	Donald Trump/ Mike Pence (R) ✓
2016	Tom Wolf (D)	Mike Stack (D)	Bruce Beemer (D) (Note: Republican Deputy Attorney General Bruce Castor served for 13 days from August 17–30 between Kane's resignation and Beemer's assumption of the office.)	Eugene DePasquale (D)	Tim Reese (I)	31R, 19D	119R, 84D	Bob Casey Jr. (D)	Pat Toomey (R)	13R, 5D	Donald Trump/ Mike Pence (R) ✓
2017	Tom Wolf (D)	Mike Stack (D)	Josh Shapiro (D)	Eugene DePasquale (D)	Joe Torsella (D)	34R, 16D	121R, 82D	Bob Casey Jr. (D)	Pat Toomey (R)	13R, 5D	Donald Trump/ Mike Pence (R) ✓
2018	Tom Wolf (D)	Mike Stack (D)	Josh Shapiro (D)	Eugene DePasquale (D)	Joe Torsella (D)	34R, 16D	121R, 82D	Bob Casey Jr. (D)	Pat Toomey (R)	10R, 8D (Note: Democrat Conor Lamb won a special election to fill a vacancy for Pennsylvania's 18th Congressional District, left by Republican Timothy F. Murphy's resignation. Democrats Mary Gay Scanlon and Susan Wild won special elections to fill seats left vacant by Republicans Pat Meehan/ Charlie Dent respectively.)	Donald Trump/ Mike Pence (R) ✓
2019	Tom Wolf (D)	John Fetterman (D)	Josh Shapiro (D)	Eugene DePasquale (D)	Joe Torsella (D)	28R, 22D (Note: Republican Don C. White resigned in February 2019 and Republican Joe Pittman was elected in May 2019 to succeed him. Also, Republican Mike Folmer resigned in September 2019 and Republican Dave Arnold was elected to succeed him in a January 2020 special election.)	110R, 93D	Bob Casey Jr. (D)	Pat Toomey (R)	9R, 9D	Donald Trump/ Mike Pence (R) ✓
2020	Tom Wolf (D)	John Fetterman (D)	Josh Shapiro (D)	Eugene DePasquale (D)	Joe Torsella (D)	28R, 21D, 1I (Note: John Yudichak (District 14) switched parties from Democratic to Independent in November 2019 and began caucusing with the Republican majority.)	110R, 93D	Bob Casey Jr. (D)	Pat Toomey (R)	9R, 9D	Joe Biden/ Kamala Harris (D) ✓
2021	Tom Wolf (D)	John Fetterman (D)	Josh Shapiro (D)	Timothy DeFoor (R)	Stacy Garrity (R)	28R, 21D, 1I	113R, 90D	Bob Casey Jr. (D)	Pat Toomey (R)	9R, 9D	Joe Biden/ Kamala Harris (D) ✓
2022	Tom Wolf (D)	John Fetterman (D)	Josh Shapiro (D)	Timothy DeFoor (R)	Stacy Garrity (R)	28R, 21D, 1I	113R, 90D	Bob Casey Jr. (D)	Pat Toomey (R)	9R, 9D	Joe Biden/ Kamala Harris (D) ✓
2023	Josh Shapiro (D)	Austin Davis (D)	Michelle Henry (D)	Timothy DeFoor (R)	Stacy Garrity (R)	28R, 22D	102D, 101R	Bob Casey Jr. (D)	John Fetterman (D)	9D, 8R	Joe Biden/ Kamala Harris (D) ✓
2024	Josh Shapiro (D)	Austin Davis (D)	Michelle Henry (D)	Timothy DeFoor (R)	Stacy Garrity (R)	28R, 22D	102D, 101R	Bob Casey Jr. (D)	John Fetterman (D)	9D, 8R	Donald Trump/ JD Vance (R) ✓
2025	Josh Shapiro (D)	Austin Davis (D)	Dave Sunday (R)	Timothy DeFoor (R)	Stacy Garrity (R)	27R, 23D (Note: Ryan Aument (District 36) resigned December 31, 2024 to become State Director to U.S. Senator Dave McCormick. James Andrew Malone was elected in a special election on March 25, 2025, flipping the seat to Democrats.)	102D, 101R	Dave McCormick (R)	John Fetterman (D)	10R, 7D	Donald Trump/ JD Vance (R) ✓
2026	Josh Shapiro (D)	Austin Davis (D)	Dave Sunday (R)	Timothy DeFoor (R)	Stacy Garrity (R)	27R, 23D	103D, 100R (Note: Stephenie Scialabba (District 12) resigned March 31, 2026. Brandon Dukes was elected in a special election on August 18, 2026, flipping the seat to Democrats.)	Dave McCormick (R)	John Fetterman (D)	10R, 7D	Donald Trump/ JD Vance (R) ✓
2027	Josh Shapiro (D)	Austin Davis (D)	Dave Sunday (R)	Timothy DeFoor (R)	Stacy Garrity (R)	26D, 24R	114D, 89R	Dave McCormick (R)	John Fetterman (D)	11D, 6R	Donald Trump/ JD Vance (R) ✓

Key to party colors and abbreviations for members of the U.S. Congress and other politicians or officials
Alaskan Independence (AKIP) Know Nothing (KN) American Labor (AL) Anti-Jacksonian (Anti-J); National Republican (NR) Anti-Administration (AA) Anti-Masonic (Anti-M) Conservative (Con) Covenant (Cov)	Democratic (D) Democratic–Farmer–Labor (DFL) Democratic–NPL (D-NPL) Dixiecrat (Dix), States' Rights (SR) Democratic-Republican (DR) Farmer–Labor (FL) Federalist (F); Pro-Administration (PA)	Free Soil (FS) Fusion (Fus) Greenback (GB) Independence (IPM) Jacksonian (J) Liberal (Lib) Libertarian (L) National Union (NU)	Nonpartisan League (NPL) Nullifier (N) Opposition Northern (O); Opposition Southern (O) Populist (Pop) Progressive (Prog) Prohibition (Proh) Readjuster (Rea)	Republican (R) Silver (Sv) Silver Republican (SvR) Socialist (Soc) Union (U) Unconditional Union (UU) Vermont Progressive (VP) Whig (W)	Independent (I) Nonpartisan (NP)

== See also ==
- Democratic Party of Pennsylvania
- Elections in Pennsylvania
- Green Party of Pennsylvania
- Libertarian Party of Pennsylvania
- Politics of Pennsylvania
- Republican Party of Pennsylvania
