= Esther de Berdt Reed =

First Lady of Pennsylvania (1746–1780)

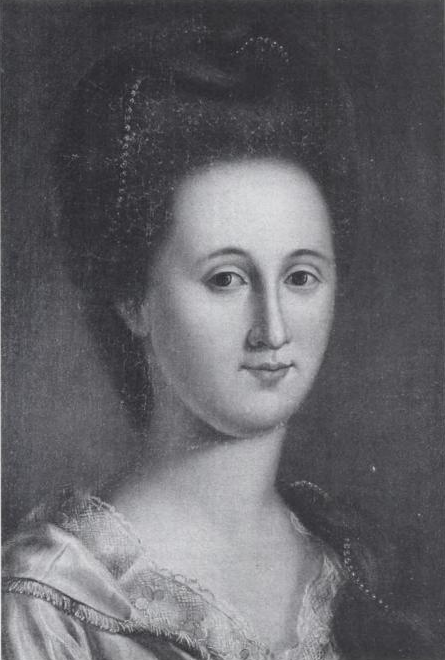

First Lady of Pennsylvania
- In role December 1, 1778 – September 18, 1780
- Governor: Joseph Reed
- Preceded by: Elizabeth Smith Bryan
- Succeeded by: Sarah Lloyd Moore

Personal details
- Born: October , 1746 London, England
- Died: September 18, 1780 (aged 33) Philadelphia, Pennsylvania, U.S.
- Resting place: Laurel Hill Cemetery, Philadelphia, Pennsylvania, U.S.
- Spouse: Joseph Reed (m. 1770)
- Children: 6; five lived to adulthood.

Esther de Berdt Reed (October 22, 1746 – September 18, 1780) served as first lady of Pennsylvania during her husband Joseph Reed's term as president of the Supreme Executive Council of the Commonwealth of Pennsylvania, a role analogous to Governor of Pennsylvania, from 1778 to 1780. She was active in the American Revolutionary War as a civic leader for soldiers' relief. She published Sentiments of an American Woman which called for financial sacrifice and an increased role of women in public service. Along with Sarah Franklin Bache, the daughter of Benjamin Franklin, she co-founded the Ladies Association of Philadelphia which raised money to provide resources for George Washington's troops during the war. She was recognized as a member of the Daughters of Liberty post-mortem for her efforts in support of the American Revolution.

== Life in England ==
Esther de Berdt was born in London, England in October 1746, to Dennys and Martha (Simon) de Berdt. The de Berdts immigrated to Britain in the 16th century. The family descended from Protestant refugees from Ypres, Belgium and were involved in trade with America. Not a lot is known about her childhood, but according to some of her personal letters, she suffered from poor health. She met Joseph Reed, a law student from New Jersey in London in 1763. Esther and Joseph maintained a secret, long-distance relationship through letters for five years while he was back in New Jersey. They wed on 1770 after he returned to London.

== Early life in America ==
Esther, Joseph, and her widowed mother then moved to Philadelphia, Pennsylvania. Esther attended to her husband's legal practice by helping him with correspondence and keeping business records. The Reeds had a successful life in Philadelphia from 1770-1775.

Joseph Reed became a prosperous lawyer and served as a member of the Continental Congress from 1777 to 1778. The couple fled Philadelphia to evade approaching British forces. They had six children together, five of which survived to adulthood. Esther cared for the children while Joseph served as aide-de-camp for George Washington.

== Political involvement ==
Esther became first lady of Pennsylvania after Joseph successfully campaigned for the position of president of the Supreme Executive Council of Pennsylvania in 1778.

Esther organized a fundraiser with the Ladies Association of Philadelphia in 1780. On June 12, 1780, Reed published Sentiments of an American Woman, which called for financial sacrifice and an increased role for women in public service. Women throughout the 13 American colonies raised over $300,000 for the Continental Army. Esther's husband wrote to General George Washington on June 20, 1780 to tell him about the funds raised by the women's efforts. The letter expressed the Ladies' hope that the money would be used as the Continental Army desired.

In his response letter four days later, Washington suggested that the women use the funds to buy linen instead. Esther directly responded to this by writing that she and the ladies still hoped that the men would use the money on something else. They exchanged in correspondence in which Washington reiterated to Esther that the funds would be better suited towards clothing because some men would misuse it on things such as alcohol. Esther agreed to buy linen to make clothing for General Washington and his army by the end of summer. The volunteer seamstress sewed their names into the shirts to show their support for the troops. More than 2,000 shirts were delivered.

== Death and legacy ==
Esther de Berdt Reed died from dysentery shortly before her 34th birthday on September 18, 1780. Philadelphia experienced an outbreak of dysentery due to the arrival of the Pennsylvania militia, and Esther succumbed to the disease within a few days of falling ill. She was initially interred in the Second Presbyterian Church cemetery in Philadelphia. In 1868, both her and her husband's remains were reinterred to Laurel Hill Cemetery. Reed was recognized as a Daughter of Liberty after her death for her efforts in support of the American Revolution.

== Additional reading ==
- Ireland, O. S. (2017). Sentiments of a British-American Woman: Esther DeBerdt Reed and the American Revolution. Penn State Press.
- Reed, William Bradford. The Life of Esther De Berdt: Afterwards Esther Reed, of Pennsylvania. C. Sherman, printer, 1853.
- Roberts, Cokie. Founding Mothers: The Women who Raised our Nation, New York: Harper Collins, ISBN 0-06-009025-1, pp. 118–130
