= McLene =

McLene is a surname. Notable people with the surname include:

- James McLene (1730–1806), American farmer and politician
- Jeremiah McLene (1767–1837), American politician

== See also ==
- McLane
