= Joseph Reed (politician) =

American Founding Father, lawyer, military officer, and politician (1741–1785)

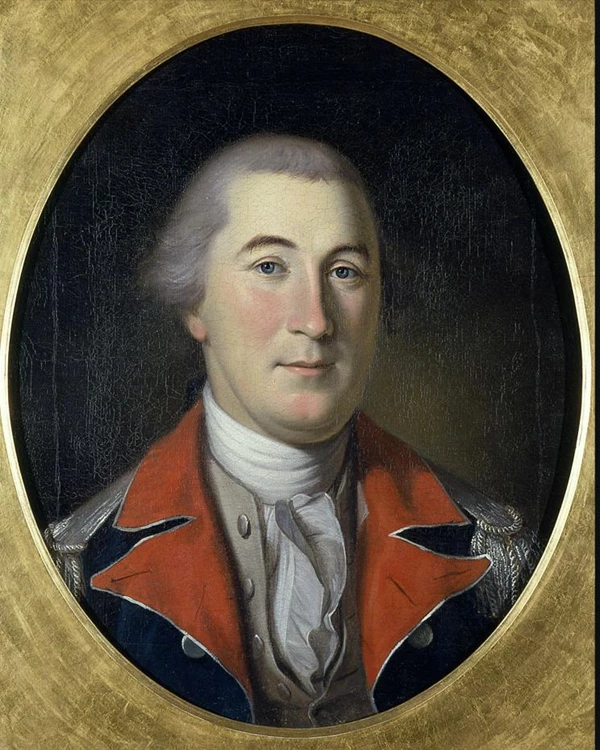
- Portrait by Charles Willson Peale, c. 1783

3rd President of Pennsylvania
- In office December 1, 1778 – November 16, 1781
- Vice President: George Bryan; Matthew Smith; William Moore
- Preceded by: George Bryan
- Succeeded by: William Moore

Member, Continental Congress
- In office 1778–1778

Personal details
- Born: August 27, 1741 Trenton, Province of New Jersey, British America
- Died: March 5, 1785 (aged 43) Philadelphia, Pennsylvania, U.S.
- Resting place: Laurel Hill Cemetery, Philadelphia, Pennsylvania, U.S.
- Spouse: Esther de Berdt (m. 1770; died 1780)
- Profession: Statesman, lawyer, military officer

Joseph Reed (August 27, 1741 – March 5, 1785) was an American lawyer, military officer, politician, and Founding Father of the United States. He served as aide-de-camp to George Washington, as adjutant general of the Continental Army and fought in several key battles during the American Revolutionary War. He is credited with designing the Pine Tree Flag used during the war.

He served as a delegate to the Continental Congress from Pennsylvania and was a signatory to the Articles of Confederation. He served as the third President of Pennsylvania's Supreme Executive Council, a position analogous to the modern office of Governor, from 1778 to 1781. He was elected to Congress a second time in 1784, but did not take office due to poor health.

== Early life and education ==
Reed was born in Trenton in the Province of New Jersey on August 7, 1741, to Andrew Reed and Theodosia Bowes. His grandfather, Joseph Reed, was a wealthy merchant born in Carrickfergus, County Antrim in Ulster, who settled in West Jersey. The family moved to Philadelphia shortly after Reed's birth and, as a boy, Reed was enrolled at Philadelphia Academy. He received his bachelor's degree from the College of New Jersey (later known as Princeton University) in 1757.

He studied law under Richard Stockton. In the summer of 1763, Reed sailed for England and studied law at Middle Temple in London for two years. Shortly after his studies ended in 1768, Reed was elected as a member of the American Philosophical Society.

== Business career ==
Upon his return from London, he established a law practice in Trenton, New Jersey, and was appointed deputy secretary of New Jersey and clerk of the council. He worked as an assistant to Dennys de Berdt, a former agent for his father and the colonial representative for New England. He was a successful land speculator.

== Military career ==
In 1775, after the Battles of Lexington and Concord, Reed was appointed lieutenant colonel in the Pennsylvania Militia. When his friend George Washington was assigned commander-in-chief of the Continental Army, Reed became his aide-de-camp.

Reed is credited with creating the Pine Tree Flag. On October 20, 1775, Reed wrote a letter to Colonel John Glover of the "Marblehead Men" Regiment of seamen in the Continental Army, setting the design of the First Navy Flag, the Evergreen Tree of Liberty flag. Reed wrote: "What do you think of a Flag with a white Ground, a tree in the middle, the motto: "Appeal to Heaven"."

Reed is credited with creating the Pine Tree Flag.

In June 1775, Reed served as Adjutant-General of the Continental Army with the rank of colonel and fought in the Battle of Long Island. In this service he became one of General Washington's closest confidants; Washington wrote letters to him frequently and rarely traveled or made any substantial military decision without first consulting Reed. Because of his knowledge of the terrain of New Jersey, Reed was instrumental in the planning of the Battle of Trenton, and his advice to Washington for rebel forces to be more direct heavily influenced the commander-in-chief's decisions. He fought in the Battle of Princeton and provided important intelligence in the Battle of Princeton back to Washington. He was involved in the second crossing of the Delaware, and fought in the Battle of Brandywine, the Battle of Germantown and the Battle of Monmouth.

In December 1776, anxious to know the location of General Charles Lee's forces following the Continental Army's chaotic retreat from Manhattan, Washington opened a letter from Lee to Reed which indicated that they were both having serious doubts about Washington's decision-making and abilities. This was extremely disconcerting to Washington, as Reed was one of his most trusted officers. Washington and Reed maintained a working relationship in the army together, although Reed never had the same level of trust from Washington from that point forward.

In 1782, Reed was accused of treasonous conduct during the war in an anonymous article published in a newspaper. Reed assumed the article was published by Colonel John Cadwalader, but others believe the author was Dr. Benjamin Rush. A pamphlet series was published in 1783 which defended Reed.

== Political career ==
He served on the Committee of Correspondence for Philadelphia in 1774, as president of Pennsylvania's second Provincial Congress in 1775 and as member of the Pennsylvania Assembly in 1776. He was offered the position of Chief Justice of the Supreme Court of Pennsylvania in 1777, but declined. In 1778, Reed was one of the signers of the Articles of Confederation.

On December 1, 1778, he was elected President of the Supreme Executive Council of Pennsylvania, a position analogous to the modern office of governor. Reed oversaw the gradual abolition of slavery in Pennsylvania and the awarding of Revolutionary soldiers with lifelong "half-pay". Reed carried on a public feud with Benedict Arnold, who was the military commander of Philadelphia at the time. He accused him of eight instances of corruption. Arnold demanded a military trial and successfully cleared his name, although his reputation was damaged. Arnold resigned his post in Philadelphia, and the charges led Arnold to later commit treason against the United States.

In 1778, Reed reported to Congress that Frederick Howard, 5th Earl of Carlisle, through the Carlisle Peace Commission, had attempted to bribe him to promote reconciliation of the colonies with Britain.

Reed's antipathy to Pennsylvania's Loyalist residents has been well attested by historic sources. Whilst in Congress, he advocated for the seizure of Loyalist properties and treason charges for those aligned with Great Britain (Reed and his family then lived in a confiscated Loyalist home). Congress regarded the Loyalist citizens in a more tolerant manner. As the President of Pennsylvania, Reed oversaw numerous trials of suspected Loyalists. He also played a key role in settling the Pennsylvania Line Mutiny in January 1781.

After leaving the office of president of the Supreme Council, he served as one of the lawyers who defended Pennsylvania's claim to the Wyoming Valley in a land dispute from the state of Connecticut.

He was elected to Congress a second time in 1784, but was unable to take office due to poor health.

== Personal life ==
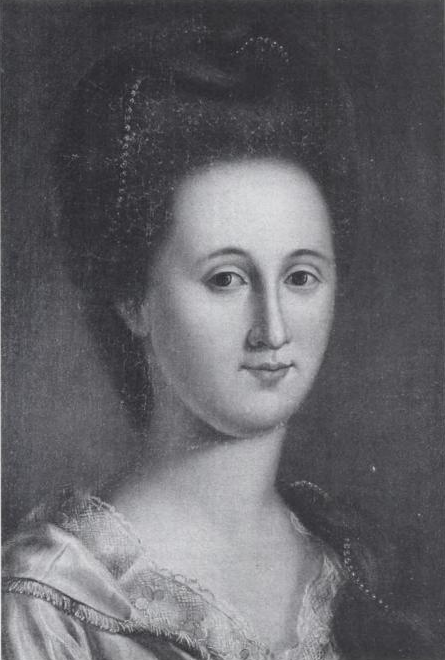
Reed met his wife, Esther de Berdt Reed, while studying law in London.

During his time studying in London, Reed became romantically attached to Esther de Berdt, the daughter of the agent for the Province of Massachusetts Bay, Dennys de Berdt. Though very fond of Reed, de Berdt was aware of Reed's intention to return to Philadelphia and initially refused consent for Esther to marry him. Reed returned to the Colonies with only a tenuous engagement to Esther, and with an understanding that he would return to settle permanently in Great Britain shortly after. Following the death of his father, Reed finally returned to London to find that Esther's father had died during Reed's return trip to Britain. Reed and Esther married in May 1770 at Saint Luke's, Cripplegate, near the City of London. Finding the de Berdt family in financial difficulties, Reed remained in London long enough to help settle his wife's family's affairs. Esther's mother joined the couple sailing for North America in October 1770.

The Reeds would have five children: Joseph, who would become a prominent lawyer; Denis de Berdt; George Washington, who would become a Navy commander; Esther; and Martha.

Reed owned two slaves.

== Death ==
In 1784, Reed visited England with the hope of improving his health but was not successful. He returned to Pennsylvania and died in Philadelphia on March 5, 1785, at the age of 43. Reed was initially interred in the Second Presbyterian Church cemetery in Philadelphia. Both he and his wife were reinterred to Laurel Hill Cemetery in 1868.

Political offices
Preceded by Thomas Wharton Jr.	Member, Supreme Executive Council of Pennsylvania, representing the County of Philadelphia; November 24, 1778 – October 16, 1781	Succeeded by John Bayard
Preceded by George Bryan	President of Pennsylvania; December 1, 1778 – November 15, 1781	Succeeded by William Moore
Military offices
Preceded by Horatio Gates	Adjutant Generals of the U. S. Army; June 5, 1776 – January 22, 1777	Succeeded by Arthur St. Clair (acting)
