= William Moore (Pennsylvania politician, died 1793) =

Pennsylvania politician

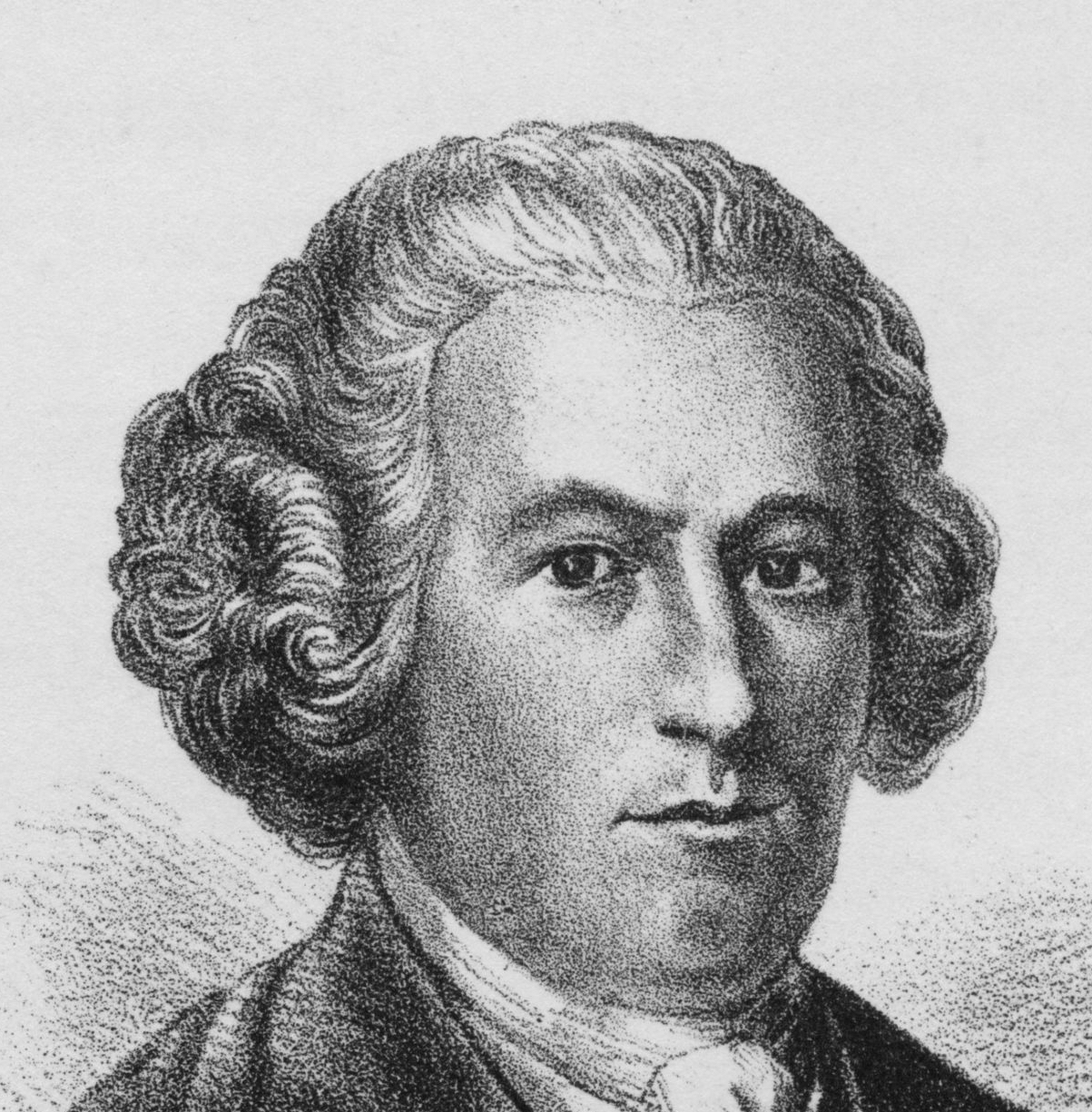

4th President of Pennsylvania
- In office November 15, 1781 – November 7, 1782
- Vice President: James Potter
- Preceded by: Joseph Reed
- Succeeded by: John Dickinson

3rd Vice President of Pennsylvania
- In office November 11, 1779 – November 14, 1781
- President: Joseph Reed
- Preceded by: Matthew Smith
- Succeeded by: James Potter

Judge of the Court of Errors and Appeals
- In office 1783–?

Pennsylvania General Assembly
- In office 1784–?

Personal details
- Born: c. 1735 Philadelphia, Province of Pennsylvania, British America
- Died: July 24, 1793 (aged 57–58) Philadelphia, Pennsylvania, U.S.
- Spouse: Sarah Lloyd
- Profession: Merchant, politician, banker, judge

William Moore (c. 1735 – July 24, 1793) was a Pennsylvania statesman and politician of the Revolutionary era. He served as Vice-President of Pennsylvania from 1779 to 1781, and then as President from 1781 to 1782. (The positions of President and vice-president of Pennsylvania are analogous to the modern offices of Governor and Lieutenant Governor, respectively). Moore was the only man formally elected to both offices. He was also a judge, state legislator, director of the Bank of Pennsylvania and trustee of the University of Pennsylvania.

== Early life and family ==
William Moore was born c. 1735 in Philadelphia in the Province of Pennsylvania. He was the son of Robert and Elizabeth Moore. Like his father, William became a successful merchant. In 1757 he married Sarah Lloyd, a member of one of Philadelphia's oldest and most powerful families. William and Sarah had at least one son. A daughter, Elizabeth married the French diplomat, François Barbé-Marbois (1745–1837), in Philadelphia June 17, 1784.

== Political life ==
Moore supported colonists' protests against the Stamp Act, imposed upon the American colonies by Great Britain in 1765, but did not embrace some of the more radical ideas of the early Revolutionaries. It was only after his sixteen-year-old son joined the Continental Army's 1776 Canadian campaign that William embraced the Revolution. Nonetheless, his reputation as a moderate brought him support from sometimes opposing political factions.

In 1776 Moore was appointed to the Council of Safety, which governed the State in the early days of the Revolution. The following year he was appointed to the Board of War. In 1778 he was elected to the Continental Congress but declined to serve, preferring a seat on the Supreme Executive Council of Pennsylvania. He became vice-president of the Council on November 11, 1779, defeating James Read. He was reelected November 14, 1780, garnering fifty three of the sixty votes cast and easily defeating James Potter and John Lacey. His second Vice-Presidential term expired November 14, 1781. On that day he was elected the fourth President of the Supreme Executive Council. Moore received sixty four of the sixty seven votes cast, easily defeating James Ewing, James Potter, and John Lacey, each of whom received a single vote. (Potter was elected to the Vice-Presidency that day, and would be succeeded by Ewing in 1782.) While most Presidents and Vice-Governors and Presidents of Pennsylvania took office immediately upon their election, Moore did not take the oath of office until the following day and did not begin his presidency until November 15. Moore served a single term as president, holding office through November 7, 1782. He was the only vice-president of Pennsylvania to be formally elected to the Presidency of the State. (Although George Bryan today is recognized as a former Governor of Pennsylvania he was never actually elected or elevated to the Presidency and was not addressed as such during his time in office.)

== Later roles ==
As Vice-President, and then President of Pennsylvania, Moore served as an ex officio member of the Board of Trustees of the University of Pennsylvania, and as President of the Board from 1781 to 1782. After leaving the Presidency he served as an elected Trustee until 1789.

In 1783 Moore was commissioned a judge of the Court of Errors and Appeals. In 1784 he was elected to the General Assembly. In that same year he became a director of the Bank of Pennsylvania.

== Death ==
William Moore died in Philadelphia on July 24, 1793.

Political offices
Preceded by George Bryan	Member, Supreme Executive Council of Pennsylvania, representing the City of Philadelphia; October 18, 1779 – October 14, 1782	Succeeded by James Irvine
Preceded by Matthew Smith (left office October 23, 1779)	Vice-President of Pennsylvania; November 11, 1779 – November 14, 1781	Succeeded by James Potter
Preceded by Joseph Reed	President of Pennsylvania; November 15, 1781 – November 7, 1782	Succeeded by John Dickinson
