= Joseph Gardner (physician) =

American physician

Dr. Joseph Gardner (1752–1794) was an American physician who was a delegate for Pennsylvania to the Continental Congress in 1784 and 1785.

== Background ==
Joseph was born in Honey Brook Township of Chester County, Pennsylvania in 1752. His father Francis Gardner immigrated to Pennsylvania from Ireland in 1733. Joseph Gardner would go on to study medicine at the University of Pennsylvania. He later practiced medicine in Philadelphia. Joseph married Isabella Cochran (1747–1794) and had three children.

During the Revolutionary War, Gardner raised two battalions of troops for service. He also served on the county's Committee of Safety in 1776-1777, and as a representative in the Pennsylvania Provincial Assembly from 1776 to 1778. In 1779, he was member of the state's supreme executive council. Pennsylvania sent him as a delegate to the Continental Congress twice, in 1784 and 1785. Throughout this time, he continued the practice of medicine.

Gardner moved to Elkton, Maryland in 1792, and also practiced as a physician. He died in Elkton, Cecil County, Maryland in 1794.

Preceded by John Mackey	Member, Supreme Executive Council of Pennsylvania, representing Chester County; 23 October 1779—2 November 1782	Succeeded by John McDowell
