= David Redick =

American politician

David Jermah Redick

9th Vice-President of Pennsylvania
- In office 14 October 1788 – 5 November 1788
- Preceded by: Peter Muhlenberg
- Succeeded by: George Ross

Personal details
- Born: 5 July 1753 Galway, Ireland
- Died: 28 September 1805 (aged 52) Washington, Pennsylvania
- Party: Democratic Party
- Spouse: Miss Hoge
- Profession: soldier, surveyor, lawyer, politician

David Jermah Redick (5 July 1753 – 28 September 1805) was a Pennsylvania surveyor, lawyer, politician, and the 9th Vice-President of Pennsylvania.

== Biography ==
Redick was born in Galway, Ireland, and after coming to America made his home for several years in Lancaster County, Pennsylvania. Redick was a veteran of the American Revolutionary War and was in the 1st Brigade Georgia Militia. He read law and was admitted to the bar in 1782. Redick was elected to the American Philosophical Society in 1789.

=== Family ===
He married the niece of business associate David Hoge. Redick and his wife had at least three children. A son became a lawyer and died at a young age. His daughter, Nancy, and her husband inherited the Redick home in Washington and lived there until their own deaths. Another daughter married and settled in Louisville, Kentucky.

=== Early life ===
Not much is known about Redick's early life, he immigrated to America in 1765. He lived with his parents, ((Who are unknown)), in somewhere around Pennsylvania or New York.

=== Career ===
Redick accompanied Hoge (c. 1780) to survey the latter's land holdings in the Chartiers Valley, in western Pennsylvania. Under Hoge's direction he platted the town of Bassett Town, which was soon renamed Washington, Pennsylvania. At that time, Washington County was in the process of being established, and Hoge apparently wanted to establish a town that could serve as the new county's center of government. Redick purchased a lot on the town's main street and lived there until his death.

==== War Service ====
He served in the army during the American Revolution and served in the army for about 6 years, reaching the rank of NCO.

=== Public service ===
Redick was elected to represent Washington County on the Supreme Executive Council of Pennsylvania in 1786. He was elected Vice-President of the Council (a position analogous to Lieutenant Governor) on 14 October 1788, following the resignation of Peter Muhlenberg, and served until the next regular election, 5 November 1788, when he was succeeded by George Ross. His was the second-shortest tenure as Vice-President, and the third-shortest of any Pennsylvania Governor or Lieutenant Governor. Although his time in office was brief he was the first statewide officer from Pennsylvania's western frontier. All of the Presidents of Pennsylvania had been elected to Council from either the City or County of Philadelphia, and the other Vice-Presidents had represented counties of southeastern Pennsylvania, none farther west than York. The county Redick represented hadn't even existed when the Supreme Executive Council was established less than twelve years earlier.

Perhaps due to his abilities as a surveyor, in 1787 Redick was appointed an agent for the Commonwealth for communicating with the Governor of New York regarding Connecticut's claims to land in Pennsylvania. He was a member of Pennsylvania's 1790 Constitutional Convention and was a signer of the new charter. In 1791 he became prothonotary and clerk of courts of Washington County.

During his brief period as Vice-President of Pennsylvania Redick was an ex officio member of the Board of Trustees of the University of Pennsylvania.

=== Whiskey Rebellion ===
Redick was involved in the Whiskey Rebellion—not on the side of the rebels but, rather, "in defense of law, order, and the constitution." With William Findley, he presented the document representing the rebels' surrender to President Washington and Alexander Hamilton in Carlisle, Pennsylvania in October 1794.

=== Death ===
Redick died on 28 September 1805 in Washington, Pennsylvania from a heart attack. He was buried with Masonic honors. His grave site is in the Old Washington Cemetery in downtown Washington.

Political offices
Preceded by General John Neville	Member, Supreme Executive Council of Pennsylvania, representing Washington County; 20 November 1786 – 3 December 1789	Succeeded by Henry Taylor
Preceded by Peter Muhlenberg	Vice-President of Pennsylvania; 14 October 1788 – 5 November 1788	Succeeded by George Ross
