= James McLene =

American politician

James McLene (October 11, 1730 – March 18, 1806) was an American farmer and political leader from Franklin County, Pennsylvania. He was a delegate for Pennsylvania to the Continental Congress in 1779 and 1780.

== Biography ==
At the state level, McLene served as a delegate to the Pennsylvania state constitutional convention in 1776 and again in 1789, a number of terms in the state legislature, and briefly as Speaker, during the British occupation of Philadelphia. Following his terms in the Continental Congress, he served on Pennsylvania's Supreme Executive Council until the conclusion of the war.

His early efforts at the Carpenter's Hall Council (Philadelphia, 1776), shortly before the signing of the Declaration of Independence, were instrumental in marshaling Pennsylvania's resolve to support the Flying Camp of the Continental Army.

== Death and interment ==
McLene died in Antrim Township in Franklin County on March 18, 1806 and was buried in the Brown's Mill Graveyard there.

Preceded by Jonathan Hoge	Member, Supreme Executive Council of Pennsylvania, representing Cumberland County; November 9, 1778 – December 28, 1779	Succeeded by Robert Whitehill
Preceded by position created	Member, Supreme Executive Council of Pennsylvania, representing Franklin County; February 2, 1785 – October 24, 1787	Succeeded by Abraham Smith
