= George Bryan =

American judge

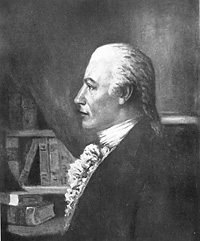

2nd President of Pennsylvania
- In office May 23, 1778 – December 1, 1778
- Vice President: Himself
- Preceded by: Thomas Wharton
- Succeeded by: Joseph Reed

1st Vice-President of Pennsylvania
- In office March 6, 1777 – October 11, 1779
- Succeeded by: Matthew Smith

Pennsylvania Supreme Court
- In office April 5, 1780 – January 27, 1791

Pennsylvania General Assembly
- In office ?–?

Personal details
- Born: 1731 Dublin, Kingdom of Ireland
- Died: January 27, 1791 (aged 59–60) Philadelphia, Pennsylvania, U.S.
- Resting place: Laurel Hill Cemetery, Philadelphia, Pennsylvania, U.S.
- Profession: Businessman, politician, judge

George Bryan (1731 – January 27, 1791) was an Irish born American Pennsylvania businessman, and politician of the Revolutionary era. He served as the first vice-president of Pennsylvania (analogous to lieutenant governor) and its second president (governor) following the Declaration of Independence from Great Britain. He was an early abolitionist and sponsored the bill which helped bring about abolition in Philadelphia. He also served as a judge of the Pennsylvania Supreme Court.

== Early life and family ==
Bryan was born at Old Bridge, Church Street, Dublin in the Kingdom of Ireland on August 11, 1731, to a merchant. He emigrated to Philadelphia in 1752 to join a business partnership arranged by his father. That partnership soon came to an end, but Bryan went on to become a successful businessman, both as a retailer and as an importer and exporter. He married Elizabeth Smith in 1757. Their family would number ten children. His son, Samuel Bryan (1759–1821) was a Pennsylvanian Anti-Federalist author. He was inducted into the original American Philosophical Society around 1758.

== Politics ==
Bryan was an active member of the Presbyterian Church, and during the late 1750s and early 1760s tried to mediate a conflict that had arisen between two opposing factions of that denomination during the Great Awakening. That experience led to his involvement in local and provincial politics. After Britain's passage of the Stamp Act in 1765, Bryan took an active role in the American opposition, joining other Philadelphia Merchants in signing the Non-Importation Agreement. This likely led to his bankruptcy in 1771.

Bryan was considered a "radical" regarding the issue of Independence, and as such is listed in the company of such men as Thomas Paine. Bad health limited his political activities during the early 1770s, but after the adoption of the 1776 Pennsylvania Constitution he became an advocate of the unicameral legislature and executive council outlined in that document. On March 5, 1777, he was elected the first vice-president of that Council. Although it would become standard procedure for presidents and vice-presidents to take office immediately upon election, Bryan did not take the oath of office until the following day, March 6, and according to the State Constitution could not exercise his office until that time. Thus, his term officially began March 6, 1777. Bryan was reelected to the Vice-Presidency on November 21, 1777.

Bryan, and subsequent vice-presidents, may be referred to properly as Vice-Governors and presidents of Pennsylvania; however, the position is analogous to the modern office of Lieutenant Governor, and vice-presidents of Council are often listed with those who have held the latter title.

Some of the anti-Federalist letters of Centinel, primarily attributed to Bryan's son Samuel, have been attributed to Bryan himself.

== President of Pennsylvania ==
Thomas Wharton, the first President of Pennsylvania, died in office on May 23, 1778, in Lancaster, Pennsylvania. (The State government had evacuated to Lancaster during the British occupation of Philadelphia.) According to the provisions of the 1776 State Constitution Bryan assumed the duties of the late President. Some sources consider Bryan to have been merely the Acting President during the seven months that followed. Others—including the records of the Council itself—deny him even that title and continue to address him as simply Vice-President, as he was never elected or officially elevated to the Presidency. Nonetheless, perhaps due to the length of his service at the head of the council, both the Commonwealth of Pennsylvania and the National Governors Association today recognize George Bryan as a full-fledged Governor of Pennsylvania, serving from May 23, 1778, through December 1, 1778.

It was under Bryan's leadership that the Council returned to Philadelphia on June 26, 1778, after almost nine months in Lancaster. On December 1, Bryan was soundly defeated in his bid to be formally elected to the Presidency, receiving only one of sixty three votes cast and losing to Joseph Reed. However, he handily defeated Joseph Hart to retain the Vice-Presidency, winning sixty two of the sixty three votes cast for that office. Bryan remained vice-president for almost a year, resigning the office October 11, 1779. No reason for the resignation is noted in the records of the council. Matthew Smith was elected to fill the vacancy and took office that same day. Bryan continued to serve on the council for several days after leaving the Vice-Presidency, and on October 18 was succeeded by William Moore as Counsellor for the City of Philadelphia.

Following his service with the Executive Council, in 1780, Bryan was appointed a judge on the Pennsylvania Supreme Court. He also served in the Pennsylvania General Assembly. An early abolitionist, Bryan believed that slavery was a moral disgrace, and he authored the first legislation in history to abolish the practice. This legislation served as a model for the gradual emancipation of slaves throughout the northern colonies.

In the late 1780s, Bryan remained an ardent advocate of the unicameral legislature and executive council still in place in Pennsylvania, and he opposed adoption of the 1787 Federal Constitution largely because it created a bicameral legislature and a single executive.

== University of Pennsylvania ==
Like most of the presidents and vice-presidents of Council who came after him, Bryan may have served as an ex officio member of the Board of Trustees of the University of Pennsylvania. University records are not clear on this issue, but it is certain that, after leaving the Vice-Presidency in 1779, Bryan was appointed a Trustee in his own right, and served that body until his death in 1791. He was Treasurer of the Board from 1779 to 1788.

== Death ==
Bryan died in 1791 and was interred at Laurel Hill Cemetery, Section C, Lot 13, Philadelphia.

== See also ==
- List of United States governors born outside the United States

Political offices
Preceded by office created	Member, Supreme Executive Council of Pennsylvania, representing the City of Philadelphia; March 4, 1777 – October 18, 1779	Succeeded by William Moore
Preceded by office created	Vice-President of Pennsylvania; March 6, 1777 – October 11, 1779	Succeeded by Matthew Smith
Preceded by Thomas Wharton Jr.	President of Pennsylvania (acting); May 23, 1778 – December 1, 1778	Succeeded by Joseph Reed
