= Thomas Wharton Jr. =

American politician (1735–1778)

Thomas Wharton, Jr.
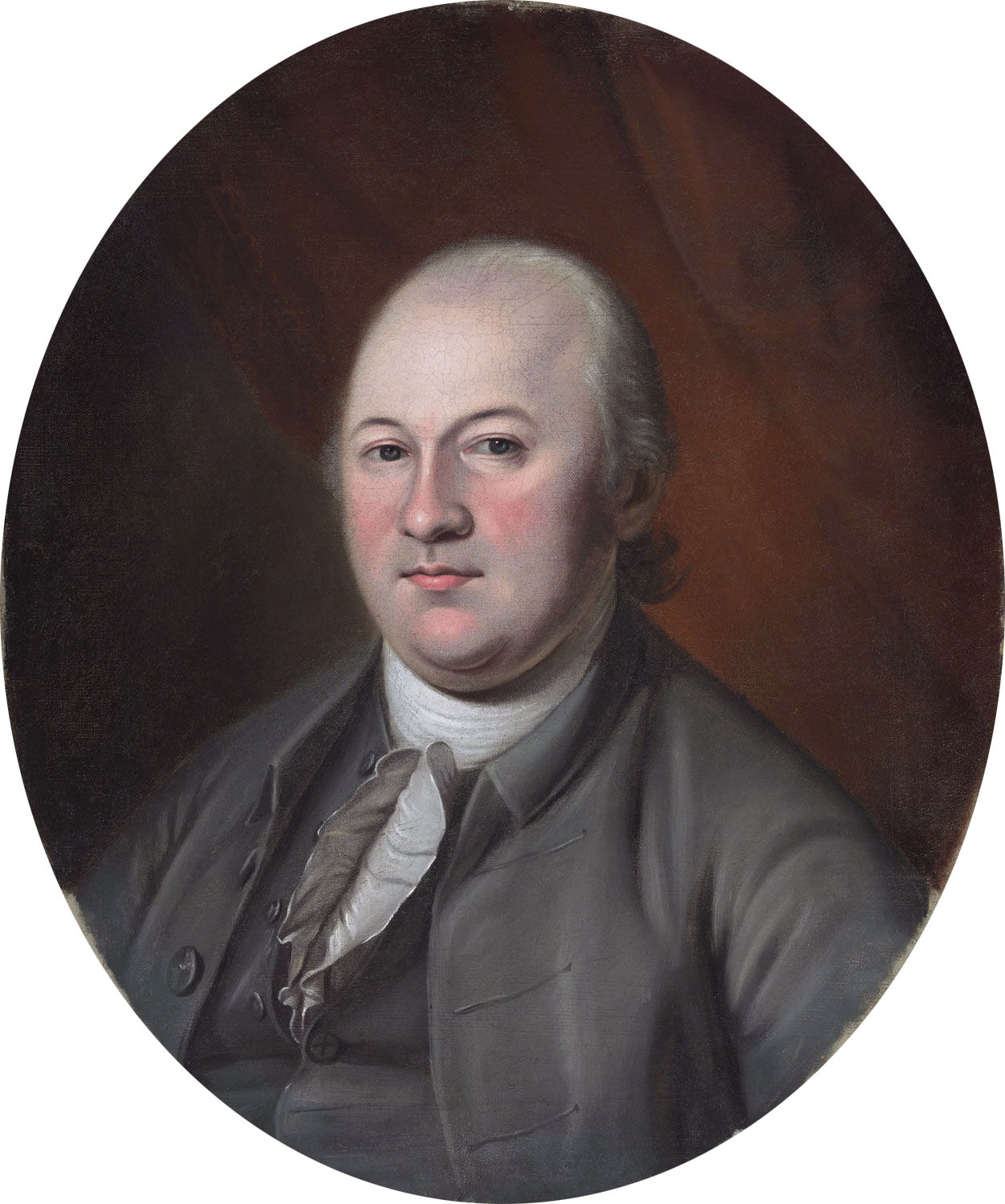
- Portrait of Wharton by Charles Willson Peale

1st President of Pennsylvania
- In office March 5, 1777 – May 22, 1778
- Vice President: George Bryan
- Preceded by: John Penn (as Governor of Pennsylvania)
- Succeeded by: George Bryan

Personal details
- Born: 1735 Chester County, Province of Pennsylvania, British America
- Died: May 22, 1778 (aged 42–43) Lancaster, Pennsylvania, U.S.
- Spouse(s): Susannah Lloyd (1735-1772) m. 1762; Elizabeth Fishbourne (1752-1826) m. 1774
- Profession: Merchant

Thomas Wharton Jr. (1735 – May 22, 1778) was a Pennsylvania merchant and politician of the Revolutionary era. He served as the first president of Pennsylvania (an office akin to governor) following the Declaration of Independence from Great Britain.

== Early life and family ==
Wharton was born in Chester County in the Province of Pennsylvania in 1735. He was born into one of Philadelphia's most prominent early Quaker families. He was known as "Junior" to distinguish him from a cousin of the same name. His father, John Wharton, served as coroner of Chester County. His paternal grandfather, Thomas Wharton, a native of Westmorland, England, came to Pennsylvania around 1683 and served on the Philadelphia Common Council (1713–1718).

In 1762, Wharton married Susannah Lloyd, the daughter of Thomas Lloyd and great-granddaughter of Thomas Lloyd, an early governor of Pennsylvania and a colleague of William Penn. They were married by a pastor in Christ Church, an Anglican church, and were therefore disowned by the Quakers of the Philadelphia Monthly Meeting. Wharton was thereafter associated with the Anglican Church, but never formally converted. The couple had five children before Susannah's death ten years later. Wharton then married Elizabeth Fishbourne and had three children with her. Wharton owned a country home called "Twickenham" near Abington Meeting in Montgomery County. His brother-in-law (Elizabeth's brother), Benjamin Fishbourn, was the first ever person rejected by the Senate for a Presidential nomination when Senator James Gunn of Georgia employed Senatorial courtesy for the first time to have Fishbourn's nomination rejected.

The Wharton family was involved in various areas of business and public service, including shipbuilding for the Continental Navy. Members of the Wharton family served in the Continental Congress and the State Legislature, as Mayor of Philadelphia and on the City Council, in positions of military leadership, and in other offices.

== American Revolution ==
Wharton became a merchant and was well respected for his character as well as his business acumen. He was elected to the American Philosophical Society in 1761. Like many other colonial merchants, Wharton signed petitions and joined boycotts in protest of the 1765 Stamp Act and the 1767 Townshend Acts, but he was not an early leader of the resistance movement. His rise to prominence in the Patriot cause followed Parliament's passage of the Boston Port Act in 1774. At a public meeting held in Philadelphia on May 20, 1774, Wharton was chosen as a member of the Committee of Correspondence, and later was one of twenty-five citizens who formed the Committee of Safety, Pennsylvania's governing body in the early days of the Revolution. On July 24, 1776, he became president of that body. As such he was a member of the committee directing that a new constitution be drafted for the state.

== President of Pennsylvania ==
Coat of Arms of Thomas Wharton

On September 28, 1776, Pennsylvania adopted a new state constitution. This document created an Executive Council of twelve men. Although wealthy, upper class Pennsylvanians like John Dickinson and Robert Morris opposed this radically democratic constitution, Wharton supported it. On a joint ballot of the Council and the General Assembly Wharton was elected the first President of the Council.

Wharton, and each of his successors in that office, may be referred to, quite properly, as President of Pennsylvania. However, the position is analogous to the modern office of Governor, and Presidents of Council are often listed with those who have held the latter title.

Wharton was elected March 5, 1777 and took office immediately, under the title His Excellency Thomas Wharton, Junior, Esquire, President of the Supreme Executive Council of the Commonwealth of Pennsylvania, Captain General and Commander-in-Chief in and over the same. He held office until his death in 1778.

In September 1777, with British forces poised to take Philadelphia, the Executive Council evacuated to Lancaster, Pennsylvania. It was at this same time that the Continental Congress also evacuated to Lancaster and then to York, Pennsylvania. Wharton retreated to Lancaster along with other representatives of the State government. In the only election held while the Council was in Lancaster, Wharton was reelected President on November 21, 1777. (After the initial election of officers on March 5, 1777 annual leadership elections were held in the fall, following the popular elections in October.)

Wharton, as President, had some difficult decisions to make. He found it necessary to banish to Virginia several of his acquaintances and friends, most of them Quakers, because of the possibility that they were siding with the British. Although this action was thought prudent by the revolutionary authorities, it was not based on much evidence and Wharton's social connections suffered because of it.

== Death ==
On May 22, 1778, with the Council still in Lancaster, Wharton died in Lancaster at the age of 42 or 43. Vice-President George Bryan assumed the duties of the presidency upon Wharton's death. Wharton was given an elaborate funeral with full military honors, in accordance with his position as commander in chief of the State's forces, and was buried within the walls of Evangelical Trinity Church in Lancaster. At the time of his death, Thomas Wharton Jr. was survived by at least three sons.

A Commonwealth of Pennsylvania historical marker at Trinity Church commemorates both Wharton and Pennsylvania Governor Thomas Mifflin, the first and last Governors and Presidents of Pennsylvania under the 1776 State Constitution. The marker was dedicated in 1975 and is located on Duke Street in Lancaster. The text of the marker reads:

Holy Trinity
Lutheran Church
Founded in 1730.
A session for an Indian treaty was held in the original church building in 1762.
The present edifice was dedicated in 1766.
Here are interred the remains of Thomas Wharton (1778) and Gov. Thomas Mifflin (1800).

== See also ==
- List of governors of Pennsylvania

Political offices
Preceded by New creation	Member, Supreme Executive Council of Pennsylvania, representing the County of Philadelphia; March 4, 1777 – May 23, 1778	Succeeded by Joseph Reed
Preceded by Himself, as President of the Committee of Safety	President of Pennsylvania; March 5, 1777 – May 23, 1778 died in office	Succeeded by George Bryan
