= George Ross (Pennsylvania statesman) =

American politician

10th Vice-President of Pennsylvania
- In office November 5, 1788 – December 21, 1790
- Preceded by: David Redick
- Succeeded by: position dissolved

Personal details
- Born: 1746
- Died: 1801 (aged 54–55)
- Profession: politician

George Ross (1746–1801) was a Pennsylvania politician of the late eighteenth century.

== Biography ==
Ross was elected as Vice-President of Pennsylvania (a position equivalent to that of Lieutenant Governor) on November 5, 1788. He was then reelected unanimously on November 11, 1789, and served until December 21, 1790.

He was the last man to hold that office, as the Vice-Presidency (along with the rest of the Supreme Executive Council) was dissolved by the 1790 State Constitution. (The executive branch has been led since then by a governor; the position of Lieutenant Governor was added by the 1873 State Constitution.)

As Vice-President of Pennsylvania Ross served as an ex officio member of the Board of Trustees of the University of Pennsylvania.

Although the length of his term is comparable to, or exceeds, that of several other Presidents and Vice-Presidents of Pennsylvania, very little is known about Ross beyond the dates of his service.

He should not be confused with George Ross (1730–1779), one of Pennsylvania's delegates to the Continental Congress, a signer of the Declaration of Independence, and uncle (by marriage) of Betsy Ross.

Political offices
Preceded by John Whitehill	Member, Supreme Executive Council of Pennsylvania, representing Lancaster County; 16 October 1787 – 21 December 1790	Succeeded by position dissolved
Preceded by David Redick	Vice-President of Pennsylvania; 5 November 1788 – 21 December 1790	Succeeded by position dissolved
