= Matthew Smith (Pennsylvania statesman) =

American politician

2nd Vice-President of Pennsylvania
- In office 11 October 1779 – 23 October 1779
- Preceded by: George Bryan
- Succeeded by: William Moore

Personal details
- Born: 1734
- Died: July 22, 1794 (aged 59–60)
- Profession: politician

Matthew Smith (also spelled Mathew Smith; 1734 – July 22, 1794) was a Pennsylvania politician.

At twelve days, Smith's was the shortest tenure of the ten men who served as vice-president under the Commonwealth's 1776 Constitution—in fact, his was the shortest term of any governor or lieutenant governor in the history of the Commonwealth.

== Biography ==
Smith served briefly as Vice-President of Pennsylvania (a position analogous to the modern office of lieutenant governor), following the resignation of George Bryan on October 11, 1779. Smith was elected and took office that same day and served until his own resignation on October 23, 1779. At twelve days, Smith's was the shortest tenure of the ten men who served as vice-president under the Commonwealth's 1776 Constitution—in fact, his was the shortest term of any governor or lieutenant governor in the history of the Commonwealth. (John Bell served as governor for fourteen days in January 1947, and David Redick held the vice-presidency for twenty-two days in the fall of 1788.) As was the case with his predecessor, no reason is given for his resignation in the minutes of the Council.

By virtue of his office, Smith served as an ex officio member of the Board of Trustees of the University of Pennsylvania for a similarly brief period, October–November 1779.

Political offices
Preceded by John Bailey	Member, Supreme Executive Council of Pennsylvania, representing Lancaster County; 28 May 1778 – 5 January 1781	Succeeded by James Cunningham
Preceded by George Bryan	Vice-President of Pennsylvania; 11 October 1779 – 23 October 1779	Succeeded by William Moore (took office 11 November 1779)
