= James Ewing (Pennsylvania politician) =

American politician

Pennsylvania State Senate
- In office 1795–1799

Pennsylvania General Assembly
- In office 1784–1785

5th Vice-President of Pennsylvania
- In office November 7, 1782 – November 6, 1784
- Preceded by: James Potter
- Succeeded by: James Irvine

Pennsylvania General Assembly representing York County
- In office 1771–1776

Personal details
- Born: August 3, 1736 Lancaster County, Province of Pennsylvania, British America
- Died: March 1, 1806 (aged 69) York, Pennsylvania, U.S.
- Party: Federalist, Anti-Constitutionalist, Republican
- Spouse: Patience Wright
- Profession: soldier, politician

James Ewing (August 3, 1736 – March 1, 1806) was a Pennsylvania soldier, statesman, and politician of the Colonial, Revolutionary and post-Revolutionary eras. He served in the Pennsylvania General Assembly and also as Vice-President of Pennsylvania, a position comparable to that of Lieutenant Governor.

== Early life and family ==
James Ewing was born in 1736 in Lancaster County, Pennsylvania, the son of Thomas Ewing and Susanna Howard. Thomas Ewing was an Ulster-Scottish immigrant and had served in the Assembly when James was young. James married Patience Wright.

== Military service ==
In 1755, young Ewing joined General Edward Braddock’s expedition into western Pennsylvania, and in 1758 he served as a lieutenant in the Pennsylvania militia.

=== American Revolutionary War ===
On July 4, 1776, Ewing was commissioned a brigadier general in the Pennsylvania militia. Historian David Hackett Fischer characterized Ewing as a "hard-driving Scotch-Irish border chieftain".

On December 25 and December 26, 1776, Ewing commanded a brigade of five regiments in George Washington's crossing of the Delaware River, prior to the surprise attack on the Hessian forces in Trenton, New Jersey.

Positioned directly across from Trenton, Ewing and his troops were unable to cross the Delaware because of ice. Although Ewing has sometimes been criticized by historians for failing to join Washington on the other side of the river, Fischer argues that no one could have crossed the river at that point that night. Washington did not blame Ewing, writing that, "the Quantity of Ice was so great, that tho' he did every thing in his power to effect it, he could not get over."

== Political service ==
Ewing represented York County in the General Assembly from 1771 through 1776. In early 1776 he was one of the few Assemblymen calling for an immediate break with Great Britain. It was, in part, his enthusiasm for Independence that led to his general’s commission on July 4.

Following Independence Ewing aligned himself with wealthy business interests, as a Republican and Anti-Constitutionalist (the latter movement being opposed to the unicameral legislature of Pennsylvania’s 1776 Constitution), and later as a Federalist. In 1781 he won a seat on the Supreme Executive Council of Pennsylvania. On November 7, 1782, Ewing was elected Vice-President of Pennsylvania, earning thirty nine votes to the thirty four won by the incumbent, James Potter. (The position of Vice-President is analogous to the modern office of Lieutenant Governor.) He was unanimously reelected on November 6, 1783, and served until November 6, 1784, when he was succeeded by James Irvine. At one day short of two years, his vice-presidential term was one of the longest in the history of that short-lived office.

In 1784 Ewing served a one-year term in the General Assembly.

As Vice-President of Pennsylvania Ewing served as an ex officio member of the Board of Trustees of the University of Pennsylvania. In 1783 he also served as a trustee of Dickinson College in Carlisle, Pennsylvania. In 1789 he chaired a committee seeking to improve navigation on the Susquehanna River.

In 1795 he returned to elected office, as a Federalist member of the State Senate.

James Ewing died at his home near York, Pennsylvania, in 1806.

Political offices
Preceded by Jason Edgar	Member, Supreme Executive Council of Pennsylvania, representing York County; 9 February 1779 – 12 February 1779	Succeeded by Duane Cahill
Preceded by Mr. Thompson, Esquire	Member, Supreme Executive Council of Pennsylvania, representing York County; 26 October 1781 – 26 October 1784	Succeeded by Richard McCallister
Preceded by James Potter	Vice-President of Pennsylvania; 7 November 1782 – 6 November 1784	Succeeded by James Irvine
