= Supreme Executive Council of Pennsylvania =

Former government of Pennsylvania

Supreme Executive Council of the Commonwealth of Pennsylvania
- Type: Directorial government
- Status: Disestablished
- Reports to: Pennsylvania General Assembly
- Term length: 1 year
- Constituting instrument: Pennsylvania Constitution (1776)
- Precursor: Colonial Government of Pennsylvania
- Formation: 1777
- First holder: Thomas Wharton Jr.
- Final holder: Thomas Mifflin
- Abolished: 1790
- Superseded by: Government of Pennsylvania

The Supreme Executive Council of the Commonwealth of Pennsylvania (Note: Also known as The Supreme Executive Council of Pennsylvania and, where state affiliation was understood, The Supreme Executive Council, The Executive Council, or simply Council or The Council) was the collective directorial executive branch of the Pennsylvanian state government between 1777 and 1790. It was headed by a president and a vice president (analogous to a governor and lieutenant governor, respectively). The best-known member of the Council was Benjamin Franklin, who also served as its sixth president.

== 1776 Constitution ==
The 1776 Constitution of the Commonwealth of Pennsylvania was framed by a constitutional convention called at the urging of the Continental Congress. The convention began work in Philadelphia on July 15, 1776, less than two weeks following adoption of the Declaration of Independence. The Constitution was adopted September 28 of the same year. The document included both A Declaration of the Rights of the Inhabitants of the Commonwealth and a Plan or Frame of Government. The latter includes 47 sections, several of which deal with the formation and function of the Supreme Executive Council.

Section 3: "The supreme executive power shall be vested in a president and council."

Section 19: "For the present the supreme executive council of this state shall consist of twelve persons chosen in the following manner..."

The city of Philadelphia and the eleven counties existing at that time each elected a representative to sit on the Council. These eleven counties were Philadelphia (at that time a governmental entity distinct from the City of Philadelphia), Chester, Bucks, Lancaster, York, Cumberland, Berks, Northampton, Bedford, Northumberland, and Westmoreland. Seats were added for Washington, Fayette, Franklin, Montgomery, Dauphin, Luzerne, Huntingdon, and Allegheny as those counties were established. Many of these counties occupied considerably different and often much larger territories in the late 18th century than they presently do.

Counsellors were elected to three-year terms; the terms were staggered so that one third would be contested each year. (Counsellors is the spelling used in the Constitution itself, although the word is also rendered councillors, counsellors, and councilors in other documents.) The president and vice-president of the Council were chosen from those twelve counsellors, elected to one-year terms by an annual joint ballot of the Council and the General Assembly (the state legislature), usually held in November.

Section 20: The Council and its president were given power to

- appoint judges, attorneys general, naval officers, and other officers
- fill offices vacant due to death, resignation, removal, or disqualification
- correspond with other states
- prepare business to present to the General Assembly
- serve as judges on cases of impeachment
- grant pardons and remit fines (except in cases of impeachment)
- grant reprieves in cases of treason and murder
- ensure that the laws and other acts of the General Assembly were carried out
- lay embargoes and prohibit the export of any commodity (in certain circumstances)

Additionally:

- the president of council was to serve as commander in chief of the military forces of the state
- the Council was ordered to keep an accurate record of its proceedings

=== Meeting place and time ===
The 1776 Constitution stipulated that the Council meet at the same time and location as the General Assembly. In practice, the Council sat year-round: there was no formal cycle of sessions (e.g. 110th United States Congress) and no specific date for the start of term of councilors or council officers.

The Supreme Executive Council formally convened March 4, 1777. The first president and vice-president were elected the following day. The Council sat in the Pennsylvania State House in Philadelphia, now known as Independence Hall. It met in what had been the Governor's Council Chamber during British rule. The Executive Council, along with the General Assembly, moved to Lancaster, Pennsylvania, ahead of the British occupation of Philadelphia in the fall of 1777—the last meeting in Philadelphia took place on September 23 and the first in Lancaster on October 1. The Council returned to Philadelphia June 26, 1778.

The Council was replaced by a single governor on December 21, 1790.

== Presidents of Council ==
Seven men served as president of the Supreme Executive Council. (One, George Bryan, was never elected to the position, but today is considered by the Commonwealth to have been a full-fledged governor of Pennsylvania, perhaps due to the length of his term as acting president.) Several figure prominently in the history of Pennsylvania, but none more so than Dr. Benjamin Franklin. His presidency was one of his last acts of public service, and he died less than two years after leaving office. Franklin was also the longest-serving president, having held the office for slightly over three years. There is some question about the de facto end of his term, suggesting that the aging Franklin was not actively involved in affairs of state toward the end of his presidency. (This is certainly not a consensus view, as other sources report that all actions of the Council during his term had Franklin's approval, even if that meant convening the Council at Franklin's home.) The shortest term was that of George Bryan, who served as acting president for just over six months. Although these men may be referred to properly as Presidents of Pennsylvania their office is analogous to the modern office of governor, and they are often included in lists of those who have held the latter title. Presidents and vice-presidents were styled His Excellency.

President	Start of term	End of term	Notes
Thomas Wharton Jr.	March 5, 1777	May 23, 1778	died in office
George Bryan	May 23, 1778	December 1, 1778	Acting President upon death of Wharton
Joseph Reed	December 1, 1778	November 15, 1781	
William Moore	November 15, 1781	November 7, 1782	
John Dickinson	November 7, 1782	October 18, 1785	previously President of Delaware; he did not formally relinquish that title until January 12, 1783
Benjamin Franklin	October 18, 1785	November 5, 1788	Founding Father of the United States
Thomas Mifflin	November 5, 1788	December 21, 1790	became first governor of Pennsylvania under 1790 Constitution

=== Legacy ===
The neighborhood of South Philadelphia contains a series of east-west streets named in honor of Pennsylvania's presidents and early governors. Moving south on South 25th Street are Wharton, Reed and Dickinson Streets. (Bryan, never officially elected to the office, is omitted.) The next street south of Dickinson appears as Franklin Street on Barnes' New Map of the Consolidated City of Philadelphia, 1855. A city ordinance of 1858 changed the name of Franklin Street to its current name, Tasker Street. Moore Street, out of sequence, follows after one intervening street (Morris). Moore is followed by Mifflin Street, McKean Street, and Snyder Street (the latter being Pennsylvania's second and third governors under the 1790 Constitution). Wharton Street borders Wharton Square Park, although it is not clear if the park is named after Thomas Wharton or another member of his prominent family. Dickinson College and the Dickinson School of Law, both in Carlisle, Pennsylvania, were named after John Dickinson.

== Vice-presidents of Council ==
Similarly, the office of Vice-President of Pennsylvania is analogous to the modern office of Lieutenant Governor. Of the ten men who held the office, two succeeded to the presidency (the first—Bryan—de facto, the second—Moore—de jure). The longest vice-presidential term was that of George Bryan; he served over two and a half years, although he also served as de facto acting president for six months concurrent with his vice-presidential term. The shortest term was that of Matthew Smith, who served for twelve days in October 1779.

Vice-President	Start of term	End of term	Notes
George Bryan	March 6, 1777	October 11, 1779	resigned
Matthew Smith	October 11, 1779	October 23, 1779	resigned
William Moore	November 11, 1779	November 14, 1781	became president of Council following his term as VP
James Potter	November 15, 1781	November 7, 1782	
James Ewing	November 7, 1782	November 6, 1784	
James Irvine	November 6, 1784	October 10, 1785	resigned
Charles Biddle	October 10, 1785	October 31, 1787	
Peter Muhlenberg	October 31, 1787	October 14, 1788	resigned
David Redick	October 14, 1788	November 5, 1788	
George Ross	November 5, 1788	December 21, 1790	

=== "Acting" presidents ===
At least one source credits four vice-presidents with having served as acting presidents:

- George Bryan (acting president May 23, 1778 – December 1, 1778)
- James Potter (acting president October 8 – November 7, 1782)
- Charles Biddle (acting president October 10–18, 1785)
- David Redick (acting president October 14 – November 5, 1788)

With the exception of Bryan, the Commonwealth of Pennsylvania makes no such distinction, and its listing of the state's early governors includes neither Potter, Biddle, nor Redick. (presidents of Pennsylvania are sometimes included in the listing of former governors). None of these men (including Bryan) was given the title of acting president during his time in office—each continued to be addressed as Vice-President and was titled Acting President only after the fact. (And, regarding all but Bryan, the honor is strictly unofficial.)

During George Bryan's "term" as acting president, the office of president was, in fact, vacant—Thomas Wharton died May 23, 1778, and an election to choose his successor was not held until December 1—due perhaps to the Council's evacuation to Lancaster during that time. At over seven months, Bryan's tenure was such that today he is considered a full-fledged governor by the Commonwealth of Pennsylvania.

The situations of the three other "acting presidents" is less clear, although there are some similarities. In each instance the president was replaced—or due to be replaced—as his county's Counsellor before the completion of his term as President. For example, Redick's supposed acting presidency spanned the final three weeks of Dr. Franklin's presidential term. Franklin's three-year term as counsellor from the City of Philadelphia was to expire on or around October 17, 1788—two weeks before the conclusion of his final one-year presidential term on October 31. The 1776 Constitution is not specific on the matter, but as the president and vice-president were chosen from among the members of the Council, it appears that most presidents chose to leave that office, or were replaced, prior to the expiration of their term as counsellor, rather than have an executive preside over a body of which he was no longer a member. Thus, these "acting presidencies" may have spanned the period between the de facto end of one presidency (due to term limits) and the formal election of a successor. Franklin, for instance, was succeeded as counsellor for the City of Philadelphia by Samuel Miles on October 20, but his presidency officially did not end until November 5. If Franklin did indeed continue to exercise the office during those final weeks not only would he have been presiding beyond the end of his term as counsellor but also beyond the three-year term limit established by the 1776 Constitution. The official minutes of the Council contain no indication that the president in any of these situations (Moore, Dickinson and Franklin, respectively) had formally left, relinquished or been removed from office; nonetheless during these periods the president was absent from council meetings, which were thus overseen by the vice-president. This suggests that any "interim administration" was established quietly and "off the record".

A similar situation occurred at the end of Joseph Reed's presidency. Reed was succeeded as counsellor from Philadelphia County by John Bayard on October 16, 1781 but ostensibly remained president until William Moore took office on November 15. Yet no claims of an "acting presidency" have been made for Moore, who held the Vice-Presidency during this interim period, immediately prior to his election as president.

Similarly, Charles Biddle appears to have retained the Vice-Presidency—at least officially—even after leaving his seat on the Council. The Commonwealth of Pennsylvania reports that Biddle's vice-presidential term extended to October 31, 1787, at which time Peter Muhlenberg succeeded him in that office. However, Biddle's term as counsellor from Berks County ended eighteen days earlier, on October 13, when he was succeeded in that office by James Read. Furthermore, Biddle was elected secretary of the Council on October 23, a clerical position that likely would not have been assumed by one who was also an officer of the Council and a high state official.

== Leadership elections ==
The first election of a president and vice-president of Pennsylvania took place March 5, 1777, the day after the Council first convened. Thereafter, leadership elections took place in the fall, generally in November, following the popular election (held the second Tuesday in October) in which counsellors and Assemblymen were elected by eligible citizens. Routine elections involved a joint ballot of the Council and the General Assembly. Several other elections were held to fill vacancies resulting from resignation; these involved only a vote by the Council rather than a joint ballot with the Assembly. More often than not, records do not list contenders (other than the winners) or vote tallies, saying simply that a particular gentleman was duly elected president and another vice-president. Presidents and vice-presidents were elected to one-year terms. They could be reelected, but their term as president or vice-president could not (in theory) extend beyond the end of their three-year term as counsellor.

Date	President	Vice-President	Purpose
March 5, 1777	Thomas Wharton	George Bryan	initial election
November 21, 1777	Thomas Wharton	George Bryan	annual election (note: only election held in Lancaster)
December 1, 1778	Joseph Reed (61); George Bryan (1); James Read (1)	George Bryan (62); Joseph Hart (1)	annual election
October 11, 1779	–	Matthew Smith	to fill vacancy following Bryan's resignation
November 11, 1779	Joseph Reed; William Moore	William Moore; James Read	annual election
November 14, 1780	Joseph Reed (59); William Moore (1)	William Moore (53); James Potter (6); General Lacey (1)	annual election
November 14, 1781	William Moore(64); James Ewing (1); James Potter (1); John Lacey (1)	James Potter(38); James Ewing (28)	annual election
November 7, 1782	John Dickinson (41); James Potter (32)	James Ewing (39); James Potter (34)	annual election
November 6, 1783	John Dickinson (unanimous)	James Ewing (unanimous)	annual election
November 6, 1784	John Dickinson; John Neville	James Irvine; John Neville	annual election
October 10, 1785	–	Charles Biddle	to fill vacancy following Irvine's resignation
October 18, 1785	Benjamin Franklin (unanimous)	–	it is not clear why a replacement for Dickinson was needed. Dickinson's name does not appear in council minutes after the October 10, 1785 meeting that elected Biddle to the vice-presidency.
October 29, 1785	Benjamin Franklin	Charles Biddle	annual election
November 4, 1786	Benjamin Franklin	Charles Biddle	
October 31, 1787	Benjamin Franklin	Peter Muhlenberg	annual election
October 14, 1788	–	David Redick	to fill vacancy following Muhlenberg's resignation
November 5, 1788	Thomas Mifflin	George Ross	annual election
November 11, 1789	Thomas Mifflin (unanimous)	George Ross (unanimous)	annual election

=== Discrepant dates and the oath of office ===
Throughout the history of the Council it was standard practice for newly elected presidents and vice-presidents to take office immediately upon election. However, there were a few instances in which an individual did not take the oath of office until the day following his election. Section 40 of the 1776 Constitution stipulates: "Every officer, whether judicial, executive or military, in authority under this commonwealth, shall take the following…oath of office before he enters on the execution of his office," meaning that an individual could not assume the duties of his office before taking the necessary oath. Cross referencing the election dates above with the preceding listings of terms in office will thus reveal several slight discrepancies, all resulting from a delayed administration of the oath:

- George Bryan, elected vice-president March 5, 1777, took office March 6.
- William Moore, elected president November 14, 1781, took office November 15.
- James Potter, elected vice-president November 14, 1781, took office November 15.

No reasons for the delays are noted in the minutes of the Council. Neither set of dates involved a conflict with the sabbath. There were other instances that involved reelections of men who had already been sworn into office at the start of their previous term and which thus caused no delay. These are not noted here.

== Counsellors ==
Counsellors were elected to represent each county in Pennsylvania as well as the city of Philadelphia. They were elected to three-year terms. Many served less than a full three, while others appear to have served slightly more. The Council sat year-round and there was no specific date set for the start of a session or of any counsellor's term. Rather, new counsellors appear to have begun their terms whenever they were able to reach Philadelphia following their elections. The general election at that time was held on the second Tuesday in October and most counsellors took office in late October or in November. In most instances it is easy to fix the date on which a particular counsellor's term began, as the Minutes of the Council will note that on a particular date a particular gentleman was administered the oath and admitted to his seat. Many counsellors had sporadic attendance, and several were absent for a year or more at a time. This was particularly true of representatives from the distant western counties, although the phenomenon was certainly not limited to those gentlemen. Some counsellors simply sat out the last several months of their terms, their names disappearing from the Minutes by late summer or early autumn. Thus, the following list of counsellors generally notes only the day on which each began his term; unless indicated otherwise it is assumed that each term extended to the beginning of the next, regardless of the incumbent's actual attendance. Counsellors were accorded the title of Esquire.

=== Term limits ===
With the Council set to be dissolved in December 1790, a provision of the new state constitution allowed counsellors and council officers whose terms would have expired that autumn to remain in office until December 21, rather than hold elections for new counsellors who would sit for only one or two months. Also, a review of the dates on which a particular county's counsellors began their terms will reveal several instances in which more than three years elapsed between the start of successive terms. It is uncertain whether the seat technically became vacant after exactly three years or if the incumbent's term extended to the start of his successor's, even if this meant exceeding the three-year term limit imposed by the 1776 Constitution.

=== List of counsellors ===
- The home counties of two early counsellors, John Evans and John Lowdan, has not yet been determined. Both were sitting when the Council first convened on March 4, 1777. It appears that one likely represented Chester County and the other York.

City of Philadelphia

1. George Bryan (March 4, 1777)
2. William Moore (October 18, 1779)
3. James Irvine (October 14, 1782)
4. Benjamin Franklin (October 17, 1785)
5. Samuel Miles (October 20, 1788 – December 21, 1790)

Philadelphia County

1. Joseph Wharton (March 4, 1777; died in office May 23, 1778)
2. Joseph Reed (November 24, 1778)
3. John Bayard (October 16, 1781)
4. John Dickinson (November 4, 1782)
5. Henry Hill (October 17, 1785)
6. Thomas Mifflin (October 20, 1788 – December 21, 1790)

Chester County

1. John Mackey (McKay, MacKay, Macky) (November 21, 1777)
2. Dr. Joseph Gardner (October 23, 1779)
3. John McDowell (November 2, 1782)
4. Evan Evans (October 28, 1785)
5. Richard Willing (October 16, 1788 – December 21, 1790)

Bucks County

1. Joseph Hart (July 23, 1777)
2. Gen. John Lacey Jr. (October 28, 1779)
3. George Wall Jr. (October 29, 1782)
4. Samuel Dean (November 1, 1785)
5. Amos Gregg (October 21, 1788 – December 21, 1790)

Lancaster County

1. John Hubley (March 10, 1777)
2. John Bailey (June 2, 1777)
3. Col. Matthew Smith (May 28, 1778)
4. James Cunningham (January 5, 1781)
5. Samuel John Atlee (October 21, 1783)
6. John Whitehill (December 22, 1784)
7. George Ross (October 16, 1787 – December 21, 1790)

York County

1. Jason Edgar (November 4, 1777)
2. James Ewing (February 9, 1779; withdrew a few days later due to questions regarding his election)
3. Mr. Thompson (March 8, 1779)
4. James Ewing (October 26, 1781)
5. Richard McCallister (McAlister) (October 26, 1784)
6. Andrew Bellmeyer (Billmeyer) (January 19, 1787)
7. Samuel Edie (October 25, 1787 – December 21, 1790)

Cumberland County

1. Jonathan Hoge ( March 4, 1777)
2. James McLene (McClean, M'Lean, McLean) (November 9, 1778)
3. Robert Whitehill (December 28, 1779)
4. John Buyers (Byers) (November 20, 1781)
5. Jonathan Hoge (November 3, 1784)
6. Frederick Watt (October 26, 1787 – December 21, 1790)

Berks County

1. Jacob Morgan (September 3, 1777)
2. James Read (July 1, 1778)
3. Sebastian Levan (October 31, 1781)
4. Charles Biddle (October 30, 1784)
5. James Read (October 13, 1787 – December 21, 1790)

Northampton County

1. George Taylor (March 4, 1777)
2. Jacob Arndt (Orndt) (November 8, 1777)
3. John VanCampen (November 4, 1780)
4. Stephen Balliot(Balliet) (November 3, 1783)
5. Robert Trail (October 23, 1786)
6. Jonas Hartzell (October 20, 1789 – December 21, 1790)

Bedford County

1. Thomas Urie (November 14, 1777)
2. John Piper (November 17, 1780)
3. Isaac Meason (Mason) (November 12, 1783)
4. seat vacant approximately one year due to election irregularities
5. George Woods (November 1, 1787)
6. James Martin (November 12, 1789 – December 21, 1790)

Northumberland County

1. Capt. John Hambright (Hambidght) (November 4, 1777)
2. Brig. Gen. James Potter (November 16, 1780)
3. John Boyd (November 25, 1783)
4. William McClay (October 23, 1786)
5. William Wilson (October 23, 1789 – December 21, 1790)

Westmoreland County

1. John Proctor (March 4, 1777)
2. Thomas Scott (November 29, 1777)
3. Christopher Hayes (February 17, 1781)
4. Bernard Dougherty (November 11, 1783)
5. John Baird (Beard) (November 17, 1786)
6. William Findley (November 25, 1789 – December 21, 1790)

Washington County (erected 1781)

1. Dorsey (Dorset) Pentecost (November 19, 1781)
2. Gen. John Neville (November 11, 1783)
3. David Redick (November 20, 1786)
4. Henry Taylor (December 3, 1789 – December 21, 1790)

Fayette County (erected 1783)

1. John Woods (November 6, 1784)
2. John Smilie (November 2, 1786)
3. Nathaniel Breading (November 19, 1789 – December 21, 1790)

Franklin County (erected 1784)

1. James McLene (February 2, 1785)
2. Abraham Smith (October 24, 1787 – December 21, 1790)

Montgomery County (erected 1784)

1. Daniel Hiester (October 15, 1784)
2. Peter Muhlenberg (October 24, 1785)
3. Zebulon Potts (October 16, 1788 – December 21, 1790)

Dauphin County (erected 1785)

1. William Brown (November 14, 1785)
2. Christopher Kucher (November 1, 1787 – December 21, 1790)

Luzerne County (erected 1786)

1. Col. Nathan Denison, Jr. (March 2, 1787)
2. Lord Butler (October 30, 1789 – December 21, 1790)

Huntingdon County (erected 1787)

1. John Cannon (November 21, 1787)
2. Benjamin Elliott (December 30, 1789 – December 21, 1790)

Allegheny County (erected 1788)

1. Dr. John Wilkins Jr. (November 20, 1789 – December 21, 1790)

== 1790 Constitution ==
A constitutional convention was called in 1789 and a new state constitution was adopted the following year. The 1790 Constitution did away with the Supreme Executive Council and vested supreme executive power in the office of governor. On December 21, 1790 Thomas Mifflin, the last President of Pennsylvania, took office as the state's first governor. (The title of governor had been used during the Colonial era, although it referred to the appointed representative of the monarch or the Proprietor, rather than to an elected official.) The executive branch of the state government has been headed by a governor since that time. The 1790 Constitution made no provision for a lieutenant governor. Upon the death or resignation of the governor the office would be assumed by the Speaker of the State Senate. (This position no longer exists.) The office of lieutenant governor was created by the 1873 State Constitution and first occupied (by John Latta) in 1875.

== See also ==
- French Directory, a similar joint-executive arrangement during the French First Republic possibly inspired by the Supreme Executive Council
