= Suicide of R. Budd Dwyer =

1987 public suicide of American politician

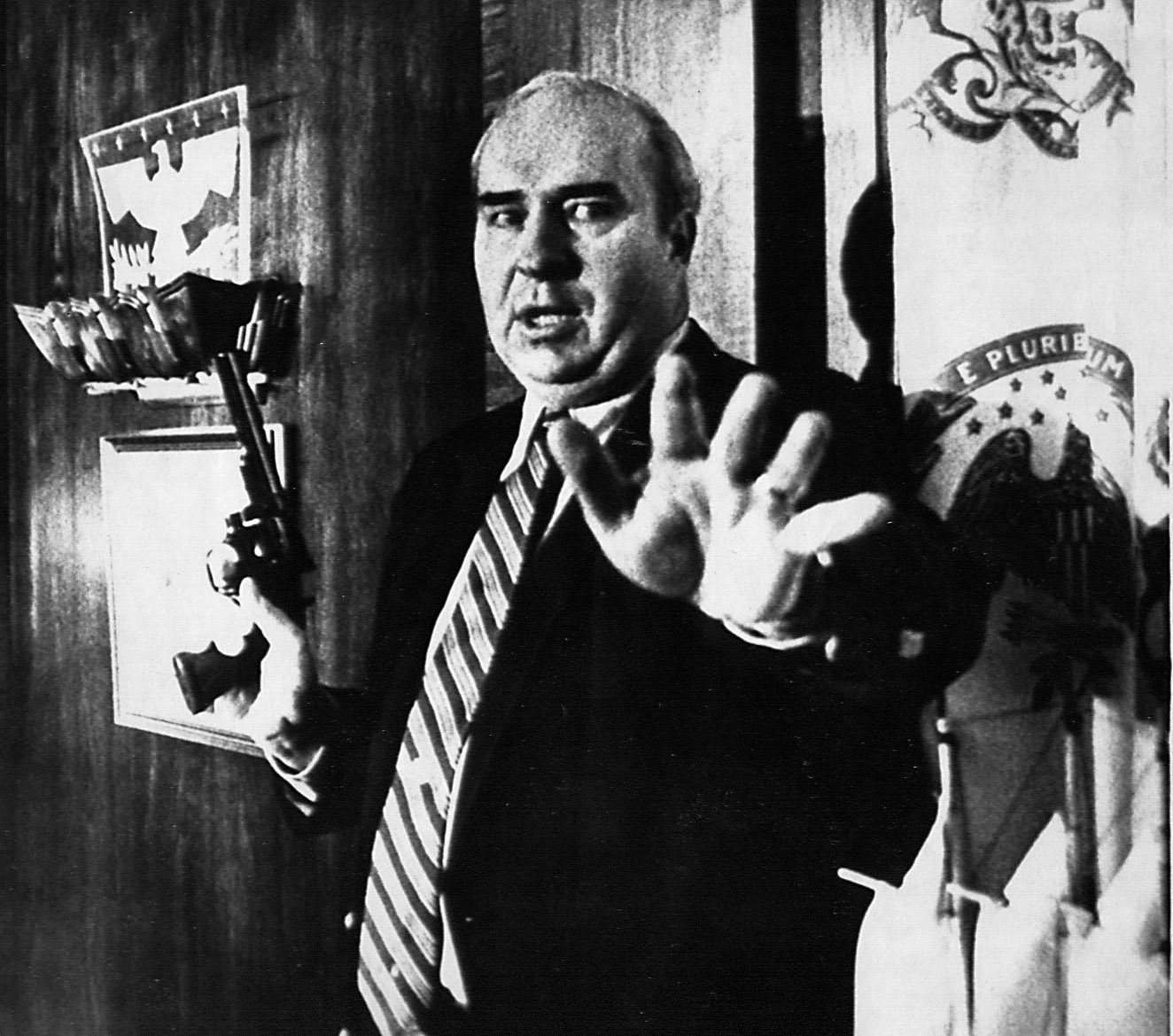
- Dwyer holding a .357 Magnum revolver, seconds before his suicide by shooting himself through the roof of his mouth
- Date: January 22, 1987; 39 years ago
- Time: c. 11:00 a.m. (EST)
- Location: Room 129, Finance Building, Pennsylvania State Capitol Complex, Harrisburg, Pennsylvania, U.S.; 40.26635°N 76.88100°W
- Type: Suicide by gunshot
- Cause: Conviction for accepting a bribe to award a FICA overpayment recovery contract
- Filmed by: Various news outlets
- Outcome: Dwyer's conviction not overturned.; At least one person present developed severe depression as a result.; Wife awarded $1.28 million in death benefits.
- Deaths: 1 (R. Budd Dwyer)
- Burial: Blooming Valley Cemetery

On January 22, 1987, R. Budd Dwyer, the 70th Treasurer of Pennsylvania, committed suicide during a press conference in his office in the Pennsylvania Finance Building in Harrisburg, Pennsylvania, United States. His suicide was broadcast to many television viewers throughout Pennsylvania and the Delaware Valley.

While serving as state treasurer in 1984, Dwyer awarded a $4.6 million contract to data processing company Computer Technology Associates (CTA) to help compensate Pennsylvania employees who overpaid federal taxes because of errors in state withholding. An investigation determined Dwyer accepted a bribe to give CTA the contract over more experienced and less expensive competitors, which would have resulted in Pennsylvania losing $6 million.

In December 1986, he was found guilty on counts of conspiracy, mail fraud, perjury, and interstate transportation in aid of racketeering, and was scheduled to be sentenced on January 23, 1987, facing 55 years in prison and a fine of up to $300,000. The day before his sentencing, Dwyer arranged a press conference in his office in the Pennsylvania Finance Building, where he drew a gun and shot himself in the presence of reporters. His lawyers made posthumous appeals on his behalf, but all were denied, and his convictions were sustained.

== Background ==
=== CTA scandal ===
From 1979 to 1981, before Dwyer was state treasurer, public employees of the Commonwealth of Pennsylvania overpaid millions of dollars in Federal Insurance Contributions Act (FICA) taxes. As a result, the state required an accounting company to determine refunds for its employees. Dwyer awarded the no-bid $4.6 million contract to Computer Technology Associates (CTA), a California-based data processing company, owned by John Torquato Jr., a native of Harrisburg, Pennsylvania, on May 10, 1984.

During early 1984, Dennis Schatzman, deputy comptroller of Pittsburgh Public Schools, noticed financial discrepancies in the CTA contract, and wrote to Pittsburgh school officials regarding these. Schatzman later contacted officials of the accounting company Arthur Young and Associates, who confirmed that the no-bid CTA contract was overpriced by millions of dollars. In June 1984, the Office of the Pennsylvania Auditor General informed the Federal Bureau of Investigation (FBI) of the alleged bribery that occurred during the awarding of the contract.

During late July 1984, Janice R. Kincaid, a former CTA employee, released a sworn statement claiming that Dwyer awarded the contract to CTA because he was promised a $300,000 kickback by the company. Kincaid also indicated that Torquato directed female CTA employees to give sexual favors to potential clients. Torquato was also said to have targeted multiple other state and local officials in Pennsylvania for bribes, including Pennsylvania Attorney General LeRoy Zimmerman.

Dwyer's awarding of the CTA contract was investigated by federal prosecutors. Upon learning of this investigation, Dwyer rescinded the contract with CTA on July 11, 1984. Subsequently, Dwyer repeatedly attempted to stop, divert and forestall the investigation, stating that the U.S. attorney had neither the authority nor evidence to pursue prosecution. Dwyer later admitted to telling his staff to withhold request for proposal (RFP) information from the U.S. attorney and the FBI during the investigation. After being indicted by a federal grand jury, Dwyer was finally charged with agreeing to receive a kickback of $300,000 in return for awarding CTA the contract.

It was revealed at Dwyer's trial that he sought and won approval for special legislation—Act 38 of 1984 (House Bill 1397)—that authorized him to recover the FICA overpayments, and that coded computer tape seized from CTA's office on July 6, 1984, showed that Dwyer was to receive a $300,000 pay-off for awarding CTA the contract. Moreover, Smith and Torquato's claims about Dwyer being bribed were corroborated by four independent and impartial witnesses, and Smith's testimony against Dwyer was virtually identical to written statements Smith made long before entering into a plea agreement. Additionally, FBI agents testified that Dwyer attempted to conceal his involvement with the scheme when, after learning of the FBI investigation, he erased the entry in his appointment book of the March 2, 1984, meeting with Torquato and Smith in which he was first offered a bribe.

=== Conviction ===
On December 18, 1986, Dwyer was found guilty on 11 counts of conspiracy, mail fraud, perjury and interstate transportation in aid of racketeering, and was consequently liable to a sentence of as much as 55 years imprisonment and a $300,000 fine. His sentencing was scheduled for January 23, 1987, to be performed by U.S. District Court.

== Final press conference ==
In a meeting in his home on January 15, 1987, Dwyer discussed the idea of a press conference with his press secretary, James "Duke" Horshock, and Deputy Treasurer, Don Johnson. At the meeting, both Horshock and Johnson cautioned Dwyer not to use the conference to attack the governor, or other individuals involved with his criminal conviction, and both suggested to Dwyer that he should have the conference at a location other than his office. Dwyer angrily rejected their suggestion, but nevertheless assured both men that he would not attack anybody involved with his conviction. He said that he would not announce his resignation at the conference, but rather thank his staff and friends. Both men left assuming Dwyer would ultimately resign at the conference, although Horshock had fears that Dwyer would break his promise.

The next day, Dwyer and his wife, Joanne, visited his lawyer, Paul Killion, who told Dwyer to express repentance for his crimes. Dwyer responded by agreeing to change his version of events, which was to be presented to Judge Muir at Dwyer's pre-sentencing conference scheduled for the afternoon of January 22. During the meeting, Killion became concerned about Dwyer, and confided in Joanne, asking if Dwyer were capable of harming himself, to which Joanne responded by saying that he "loves life too much." Dwyer later saw Killion again, gave him an updated version of events, and stated that he would announce his resignation at the press conference, yet did not want Killion to attend the conference.

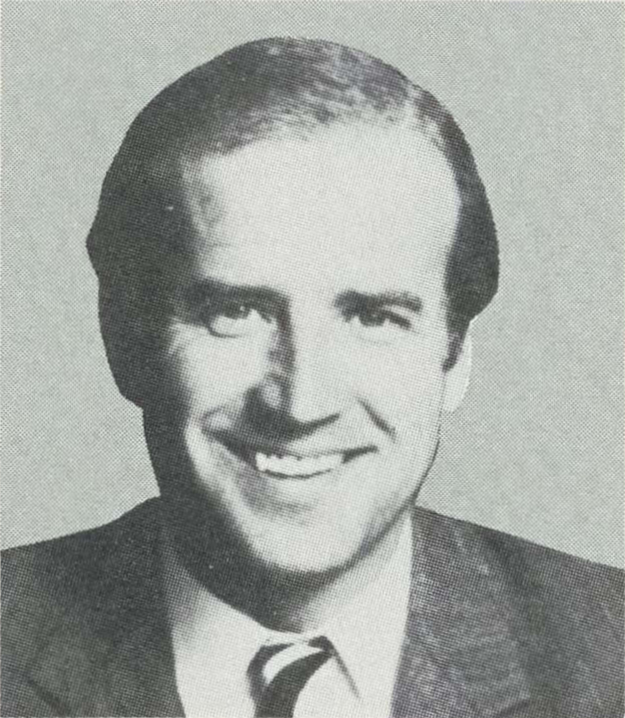
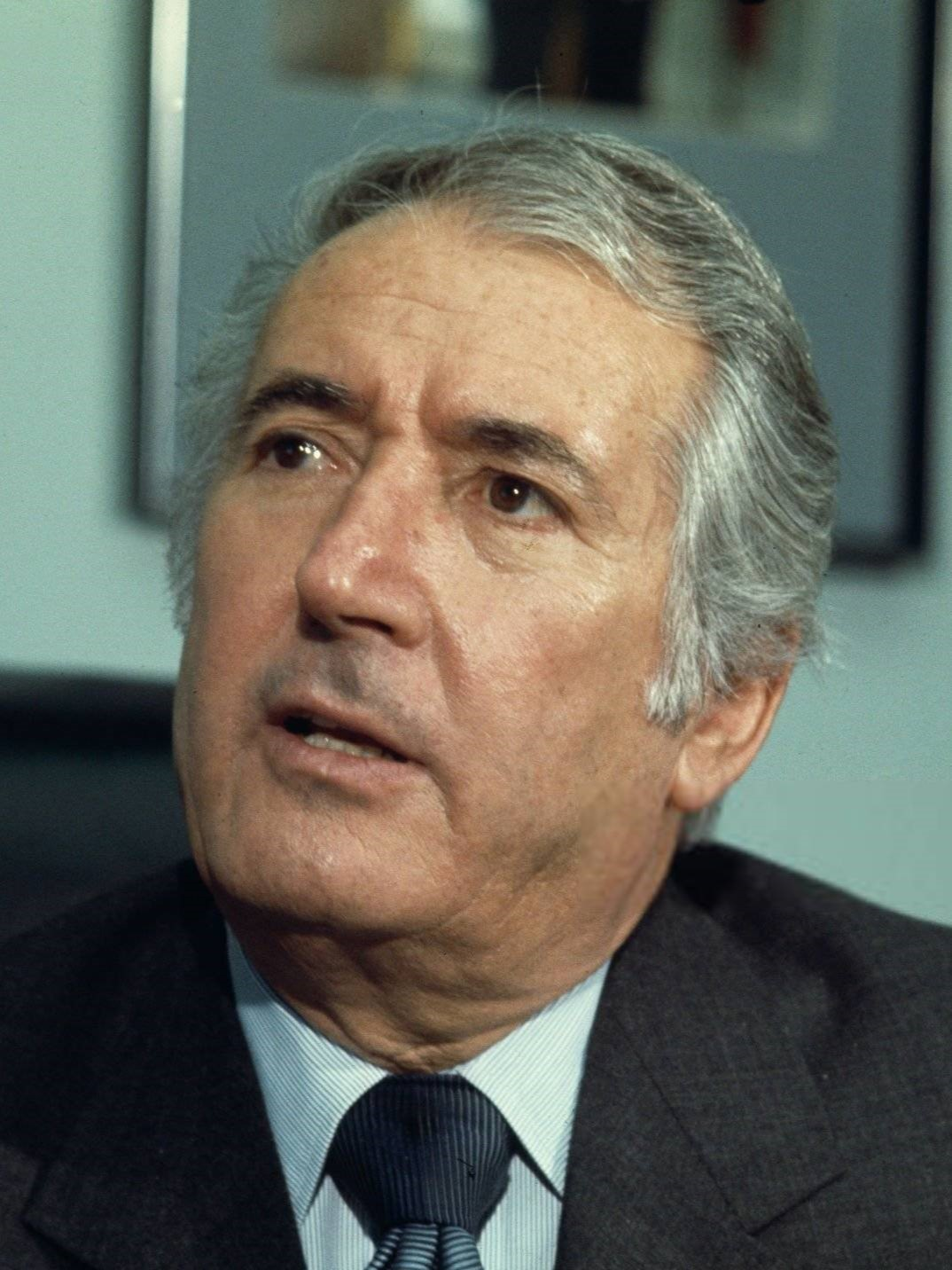
Dwyer sent a letter to then-Senator Joe Biden and Congressman Peter W. Rodino, requesting an investigation into the CTA affair.

On January 20, Dwyer wrote a letter to then-Senator and future U.S. president Joe Biden and Congressman Peter W. Rodino, who were at the time the chairmen of the Senate Judiciary Committee and the House Judiciary Committee respectively, asking them to conduct an investigation into the CTA affair, to reform the justice system in the United States, and if this was not done, to completely remove the word "justice" from everything related to the DOJ. The same day, Dwyer was visited by his personal friends, bail bondsman Harvey Childs and his wife Linda, during which Dwyer claimed that he could not have taken a bribe because he could not have accounted for it, and watched the inauguration of Governor Bob Casey on television, lamenting that he should have been Lieutenant Governor for William Scranton III, the Republican candidate who lost the gubernatorial election to Casey.

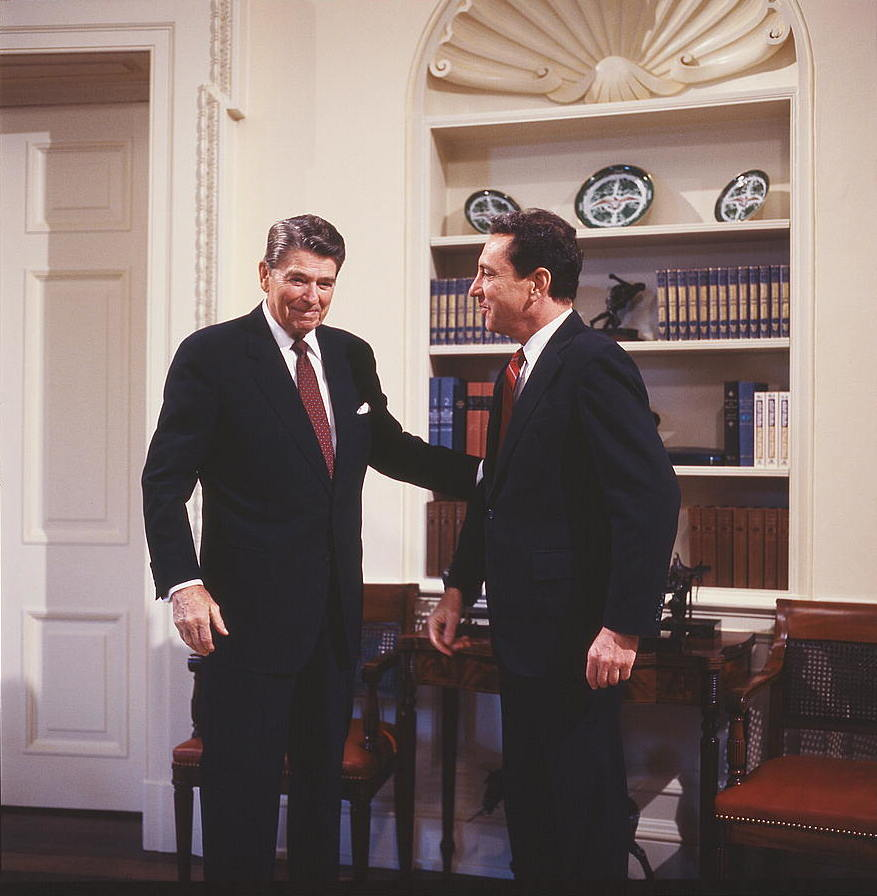
Senator Arlen Specter with President Ronald Reagan in 1986

Dwyer finally reached U.S. Senator Arlen Specter by telephone on January 21, two days before his sentencing. A Specter aide stated that the two of them talked for eight to ten minutes. He then wrote personally to President Ronald Reagan asking for a presidential pardon. In his letter, Dwyer once again professed his innocence and stated that the concept of immediate credit was not understood by the uneducated, unsophisticated "rural" jury at his trial. The senator responded that this request to President Reagan was "not realistic" because the judicial process, including appeals, had not yet finished. On the same day, Dwyer asked his press secretary Horshock and deputy press secretary Gregory Penny to schedule a news conference for the next day without telling them what he was to discuss. Horshock arranged the press conference for 10:30 a.m. EST the next day, January 22. The press secretary summoned dozens of reporters asking them to attend, and told them he did not know its subject.

Dwyer wanted to ban certain reporters from the press conference who he believed wrote biased accounts about him and even suggested that a guard should be in attendance to prevent entry to those who were not on his authorized list. Unconvinced that Dwyer was the victim of a conspiracy, Horshock objected, telling Dwyer he could not "use state government facilities to manipulate the free flow of information". Before the press conference, acting U.S. Attorney West, who had secured the conviction against Dwyer, remarked that a resignation "sounds like the appropriate thing to do under the circumstances. It seems like it would save everybody a lot of time and aggravation." Similarly, Harrisburg Patriot-News reporter Kenn Marshall described the consensus among reporters: they would be attending to see Dwyer announce his resignation from his office. Marshall recalled, "My mission was to stay there until he said those words, then call in a new top for our story." The night before the press conference, Dwyer wrote the following note: "I enjoy being with Jo so much, the next 20 years or so would have been wonderful. Tomorrow is going to be so difficult and I hope I can go through with it."

=== Press statement ===
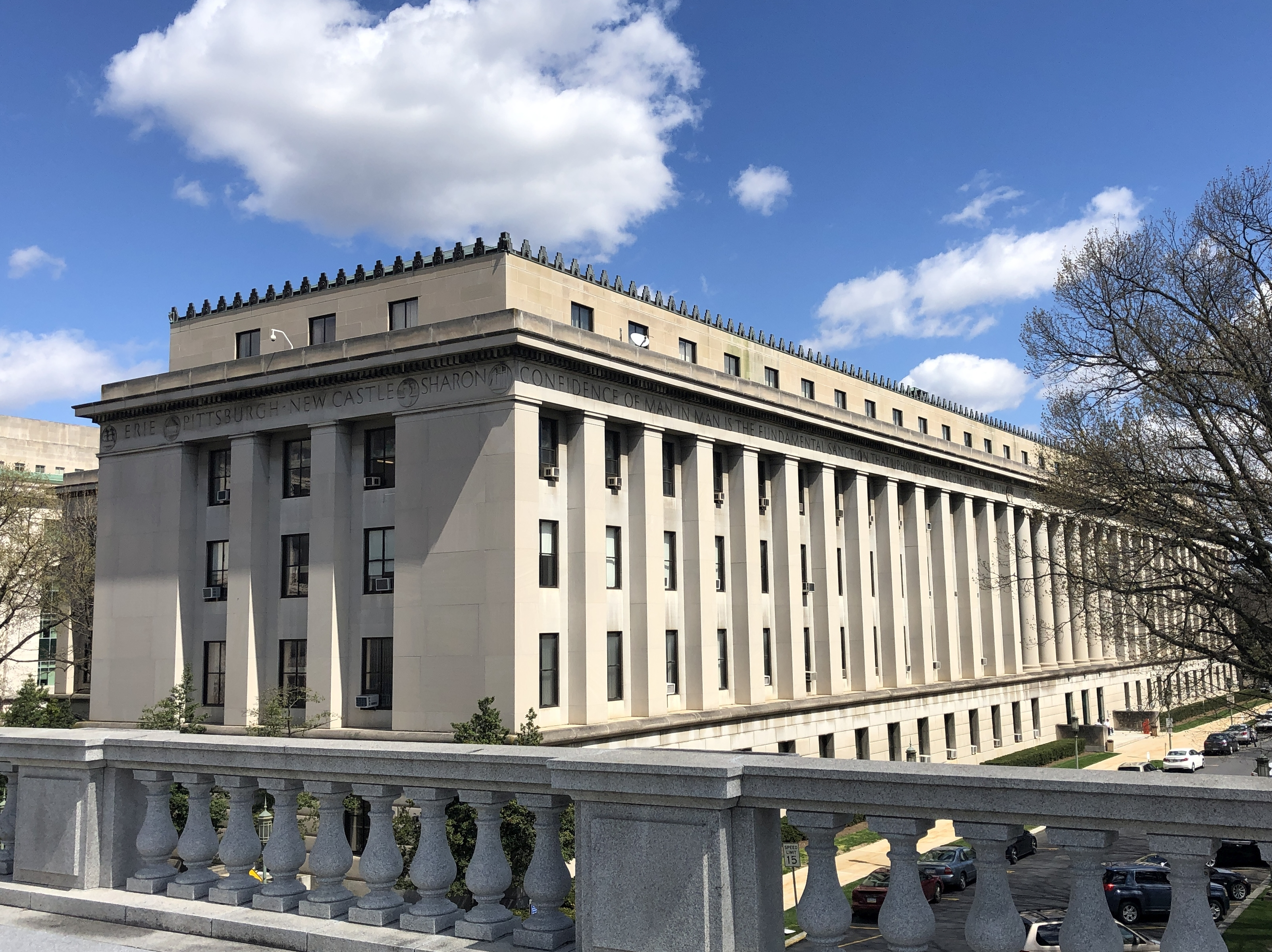
The Pennsylvania Finance Building, where Dwyer held his press conference

The next morning, Dwyer went to his press conference as planned. Standing behind a large wood table that separated him from nine television cameras, four wire service photographers and about 20 television, radio and newspaper reporters, he began reading from a 21-page prepared text, while aides handed a 20-page version to the media. The final page was expected to be his announcement that he would resign from office. Appearing agitated, Dwyer again professed his innocence and accused acting U.S. Attorney James West, FBI agents, U.S. District Court Judge Malcolm Muir, the media and others for abusing the justice system and ruining him. Dwyer alleged that his legal woes were political persecution due to his refusal to grant a travel voucher for Governor Dick Thornburgh's wife for her trip to Europe, alleging that Thornburgh had said that he would "get Dwyer" and that Thornburgh had referred to him as "the fat fuck". Dwyer stated that Attorney West purposely held his trial not in Harrisburg but in Williamsport, due to it being located in Lycoming County, one of the most uneducated counties in Pennsylvania. Dwyer spoke out against the death penalty and expressed regret for voting in favor of it while he was in the Pennsylvania assembly. This speech lasted nearly 30 minutes, and approximately halfway through it, some of the gathered press began to pack and leave. Dwyer spotted this and interrupted himself to say, "Those of you who are putting your cameras away, I think you ought to stay because we're not, we're not finished yet."

Given the sensitive nature of portions of Dwyer's text, press secretary Horshock had considered interrupting him outright to stop him but concluded that he would hold his own press conference after Dwyer's. "I had to make it known that I was not aware of the content of the statement. I didn't want it to be thought that I wrote that for him." Upon reaching the final page of his statement, which had not been distributed to the press nor press secretary Horshock in advance, Dwyer paused. "And I'm on the last page now, and I don't have enough to pass out, but Duke [Horshock], I'll leave this here, and you can make copies for the people; there's a few extra copies here right now." Dwyer continued:

I thank the good Lord for giving me 47 years of exciting challenges, stimulating experiences, many happy occasions and most of all the finest wife and children any man could ever desire.

Now my life has changed for no apparent reason. People who call and write are exasperated and feel helpless. They know I am innocent and want to help, but in this nation, the worlds [sic] greatest democracy, there is nothing they can do to prevent me from being punished for a crime they know I did not commit. Some who have called have said that I am a modern day Job.

Judge Muir is also noted for his medieval sentences. I face a maximum sentence of 55 years in prison and a $300,000 fine for being innocent. Judge Muir has already told the press that he felt "invigorated" when we were found guilty and that he plans to imprison me as a "deterrant" to other public officials. But it wouldn't be a deterrant [sic] because every public official who knows me knows that I am innocent. It wouldn't be legitimate punishment because I've done nothing wrong. Since I'm a victim of political persecution, my prison would simply be an American Gulag.

I ask those that believe in me to continue to extend friendship and prayer to my family, to work untiringly for the creation of a true justice system here in the United States, and to press on with the efforts to vindicate me, so that my family and their future families are not tainted by this injustice that has been perpetrated on me.

We were confident that right and truth would prevail and I would be acquitted and we would devote the rest of our lives working to create a justice system here in the United States. The guilty verdict has strengthened that resolve. But as we've discussed our plans to expose the warts of our legal system[,] people have said, 'Why bother? No one cares, you'll look foolish, 60 Minutes, 20/20, the American Civil Liberties Union, Jack Anderson, and others have been publicizing cases like yours for years and it doesn't bother anyone.'

At this point, Dwyer stopped reading from his prepared remarks, with the gathered press still waiting on his expected resignation. There was still a significant portion of the prepared text remaining, which revealed that he was actually planning to commit suicide. Dwyer did not read the following section aloud:

I've repeatedly said that I'm not going to resign as State Treasurer. After many hours of thought and meditation I've made a decision that should not be an example to anyone because it is unique to my situation. Last May, I told you that after the trial, I would give you the story of the decade. To those of you who are shallow, the events of this morning will be that story. But to those of you with depth and concern the real story will be what I hope and pray results from this morning—in the coming months and years[,] the development of a true justice system here in the United States. I am going to die in office in an effort to ' ... see if the shame[-ful] facts, spread out in all their shame, will not burn through our civic shamelessness and set fire to American pride.' Please tell my story on every radio and television station and in every newspaper and magazine in the U.S. Please leave immediately if you have a weak stomach or mind since I don't want to cause physical or mental distress. Joanne, Rob, DeeDee – I love you! Thank you for making my life so happy. Good bye [sic] to you all on the count of 3. Please make sure that the sacrifice of my life is not in vain.

After deciding to break from his speech, Dwyer called to three of his staffers, giving each a sealed envelope with the insignia of the treasury department. The first envelope, given to Bob Holste, contained a letter addressed to then-Pennsylvania Governor Bob Casey, who had assumed office just two days earlier. The second, given to deputy press secretary Gregory Penny, contained an organ donor card and other related materials. The last, given to Deputy Treasurer Don Johnson, contained materials intended for Dwyer's family, including three letters: one for his wife Joanne, and one for each of his children, Rob and DeeDee (Dyan), and suggested funeral arrangements. Freelance photographer Gary Dwight Miller, one of the reporters in attendance, described the scene at this time, stating: "It was just kind of a long-winded, sad event."

== Suicide ==
Video camera footage of Dwyer's suicide (separated in two parts)

After he had finished speaking and handing out the notes to his staffers, Dwyer grabbed a manila envelope and drew a Model 19 .357 Magnum revolver from it, frightening the gathered crowd. Kenn Marshall, a reporter with The Patriot-News, later stated in an interview that he feared Dwyer would turn the gun on the reporters in attendance. Dwyer backed up against the wall, holding the weapon close to his body, and said, "Please, please leave the room if this will — if this will affect you." Reporters David Morris of the Associated Press, Thom Cole of UPI and Gary Warner of afternoon newspaper The Pittsburgh Press were at the rear of the room, waiting for Dwyer to say he had resigned so they could run down the hall to telephones to tell their editors they could publish pre-written stories and add Dwyer's direct quote. When Dwyer produced the revolver, the three ran into the hallway and shouted to a state police kiosk in the center of the long hallway that the treasurer had a gun.

Several people in the room pleaded with Dwyer to surrender the gun or tried to approach him and seize the weapon. Dwyer warned against either action, saying as his last words: "This will hurt someone, don't do that". Dwyer then killed himself with a single shot through the roof of the mouth, dying instantly. After the shot was fired, press secretary Horshock walked up to the podium and attempted to calm the frenzied crowd. Dwyer's death was recorded by at least five running news cameras. Dwyer was pronounced dead at 11:31 a.m.

Per his status as an organ donor, Dwyer's corneas and ear cartilage were made available for transplant. Dwyer's body was left in the room for several hours as law enforcement conducted an investigation into whether or not any of Dwyer's aides had assisted him in his suicide, ultimately concluding they had not. By the time his body was recovered, it had been too long since his death for any other organs to be usable. He was interred at Blooming Valley Cemetery in Saegertown on January 26.

== Aftermath and legacy ==
=== Graphic footage and effect on witnesses ===
Many television stations throughout Pennsylvania broadcast taped footage of Dwyer's suicide to a midday audience. Philadelphia station WPVI-TV showed Dwyer pulling the trigger and falling backwards, but did not show the bullet path. It chose not to show the gunshot a second time. During the next several hours, news editors had to decide how much of the explicit footage they wanted to broadcast. Many chose not to broadcast the final moments of the suicide.

Many stations, including KYW-TV and WCAU-TV in Philadelphia and KDKA-TV in Pittsburgh, stopped the action just before the gunshot. However, the last two allowed the audio of the shooting to continue with the stopped image. Westinghouse Broadcasting (then-parent of KYW-TV and KDKA-TV) news cameraman William L. Martin and reporter David Sollenberger had a camera set up at the conference; they chose to broadcast the audio with a freeze-frame of the gun in Dwyer's mouth. Only a handful broadcast the unedited press conference. WPVI-TV rebroadcast the suicide footage in full on their 5:00 p.m. and 6:00 p.m. Action News broadcast without warning the viewers. That station's broadcast is a source for copies available on the Internet. WPXI in Pittsburgh is reported by the Associated Press to have broadcast the footage uncensored on an early newscast. In explaining the decision to broadcast, WPXI operations manager By Williams said, "It's an important event [about] an important man." Williams avoided broadcasting the footage in the evening newscasts, explaining, "Everyone knows by then that [Dwyer] did it. There are children out of school." However, in central Pennsylvania, many children were home from school during the day of Dwyer's suicide due to a snowstorm. The moment of Dwyer's suicide did not appear on any national newscast. NBC Nightly News and CNN's coverage only showed Dwyer holding the gun and stopped before he placed it in his mouth, and CBS Evening News and ABC World News Tonight did not include any footage from the press conference in their reports.

At least one reporter present at Dwyer's suicide suffered from being a witness; radio reporter Tony Romeo, who was standing a few feet from Dwyer, developed severe depression due to Dwyer's suicide. Romeo had to receive counseling and left journalism for several months, stating "I was a snowball down a hill of bad thoughts".

WGAL reporter and U.S. Army veteran Gene Schenck, who witnessed Dwyer's suicide, said the following of the event:

"It was a terrible event. The kind of thing I never want to see again in my life. The Capitol press corps, a tough bunch of reporters, was devastated. Everybody's in shock. Reporters, who normally would compete with each other all day long to get a story, are walking around the Capitol newsroom asking each other, 'Are you alright? Are you alright?' It's just the kind of thing you don't expect. Everybody's blaming himself for not trying to stop it. There are a few of us who picked up some clues during the news conference that something like this may have happened, and a lot of us now feel a little guilty that we didn't try to stop it. It was a shocking event. I don't know what else to say."

=== Dwyer's letter to Casey ===
The letter Dwyer sent Casey stated, "By the time you receive this letter ... the office of State Treasurer of Pennsylvania will be vacant. I stress to you that I did not resign but was State Treasurer of Pennsylvania to the end." It also stated that Casey "will be the great Governor that Pennsylvania needs at this time in our history." He suggested his wife Joanne as his successor, describing her as "very talented, personable, organized and hard-working." Governor Casey did not accept Dwyer's suggestion. Regardless of the events of January 22, the governor and legislature of Pennsylvania already expected Dwyer to either resign or be dismissed from office. As such, a deal had already been brokered wherein the next treasurer, a Democrat, would serve the remnant of Dwyer's term and resign at its end. This was G. Davis Greene Jr., who was appointed as the 71st Treasurer of Pennsylvania on January 23, 1987, the day after Dwyer's suicide.

=== Associated Press complete switch to color film ===
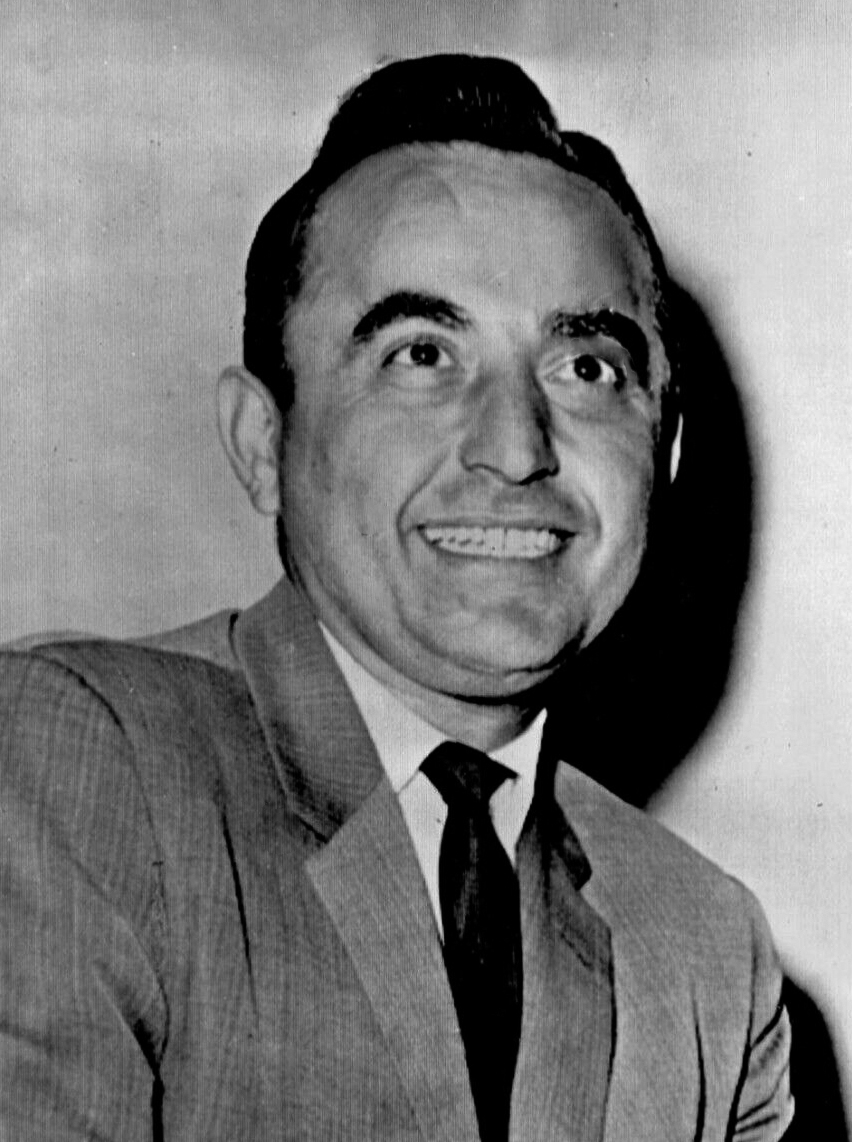
Pulitzer Prize-winning photographer Paul Vathis (pictured in 1962) attended the press conference. His photographs of the suicide were in black-and-white, causing the Associated Press to require its photographers to switch to color film completely.

Prior to Dwyer's suicide, Associated Press photographers would choose between color or black-and-white film to use on assignments, usually reserving color film for important assignments and using black-and-white film on regular assignments. Paul Vathis, an AP photographer who took four photographs of Dwyer's suicide, had believed he was covering a routine assignment and only had black-and-white film. After Dwyer's suicide, the Associated Press switched to using color film on all assignments.

=== Responses ===
Dwyer's mistrust of the Republican former Governor Dick Thornburgh, who had left office two days prior to Dwyer's suicide, was expressed in detail in his press conference statement. The timing of Dwyer's press conference and suicide meant that Thornburgh was not empowered to appoint a Treasurer to replace him. Instead, this became the responsibility of Thornburgh's successor, Democrat Bob Casey, who had assumed office on January 20.

In his final press statement, Dwyer alleged that Governor Thornburgh along with prosecutor James West, engaged in a political vendetta against him, and that FBI agents had acted improperly in their investigation. After Dwyer's public suicide, the National Association of State Treasurers requested that Dwyer's allegations be reviewed by the Department of Justice. After a thorough investigation, the Justice Department's Office of Professional Responsibility exonerated attorney James West and everyone else involved in Dwyer's investigation and prosecution of any wrongdoing. The FBI also investigated Dwyer's claims regarding impropriety on behalf of FBI personnel. They ultimately found Dwyer's claims to be "lacking in substance and specificity" and warranting no further action. R.B. Swift, former Capitol reporter, noted that Dwyer's allegations were extensively investigated by journalists from both The Philadelphia Inquirer and the Associated Press, but no evidence was found to substantiate them. In 2010, former U.S. attorney James West, who prosecuted Dwyer, affirmed Dwyer's guilt, stating that "the evidence against Dwyer was overwhelming and indisputable".

Dwyer claimed that Governor Thornburgh sought revenge against him due to his prior criticism of Thornburgh's perceived mishandling of state resources. In response, Thornburgh pointed out that prior to their European visit, the Thornburgh family had issued a press release specifically stating that Ginny Thornburgh would pay her own expenses. Upon their return to Pennsylvania, Mrs. Thornburgh "repeatedly requested" the Thornburgh staff to "advise her of the amount" to be reimbursed; however, Dwyer leaked this matter to The Philadelphia Inquirer in an attempt to "enhance his own image by embarrassing" Thornburgh and his family. Regarding the use of the state police, Thornburgh stated that "the security detail provided its services to all members of our household as the officers deemed necessary for our protection. We neither asked for nor questioned these services, which were no different than those provided to our predecessors."

Thornburgh spokesman David Runkel dismissed Dwyer's allegations as being "paranoic", as did John Taylor, the former spokesman for Governor Bob Casey. Pennsylvanian journalist and author Brad Bumsted suggested that Dwyer's allegations against Thornburgh may have been an attempt to divert attention from his own criminal activity with CTA. Bumsted also stated that, in Dwyer's final press statement, Dwyer "offered no real evidence" that there was any conspiracy against him. Dwyer's deputy press secretary Gregory Penny, who was handed an envelope by Dwyer at Dwyer's final press conference, stated that he was convinced that Dwyer, whom he had once defended, had been guilty all along, stating:

Some of the individuals Budd associated with and surrounded himself; the reluctance to provide information to his press office when we tried to respond to reporters' questions during that time; the pleading of the 5th Amendment during Budd's trial by his top aide [Mark Phenicie]; Budd's decision not to take the stand in his own defense during the trial; and Budd's decision to take his life rather than go to prison and continue fighting to prove his innocence — these are the things I thought about and that brought me to conclude that Budd was not innocent.

=== Death benefits ===
Since Dwyer died in office, his widow Joanne collected full survivor benefits totaling more than $1.28 million (equivalent to about $3.63 million in 2025), which at the time was the largest death benefit payment ever made by the Pennsylvania Municipal Retirement System. If Dwyer had been sentenced, state law would have prohibited the payment of his state-provided pension benefits. A spokesman for Dwyer suggested that he may have killed himself to preserve the pension benefits for his family, whose finances had been ruined by legal defense costs. Other statements made by some friends and family also suggest that this was Dwyer's motivation. At a panel discussion for the documentary Honest Man: The Life of R. Budd Dwyer, Dwyer's sister Mary Kun stated that Dwyer had made the decision to kill himself prior to knowing he would lose his pension and thus his motivation for his suicide was not to provide financial assurance for his family but rather to "sacrifice himself to help the system".

=== Posthumous appeals ===
On January 27, 1987, Dwyer's lawyers filed an appeal in the U.S. District Court for the Middle District of Pennsylvania seeking the dismissal of all post-trial motions that were then pending against Dwyer, abatement of Dwyer's conviction and the dismissal of his May 13, 1986, indictment. On March 5, 1987, the district court denied all motions, stating that "there were no grounds whatsoever upon which Mr. Dwyer could hope to succeed upon appeal" and ordered to "close this file as to R. Budd Dwyer". Dwyer's lawyers appealed this decision, and the U.S. Court of Appeals for the Third Circuit subsequently vacated the judgment. On remand, the district court was instructed to dismiss Dwyer's motions (since the Court lacked subject matter jurisdiction), and Dwyer's convictions for mail fraud and conspiracy were sustained. Six years after Dwyer's death, efforts were made to exonerate Dwyer when a retrial request was filed in U.S. District Court in July 1993. This request was denied in October of the same year.

=== People involved ===
In the years following the case, William Trickett Smith Sr., the main witness against Dwyer, would be convicted in multiple other criminal cases. He was convicted of theft by unlawful taking and deception in 2010, of arson and insurance fraud in 2012, and in 2014 was convicted for a plot to have his son, William Trickett Smith II, extradited from Peru to the United States so he could break him out of prison. Smith II had been convicted of murdering his Peruvian wife. Dwyer's co-defendant, Robert B. Asher, would later serve as a member of the Republican National Committee from Pennsylvania, serving from 1998 to 2020. Asher was slated to be a signatory in the plot to overturn the 2020 United States presidential election in favor of Donald Trump by submitting fake electoral votes, but was replaced before he did.

== Misinformation and conspiracy theories ==
Following Dwyer's death, various conspiracy theories alleged that his prosecution was politically motivated or that key witness William Trickett Smith gave false testimony in exchange for leniency. Judicial and academic reviews consistently rejected these claims, concluding that Dwyer's conviction rested on extensive documentary and testimonial evidence demonstrating his knowing role in the bribery scheme.

The 2010 documentary Honest Man: The Life of R. Budd Dwyer revived long‑standing allegations that Smith altered his testimony under government pressure after being offered a plea bargain. Critics have argued that the film omits essential context regarding Smith's testimony and misrepresents the sequence of events. Smith was tried separately in 1985, one year before Dwyer's 1986 trial. During his own trial, Smith initially denied offering Dwyer a bribe, claiming instead that his co‑defendant John Torquato Jr. made the offer. However, after prosecutors presented him with prior statements, supporting documents, and the threat of perjury and extended sentencing, including possible charges against his wife, Smith admitted that he had, in fact, offered Dwyer a bribe, which Dwyer knowingly accepted. His testimony at Dwyer's later trial was consistent with that admission.

Court records show that Smith ultimately testified to promising a $300,000 bribe to Dwyer in exchange for awarding a no‑bid contract to CTA. His account was corroborated by other witnesses, audit and procurement records showing irregular contract awards, and electronic evidence from CTA's data systems.

The prosecution's case did not rely solely on Smith's word. Expert witnesses identified inflated pricing and manipulated bid specifications, while financial tracings linked intermediary accounts to Dwyer's associates. Internal correspondence showed Dwyer using his office to conceal procurement irregularities and justify awarding the contract. The Third Circuit Court of Appeals found no evidence of misconduct by the prosecution or false testimony, and upheld the verdict in full.

Subsequent reviews by the Department of Justice's Office of Professional Responsibility and the FBI similarly found no evidence of political interference or investigative impropriety. Contemporary analysts widely described the evidence of guilt as overwhelming. Former U.S. Attorney James West later remarked that "every material fact was corroborated; no element rested solely on the word of a single witness."

== In popular culture ==
- The 1993 mondo film Traces of Death includes full footage of Dwyer's suicide in the final segment.
- Marilyn Manson's debut single "Get Your Gunn" (1994) samples audio of Dwyer's suicide.
- The 1995 song "Hey Man Nice Shot" by rock band Filter is about Dwyer's suicide.
- The 1999 album Volume 1 by Pennsylvania rock band CKY initially featured an artistic depiction of Dwyer's suicide. When the band later signed with Volcom, the album art was changed as the label found the graphic to be too offensive.
- The deathcore band Fit For An Autopsy has a song titled "Thank You Budd Dwyer," written about Dwyer and his suicide on their 2013 album Hellbound. The song criticizes the justice system, believing Dwyer to have been wrongly accused.
- The 2006 American drama film Loren Cass shows footage of Dwyer's suicide.
- In 2014, rap duo $uicideboy$ used a photograph of the event for their cover of their EP KILL YOURSELF PART 3: The Budd Dwyer Saga. By the same time, the duo member Scott Arceneaux Jr. adopted Dwyer’s name as a stage name for his production credits.
- In 2005, in an episode of Back to Norm, Norm Macdonald staged a dark comedic parody of Dwyer's death, ending a mock farewell by producing a handgun and cutting to black while a gunshot is heard.

== See also ==
- Suicide of Christine Chubbuck
- Suicide of Daniel Jones
- Suicide of Malevo Ferreyra
