= Malcolm Muir (judge) =

American judge (1914–2011)

Senior Judge of the United States District Court for the Middle District of Pennsylvania
- In office August 31, 1984 – July 22, 2011

Judge of the United States District Court for the Middle District of Pennsylvania
- In office October 14, 1970 – August 31, 1984
- Appointed by: Richard Nixon
- Preceded by: Seat established by 84 Stat. 294
- Succeeded by: Edwin Michael Kosik

Personal details
- Born: Malcolm Muir; October 20, 1914 Englewood, New Jersey, U.S.
- Died: July 22, 2011 (aged 96) Williamsport, Pennsylvania, U.S.
- Education: Lehigh University (B.A.); Harvard Law School (LL.B.)

Malcolm Muir (October 20, 1914 – July 22, 2011) was a United States district judge of the United States District Court for the Middle District of Pennsylvania.

== Education and career ==
Born in Englewood, New Jersey, Muir received a Bachelor of Arts degree from Lehigh University in 1935 and a Bachelor of Laws from Harvard Law School in 1938. He was in private practice in Williamsport, Pennsylvania, from 1938 to 1942. He served in the United States Navy during World War II, from 1942 to 1945, achieving the rank of lieutenant. Afterwards he returned to private practice in Williamsport until 1970.

== Federal judicial service ==
On September 28, 1970, Muir was nominated by President Richard Nixon to a new seat on the United States District Court for the Middle District of Pennsylvania created by 84 Stat. 294. He was confirmed by the United States Senate on October 8, 1970, and received his commission six days later. He assumed senior status on August 31, 1984, serving in that status until his death.

== Notable cases ==
Muir presided over the trials of the conspirators in the CTA scandal, including R. Budd Dwyer, the then-Treasurer of Pennsylvania who was convicted in December 1986 of 11 counts of conspiracy, mail fraud, perjury and interstate transportation in aid of racketeering; Dwyer was scheduled to be sentenced by Muir on those charges on January 23, 1987. Dwyer scheduled a press conference for the day before, January 22, where after stating his innocence, he killed himself in front of the gathered members of the media and his staff. He faced a possible sentence of up to 55 years' imprisonment and a $300,000 fine. Muir also presided over the cases of Robert B. Asher, William Trickett Smith, and CTA owner John Torquato Jr. in connection with the CTA case.

Muir also presided over the racketeering trial of Al Benedict, the former Pennsylvania Auditor General and Democratic nominee for state treasurer in 1984, coincidentally Dwyer's opponent in that election. Benedict was convicted and was sentenced by Muir to six years in prison, of which Benedict served two.

== Death ==
On July 22, 2011, Muir died in Williamsport, Pennsylvania at the age of 96.

== Sources ==
Legal offices
| Preceded by Seat established by 84 Stat. 294 | Judge of the United States District Court for the Middle District of Pennsylvania; 1970–1984 | Succeeded by Edwin Michael Kosik |
