= William T. Smith (disambiguation) =

William T. Smith (1916–2010) was an American farmer and politician from New York. William T. Smith may also refer to:

- William Trickett Smith (1937–2021), American lawyer who was disbarred
- William Trickett Smith II (born 1981), his son, American drug trafficker convicted of murdering his wife in Peru in 2007
- William Thomas Smith (1896–1994), World War I flying ace
- William Tyler Smith (1815–1873), English obstetrician, medical writer and journalist
- William T. "Wee Willie" Smith (1911–1992), American professional basketball player

== See also ==
- William Thompson Russell Smith (1812–1896), Scottish-American painter
- William Twigg-Smith (1883–1950), New Zealand artist
