= Trickett =

Trickett is a surname. Notable people with the surname include:

- Anthony Trickett (1940–2013), Scottish doctor
- Clint Trickett (born 1991), American football player
- Edward Trickett (1851–1916), Australian rower
- Jon Trickett (born 1950), English politician
- Libby Trickett (née Lenton) (born 1985), Australian swimmer
- Luke Trickett, swimmer
- Rachel Trickett (1923–1999), English novelist and academic
- Sam Trickett (born 1986), English poker player
- Vicki Trickett (born 1938), American actress
- William Trickett (1843–1916), Australian politician

== See also ==
- Daniel Trickett-Smith (born 1995), English footballer
- Mount Trickett, a mountain on the Great Dividing Range
- Trickett & Webb, London-based graphic design agency
- Trickett's Cross, an estate situated on the outskirts of Ferndown, Dorset, England
- William Trickett Smith (born 1938), chairman of the Dauphin County Republican Committee
- William Trickett Smith II (born 1981), American murderer
