= 1980 Pennsylvania State Treasurer election =

1980 Pennsylvania Treasurer election
- November 4, 1980
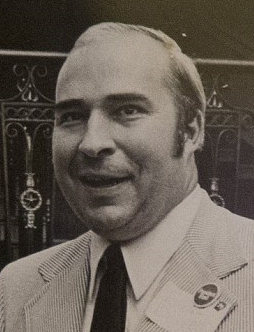

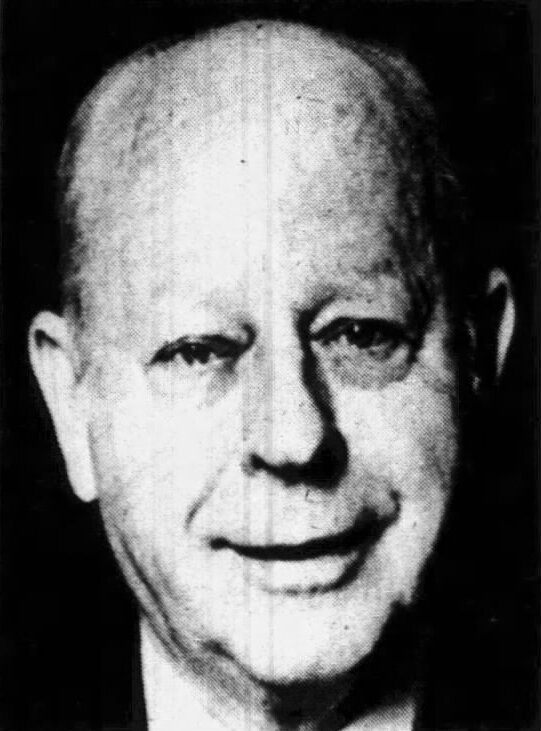
Nominee	R. Budd Dwyer	Robert E. Casey
Party	Republican	Democratic
Popular vote	2,055,199	2,003,126
Percentage	49.43%	48.18%
- County results Dwyer: 40–50% 50–60% 60–70% Casey: 40–50% 50–60% 60–70%
Treasurer before election
Robert E. Casey
Democratic
Elected Treasurer
R. Budd Dwyer
Republican

The Pennsylvania State Treasurer election was held on November 4, 1980. Democratic incumbent Robert E. Casey lost re-election to Republican candidate R. Budd Dwyer by a margin of 1.25%. Casey had won election to the office in 1976 due in large part to his similar name to Robert P. Casey. In 1980, Dwyer's supporters chanted, "Casey's not Casey" to remind voters his opponent was not Robert P. Casey. A reporting error in Lebanon County by the Associated Press led many to incorrectly believe Casey had defeated Dwyer until it was later corrected.

== Democratic nomination ==
Incumbent Robert E. Casey won re-nomination. He received the endorsement of the Democratic state committee and defeated a single primary challenger, Olga O. Woodward.

== Republican nomination ==
The Republican Party nominated State Senator R. Budd Dwyer.

== General election ==
1980 Pennsylvania State Treasurer election
Party	Candidate	Votes	%
Republican	R. Budd Dwyer	2,055,199	49.43%
Democratic	Robert E. Casey	2,003,126	48.18%
Consumer	Thelma R. Hambright	43,801	1.05%
Libertarian	Frank W. Bubb III	31,573	0.76%
Socialist Workers	Tory A. Dunn	23,879	0.57%
Total votes		4,157,578	100.0
Republican gain from Democratic			
