= Robert Asher =

Robert Asher could refer to:

- Robert Asher (director) (1915–1979), British film and television director
- Robert B. Asher (born 1937), American political figure from Pennsylvania
- Bob Asher (American football) (born 1948), American football player
