= Dennis Schatzman =

American journalist and politician (1950–1997)

- Born: Dennis Clyde Schatzman; February 6, 1950; Pittsburgh, Pennsylvania, U.S.
- Died: July 16, 1997 (aged 47); Upland, California, U.S.

Dennis Clyde Schatzman (February 6, 1950 – July 16, 1997) was an American journalist and politician who received national attention for his coverage of the 1995 murder trial of O. J. Simpson for the Los Angeles Sentinel.

== Biography ==
Dennis Clyde Schatzman was born on February 6, 1950, in Pittsburgh, Pennsylvania, grew up in the city's predominantly Black Lincoln–Lemington neighborhood, and attended Peabody High School. He was of African American and German Jewish descent; his paternal grandfather was a German immigrant who married a Black woman in Pittsburgh. In 1972, he graduated from the University of Pittsburgh, where he spent many hours at the library reading old issues of the Pittsburgh Courier, one of the nation's leading African American newspapers, on microfilm.

Schatzman began his career as a journalist at the Baltimore Afro-American. He later became the public relations director for the Maryland Commission on Human Relations. While in Maryland, he ran to be a delegate for Jimmy Carter at the 1976 Democratic National Convention. He left Baltimore "in a huff" over the commission's failure to get the developers of the Inner Harbor project to hire minorities.

Returning to Pittsburgh, Schatzman was hired in the public relations department of Carnegie Mellon University. In 1978, he was appointed city editor of the New Pittsburgh Courier, a revived version of the former African American newspaper. He was placed on leave of absence after a car accident seriously injured his leg in July 1980.

In 1981, Schatzman ran to become district justice in Pittsburgh's 13th ward, covering the predominantly Black Homewood neighborhood. After the incumbent in that seat was defeated in the May primary election, Schatzman ran unopposed and was elected in November. As a lay judge, Schatzman said he was the first in the city to seriously enforce the local laws against truancy. He stepped down after two years, later saying that the neighborhood position left him spending too much time trying petty offenses committed by people he'd grown up with.

City controller Thomas E. Flaherty admired Schatzman's reformist attitude and appointed him in 1984 as deputy controller of Pittsburgh Public Schools. Shortly after taking the job, Schatzman noticed financial discrepancies in a statewide contract that had recently been awarded to John Torquato Jr.'s company Computer Technology Associates to distribute refunds to public school employees who had overpaid on their Federal Insurance Contributions Act (FICA) taxes. At first, Schatzman's complaints were ignored by his supervisors, but he and William Johnson, a friend who ran a rival computer company, insisted on making further inquiries. An investigation discovered that Torquato had bribed Pennsylvania state treasurer R. Budd Dwyer to get the contract. Torquato was sentenced to four years in federal prison, while Dwyer committed public suicide before he could be sentenced. Schatzman alleged that Dwyer's "people looked at me with venom and said, 'That's the nigger'" at a press conference in 1984, and that he faced further racial abuse after Dwyer's death, but said he felt "nothing but grief" upon learning of the suicide.

In 1986, Schatzman left Pittsburgh for Washington, D.C., where he was appointed as the first full-time executive director of the National Association of Black Journalists. He spent seven months in the role before stepping down. He subsequently moved to North Carolina, where he became executive director of the State Conference of the NAACP and managing editor of the Winston-Salem Chronicle. Schatzman later said that through these experiences, "I learned I wasn't an administrator", and he returned to Washington to begin working as a freelance journalist.

On November 17, 1990, Schatzman was shot in the back while leaving a telephone booth on Georgia Avenue. He lost a lung, and his medical bills after the shooting cost about $39,000 (equivalent to $96,000 in 2025). A friend, Washington Post columnist William Raspberry, wrote a column about Schatzman's plight, which raised enough money to cover the bills. Schatzman then spent the next six months searching for the man who had shot him. He would later tell Jeffrey Toobin of The New Yorker that he encountered the culprit on May 5, 1991, "busted two slugs in his ass", and then fled the city on a Greyhound bus to Los Angeles. Some who knew Schatzman questioned whether he was telling the truth about shooting the man, and police in Washington could not confirm that the second shooting had ever happened.

Arriving in Los Angeles, Schatzman started his career over, taking a job as a proofreader at the Los Angeles Sentinel. By the time of the 1992 Los Angeles riots, he had returned to his former status as a journalist. Schatzman's Sentinel coverage of the trial of the police officers who beat Rodney King, and of the ensuing riots after they were acquitted, were compiled alongside others' reports in two anthologies: Inside the LA Riots: What Really Happened and Why It Will Happen Again and California Dreams and Realities.

From the beginning of the murder trial of O. J. Simpson, Schatzman's front-page stories in the Sentinel questioned the Los Angeles Police Department's treatment of Simpson, as well as the mainstream media coverage which treated him as the prime suspect to the exclusion of other possibilities. His reporting was widely syndicated by the African American newspapers of the National Newspaper Publishers Association. After Simpson was acquitted, Schatzman was credited as having been one of the few journalists to anticipate the not-guilty verdict, as he had described flaws in the prosecution's argument better than most. Schatzman co-authored a 1996 book, The Simpson Trial in Black and White, with Tom Elias, another reporter who had followed the case.

Despite the success of his reporting, Schatzman was fired from the Sentinel in 1995. Friends of Schatzman said the newspaper's management likely resented his popularity, while others claimed that his work habits had been erratic. He then became a professor of journalism at California State University, Fullerton.

At the time he was covering the Simpson trial, Schatzman was suffering from stomach cancer, which he predicted would soon kill him. On July 16, 1997, Schatzman died at his home in Upland, California, after a severe asthma attack compounded by the lung problems he had suffered ever since he was shot. O. J. Simpson was a pallbearer at his funeral.

Schatzman is a recurring character in The People v. O. J. Simpson: American Crime Story, a fictionalized 2016 television miniseries based on Toobin's writings about the trial. He is portrayed by Leonard Roberts.
