= Edwin Michael Kosik =

American judge (1925–2019)

Senior Judge of the United States District Court for the Middle District of Pennsylvania
- In office July 15, 1996 – June 13, 2019

Judge of the United States District Court for the Middle District of Pennsylvania
- In office June 16, 1986 – July 15, 1996
- Appointed by: Ronald Reagan
- Preceded by: Malcolm Muir
- Succeeded by: Yvette Kane

Personal details
- Born: May 5, 1925 Dupont, Pennsylvania
- Died: June 13, 2019 (aged 94) Wilkes-Barre, Pennsylvania
- Education: Wilkes College (B.A.); Dickinson School of Law (LL.B.)

Edwin Michael Kosik (May 5, 1925 – June 13, 2019) was a United States district judge of the United States District Court for the Middle District of Pennsylvania.

== Education and career ==
Kosik was born in Dupont, Pennsylvania. He received a Bachelor of Arts degree from Wilkes College in 1949. He received a Bachelor of Laws from Dickinson School of Law in 1951. He was a Corporal in the United States Army from 1943 to 1946 and a Reserve Colonel in 1975. He was in private practice in Scranton, Pennsylvania, from 1951 to 1953, became an Assistant United States Attorney of the Middle District of Pennsylvania from 1953 to 1958, before returning to private practice from 1958 to 1969. He was a Chairman of the Pennsylvania State Workmen's Compensation Board from 1964 to 1969 and became a judge of the Court of Common Pleas for the 45th Judicial District of Pennsylvania from 1969 to 1979. He became the president judge of the Court of Common Pleas of the 45th Judicial District of Pennsylvania from 1979 to 1986.

== Federal judicial service ==
Kosik was nominated by President Ronald Reagan on May 14, 1986, to a seat vacated by Judge Malcolm A. Muir on the United States District Court for the Middle District of Pennsylvania. He was confirmed by the United States Senate on June 13, 1986, and received his commission on June 16, 1986. He assumed senior status on July 15, 1996. He was best known for presiding over the "Kids for Cash scandal" corruption case, where he rejected the plea deals of two fellow judges and, after their convictions, imposing lengthy prison sentences on them. Kosik moved to inactive senior status in February 2017 due to health issues at age 91, meaning that he would no longer hear cases or participate in the business of the court. A month later, he was the subject of a widely publicized missing-person search. He was found alive in a wooded area after two days. He died on June 13, 2019, aged 94.

Legal offices
Preceded by Malcolm Muir	Judge of the United States District Court for the Middle District of Pennsylvania; 1986–1996	Succeeded by Yvette Kane
