= 1984 Pennsylvania State Treasurer election =

- November 6, 1984
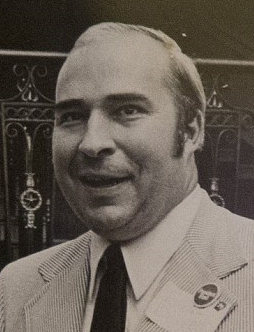

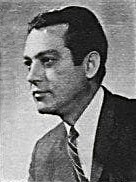
Nominee	R. Budd Dwyer	Al Benedict
Party	Republican	Democratic
Popular vote	2,348,977	2,040,693
Percentage	51.78%	44.99%
- County results Dwyer: 40–50% 50–60% 60–70% 70–80% Benedict: 40–50% 50–60% 60–70%
Treasurer before election
R. Budd Dwyer
Republican
Elected Treasurer
R. Budd Dwyer
Republican

The 1984 Pennsylvania State Treasurer election took place on November 6, 1984, to elect the Treasurer of Pennsylvania.

In the midst of a scandal, which included allegations of bribes, sexual favors and a secret Swiss bank account, incumbent Republican Treasurer R. Budd Dwyer won re-election to a second term, defeating Democratic nominee and Auditor General Al Benedict.

In the years following the election, both Dwyer and Benedict would be convicted on federal corruption charges. Benedict was convicted of racketeering and tax fraud charges and was sentenced to six years in prison, serving two years, while Dwyer was convicted of bribery charges, but committed suicide during a press conference before he was sentenced.

== Republican primary ==
=== Nominee ===
- R. Budd Dwyer, incumbent Treasurer.

=== Results ===
April 10, 1984 Republican primary
Party	Candidate	Votes	%
Republican	R. Budd Dwyer (incumbent)	578,063	100.00%
Total votes		578,063	100.00%

== Democratic primary ==
=== Candidates ===
==== Nominee ====
- Al Benedict, incumbent Auditor General.

==== Eliminated in primary ====
- Catherine B. Knoll, candidate for this office in 1976.
- Arline Lotman, Montgomery County lawyer.
- Michael Jackson, Beaver County Prothonotary.
- Al Smith, York County industrial designer/consultant.

=== Results ===
April 10, 1984 Democratic primary
Party	Candidate	Votes	%
Democratic	Al Benedict	363,432	31.32%
Democratic	Catherine B. Knoll	349,011	30.08%
Democratic	Arline Lotman	218,364	18.82%
Democratic	Michael Jackson	131,517	11.34%
Democratic	Al Smith	97,894	8.44%
Total votes		1,160,218	100.00%

== General election ==
=== Results ===
1984 Pennsylvania State Treasurer election
Party	Candidate	Votes	%
Republican	R. Budd Dwyer	2,348,977	51.78%
Democratic	Al Benedict	2,040,693	44.99%
Consumer	Priscilla L. Thomas	115,905	2.56%
Libertarian	Ralph Mullinger	30,496	0.67%
Total votes		4,536,071	100.00%
Republican hold			
