= Crónica TV =

Crónica Televisión
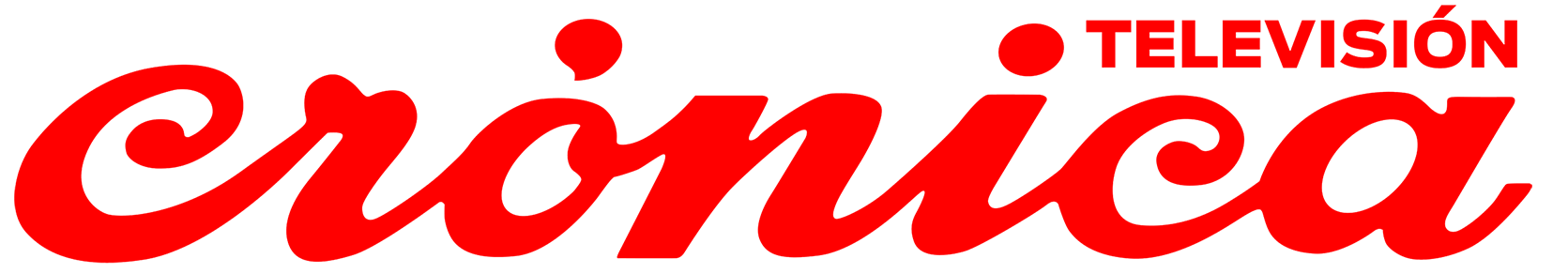
- Country: Argentina
- Broadcast area: Argentina; International
- Headquarters: Buenos Aires, Argentina

Programming
- Language: Spanish

Ownership
- Owner: Héctor Ricardo Garcia
- Sister channels: Canal CM

History
- Launched: 3 January 1994; 32 years ago

Links
- Website: www.cronica.com.ar/cronica-en-vivo (watch live)

Crónica Televisión, also known as Crónica HD, is an Argentine news channel focused on live news reports. It is operated by Estrellas Producciones S.A. (Estrella Satelital) and owned by Héctor Ricardo García.

== History ==
Rossana González and Gustavo Chapur led the initial broadcast of Crónica TV on 3 January 1994, and it became the first Argentine TV channel to broadcast 24 hours of news and live reports.

For the past 10 years the channel has been the leader in ratings, beating Todo Noticias also in coverage and breaking news.

The channel is well known in Argentina for its populist character and its bizarre treatment of information. Its trademark is the use of red screens and big white letters to announce breaking news, accompanied by the US military march "The Stars And Stripes Forever".

== Controversy ==
=== "Malevo" Ferreyra suicide ===
On 21 November 2008 the channel entered controversy, after being witnesses to and broadcasting "live" the suicide of Mario Oscar "Malevo" Ferreyra, an ex-officer of the Tucumán Police Department who was presumed to be a serial killer. This occurred some minutes before Ferreya was to be transported by the Argentine National Gendarmerie to a trial. This was the first time that a suicide was broadcast live on Argentine television.

=== Apu image controversy ===
On 30 November 2018, Crónica came under fire for displaying an image of The Simpsons character Apu Nahasapeemapetilon while reporting on the arrival of Indian Prime Minister Narendra Modi to Buenos Aires for the G20 summit.

=== Firing of Diego Moranzoni ===
On May 25, 2025, Diego Moranzoni, one of the channel's hosts, was fired after being accused of misappropriating funds raised from a charity fundraiser. The news has been widely reported by other media outlets.

The channel issued an official statement confirming Moranzoni's dismissal, although no specific details were revealed regarding the amount of money involved or the internal investigation process.
