= Robert E. Casey =

American politician (1909–1982)

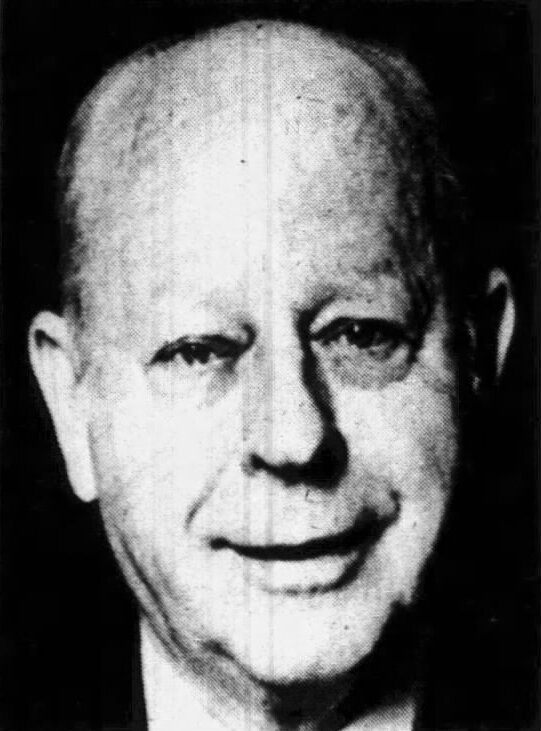
- Casey, c. 1976

69th Treasurer of Pennsylvania
- In office 1977 – January 20, 1981
- Governor: Milton Shapp; Dick Thornburgh
- Preceded by: Grace M. Sloan
- Succeeded by: R. Budd Dwyer

Personal details
- Born: March 30, 1909 Gallitzin, Pennsylvania, U.S.
- Died: December 1, 1982 (aged 73) Odessa, Texas, U.S.
- Education: University of Pittsburgh at Johnstown
- Occupation: Politician

Robert E. Casey (March 30, 1909 – December 1, 1982) was an American politician who served as Pennsylvania State Treasurer from 1977 to 1981. A Democrat from Johnstown, Pennsylvania, he served four terms as Cambria County recorder of deeds. No relation to then Pennsylvania Auditor General and future-Pennsylvania Governor Robert P. Casey Sr., his electoral victory in 1976 was largely due to his name resemblance. He was defeated for re-election in 1980 by Republican challenger R. Budd Dwyer.

== Life and career ==
The youngest of eleven children of an Irish-American coal miner, Casey was born in Gallitzin, Pennsylvania. He graduated from Johnstown Catholic High School and studied accounting at the University of Pittsburgh at Johnstown. He worked at the state treasury department for seven years in the 1930s and then at a bank and mortgage and loan company in Johnstown. In 1956, he became deputy register of wills for Cambria County and served as Cambria's recorder of deeds from 1963 to 1976.

While he had never ran for statewide elected office until 1976, Casey held numerous community and civic roles out of the public eye. He served as president of the Pennsylvania State Association of Recorders of Deeds and twice as president of the Pennsylvania State Association of Elected Officials. He had also served three years on the board of directors of the National Association of County Recorders and was appointed to a state commission to improve counties' record-keeping.

== State treasurer ==
During the 1976 election, Casey benefited from his name's similarity to popular outgoing Pennsylvania Auditor General Robert P. Casey Sr. (no relation). Johnny Durbin, a Harrisburg bar owner, encouraged Casey to run for treasurer after Robert P. Casey opted not to seek elected office in 1976. Casey barely campaigned, paid for only one newspaper advertisement, and spent exactly $866 to defeat party favorite Catherine Baker Knoll in the Democratic primary. He went on to win the general election, easily defeating the Republican nominee, state representative Patricia Crawford. His widest victory margin was in Lackawanna County, the home county of Robert P. Casey. The latter complained that the new treasurer was "an unwitting, undeserving beneficiary" of Robert P.'s name recognition, adding, "Frankly, I don't like being used."

Casey rewarded Durbin by appointing him to serve as deputy treasurer and a senior campaign aide. He launched a new investment program for state funds and purchased a $1 million computer to facilitate electronic record keeping. Casey lost his 1980 reelection bid to Republican nominee R. Budd Dwyer. In 1982, he announced plans to seek the Democratic nomination for lieutenant governor but withdrew from the race. He was a Knight of Columbus and board member of the local American Red Cross.

== Personal life ==
Casey was married to the former Mary Studeny, with whom he had three daughters: Doris, Mary Lou, and Karen. His wife and children survived him.

He died of a heart attack while vacationing in Odessa, Texas, on December 1, 1982.

== See also ==
- Dick Cheney (New Mexico politician)

Party political offices
Preceded by Grace M. Sloan	Democratic nominee for Treasurer of Pennsylvania; 1976, 1980	Succeeded by Al Benedict
