= 1976 Pennsylvania State Treasurer election =

1976 Pennsylvania Treasurer election
- November 2, 1976
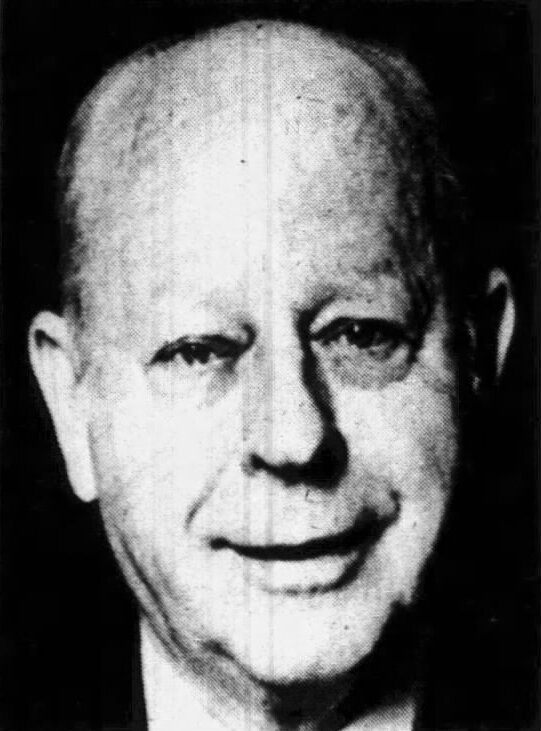

Nominee	Robert E. Casey	Patricia A. Crawford
Party	Democratic	Republican
Popular vote	2,276,636	2,022,412
Percentage	52.45%	46.59%
- County results Casey: 50–60% 60–70% Crawford: 40–50% 50–60% 60–70%
Treasurer before election
Grace M. Sloan
Democratic
Elected Treasurer
Robert E. Casey
Democratic

The Pennsylvania State Treasurer election was held on November 2, 1976. Democrat Robert E. Casey defeated Republican Patricia A. Crawford by a margin of 5.86%. Casey defeated Catherine Baker Knoll in the Democratic primary by a margin of 11.51%.

Casey's victory was due in large part to his similar name to then State Auditor General Robert P. Casey. Robert E. Casey was serving as Recorder of Deeds for Cambria County when he decided to run for office at the suggestion of a bar owner, just hours after Robert P. Casey announced he would not run for any office in 1976.

== Democratic nomination ==
Democratic primary results
Party	Candidate	Votes	%
Democratic	Robert E. Casey	455,932	41.64%
Democratic	Catherine Baker Knoll	329,902	30.13%
Democratic	Joseph F. Smith	134,131	12.25%
Democratic	Barbara Altemus	97,740	8.93%
Democratic	Albert Elko	77,356	7.06%
Total votes		1,095,061	100.0%

== Republican nomination ==
Republican primary results
Party	Candidate	Votes	%
Republican	Patricia A. Crawford	557,691	72.11%
Republican	Joseph Cicippio	215,685	27.89%
Total votes		773,376	100.0%

== General election ==
1976 Pennsylvania State Treasurer election
Party	Candidate	Votes	%
Democratic	Robert E. Casey	2,276,636	52.45%
Republican	Patricia A. Crawford	2,022,412	46.59%
Constitution	Frederick C. Siegle	29,490	0.68%
U.S. Labor	Robin F. Taub	11,774	0.27%
Independent	Write-ins	141	0.00%
Total votes		4,340,453	100.0
Democratic hold			
