= William Trickett Smith II =

American drug trafficker and murderer (born 1981)

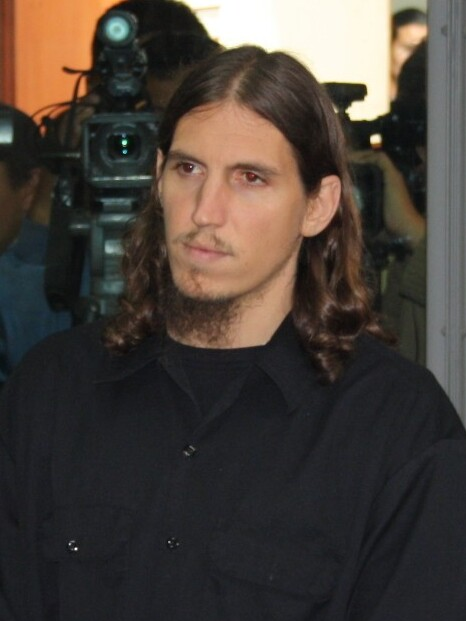
- Smith in court in Lima, 2011
- Born: William Trickett Smith Jr. 18 January 1981 (age 45); Pennsylvania, U.S.
- Other name: "The Suitcase Murderer"
- Spouse: Jana Claudia Gómez Menéndez (March 2007 – died July 2007)
- Children: 1 son (born c. 1999)
- Parent: William Trickett Smith Sr.
- Status: Incarcerated
- Convictions: Drug trafficking (2000); Escape, eluding arrest (2004); Murder (2011)
- Penalty: Sentenced to 35 years in prison

Details
- Victims: Jana Claudia Gómez Menéndez
- Date: July 2007
- Killed: 1

William Trickett Smith II (or Jr.) (born January 18, 1981) is an American murderer from Paxtang, Pennsylvania who pleaded guilty to murdering his Peruvian wife, Jana Claudia Gómez Menéndez de Smith of Trujillo, Peru. Gómez Menéndez was reported missing and was found in a suitcase that washed up on a beach near the capital city of Lima the day after the 2007 Peru earthquake. Her body was identified by a tattoo of a butterfly on her neck. The homicide investigation became known in Peru as "The Mystery of the Butterfly".

On May 23, 2011, Smith was sentenced to 35 years in prison for the murder of his wife.

== Background ==
Smith is the son of William Trickett Smith Sr., former chairman of the Dauphin County Republican Committee, who was disbarred and imprisoned in 1985 for bid rigging in the CTA scandal, the same scandal that led to the bribery conviction and public suicide of Pennsylvania State Treasurer R. Budd Dwyer in 1987. His father was also convicted of theft by unlawful taking and deception in 2010.

In 2000, the younger Smith was sentenced to two to four years imprisonment for drug trafficking stemming from an arrest with two other men in a vehicle that contained cocaine and marijuana that had been packaged for sale, along with cash and handguns. While still under parole for the previous offense, Smith was convicted in 2004 of escape and eluding arrest after fleeing a vehicle that had been stopped by police. He was sentenced to four years of indeterminate punishment, of which he served nine months in prison.

The younger Smith also has a son, born around 1999.

== Murder of Jana Claudia Gómez Menéndez ==
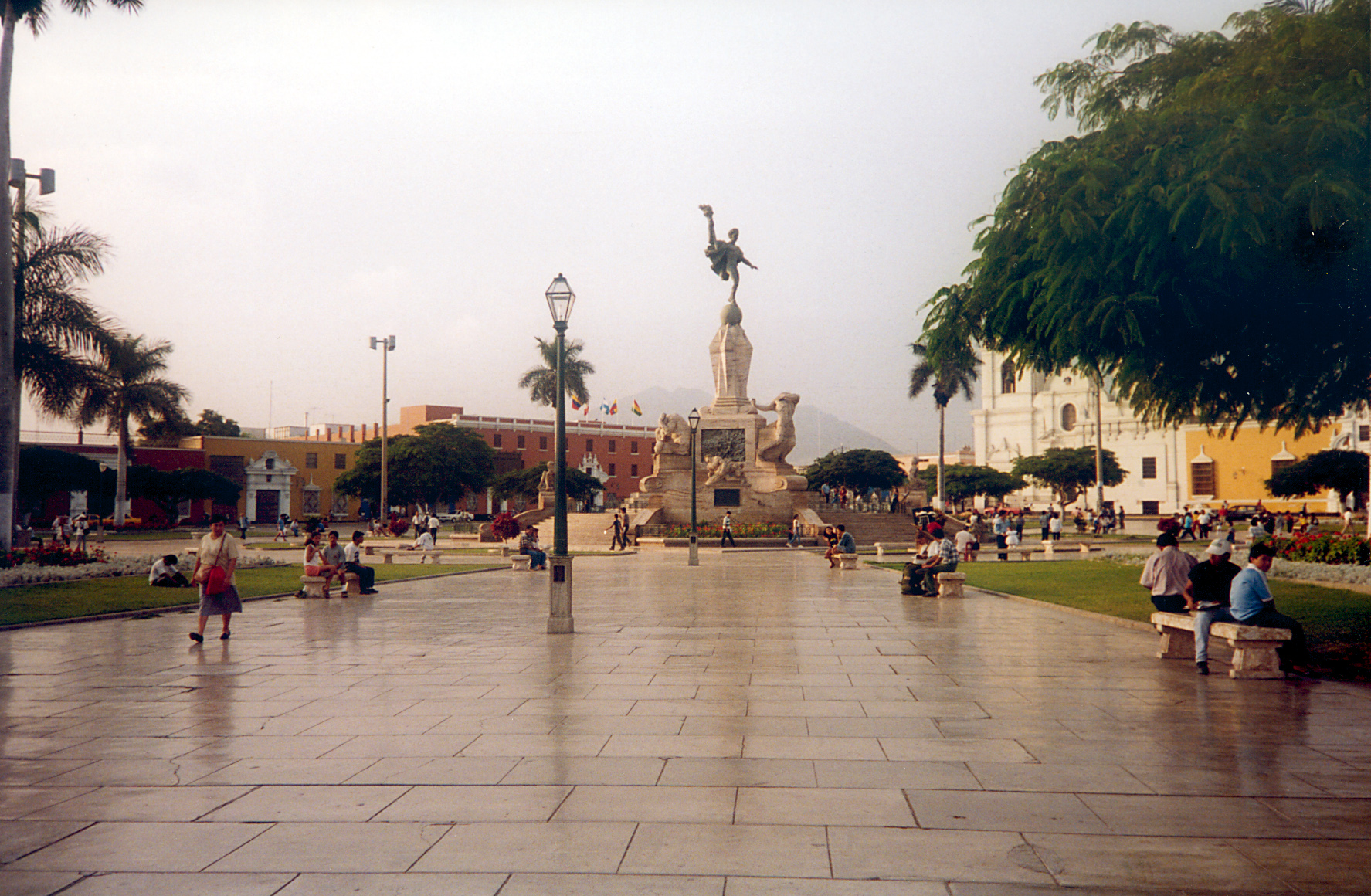
Smith briefly lived with his wife's family in Trujillo, Peru.

Smith met Jana Claudia Gómez Menéndez through the internet chat room Match.com in 2006. Her father José Gómez is a prison guard in Peru. The two were married on March 1, 2007, at her hometown of Trujillo, Peru, and lived there for some time with her parents. On July 4, 2007, Gómez Menéndez told her mother that she planned to meet Smith in the capital city of Lima. She traveled to Lima on the next day to meet him at the San Remo Hotel. Smith called the parents of Gómez Menéndez from the United States on July 11. When her family said that they thought she was with him, he allegedly denied that he had been in Peru at that time. Gómez Menéndez was reported missing by her family on July 26. Smith returned to Peru from the United States on July 31 to assist in the search for Gómez Menéndez. When her mother Patricia Menéndez noticed that Smith had Jana's diary, he allegedly responded that he must have mistakenly taken it back with him to the United States.

On August 16, the day after the 2007 Peru earthquake, the dismembered body of Gómez Menéndez was discovered by fishermen in a large blue suitcase that washed up on a beach at the Barranco District of Lima. Smith left the country on the same day. Police believe that the suitcase, which was found attached to thick green cords, had been kept submerged by a weight and broke free by the force of the quake; the epicenter was located in the ocean 150 kilometers (93 mi) south of Lima. Patricia Menéndez identified her daughter's partially decomposed remains by a butterfly tattoo on the back of the neck and vowed to seek justice. The case attracted widespread attention in Peru and became known as "El Enigma de la Mariposa" ("The Mystery of the Butterfly").

We feel destroyed, confused.

— José Gómez, father of Jana Claudia Gómez Menéndez

=== Investigation ===
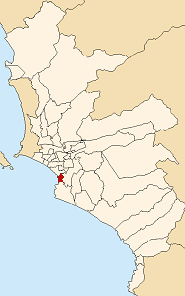
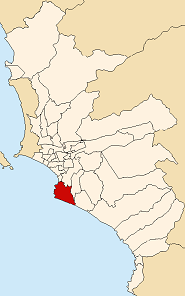
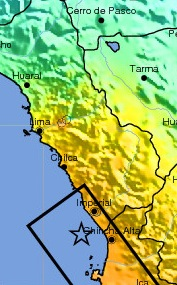
Maps of the Lima districts of Barranco (left), where the body of Gómez Menéndez was found in a suitcase, and Chorrillos (center), where Smith allegedly rented a boat to dump a suitcase of a matching description into the ocean. The star on the map at the right denotes the epicenter of the 2007 Peru earthquake, which was located 150 kilometers (93 mi) south of Lima.

San Remo Hotel employees told investigators that Smith was seen leaving the premises with a suitcase that matched the description of the one in which the body of Gómez Menéndez was found. Police obtained emails from March 2007 in which Smith allegedly asked Monica Cecilia Muñoz Pereda, a student at the Universidad de Lima, where he could obtain a drug to put a person to sleep and how to find a boat that would not require a lot of "paper work". In other emails, Smith offered to pay double to rent the boat anonymously at night and asked about how the police handled missing person reports in Peru.

Lead investigator Manuel Leon contacted Muñoz in Italy, where she had moved to study. She returned to Peru to discuss the case with police at her parents' urging and was not permitted to leave the country for the duration of the investigation. According to Muñoz, she met Smith on the internet in February 2007 and broke off their "intimate relationship" after discovering that Smith was already involved with another woman, but remained friends. Muñoz told police that on July 8, days after Gómez Menéndez was last seen by her family, Smith asked her to join him on a 7 p.m. boat ride from the Chorrillos District of Lima. Smith was allegedly carrying a large dark blue suitcase which he said contained "some old documents and papers" for a business associate. Muñoz said that Smith sealed the suitcase with duct tape at her apartment and threw it overboard 15 minutes into the boat ride. When Muñoz told Smith that he should not dump trash in the ocean, he allegedly responded that it was an American business tradition: "When we want to forget about something, we throw it in the ocean."

Peruvian public prosecutor Rafael Aguero Pinto charged that Smith killed Gómez Menéndez in the hotel, stuffed her body into the suitcase, and dumped the suitcase from a boat into the ocean with the assistance of two accomplices. Smith's one-time attorney Don Bailey called the claims "ridiculous", but Peruvian police considered the gathered evidence sufficient to begin proceedings to extradite Smith from the United States. Lead investigator Leon said that the investigation would proceed carefully to ensure that Smith would face trial in Peru.

=== Arrest and extradition ===
Smith was arrested on August 24, 2007, and sent to the Dauphin County Jail for traveling to Peru 11 times without informing his parole officer. A search warrant of a home in Paxtang, where Smith lived with his father, found various belongings from Gómez Menéndez, including cut and torn clothing, sneakers containing sand, and her photo identification. On September 20, Judge Joseph H. Kleinfelter re-sentenced Smith to two to six years in prison for parole violations. He had been transferred to the Pennsylvania State Correctional Institution at Coal Township when the U.S. Attorney's office for the Federal District of Middle Pennsylvania received an extradition request from Peru in January 2008 under a "mutual legal assistance treaty" with the United States. According to the extradition documents, after Smith married Gómez Menéndez in 2007, he became controlling and choked her until she became unconscious during an argument. The documents also alleged that Smith had Muñoz pose as his wife in July 2007 to cancel Gómez Menéndez's mobile phone service through Nextel Communications.

In April 2008, the parents of Gómez Menéndez identified their daughter's belongings, which also included a leather handbag, that had been retrieved from Smith's home and transferred by U.S. authorities to a police station in Lima. In November 2008, Peruvian president Alan García Pérez signed the documents seeking the transfer of Smith from United States custody.

U.S. Magistrate J. Andrew Smyser ruled on July 14, 2009, that enough evidence was presented to try Smith in Peru. On September 17, 2009, U.S. District Judge James M. Munley delayed Smith's extradition back to Peru after public defender James Wade filed an emergency petition for a writ of habeas corpus. However, Judge Munley denied the appeal on October 23, 2009.

On August 12, 2010, Smith was extradited via Hartsfield-Jackson International Airport at Atlanta, Georgia to Jorge Chávez International Airport near Lima, Peru on Delta Air Lines flight 151 while escorted by Interpol agents. After a medical examination and a visit by a representative of the U.S. embassy, Smith was transported under heavy security while wearing a bulletproof vest. A news reporter observed that Smith appeared emaciated.

=== Incarceration and media coverage ===
Smith has been called "El Asesino de la Maleta" ("The Suitcase Murderer") by the Peruvian media. He was held at Miguel Castro Castro prison in San Juan de Lurigancho, Lima while awaiting trial. He was placed in protective custody in a separate wing away from the general prison population.

On August 23, 2010, the Office of Internal Affairs began administrative and disciplinary action when Peruvian television network América Televisión aired a picture of Smith and two other inmates that had been taken with official photographic equipment at Miguel Castro Castro prison. The photo included Smith, Colombian hitman Hugo Trujillo Ospina, accused of the contract killing of Peruvian entrepreneur Myriam Fefer, and Dutch suspect Joran van der Sloot, accused of robbing and killing Stephany Tatiana Flores Ramírez. Smith and Van der Sloot have been referred to by local media as "the foreigners accused of the most talked-about assassinations in our country."

=== Prosecution and sentence ===
Prosecutor Rafael Aguero Pinto sought prison terms of eight years for boat captain Justo Solano, 15 years for alleged accomplice Mónica Muñoz Pereda, and the maximum sentence of 35 years for Smith. There is no death penalty in Peru for civilian criminal cases.

On May 19, 2011, Smith pleaded guilty to the murder of his wife. On May 23, he was sentenced to 35 years in prison. Smith has appealed his sentence. In October 2011 both the boat captain Justo Solano and the alleged accomplice Mónica Muñoz Pereda were found innocent in a Peruvian courtroom.

== See also ==
- Peru – United States relations
