= Malevo Ferreyra =

Argentine police chief and murderer (1945–2008)

- Born: Mario Oscar Ferreyra; June 17, 1945; Cruz Alta Department, Tucumán, Argentina
- Died: November 21, 2008 (aged 63); San Andrés, Tucumán, Argentina
- Cause of death: Suicide by gunshot
- Other name: Malevo
- Occupation: Police officer
- Spouse: María de los Ángeles Núñez
- Status: Deceased
- Conviction: Murder (1993)
- Criminal charge: Human rights violations (2008)

Details
- Victims: José Menéndez; Hugo Vera; Ricardo Andrada
- Date: October 10, 1991 (Laguna de Robles triple murder)
- Span of crimes: Potentially the 1970s – 1994
- Killed: 3+

Mario Oscar Ferreyra, better known as Malevo Ferreyra (June 17, 1945 – November 21, 2008) was an Argentine police chief and murderer. As a police officer during the last Argentine Dictatorship, he allegedly participated in the murder and forced disappearances of political dissidents during the Dirty War. In 1991, he murdered three men in the town of Laguna de Robles. He was convicted of murder in 1993 and discharged from the force. He committed suicide by gunshot in 2008 during an interview on live television while facing imminent arrest on human rights violations during the Dirty War.

== Early life ==
Mario Oscar Ferreyra was born on June 17, 1945, in Los Pereyra, Cruz Alta, a locality east of San Miguel de Tucumán. When he was 18 years old, he enlisted in the police. He had been deemed physically unfit because of his small stature and low weight, but managed to enter the force thanks to a relative. Ferreyra allegedly took part in the enforced disappearances, torture, and murder of dissidents in the 1970s. In 1973, he fought against 15 demonstrators of the Juventud Peronista during a brawl downtown, in which he was hit with a glass bottle, leaving him a scar that would last for the rest of his life. Two years after this, he killed Juan Carlos Alsogaray, a militant of Montoneros guerrilla faction, in a one-on-one confrontation. He shot him with a FN FAL rifle. During the Military Junta rule, he was suspended for two years and five months, after being accused by his superiors of the senseless use of lethal force. In 1986, after the return of democracy, he was prosecuted for the killing of the well known criminal Enrique "Prode" Correa, but justice acquitted him for lack of evidence. One year later, when he was the chief of Robos y Hurtos (Robbery Division of the Police), he was involved in a shooting in the northern approaches to the city of San Miguel de Tucumán, in which two members of a prominent crime family were killed. In 1988, he was accused of the killing of another member of that same crime family, Daniel Carrizo, who had also been tortured in a cell of the Robbery Division's headquarters before his death. He was again acquitted. In January 1990, he was named chief of the General Investigations Division, and two months later led a police strike against governor José Domato, which forced the Gendarmería Nacional Argentina to take the law enforcing duties in the province until the dispute was resolved in his favor. This earned him the respect and affection of his co-workers.

== Laguna de Robles triple murder ==
On October 10, 1991, in Laguna de Robles, a rural locality in the northern area of Tucumán, Ferreyra murdered three men named José "Coco" Menéndez, Hugo "Yegua Verde" Vera, and Ricardo "El Pelao" Andrada. Ferreyra claimed without evidence that the victims were criminals and had been killed in a shootout. In November of that same year, he accused other high-ranking officers of misappropriation of public funds. These same police officers would, the day after the accusations, discharge him from the force. A week later, police commissioner Alberto Ignacio Alcaraz accused Ferreyra of executing the three men, a claim that was supported by a former member of Ferreyra's inner circle. On December 9, he surrendered himself to the authorities. The trial started on November 26, 1993. He was found guilty on December 14, but escaped the courthouse by threatening to blow himself and the other people present in the room up with a grenade he had secretly brought in. 79 days later he was surrounded by federal forces in Zorro Muerto, in the neighboring province of Santiago del Estero and was injured in a shootout with the police. He was sent to Villa Urquiza prison, where he was supposed to spend 20 years. but was set free much sooner. The governor of Tucumán at the time, Antonio Domingo Bussi, was a former military officer who had taken part in the Process of National Reorganization and was fond of Malevo, so he reduced his sentence in 1996.

== Suicide ==
In 2008, during trials for crimes against humanity that took place during the Kirchnerist government, he was again charged for crimes he had allegedly committed during the Dirty War. On November 21, Gendarmería Nacional were sent to his house to arrest him. He climbed up a water tower and was followed by members of his family and a TV camera crew from national news broadcaster Crónica TV. Realizing he had been surrounded by about 20 policemen, and intent on avoiding imprisonment, he told his wife Maria that he would love her forever and then fatally shot himself in the head in front of his family and news reporters. He had stated earlier that day that he would take any measure in order not to go to jail again. During an interview shortly before his death, he hinted that he was going to commit suicide, saying that he would do "like Hannibal". TV cameras captured this moment from a very close distance, as he was being interviewed and took this decision unexpectedly. His death was broadcast to the entire nation of Argentina. He was survived by his wife and children.

== See also ==
- Christine Chubbuck
- R. Budd Dwyer
