= R.B. Swift =

American journalist

- Occupation: Journalist
- Notable credit: Times-Shamrock Communications

R.B. Swift is an American journalist, working as the Harrisburg, Pennsylvania bureau chief for the Times-Shamrock Communications newspapers.

The Pennsylvania Report named him to the 2009 "The Pennsylvania Report 100" list of influential figures in Pennsylvania politics, calling him a "pre-eminent Harrisburg political journalist." He is a frequent guest on Pennsylvania Cable Network's "Journalists Roundtable" television program.
