= R. Budd Dwyer =

American politician (1939–1987)

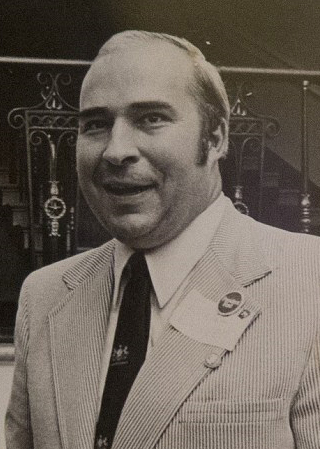
- Dwyer in 1977

70th Treasurer of Pennsylvania
- In office January 20, 1981 – January 22, 1987
- Governor: Dick Thornburgh; Bob Casey Sr.
- Deputy: Don Johnson
- Preceded by: Robert E. Casey
- Succeeded by: G. Davis Greene Jr.

Member of the Pennsylvania Senate from the 50th district
- In office January 5, 1971 – January 20, 1981
- Preceded by: James Willard
- Succeeded by: Roy Wilt

Member of the Pennsylvania House of Representatives
- In office January 7, 1969 – November 30, 1970
- Preceded by: District created
- Succeeded by: H. Harrison Haskell
- Constituency: 6th district
- In office January 5, 1965 – November 30, 1968
- Constituency: Crawford County district

Personal details
- Born: Robert Budd Dwyer; November 21, 1939 St. Charles, Missouri, U.S.
- Died: January 22, 1987 (aged 47) Harrisburg, Pennsylvania, U.S.
- Cause of death: Suicide by gunshot
- Party: Republican
- Spouse: Joanne Grappy (m. 1963)
- Children: 2
- Education: Allegheny College
- Profession: Politician, teacher
- Known for: Committing suicide during a filmed press conference after being convicted of accepting a bribe
- Criminal information
- Status: Deceased
- Convictions: Mail fraud (5 counts); Racketeering (4 counts); Perjury; Conspiracy to commit bribery
- Penalty: No penalty imposed, died before sentencing

Details
- Killed: 1 (himself)
- Date apprehended: October 22, 1984

Robert Budd Dwyer (November 21, 1939 – January 22, 1987) was an American politician who served as the 70th treasurer of Pennsylvania from 1981 until his suicide in 1987. A member of the Republican Party, he also served in the Pennsylvania House of Representatives and the Pennsylvania State Senate from 1971 to 1981, representing the state's 50th district.

While serving as state treasurer in 1984, Dwyer awarded a $4.6 million contract to data processing company Computer Technology Associates (CTA) to help compensate Pennsylvania employees who overpaid federal taxes because of errors in state withholding. An investigation determined Dwyer accepted a bribe to give CTA the contract over more experienced and less expensive competitors, which would have resulted in Pennsylvania losing $6 million if the scheme was successful. He was found guilty in December 1986 on 11 counts of conspiracy, mail fraud, perjury, and interstate transportation in aid of racketeering, which carried a maximum sentence of 55 years. The day before his sentencing, Dwyer arranged a press conference in his office and shot himself in the presence of reporters. His suicide was broadcast to many television viewers throughout Pennsylvania and the Delaware Valley.

Dwyer maintained his innocence until his death. His lawyers made posthumous appeals on his behalf, but all were denied and his convictions were sustained. Along with Barbara Hafer and Rob McCord, Dwyer is one of three Treasurers of Pennsylvania to be convicted of corruption since the 1980s, as well as the second in the 20th century, the first being William L. Mathues.

== Early life and education ==
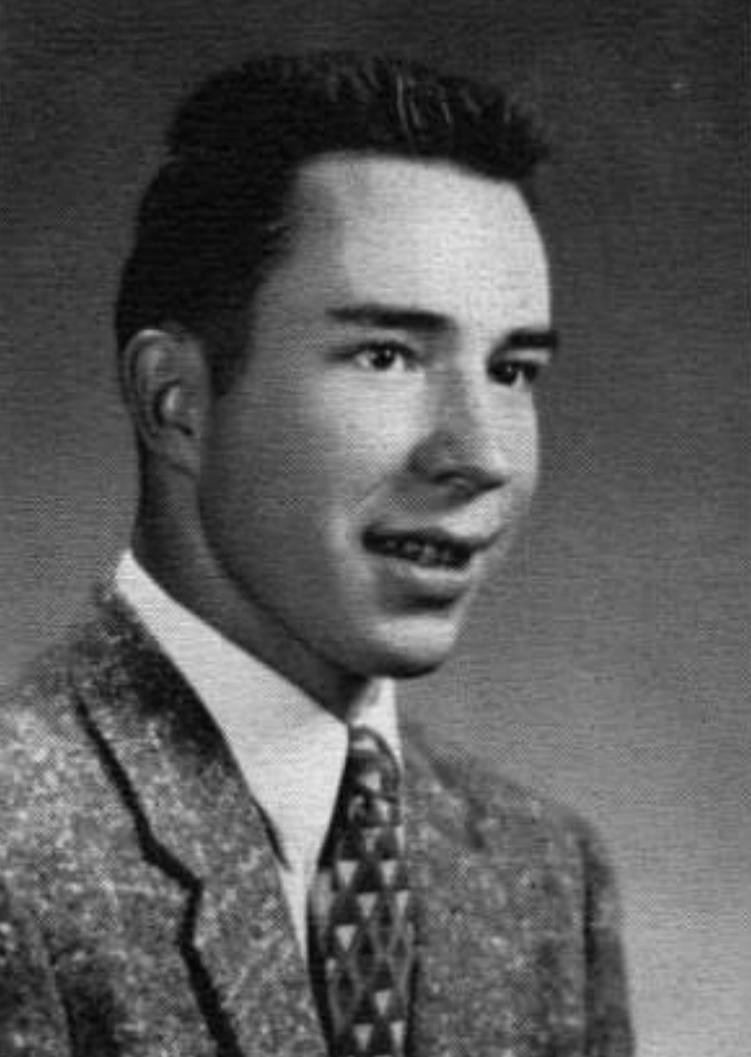
1957 high school portrait

Robert Budd Dwyer was born on November 21, 1939, in St. Charles, Missouri, to Robert Malcolm Dwyer (1899–1980) and Alice Budd Dwyer (1907–1972). He had one younger sister. He attended Townville High School, graduating in 1957.

Dwyer graduated in 1961 with an A.B. in Political Science and Accounting from Allegheny College in Meadville, Pennsylvania, where he was a member of the Beta Chi chapter of Theta Chi fraternity. After earning a master's degree in education in 1963, he taught social studies and coached football at Cambridge Springs High School.

== Career ==
=== Pennsylvania Assembly ===
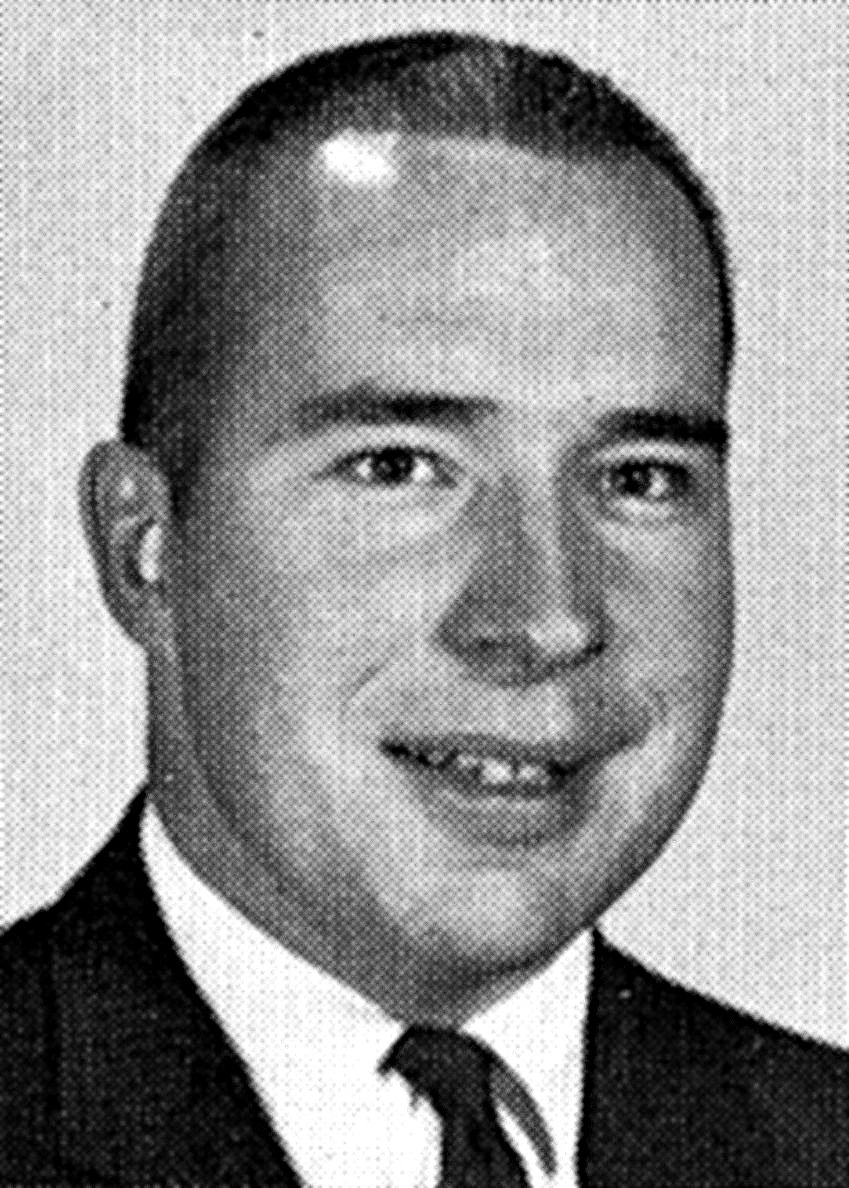
Official portrait, 1965

Dwyer became active in politics and was a member of the Republican Party. He was elected to the Pennsylvania House of Representatives from the 6th district (although seats were apportioned by county before 1969) in 1964 and was reelected in 1966 and 1968. In 1970, while still a State Representative, Dwyer campaigned to become a Pennsylvania State Senator for the Senate's 50th district, and won. Soon after his victory he resigned as Representative and was sworn in as Senator in January 1971. Dwyer also was a delegate to the 1976 Republican National Convention.

=== Pennsylvania Treasurer ===
After being elected to two additional terms in 1974 and 1978, Dwyer decided to try for a statewide office and in 1980 campaigned for and won the office of Pennsylvania Treasurer which had been held by Robert E. Casey (not to be confused with Governor of Pennsylvania Robert P. Casey) since 1976. He campaigned for a second and last term in 1984 and won re-election, defeating Democratic nominee and former auditor general Al Benedict. Dwyer stated that his Treasury administration "transformed the Department from a financial antique into one of the most modern in the nation, earning and saving hundreds of millions of dollars each year."

== CTA scandal ==
=== Background ===
From 1979 to 1981, before Dwyer was state treasurer, public employees of the Commonwealth of Pennsylvania overpaid millions of dollars in Federal Insurance Contributions Act (FICA) taxes. As a result, the state required an accounting company to determine refunds for its employees. Dwyer awarded the no-bid $4.6 million contract to Computer Technology Associates (CTA), a California-based data processing company, owned by John Torquato Jr., a native of Harrisburg, Pennsylvania, on May 10, 1984.

=== Investigation ===
During early 1984, Dennis Schatzman, deputy comptroller of Pittsburgh Public Schools, noticed financial discrepancies in the CTA contract, and wrote to Pittsburgh school officials regarding these. Schatzman later contacted officials of the accounting company Arthur Young and Associates, who confirmed that the no-bid CTA contract was overpriced by millions of dollars. In June 1984, the Office of the Pennsylvania Auditor General informed the Federal Bureau of Investigation (FBI) of the alleged bribery that occurred during the awarding of the contract.

During late July 1984, Janice R. Kincaid, a former CTA employee, released a sworn statement claiming that Dwyer awarded the contract to CTA because he was promised a $300,000 kickback by the company. Kincaid also indicated that Torquato directed female CTA employees to give sexual favors to potential clients. Torquato was also said to have targeted multiple other state and local officials in Pennsylvania for bribes, including Pennsylvania Attorney General LeRoy Zimmerman.

Dwyer's awarding of the CTA contract was investigated by federal prosecutors. Upon learning of this investigation, Dwyer rescinded the contract with CTA on July 11, 1984. Subsequently, Dwyer repeatedly attempted to stop, divert and forestall the investigation, stating that the U.S. attorney had neither the authority nor evidence to pursue prosecution. Dwyer later admitted to telling his staff to withhold request for proposal (RFP) information from the U.S. attorney and the FBI during the investigation. After being indicted by a federal grand jury, Dwyer was finally charged with agreeing to receive a kickback of $300,000 in return for awarding CTA the contract.

Dwyer stated that he offered to take a polygraph test on the condition that if he passed it, he would not be indicted. The state rejected Dwyer's offer. Prior to Dwyer's indictment, on October 22, 1984, a grand jury indicted Torquato, Torquato's attorney William T. Smith, Judy Smith, Alan R. Stoneman, and David Herbert. At his 1985 trial, Smith, who was a friend of Dwyer's, testified that he did not bribe Dwyer, and instead that Torquato offered Dwyer a campaign contribution in return for the CTA contract, yet Dwyer rejected Torquato's offer. In contrast, Torquato testified that Smith offered Dwyer a $300,000 bribe in return for the CTA contract. Dwyer, acting as a defense witness at Smith's trial, denied that he was offered a contribution. In August 1984, Smith failed a polygraph test when he stated that he did not bribe Dwyer or any state official. However, prior to his trial on October 27, 1984 (four days after his indictment), Smith confessed to offering Dwyer a bribe, and stated that Dwyer accepted this offer.

I met with Dwyer in his office and at the insistence of Torquato offered to give him $300,000 if he signed a contract with CTA LTD. Dwyer talked about $100,000 to him personally—$100,000 to his campaign committee—$100,000 to Republican State Committee. [Dwyer] was going to see Robert Asher in Montgomery County that weekend to talk to him about how this should be done.

Robert B. Asher, the then Pennsylvania Republican Party Chairman, objected to this, and requested that the $300,000 be directed entirely to the Republican State Committee, since Asher "did not want Dwyer to go to jail".

Asher indicated that he had had a conversation with Mr. Dwyer, and he knew that I had made an offer to him of a $300,000 contribution, and then he was very angry when he began to talk about that, angry with me. Said he thought I knew better than to offer a contribution to Mr. Dwyer, and he said if there was going to be a contribution, it was going to go to Republican State Committee.

=== Indictment ===
Dwyer's indictment

Dwyer, along with Asher, was indicted by a federal grand jury on May 13, 1986. In the hopes of reducing his twelve-year sentence resulting from his 1985 conviction, Smith testified on behalf of the federal government against Dwyer and Asher at their 1986 trial. Ultimately, Smith did not receive any reduction of his sentence for testifying against Dwyer (although his wife, Judy Smith, was granted immunity from prosecution). Before testifying against Dwyer, Smith passed a polygraph test.

It was revealed at Dwyer's trial that he sought and won approval for special legislation—Act 38 of 1984 (House Bill 1397)—that authorized him to recover the FICA overpayments, and that coded computer tape seized from CTA's office on July 6, 1984, showed that Dwyer was to receive a $300,000 pay-off for awarding CTA the contract. Moreover, Smith and Torquato's claims about Dwyer being bribed were corroborated by four independent and impartial witnesses, and Smith's testimony against Dwyer was virtually identical to written statements Smith made long before entering into a plea agreement. Additionally, FBI agents testified that Dwyer attempted to conceal his involvement with the scheme when, after learning of the FBI investigation, he erased the entry in his appointment book of the March 2, 1984, meeting with Torquato and Smith in which he was first offered a bribe.

Dwyer maintained that he awarded CTA the contract on the basis of his treasury task force recommendation; this conflicted with the fact that Dwyer personally managed all matters relating to the contract six days prior to awarding it to CTA. Furthermore, his task force's contribution merely consisted in the making of a single telephone call to David I. Herbert (the former State Director for Social Security, who controlled FICA recovery for Pennsylvania's public employees, and who was convicted subsequently for conspiring with CTA). Dwyer awarded the contract to CTA—an obscure California-based company with three employees, little equipment, and little experience—despite being informed in April 1984 by the major Pennsylvania-based accounting company Arthur Young and Associates, which had 250 employees and submitted a proposal on April 13, 1984, at least 14 days prior to CTA's proposal, that they could perform the FICA recovery as fast as CTA for half the cost.

=== Trial and conviction ===
Charles Collins, Arthur Young's former management consulting director in Pittsburgh, testified at Dwyer's trial that Arthur Young and Associates, who, unlike CTA, had experience in identical tax recovery work, was prepared to negotiate the FICA recovery contract (that was half the cost of the CTA contract) and that Dwyer was clearly aware of Arthur Young's offer before committing the contract to CTA. Additionally, 16 other competitors were willing to be considered for the FICA recovery contract and many had communicated with Treasurer Dwyer's office to request an opportunity to bid on the contract, yet Dwyer did not respond. Dwyer repeatedly stated that he awarded the contract to CTA as a result of his task force's recommendation on the basis of CTA's providing "immediate credit", yet the contract between CTA and Dwyer contained no information regarding CTA's ability to provide such credit. Moreover, Dwyer admitted that he did not mention the concept of "immediate credit" to Arthur Young and Associates when officials from the company asked why CTA was chosen instead of them. In contradiction to Dwyer's statements about awarding CTA the contract on the basis of their providing "immediate credit", Arthur Young and Associates were told that CTA got the contract since they first recognized that the overpayments could be recovered, and that they endorsed legislation that gave Dwyer the sole power to award said contract.

Dwyer denied any wrongdoing, stating that after the CTA contract was signed, Smith merely made a "generic" offer to assist his campaign. Dwyer's lawyer spoke to the prosecutor, acting U.S. Attorney James West, asking him if he would dismiss all charges against Dwyer if Dwyer resigned as state treasurer. West refused the offer but offered to let Dwyer plead guilty to a single charge of bribe receiving, which would have meant a maximum of five years' imprisonment, as long as he resigned from his office as Treasurer of Pennsylvania and cooperated completely with the government's investigation, but Dwyer refused and went to trial. At his trial, Dwyer did not testify, and his lawyer, Paul Killion, presented no defense witnesses, since he thought that the government did not sufficiently prove its case. It is possible that Dwyer did not testify in his own defense since he did not want to be questioned regarding his involvement in a 1980 conspiracy involving his wife's business "Poli-Ed," and two Pennsylvania State Education Association (PSEA) employees. One of these employees was Dwyer's close friend and campaign manager Fred Mckillop, who was subsequently dismissed by the PSEA for his involvement with the scheme, and who later featured in a 2010 documentary about Dwyer. In this conspiracy, which was investigated by the office of the Pennsylvania Attorney General, Dwyer allegedly siphoned money from his campaign into his personal funds.

On December 18, 1986, Dwyer was found guilty on 11 counts of conspiracy, mail fraud, perjury and interstate transportation in aid of racketeering, and was consequently liable to a sentence of as much as 55 years imprisonment and a $300,000 fine. His sentencing was scheduled for January 23, 1987, to be performed by U.S. District Court Judge Malcolm Muir. One mail-fraud charge against Dwyer was dismissed by Judge Muir. One juror, Carolyn Edwards of Williamsport, found it emotionally difficult to convict Dwyer (and Asher) since they were men of "very high integrity ... they just made a mistake", while Dwyer made a statement after the verdict saying "This is a sad and shocking day for me, totally unbelievable, I'm totally innocent of all of these charges and I don't know how this could have happened". Robert B. Asher, Dwyer's co-defendant, was sentenced to one year in jail.

Accounting company Levin-Horwath ultimately fulfilled the contract for $1.3 million with slightly more than a third of the fee possibly being subject to rebate. Had CTA performed the recovery work, Pennsylvania would have lost $6 million. Pennsylvania law stated that Dwyer could not officially be dismissed from office until his sentencing in January. Given this, Dwyer stated that until his legal appeal was resolved, he would continue as treasurer with a leave of absence without pay and would not resign before having the opportunity to appeal his conviction. In the interim, the treasury department would be managed by Deputy Treasurer Donald L. Johnson. Dwyer continued to profess his innocence after being convicted, and on December 23 wrote a letter to President Ronald Reagan seeking a presidential pardon, and to Senator Arlen Specter seeking assistance with this effort. The week of Dwyer's sentencing, Pennsylvania State Attorney General LeRoy Zimmerman and state prosecutors were investigating a provision of the Pennsylvania state constitution such that dismissal of a civil worker from office who has been convicted of a crime is "self-executing", thus, automatic upon that person's sentencing. A decision confirming this constitutional provision was expected on January 22, the day before Dwyer's sentencing hearing.

== Final press conference and suicide ==
In a meeting in his home on January 15, 1987, Dwyer discussed the idea of a press conference with his press secretary, James "Duke" Horshock, and Deputy Treasurer, Don Johnson. At the meeting, both Horshock and Johnson cautioned Dwyer not to use the conference to attack the governor, or other individuals involved with his criminal conviction, and both suggested to Dwyer that he should have the conference at a location other than his office. Dwyer angrily rejected their suggestion, but nevertheless assured both men that he would not attack anybody involved with his conviction. He said that he would not announce his resignation at the conference, but rather thank his staff and friends. Both men left assuming Dwyer would ultimately resign at the conference, although Horshock had fears that Dwyer would break his promise.

On January 21, Dwyer asked his press secretary Horshock and deputy press secretary Gregory Penny to schedule a news conference for the next day without telling them what he was to discuss. Horshock arranged the press conference for 10:30 a.m. EST the next day, January 22. The press secretary summoned dozens of reporters asking them to attend, and told them he did not know its subject.

The night before the press conference, Dwyer wrote the following note: "I enjoy being with Jo so much, the next 20 years or so would have been wonderful. Tomorrow is going to be so difficult and I hope I can go through with it."

=== Press statement ===
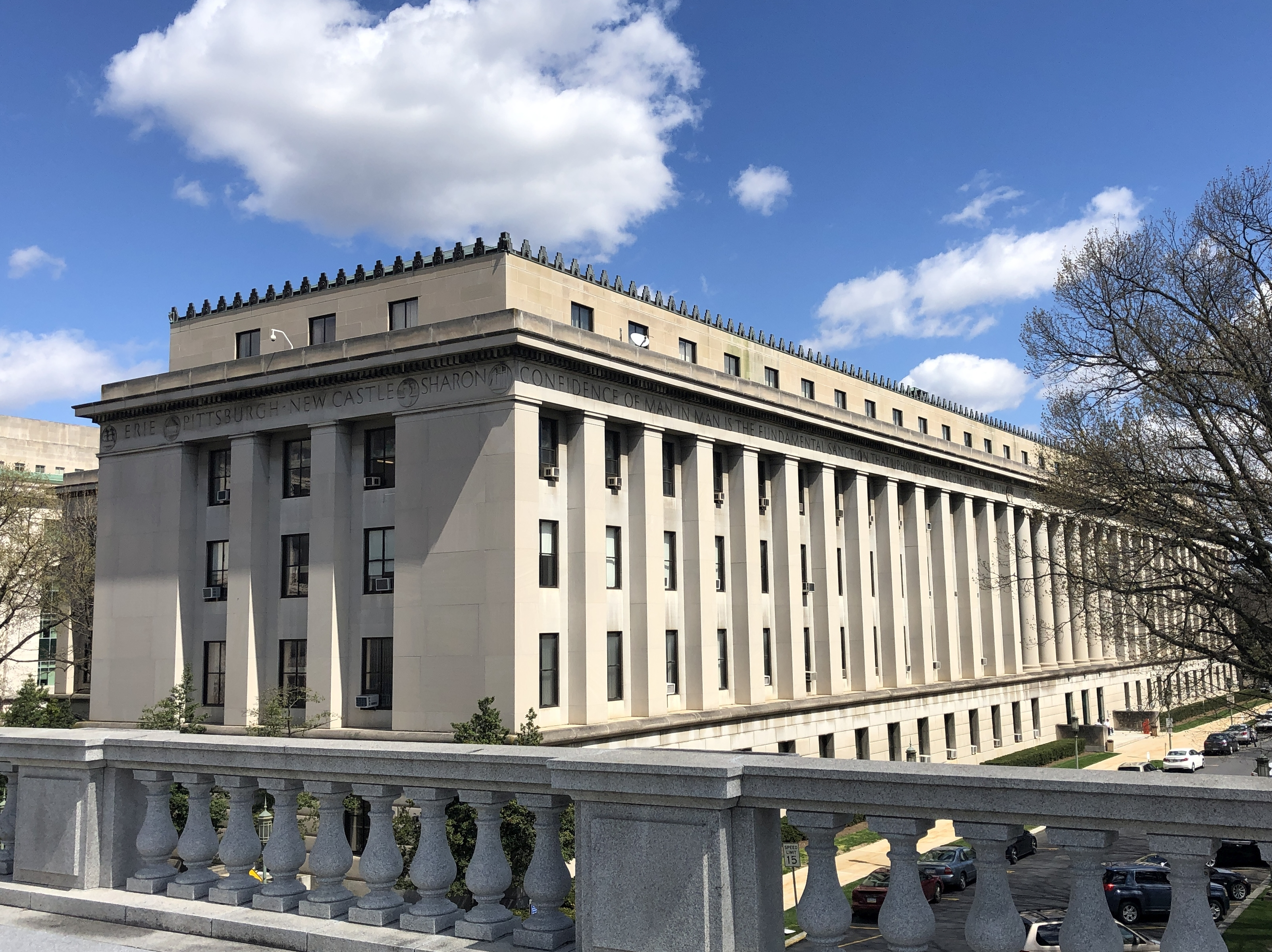
The Pennsylvania Finance Building, where Dwyer held his press conference

The next morning, Dwyer went to his press conference as planned. Standing behind a large wood table that separated him from nine television cameras, four wire service photographers and approximately twenty television, radio and newspaper reporters, he began reading from a 21-page prepared text, while aides handed a 20-page version to the media. The final page was expected to be his announcement that he would resign from office. Appearing agitated, Dwyer again professed his innocence and accused acting U.S. Attorney James West, FBI agents, U.S. District Court Judge Malcolm Muir, the media and others for abusing the justice system and ruining him. Dwyer alleged that his legal woes were political persecution due to his refusal to grant a travel voucher for Governor Dick Thornburgh's wife for her trip to Europe, alleging that Thornburgh had said that he would "get Dwyer" and that Thornburgh had referred to him as "the fat fuck". Dwyer stated that Attorney West purposely held his trial not in Harrisburg but in Williamsport, due to it being located in Lycoming County, one of the most uneducated counties in Pennsylvania. Dwyer spoke out against the death penalty and expressed regret for voting in favor of it while he was in the Pennsylvania assembly. This speech lasted nearly 30 minutes, and approximately halfway through it, some of the gathered press began to pack and leave. Dwyer spotted this and interrupted himself to say, "Those of you who are putting your cameras away, I think you ought to stay because we're not, we're not finished yet."

After deciding to break from his speech, Dwyer called to three of his staffers, giving each a sealed envelope with the insignia of the treasury department. The first envelope, given to Bob Holste, contained a letter addressed to then-Pennsylvania Governor Bob Casey, who had assumed office just two days earlier. The second, given to deputy press secretary Gregory Penny, contained an organ donor card and other related materials. The last, given to Deputy Treasurer Don Johnson, contained materials intended for Dwyer's family, including three letters: one for his wife Joanne, and one for each of his children, Rob and DeeDee (Dyan), and suggested funeral arrangements. Freelance photographer Gary Dwight Miller, one of the reporters in attendance, described the scene at this time, stating: "It was just kind of a long-winded, sad event."

=== Suicide ===
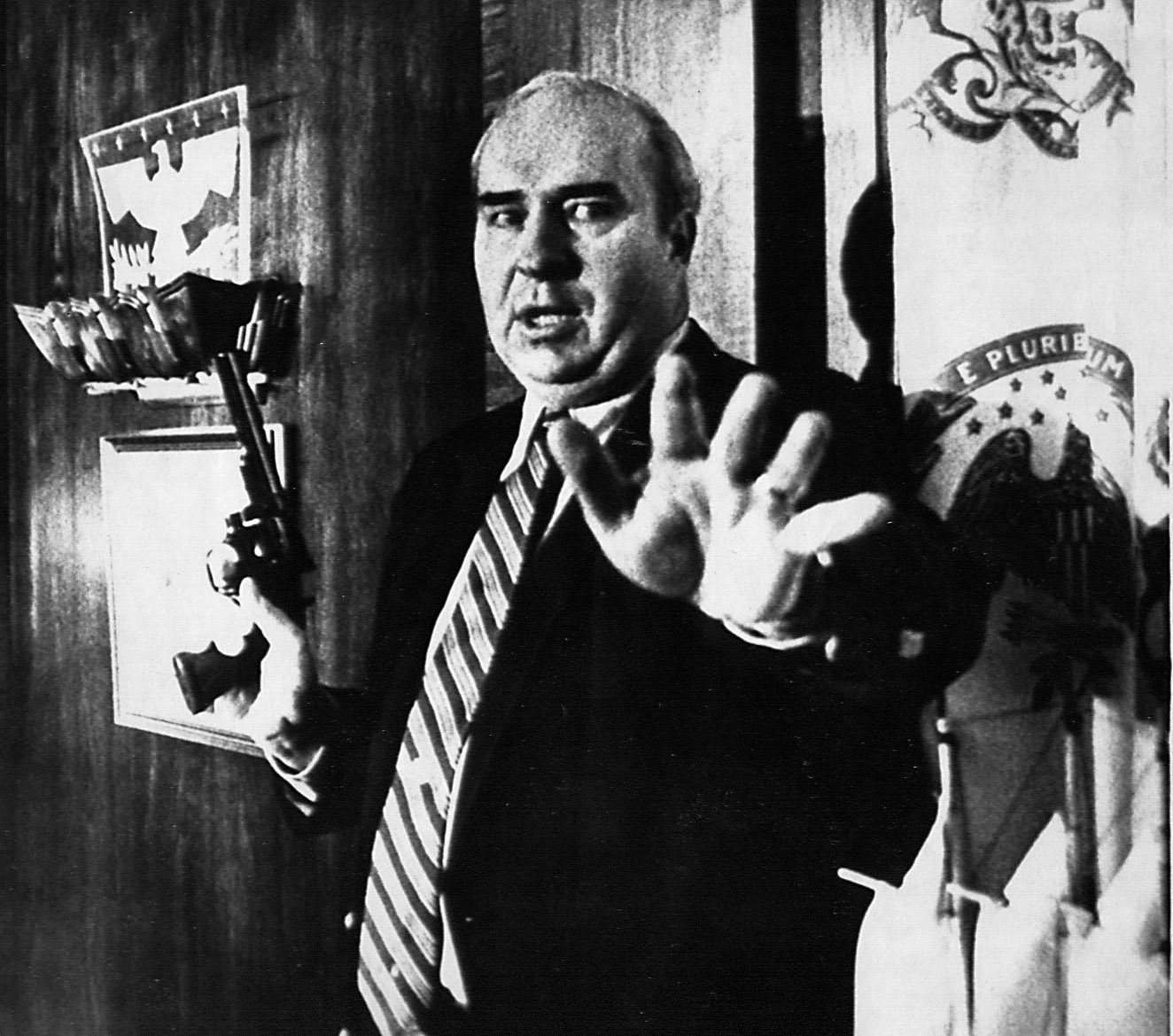
Dwyer holding a .357 Magnum Smith & Wesson Model 19 revolver seconds before he fired a single shot through the roof of his mouth, killing himself instantly.

After he had finished speaking and handing out the notes to his staffers, Dwyer grabbed a manila envelope and drew a Model 19 .357 Magnum revolver from it, causing others to panic. Kenn Marshall, a reporter with The Patriot-News, later stated in an interview that he feared Dwyer would turn the gun on the reporters in attendance. Dwyer backed up against the wall, holding the weapon close to his body, and said, "Please, please leave the room if this will — if this will affect you." Reporters David Morris of the Associated Press, Thom Cole of UPI and Gary Warner of afternoon newspaper The Pittsburgh Press were at the rear of the room, waiting for Dwyer to say he had resigned so they could run down the hall to telephones to tell their editors they could publish pre-written stories and add Dwyer's direct quote. When Dwyer produced the revolver, the three ran into the hallway and shouted to a state police kiosk in the center of the long hallway that the treasurer had a gun.

Several people in the room pleaded with Dwyer to surrender the gun or tried to approach him and seize the weapon. Dwyer warned against either action, saying as his last words: "No. This will hurt someone." Dwyer then killed himself with a single shot through the roof of the mouth. His death was recorded by at least five running news cameras. Dwyer was pronounced dead at 11:31 a.m. He was interred at Blooming Valley Cemetery in Saegertown on January 26. Per his status as an organ donor, Dwyer's corneas and ear cartilage were made available for transplant. Dwyer's body was left in the room for several hours as law enforcement conducted an investigation into whether or not any of Dwyer's aides had assisted him in his suicide, ultimately concluding they had not. By the time his body was recovered, it had been too long since his death for any other organs to be usable.

=== Aftermath ===
Many television stations throughout Pennsylvania broadcast taped footage of Dwyer's suicide to a midday audience. Philadelphia station WPVI-TV showed Dwyer pulling the trigger and falling backwards, but did not show the bullet path. It chose not to show the gunshot a second time. During the next several hours, news editors had to decide how much of the explicit footage they wanted to broadcast. Many chose not to broadcast the final moments of the suicide.

Many stations, including KYW-TV and WCAU-TV in Philadelphia and KDKA-TV in Pittsburgh, stopped the action just before the gunshot. However, the last two allowed the audio of the shooting to continue with the stopped image. Westinghouse Broadcasting (then-parent of KYW-TV and KDKA-TV) news cameraman William L. Martin and reporter David Sollenberger had a camera set up at the conference; they chose to broadcast the audio with a freeze-frame of the gun in Dwyer's mouth. Only a handful broadcast the unedited press conference. WPVI-TV rebroadcast the suicide footage in full on their 5:00 p.m. and 6:00 p.m. Action News broadcast without warning the viewers. That station's broadcast is a source for copies available on the Internet. WPXI in Pittsburgh is reported by the Associated Press to have broadcast the footage uncensored on an early newscast. In explaining the decision to broadcast, WPXI operations manager By Williams said, "It's an important event [about] an important man." Williams avoided broadcasting the footage in the evening newscasts, explaining, "Everyone knows by then that [Dwyer] did it. There are children out of school." However, in central Pennsylvania, many children were home from school during the day of Dwyer's suicide due to a snowstorm. Some central Pennsylvania channels exposed children to Dwyer's traumatizing entire suicide without edit. The moment of Dwyer's suicide did not appear on any national newscast. NBC Nightly News and CNN's coverage only showed Dwyer holding the gun and stopped before he placed it in his mouth, and CBS Evening News and ABC World News Tonight did not include any footage from the press conference in their reports.

The letter Dwyer sent Casey stated, "By the time you receive this letter ... the office of State Treasurer of Pennsylvania will be vacant. I stress to you that I did not resign but was State Treasurer of Pennsylvania to the end." It also stated that Casey "will be the great Governor that Pennsylvania needs at this time in our history." He suggested his wife Joanne as his successor, describing her as "very talented, personable, organized and hard-working." Governor Casey did not accept Dwyer's suggestion. Regardless of the events of January 22, the governor and legislature of Pennsylvania already expected Dwyer to either resign or be dismissed from office. As such, a deal had already been brokered wherein the next treasurer, a Democrat, would serve the remnant of Dwyer's term and resign at its end. This was G. Davis Greene Jr., who was appointed as the 71st Treasurer of Pennsylvania on January 23, 1987, the day after Dwyer's suicide.

== Posthumous appeals ==
On January 27, 1987, Dwyer's lawyers filed an appeal in the U.S. District Court for the Middle District of Pennsylvania seeking the dismissal of all post-trial motions that were then pending against Dwyer, abatement of Dwyer's conviction and the dismissal of his May 13, 1986 indictment. On March 5, 1987, the district court denied all motions, stating that "there were no grounds whatsoever upon which Mr. Dwyer could hope to succeed upon appeal" and ordered to "close this file as to R. Budd Dwyer". Dwyer's lawyers appealed this decision, and the U.S. Court of Appeals for the Third Circuit subsequently vacated the judgment. On remand, the district court was instructed to dismiss Dwyer's motions (since the Court lacked subject matter jurisdiction), and Dwyer's convictions for mail fraud and conspiracy were sustained. Six years after Dwyer's death, efforts were made to exonerate Dwyer when a retrial request was filed in U.S. District Court in July 1993. This request was denied in October of the same year.

== Electoral history ==
1980 Pennsylvania State Treasurer election
Party	Candidate	Votes	%
Republican	R. Budd Dwyer	2,055,199	49.43%
Democratic	Robert E. Casey	2,003,126	48.18%
Consumer	Thelma R. Hambright	43,801	1.05%
Libertarian	Frank W. Bubb III	31,573	0.76%
Socialist Workers	Tory A. Dunn	23,879	0.57%
Total votes		4,157,578	100.00%
Republican gain from Democratic			

1984 Pennsylvania State Treasurer Republican primary election
Party	Candidate	Votes	%
Republican	R. Budd Dwyer (incumbent)	578,063	100.00%
Total votes		578,063	100.00%

1984 Pennsylvania State Treasurer election
Party	Candidate	Votes	%
Republican	R. Budd Dwyer	2,348,977	51.78%
Democratic	Al Benedict	2,040,693	44.99%
Consumer	Priscilla L. Thomas	115,905	2.56%
Libertarian	Ralph Mullinger	30,496	0.67%
Total votes		4,536,071	100.00%
Republican hold			

== See also ==
Related to the article:

- John Torquato Jr.
- Robert B. Asher
- William Trickett Smith

For similar cases:

- Christine Chubbuck
- Malevo Ferreyra

Party political offices
Preceded by Patricia Crawford	Republican nominee for Treasurer of Pennsylvania; 1980, 1984	Succeeded by Phil English
Political offices
Preceded by Robert E. Casey	Treasurer of Pennsylvania; 1981–1987	Succeeded by G. Davis Greene Jr.
