= Al Benedict =

American politician (1929–2003)

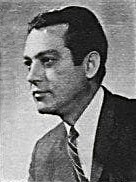
- Benedict, c. 1960s

44th Auditor General of Pennsylvania
- In office 1977–1985
- Preceded by: Bob Casey Sr.
- Succeeded by: Donald A. Bailey

Personal details
- Born: March 5, 1929 McKeesport, Pennsylvania, U.S.
- Died: August 31, 2003 (aged 74) Plant City, Florida, U.S.
- Party: Democratic
- Occupation: Politician

Al Benedict (March 5, 1929 – August 31, 2003) was an American politician who served as Pennsylvania Auditor General from 1977 to 1985. He was convicted on federal racketeering and tax fraud charges in 1988. He was sentenced to six years in prison and released after two.

== Life and career ==
Benedict was born on March 5, 1929, in McKeesport, Pennsylvania. A Democrat and former WSEE-TV anchor and Erie controller, Benedict was considered a top candidate for governor before his chief aide, John Kerr, pleaded guilty to federal corruption charges related to job-selling in 1984.

Limited to two terms as auditor general, Benedict won the Democratic nomination for Pennsylvania Treasurer in 1984, defeating Lieutenant Governor Catherine Baker Knoll. Benedict went on to lose the general election to Republican nominee R. Budd Dwyer, who was convicted on federal bribery charges two years later and committed suicide during a press conference.

In 1988, Benedict pleaded guilty to federal racketeering and tax fraud charges and was sentenced to six years in prison by Williamsport District Judge Malcolm Muir, serving two years. After his release, he worked as a salesman and apartment manager and moved to Florida in 1994.

Party political offices
Preceded by Bob Casey Sr.	Democratic nominee for Pennsylvania Auditor General; 1976, 1980	Succeeded by Donald A. Bailey
Preceded by Robert E. Casey	Democratic nominee for Treasurer of Pennsylvania; 1984	Succeeded by Catherine Baker Knoll
Political offices
Preceded by Bob Casey Sr.	Pennsylvania Auditor General; 1977–1985	Succeeded by Donald A. Bailey
