= G. Davis Greene Jr. =

American politician

71st Treasurer of Pennsylvania
- In office January 23, 1987 (Note: Acting: January 23 – February 11, 1987) – January 17, 1989
- Governor: Bob Casey Sr.
- Preceded by: R. Budd Dwyer
- Succeeded by: Catherine Baker Knoll

Personal details
- Born: March 22, 1931 Philadelphia, Pennsylvania, U.S.
- Died: September 2, 2012 (aged 81) Wyndmoor, Pennsylvania, U.S.
- Party: Democratic
- Spouse: Ann Norcott Greene
- Education: University of Pennsylvania

G. Davis Greene Jr. (March 22, 1931 – September 2, 2012) was an American politician and member of the Democratic Party who served as the 71st Treasurer of Pennsylvania from January 1987 to January 1989.

== Biography ==
Greene served in the United States Navy. He graduated from University of Pennsylvania and was a financial adviser.

Greene was appointed to the office by Pennsylvania Governor Bob Casey on January 23, 1987, the day after the suicide of his predecessor, R. Budd Dwyer. He was sworn into office on February 11, 1987, after a unanimous vote by the Pennsylvania Senate.

Greene's appointment and confirmation to treasurer was done on the understanding that he would not seek a full four-year term in 1988. As agreed upon, he stepped down after the completion of Dwyer's term, and was succeeded by Catherine Baker Knoll.

== Notes ==
Political offices
| Preceded by R. Budd Dwyer | Treasurer of Pennsylvania; 1987–1989 | Succeeded by Catherine Baker Knoll |
