= Honest Man: The Life of R. Budd Dwyer =

- Film poster
- Directed by: James Dirschberger
- Written by: Adam Wroblewski; James Dirschberger
- Produced by: Matt Levie; James Dirschberger
- Starring: R. Budd Dwyer
- Edited by: Matt Levie
- Music by: Chris Woodhouse
- Distributed by: Eighty Four Films, LLC
- Release dates: October 9, 2010 (Carmel Art & Film Festival)
- Running time: 76 minutes
- Country: United States
- Language: English

Honest Man: The Life of R. Budd Dwyer is a 2010 American documentary film by James Dirschberger that chronicles the Computer Technology Associates (CTA) scandal which led to the public suicide of R. Budd Dwyer, the Treasurer of the Commonwealth of Pennsylvania, in 1987.

The documentary features new interviews with Dwyer's family, friends, and colleagues. These interviews include Dwyer's widow Joanne (her last before her death in 2009) and William Trickett Smith.

The film premiered on October 9, 2010 at the Carmel Art & Film Festival in Carmel, California, where it received positive reviews. In November 2010, the film premiered in Harrisburg, Pennsylvania, the location of Dwyer's death, where it ran for one week at the Midtown Cinema. The director and the Dwyer family attended the screening and participated in a Q&A with the audience. In addition to further screenings around the country, the film was released on DVD on December 7, 2010. That same month it was broadcast on the Pennsylvania Cable Network. The film premiered on Amazon Video in December 2017.

== Cast ==
- Dyan Dwyer
- Joanne Dwyer
- R. Budd Dwyer
- Robert Dwyer
- Vince Yakowicz
- Fred McKillop
- Bill Keisling
