= Patricia Crawford =

American politician

Member of the Pennsylvania House of Representatives from the 156th district
- In office January 7, 1969 – November 30, 1976
- Preceded by: District Created
- Succeeded by: Elinor Z. Taylor

Personal details
- Born: September 6, 1928 Middletown, Pennsylvania, U.S.
- Died: February 11, 2008 (aged 79) Leesburg, New Jersey, U.S.
- Party: Republican

Patricia Ann Crawford (September 6, 1928 – February 11, 2008) was a government official of the Commonwealth of Pennsylvania and a Republican member of the Pennsylvania House of Representatives.

She ran for Pennsylvania Treasurer in 1976 but lost to Democratic nominee Robert E. Casey.

== Formative years ==
Born in Middletown, Pennsylvania, on September 6, 1928, Crawford graduated from Murphy High School in Alabama, and then pursued higher education studies at the Keystone Business School and West Chester State College (now West Chester University).

== Career ==
A legal secretary who was employed by Blue Cross, she was elected as a Republican to the Pennsylvania House of Representatives for the 1969 term. She subsequently served three consecutive terms, and chose not to run for reelection for the 1977 term.

After an unsuccessful campaign for the position of Pennsylvania State Treasurer in 1976), she was appointed to the Governor's Commission on Women (1976–1977), and then was appointed as deputy secretary of the Commonwealth (1978–1986).

A member of the Republican State Committee (1979–1980), she was then appointed by the governor to the Pennsylvania Crime Victim's Compensation Board and the Pennsylvania Municipal Retirement Board (1981–1982).

== Death and interment ==
Crawford died on February 11, 2008, in Leesburg, New Jersey, and was interred at the Saint Luke Evangelical Lutheran Church Memorial Garden in Devon, Pennsylvania.

Pennsylvania House of Representatives
Preceded by District Created	Member of the Pennsylvania House of Representatives for the 156th District; 1969–1976	Succeeded by Elinor Z. Taylor
Party political offices
Preceded by Glenn Williams	Republican nominee for Treasurer of Pennsylvania; 1976	Succeeded by R. Budd Dwyer
