= John Torquato Jr. =

American businessman and fraudster (born 1941–1942)

- Born: 1941 or 1942 (age 83–84)
- Employer: Computer Technology Associates Inc. (owner)
- Known for: Ringleader of the CTA scandal
- Status: Released
- Motive: To rig a government contract in his favor
- Conviction: Pled guilty to 1 count of conspiracy
- Penalty: 4 years in federal prison

John R. Torquato Jr. (born 1941–1942) is an American businessman, convicted fraudster, and former book salesman who was the ringleader of the CTA scandal, a scheme to have a $4.8 million Pennsylvania state contract to recover around $40 million in overpayments by state workers to the Social Security Administration awarded to his data processing company, Computer Technology Associates Inc.

== Conspiracy trial ==
As the head of Computer Technology Associates, Torquato provided gifts to several state and local officials and attempted to bribe the state director of Social Security for state employees, David Herbert, Pittsburgh City Council President Robert Rade Stone, Pennsylvania Attorney General LeRoy Zimmerman, and Treasurer of Pennsylvania R. Budd Dwyer, with money offers ranging from $6,375 to $300,000, in order to secure a government contract for CTA to handle the recovery of overpayments of FICA taxes by Pennsylvania state employees. Had the scheme been successful, the state government of Pennsylvania would have lost $6,000,000.

CTA employee Janice Kincaid also alleged that Torquato ordered female CTA employees to provide sexual favors for clients of the company, stating that he told her to do anything that she needed to do to "make any of our customers happy". Torquato was also alleged to have controlled a Swiss bank account which held over $400,000 in assets.

=== Conviction ===
Torquato pled guilty to one count of conspiracy and was sentenced by Williamsport District Judge Malcolm Muir to four years in federal prison in 1984.

== Bibliography ==
- Torquato, John Jr. (1983). Why Winners Win!: Techniques of Advocate Selling. AMACOM. ISBN 978-0-8144-5770-2.

== See also ==
- Robert B. Asher
- William Trickett Smith
- R. Budd Dwyer
