= William Trickett Smith =

American lawyer and criminal (1937–2021)

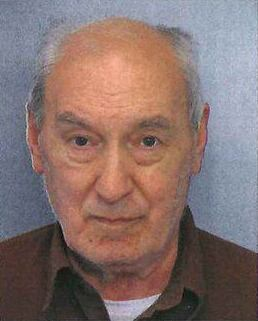
- 2013 mug shot of Smith
- Born: August 16, 1937; Harrisburg, Pennsylvania, U.S.
- Died: March 20, 2021 (aged 83); Camp Hill, Pennsylvania, U.S.
- Occupations: Lawyer, Republican committeeman
- Political party: Republican
- Children: William Trickett Smith II (c. 1981)
- Convictions: Bid rigging (1985); Theft by unlawful taking and deception (2010); Arson and insurance fraud (2012); Assisting in the attempted escape of a person in custody and making false statements (2014)

William Trickett Smith Sr. (August 16, 1937 – March 20, 2021) was an American Republican committeeman, lawyer, and convicted felon. He was the former chairman of the Dauphin County Republican Committee. He was convicted of several crimes from 1985 to 2014, ranging from bid rigging in the CTA scandal that led to the suicide of Pennsylvania State Treasurer R. Budd Dwyer, to plotting a prison break for his son, William Trickett Smith II, who, in 2011, was convicted of the 2007 murder of his wife, Jana Claudia Gómez Menéndez.

== Crimes ==
In 1985, he was disbarred and imprisoned for bid rigging in the CTA scandal, the scandal that led to the suicide of Pennsylvania State Treasurer R. Budd Dwyer. Smith was one of the main prosecution witnesses in Dwyer's trial. Smith later admitted in an interview shown in Honest Man: The Life of R. Budd Dwyer that he had lied under oath in his own 1985 trial when he denied offering Dwyer a bribe. In the documentary, he maintained that his testimony at Dwyer's 1986 trial that he offered Dwyer a bribe and that Dwyer accepted this offer was truthful.

In 2007, Smith was caught forging the signature of an NAACP official in an attempt to help his son get a lighter sentence. When this was discovered, Smith voluntarily gave up his law license. In 2010, Smith was convicted of theft by unlawful taking and deception for stealing over $73,000 from three clients at his law firm, including a woman with dementia who gave him the proceeds from the sale of her house. Smith was later convicted of arson and insurance fraud in 2012 for burning down a guest house in 2007 in order to destroy records ordered to be turned over in relation to his theft case. Smith was also known to fake heart attacks on numerous occasions, including when he was summoned before a grand jury in the arson case.

In 2014, he was again sentenced for conspiring to help his son escape by filing a false criminal complaint to have him temporarily extradited from Peru back to Pennsylvania.

Smith died March 20, 2021, in Camp Hill, Pennsylvania.

== See also ==
- John Torquato Jr.
- Robert B. Asher
