= Robert B. Asher =

American politician (born 1937)

Member of the Republican National Committee from Pennsylvania
- In office November 18, 1998 – July 10, 2020 Serving with Christine Jack Toretti
- Preceded by: Tim Lambert
- Succeeded by: Andy Reilly

Chairman of the Pennsylvania Republican Party
- In office June 18, 1983 – February 8, 1986
- Preceded by: Martha Bell Schoeninger
- Succeeded by: Earl M. Baker

Personal details
- Born: September 7, 1937 (age 88)
- Party: Republican
- Education: University of Pennsylvania
- Occupation: Businessman; politician

Robert B. Asher (born September 7, 1937) is an American politician and businessman from Montgomery County, Pennsylvania. He is the co-chairman of the board of directors of Asher's Chocolates in Pennsylvania and also served as Pennsylvania's committeeman on the Republican National Committee by appointment in 1998 by Governor Tom Ridge. He was a member of the 2016 Electoral College.

== Education ==
Asher attended Germantown Academy from kindergarten through 12th grade; he played on the football team. Asher went on to graduate from the Wharton School of Business at the University of Pennsylvania in 1960. He was the co-chairman of the Board of Directors of Asher's Chocolate Co., which his family has owned for four generations.

== Career ==
=== Politics ===
He has held several positions in the Pennsylvania Republican Party and local elected offices, including:

- Commissioner of Springfield Township, Montgomery County, from 1968 through 1971.
- Chairman of the Montgomery County Republican Committee 1978–86
- Delegate, Republican National Convention, Detroit 1980 and Dallas 1984
- State Chairman for Governor Dick Thornburgh’s re-election campaign in 1982

He maintains a close relationship with Tom Ridge, John Perzel, and many members of the Senate of Pennsylvania. He is known for being a successful fundraiser for Republican candidates.

=== 1987 conviction ===
While chairman of the Pennsylvania Republican Party Asher was convicted of perjury, racketeering, conspiracy and bribery in connection with a state contract award. He resigned after the conviction and served one year in federal prison. The case gained national attention in 1987 when his co-defendant in that case and political ally, Pennsylvania State Treasurer R. Budd Dwyer, shot and killed himself during a press conference the day before his sentencing.

=== Return to politics ===
Asher eventually returned to politics though he was not welcomed back in his home Montgomery County. To re-establish himself, in his first political move after being released from prison, Asher helped defeat the endorsed incumbent county commissioners in Montgomery County Paul Bartle and Flo Bloss in a primary election with Jon Fox and Mario Mele. Mele then spurned the GOP and made a power sharing pact with the Democrat Joe Hoeffel. The primary election between incumbents Bartle and Bloss, and Asher-recruited Mele and Fox in 1991 ignited a civil war in Montgomery County which rages even to this day and is often cited for the dysfunction of the Montgomery County Republican Party. Asher and was appointed Pennsylvania's Republican National Committeeman in 1998. By 2004, Asher, despite not being a candidate for office, was becoming an issue in GOP campaigns. That year, a developing feud between him and then Montgomery County District Attorney Bruce Castor spilled over into the campaign. After initially recruiting Castor to run for the position of Pennsylvania Attorney General, Asher moved to support former United States Attorney Tom Corbett. Castor claimed that this was retaliation for Asher's failed attempt to gain a seat on the board of SEPTA, the Southeastern Pennsylvania Transportation Authority. Castor worked to deny Asher the appointment due to a state law which has been used to deny political positions to individuals with felony convictions. The resulting campaign turned bitter with charges from Castor that Corbett's primary supporter was someone who had been convicted of bribery.

Asher and Castor again found themselves at odds with each other over the 2007 Montgomery County Commissioners race. After a contentious race for the nomination, Castor and incumbent Jim Matthews were selected as nominees. Castor refused to accept money from Asher. As a result, Matthews organized his own campaign fund to which Asher contributed. This support let to criticism of Matthews by Republicans, Democrats and his own running mate, Castor. All Montgomery County Republican politics is affected by the civil war which still rages with the factions being headed by Asher on the one side, and first long time GOP County Chair Frank Bartle and now former DA and current Commissioner Bruce Castor on the other. In a move reminiscent of 1991, Asher-backed County Commissioner Jim Matthews made a power sharing pact with (again) Democrat Joe Hoeffel to block Commissioner Castor from power.

Asher again became a campaign story when ABC News ran stories highlighting supporters of presidential candidate Rudy Giuliani who had past legal problems.

Despite the controversy, Asher has commented he has paid his debt to society following his conviction and has supported a number of Republican candidates over the years. He went on to chair Tom Corbett's successful campaign for governor in 2010.

Asher was slated to be a fake elector submitted to the United States Congress in order to overturn the 2020 United States presidential election in favor of Donald Trump, but was replaced before the failed scheme took place.

=== End of tenure as RNC member ===
In an email to state Republican committee members on November 18, 2020, former gubernatorial candidate Scott Wagner accused the longtime national committeeman of orchestrating “dirty politics” within the state party, suggesting the focus should remain on defending President Donald Trump during the impeachment hearings. After a bitter dispute erupted within the party, Asher dropped his bid for another four-year term as RNC member, saying that the dispute had become "destructive" within the party.

== Awards and recognitions ==
Asher was named to the PoliticsPA list of "Pennsylvania's Top Political Activists." The Pennsylvania Report named him to the 2003 "The Pennsylvania Report Power 75" list of influential figures in Pennsylvania politics and noted that he has the ability to put "a big bankroll behind his favorite candidates." The Pennsylvania Report's 2009 "The Pennsylvania Report 100" and noted that as a "veteran fund-raiser and kingmaker," Asher was "One, if not the, top power player in the state GOP."
