= 91st United States Congress =

1969–1971 U.S. Congress

←	90th	92nd	→
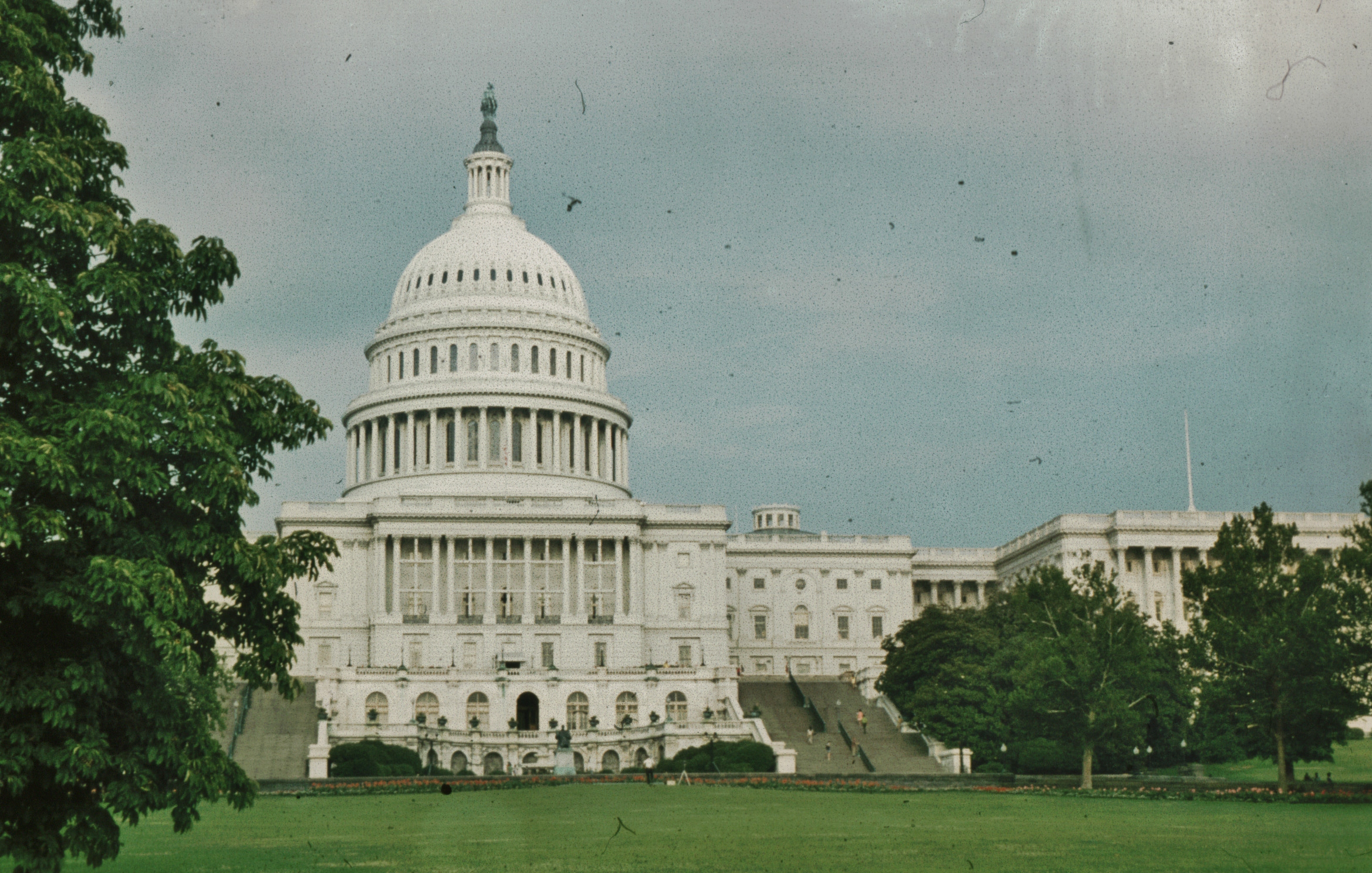
- United States Capitol (c. 1970)

Overview
- Legislative body: United States Congress
- Jurisdiction: United States
- Term: January 3, 1969 – January 3, 1971

Senate
- Members: 100
- President: Hubert Humphrey (D) (Note: U.S. Vice President Hubert Humphrey's term as President of the Senate ended at noon January 20, 1969, when Spiro Agnew's term began.) (until January 20, 1969); Spiro Agnew (R) (from January 20, 1969)
- President pro tempore: Richard Russell Jr. (D)
- Party control: Democratic

House of Representatives
- Members: 435
- Speaker: John W. McCormack (D)
- Party control: Democratic

Sessions
- 1st: January 3, 1969 – December 23, 1969
- 2nd: January 19, 1970 – January 2, 1971

The 91st United States Congress was a meeting of the legislative branch of the United States federal government, composed of the United States Senate and the United States House of Representatives. It met in Washington, D.C., from January 3, 1969, to January 3, 1971, during the final weeks of the presidency of Lyndon Johnson and the first two years of the presidency of Richard Nixon.

The apportionment of seats in this House of Representatives was based on the 1960 United States census.

Both chambers had a Democratic majority, though the party had lost its supermajority status in the Senate. With Richard Nixon being sworn in as president on January 20, 1969, this ended the Democrats' overall federal government trifecta that they had held since the 87th Congress.

== Major events ==
- January 20, 1969: Richard M. Nixon became 37th President of the United States.
- July 20, 1969: Space Race: Apollo 11 lands on the Moon's surface, the first human landing on Moon.
- November 15, 1969: Vietnam War: In Washington, D.C., 250,000–500,000 protesters stage a peaceful demonstration against the war, including a symbolic "March Against Death".
- December 1, 1969: Vietnam War: The first draft lottery in the United States is held since World War II.
- November 30, 1970: The 1969–1970 recession ends.

== Major legislation ==
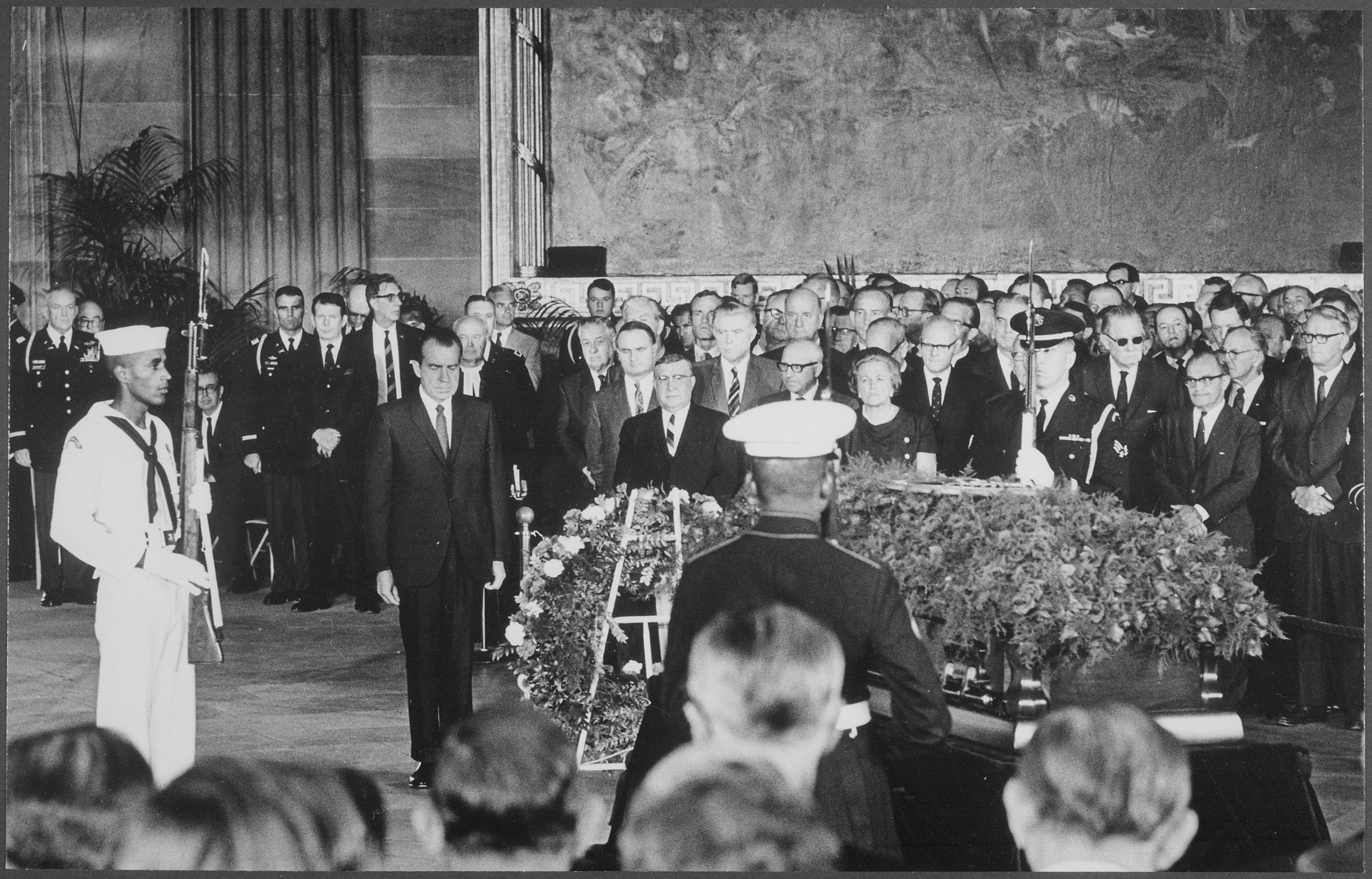
President Richard Nixon paying his last tributes to Sen. Everett Dirksen, who died September 7, 1969.

- June 17, 1969: Public Health Cigarette Smoking Act, Pub. L. 91–222
- December 30, 1969: Tax Reform Act of 1969, Pub. L. 91–172
- December 30, 1969: Federal Coal Mine Health and Safety Act of 1969, Pub. L. 91–173
- January 1, 1970: National Environmental Policy Act, Pub. L. 91–190
- April 3, 1970: Environmental Quality Improvement Act, Pub. L. 91–224
- May 21, 1970: Airport and Airway Development Act of 1970, Pub. L. 91–258, title I
- August 12, 1970: Postal Reorganization Act (United States Postal Service), Pub. L. 91–375
- August 15, 1970: Economic Stabilization Act of 1970, Title II of Pub. L. 91–379, 84 Stat. 799
- September 22, 1970: District of Columbia Delegate Act, Pub. L. 91–405
- October 15, 1970: Organized Crime Control Act of 1970, Pub. L. 91–452 (including the Racketeer Influenced and Corrupt Organizations Act ("RICO")
- October 15, 1970: Urban Mass Transportation Act of 1970, Pub. L. 91–453
- October 26, 1970: Bank Secrecy Act, Pub. L. 91–508
- October 26, 1970: Legislative Reorganization Act of 1970
- October 27, 1970: Controlled Substances Act, Pub. L. 91–513
- October 30, 1970: Rail Passenger Service Act (Amtrak), Pub. L. 91–518
- December 24, 1970: Family Planning Services and Population Research Act of 1970, Pub. L. 91–572
- December 24, 1970: Plant Variety Protection Act of 1970, Pub. L. 91–577
- December 29, 1970: Occupational Safety and Health Act (OSHA), Pub. L. 91–596
- December 31, 1970: Clean Air Act Extension, Pub. L. 91–604
- December 31, 1970: Housing and Urban Development Act of 1970, Pub. L. 91–609, including title VII, National Urban Policy and New Community Development Act of 1970
- January 12, 1971: Foreign Military Sales Act of 1971, Pub. L. 91–672
- January 13, 1971: Lead-Based Paint Poisoning Prevention Act, Pub. L. 91–695

== Party summary ==
The count below identifies party affiliations at the beginning of the first session of this Congress, and includes members from vacancies and newly admitted states, when they were first seated. Changes resulting from subsequent replacements are shown below in the "Changes in membership" section.

=== Senate ===
Party standings on the opening day of the 91st Congress 57 Democratic senators 43 Republican senators

	Party (shading shows control)			Total	Vacant
	Democratic (D)	Republican (R)	Other (O)	Total	Vacant
End of previous congress	62	38	0	100	0
Begin	57	43	0	100	0
End	59	41	0	100	0
Final voting share	59.0%	41.0%	0.0%		
Beginning of next congress	54	44	2 (Note: Conservative Party of New York, Independent)	100	0

=== House of Representatives ===
	Party (shading shows control)		Total	Vacant
	Democratic (D)	Republican (R)	Total	Vacant
End of previous congress	247	186	433	2
Begin	243	192	435	0
End	242	189	431	4
Final voting share	56.1%	43.9%		
Beginning of next congress	254	180	434	1

== Leadership ==
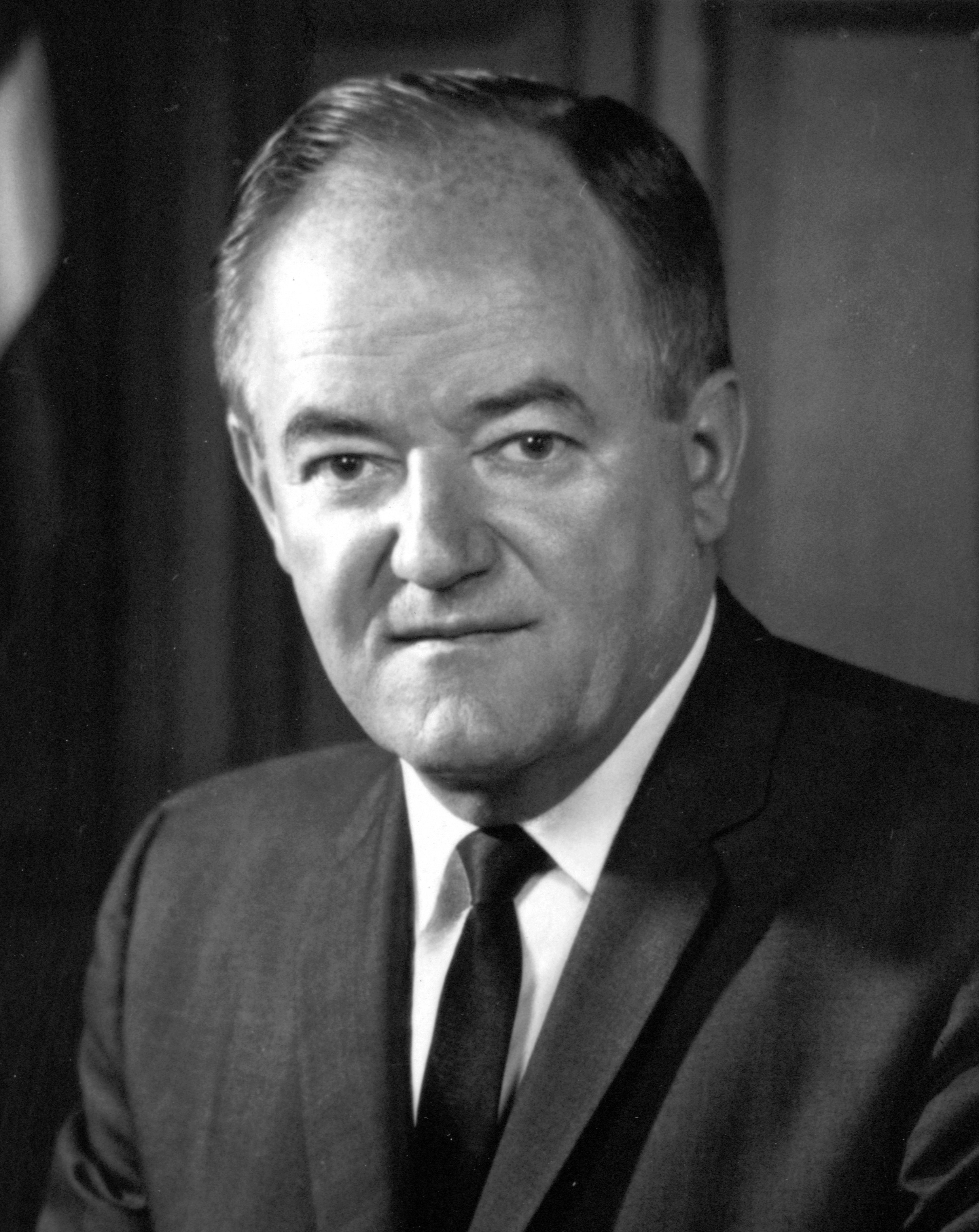
Senate President Hubert Humphrey

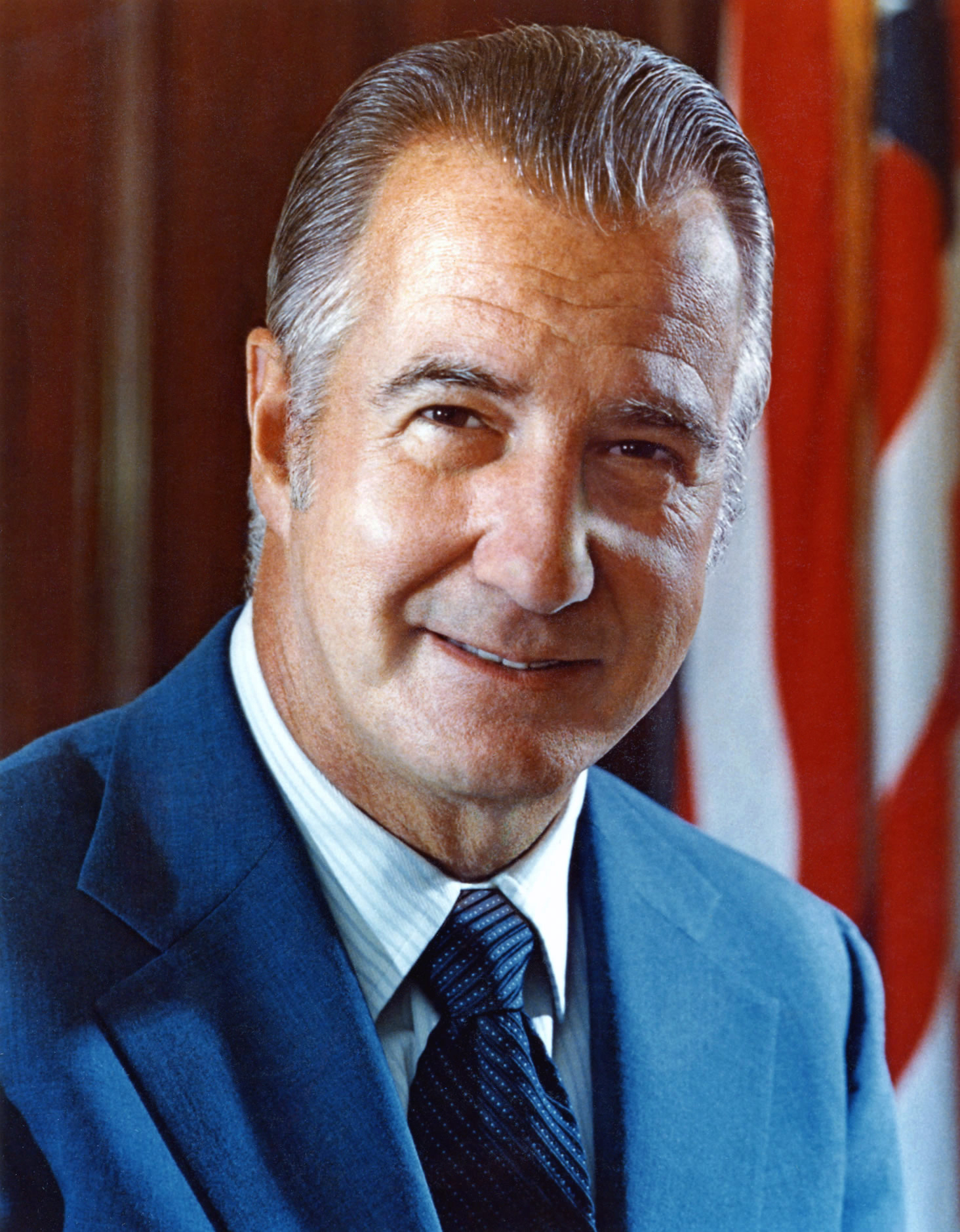
Senate President Spiro Agnew

=== Senate ===
- President: Hubert Humphrey (D), until January 20, 1969
  - Spiro Agnew (R), from January 20, 1969
- President pro tempore: Richard Russell Jr. (D)
- Permanent Acting President pro tempore: Lee Metcalf (D)

==== Majority (Democratic) leadership ====
- Majority Leader: Mike Mansfield
- Majority Whip: Ted Kennedy
- Caucus Secretary: Robert Byrd

==== Minority (Republican) leadership ====
- Minority Leader: Everett Dirksen, until September 7, 1969
  - Hugh Scott, from September 24, 1969
- Minority Whip: Hugh Scott, until September 24, 1969
  - Robert P. Griffin, from September 24, 1969
- Republican Conference Chairman: Margaret Chase Smith
- Republican Conference Secretary: Milton Young
- National Senatorial Committee Chair: John Tower
- Policy Committee Chairman: Gordon Allott

=== House of Representatives ===
- Speaker: John W. McCormack (D)

==== Majority (Democratic) leadership ====
- Majority Leader: Carl Albert
- Majority Whip: Hale Boggs
- Democratic Caucus Chairman: Dan Rostenkowski
- Democratic Caucus Secretary: Leonor Sullivan
- Democratic Campaign Committee Chairman: Michael A. Feighan

==== Minority (Republican) leadership ====
- Minority Leader: Gerald Ford
- Minority Whip: Leslie C. Arends
- Republican Conference Chairman: John B. Anderson
- Republican Conference Secretary: Richard H. Poff
- Policy Committee Chairman: John Jacob Rhodes
- Republican Campaign Committee Chairman: Bob Wilson

== Caucuses ==
- House Democratic Caucus
- Senate Democratic Caucus

== Members ==
This list is arranged by chamber, then by state. Senators are listed by class, and representatives are listed by district.

=== Senate ===
Senators are popularly elected statewide every two years, with one-third beginning new six-year terms with each Congress. Preceding the names in the list below are Senate class numbers, which indicate the cycle of their election. In this Congress, Class 1 meant their term ended with this Congress, requiring re-election in 1970; Class 2 meant their term began in the last Congress, requiring re-election in 1972; and Class 3 meant their term began in this Congress, requiring re-election in 1974.

==== Alabama ====
▌2. John Sparkman (D)
▌3. James Allen (D)

==== Alaska ====
▌2. Ted Stevens (R)
▌3. Mike Gravel (D)

==== Arizona ====
▌1. Paul Fannin (R)
▌3. Barry Goldwater (R)

==== Arkansas ====
▌2. John L. McClellan (D)
▌3. J. William Fulbright (D)

==== California ====
▌1. George Murphy (R), until January 2, 1971

▌John V. Tunney (D), from January 2, 1971

▌3. Alan Cranston (D)

==== Colorado ====
▌2. Gordon Allott (R)
▌3. Peter H. Dominick (R)

==== Connecticut ====
▌1. Thomas J. Dodd (D)
▌3. Abraham Ribicoff (D)

==== Delaware ====
▌1. John J. Williams (R), until December 30, 1970

▌William Roth (R), from January 1, 1971

▌2. J. Caleb Boggs (R)

==== Florida ====
▌1. Spessard Holland (D)
▌3. Edward Gurney (R)

==== Georgia ====
▌2. Richard Russell Jr. (D)
▌3. Herman Talmadge (D)

==== Hawaii ====
▌1. Hiram Fong (R)
▌3. Daniel Inouye (D)

==== Idaho ====
▌2. Len Jordan (R)
▌3. Frank Church (D)

==== Illinois ====
▌2. Charles H. Percy (R)
▌3. Everett Dirksen (R), until September 7, 1969

▌Ralph Tyler Smith (R), September 17, 1969 - November 3, 1970
▌Adlai Stevenson III (D), from November 17, 1970

==== Indiana ====
▌1. Vance Hartke (D)
▌3. Birch Bayh (D)

==== Iowa ====
▌2. Jack Miller (R)
▌3. Harold Hughes (D)

==== Kansas ====
▌2. James B. Pearson (R)
▌3. Bob Dole (R)

==== Kentucky ====
▌2. John Sherman Cooper (R)
▌3. Marlow Cook (R)

==== Louisiana ====
▌2. Allen J. Ellender (D)
▌3. Russell B. Long (D)

==== Maine ====
▌1. Edmund Muskie (D)
▌2. Margaret Chase Smith (R)

==== Maryland ====
▌1. Joseph Tydings (D)
▌3. Charles Mathias (R)

==== Massachusetts ====
▌1. Ted Kennedy (D)
▌2. Edward Brooke (R)

==== Michigan ====
▌1. Philip Hart (D)
▌2. Robert P. Griffin (R)

==== Minnesota ====
▌1. Eugene McCarthy (DFL) (Note: The Minnesota Democratic–Farmer–Labor Party (DFL) and the North Dakota Democratic-Nonpartisan League Party (D-NPL) are the Minnesota and North Dakota affiliates of the U.S. Democratic Party and are counted as Democrats.)
▌2. Walter Mondale (DFL)

==== Mississippi ====
▌1. John C. Stennis (D)
▌2. James Eastland (D)

==== Missouri ====
▌1. Stuart Symington (D)
▌3. Thomas Eagleton (D)

==== Montana ====
▌1. Mike Mansfield (D)
▌2. Lee Metcalf (D)

==== Nebraska ====
▌1. Roman Hruska (R)
▌2. Carl Curtis (R)

==== Nevada ====
▌1. Howard Cannon (D)
▌3. Alan Bible (D)

==== New Hampshire ====
▌2. Thomas J. McIntyre (D)
▌3. Norris Cotton (R)

==== New Jersey ====
▌1. Harrison A. Williams (D)
▌2. Clifford P. Case (R)

==== New Mexico ====
▌1. Joseph Montoya (D)
▌2. Clinton P. Anderson (D)

==== New York ====
▌1. Charles Goodell (R)
▌3. Jacob Javits (R)

==== North Carolina ====
▌2. B. Everett Jordan (D)
▌3. Sam Ervin (D)

==== North Dakota ====
▌1. Quentin Burdick (D-NPL)
▌3. Milton Young (R)

==== Ohio ====
▌1. Stephen M. Young (D)
▌3. William B. Saxbe (R)

==== Oklahoma ====
▌2. Fred R. Harris (D)
▌3. Henry Bellmon (R)

==== Oregon ====
▌2. Mark Hatfield (R)
▌3. Bob Packwood (R)

==== Pennsylvania ====
▌1. Hugh Scott (R)
▌3. Richard Schweiker (R)

==== Rhode Island ====
▌1. John Pastore (D)
▌2. Claiborne Pell (D)

==== South Carolina ====
▌2. Strom Thurmond (R)
▌3. Fritz Hollings (D)

==== South Dakota ====
▌2. Karl E. Mundt (R)
▌3. George McGovern (D)

==== Tennessee ====
▌1. Albert Gore Sr. (D)
▌2. Howard Baker (R)

==== Texas ====
▌1. Ralph Yarborough (D)
▌2. John Tower (R)

==== Utah ====
▌1. Frank Moss (D)
▌3. Wallace F. Bennett (R)

==== Vermont ====
▌1. Winston L. Prouty (R)
▌3. George Aiken (R)

==== Virginia ====
▌1. Harry F. Byrd Jr. (D)
▌2. William B. Spong Jr. (D)

==== Washington ====
▌1. Henry M. Jackson (D)
▌3. Warren G. Magnuson (D)

==== West Virginia ====
▌1. Robert Byrd (D)
▌2. Jennings Randolph (D)

==== Wisconsin ====
▌1. William Proxmire (D)
▌3. Gaylord Nelson (D)

==== Wyoming ====
▌1. Gale W. McGee (D)
▌2. Clifford Hansen (R)

Senators' party membership by state at the opening of the 91st Congress in January 1969 2 Democrats 1 Democrat and 1 Republican 2 Republicans

=== House of Representatives ===
Some representatives were elected statewide on the general ticket or otherwise at-large, and others were elected from districts, as listed here as the districts existed at this time.

==== Alabama ====
▌1. Jack Edwards (R)
▌2. William Louis Dickinson (R)
▌3. George W. Andrews (D)
▌4. Bill Nichols (D)
▌5. Walter Flowers (D)
▌6. John Hall Buchanan Jr. (R)
▌7. Tom Bevill (D)
▌8. Robert E. Jones Jr. (D)

==== Alaska ====
▌At-large. Howard Wallace Pollock (R)

==== Arizona ====
▌1. John Jacob Rhodes (R)
▌2. Mo Udall (D)
▌3. Sam Steiger (R)

==== Arkansas ====
▌1. William Vollie Alexander Jr. (D)
▌2. Wilbur Mills (D)
▌3. John Paul Hammerschmidt (R)
▌4. David Pryor (D)

==== California ====
▌1. Donald H. Clausen (R)
▌2. Harold T. Johnson (D)
▌3. John E. Moss (D)
▌4. Robert L. Leggett (D)
▌5. Phillip Burton (D)
▌6. William S. Mailliard (R)
▌7. Jeffery Cohelan (D)
▌8. George P. Miller (D)
▌9. Don Edwards (D)
▌10. Charles Gubser (R)
▌11. Pete McCloskey (R)
▌12. Burt Talcott (R)
▌13. Charles M. Teague (R)
▌14. Jerome Waldie (D)
▌15. John J. McFall (D)
▌16. B. F. Sisk (D)
▌17. Glenn M. Anderson (D)
▌18. Bob Mathias (R)
▌19. Chester E. Holifield (D)
▌20. H. Allen Smith (R)
▌21. Augustus Hawkins (D)
▌22. James C. Corman (D)
▌23. Del M. Clawson (R)
▌24. Glenard P. Lipscomb (R), until February 1, 1970

▌John H. Rousselot (R), from June 30, 1970

▌25. Charles E. Wiggins (R)
▌26. Thomas M. Rees (D)
▌27. Edwin Reinecke (R), until January 21, 1969

▌Barry Goldwater Jr. (R), from April 29, 1969

▌28. Alphonzo E. Bell Jr. (R)
▌29. George Brown Jr. (D)
▌30. Edward R. Roybal (D)
▌31. Charles H. Wilson (D)
▌32. Craig Hosmer (R)
▌33. Jerry Pettis (R)
▌34. Richard T. Hanna (D)
▌35. James B. Utt (R), until March 1, 1970

▌John G. Schmitz (R), from June 30, 1970

▌36. Bob Wilson (R)
▌37. Lionel Van Deerlin (D)
▌38. John V. Tunney (D), until January 2, 1971

==== Colorado ====
▌1. Byron G. Rogers (D)
▌2. Donald G. Brotzman (R)
▌3. Frank Evans (D)
▌4. Wayne N. Aspinall (D)

==== Connecticut ====
▌1. Emilio Q. Daddario (D)
▌2. William St. Onge (D), until May 1, 1970

▌Robert H. Steele (R), from November 3, 1970

▌3. Robert Giaimo (D)
▌4. Lowell Weicker (R)
▌5. John S. Monagan (D)
▌6. Thomas Meskill (R)

==== Delaware ====
▌At-large. William Roth (R), until December 31, 1970

==== Florida ====
▌1. Robert L. F. Sikes (D)
▌2. Don Fuqua (D)
▌3. Charles E. Bennett (D)
▌4. Bill Chappell (D)
▌5. Louis Frey Jr. (R)
▌6. Sam Gibbons (D)
▌7. James A. Haley (D)
▌8. William C. Cramer (R)
▌9. Paul Rogers (D)
▌10. J. Herbert Burke (R)
▌11. Claude Pepper (D)
▌12. Dante Fascell (D)

==== Georgia ====
▌1. George Elliott Hagan (D)
▌2. Maston E. O'Neal Jr. (D)
▌3. Jack Brinkley (D)
▌4. Benjamin B. Blackburn (R)
▌5. Fletcher Thompson (R)
▌6. John Flynt (D)
▌7. John William Davis (D)
▌8. W. S. Stuckey Jr. (D)
▌9. Phillip M. Landrum (D)
▌10. Robert Grier Stephens Jr. (D)

==== Hawaii ====
Both members were elected statewide on a general ticket.

▌At-large. Spark Matsunaga (D)
▌At-large. Patsy Mink (D)

==== Idaho ====
▌1. James A. McClure (R)
▌2. Orval H. Hansen (R)

==== Illinois ====
▌1. William L. Dawson (D), until November 9, 1970
▌2. Abner J. Mikva (D)
▌3. William T. Murphy (D)
▌4. Ed Derwinski (R)
▌5. John C. Kluczynski (D)
▌6. Daniel J. Ronan (D), until August 13, 1969

▌George W. Collins (D), from November 3, 1970

▌7. Frank Annunzio (D)
▌8. Dan Rostenkowski (D)
▌9. Sidney R. Yates (D)
▌10. Harold R. Collier (R)
▌11. Roman Pucinski (D)
▌12. Robert McClory (R)
▌13. Donald Rumsfeld (R), until May 25, 1969

▌Phil Crane (R), from November 25, 1969

▌14. John N. Erlenborn (R)
▌15. Charlotte Thompson Reid (R)
▌16. John B. Anderson (R)
▌17. Leslie C. Arends (R)
▌18. Robert H. Michel (R)
▌19. Tom Railsback (R)
▌20. Paul Findley (R)
▌21. Kenneth J. Gray (D)
▌22. William L. Springer (R)
▌23. George E. Shipley (D)
▌24. Melvin Price (D)

==== Indiana ====
▌1. Ray Madden (D)
▌2. Earl Landgrebe (R)
▌3. John Brademas (D)
▌4. E. Ross Adair (R)
▌5. Richard L. Roudebush (R)
▌6. William G. Bray (R)
▌7. John T. Myers (R)
▌8. Roger H. Zion (R)
▌9. Lee H. Hamilton (D)
▌10. David W. Dennis (R)
▌11. Andrew Jacobs Jr. (D)

==== Iowa ====
▌1. Fred Schwengel (R)
▌2. John Culver (D)
▌3. H. R. Gross (R)
▌4. John Henry Kyl (R)
▌5. Neal Edward Smith (D)
▌6. Wiley Mayne (R)
▌7. William J. Scherle (R)

==== Kansas ====
▌1. Keith Sebelius (R)
▌2. Chester L. Mize (R)
▌3. Larry Winn (R)
▌4. Garner E. Shriver (R)
▌5. Joe Skubitz (R)

==== Kentucky ====
▌1. Frank Stubblefield (D)
▌2. William Natcher (D)
▌3. William Cowger (R)
▌4. Gene Snyder (R)
▌5. Tim Lee Carter (R)
▌6. John C. Watts (D)
▌7. Carl D. Perkins (D)

==== Louisiana ====
▌1. F. Edward Hébert (D)
▌2. Hale Boggs (D)
▌3. Patrick T. Caffery (D)
▌4. Joe Waggonner (D)
▌5. Otto Passman (D)
▌6. John Rarick (D)
▌7. Edwin Edwards (D)
▌8. Speedy Long (D)

==== Maine ====
▌1. Peter Kyros (D)
▌2. William Hathaway (D)

==== Maryland ====
▌1. Rogers Morton (R)
▌2. Clarence Long (D)
▌3. Edward Garmatz (D)
▌4. George Hyde Fallon (D)
▌5. Lawrence Hogan (R)
▌6. J. Glenn Beall Jr. (R)
▌7. Samuel Friedel (D)
▌8. Gilbert Gude (R)

==== Massachusetts ====
▌1. Silvio O. Conte (R)
▌2. Edward Boland (D)
▌3. Philip J. Philbin (D)
▌4. Harold Donohue (D)
▌5. F. Bradford Morse (R)
▌6. William H. Bates (R), until June 22, 1969

▌Michael J. Harrington (D), from September 30, 1969

▌7. Torbert Macdonald (D)
▌8. Tip O'Neill (D)
▌9. John W. McCormack (D)
▌10. Margaret Heckler (R)
▌11. James A. Burke (D)
▌12. Hastings Keith (R)

==== Michigan ====
▌1. John Conyers (D)
▌2. Marvin L. Esch (R)
▌3. Garry E. Brown (R)
▌4. J. Edward Hutchinson (R)
▌5. Gerald Ford (R)
▌6. Charles E. Chamberlain (R)
▌7. Donald Riegle (R)
▌8. R. James Harvey (R)
▌9. Guy Vander Jagt (R)
▌10. Elford Albin Cederberg (R)
▌11. Philip Ruppe (R)
▌12. James G. O'Hara (D)
▌13. Charles Diggs (D)
▌14. Lucien Nedzi (D)
▌15. William D. Ford (D)
▌16. John D. Dingell Jr. (D)
▌17. Martha Griffiths (D)
▌18. William Broomfield (R)
▌19. Jack H. McDonald (R)

==== Minnesota ====
▌1. Al Quie (R)
▌2. Ancher Nelsen (R)
▌3. Clark MacGregor (R)
▌4. Joseph Karth (DFL)
▌5. Donald M. Fraser (DFL)
▌6. John M. Zwach (R)
▌7. Odin Langen (R)
▌8. John Blatnik (DFL)

==== Mississippi ====
▌1. Thomas Abernethy (D)
▌2. Jamie L. Whitten (D)
▌3. Charles H. Griffin (D)
▌4. Sonny Montgomery (D)
▌5. William M. Colmer (D)

==== Missouri ====
▌1. Bill Clay (D)
▌2. James W. Symington (D)
▌3. Leonor Sullivan (D)
▌4. William J. Randall (D)
▌5. Richard Walker Bolling (D)
▌6. William Raleigh Hull Jr. (D)
▌7. Durward Gorham Hall (R)
▌8. Richard Howard Ichord Jr. (D)
▌9. William L. Hungate (D)
▌10. Bill Burlison (D)

==== Montana ====
▌1. Arnold Olsen (D)
▌2. James F. Battin (R), until February 27, 1969

▌John Melcher (D), from June 24, 1969

==== Nebraska ====
▌1. Robert Vernon Denney (R)
▌2. Glenn Cunningham (R)
▌3. David Martin (R)

==== Nevada ====
▌At-large. Walter S. Baring Jr. (D)

==== New Hampshire ====
▌1. Louis C. Wyman (R)
▌2. James Colgate Cleveland (R)

==== New Jersey ====
▌1. John E. Hunt (R)
▌2. Charles W. Sandman Jr. (R)
▌3. James J. Howard (D)
▌4. Frank Thompson (D)
▌5. Peter Frelinghuysen Jr. (R)
▌6. William T. Cahill (R), until January 19, 1970

▌Edwin B. Forsythe (R), from November 3, 1970

▌7. William B. Widnall (R)
▌8. Charles Samuel Joelson (D), until September 4, 1969

▌Robert A. Roe (D), from November 4, 1969

▌9. Henry Helstoski (D)
▌10. Peter W. Rodino (D)
▌11. Joseph Minish (D)
▌12. Florence P. Dwyer (R)
▌13. Cornelius Gallagher (D)
▌14. Dominick V. Daniels (D)
▌15. Edward J. Patten (D)

==== New Mexico ====
▌1. Manuel Lujan Jr. (R)
▌2. Ed Foreman (R)

==== New York ====
▌1. Otis G. Pike (D)
▌2. James R. Grover Jr. (R)
▌3. Lester L. Wolff (D)
▌4. John W. Wydler (R)
▌5. Allard K. Lowenstein (D)
▌6. Seymour Halpern (R)
▌7. Joseph P. Addabbo (D)
▌8. Benjamin Stanley Rosenthal (D)
▌9. James J. Delaney (D)
▌10. Emanuel Celler (D)
▌11. Frank J. Brasco (D)
▌12. Shirley Chisholm (D)
▌13. Bertram L. Podell (D)
▌14. John J. Rooney (D)
▌15. Hugh Carey (D)
▌16. John M. Murphy (D)
▌17. Ed Koch (D)
▌18. Adam Clayton Powell Jr. (D)
▌19. Leonard Farbstein (D)
▌20. William Fitts Ryan (D)
▌21. James H. Scheuer (D)
▌22. Jacob H. Gilbert (D)
▌23. Jonathan Brewster Bingham (D)
▌24. Mario Biaggi (D)
▌25. Richard Ottinger (D)
▌26. Ogden Reid (R)
▌27. Martin B. McKneally (R)
▌28. Hamilton Fish IV (R)
▌29. Daniel E. Button (R)
▌30. Carleton J. King (R)
▌31. Robert C. McEwen (R)
▌32. Alexander Pirnie (R)
▌33. Howard W. Robison (R)
▌34. James M. Hanley (D)
▌35. Samuel S. Stratton (D)
▌36. Frank Horton (R)
▌37. Barber Conable (R)
▌38. James F. Hastings (R)
▌39. Richard D. McCarthy (D)
▌40. Henry P. Smith III (R)
▌41. Thaddeus J. Dulski (D)

==== North Carolina ====
▌1. Walter B. Jones Sr. (D)
▌2. Lawrence H. Fountain (D)
▌3. David N. Henderson (D)
▌4. Nick Galifianakis (D)
▌5. Wilmer Mizell (R)
▌6. L. Richardson Preyer (D)
▌7. Alton Lennon (D)
▌8. Earl B. Ruth (R)
▌9. Charles R. Jonas (R)
▌10. Jim Broyhill (R)
▌11. Roy A. Taylor (D)

==== North Dakota ====
▌1. Mark Andrews (R)
▌2. Thomas S. Kleppe (R)

==== Ohio ====
▌1. Robert Taft Jr. (R)
▌2. Donald D. Clancy (R)
▌3. Charles W. Whalen Jr. (R)
▌4. William Moore McCulloch (R)
▌5. Del Latta (R)
▌6. Bill Harsha (R)
▌7. Bud Brown (R)
▌8. Jackson Edward Betts (R)
▌9. Thomas L. Ashley (D)
▌10. Clarence E. Miller (R)
▌11. J. William Stanton (R)
▌12. Samuel L. Devine (R)
▌13. Charles Adams Mosher (R)
▌14. William Hanes Ayres (R)
▌15. Chalmers Wylie (R)
▌16. Frank T. Bow (R)
▌17. John M. Ashbrook (R)
▌18. Wayne Hays (D)
▌19. Michael J. Kirwan (D), until July 27, 1970

▌Charles J. Carney (D), from November 3, 1970

▌20. Michael A. Feighan (D)
▌21. Louis Stokes (D)
▌22. Charles Vanik (D)
▌23. William Edwin Minshall Jr. (R)
▌24. Buz Lukens (R)

==== Oklahoma ====
▌1. Page Belcher (R)
▌2. Ed Edmondson (D)
▌3. Carl Albert (D)
▌4. Tom Steed (D)
▌5. John Jarman (D)
▌6. John Newbold Camp (R)

==== Oregon ====
▌1. Wendell Wyatt (R)
▌2. Al Ullman (D)
▌3. Edith Green (D)
▌4. John R. Dellenback (R)

==== Pennsylvania ====
▌1. William A. Barrett (D)
▌2. Robert N. C. Nix Sr. (D)
▌3. James A. Byrne (D)
▌4. Joshua Eilberg (D)
▌5. William J. Green III (D)
▌6. Gus Yatron (D)
▌7. Lawrence G. Williams (R)
▌8. Edward G. Biester Jr. (R)
▌9. George Watkins (R), until August 7, 1970

▌John H. Ware III (R), from November 3, 1970

▌10. Joseph M. McDade (R)
▌11. Dan Flood (D)
▌12. J. Irving Whalley (R)
▌13. Lawrence Coughlin (R)
▌14. William S. Moorhead (D)
▌15. Fred B. Rooney (D)
▌16. Edwin Duing Eshleman (R)
▌17. Herman T. Schneebeli (R)
▌18. Robert J. Corbett (R)
▌19. George Atlee Goodling (R)
▌20. Joseph M. Gaydos (D)
▌21. John Herman Dent (D)
▌22. John P. Saylor (R)
▌23. Albert W. Johnson (R)
▌24. Joseph P. Vigorito (D)
▌25. Frank M. Clark (D)
▌26. Thomas E. Morgan (D)
▌27. James G. Fulton (R)

==== Rhode Island ====
▌1. Fernand St Germain (D)
▌2. Robert Tiernan (D)

==== South Carolina ====
▌1. L. Mendel Rivers (D), until December 28, 1970
▌2. Albert Watson (R)
▌3. William Jennings Bryan Dorn (D)
▌4. James Mann (D)
▌5. Thomas S. Gettys (D)
▌6. John L. McMillan (D)

==== South Dakota ====
▌1. Ben Reifel (R)
▌2. Ellis Yarnal Berry (R)

==== Tennessee ====
▌1. Jimmy Quillen (R)
▌2. John Duncan Sr. (R)
▌3. Bill Brock (R)
▌4. Joe L. Evins (D)
▌5. Richard Fulton (D)
▌6. William Anderson (D)
▌7. Ray Blanton (D)
▌8. Fats Everett (D), until January 26, 1969

▌Ed Jones (D), from March 25, 1969

▌9. Dan Kuykendall (R)

==== Texas ====
▌1. Wright Patman (D)
▌2. John Dowdy (D)
▌3. James M. Collins (R)
▌4. Ray Roberts (D)
▌5. Earle Cabell (D)
▌6. Olin E. Teague (D)
▌7. George H. W. Bush (R)
▌8. Robert C. Eckhardt (D)
▌9. Jack Brooks (D)
▌10. J. J. Pickle (D)
▌11. William R. Poage (D)
▌12. Jim Wright (D)
▌13. Graham B. Purcell Jr. (D)
▌14. John Andrew Young (D)
▌15. Kika de la Garza (D)
▌16. Richard Crawford White (D)
▌17. Omar Burleson (D)
▌18. Bob Price (R)
▌19. George H. Mahon (D)
▌20. Henry B. González (D)
▌21. O. C. Fisher (D)
▌22. Robert R. Casey (D)
▌23. Abraham Kazen (D)

==== Utah ====
▌1. Laurence J. Burton (R)
▌2. Sherman P. Lloyd (R)

==== Vermont ====
▌At-large. Robert Stafford (R)

==== Virginia ====
▌1. Thomas N. Downing (D)
▌2. G. William Whitehurst (R)
▌3. David E. Satterfield III (D)
▌4. Watkins Moorman Abbitt (D)
▌5. Dan Daniel (D)
▌6. Richard Harding Poff (R)
▌7. John Otho Marsh Jr. (D)
▌8. William L. Scott (R)
▌9. William C. Wampler (R)
▌10. Joel Broyhill (R)

==== Washington ====
▌1. Thomas Pelly (R)
▌2. Lloyd Meeds (D)
▌3. Julia Butler Hansen (D)
▌4. Catherine Dean May (R)
▌5. Tom Foley (D)
▌6. Floyd Hicks (D)
▌7. Brock Adams (D)

==== West Virginia ====
▌1. Bob Mollohan (D)
▌2. Harley Orrin Staggers (D)
▌3. John M. Slack Jr. (D)
▌4. Ken Hechler (D)
▌5. James Kee (D)

==== Wisconsin ====
▌1. Henry C. Schadeberg (R)
▌2. Robert Kastenmeier (D)
▌3. Vernon Wallace Thomson (R)
▌4. Clement J. Zablocki (D)
▌5. Henry S. Reuss (D)
▌6. William A. Steiger (R)
▌7. Melvin Laird (R), until January 21, 1969

▌Dave Obey (D), from April 1, 1969

▌8. John W. Byrnes (R)
▌9. Glenn Robert Davis (R)
▌10. Alvin O'Konski (R)

==== Wyoming ====
▌At-large. John S. Wold (R)

==== Delegates ====
▌▌Puerto Rico at-large. Jorge Luis Córdova (Resident Commissioner) (PNP/D)

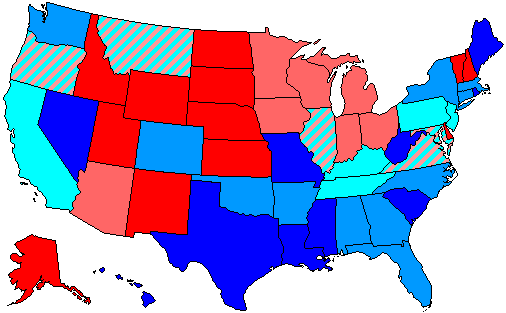
House seats by party holding plurality in state: 80+% Democratic / 80+% Republican; 60+% to 80% Democratic / 60+% to 80% Republican; Up to 60% Democratic / Up to 60% Republican

== Changes in membership ==
The count below reflects changes from the beginning of the first session of this Congress

=== Senate ===
- Replacements: 3
  - Democratic: 2 seat net gain
  - Republican: 2 seat net loss
- Deaths: 1
- Resignations: 2
- Total seats with changes: 3

Senate changes
State (class)	Vacated by	Reason for change	Successor	Date of successor's formal installation (Note: When seated or oath administered, not necessarily when service began.)
Illinois (3)	Everett Dirksen (R)	Died September 7, 1969	Ralph Tyler Smith (R)	September 17, 1969
Illinois (3)	Ralph Tyler Smith (R)	Successor elected November 3, 1970	Adlai Stevenson III (D)	November 17, 1970
Delaware (1)	John J. Williams (R)	Resigned December 30, 1970	William Roth (R)	January 1, 1971
California (1)	George Murphy (R)	Resigned January 2, 1971	John V. Tunney (D)	January 2, 1971

=== House of Representatives ===
- Replacements: 14
  - Democratic: 2 seat net gain
  - Republican: 2 seat net loss
- Deaths: 10
- Resignations: 8
- Total seats with changes: 18

House changes
District	Vacated by	Reason for change	Successor	Date of successor's formal installation
California 27th	Edwin Reinecke (R)	Resigned January 21, 1969, after becoming Lieutenant Governor of California	Barry Goldwater Jr. (R)	April 29, 1969
Wisconsin 7th	Melvin Laird (R)	Resigned January 21, 1969, after being appointed United States Secretary of Defense	Dave Obey (D)	April 1, 1969
Tennessee 8th	Fats Everett (D)	Died January 26, 1969	Ed Jones (D)	March 25, 1969
Montana 2nd	James F. Battin (R)	Resigned February 27, 1969, after being appointed judge for the US District Court for the District of Montana	John Melcher (D)	June 24, 1969
Illinois 13th	Donald Rumsfeld (R)	Resigned May 25, 1969, after being appointed Director of the Office of Economic Opportunity	Phil Crane (R)	November 25, 1969
Massachusetts 6th	William H. Bates (R)	Died June 22, 1969	Michael J. Harrington (D)	September 30, 1969
Illinois 6th	Daniel J. Ronan (D)	Died August 13, 1969	George W. Collins (D)	November 3, 1970
New Jersey 8th	Charles Samuel Joelson (D)	Resigned September 4, 1969, after becoming judge of Superior Court of New Jersey	Robert A. Roe (D)	November 4, 1969
New Jersey 6th	William T. Cahill (R)	Resigned January 19, 1970, after becoming Governor of New Jersey	Edwin B. Forsythe (R)	November 3, 1970
California 24th	Glenard P. Lipscomb (R)	Died February 1, 1970	John H. Rousselot (R)	June 30, 1970
California 35th	James B. Utt (R)	Died March 1, 1970	John G. Schmitz (R)	June 30, 1970
Connecticut 2nd	William St. Onge (D)	Died May 1, 1970	Robert H. Steele (R)	November 3, 1970
Ohio 19th	Michael J. Kirwan (D)	Died July 27, 1970	Charles J. Carney (D)	November 3, 1970
Pennsylvania 9th	George Watkins (R)	Died August 7, 1970	John H. Ware III (R)	November 3, 1970
Illinois 1st	William L. Dawson (D)	Died November 9, 1970	Vacant	Not filled this term
South Carolina 1st	L. Mendel Rivers (D)	Died December 28, 1970	Vacant	Not filled this term
Delaware at-large	William Roth (R)	Resigned December 31, 1970, after being appointed to the U.S. Senate	Vacant	Not filled this term
California 38th	John V. Tunney (D)	Resigned January 2, 1971, after being appointed to the U.S. Senate	Vacant	Not filled this term

== Committees ==
Lists of committees and their party leaders for members of the House and Senate committees can be found through the Official Congressional Directory at the bottom of this article. The directory after the pages of terms of service lists committees of the Senate, House (Standing with Subcommittees, Select and Special) and Joint and, after that, House/Senate committee assignments. On the committees section of the House and Senate in the Official Congressional Directory, the committee's members on the first row on the left side shows the chairman of the committee and on the right side shows the ranking member of the committee.

=== Senate ===
- Aeronautical and Space Sciences (Chair: Clinton P. Anderson; Ranking Member: Margaret Chase Smith)
- Agriculture and Forestry (Chair: Allen J. Ellender; Ranking Member: George D. Aiken)
- Appropriations (Chair: Richard B. Russell; Ranking Member: Milton R. Young)
- Armed Services (Chair: John C. Stennis; Ranking Member: Margaret Chase Smith)
- Banking and Currency (Chair: John J. Sparkman; Ranking Member: Wallace F. Bennett)
- Commerce (Chair: Warren G. Magnuson; Ranking Member: Norris Cotton)
- District of Columbia (Chair: Joseph D. Tydings; Ranking Member: Winston L. Prouty)
- Equal Educational Opportunity (Select) (Chair: [data missing]; Ranking Member: [data missing])
- Finance (Chair: Russell B. Long; Ranking Member: John J. Williams)
- Foreign Relations (Chair: J. William Fulbright; Ranking Member: George D. Aiken)
- Government Operations (Chair: John Little McClellan; Ranking Member: Karl E. Mundt)
- Interior and Insular Affairs (Chair: Henry M. Jackson; Ranking Member: Gordon Allott)
- Judiciary (Chair: James O. Eastland; Ranking Member: Everett M. Dirksen, then Roman Hruska)
- Labor and Public Welfare (Chair: Ralph W. Yarborough; Ranking Member: Jacob K. Javits)
- Nutrition and Human Needs (Select) (Chair: George S. McGovern)
- Post Office and Civil Service (Chair: Gale W. McGee; Ranking Member: Hiram Fong)
- Public Works (Chair: Jennings Randolph; Ranking Member: John Sherman Cooper)
- Rules and Administration (Chair: B. Everett Jordan; Ranking Member: Carl T. Curtis)
- Small Business (Select) (Chair: Alan Bible)
- Standards and Conduct (Select) (Chair: John C. Stennis; Vice Chairman: Wallace F. Bennett)
- Whole

=== House of Representatives ===
- Agriculture (Chair: William R. Poage; Ranking Member: Page Belcher)
- Appropriations (Chair: George H. Mahon; Ranking Member: Frank T. Bow)
- Armed Services (Chair: L. Mendel Rivers; Ranking Member: William H. Bates)
- Banking and Currency (Chair: Wright Patman; Ranking Member: William B. Widnall)
- District of Columbia (Chair: John L. McMillan; Ranking Member: Ancher Nelsen)
- Education and Labor (Chair: Carl D. Perkins; Ranking Member: William H. Ayres)
- Foreign Affairs (Chair: Thomas E. Morgan; Ranking Member: E. Ross Adair)
- Government Operations (Chair: William L. Dawson; Ranking Member: Florence P. Dwyer)
- House Administration (Chair: Samuel N. Friedel; Ranking Member: Glenard P. Lipscomb)
- House Beauty Shop (Select) (Chair: Martha W. Griffiths)
- House Restaurant (Select) (Chairman: N/A; Ranking Member: N/A)
- Interior and Insular Affairs (Chair: Wayne N. Aspinall; Ranking Member: John P. Saylor)
- Internal Security (Chair: Richard H. Ichord; Ranking Member: John M. Ashbrook)
- Interstate and Foreign Commerce (Chair: Harley O. Staggers; Ranking Member: William L. Springer)
- Judiciary (Chair: Emanuel Celler; Ranking Member: William M. McCulloch)
- Merchant Marine and Fisheries (Chair: Edward A. Garmatz; Ranking Member: William S. Mailliard)
- Parking (Select) (Chair: Bernice F. Sisk)
- Post Office and Civil Service (Chair: Thaddeus J. Dulski; Ranking Member: Robert J. Corbett)
- Public Works (Chair: George Hyde Fallon; Ranking Member: William C. Cramer)
- Rules (Chair: William M. Colmer; Ranking Member: H. Allen Smith)
- Science and Astronautics (Chair: George P. Miller; Ranking Member: James G. Fulton)
- Small Business (Select) (Chair: Joe L. Evins)
- Standards of Official Conduct (Chair: Charles Melvin Price; Ranking Member: Leslie C. Arends)
- Veterans' Affairs (Chair: Olin E. Teague; Ranking Member: Charles M. Teague)
- Ways and Means (Chair: Wilbur D. Mills; Ranking Member: John W. Byrnes)
- Whole

=== Joint committees ===
- Atomic Energy (Chair: Rep. Chet Holifield; Vice Chair: Sen. John O. Pastore)
- Congressional Operations
- Defense Productions (Chair: Sen. John J. Sparkman; Vice Chair: Rep. Wright Patman)
- Disposition of Executive Papers
- Economic (Chair: Rep. Wright Patman; Vice Chair: Sen. William Proxmire)
- Immigration and Nationality Policy
- Legislative Budget (Chair: Rep. Wilbur D. Mills)
- The Library (Chair: Rep. Samuel N. Friedel; Vice Chair: Sen. B. Everett Jordan)
- Navajo-Hopi Indian Administration
- Printing (Chair: Sen. B. Everett Jordan; Vice Chair: Rep. Samuel N. Friedel)
- Reduction of Nonessential Federal Expenditures (Chair: Rep. George H. Mahon)
- Taxation (Chair: Rep. Wilbur D. Mills; Vice Chair: Sen. Russell B. Long)

== Employees ==
Legislative branch agency directors

- Architect of the Capitol: J. George Stewart, appointed October 1, 1954, died May 24, 1970
- Attending Physician of the United States Congress: Rufus Pearson
- Comptroller General of the United States: Elmer B. Staats
- Librarian of Congress: Lawrence Quincy Mumford
- Public Printer of the United States: James L. Harrison, until 1970
  - Adolphus N. Spence, from 1970

Senate

- Secretary: Francis R. Valeo
- Librarian: Richard D. Hupman
- Curator: Richard A. Baker (acting), until 1970
  - James R. Ketchum, from 1970
- Parliamentarian: Floyd Riddick
- Sergeant at Arms: Robert G. Dunphy
- Chaplain: Frederick Brown Harris (Methodist), until January 9, 1969
  - Edward L. R. Elson (Presbyterian), from January 9, 1969
- Democratic Party Secretary: J. Stanley Kimmitt
- Republican Party Secretary: J. Mark Trice

House of Representatives

- Clerk: W. Pat Jennings
- Sergeant at Arms: Zeake W. Johnson Jr.
- Doorkeeper: William M. Miller
- Postmaster: H. H. Morris
- Parliamentarian: Lewis Deschler
- Reading Clerks: Charles W. Hackney Jr. (D) and Joe Bartlett (R)
- Chaplain: Edward G. Latch (Methodist)

== See also ==
- List of new members of the 91st United States Congress
- 1968 United States elections (elections leading to this Congress)
  - 1968 United States presidential election
  - 1968 United States Senate elections
  - 1968 United States House of Representatives elections
- 1970 United States elections (elections during this Congress, leading to the next Congress)
  - 1970 United States Senate elections
  - 1970 United States House of Representatives elections
