= 1942 Pennsylvania gubernatorial election =

- November 3, 1942
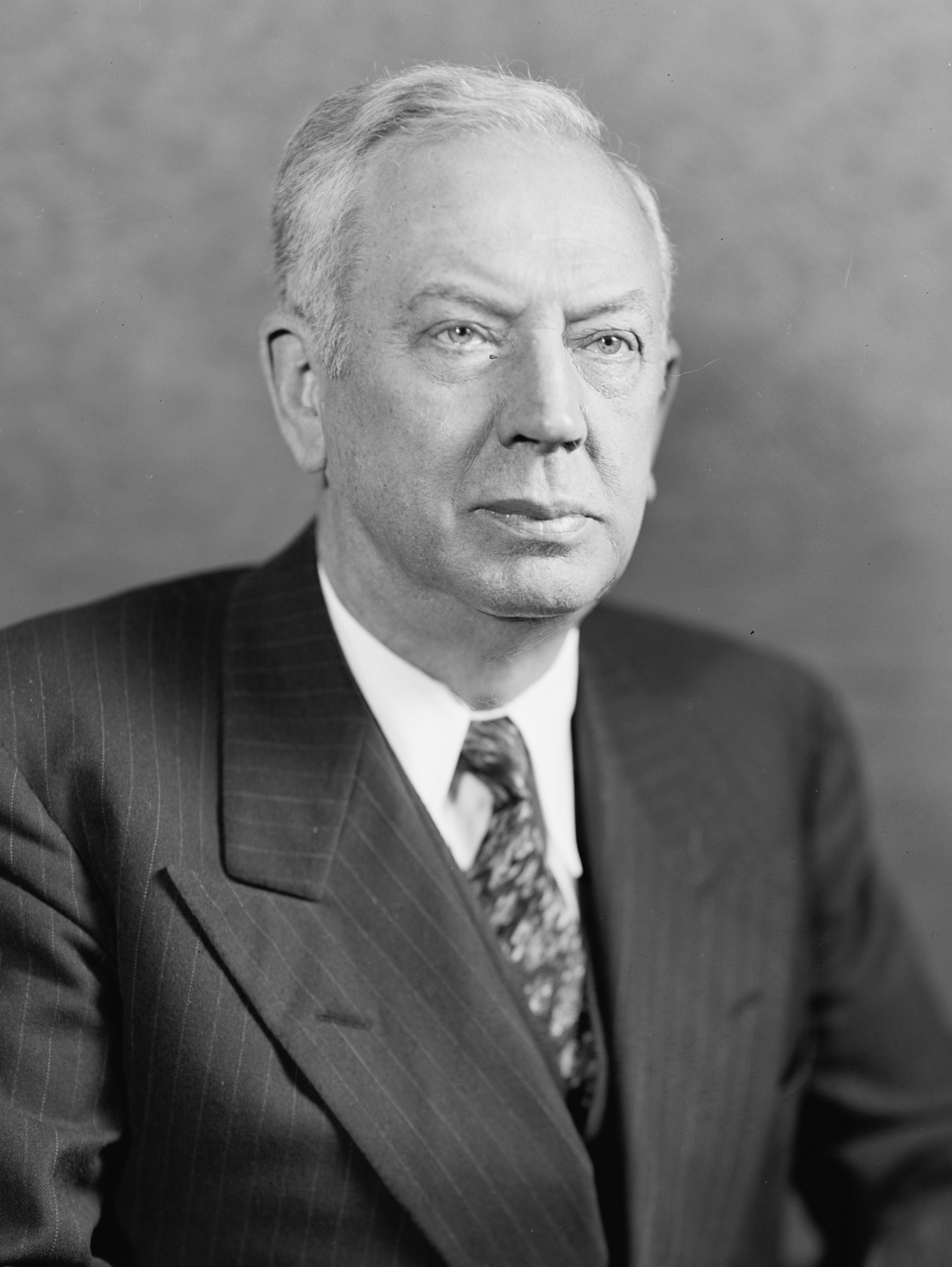

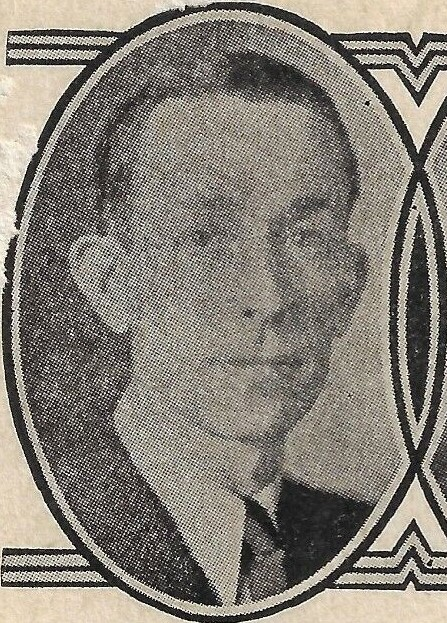
Nominee	Edward Martin	F. Clair Ross
Party	Republican	Democratic
Popular vote	1,367,531	1,149,897
Percentage	53.67%	45.13%
- County results Martin: 40–50% 50–60% 60–70% 70–80% Ross: 40–50% 50–60%
Governor before election
Arthur James
Republican
Elected Governor
Edward Martin
Republican

The 1942 Pennsylvania gubernatorial election occurred on November 3, 1942. Incumbent Republican governor Arthur James was not a candidate for re-election. Republican candidate Edward Martin defeated Democratic candidate F. Clair Ross to become Governor of Pennsylvania.

== Democratic primary ==
=== Candidates ===
- Clarence P. Bowers, businessman from Reading, Pennsylvania
- Luther Harr, U.S. Bituminous Coal Consumers' Counsel counsel
- James J. Regan Jr., attorney from Bala Cynwyd, Pennsylvania
- F. Clair Ross, Pennsylvania Auditor General and former State Treasurer
- Ralph H. Smith, Allegheny County Court of Common Pleas judge

=== Results ===
Democratic primary results Ross: 30%–40%; 40%–50%; 50%–60%; 60%–70%; 70%–80%; 80%–90%; 90%–100%; Smith: 40%–50%; 50%–60%; Harr: 30%–40%

Pennsylvania gubernatorial Democratic primary election, 1942
Party	Candidate	Votes	%
Democratic	F. Clair Ross	277,004	49.43
Democratic	Ralph H. Smith	216,225	38.58
Democratic	Luther Harr	46,849	8.36
Democratic	James J. Regan, Jr.	12,195	2.18
Democratic	Clarence P. Bowers	8,126	1.45
Total votes		560,399	100.00

== Republican primary ==
=== Candidates ===
- James J. Davis, incumbent U.S. Senator from Pennsylvania (1930–1945)
- Edward Martin, former Pennsylvania Treasurer and Auditor General

=== Results ===
Republican primary results Martin: 50%–60%; 60%–70%; 70%–80%; 80%–90%; Davis: 50%–60%; 60%–70%

Pennsylvania gubernatorial Republican primary election, 1942
Party	Candidate	Votes	%
Republican	Edward Martin	517,915	55.17
Republican	James J. Davis	420,815	44.83
Total votes		938,730	100.00

== Results ==
Pennsylvania gubernatorial election, 1942
Party	Candidate	Votes	%
Republican	Edward Martin	1,367,531	53.67
Democratic	F. Clair Ross	1,149,897	45.13
Prohibition	Dale H. Learn	17,385	0.68
United Pension	John J. Haluska	7,911	0.31
Socialist Labor	Joseph Pirincin	5,310	0.21
N/A	Others	37	0.00
Totals		2,548,071	100.00%
