= Weldon Heyburn (disambiguation) =

Weldon Heyburn was an American actor.

Other people with the name include:

- Weldon B. Heyburn (1852–1912), American politician and attorney
- Weldon Brinton Heyburn (Pennsylvania politician) (1903–1979), American politician
