= Robert F. Kent =

American politician, state representative, and Pennsylvania Treasurer (1911–1982)

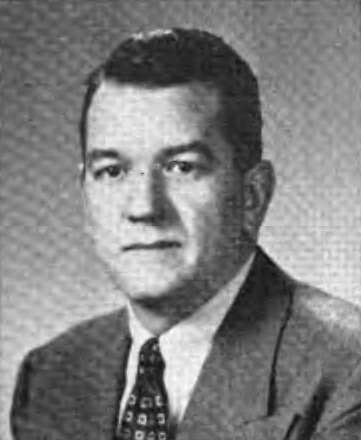

65th Treasurer of Pennsylvania
- In office 1957–1961
- Governor: George M. Leader; David L. Lawrence
- Preceded by: Weldon Brinton Heyburn
- Succeeded by: Grace M. Sloan

Member of the Pennsylvania House of Representatives
- In office 1947–1956

Personal details
- Born: Robert Free Kent; June 26, 1911 Meadville, Pennsylvania, U.S.
- Died: October 1, 1982 (aged 71) Harrisburg, Pennsylvania, U.S.
- Education: Allegheny College (AB), University of Pennsylvania Law School (LLB)
- Occupation: Lawyer, politician

Robert Free Kent (June 26, 1911 – October 1, 1982) was an American lawyer and politician who represented Crawford County in the Pennsylvania House of Representatives from 1947 to 1956 and served as Pennsylvania Treasurer from 1957 to 1961. Kent served in the US Marine Corps during World War II and postwar became a captain in the Marine Corps Reserve. A Republican, he ran for Pennsylvania Auditor General in 1960, losing to Democratic nominee Thomas Z. Minehart.

== Early life ==
Kent was born in Meadville, Pennsylvania, to parents O. Clare and Marion L. (Irving) Kent. He attended local public schools and earned his BA from Allegheny College and his LLB from the University of Pennsylvania Law School. Following admittance to the bar, he went into practice with his father in the firm Kent & Kent. He interrupted his practice to serve as a first lieutenant in the Marine Corps Reserves in 1944–46 during World War II, serving onboard the USS Menard (1945) and USS Roi (1946) and deploying overseas to Hawaii, Okinawa, and China. Postwar, he served as a captain in the Marine Corps Reserve.

== Political career ==
On returning home from deployment, Kent was elected as a Republican to the Pennsylvania House of Representatives for the 1947 term and reelected for four consecutive terms thereafter, serving through the end of 1956. In the House, he chaired the Joint Legislative Committee on Tax-Exempt Real Property (1947–48) and served on the Commission on Interstate Cooperation (1953–54) and the Joint State Government Commission (1955–56). He served as Majority Whip in 1953. He was a member of the Republican Executive Committee of Crawford County and chaired the Crawford County Republican Party in 1953.

Rather than seeking reelection to the House in 1956, Kent ran for Pennsylvania State Treasurer and won the election with 52% of the vote, defeating Democratic nominee James W. Knox. In 1960, nearing the end of his four-year term as treasurer, he ran for Pennsylvania Auditor General, winning 48% of the vote but losing to Democratic nominee Thomas Z. Minehart. He subsequently served on the State Employees Retirement Board and the State Public School Building Authority.

== Personal life ==
Kent was married to Martha (Fell) Kent and had two children. He died at his suburban home in Harrisburg on October 1, 1982, at the age of 71. He was interred at Indiantown Gap National Cemetery.

Party political offices
Preceded by Weldon Brinton Heyburn	Republican nominee for Treasurer of Pennsylvania; 1956	Succeeded by Charles C. Smith
Preceded by Charles C. Smith	Republican nominee for Auditor General of Pennsylvania; 1960	Succeeded by W. Stuart Helm
