= Charles C. Smith (Pennsylvania politician) =

American politician

40th Auditor General of Pennsylvania
- In office 1957–1961
- Governor: George M. Leader; David L. Lawrence
- Preceded by: Charles R. Barber
- Succeeded by: Thomas Minehart

75th Speaker of the Pennsylvania House of Representatives
- In office January 6, 1953 – January 3, 1955
- Preceded by: Herbert Sorg
- Succeeded by: Hiram Andrews

Republican Leader of the Pennsylvania House of Representatives
- In office January 3, 1955 – November 30, 1956
- Preceded by: Albert Johnson
- Succeeded by: Albert Johnson
- In office January 2, 1951 – November 30, 1952
- Preceded by: Charles Brunner
- Succeeded by: Albert Johnson

Member of the Pennsylvania House of Representatives from the Philadelphia County district
- In office January 2, 1945 – November 30, 1956

Personal details
- Born: October 8, 1908
- Died: December 22, 1970 (aged 62)
- Party: Republican

Charles C. Smith (October 8, 1908 – December 22, 1970) was a Speaker of the Pennsylvania House of Representatives.

Smith was elected to the Pennsylvania House of Representatives in 1944 and served through 1956.

Smith was sworn in on October 4, 1943, to serve the remainder of the 1943 term, and reelected to the House to six consecutive terms thereafter.

He was from Philadelphia, Pennsylvania.

== Biography ==
Charles is a representative from Philadelphia County, and was born, October 8, in 1908. He graduated from Northeast High School in 1927, and after college he became a partner in a fuel business firm Smith and Boyd.

Political offices
Preceded by Charles Barber	Auditor General of Pennsylvania; 1957–1961	Succeeded by Thomas Minehart
Preceded by Herbert Sorg	Speaker of the Pennsylvania House of Representatives; 1953–1954	Succeeded by Hiram Andrews
Party political offices
Preceded by Charles Barber	Republican nominee for Auditor General of Pennsylvania; 1956 (won)	Succeeded by Robert Kent
Preceded by Robert F. Kent	Republican nominee for Treasurer of Pennsylvania; 1960	Succeeded by Robert D. Fleming
Preceded by Albert Johnson	Republican Leader of the Pennsylvania House of Representatives; 1955–1956	Succeeded by Albert Johnson
Preceded by Charles Brunner	Republican Leader of the Pennsylvania House of Representatives; 1951–1952	Succeeded by Albert Johnson
