= Charles R. Barber =

American politician; Pennsylvania Treasurer and Auditor General (1901–1987)

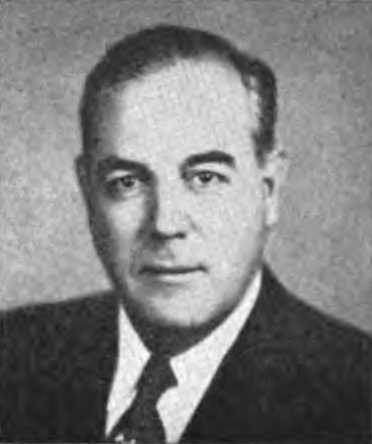

39th Auditor General of Pennsylvania
- In office 1953–1957
- Governor: John S. Fine; George M. Leader
- Preceded by: Weldon Brinton Heyburn
- Succeeded by: Charles C. Smith

63rd Treasurer of Pennsylvania
- In office 1949–1953
- Governor: James H. Duff; John S. Fine
- Preceded by: Ramsey S. Black
- Succeeded by: Weldon Brinton Heyburn

37th Mayor of Erie, Pennsylvania
- In office 1936–1947
- Preceded by: James Patrick Rossiter
- Succeeded by: Gale H. Ross

Personal details
- Born: Charles Raycroft Barber; April 19, 1901 Erie, Pennsylvania, US
- Died: February 7, 1987 (aged 85) Erie, Pennsylvania
- Party: Republican
- Occupation: Politician

Charles Raycroft Barber (April 19, 1901 – February 7, 1987) was an American politician who served as Pennsylvania Treasurer from 1949 to 1953 and Pennsylvania Auditor General from 1953 to 1957. A member of the Republican Party, Barber also served twelve years as mayor of Erie, Pennsylvania, as well as a city alderman and state secretary of welfare.

== Early life and education ==
Barber was born in Erie, the oldest of ten children of John J. and Catherine (Cantwell) Barber. His father, a grocer, served on the city council from 1905 to 1909. Growing up in a working-class neighborhood on Erie's lower east side, he attended local public schools and graduated from Erie High School. After his father's unexpected death, he worked as a steelworker.

== Career ==
First elected alderman of the first ward in Erie at the age of 27, Barber served two terms on the Erie city council and became the city mayor in 1936, serving three terms in office. He resigned during the last year of his third term to become Secretary of Welfare under Governor James H. Duff in February 1947. He was elected State Treasurer in 1948 and assumed office on May 2, 1949. He was elected Pennsylvania Auditor General in November 1952 and assumed office on May 5, 1953. He served on the Delaware River Joint Toll Bridge Commission, the General State Authority, the Delaware River Port Authority, and the Pennsylvania Teachers Retirement Board and participated in more than twenty civic and fraternal organizations.

Groomed as a GOP candidate for governor during the 1950s, Barber's political career ended when he underwent major surgery and left public service. He then worked for a decade as a consultant to an engineering firm in Harrisburg before retiring.

== Personal life ==
A Roman Catholic of Irish-American heritage, Barber was married to Pauline Squires. The couple had no children.

Barber died at the Saint Vincent Health Center in Erie at the age of 86 and was buried at Erie's Calvary Cemetery.

Party political offices
Preceded by Edgar W. Baird, Jr.	Republican nominee for Treasurer of Pennsylvania; 1948	Succeeded by Weldon Brinton Heyburn
Preceded by Weldon Brinton Heyburn	Republican nominee for Auditor General of Pennsylvania; 1952	Succeeded by Charles C. Smith
