= Drifton, Pennsylvania =

Unincorporated community in Pennsylvania, US

- Unincorporated community
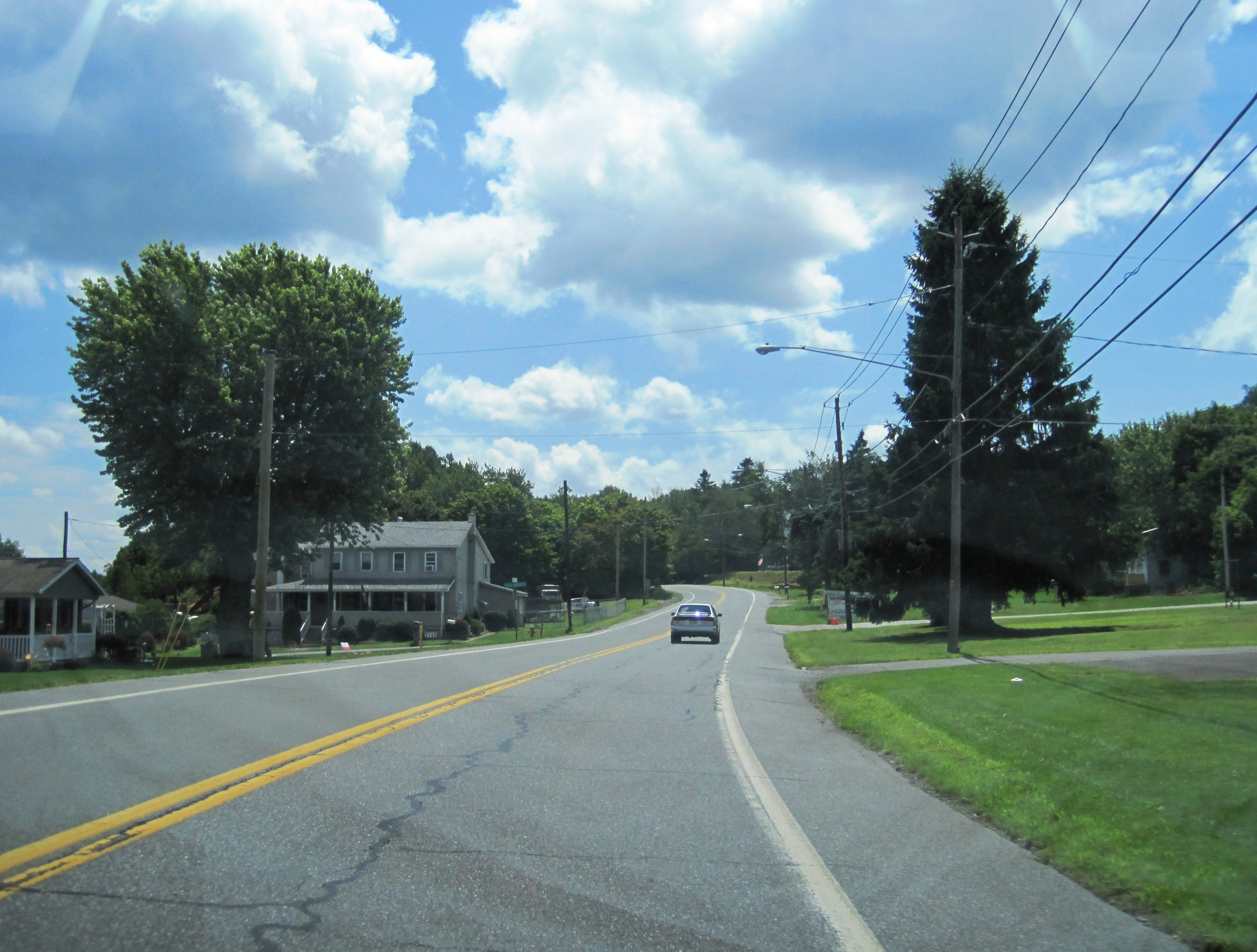
- Drifton along PA 940 in July 2023

- Location within Pennsylvania Location within the United States
- Coordinates: 40°59′59″N 75°54′20″W
- Country: United States
- State: Pennsylvania
- County: Luzerne
- Township: Hazle
- Elevation: 1,667 ft (508 m)
- Time zone: UTC-5 (Eastern (EST))
  - Summer (DST): UTC-4 (EDT)
- ZIP Code: 18221
- Area codes: 570 and 272
- GNIS feature ID: 1173480

Drifton is an unincorporated community located in Hazle Township in Luzerne County, Pennsylvania. Drifton is located along Pennsylvania Route 940, northwest of Jeddo and southwest of Freeland.

== Notable person ==
- G. Harold Wagner, former Pennsylvania state treasurer and auditor general
