= Frank E. Baldwin =

American politician (1866–1943)

Frank Elmer Baldwin

33rd Auditor General of Pennsylvania
- In office 1933–1937
- Governor: Gifford Pinchot; George Howard Earle III
- Preceded by: Charles A. Waters
- Succeeded by: Warren R. Roberts

Member of the Pennsylvania State Senate from the 25th district
- In office 1917–1932

Personal details
- Born: June 4, 1866 Otto Township, Pennsylvania
- Died: August 4, 1943 (aged 77) Austin, Pennsylvania
- Party: Republican
- Education: St. Bonaventure University, University of Michigan

Frank Elmer Baldwin (June 4, 1866 – August 4, 1943) was an American politician who represented the 25th district of the Pennsylvania State Senate (1909–1912, 1917–1932) and served as Pennsylvania Auditor General (1933–1937). He was a member of the Republican Party from Potter County, Pennsylvania.

== Life and career ==
Baldwin was born on June 4, 1866, in Duke Center, Otto Township, McKean County, Pennsylvania. His parents were John and Josephine White Baldwin. He attended the Chamberlain Institute in Randolph, New York, and graduated from Saint Bonaventure College in Allegany, New York. He then taught school for three years before completing his education at the University of Michigan Law School in 1893 and entering private law practice in Austin, Pennsylvania, the following year. In ensuing years he acquired interests in real estate, banking, and oil and served as president of the Bank of Austin. He entered local politics, serving two terms as burgess of Austin, seven years as postmaster of Potter County, and five years as school director.

Baldwin chaired the Potter County Republican Party in 1902. He was elected to the Pennsylvania State Senate in 1909 and won reelection in 1911, representing the 25th Senate district comprising McKean, Potter and Tioga counties. He returned to office in 1917 and served eight consecutive terms until 1932. As senator, he served on the committees for Appropriations, Banks and Building and Loan Associations, Corporations, Executive Nominations, Exposition Affairs, Forestry, Game and Fisheries, Insurance, Judiciary Special, Mines and Mining, Municipal Affairs, Public Roads and Highways. He also chaired the Judiciary General, Finance, and Corporations committees and served as Senate president pro tempore in 1920. He concluded his political career by serving one term as Pennsylvania Auditor General from 1933 to 1937, when he retired from office as Pennsylvania's only Republican statewide elected official.

== Personal life ==
Baldwin married Addie G. Wolters Baldwin in 1895. The couple had one daughter, Emma Baldwin. Baldwin lost his parents and his sister, Grace, in the Austin Dam failure of 1911. He died on August 4, 1943, in Austin, Pennsylvania, at the age of 77. Interment took place at Forest Hill Cemetery in town.
