= G. Harold Wagner =

American politician (1900–1960)

61st Treasurer of Pennsylvania
- In office May 5, 1941 – May 1, 1945
- Governor: Arthur James; Edward Martin
- Preceded by: F. Clair Ross
- Succeeded by: Ramsey S. Black

37th Auditor General of Pennsylvania
- In office 1945–1949
- Governor: Edward Martin; John C. Bell Jr.
- Preceded by: Ted A. Rosenberg
- Succeeded by: Weldon Brinton Heyburn

Personal details
- Born: July 19, 1900 Drifton, Pennsylvania, U.S.
- Died: April 20, 1960 (aged 59) Asheville, North Carolina, U.S.
- Party: Democratic
- Education: Mining and Mechanical Institute of Freeland, Wilkes-Barre Business School

G. Harold Wagner (July 19, 1900 – April 20, 1960) was an American politician from Pennsylvania who served as Pennsylvania State Treasurer and Pennsylvania State Auditor General.

== Early life and education ==
Wagner was born in Drifton, Pennsylvania to George and Sallie (Kitchen) Wagner. He attended the Mining and Mechanical Institute of Freeland, and graduated from Wilkes-Barre Business School.

During World War I, Wagner enlisted in the U.S. Navy, and served at the U.S. Naval Mine Depot in Yorktown, Virginia.

== Career ==
Prior to entering politics, Wagner held clerical positions with two local railroads, and worked as editor and business manager for the Dallas Post newspaper in Dallas, Pennsylvania.

He served as Treasurer of Dallas, Pennsylvania, and as Deputy Clerk of Courts of Luzerne County; and he later headed the inheritance tax department of Luzerne County before his appointment as the county's property assessor in 1930.

Originally a Republican, Wagner switched to the Democratic Party in 1934, before seeking statewide office.

He served as Pennsylvania State Treasurer from 1941 to 1945 and as Pennsylvania State Auditor General from 1945 to 1949. In 1952, he unsuccessfully sought the Democratic nomination to the United States Senate to Guy K. Bard.

== Personal life ==
Wagner was married to Madeline (Stroh) Wagner, with whom he had five children; to Carolyn (Bonomo) Wagner; and to Dorothy M. (Singer) Wagner, his wife at the time of his death.

After retirement from public life, Wagner moved to Florida where he was involved in real estate development in Ft. Lauderdale and Pompano Beach. He later moved to Black Mountain, North Carolina where he subdivided property and built homes until his death.

In 1960, Wagner suffered a heart attack and died at an Asheville, North Carolina hospital near Black Mountain.

Party political offices
Preceded by F. Clair Ross	Democratic nominee for Treasurer of Pennsylvania; 1940	Succeeded by Ramsey S. Black
Preceded by F. Clair Ross	Democratic nominee for Pennsylvania Auditor General; 1944	Succeeded by Ramsey S. Black
Political offices
Preceded by F. Clair Ross	Treasurer of Pennsylvania; 1941–1945	Succeeded by Ramsey S. Black
Legal offices
Preceded by Ted A. Rosenberg	Pennsylvania Auditor General; 1945–1949	Succeeded by Weldon Brinton Heyburn
