= Levi G. McCauley =

American politician (1837–1920)

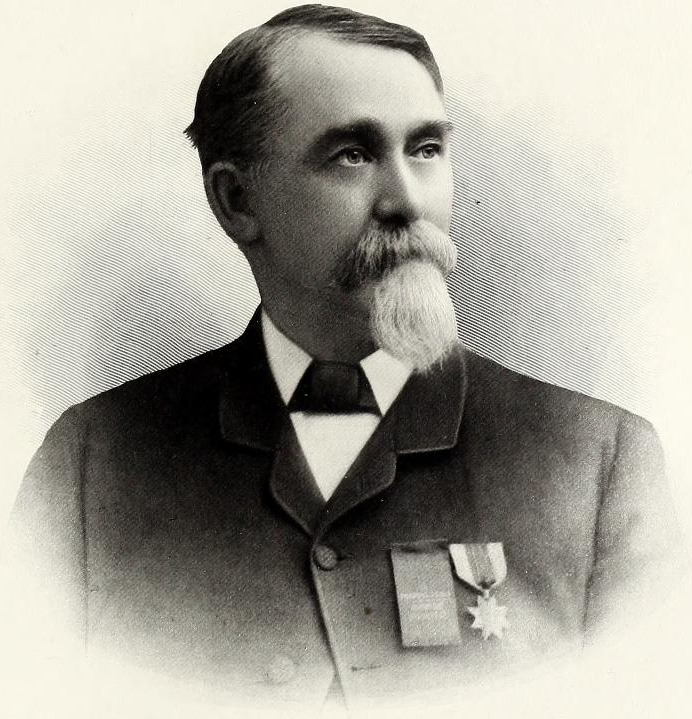
- McCauley in a 1898 publication

23rd Auditor General of Pennsylvania
- In office 1897–1901
- Preceded by: Amos H. Mylin
- Succeeded by: Edmund B. Hardenbergh

Personal details
- Born: Levi Gheen McCauley; September 2, 1837 near Whitford, Pennsylvania, U.S.
- Died: August 7, 1920 (aged 82) West Chester, Pennsylvania, U.S.
- Party: Republican
- Spouse: Isabella Darlington (m. 1870)
- Occupation: Politician; engineer
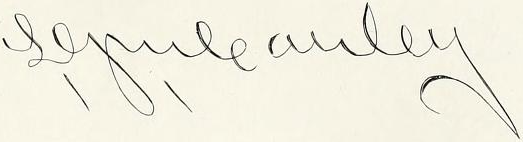
- Signature
- Military career
- Allegiance: United States
- Branch: Union Army
- Service years: 1861–1866
- Rank: Brevet Major
- Units: 7th Pennsylvania Reserve Regiment; 1st Army Corps; 5th Army Corps; 22nd Army Corps
- Conflicts: American Civil War; Battle of Charles City Cross Roads (WIA) (POW)

Levi Gheen McCauley (September 2, 1837 – August 7, 1920) was an American politician from Pennsylvania. He served as Pennsylvania Auditor General from 1897 to 1901.

== Early life ==
Levi Gheen McCauley was born on September 2, 1837, on a farm near Whitford, Pennsylvania, to Lydia G. and John McCauley. He was educated at public schools in Luzerne County. He then attended Abington Seminary, Berwick Academy and Wyoming Seminary.

== Career ==
After leaving school, McCauley worked as a mechanical engineer. He worked at New York and Erie Railroad. He was a machinist at Vulcan Iron Works in Wilkes-Barre. He then worked in iron mining in Montgomery, Alabama.

At the outbreak of the Civil War, McCauley returned to Pennsylvania. He enlisted under his father John McCauley in Susquehanna County. After his father was refused commission, he joined Company F of the 7th Pennsylvania Reserve Regiment from Wilkes-Barre in the spring of 1861. He joined as a private at Camp Wayne in Chester County. He was quickly promoted to first sergeant and then to first lieutenant of Company C of the 7th. He served with General George A. McCall's division and went on an expedition to Great Falls, Virginia, on September 4, 1861. He also participated on an expedition to Gunnell's Farm near Drainsville, Virginia, in October of that year. He was later assigned to Second Brigade, Second Division of the 1st Army Corps. He was assigned to the Third Division of the 5th Army Corps and then to the Third Division of the 1st Army Corps. He lost his right arm at the Battle of Charles City Cross Roads. He was carried from the battle by Daniel H. Hastings. He was captured at a hospital and imprisoned in Libby Prison. He was paroled on August 13, 1862, at City Point. In February 1863, he returned to his regiment and was assigned to the Second Division of the 22nd Army Corps. On July 20, 1863, he was promoted to captain. On November 25, 1863, he was transferred to the veteran reserve. He was brevetted major on November 7, 1865, for "meritorious service". He was mustered out of service on January 30, 1866, and was discharged on June 30, 1866.

McCauley was elected register of wills of Chester County in 1869. He served in that role for three years. He was chairman of the Republican County Executive Committee from 1886 to 1889. He was a delegate to the Republican state convention in 1886, 1890 and 1894. He was nominated for the role of Pennsylvania Auditor General on August 26, 1897. He was elected to that role in November 1897. He served in that role until 1901. Around 1910, he was elected clerk of the Pennsylvania House of Representatives.

McCauley was appointed trustee of the West Chester State Normal School in May 1891. He was appointed as member of the Valley Forge Commission in 1895. He was a member of the board of directors of the Pennsylvania Soldiers' Orphans' School. He was a director of Farmer's National Bank and worked as superintendent of the West Chester Gas Company.

== Personal life ==
McCauley married Isabella Darlington, daughter of William Darlington, on October 6, 1870. They had no children.

McCauley died on August 7, 1920, at his home in West Chester.
