= Grace M. Sloan =

American politician; Pennsylvania state treasurer and auditor general

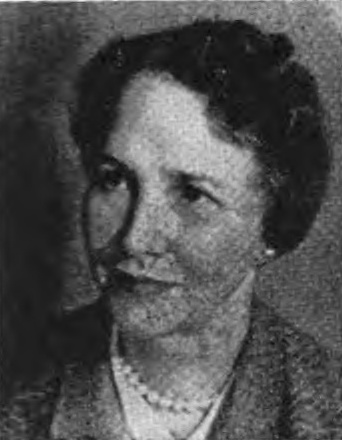

66th and 68th Treasurer of Pennsylvania
- In office 1961–1965
- Governor: David L. Lawrence; William Scranton
- Preceded by: Robert F. Kent
- Succeeded by: Thomas Z. Minehart
- In office 1969–1977
- Governor: Raymond P. Shafer; Milton Shapp
- Preceded by: Thomas Z. Minehart
- Succeeded by: Robert E. Casey

42nd Auditor General of Pennsylvania
- In office 1965–1969
- Governor: William Scranton; Raymond P. Shafer
- Preceded by: Thomas Z. Minehart
- Succeeded by: Bob Casey Sr.

Personal details
- Born: Grace McCalmont; July 2, 1902 Clarion, Pennsylvania, US
- Died: November 13, 2001 (aged 99) Sun City, Arizona, US
- Occupation: Politician

Grace McCalmont Sloan (July 12, 1902 – November 13, 2001) was an American politician who served as Pennsylvania State Treasurer (1961–1965 and again 1969–1977) and Pennsylvania Auditor General (1965–1969). A Democrat from Clarion, Pennsylvania, Sloan was the first woman to serve in either state office and only the second woman to serve in any statewide elected office (the first was Genevieve Blatt, elected to the since-repealed position of Secretary of Internal Affairs in 1954).

Sloan began her career as a civic leader in Clarion. She ran for Congress on the Democratic ticket but lost the 1956 general election. She went on to win three four-year terms as state treasurer and one four-year term as auditor general. She is the longest-serving treasurer in Pennsylvania's history. Her husband, John Sloan, was a county sheriff and US Marshal.

Party political offices
Preceded by James W. Knox	Democratic nominee for Treasurer of Pennsylvania; 1960	Succeeded by Thomas Z. Minehart
Preceded by Thomas Z. Minehart	Democratic nominee for Pennsylvania Auditor General; 1964	Succeeded by Bob Casey Sr.
Preceded by Thomas Z. Minehart	Democratic nominee for Treasurer of Pennsylvania; 1968, 1972	Succeeded by Robert E. Casey
