= Housing and Urban Development Act of 1970 =

- Long title: An Act to provide for the establishment of a national urban growth policy, to encourage and support the proper growth and development of our States, metropolitan areas, cities, and communities, and for other purposes.
- Enacted by: the 91st United States Congress

Citations
- Public law: Pub. L. 91-609
- Statutes at Large: 84 Stat. 1770

Legislative history
- Introduced in the House as H.R. 19436 by Wright Patman on September 29, 1970; Signed into law by President Richard Nixon on December 31, 1970

Title VII, otherwise known as the Housing and Urban Development Act of 1970 or New Communities Assistance Program was established to guarantee bonds, debentures, and other financing of private and public new community developers and to provide other development assistance through interest loans and grants, public service grants, and planning assistance.

In raising the ceiling on guarantees for new communities to $500 million, Title VII made truly largescale projects feasible. The program included a number of other provisions that supported planning for urban development and funded new public services. Importantly, the law "significantly expanded the concept of urban renewal to permit acquisition of land which was not blighted, including low utility land, inappropriately used land, [and] marginal land . . . for renewal purposes. This was done primarily to encourage and enable cities to undertake large-scale urban redevelopment projects, in effect, new-towns-in-town."

As a 1973 Urban Land Institute study noted: "A Title VII commitment bestows almost instant credibility on the developer in the financial community, since it legally allies the federal government with the developer. It also reassures the local governments and communities affected of the developer's real obligation to meet the planning, development, and environmental standards contained in federal law."

== See also ==
- United States Department of Housing and Urban Development
