= Thomas Z. Minehart =

American politician

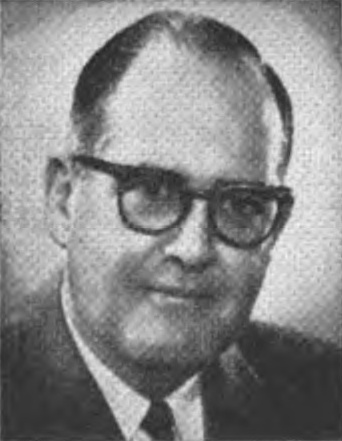

Chair of the Pennsylvania Democratic Party
- In office June 21, 1966 – June 23, 1970
- Preceded by: John S. Rice
- Succeeded by: John N. Scales

67th Treasurer of Pennsylvania
- In office January 18, 1965 – January 29, 1969
- Governor: William Scranton; Ray Shafer
- Preceded by: Grace M. Sloan
- Succeeded by: Grace M. Sloan

41st Auditor General of Pennsylvania
- In office January 23, 1961 – January 18, 1965
- Governor: David L. Lawrence; William Scranton
- Preceded by: Charles C. Smith
- Succeeded by: Grace M. Sloan

Member of the Philadelphia City Council for the 6th Council District
- In office January 1, 1936 – January 1, 1940
- Preceded by: Samuel Emlen
- Succeeded by: John K. McDevitt

Personal details
- Born: May 23, 1907
- Died: July 29, 1989 (aged 82) Reading, Pennsylvania, U.S.
- Political party: Democratic
- Spouse: Janet Mulvaney
- Children: 5
- Education: Temple University (BA); Temple University Beasley School of Law

Thomas Zeno Minehart (May 23, 1907 – July 29, 1989) was an American lawyer and politician from the state of Pennsylvania. He was a member of the Philadelphia City Council, chaired the Pennsylvania Democratic Party, and served as Pennsylvania Auditor General and Pennsylvania Treasurer during the 1960s.

== Early life and education ==
Minehart was born on May 23, 1907, to John Minehart and Elizabeth Cosgrove Minehart. He graduated from Temple University and Temple University School of Law. His father had served as a member of the Philadelphia City Council and his uncle, Thomas Z. Minehart, served as a member of the Pennsylvania House of Representatives from 1907 to 1908.

== Political career ==
In 1936, Minehart was elected to the Philadelphia City Council for the 6th district. Following the reorganization of the City Council in the 1919 city charter, Minehart was the only Democrat on the city council throughout his one term at City Hall. In 1942, he ran for the United States House of Representatives against Hugh Scott, but was defeated taking only 44% of the vote. After his defeat, he took a job as an attorney in the US Office of Price Administration. Minehart later moved to Fort Washington in Montgomery County and continued his law practice after leaving government.

In 1960, Minehart defeated Robert F. Kent, a state representative from Crawford County, in a race for Pennsylvania Auditor General. As auditor, Minehart initiated audits of the suburban counties of Philadelphia and later clashed with Governor William Scranton, a Republican, after the latter took office and fired thirty-two Democrats from state offices. He later declined to approve a purchase of draperies that the governor ordered for a reception.

In 1964, Minehart ran for Pennsylvania Treasurer against Robert D. Fleming, a member of the Pennsylvania State Senate from Pittsburgh. In light of the Democrats' landslide victory in the 1964 presidential election, Minehart had little trouble in dispatching his Republican opponent by 542,000 votes. He served a single four-year term as state treasurer.

In 1966, Minehart supported Bob Casey Sr. in the Democratic primary in the 1966 Pennsylvania gubernatorial election. Casey lost the nomination to Milton Shapp, but Minehart defeated Shapp's preferred candidate, Robert P. Kane, to become chair of the Pennsylvania Democratic Party. As chair, Minehart clashed with Democrats seeking reform of nomination rules after the party awarded Hubert Humphrey the majority of delegates even though Eugene McCarthy won the majority of votes in the 1968 presidential primary election. Minehart appointed a commission to reform the party's rules; however, the committee met only twice and had one public hearing before the committee was effectively shut down.

== Personal life ==
Minehart was married to Janet Mulvaney and fathered five children. The family resided in Fort Washington, Pennsylvania.

He died on July 29, 1989, in Reading, Pennsylvania, from heart failure.

Party political offices
| Preceded by Francis R. Smith | Democratic nominee for Pennsylvania Auditor General; 1960 | Succeeded by Grace M. Sloan |
| Preceded by Grace M. Sloan | Democratic nominee for Treasurer of Pennsylvania; 1964 | Succeeded by Grace M. Sloan |
Political offices
| Preceded by Grace M. Sloan | Treasurer of Pennsylvania; 1965–1969 | Succeeded by Grace M. Sloan |
| Preceded by Charles C. Smith | Auditor General of Pennsylvania; 1961–1965 | Succeeded by Grace M. Sloan |
