= F. Clair Ross =

American lawyer and politician

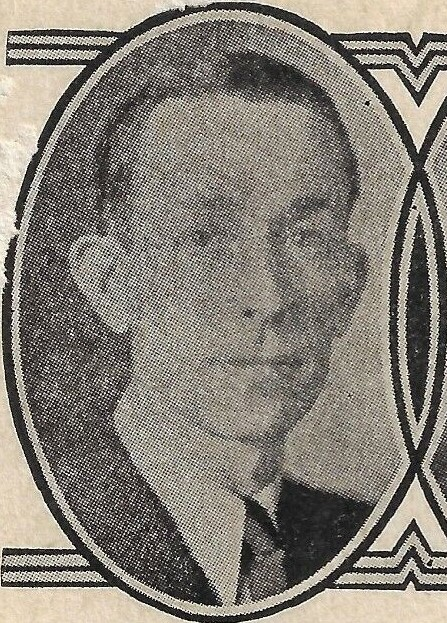
F. Clair Ross

Franklin Clair Ross (January 3, 1895 – January 17, 1956) was a Democratic Party politician and lawyer from Pennsylvania. He served as the 60th Treasurer of Pennsylvania from 1937 to 1941, as the 35th Pennsylvania Auditor General from 1941 to 1945, and on the Superior Court of Pennsylvania from 1945 until his death in 1956.

== Biography ==
The son of Clement V. and Maud McElwaine, Ross grew up in Sandy Lake, Mercer County, Pennsylvania. He graduated from Grove City College in 1914 and afterwards taught at Derry High School in Washington County. A veteran of World War I, he served with the United States Army Signal Corps as an aviator.

Ross graduated from Columbia Law School, studying under future U.S. Supreme Court Justice Harlan F. Stone, and was admitted to the Butler County Pennsylvania Bar in 1924. He served as an attorney at Brandon, Brandon, & Ross before entering political life. An active Democrat, Ross was appointed as deputy attorney general in the administration of Governor George Earle. In 1936, Ross was elected the 60th Pennsylvania Treasurer, and in 1940 he won a term as Pennsylvania Auditor General. After a protracted primary battle, Ross was nominated as the Democratic candidate for governor in 1942, but he was defeated by Edward Martin. In 1944, Ross won a seat on a seat on the Pennsylvania Superior Court, defeating former governor Arthur James. He suffered a heart attack in 1948 and died of a heart-related complications shortly after leaving a court session at the Philadelphia City Hall on January 17, 1956. He was survived by his wife, Carrie E. Bennett, and two daughters.

Political offices
Preceded by Charles A. Waters	Treasurer of Pennsylvania; 1937–1941	Succeeded by G. Harold Wagner
Legal offices
Preceded by Warren R. Roberts	Pennsylvania Auditor General; 1941–1944	Succeeded by Ted A. Rosenberg
Party political offices
Preceded by L.B. Shannon	Democratic nominee for Treasurer of Pennsylvania; 1936	Succeeded by G. Harold Wagner
Preceded by Charles Alvin Jones	Democratic nominee for Governor of Pennsylvania; 1942	Succeeded by John S. Rice
