= George Watkins (politician) =

American politician

George Robert Watkins
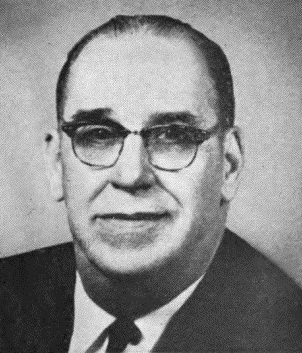

Member of the U.S. House of Representatives from Pennsylvania
- In office January 3, 1965 – August 7, 1970
- Preceded by: William H. Milliken, Jr.
- Succeeded by: John Ware
- Constituency: 7th district (1965–1967); 9th district (1967–1970)

Member of the Pennsylvania Senate from the 9th district
- In office January 4, 1949 – November 30, 1960
- Preceded by: Weldon Brinton Heyburn
- Succeeded by: Clarence Bell

Personal details
- Born: May 21, 1902 Hampton, Virginia, U.S.
- Died: August 7, 1970 (aged 68) West Chester, Pennsylvania, U.S.
- Party: Republican
- Spouse: Hilda Jane Smerback

George Robert Watkins (May 21, 1902 – August 7, 1970), also known as G. Robert Watkins, was an American politician from Pennsylvania. He served as a Republican member of the Pennsylvania Senate 9th district from 1949 to 1960, the United States House of Representatives from Pennsylvania's 7th congressional district from 1965 to 1967 and the United States House of Representatives from Pennsylvania's 9th congressional district from 1967 to 1970.

== Early life ==
George Watkins was born on May 21, 1902, in Hampton, Virginia. He learned the trade of shipfitter in Newport News, Virginia. In 1920, he moved to Chester, Pennsylvania, and organized the Chester Stevedoring Company, which he sold in 1931. In the 1920s, he was known to ship bootleg alcohol for the Delaware County Republican political boss, John J. McClure. In 1932, he and a partner founded the Blue Line Transfer Company and operated hundreds of trucks in the eastern United States. Watkins was president and board chairman of the Blue Line Transfer Company.

== Political career ==
In 1945, Watkins was elected Sheriff of Delaware County, Pennsylvania, and served one term through 1948.

In 1948, Watkins was elected to the Pennsylvania State Senate, 9th district, where he served from 1949 to 1960. He was succeeded by Clarence D. Bell.

Watkins served one term as county commissioner for Delaware County, from 1960 to 1964.

In 1964, Watkins was elected to the 89th United States Congress as a representative for Pennsylvania's 7th congressional district and served from 1965 to 1967.

Watkins was reelected to the 90th United States Congress and the 91st United States Congress.

Watkins served on the Committee on Interstate and Foreign Commerce during the 89th and 90th Congresses. He was appointed a member on Oct. 19, 1966, upon the resignation of vice Willard S. Curtin. At his death, he was succeeded on the committee on Sept. 23, 1970 by Republican John G. Schmitz of California.

== Redistricting controversy ==
On February 17, 1964, the U.S. Supreme Court rendered a long-awaited decision on congressional redistricting. By a six to three vote, the Court, in Wesberry v. Sanders that "as nearly as practicable, one man's vote in a congressional election it to be worth as much as another's." The effect of this ruling meant that the redistricting in Pennsylvania and many other states based on the 1960 census was nullified and would need to be redone.

In regard to his opposition to reapportionment and possible shift his home town of Birmingham and the rest of western Delaware County with Chester County Watkins commented, "It just doesn't seem right to me that a portion of Delaware County should be tacked onto some other county just to reach someone's idea of a magical figure." In January 1966, he testified to that effect before the state Senate reapportionment Committee and said that by 1970, Delaware County would have enough population to support two congressmen. In February, Watkins again attacked the pending redistricting plans:

If it is done now, large portions of Delaware County will be cut off from the balance of the county, attached to either Chester or Montgomery Counties and our people will be virtually without representation in Washington for at least the next four years. It will mean that Montgomery and Chester Counties will control those districts. It will mean that congressmen from those districts will not be working solely for Delaware County municipalities.

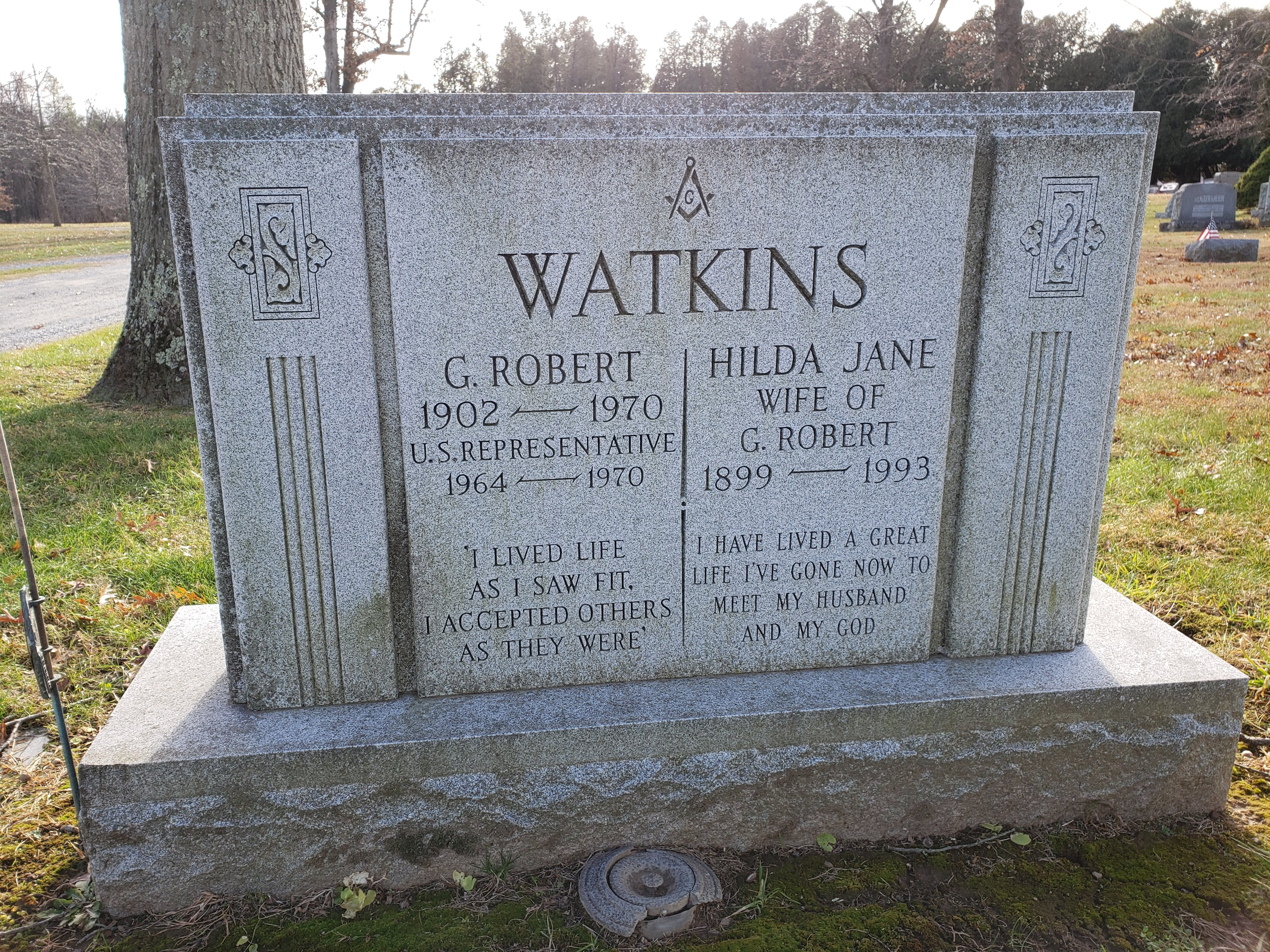
G. Robert Watkins grave in Birmingham-Lafayette Cemetery

With the shift of Watkins' hometown of Birmingham to the new Ninth District, the Seventh District became an open seat, which would be filled that year by Springfield Republican leader Lawrence G. Williams. In the meantime, Watkins now represented a district where 56% of the residents resided in Chester County. In spite of the desire of some leaders that the district be represented by a Chester County resident, an accommodation was reached between the War Board and the leadership of the former, allowing Watkins to continue. He was easily re-elected in November, 1966, beating Democrat Louis F. Waldman, 81,516 to 48,656.

Watkins died in West Chester, Pennsylvania, from a heart attack during a speaking engagement at the Penn Oaks Country Club. He is interred at Birmingham-Lafayette Cemetery in Birmingham Township, Pennsylvania.

== Personal life ==
Watkins was married to Hilda Jane Smerback and together they had two sons. He operated a 60-acre farm in Delaware County and bred thoroughbred horses. He was a member of the Pennsylvania and American Trucking Associations.

== See also ==
- List of members of the United States Congress who died in office (1950–1999)

U.S. House of Representatives
Preceded by William H. Milliken, Jr.	Member of the U.S. House of Representatives from Pennsylvania's 7th congressional district 1965–1967	Succeeded by Lawrence Williams
Preceded by Paul Dague	Member of the U.S. House of Representatives from Pennsylvania's 9th congressional district 1967–1970	Succeeded by John Ware
Pennsylvania State Senate
Preceded by Weldon Brinton Heyburn	Member of the Pennsylvania Senate for the 9th District; 1949–1960	Succeeded by Clarence Bell
