= Charles A. Waters =

American politician (1892–1972)

59th Treasurer of Pennsylvania
- In office 1933–1937
- Governor: Gifford Pinchot; George Howard Earle III
- Preceded by: Edward Martin
- Succeeded by: F. Clair Ross

32nd Auditor General of Pennsylvania
- In office 1929–1933
- Governor: John Stuchell Fisher; Gifford Pinchot
- Preceded by: Edward Martin
- Succeeded by: Frank E. Baldwin

Personal details
- Born: February 17, 1892 Philadelphia, US
- Died: May 23, 1972 (aged 80) Margate City, New Jersey, US
- Party: Republican
- Education: Saint Joseph's University, University of Pennsylvania School of Law
- Occupation: Lawyer, judge, politician

Charles Aloysius Waters (February 17, 1892 – May 23, 1972) was an American lawyer, judge, and politician who served as Pennsylvania Auditor General (1929–1933), Pennsylvania Treasurer (1933–1937), and president judge of the Philadelphia County Court of Common Pleas (1953–1968). Waters was a member of the Republican Party from Philadelphia.

== Early life and education ==
Waters was born in Philadelphia on February 17, 1892. He graduated with his BA from Saint Joseph's College in 1913 and University of Pennsylvania Law School, gaining admittance to the Philadelphia Bar in 1916. When the U.S. joined World War I, Waters enlisted in the First Officers' Training Camp at Fort Niagara in New York and served in the Army during the conflict.

== Political and judicial career ==
After completing military service, Waters worked as an attorney for the Registration Commission in Philadelphia. Between 1922 and 1927, he held various positions in the state auditor's office, including assistant chief in the Bureau of Corporations, special deputy auditor general, and assistant deputy auditor general. On January 18, 1927, Governor John Stuchell Fisher appointed him as Secretary of the Department of Labor and Industry. Running on the Republican ticket, Waters was elected Pennsylvania Auditor General in 1928 and Pennsylvania State Treasurer in 1932, serving a single four-year term in each office. From 1937 to 1953 he worked as prothonotary of the Pennsylvania Supreme Court for the eastern part of the state. In 1953, Governor John S. Fine appointed Waters to the Philadelphia County Court of Common Pleas. He retired as president judge in 1968. His name was often floated as a candidate for governor or Philadelphia mayor, but he declined all appeals to run for higher office.

== Personal life ==
Waters was a member of the Union League of Philadelphia, the state bar association, and other associations. He was married and was survived by two sons (Daniel F. and Charles Jr.) and a daughter (Margaret). He died at his home in Margate City, New Jersey, on May 23, 1972.

Party political offices
Preceded by Edward Martin	Republican nominee for Treasurer of Pennsylvania; 1932	Succeeded by Frank L. Pinola
