= John H. Ware III =

American politician (1908–1997)

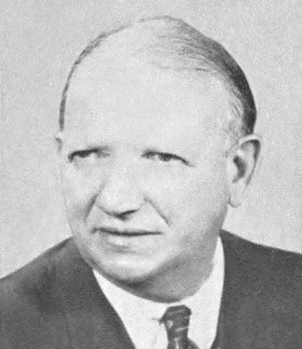

Member of the U.S. House of Representatives from Pennsylvania
- In office November 3, 1970 – January 3, 1975
- Preceded by: George Watkins (9th); William Green III (5th)
- Succeeded by: Bud Shuster (9th); Richard T. Schulze (5th)
- Constituency: 9th district (1970-73); 5th district (1973-75)

Member of the Pennsylvania Senate from the 19th district
- In office January 3, 1961 – August 28, 1970
- Preceded by: Thomas Harney
- Succeeded by: John Stauffer

Personal details
- Born: John Haines Ware III; August 29, 1908 Vineland, New Jersey, U.S.
- Died: July 29, 1997 (aged 88) Lancaster, Pennsylvania, U.S.
- Party: Republican
- Education: University of Pennsylvania

John Haines Ware III (August 29, 1908 – July 29, 1997) was an American politician who served as a Republican member of the U.S. House of Representatives for Pennsylvania's 9th congressional district from 1970 to 1973 and Pennsylvania's 5th congressional district from 1973 to 1975. He also served as a member of the Pennsylvania Senate for the 19th district from 1961 to 1970.

== Early life and education ==
Ware was born in Vineland, New Jersey. He graduated from the Wharton School of the University of Pennsylvania in 1930. He founded the Penn Fuel Gas Company and served as its president for 45 years. He also served as Chair of the Board for American Water.

== Political career ==
He served as burgess of the borough of Oxford, Pennsylvania, from 1956 to 1960. He was a member of the Pennsylvania State Senate for the 19th district from 1961 to 1970 and chairman of the Pennsylvania Republican finance committee. He was a trustee of the Lincoln University and the University of Pennsylvania.

He was elected simultaneously as a Republican to the 91st and to the 92nd Congress by special election to fill the vacancy caused by the death of George Watkins, and was reelected to the 93rd Congress, (November 3, 1970 – January 3, 1975); He was not a candidate for reelection in 1974.

== Death and interment ==
He died on July 29, 1997, in Lancaster, Pennsylvania, and is interred at the Oxford Cemetery.

== Legacy ==
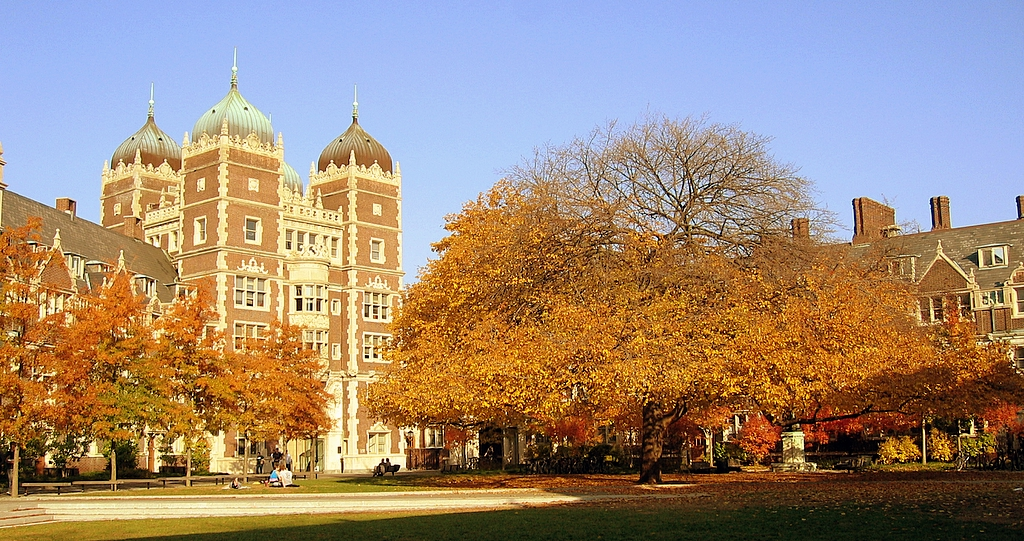
Ware Dormitory in the Fall.

The middle college house in the Quadrangle Dormitories at the University of Pennsylvania is named in his honor.

A Boy Scout and Cub Scout camp is also named in his honor. Part of the Horseshoe Scout Reservation, Camp John H. Ware III hosts many programs for scouting such as summer camps, NYLT, and camporees.

In 1999, the Ware family established the John H. Ware 3rd Endowed Professorship in Alzheimer's Research at the University of Pennsylvania Perelman School of Medicine in his honor.

On May 31, 2002, the U.S. Route 1 freeway in Chester County between the Maryland border and Kennett Square was designated the John H. Ware III Memorial Highway in honor of Ware, who pushed for the construction of the US 1 freeway in Chester County.

== Footnotes ==
Pennsylvania State Senate
Preceded by Thomas Harney	Member of the Pennsylvania Senate, 19th district 1961-1970	Succeeded by John Stauffer
U.S. House of Representatives
Preceded by George Watkins	Member of the U.S. House of Representatives from Pennsylvania's 9th congressional district 1970–1973	Succeeded by Bud Shuster
Preceded by William Green III	Member of the U.S. House of Representatives from Pennsylvania's 5th congressional district 1973–1975	Succeeded by Richard T. Schulze
