= Pennsylvania Auditor General =

Chief fiscal officer of the Commonwealth of Pennsylvania

Auditor General of the Commonwealth of Pennsylvania
- Seal of the auditor general of Pennsylvania

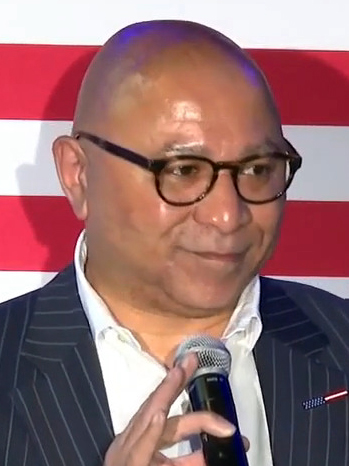
- Incumbent; Timothy DeFoor since January 19, 2021
- Term length: Four years, renewable once consecutively
- Inaugural holder: George Bryan Jr.
- Formation: 1809
- Website: Official website

The Pennsylvania auditor general is the chief fiscal officer of the Commonwealth of Pennsylvania. It became an elected office in 1850. The current auditor general is Republican Timothy DeFoor.

== History ==
The office of the auditor general was created by the General Assembly in 1809 to centralize oversight of public accounts. It assumed the responsibilities of two earlier fiscal officers: the comptroller general and the register general.

The office of comptroller general had been established in 1782 to audit, liquidate, and adjust the commonwealth’s accounts and manage financial claims in the aftermath of the American Revolution, with final approval originally resting with the Supreme Executive Council. In 1789, lawmakers created the office of register general to provide additional oversight, initially requiring the comptroller general to submit accounts for review. By 1790, most responsibilities for settling accounts had shifted to the register general, subject to the comptroller general’s approval and ultimately to the governor after the adoption of the Constitution of 1790.

Although procedures were modified over the following years, both offices continued in operation until 1809, when the General Assembly abolished the offices of comptroller general and register general and transferred their duties to the newly created auditor general. This reorganization established a single officer as the commonwealth’s chief fiscal overseer.

The auditor general was appointed by the governor until 1850, when it became a statewide elective office. The terms were for three years, until a constitutional amendment in 1909 increased the terms to four years.

== Responsibilities ==
The auditor general performs financial audits of state agencies, municipal governments, school districts, public sector pensions, entities that receive state funding support (such as certain universities and hospitals), and corporate tax returns. These audits are designed as an accountability mechanism and serve to ensure that public money is spent in an appropriate manner. Additionally, the auditor general undertakes performance audits, which are designed to determine program efficiency and effectiveness, of certain organizations, such as veteran's homes, prisons, and mental health centers.

== List of auditors general ==
No.	Name	Term	Party
1	George Bryan Jr.	1809–1821	Democratic
2	James Duncan	1821–1824	Democratic-Republican
3	David Mann	1824–1830	Democratic-Republican
4	Daniel Sturgeon	1830–1836	Democratic
5	Nathaniel P. Hobart	1836–1839	Anti-Masonic
6	George R. Espy	1839–1842	Democratic
7	William F. Packer	1842–1845	Democratic
8	John N. Purviance	1845–1851	Democratic
9	Ephraim Banks	1851–1857	Democratic
10	Jacob Fry Jr.	1857–1860	Democratic
11	Thomas E. Cochran	1860–1863	Republican
12	Isaac Slenker	1863–1866	Democratic
13	John F. Hartranft	1866–1872	Republican
14	Harrison Allen	1872–1875	Republican
15	Justus F. Temple	1875–1878	Democratic
16	William P. Schell	1878–1881	Democratic
17	John A. Lemon	1881–1884	Republican
18	Jerome B. Niles	1884–1887	Republican
19	A. Wilson Norris	1887–1888	Republican
20	Thomas McCamant	1888–1892	Republican
21	David McMurtrie Gregg	1892–1895	Republican
22	Amos H. Mylin	1895–1898	Republican
23	Levi G. McCauley	1898–1901	Republican
24	Edmund B. Hardenbergh	1901–1904	Republican
25	William Preston Snyder	1904–1907	Republican
26	Robert K. Young	1907–1910	Republican
27	A. E. Sisson	1910–1913	Republican
28	Archibald W. Powell	1913–1917	Republican
29	Charles A. Snyder	1917–1921	Republican
30	Samuel S. Lewis	1921–1925	Republican
31	Edward Martin	1925–1929	Republican
32	Charles A. Waters	1929–1933	Republican
33	Frank E. Baldwin	1933–1937	Republican
34	Warren R. Roberts	1937–1941	Democratic
35	F. Clair Ross	1941–1944	Democratic
36	Ted A. Rosenberg	1945	Democratic
37	G. Harold Wagner	1945–1949	Democratic
38	Weldon Brinton Heyburn	1949–1953	Republican
39	Charles R. Barber	1953–1957	Republican
40	Charles C. Smith	1957–1961	Republican
41	Thomas Z. Minehart	1961–1965	Democratic
42	Grace M. Sloan	1965–1969	Democratic
43	Bob Casey Sr.	1969–1977	Democratic
44	Al Benedict	1977–1985	Democratic
45	Donald A. Bailey	1985–1989	Democratic
46	Barbara Hafer	1989–1997	Republican
47	Bob Casey Jr.	1997–2005	Democratic
48	Jack Wagner	2005–2013	Democratic
49	Eugene DePasquale	2013–2021	Democratic
50	Timothy DeFoor	2021–	Republican

== See also ==
- Governor of Pennsylvania
- Pennsylvania Attorney General
- Pennsylvania Treasurer
- Pennsylvania General Assembly
- Pennsylvania State Capitol
