= Albert W. Johnson =

American politician

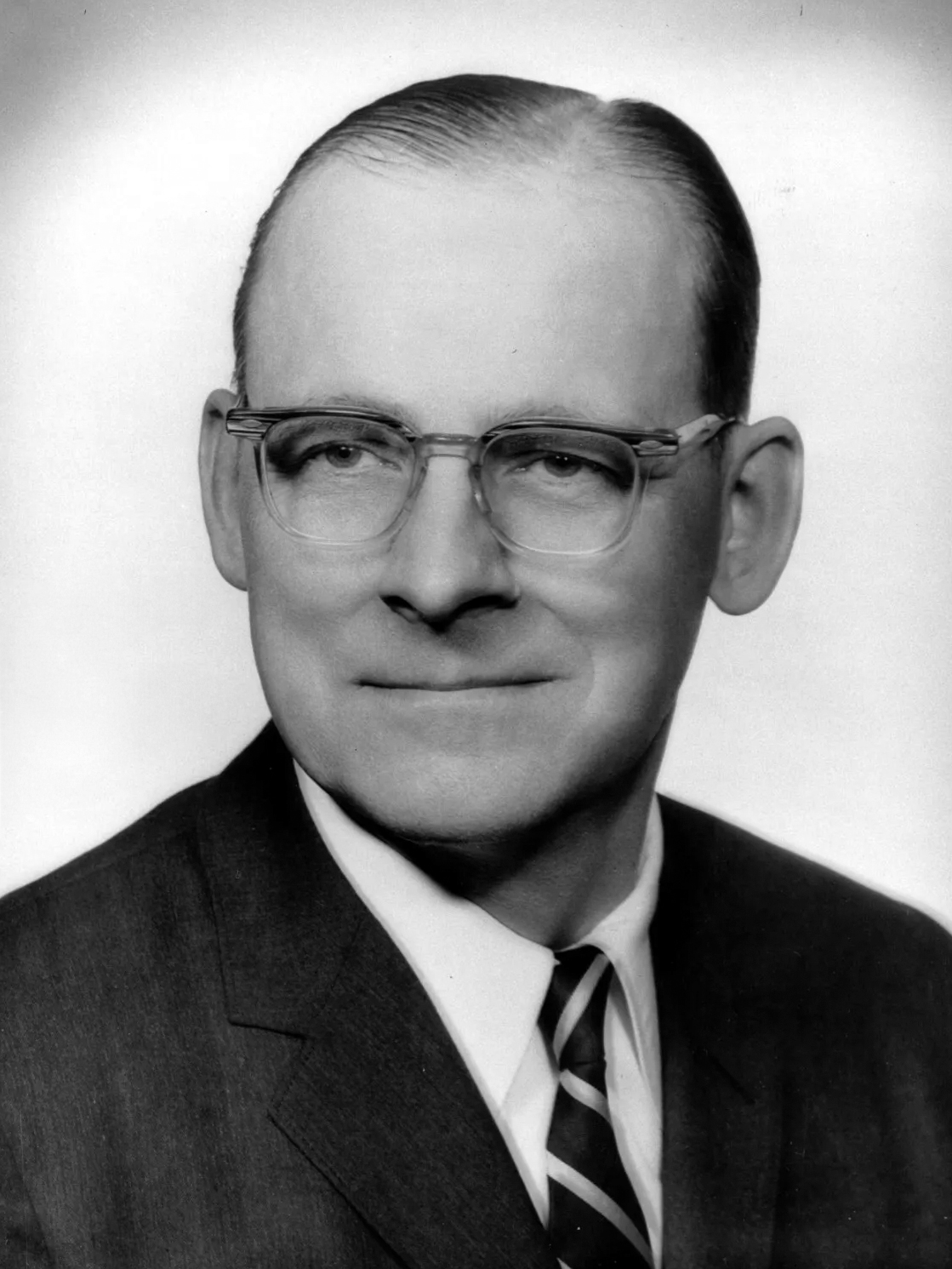

Member of the U.S. House of Representatives from Pennsylvania's 23rd district
- In office November 5, 1963 – January 3, 1977
- Preceded by: Leon Gavin
- Succeeded by: Joseph Ammerman

Republican Leader of the Pennsylvania House of Representatives
- In office January 1, 1957 – April 1, 1963
- Preceded by: Charles Smith
- Succeeded by: Kenneth Lee
- In office January 6, 1953 – November 30, 1954
- Preceded by: Charles Smith
- Succeeded by: Charles Smith

Member of the Pennsylvania House of Representatives from the McKean County district
- In office January 6, 1947 – April 1, 1963

Personal details
- Born: April 17, 1906 Smethport, Pennsylvania, U.S.
- Died: September 1, 1998 (aged 92) Boca Raton, Florida, U.S.
- Party: Republican
- Education: University of Pennsylvania, Stetson University

Albert Walter Johnson (April 17, 1906 – September 1, 1998) was a Republican member of the U.S. House of Representatives from Pennsylvania.

Albert W. Johnson was born in Smethport, Pennsylvania. He attended the Wharton School of the University of Pennsylvania from 1926 to 1929. He was a member of the Smethport Borough Council from 1933 to 1934. He received his LL.B. from the Stetson University College of Law in DeLand, Florida, in 1938. He became a member of the Pennsylvania State House of Representatives from 1947 to 1963 and served as majority whip in the 1951 session, and minority whip in the 1955 session. He was the majority leader in the 1953, 1957, and 1963 sessions, and the minority leader in the 1959 and 1961 sessions.

He was elected as a Republican to the 88th Congress, by special election, to fill the vacancy caused by the death of United States Representative Leon Gavin, and was reelected to the six succeeding Congresses. He was an unsuccessful candidate for reelection in 1976.

Johnson died from pneumonia at the age of 92.

== Sources ==
- United States Congress. "Albert W. Johnson (id: J000115)". Biographical Directory of the United States Congress.
- The Political Graveyard

U.S. House of Representatives
Preceded by Leon H. Gavin	Member of the U.S. House of Representatives from Pennsylvania's 23rd congressional district November 5, 1963 - January 3, 1977	Succeeded by Joseph S. Ammerman
Preceded by William B. Widnall	Ranking Member of the House Banking and Currency Committee; 1975–1977	Succeeded by J. William Stanton
