= Weldon Brinton Heyburn (Pennsylvania politician) =

American politician (1903-1979)

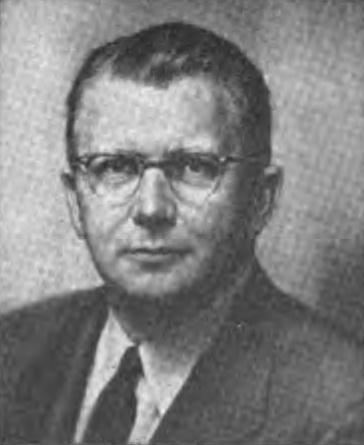
- Heyburn, c. 1956

Pennsylvania Senate, 9th Senatorial District
- In office 1937–1949
- Preceded by: John J. McClure
- Succeeded by: George Robert Watkins

38th Auditor General of Pennsylvania
- In office 1949–1953
- Governor: James H. Duff
- Preceded by: G. Harold Wagner
- Succeeded by: Charles R. Barber

64th Treasurer of Pennsylvania
- In office 1953–1957
- Governor: John S. Fine; George M. Leader
- Preceded by: Charles R. Barber
- Succeeded by: Robert F. Kent

Personal details
- Born: March 8, 1903 Concordville, Pennsylvania, U.S.
- Died: February 7, 1979 (aged 76)
- Resting place: Birmingham-Lafayette Cemetery, Birmingham Township, Pennsylvania, U.S.
- Party: Democrat (1937-1938), Republican (1938-1957)
- Spouse: Dorothy Schmidt

Weldon Brinton Heyburn (March 8, 1903 – February 7, 1979) was an American politician from Pennsylvania who served as a member of the Pennsylvania State Senate as a Democrat from 1937 to 1938 and then as a Republican from 1938 to 1949. He served as Pennsylvania State Auditor from 1949 to 1953 and as Pennsylvania State Treasurer from 1953 to 1957.

== Early life and education ==
Heyburn was born on March 8, 1903, in Concordville, Pennsylvania to Harry and Margaret (Darlington) Heyburn. He attended both public and private Quaker schools as well as the Maplewood Academy until age 15 when he completed his education at home. After graduation, Heyburn joined his father's dairy farm business, H.H. Heyburn & Sons in Concordville, Pennsylvania.

== Career ==
In 1936, Heyburn ran for Pennsylvania State Senate from Delaware County against the powerful incumbent Republican political boss, John J. McClure. Heyburn lost to McClure in the Republican primary by 17,000 votes, but Heyburn shocked the political establishment by running on the Democratic ticket and defeating McClure by 19,000 votes in the general election.

From 1937 to 1938, Heyburn caucused with the Democrats and served on the Senate Agriculture commission. In 1938, he re-aligned with the Republican caucus and served on the Labor and Industry, Finance, and Rules commissions. From 1947 to 1949, he served as president pro tempore of the Pennsylvania Senate. In 1949, he lost reelection to George Watkins.

Heyburn served as Pennsylvania Auditor General from 1949 to 1953 and as Pennsylvania State Treasurer from 1952 to 1957.

From 1949 to 1957, Heyburn served as Chair of the Delaware River Port Authority, president of the State Public School Building Association, secretary of the State Highway and Bridge Authority, as a member of the Brandywine Battlefield Park Commission and president of the American Association of Bridges, Tunnels and Turnpikes.

Heyburn served as board director, vice president and executive member of the Pennsylvania Motor Federation-AAA. In 1949, he became director and president of the Keystone Automobile Club of Philadelphia. He belonged to the Manufacturers and Bankers Club of Philadelphia and the Masons.

In 1967, he resigned from Heyburn & Sons and served as Delaware County representative to the SEPTA until 1973.

He served as a member of the Board of Governor's Traffic and Transportation Council of Greater Philadelphia. He chaired the Delaware County Soil and Water Conservation District and was on the board of directors of the Suburban Loan Company.

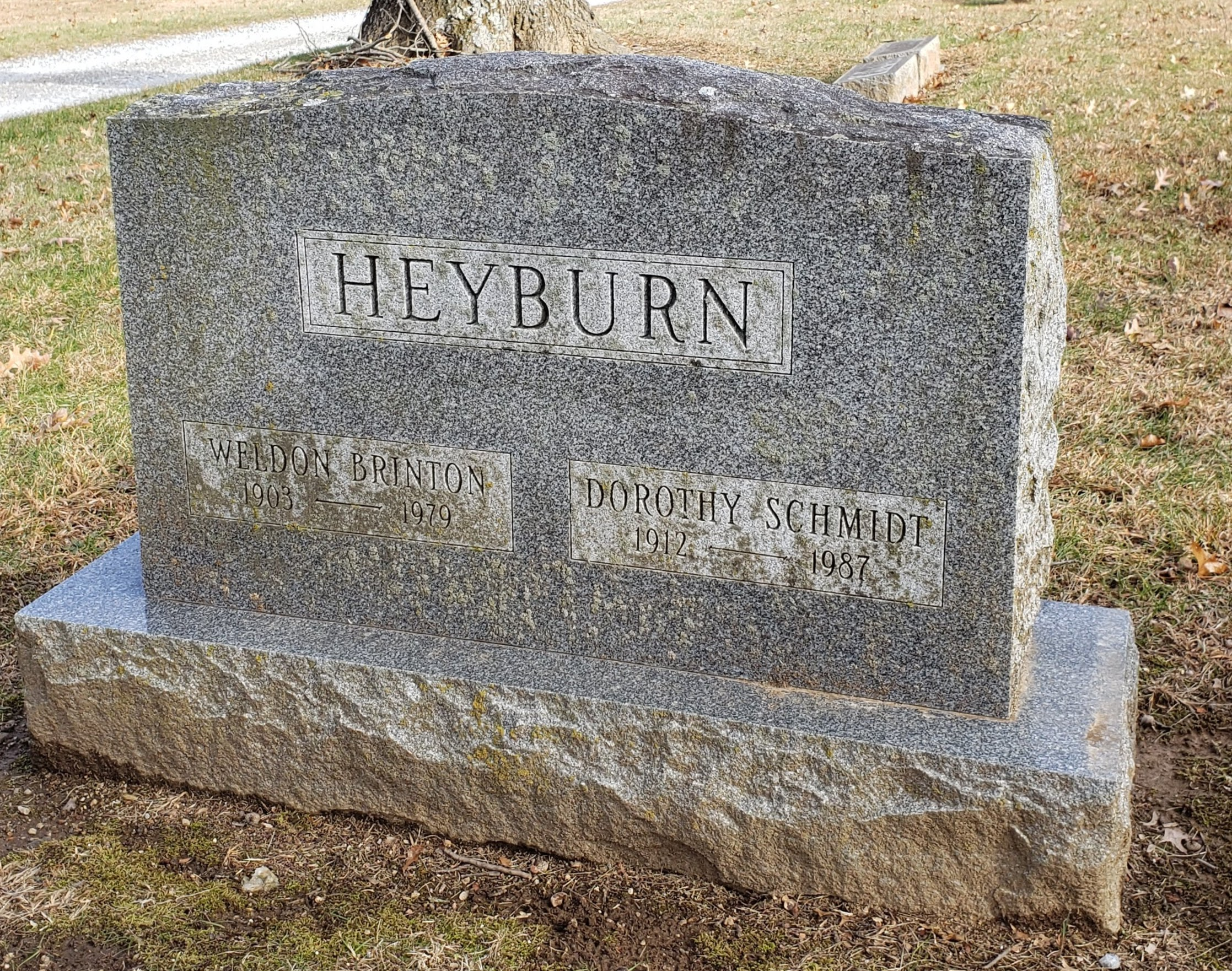
Weldon Brinton Heyburn grave in Birmingham-Lafayette Cemetery

Heyburn died on February 7, 1979, and was interred at the Birmingham-Lafayette cemetery in Birmingham Township, Pennsylvania.

Party political offices
Preceded by G. Harold Watkins	Republican nominee for Auditor General of Pennsylvania; 1948	Succeeded by Charles R. Barber
Preceded by Charles R. Barber	Republican nominee for Treasurer of Pennsylvania; 1952	Succeeded by Robert F. Kent
Pennsylvania State Senate
Preceded by John J. McClure	Member of the Pennsylvania Senate; 1937-1949	Succeeded by George Robert Watkins
Political offices
Preceded by G. Harold Wagner	Auditor General of Pennsylvania; 1949–1953	Succeeded by Charles R. Barber
Preceded by Charles R. Barber	Treasurer of Pennsylvania; 1952–1957	Succeeded by Robert F. Kent
