= Lawrence G. Williams =

American politician

Lawrence Gordon Williams
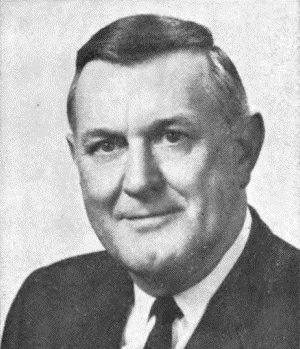

Member of the U.S. House of Representatives from Pennsylvania's 7th district
- In office January 3, 1967 – January 3, 1975
- Preceded by: George Watkins
- Succeeded by: Bob Edgar

Personal details
- Born: September 15, 1913 Pittsburgh, Pennsylvania, U.S.
- Died: July 13, 1975 (aged 61) Philadelphia, Pennsylvania, U.S.
- Party: Republican
- Education: Drexel Institute of Technology

Lawrence Gordon Williams (September 15, 1913 – July 13, 1975) was an American businessman and military veteran who served four terms as a Republican member of the U.S. House of Representatives, representing the 7th district of Pennsylvania from 1967 to 1975.

== Biography ==
Williams was born in Pittsburgh, Pennsylvania. He moved to Philadelphia in June 1922. He attended Drexel Institute of Technology. He was a commissioner (1952–1966) and president of the board (1960–1966) of the township of Springfield, Pennsylvania. He was employed by the Curtis Publishing Company from 1936 to 1966, and retired as assistant to the senior vice president in charge of manufacturing.

He served in the Army Air Corps during the Second World War. He was Delaware County’s representative on the policy committee on the Penn-Jersey Transportation Study, 1959–1966, Delaware Valley Regional Planning Commission, and the Southeastern Pennsylvania Transportation Authority. He was the past president of the Pennsylvania State Association of Township Commissioners.

=== Congress ===
He was elected in 1966 as a Republican to the 90th and to the three succeeding Congresses. He was an unsuccessful candidate for renomination in 1974.

=== Later career and death ===
He was appointed by President Gerald Ford as special assistant to the co-chairman of the Ozarks Regional Commission and served in that capacity from January 20, 1975, until his death.

He is buried at Edgewood Memorial Park in Glen Mills, Pennsylvania.

== Sources ==
- United States Congress. "Lawrence G. Williams (id: W000525)". Biographical Directory of the United States Congress.

U.S. House of Representatives
Preceded by G. Robert Watkins	Member of the U.S. House of Representatives from Pennsylvania's 7th congressional district 1967–1975	Succeeded by Robert W. Edgar
