= Treasurer of Pennsylvania =

Head of the Pennsylvania Treasury Department

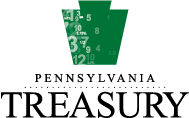
- Logo of the Pennsylvania State Treasury

- Flag of the Commonwealth of Pennsylvania

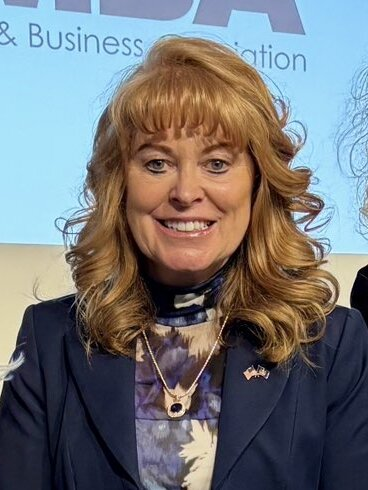
- Incumbent; Stacy Garrity since January 19, 2021
- Seat: 129 Finance Building, Harrisburg, Pennsylvania, U.S.
- Term length: Four years, renewable once consecutively
- Inaugural holder: David Rittenhouse
- Formation: 1777
- Website: Official website

The treasurer of Pennsylvania is the head of the Pennsylvania Treasury Department, an independent department of the commonwealth's government. The treasurer is elected every four years. The current treasurer is Republican Stacy Garrity.

== Pennsylvania Treasury Department ==
As the name "Treasury" suggests, the department's paramount responsibility is safeguarding and managing the state's financial assets, but Pennsylvania's constitution and statutes place additional specific responsibilities on the office.

Taxes and other sources of revenue collected by the state are deposited with the Treasury. The department uses that money to make payments on behalf of state government, including payroll for state employees and charges incurred by government agencies. Before issuing payments, Treasury's Bureau of Fiscal Review must carefully examine invoices to make certain the charges are lawful and correct.

While managing cash flow to ensure that enough money is on hand to meet financial obligations, Treasury also places funds in widely diversified short-term and long-term investments to earn income for state taxpayers. It also holds and/or invests funds for other government agencies, such as the state pension boards. As of 2014, Treasury is custodian of approximately $100 billion in public assets.

=== PA 529 College Savings Program ===
The PA 529 College Savings Program gives families a tax-advantaged way to make college possible for their children.

=== Unclaimed property ===
Treasury's Unclaimed Property Bureau works to reunite more than $2 billion in lost, forgotten and abandoned property with its rightful owners. Since 2009, Treasury has collected $1.134 billion in abandoned property and returned $518 million back to the rightful owners, netting $616 million for the state General Fund budget.

=== INVEST ===
The Pennsylvania Treasury's cylindrical vault was designed by Frederick S. Holmes and built by the York Safe & Lock Co. in 1940. Only three cylindrical vaults are known to exist.

The INVEST program helps local governments and nonprofits invest their money with flexibility, security, and confidence. INVEST uses Treasury's professional investment expertise, minus the high costs of other investment programs. With less money spent on management fees, more money is spent on Pennsylvania's communities.

=== Responsibilities ===
1. Conducting investigations of loss, theft, or fraud involving commonwealth checks.
2. Reviewing and approving real estate leases and sole source contracts entered into by commonwealth agencies before such leases and contracts can become effective.
3. Housing the Pennsylvania Contracts e-Library. In response to the new Right-to-Know Law signed by Governor Ed Rendell on February 14, 2008, Treasury is required to make available certain government contract information for public inspection by posting it on a publicly accessible Web site.

=== State boards ===
The department's reach also extends to the many state boards on which the treasurer serves. For example, as the chairperson of the Board of Finance and Revenue, the treasurer directs the selection of the banks where state funds are deposited and sets the interest rates paid on them. The treasurer also serves on boards that oversee state pension funds and has a voice in how these funds are managed and invested. Other board-related activities allow the treasurer to help provide Pennsylvania schools with tax-exempt financing for modernization, make grants to distressed communities, and finance the purchase of rental housing for residents in need.

=== Other services ===
The Treasury provides several other services to state residents, such as financial education programs for individuals and businesses, and a debit card for recipients of unemployment compensation and workers compensation benefits. It makes low-interest loans available for energy efficiency improvements in residential homes through Keystone HELP, and invests in energy upgrades in college and university buildings through its Campus Energy Efficiency Fund.

== History ==
Results by county of the 1872 state treasurer referendum Yes: 90–100%; 80–90%; No vote

In 1872, Pennsylvania voters approved an amendment to the Pennsylvania Constitution that gave the electorate the power to elect a state treasurer, rather than the position being appointed by the state legislature.

== List of Pennsylvania treasurers ==
Portrait	Name	Term	Party
	Samuel Carpenter	1704–1710, 1711–1713	
	David Rittenhouse	1777–1789	
	Christian Febiger	1789–1797	
	Peter Baynton	1797–1801	
	Jacob Carpenter	1801–1802	
	Isaac Weaver Jr.	1802–1807	Democratic-Republican
	William Findlay	1807–1817	Democratic-Republican
	R. M. Crain	1817–1820	
	John B. Trevor	1820–1821	
	William Clark	1821–1827	
	Alexander Mahon	1827–1835	
	Joseph Lawrence	1835–1836	
	Daniel Sturgeon	1836–1840	Democratic
	Almon Heath Read	1840–1841	Democratic
	John Gilmore	1841–1842	
	Job Mann	1842–1845	
	James Ross Snowden	1845–1847	Democratic
	John Banks	1847–1848	Whig
	Arnold Plumer	1848–1849	Democratic
	Gideon J. Ball	1849–1850	
	John M. Bickel	1850–1854	Democratic
	Joseph Bailey	1854–1855	Democratic
	Eli Slifer	1855–1856	Whig
	Henry S. Magraw	1856–1859	
	Eli Slifer	1859–1861	Republican
	Henry Dunning Moore	1861–1863	Republican
	William V. McGrath	1863–1864	
	Henry Dunning Moore	1864–1865	Republican
	William H. Kemble	1865–1868	Republican
	William Wilken Irwin	1868–1869	
	Robert W. Mackey	1869–1870	Republican
	William Wilken Irwin	1870–1871	
	Robert W. Mackey	1871–1876	Republican
	Henry Rawle	1876–1878	Republican
	Amos C. Noyes	1878–1880	Democratic
	Samuel Butler	1880–1882	Republican
	Silas M. Bailey	1882–1884	Republican
	William Livsey	1884–1886	Republican
	Matthew Quay	1886–1887	Republican
	William Livsey	1887–1888	Republican
	William B. Hart	1888–1889	Republican
	William Livsey	1889–1890	Republican
	Henry K. Boyer	1890–1892	Republican
	John W. Morrison	1892–1894	Republican
	Samuel M. Jackson	1894–1896	Republican
	Benjamin J. Haywood	1896–1898	Republican
	James S. Beacom	1898–1900	Republican
	James E. Barnett	1900–1902	Republican
	Frank G. Harris	1902–1904	Republican
	William L. Mathues	1904–1906	Republican
	William H. Berry	1907–1908	Democratic
	John O. Sheatz	1908–1911	Republican
	Charles Frederick Wright	1911–1913	Republican
	Robert K. Young	1913–1917	Republican
	Harmon M. Kephart	1917–1921	Republican
	Charles A. Snyder	1921–1925	Republican
	Samuel S. Lewis	1925–1929	Republican
	Edward Martin	1929–1933	Republican
	Charles A. Waters	1933–1937	Republican
	F. Clair Ross	1937–1941	Democratic
	G. Harold Wagner	1941–1945	Democratic
	Ramsey S. Black	1945–1949	Democratic
	Charles R. Barber	1949–1953	Republican
	Weldon Brinton Heyburn	1953–1957	Republican
	Robert F. Kent	1957–1961	Republican
	Grace M. Sloan	1961–1965	Democratic
	Thomas Z. Minehart	1965–1969	Democratic
	Grace M. Sloan	1969–1977	Democratic
	Robert E. Casey	1977–1981	Democratic
	R. Budd Dwyer	1981–1987	Republican
	G. Davis Greene Jr.	1987–1989	Democratic
	Catherine Baker Knoll	1989–1997	Democratic
	Barbara Hafer	1997–2005	Republican
	Bob Casey Jr.	2005–2007	Democratic
	Robin Wiessmann	2007–2009	Democratic
	Rob McCord	2009–2015	Democratic
	Tim Reese	2015–2017	Independent
	Joe Torsella	2017–2021	Democratic
	Stacy Garrity	2021–	Republican
