= 1996 Pennsylvania State Treasurer election =

- November 5, 1996

Nominee	Barbara Hafer	Mina Baker Knoll
Party	Republican	Democratic
Popular vote	2,041,081	1,952,613
Percentage	47.94%	45.86%
- Hafer: 40–50% 50–60% 60–70% Knoll: 40–50% 50–60% 60–70% 70–80% 80–90% >90%
Treasurer before election
Catherine Baker Knoll
Democratic
Elected Treasurer
Barbara Hafer
Republican

The 1996 Pennsylvania State Treasurer election was held on November 5, 1996 in order to elect the Treasurer of Pennsylvania. Incumbent treasurer Catherine Baker Knoll was term-limited, leaving an open race. Knoll's daughter, Mina Baker Knoll, won the Democratic nomination but was defeated in the general election by Republican State Auditor Barbara Hafer.

The race was noted for the bitterness between the candidates. Hafer questioned Knoll's residency because she had been living in New York City and Knoll attacked Hafer's leadership as auditor general. The enmity would result in Catherine Baker Knoll challenging Hafer for treasurer in 2000.

== Democratic primary ==
=== Candidates ===
- Mina Baker Knoll, accountant and daughter of incumbent treasurer Catherine Baker Knoll
- Franklin Kury, former member of the Pennsylvania State Senate and State House of Representatives
- Richard J. Orloski

=== Results ===
Primary results by county Knoll: 40%–50%; 50%–60%; 60%–70%; 70%–80%; Orloski: 40%–50%; 50%–60%; Kury: 30%–40%; 40%–50%; 50%–60%

Democratic primary results
Party	Candidate	Votes	%
Democratic	Mina Baker Knoll	411,617	61.67
Democratic	Richard J. Orloski	137,452	20.59
Democratic	Franklin Kury	118,336	17.73
Total votes		667,405	100.00

== Republican primary ==
Barbara Hafer, incumbent Auditor General of Pennsylvania, ran unopposed in the primary.

=== Results ===
Republican primary results
Party	Candidate	Votes	%
Republican	Barbara Hafer	546,996	100.00
Total votes		546,996	100.00

== General election ==
On election day, Republican nominee Barbara Hafer won the election by a margin of 88,468 votes against her foremost opponent, Democratic nominee Mina Baker Knoll, thereby gaining control of the office for the Republicans.

=== Results ===
Pennsylvania Auditor General election, 1996
Party	Candidate	Votes	%
Republican	Barbara Hafer	2,041,081	47.94
Democratic	Mina Baker Knoll	1,952,613	45.86
Reform	Michael S. Klein	119,158	2.80
Constitution	Dean L. Snyder	88,452	2.08
Libertarian	John D. Famularo	56,602	1.33
Total votes		4,257,906	100.00
Republican gain from Democratic			
