= Norwood Incline =

Railway

Coordinates: 40.47426°N 80.06553°W

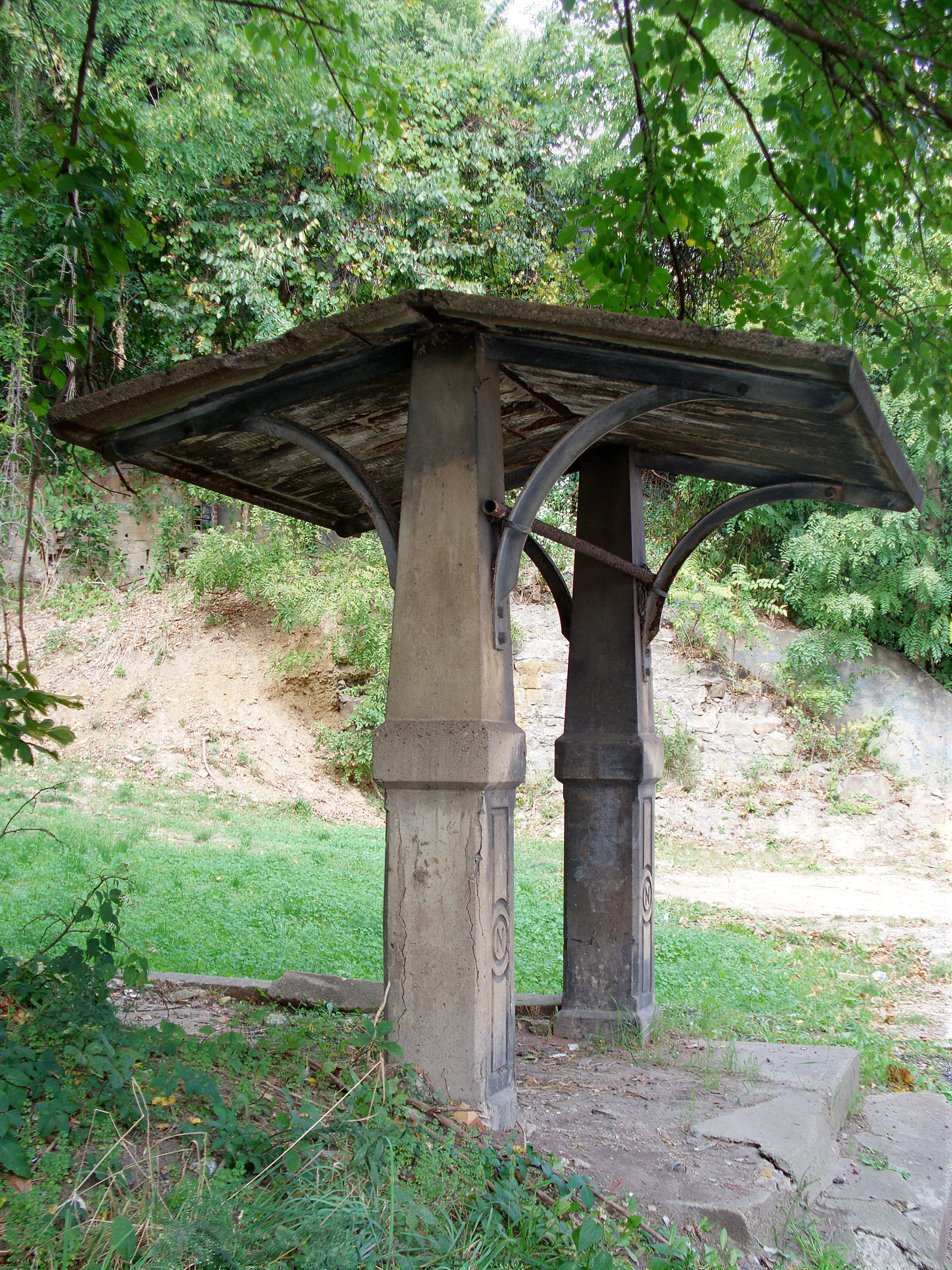
A shelter for passengers waiting at the base station is the only visible remnant of the vanished Norwood Incline

The Norwood Incline was a funicular railway located just outside Pittsburgh, Pennsylvania, United States. It operated from 1901 to 1923 between its lower station on Island Avenue, McKees Rocks, and its upper station in Norwood Place, Stowe Township. Originally free to ride, it got the nickname "Penny Incline" after it started charging a one-cent fare. Its two narrow-gauge tracks were formed by only three rails, the middle rail being shared by both tracks, except at mid-slope where the tracks separated to allow the upbound and downbound cars to pass each other.

== See also ==
- List of funicular railways
- List of inclines in Pittsburgh
