= 1990 Pennsylvania gubernatorial election =

- November 6, 1990
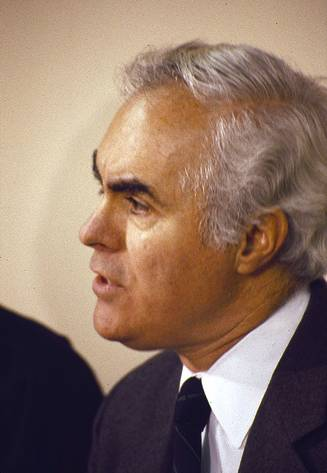

| Nominee | Bob Casey | Barbara Hafer |
| Party | Democratic | Republican |
| Running mate | Mark Singel | Harold Mowery |
| Popular vote | 2,065,244 | 987,516 |
| Percentage | 67.63% | 32.34% |
- Casey: 50–60% 60–70% 70–80% 80–90% >90% Hafer: 40–50% 50–60% 60–70% 80–90% Tie: 40–50% 50% No data
Governor before election
Robert P. Casey
Democratic
Elected Governor
Robert P. Casey
Democratic

The 1990 Pennsylvania gubernatorial election was held on November 6, 1990. Incumbent Democratic governor Robert P. Casey easily defeated Republican Barbara Hafer. Governor Casey defeated Hafer by a margin of 35.29%, and carried 66 out of 67 Pennsylvania counties.

This was the first election since 1974 that a Democrat carried Bucks County, the first since 1906 that a Democrat won Chester County, the first since 1829 that a Democrat won Delaware County, and the last time as of 2023 that a Democrat won York County.

Casey achieved the second-largest gubernatorial landslide in the state in the 20th century (and the largest victory for a Democrat), losing only Montgomery County by just 586 votes.

== Democratic primary ==
=== Candidates ===
- Bob Casey, incumbent Governor since 1987
- Philip J. Berg, attorney and perennial candidate from Montgomery County

Incumbent Bob Casey was challenged by Philip J. Berg, an attorney and perennial candidate from Montgomery County.

=== Results ===
Democratic primary results Casey: 50%–60%; 60%–70%; 70%–80%; 80%–90%; 90%–100%; Berg: 50%–60%

Pennsylvania gubernatorial Democratic primary election, 1990
| Party | Candidate | Votes | % |
|---|---|---|---|
| Democratic | Bob Casey | 636,594 | 77.54 |
| Democratic | Philip J. Berg | 184,365 | 22.46 |
| Total votes | | 820,959 | 100.00 |

== Republican primary ==
=== Candidates ===
- Barbara Hafer, Auditor General and candidate for Lieutenant Governor
- Peg Luksik, anti-abortion activist

Endorsed Republican candidate Barbara Hafer, Auditor General and former candidate for Lt. Governor, won a surprisingly close race over Peg Luksik, an outspoken opponent of abortion.

=== Results ===
Republican primary results Hafer: 50%-60%; 60%-70%; 70%-80%; Luksik: 50%–60%; 60%–70%

Pennsylvania gubernatorial Republican primary election, 1990
| Party | Candidate | Votes | % |
|---|---|---|---|
| Republican | Barbara Hafer | 321,026 | 54.43 |
| Republican | Peg Luksik | 268,773 | 45.57 |
| Total votes | | 589,799 | 100.00 |

== General Election ==
=== Candidates ===
- Bob Casey, incumbent Governor (Democratic)
  - running mate: Mark Singel, incumbent Lieutenant Governor
- Barbara Hafer, Pennsylvania Auditor General (Republican)
  - running mate: Harold Mowery, State Representative

=== Campaign ===
Casey had maintained enormous popularity in the state, was considered to have a generally positive record from his first term as governor, and was endorsed by major newspapers statewide, including The Philadelphia Inquirer. In addition, Casey had the traditionally strong backing of urban voters and organized labor, and performed well in many heavily Republican, rural counties, as he was seen as a relatively conservative populist.

The campaign briefly turned ugly when Hafer, a pro-choice Republican who had attempted to position herself as the more liberal candidate, referred to Casey as a "redneck Irishman." Her comment, which was widely reported, helped to alienate both rural voters and those of Irish descent. Unable to gain a funding foothold or to carve out a strong public image, and trailing in the polls by forty percent on election day, Hafer was subsequently defeated by Casey by a large margin.

=== Results ===
Pennsylvania gubernatorial election, 1990
| Party | Candidate | Running mate | Votes | Percentage |
|---|---|---|---|---|
| Democratic | Bob Casey (incumbent) | Mark Singel (incumbent) | 2,065,244 | 67.63% |
| Republican | Barbara Hafer | Harold Mowery | 987,463 | 32.34% |
| Write-ins | Write-ins | | 906 | 0.03% |
| Totals | | | 3,053,666 | 100.00% |
| Voter turnout (Voting age population) | | | | 53.96% |

=== Results by county ===
| County | Bob Casey Democratic | | Barbara Hafer Republican | | Various candidates Other parties | | Margin | | Total votes cast |
| County | # | % | # | % | # | % | # | % | Total votes cast |
|---|---|---|---|---|---|---|---|---|---|
| Adams | 13,890 | 70.95% | 5,687 | 29.05% | 15 | 0.00% | 8,203 | 41.90% | 19,577 |
| Allegheny | 281,883 | 71.95% | 109,895 | 28.05% | 0 | 0.00% | 171,988 | 43.90% | 391,778 |
| Armstrong | 14,077 | 69.45% | 6,192 | 30.55% | 0 | 0.00% | 7,885 | 38.90% | 20,269 |
| Beaver | 43,348 | 76.15% | 13,577 | 23.85% | 315 | 0.00% | 29,771 | 52.30% | 56,925 |
| Bedford | 7,709 | 61.26% | 4,876 | 38.74% | 0 | 0.00% | 2,833 | 22.52% | 12,585 |
| Berks | 47,887 | 61.81% | 29,589 | 38.19% | 203 | 0.00% | 18,298 | 23.62% | 77,476 |
| Blair | 20,713 | 68.11% | 9,698 | 31.89% | 0 | 0.00% | 11,015 | 36.22% | 30,411 |
| Bradford | 7,063 | 55.50% | 5,663 | 44.50% | 51 | 0.00% | 1,400 | 11.00% | 12,726 |
| Bucks | 81,715 | 58.58% | 57,783 | 41.42% | 0 | 0.00% | 23,932 | 17.16% | 139,498 |
| Butler | 25,327 | 66.58% | 12,715 | 33.42% | 0 | 0.00% | 12,612 | 33.16% | 38,042 |
| Cambria | 40,331 | 79.97% | 10,104 | 20.03% | 0 | 0.00% | 30,227 | 59.94% | 50,435 |
| Cameron | 1,314 | 64.57% | 721 | 35.43% | 3 | 0.00% | 593 | 29.14% | 2,035 |
| Carbon | 9,773 | 70.10% | 4,169 | 29.90% | 0 | 0.00% | 5,604 | 40.20% | 13,942 |
| Centre | 17,442 | 59.39% | 11,925 | 40.61% | 0 | 0.00% | 5,517 | 18.78% | 29,367 |
| Chester | 48,935 | 52.48% | 44,307 | 47.52% | 0 | 0.00% | 4,628 | 4.96% | 93,242 |
| Clarion | 7,235 | 65.50% | 3,811 | 34.50% | 0 | 0.00% | 3,424 | 31.00% | 11,046 |
| Clearfield | 16,464 | 73.97% | 5,793 | 26.03% | 0 | 0.00% | 10,671 | 47.94% | 22,257 |
| Clinton | 6,796 | 70.59% | 2,832 | 29.41% | 0 | 0.00% | 3,964 | 41.18% | 9,628 |
| Columbia | 9,449 | 68.05% | 4,436 | 31.95% | 15 | 0.00% | 5,013 | 36.10% | 13,885 |
| Crawford | 16,154 | 66.72% | 8,056 | 33.28% | 15 | 0.00% | 8,098 | 33.44% | 24,210 |
| Cumberland | 32,487 | 66.06% | 16,692 | 33.94% | 0 | 0.00% | 15,795 | 32.12% | 49,179 |
| Dauphin | 43,063 | 71.90% | 16,833 | 28.10% | 0 | 0.00% | 26,230 | 43.80% | 59,896 |
| Delaware | 92,865 | 54.82% | 76,531 | 45.18% | 0 | 0.00% | 16,334 | 9.64% | 169,396 |
| Elk | 8,757 | 77.28% | 2,575 | 22.72% | 0 | 0.00% | 6,182 | 54.56% | 11,332 |
| Erie | 52,168 | 71.86% | 20,424 | 28.14% | 0 | 0.00% | 31,744 | 43.72% | 72,592 |
| Fayette | 28,719 | 83.00% | 5,882 | 17.00% | 0 | 0.00% | 22,837 | 66.00% | 34,601 |
| Forest | 1,104 | 64.98% | 595 | 35.02% | 3 | 0.00% | 509 | 29.96% | 1,699 |
| Franklin | 15,126 | 64.13% | 8,461 | 35.87% | 0 | 0.00% | 6,665 | 28.26% | 23,587 |
| Fulton | 1,939 | 62.31% | 1,173 | 37.69% | 0 | 0.00% | 766 | 24.62% | 3,112 |
| Greene | 7,998 | 78.76% | 2,157 | 21.24% | 0 | 0.00% | 5,841 | 57.52% | 10,155 |
| Huntingdon | 6,656 | 65.60% | 3,490 | 34.40% | 0 | 0.00% | 3,166 | 31.20% | 10,146 |
| Indiana | 15,692 | 70.32% | 6,622 | 29.68% | 0 | 0.00% | 9,070 | 40.64% | 22,314 |
| Jefferson | 8,117 | 67.44% | 3,918 | 32.56% | 0 | 0.00% | 4,199 | 34.88% | 12,035 |
| Juniata | 4,617 | 73.82% | 1,637 | 26.18% | 0 | 0.00% | 2,980 | 47.64% | 6,254 |
| Lackawanna | 49,393 | 81.88% | 10,930 | 18.12% | 0 | 0.00% | 38,463 | 63.76% | 60,323 |
| Lancaster | 66,069 | 72.89% | 24,569 | 27.11% | 0 | 0.00% | 41,500 | 45.78% | 90,638 |
| Lawrence | 19,563 | 72.87% | 7,282 | 27.13% | 80 | 0.03% | 12,281 | 45.74% | 26,845 |
| Lebanon | 18,776 | 69.98% | 8,055 | 30.02% | 0 | 0.00% | 10,721 | 39.96% | 26,831 |
| Lehigh | 42,592 | 63.47% | 24,519 | 36.53% | 44 | 0.00% | 18,073 | 26.94% | 67,111 |
| Luzerne | 60,043 | 80.56% | 14,448 | 19.44% | 0 | 0.00% | 45,555 | 61.12% | 74,531 |
| Lycoming | 17,238 | 66.64% | 8,628 | 33.36% | 19 | 0.00% | 8,610 | 33.28% | 25,866 |
| McKean | 5,151 | 56.95% | 3,893 | 43.05% | 0 | 0.00% | 1,258 | 13.90% | 9,044 |
| Mercer | 24,078 | 69.68% | 10,479 | 30.32% | 1 | 0.00% | 13,599 | 39.66% | 34,557 |
| Mifflin | 6,472 | 69.94% | 2,781 | 30.06% | 0 | 0.00% | 3,691 | 39.88% | 9,253 |
| Monroe | 12,243 | 64.42% | 6,761 | 35.58% | 0 | 0.00% | 5,482 | 28.84% | 19,004 |
| Montgomery | 89,465 | 49.84% | 90,051 | 50.16% | 0 | 0.00% | -586 | -0.32% | 179,516 |
| Montour | 2,666 | 68.94% | 1,201 | 31.06% | 0 | 0.00% | 1,465 | 37.88% | 3,867 |
| Northampton | 38,862 | 68.04% | 18,253 | 31.96% | 0 | 0.00% | 20,609 | 36.08% | 57,115 |
| Northumberland | 17,948 | 73.75% | 6,388 | 26.25% | 0 | 0.00% | 11,560 | 47.00% | 24,336 |
| Perry | 6,205 | 65.68% | 3,242 | 34.32% | 0 | 0.00% | 2,693 | 31.36% | 9,447 |
| Philadelphia | 276,427 | 70.79% | 114,078 | 29.21% | 4 | 0.00% | 162,349 | 41.58% | 390,505 |
| Pike | 3,122 | 55.25% | 2,529 | 44.75% | 0 | 0.00% | 593 | 10.50% | 5,651 |
| Potter | 2,398 | 57.59% | 1,766 | 42.41% | 0 | 0.00% | 632 | 15.18% | 4,164 |
| Schuylkill | 29,832 | 70.32% | 12,591 | 29.68% | 0 | 0.00% | 17,241 | 40.64% | 42,423 |
| Snyder | 4,777 | 63.91% | 2,697 | 36.09% | 0 | 0.00% | 2,080 | 27.82% | 7,474 |
| Somerset | 17,610 | 71.74% | 6,937 | 28.26% | 0 | 0.00% | 10,673 | 43.48% | 24,547 |
| Sullivan | 1,207 | 59.11% | 835 | 40.89% | 0 | 0.00% | 372 | 18.22% | 2,042 |
| Susquehanna | 6,655 | 67.50% | 3,204 | 32.50% | 0 | 0.00% | 3,451 | 35.00% | 9,859 |
| Tioga | 5,737 | 57.10% | 4,310 | 42.90% | 0 | 0.00% | 1,427 | 14.20% | 10,047 |
| Union | 4,694 | 65.80% | 2,440 | 34.20% | 0 | 0.00% | 2,254 | 31.60% | 7,134 |
| Venango | 9,999 | 67.12% | 4,899 | 32.88% | 0 | 0.00% | 5,100 | 34.24% | 14,898 |
| Warren | 9,260 | 69.04% | 4,153 | 30.96% | 39 | 0.00% | 5,107 | 38.08% | 13,413 |
| Washington | 40,354 | 74.61% | 13,734 | 25.39% | 0 | 0.00% | 26,620 | 49.22% | 54,088 |
| Wayne | 5,882 | 62.67% | 3,503 | 37.33% | 9 | 0.00% | 2,379 | 25.34% | 9,385 |
| Westmoreland | 71,922 | 74.95% | 24,039 | 25.05% | 90 | 0.00% | 47,883 | 49.90% | 95,961 |
| Wyoming | 4,434 | 69.25% | 1,969 | 30.75% | 0 | 0.00% | 2,465 | 38.50% | 6,403 |
| York | 57,394 | 71.00% | 23,440 | 29.00% | 0 | 0.00% | 33,954 | 42.00% | 80,834 |
| Totals | 2,065,281 | 67.65% | 987,643 | 32.35% | 906 | 0.00% | 1,077,818 | 35.30% | 3,052,744 |

Counties that flipped from Republican to Democratic

- Adams
- Adams
- Bedford
- Berks
- Blair
- Bradford
- Bucks
- Butler
- Cameron
- Centre
- Chester
- Clarion
- Crawford
- Cumberland
- Dauphin
- Delaware
- Forest
- Franklin
- Fulton
- Huntingdon
- Erie
- Jefferson
- Juniata
- Lancaster
- Lebanon
- Lehigh
- Lycoming
- McKean
- Mifflin
- Monroe
- Perry
- Pike
- Potter
- Snyder
- Sullivan
- Susquehanna
- Tioga
- Venango
- Warren
- Union
- Wayne
- Wyoming
- York
