= Stowe Tunnel =

Road tunnel in Pennsylvania, United States

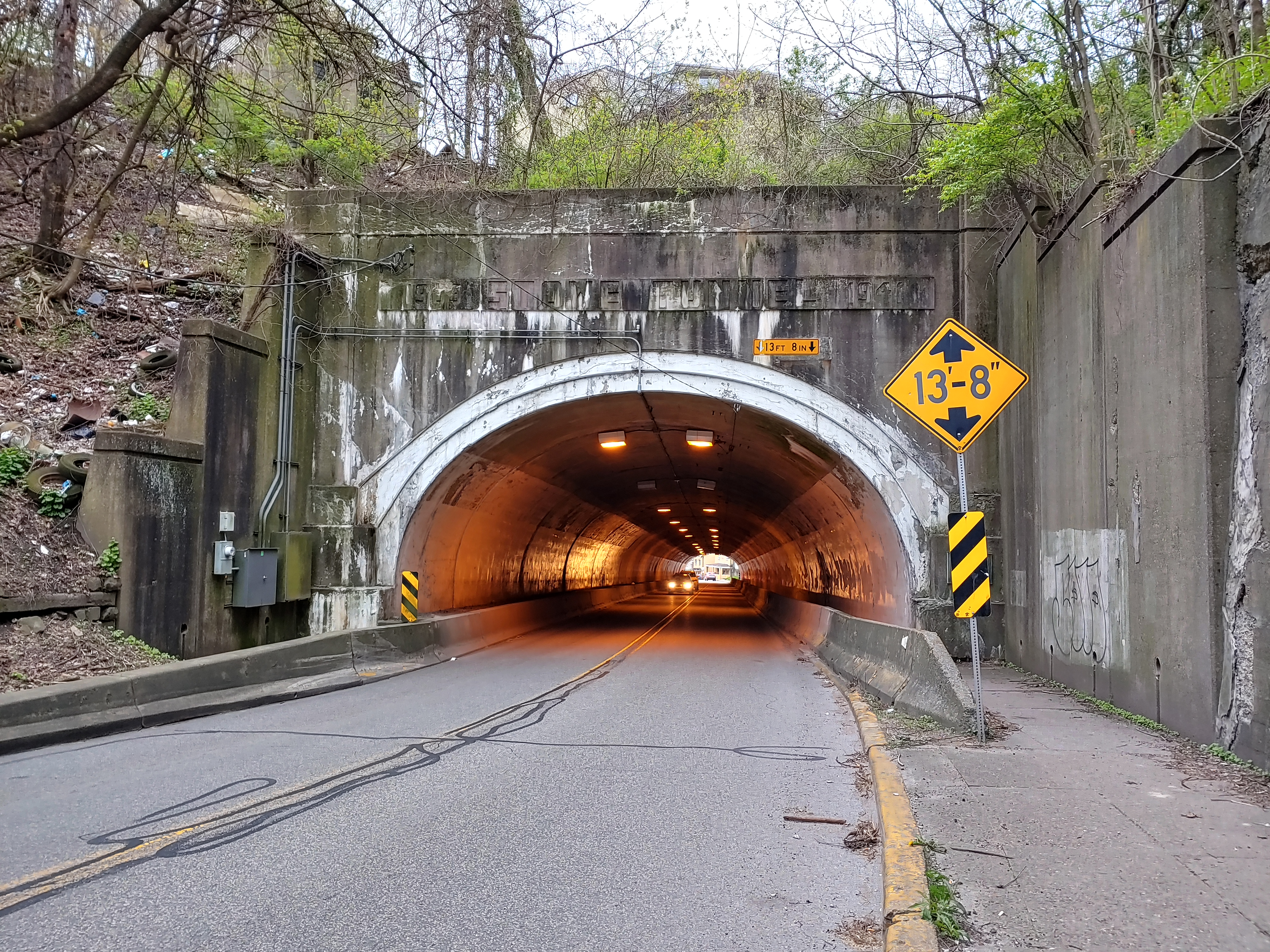
- North portal
- Interactive map of Stowe Tunnel

Overview
- Location: Stowe Township, Pennsylvania
- Coordinates: 40.4741°N 80.0718°W (south portal); (north portal)

Operation
- Opened: 1909
- Owner: PennDOT

Technical
- Length: 495 feet (estimated)
- No. of lanes: 2
- Tunnel clearance: 13ft 8in southbound; 11ft 11in northbound

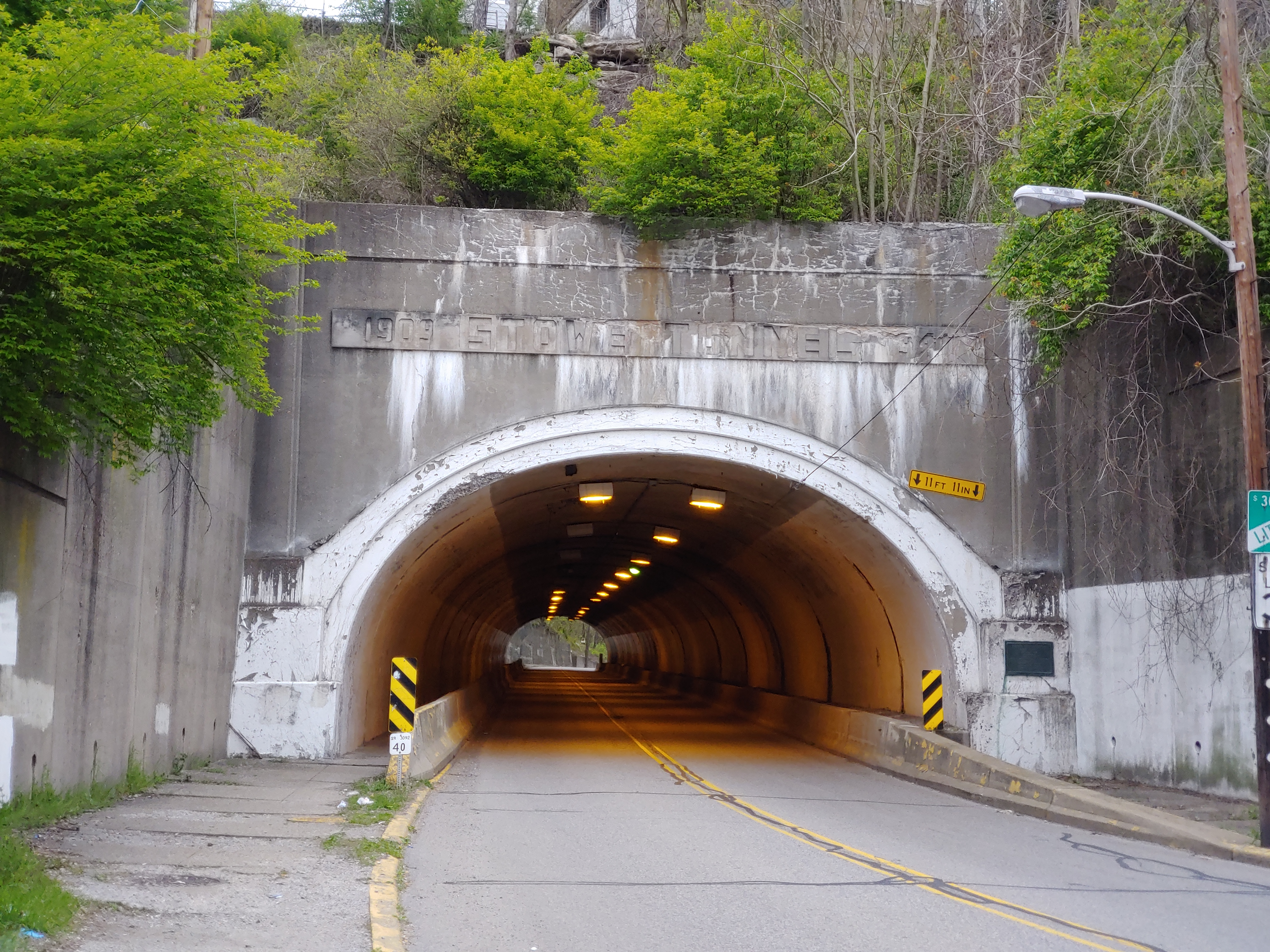
South portal

The Stowe Tunnel is a road tunnel in Stowe Township, Pennsylvania.

== History ==
The Stowe Tunnel was built in 1909 and was significantly renovated in 1940 and 2021.

The tunnel has been plagued with issues since its construction, in 1929 the tunnel was closed to vehicles due to deteriorating conditions. The tunnel continued to be used for pedestrian traffic especially to Stowe Township High School. When the tunnel was closed to pedestrian traffic students tore down the barricades. The tunnel was successfully closed in 1938 with a student strike ensuing. The effort to return the tunnel to service began in 1940. A partial tunnel collapse in Nov. 7, 1940 claimed the lives of five people, Haywood Turner, Charles Rosborough, Harper Fair, George Russell, and John Wright.
