= Robert S. Barnett =

American politician (1950–2004)

Robert Barnett

Pennsylvania Secretary of Labor and Industry
- In office March 9, 1994 – January 17, 1995
- Governor: Bob Casey
- Preceded by: Tom Foley
- Succeeded by: Johnny Butler

Pennsylvania Secretary of the Office of Administration
- In office January 21, 2003 – August 26, 2004
- Governor: Ed Rendell
- Preceded by: Fritz Bittenbender
- Succeeded by: Michael Masch

Personal details
- Born: July 19, 1950 Philadelphia, Pennsylvania, U.S.
- Died: November 26, 2004 (aged 54) Philadelphia, Pennsylvania, U.S.
- Party: Democratic
- Education: Penn State University; University of Virginia School of Law

Robert S. Barnett (July 19, 1950 – November 26, 2004) was an American politician aide who was Secretary of the Pennsylvania Office of Administration, a position he held from 2003 to 2004. He died from cancer on November 26, 2004, at the age of 54.

Political offices
Preceded by Tom Foley	Pennsylvania Secretary of Labor and Industry; 1994–1995	Succeeded by Johnny Butler
Preceded by Fritz Bittenbender	Pennsylvania Secretary of the Office of Administration; 2003–2004	Succeeded by Michael Masch
