= West Park, Stowe Township =

Coordinates: 40.47401°N 80.07751°W

West Park is a residential and commercial neighborhood located in Stowe Township, Pennsylvania, United States, and partially in the borough of McKees Rocks. The main business district of Stowe Township, Broadway, is located in the heart of West Park.

== Revitalization ==
Starting in 1983, West Park's Yesteryear Shopping District on Broadway underwent a revitalization plan which included a facelift of the buildings, the addition of many new businesses, and a dedication ceremony, among other things.

Stowe Township has recently partnered with the Allegheny Together organization to bring another revitalization effort to the Yesteryear Shopping District.

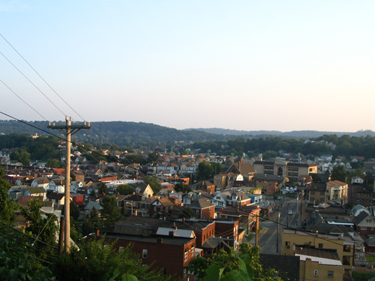
A small part of the West Park neighborhood in Stowe Township. Sto-Rox High School is visible.
