= Myron Brown =

American basketball player (born 1969)

Personal information
- Born: November 3, 1969 (age 57) McKees Rocks, Pennsylvania, U.S.
- Listed height: 6 ft 3 in (1.91 m)
- Listed weight: 180 lb (82 kg)

Career information
- High school: Sto-Rox (Stowe, Pennsylvania)
- College: Slippery Rock (1987–1991)
- NBA draft: 1991: 2nd round, 34th overall pick
- Drafted by: Minnesota Timberwolves
- Playing career: 1991–2006
- Position: Shooting guard
- Number: 34

Career history
- 1991: Minnesota Timberwolves
- 1991–1992: Fort Wayne Fury
- 1992: Philadelphia Spirit
- 1992–1993: La Crosse Catbirds
- 1993–1994: Fort Wayne Fury
- 1994–1995: Hartford Hellcats
- 1995: Sioux Falls Skyforce
- 1995–1997: Fort Wayne Fury
- 1997: Portland Wave
- 1997–1998: Mash J. Verona
- 1998–1999: Scavolini Pesaro
- 1999–2000: Basket Livorno
- 2000–2001: Progresso Castelmaggiore
- 2001–2002: SICC BPA Jesi
- 2002–2003: Trotamundos de Carabobo
- 2004–2005: Unitri Uberlândia
- 2005–2006: Detroit Wheels

Career highlights
- Italian All Star Game (1998); First-team Division II All-American (1991); 3× First-team All-PSAC (1989–1991)
- Stats at NBA.com
- Stats at Basketball Reference

Julian Myron Brown (born November 3, 1969) is an American former professional basketball player. At 6 ft 3 in (1.91 m), 180 pounds (82 kg) shooting guard, he played one season in the National Basketball Association (NBA) before playing around the world.

== College career ==
During his high school career with Sto-Rox, he was overlooked by most of the major colleges and universities in the Tri-State area. Brown went on to become a four-year starter (1987–91) for Slippery Rock. He was a four times All-American and finished his college career as Slippery Rock's all-time leading scorer.

== Professional career ==
Brown was selected by the Minnesota Timberwolves in the 2nd round (34th pick overall) of the 1991 NBA draft. He played in the NBA with the Timberwolves for only one season (1991/92), appearing in 4 games. He was featured in the dunk of the week section of NBA Inside Stuff.

Brown was picked up by the CBA's Fort Wayne Fury when he was released by the Minnesota Timberwolves after the season. During Brown's stint with the Fury (1991–1997) he won two dunk contests in 1991–92 and 1993–94, the first player in CBA history to win twice. He also made an appearance in the 96/97 CBA All-Star game, scoring 10 points on his first All-Star appearance.

== Career statistics ==
=== NBA ===
==== Regular season ====
Legend
| GP | Games played | GS | Games started | MPG | Minutes per game |
| FG% | Field goal percentage | 3P% | 3-point field goal percentage | FT% | Free throw percentage |
| RPG | Rebounds per game | APG | Assists per game | SPG | Steals per game |
| BPG | Blocks per game | PPG | Points per game | **Bold** | Career high |

| Year | Team | GP | GS | MPG | FG% | 3P% | FT% | RPG | APG | SPG | BPG | PPG |
|---|---|---|---|---|---|---|---|---|---|---|---|---|
| 1991–92 | Minnesota | 4 | 0 | 5.8 | .667 | .333 | – | .8 | 1.5 | .3 | .0 | 2.3 |
