= Cercone =

Cercone is an Italian surname.

Notable people with this surname include:

- David Cercone (born 1952), American judge
- Ettore Cercone, Italian painter
- Janus Cercone, American screenwriter
- Matt Cercone (1975–2009), American football player
- William F. Cercone (1913–2005), American prosecutor and judge
