= Jennifer Lee =

Jennifer, Jenny, or Jennie Lee may refer to:

== People ==
- Jennie Lee (American actress) (1848–1925), American stage and silent film actress
- Jennie Lee (British actress) (1854–1930), British stage actress
- Jennie Lee, Baroness Lee of Asheridge (1904–1988), British politician and life peer
- Jennie Lee (dancer) (1928–1990), American stripper, burlesque entertainer and actress
- Jennifer Lee (equestrian) (born 1965), Hong Kong equestrian
- Jennifer Lee (filmmaker) (born 1971), Walt Disney animation screenwriter and co-director
- Jennifer Lee (scientist), Antarctic researcher and scientist
- Jenny Lee (venture capitalist) (born 1972), Singaporean venture capitalist
- Jennifer Lee, Filipino singer and member of VIVA HotBabes
- Jennifer Nicole Lee (born 1975), American model and actress
- Jennifer 8. Lee (born 1976), American journalist and author
- Jennifer Lee (sociologist)

== Other uses ==
- "Jennie Lee" (song) by Jan and Arnie
- Jenny Lee Bakery, a Pittsburgh-based bakery
- Tokimonsta (real name Jennifer Lee), American electronic musician and producer

== See also ==
- Jennifer Worth (1935–2011), née Lee, British nurse and author, depicted as "Jenny Lee" in TV series Call the Midwife
- Jenny Lee-Wright (born 1947), British actress
- Jenny Lee Smith (born 1948), English golfer
- Jennifer Jason Leigh (born 1962), American actress
- Jennifer Leigh (born 1983), American poker player
- Jennifer Leigh Warren, American actress
- Jennie Lena (born 1977), Dutch singer
- Jen Lee (disambiguation)
