= Naomi Wyatt =

Secretary of the Pennsylvania Office of Administration
- In office 2007–2010
- Appointed by: Ed Rendell

Personal details
- Education: Yale University; University of Colorado School of Law
- Occupation: Attorney

Naomi Wyatt is a former Secretary of the Pennsylvania Office of Administration, who served in that role from 2007 to 2010.

She is the chief of staff for the School District of Philadelphia superintendent William R. Hite, Jr.

== Formative years ==
Wyatt received her Bachelor of Arts degree from Yale University, and then worked for Teach for America from 1995 to 1997 before returning to school to earn her Juris Doctor from the University of Colorado Law School.

She then became a litigation attorney, and practiced law in San Francisco, California and Philadelphia, Pennsylvania.

== Public service career ==
Employed by the Commonwealth of Pennsylvania, beginning in January 2006, Wyatt was subsequently appointed as the deputy secretary for Human Resources & Management and executive director of the Governor’s Office of Management and Productivity by Pennsylvania Governor Ed Rendell.

She was then appointed by Rendell as secretary of administration for the Pennsylvania Office of Administration on August 2, 2007. As a member of Rendell’s cabinet, she headed a state agency that employed six hundred staff who were engaged in facilitating continuity of state government operations by providing human resources, information technology, records management, and travel services to more than eighty thousand other state government personnel who worked for more than two dozen other state agencies with combined operating budgets that exceeded $4.6 billion. During her tenure, she oversaw a system-wide consolidation of information technology services and significant progress toward the completion of the state's 800-megahertz public safety radio system.

She also served on the board of directors of the Ben Franklin Technology Development Authority and the board of trustees of the Pennsylvania Employee Benefits Trust Fund.

From July 2013 to July 2015, she served as the chief talent officer for the School District of Philadelphia. From July 2015 through September 2020, she served as the chief of staff to the superintendent of the School District of Philadelphia.

An adjunct faculty member at the Fels Institute of Government at the University of Pennsylvania since 2015, Wyatt was hired as chief of operations for The Welcome Party, a Denver, Colorado-based Democratic political action committee, in October 2021.
