= Brad Johns (hair colorist) =

American hair colorist (1955–2026)

- Born: Bradley Salvatore Johns; October 27, 1955; McKees Rocks, Pennsylvania, U.S.
- Died: August 27, 2026 (aged 70); West Hollywood, California, U.S.
- Occupation: Hair colorist
- Partner: Donovan Blyden

Bradley Salvatore Johns (October 27, 1955 – August 27, 2026) was an American hair colorist.

== Early life and career ==
Johns was born in McKees Rocks, Pennsylvania on October 27, 1955, the son of Philip Carlton Johns, a jazz trumpeter, and Thelma Rose Ciccone. He moved to New York in the 1970s, and originally wanted to attend the Stella Adler Studio of Acting, but dropped out. After giving up acting, he attended the Robert Fiance Hair Design Institute. In 1977, he worked at Cinandre, a hairdressing salon at 57th Street in Manhattan, New York.

As a hair colorist, Johns created fashion publicist Carolyn Bessette Kennedy's "signature blonde hair". He also colored hairs for Johnny Depp, Christy Turlington, Lucille Ball, Kate Moss, Vanessa Redgrave, Matthew Modine, Natasha Richardson and Cindy Sherman. Aside from hair coloring, he was a silversmith. He moved to West Hollywood, California in 2019.

In 2023, Johns wrote his memoir Dye: A Memoir of Art, Music, Faith, Family and Hair Color.

== Personal life and death ==
Johns lived in West Hollywood, California with his partner Donovan Blyden. Their relationship lasted until Johns's death in 2026.

Johns died from complications of prostate cancer at his home in West Hollywood, on August 27, 2026, at the age of 70.
