= Duffy's Rocks =

Young adult novel by Edward Fenton

- First edition
- Author: Edward Fenton
- Language: English
- Publisher: E. P. Dutton (US); Hamish Hamilton (uk)
- Publication date: 1974
- Publication place: USA
- Media type: Print (Hardback)
- Pages: 198
- OCLC: 700820

Duffy's Rocks is a 1974 young adult novel by the American writer Edward Fenton (1917–1995) set in Pittsburgh, Pennsylvania, during the Great Depression.

It tells the story of fourteen-year-old Timothy Francis Brennan as he comes of age in the fictional mill town of Duffy's Rocks, adjacent to Pittsburgh, and a parallel of McKees Rocks, Pennsylvania. Brennan lives with his grandmother, a feisty Irish immigrant, as he searches for his missing father.

The book was reissued in 1999 by the University of Pittsburgh Press, in its Golden Triangle line of children's books.
