= Tom Foley (Pennsylvania politician) =

American politician

Pennsylvania Secretary of Labor and Industry
- In office May 16, 1991 – February 11, 1994
- Governor: Bob Casey
- Preceded by: Harris Wofford
- Succeeded by: Robert Barnett

Personal details
- Born: December 31, 1953 (age 72) Philadelphia, Pennsylvania, U.S.
- Party: Democratic
- Spouse: Michele
- Children: 3
- Education: Dartmouth College (BA); Yale University (JD)

Thomas Patrick Foley (born December 31, 1953) has served as a Belfast peace and justice advocate, state and federal government official, political candidate, state NGO chief executive, and college president. He currently serves as president of the Association of Independent Colleges and Universities in Pennsylvania.

Previously, he served as president of Mount Aloysius College, president of the United Way of Pennsylvania and CEO of the Red Cross of Southeastern Pennsylvania. He was the Pennsylvania Secretary of Labor and Industry under Gov. Robert P. Casey, and served as a White House appointee in the Clinton administration Department of Labor. Prior to that he worked on Capitol Hill, in the US Senate as chief speech writer and legislative aide on Irish issues for Sen. Joseph R. Biden, in the US House as a legislative aide to Rep. James Shannon.

== Early life and education ==
Foley grew up in Ambler and Flourtown, Pennsylvania, one of 12 children of Jack and Angela Foley. His grandparents emigrated from Ireland and settled in Philadelphia. He attended St. Genevieve's parish grade school and Bishop McDevitt High School. He received scholarships to Dartmouth College (BA, Summa Cum Laude) and to Yale Law School (JD), where he was an editor of Yale's international law journal. He also studied at University College Dublin as a post-graduate fellow and later completed non-degree programs in executive leadership at the Kennedy School of Government, Harvard Business School, and Harvard Graduate School of Education. Foley is the recipient of four honorary degrees.

== Northern Ireland Peace and Justice Advocate ==
Foley spent his year on a graduate fellowship at University College Dublin studying American-Irish diplomatic history. He spent part of that time in 1975–76 with Voluntary Service Belfast (VSB), working to reclaim bombed-out buildings and organizing cross-community youth activities. He later took a two-year leave from Yale Law School in 1979–81 to serve as a full-time volunteer with the Nobel Prize-winning organization Peace People in Belfast. He later worked with two US Speakers of the House, Tip O'Neill and Tom Foley (no relation), and for Senator Joe Biden on Irish issues in Washington. He hosted Irish Nobel Peace Prize winners Mairead Corrigan Maguire and John Hume on visits to the US, and has spoken and written often on the situation in Northern Ireland.

Foley's two years as a fulltime volunteer in Belfast occurred during the height of the Troubles and the hunger strikes of that period. He organized integrated youth programs, served as counsel to Mairead Corrigan-Maguire, and was the first American elected to its board, serving as Executive Member for Justice Issues. In that role, Foley authored the Peace People's proposals to resolve the Hunger Strikes at the Long Kesh prison and other Parliamentary submissions. With Corrigan-Maguire, he presented those proposals to top officials in the British, Irish and US Governments, as well as to leaders in Provisional Sinn Féin and in community and paramilitary groups across Northern Ireland.

His monograph Rights and Responsibilities: A Young Person's Guide to the Law and Emergency Legislation in Northern Ireland was adopted and reprinted by national youth organizations in Northern Ireland as their primary educational tool about the emergency laws. His 1982 article Public Security and Individual Freedom: The Dilemma of Northern Ireland discussed the line between private liberty and public safety (Yale Journal of International Law) in the context of Northern Ireland and implications elsewhere. Foley was also a prime mover in the creation of the non-partisan Committee on the Administration of Justice (CAJ), which later won the Reebok Human Rights Prize and the Council of Europe Human Rights Prize. He and civil rights lawyer Tom Hadden served as co-chairs of CAJ's first public assembly, and he was the author and editor of several of its initial publications.

Foley organized the first cross-community boys and girls youth soccer and basketball programs in Northern Ireland during the Troubles—putting hundreds of children into communities whose lines they had never before crossed. He also worked closely with leaders of the Corrymeela Community, a peace and reconciliation group dedicated to bringing all sides of the political conflict to the table.

In 1982, after Foley and Corrigan-Maguire met in Washington with the Friends of Ireland, a bi-partisan group in the US Congress committed to peace in Northern Ireland, Speaker Tip O'Neill arranged for him to join the staff of Congressman James Shannon. Two years later, Foley joined Senator Joe Biden's team as chief speechwriter and legislative aide for Irish issues. During that time, Senator Biden led the debate over the US/UK Extradition Treaty, and played a lead role (with Speaker O'Neill, and Senators Kennedy and Dodd) in the creation of the International Fund for Ireland, the first US economic development fund for Northern Ireland.

Over the next 30 years, Foley has continued to write and lecture on issues around peace, justice, and economic development in Northern Ireland. He has received numerous recognitions for his commitment to Ireland, including being named one of the top 100 Irish Americans in both law and education. In 2022, Foley was appointed Alternate Observer to the International Fund for Ireland (IFI) by Ambassador Samantha Power, in her role as Director of US AID. The fund monitors over $500M in contributions from six member nations.

== Pennsylvania Secretary of Labor & Industry ==
Foley was named Acting Secretary of Labor & Industry by Governor Robert P. Casey to succeed Harris Wofford upon Wofford's appointment to the United States Senate, becoming the youngest person to ever hold that post. Foley had previously served as a special assistant to the Governor and as the Executive Deputy Secretary at Labor & Industry. He was named Acting Secretary on May 16, 1991, and unanimously confirmed by the State Senate and sworn in as Secretary on July 11, 1991.

As Secretary of Labor & Industry, he oversaw the department's $3 billion budget, 6,000 person workforce and its broad mandate spanning labor law, unemployment and workers' compensation insurance, occupational and industrial safety, labor-management meditation and workforce development. Major initiatives during his tenure included modernizing the State Workers' Insurance Fund (SWIF), mediating labor management conflicts, preserving the solvency of State Unemployment Compensation Trust Fund (UCTF), creating the Joint Jobs Initiative the Rapid Response Initiative, and public service programs including PennSERVE and the Youth Service Corps. He also helped transform the state's unemployment offices into one-stop Job Centers, an innovation recognized by Harvard's Kennedy School as a national model for government service delivery and workforce development.

== US Department of Labor Regional Representative ==
In 1996, Foley was appointed by President Bill Clinton as Regional Representative of the Secretary of Labor for a six-state region. He served under Secretaries Robert Reich and Alexis Herman as a key liaison with governors, mayors, congressional offices, labor and business leaders, and with community. During his tenure, he led efforts on lifelong learning, service learning and workplace safety, earning the Secretary's Award for Exemplary Public Service. He was also a lead organizer of the USDOL-sponsored "National Summit on 21st Skills for 21st Century Jobs.

== CEO Humanitarian NGOs ==
=== President United Way of Pennsylvania ===
As President of the United Way of Pennsylvania from 1999 to 2004, Foley led the efforts of the state's 89 local United Ways, promoting their efforts on public policy, philanthropy, and preschool education as well as overseeing the multi-million dollar Pennsylvania State Employee's workplace-based charity campaign. He created and published the organization's first report on the State of Caring in Pennsylvania, and conceived and chaired the first annual State of Caring in Pennsylvania Conference, focusing on best practices for government officials and social agencies.

Foley also led United Way initiatives on 2-1-1 and early childhood education, and was a leader in the campaign that achieved annual funding for early childhood education from the Commonwealth of Pennsylvania.

=== CEO Red Cross of Southeastern Pennsylvania ===
From 2004 to 2010, Foley served as CEO of the American Red Cross-Southeastern Pennsylvania, the second largest American Red Cross chapter in the country. During his tenure the chapter doubled its volunteer base to over 12,000 volunteers while responding to regional disasters as well as to national (Hurricane Katrina) and international (2004 Indian Ocean tsunami and the 2010 earthquake in Haiti) crises. He oversaw the chapter's social services operations and fundraising campaigns, while revamping the group's media strategy with campaigns that won successive advertising industry awards.

Foley was named "Innovator of the Year" by Voluntary Organizations Active in Disaster (VOAD) for creating the "Preparedness Summit" model, which trained community leaders and social service groups on disaster preparedness. He led the campaign to fund the one-of-a-kind Red Cross House, a 26-unit facility for disaster victims presently located in West Philadelphia, and led the statewide coalition of the more than 30 Red Cross chapters.

Under Foley, the Southeastern Pennsylvania chapter led the nation with over 350 volunteers in front-line service in Mississippi and Louisiana, and raised $41 million for Katrina relief. Foley served as a front-line volunteer in both Mississippi and New Orleans and in Haiti after the 2010 earthquake.

== Higher Education ==
=== President Mount Aloysius College ===
From 2010 to 2018, Foley served as president of Mount Aloysius College, a comprehensive liberal arts and sciences institution with a strong commitment to career-directed study founded by Irish-based Sisters of Mercy.

As President, he expanded the college's community outreach efforts including community partnerships, service-learning activities, service-related internships, and service trips, and led the effort within the college's athletic conference to promote community service by student-athletes—now a major conference-wide and website focus. For these efforts, the college was named to the President's Higher Education Community Service Honor Roll six times.

As President, Foley led fundraising for and completion of five major construction projects: the campus convocation center the technology commons, the health studies center, the outdoor athletic complex and the "Digital Grotto" media production center.

The college's work on behalf of lower-income students led the White House in 2015 to name Mount Aloysius one of four model higher education Engines of Opportunity in the country. Foley established nationally recognized, yearlong, campus-wide explorations on values-focused themes like The Common Good, Civil Discourse, and The Good Life, which included a speaker series, curricular offerings, orientation activities, and publications which were shared with the wider education community, and two of which were added to the permanent collection of the Library of Congress.

Foley and his wife Michele were awarded honorary doctorates by the board of trustees for their service to the college and community.

=== President Association of Independent Colleges and Universities of Pennsylvania (AICUP) ===
In 2018, after eight years as president of Mount Aloysius College, Foley was named president of the Association of Independent Colleges and Universities in Pennsylvania (AICUP), composed of the presidents of over 90 colleges and universities. In this role, he represents independent, non-profit schools in the public arena in both Pennsylvania and Washington, DC; oversees a network of 40 collaborative programs between schools; and leads research efforts on higher education issues. Prior to becoming its president, Foley served as chair of the AICUP board.

AICUP initiatives under his leadership include new collaborative programs that promote innovation and efficiency, research at the intersection of education, the pandemic and public policy, an enhanced communications hub for its members, and publication of the influential report, The Economic Impact of AICUP Schools in Pennsylvania.

In 2018, Foley successfully advocated for the largest increase for low-income students in the history of Pennsylvania's higher education aid program (PHEAA). He led the AICUP institutions' response to COVID-19, with on-going updates to college presidents, dozens of webinars on pandemic-specific topics, and serving as the only higher education representative on the Governor's COVID education reopening committee (PA Path Forward).

== Candidate for Political Office ==
Foley ran for statewide office three times between 1994 and 2000. He won an eight-way Democratic primary for Lt Governor in 1994, but lost in the general election to a ticket led by Governor Tom Ridge. He was the endorsed candidate for Auditor General and lost by less than 1% to the son of former Governor Robert P. Casey in a four-way race. In 2000, he lost the Democratic primary in a bid to unseat U.S. Senator Rick Santorum.

== Public Policy Interests ==
Among public policy issues, three have been central to Foley's career: volunteerism, workforce development, and education. His interest in volunteerism was highlighted by his own two-year, full-time volunteer experience in Northern Ireland during its Troubles. He continued this interest by working with Harris Wofford and others in developing and later chairing PennSERVE, which became a model for AmeriCorps. He later served as CEO of the two largest volunteer organizations in Pennsylvania, the United Way of Pennsylvania and the Red Cross of Southeastern Pennsylvania.

His interest in workforce development began with his work as Pennsylvania's Secretary of Labor & Industry and in the US Labor Department on job training and lifelong learning, and continued through his work as an advocate for job-readiness in higher education.

Foley's interest in early education began during his time as head of the United Way of Pennsylvania, advocating for its adoption and promoting the first public investment in pre-school education by the Pennsylvania state government, and continues today with his role as co-chair of The Governor's Early Learning Investment Commission.

== Personal ==
Foley is married to Michele McDonald Foley, a lifelong educator. They have three sons.

== Selected publications ==
"Sidestepping Car Bombs: Welcome to the Pursuit of Justice in Northern Ireland," Just News (40th Anniversary Edition), Quarterly Magazine of the Committee on the Administration of Justice. February 2022.

"Finding a Way for Hope and History to Rhyme," Johnstown Tribune Democrat, June 10, 2020.

"The Role of Private Higher Education in Workforce Development," Association of Independent Colleges and Annual Meeting, Harrisburg, PA, April 3, 2017.

"Invest in the Bookends of Education," Pittsburgh Post-Gazette, January 1, 2017.

"The Good Life," editor, Mount Aloysius College Press, Cresson, PA, 2016. (permanent collection, Library of Congress).

"Campus Violence and the Role of Civil Discourse," Johnstown Tribune-Democrat, December 1, 2015.

"Veteran's Day Remembrance: Of Soldiers and Dreamers," Vital Speeches of the Day, Vol. 1, January 2015.

"Box Scores and College Ratings," Inside Higher Ed, April 8, 2014.

"The Common Good: 21st Century Citizenship," editor, Mount Aloysius College Press, Cresson, PA, 2014.

"After the Boston Bombings, Look for the Helpers," Allentown Morning Call, 21 April 2013.

"The Role of the University in Civil Discourse," editor, Mount Aloysius College Press, Cresson, PA, 2012. (permanent collection, Library of Congress.)

"Nation Faces Critical Test in Katrina," Harrisburg Patriot News, 23 October 2005.

"Hope and History: With Today's Vote, the Irish Can Write New Chapter for Ireland," Philadelphia Inquirer, 22 May 1998.

"The 150th Chicken Dinner Tasted Worse than Defeat," Philadelphia Inquirer, 28 November 1994.

"Job Training and Service Go Hand in Hand," Pittsburgh Post-Gazette, 3 March 1993.

"The Changing Workforce," Workforce, Vol. II, No. 22, Spring, 1993.

With Robert Coy, "Advancing Labor-Management Cooperation in Pennsylvania," Labor Notes (publication of National Governors Association), 29 August 1988.

"Public Security and Individual Freedom: The Dilemma of Northern Ireland," Yale Journal of World Public Order, Spring 1982 (reprinted in Congressional Record, July 17, 1986).

With Marcus D. Pohlmann, Ph.D., "Terrorism in the 70's: Media's Connection" National Forum, Summer 1981.

"Beating Terrorists?" [Book Review], Fortnight, (179), 19–20. December 1980.

"Rights and Responsibilities: A Young Person's Guide to the Law and Emergency Legislation in Northern Ireland" (Belfast: Northern Ireland Youth Service), April 1980, special supplement.

With Ciaran McKeown, "Time for a Change: The Case for a Return to Normal Judicial Process," Parliamentary Submission (Belfast: Peace People, Ltd.), 1980.

Political offices
Preceded by Harris Wofford	Pennsylvania Secretary of Labor and Industry; 1991–1994	Succeeded by Robert Barnett
Party political offices
Preceded by Mark Singel	Democratic nominee for Lieutenant Governor of Pennsylvania; 1994	Succeeded by Marjorie Margolies-Mezvinsky
