= Island Heights, Stowe Township =

Suburb in Pennsylvania, USA

Island Heights
- Neighborhood
- Interactive map of Island Heights
- Coordinates: 40.488°N 80.085°W
- Country: United States
- State: Pennsylvania
- County: Allegheny County
- City: Stowe Township

Island Heights is a suburban neighborhood that is located in Stowe Township, Pennsylvania in the United States.

== History and geography ==
Most of this American neighborhood was built circa 1960. Its named was derived from its geographical location. It sits on a hill overlooking Neville Island and is home to the newly renovated Island Heights Park.

This small neighborhood was originally accessible from its own township via Fleming Park Road from Pennsylvania Route 51. The steep stretch of Fleming Park Road from Route 51 to the Sarah Street approach closed years ago; the only way to get to Island Heights is from Kennedy Township, Pennsylvania, by way of Ewing Road, then turning onto Fleming Park Road (which becomes Grace Street at the bend), then either staying straight on Grace or turning left on William Street towards the only other remaining open segment of Fleming Park Road.

Island Heights consists of twelve streets: William Street (at Island Heights Park), Charles Street, Speer Street, Euclid Avenue, Gordon Street, Fleming Park Road, Sarah Street, William Circle, Louis Drive, Louis Court, Homer Circle, and Bellmawr Drive.
