= Jen Lee =

Jen Lee may refer to:

- Jen Lee (cartoonist), cartoonist, illustrator, and author
- Jen Lee (sledge hockey), American sledge hockey player
- Jen Sookfong Lee, Chinese Canadian broadcaster and novelist

== See also ==
- Jennifer Lee (disambiguation)
