= Bob Ligashesky =

American football player and coach (born 1962)

Wisconsin Badgers
- Title: Special teams coordinator

Personal information
- Born: June 2, 1962 (age 64); McKees Rocks, Pennsylvania, U.S.

Career information
- High school: McKees Rocks (PA) Sto-Rox
- College: IUP

Career history
- Wake Forest (1985) Graduate assistant; Arizona State (1986–1988) Graduate assistant; Kent State (1989–1990) Outside linebackers coach & special teams coach; Bowling Green (1991–1998) Linebackers coach & special teams coach; Bowling Green (1999) Assistant head coach, linebackers coach, special teams coach; Pittsburgh (2000–2003) Tight ends coach & special teams coach; Jacksonville Jaguars (2004) Special teams coach; St. Louis Rams (2005–2006) Special teams coach; Pittsburgh Steelers (2007–2009) Special teams coach; Denver Broncos (2010) Tight ends coach; Oakland Raiders (2011) Special teams assistant; Tampa Bay Buccaneers (2012) Special teams coordinator; Houston Texans (2013–2015) Special teams coordinator; Illinois (2016–2017) Tight ends coach & special teams coordinator; Illinois (2018–2020) Special teams coordinator; Bowling Green (2021) Special teams coordinator; Syracuse (2022–2023) Special teams coordinator; Minnesota (2024–2025) Special teams coordinator; Wisconsin (2026–present) Special teams coordinator

Awards and highlights
- Super Bowl champion (XLIII)

Bob Ligashesky (born June 2, 1962) is an American football coach. He is currently the special teams coordinator at the University of Wisconsin–Madison. Ligashesky has been an assistant coach with several teams in the National Football League (NFL).

== Playing career ==
Ligashesky was a linebacker for the Sto-Rox High School Vikings. He was a three-year letter winner as a defensive back at the Indiana University of Pennsylvania (IUP). He graduated from IUP in 1985.

== Coaching career ==
Ligashesky has coached for the Jacksonville Jaguars (2004) and the St. Louis Rams (2005–2006) of the National Football League (NFL). Ligashesky was hired on January 29, 2007, as the Pittsburgh Steelers special teams coach after Kevin Spencer left to coach for the Arizona Cardinals. He was hired when Mike Tomlin became head coach after Bill Cowher resigned early in 2007. He was released by the Steelers on January 7, 2010.

Ligashesky coached for the Tampa Bay Buccaneers in 2012. The most notable incident of Ligasheky's tenure occurred in practice when Ligashesky, "walked onto the wrong area of the practice field during a drill" upon which head coach Greg Schiano, "launched into a loud tirade and threatened to fire him." Ligashesky was fired at the end of the season.

From 2013 to 2015, he worked as the special teams coordinator for the Houston Texans. He was released in January 2016 after a devastating loss to the Kansas City Chiefs in the AFC Wild-Card playoff game.

As a college football coach, Ligashesky has coached at the University of Pittsburgh, Bowling Green State University and Kent State University. Ligashesky was also a graduate assistant at Arizona State University and Wake Forest University.

On March 17, 2016, he was hired as the special teams coordinator and tight end coach at the University of Illinois Urbana–Champaign.

Following the staff's dismissal at Illinois, Ligashesky was hired by Scot Loeffler to be the special teams coordinator at Bowling Green in March 2021.

Ligashesky was hired as Syracuse's Special teams coordinator on December 9, 2021.
