= Hachmeister-Lind =

- Headquarters: Pittsburgh

Hachmeister-Lind was a Pittsburgh-based chemical maker and auto parts business, which applied mirror finishes to a portion of auto light bulbs. The treated light bulbs, called Perfect-o-Lite, cut down the glare of the lights and directed the beam over a wider area of the road. The company operated during the Great Depression in the 1930s. It had a physical address at 211 Wood Street and a mailing address at Dept. L-570, in Pittsburgh.

== Diverse inventory ==
The corporation also maintained a light and mastic tile division. A separate department manufactured different kinds of plasters used in wall finishes. Aside from floor coverings and lights, the company sold more than 600 chemicals. The most significant chemicals it made were used in the electroplating industry.

== Profitability ==
In the latter half of 1931 Hachmeister-Lind's earnings amounted to $30,000 per month, or, approximately $244,686 for the full year. This widely exceeded the firm's 1930 revenue, which totaled $133,247.

== Radio sponsor ==
Hachmeister-Lind sponsored episodes of The Shadow during January and February 1932.

== Bankruptcy ==
The company filed for bankruptcy in August 1934, in Federal District Court of the western district of Pennsylvania. Its address at the time was Island Avenue and Leonard Avenue in McKees Rocks, Pennsylvania.
