= William F. Cercone =

American judge

Senior Judge of the Superior Court of Pennsylvania
- In office 1983 – December 31, 2002

President Judge of the Superior Court of Pennsylvania
- In office January 2, 1979 – 1983

Judge of the Superior Court of Pennsylvania
- In office 1969 – January 2, 1979

Judge of the Allegheny County Court of Common Pleas
- In office 1956–1968
- Appointed by: George M. Leader

Personal details
- Born: August 13, 1913 Stowe Township, Pennsylvania
- Died: January 2, 2005 (aged 91) Cranberry Township, Butler County, Pennsylvania
- Education: University of Pittsburgh; Duquesne University School of Law

William F. Cercone (August 13, 1913 – January 2, 2005) was a prosecutor and judge in Pennsylvania. As a prosecutor, he rose to prominence during the Red Scare of the 1950s by prosecuting Communist Steve Nelson. He later served on the Superior Court of Pennsylvania.

Several of Cercone's relatives were also prominent lawyers or judges, notably his uncle, Pennsylvania Supreme Court justice Michael Musmanno, and his great-nephew, United States district court judge David S. Cercone.

== Early life ==
Cercone was born August 13, 1913, in Stowe Township, Pennsylvania. He received a Bachelor of Arts degree from the University of Pittsburgh in 1936 and a Bachelor of Laws degree from Duquesne University School of Law in 1941.

Cercone then joined the United States Navy and served on an amphibious assault ship in the Pacific Ocean theatre of World War II. He held the rank of lieutenant.

== Attorney ==
After World War II, Cercone served as assistant district attorney of Allegheny County, Pennsylvania. He became famous for prosecuting Steve Nelson, a prominent Communist in Pittsburgh, for sedition. After a six-month trial, Nelson was sentenced to twenty years in prison. Cercone received general acclaim for his role in the trial. However, historian Philip Jenkins has pointed to "a strong suggestion of conflict of interest" in the trial, as Cercone's uncle, Michael Musmanno, was the main investigator and witness in the trial (he testified for thirty days straight), and the judge in the trial had been appointed by Musmanno. In addition, Nelson had no lawyer for much of the trial. The Supreme Court of the United States eventually overturned the conviction, saying that the state law under which Nelson was prosecuted was preempted by federal law.

Cercone also served in a number of other public attorney positions: special deputy attorney general of Pennsylvania, special assistant to the United States Attorney General, and attorney for the United States Army Corps of Engineers in Pennsylvania and Ohio. In addition, he served on the Stowe Township school board from 1948 until 1954 and then as school district solicitor until 1956.

== Judge ==
In 1956, Pennsylvania governor George M. Leader appointed Cercone to the Allegheny County Court of Common Pleas. He was reelected in 1957 and 1967. Soon after his appointment, Cercone ordered a grand jury investigation into the sale of pornographic magazines, calling them "moral pollution"; this led to a tightening of state obscenity laws.

In 1968, Cercone was elected to the Superior Court of Pennsylvania. In 1979, he arranged for the American Judicature Society to study the Superior Court, which resulted in a report that the court was significantly overworked. The voters of Pennsylvania approved an amendment to the Pennsylvania Constitution increasing the size of the court by eight judges. Cercone left the court upon reaching the mandatory retirement age of 90.

He died of pneumonia on January 2, 2005.

== See also ==
- Pennsylvania v. Nelson
