= Catherine Baker Knoll =

American politician (1930–2008)

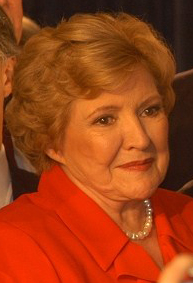

30th Lieutenant Governor of Pennsylvania
- In office January 21, 2003 – November 12, 2008
- Governor: Ed Rendell
- Preceded by: Robert Jubelirer
- Succeeded by: Joe Scarnati

72nd Treasurer of Pennsylvania
- In office January 18, 1989 – January 22, 1997
- Governor: Bob Casey Sr. Tom Ridge
- Preceded by: Davis Greene
- Succeeded by: Barbara Hafer

Personal details
- Born: Catherine Baker; September 3, 1930 McKees Rocks, Pennsylvania, U.S.
- Died: November 12, 2008 (aged 78) Washington, D.C., U.S.
- Resting place: Allegheny County Memorial Park; Allison Park, Pennsylvania, U.S.
- Party: Democratic
- Spouse: Charles A. Knoll
- Profession: Teacher, businesswoman, politician

Catherine Baker Knoll (September 3, 1930 – November 12, 2008) was an American politician and member of the Democratic Party. She was the 30th lieutenant governor of Pennsylvania, serving under Governor Ed Rendell from 2003 to 2008, when she died in office. Prior to that, she served as the 72nd Pennsylvania treasurer from 1989 to 1997. She was the first woman to be lieutenant governor of Pennsylvania.

== Background ==
Catherine Baker was born on September 3, 1930, in the Pittsburgh suburb of McKees Rocks, Pennsylvania, the daughter of Nick Baker, a successful man who later served as mayor of McKees Rocks and Teresa May (one of eleven children). She was one of nine children, one of five girls and four boys. While a graduate at Duquesne University in 1952, she met and married Charles A. Knoll, a restaurateur and hotel owner 17 years her senior, who became the Postmaster of the Stowe, Kennedy, and McKees Rocks area. Charles Knoll and Catherine had three sons and one daughter. Their names are Charles A. Knoll Jr., Mina Baker Knoll, Albert Baker Knoll, and Kim Eric Knoll.

Knoll began her political career as a campaign worker for local and statewide Democratic candidates, first for her father, Nick, and later for Governor Milton Shapp. When Shapp was elected governor in 1970, he awarded Knoll a job with the Pennsylvania Department of Transportation.

== State Treasurer ==
In 1976, she ran for the Democratic nomination for state treasurer but lost to Robert E. Casey, who was unrelated to, but often confused with Bob Casey who went on to become Governor of Pennsylvania. She ran again in 1984 but lost a close primary in which her opponent, Auditor General Al Benedict, originally conceded on election night but later withdrew his concession. In 1988, one year after her husband's death, she ran a third time and was elected state treasurer of Pennsylvania.

She streamlined and modernized the treasurer's office during her eight-year tenure and started the Pennsylvania TAP program (Tuition Account Program), built the PA Treasury Investment Center, and started a partnership with PA Home Builders, PA Community Banks, to build PA Affordable Housing in 67 counties of Pennsylvania) according to the population of each county.

In 1994, the U.S. Securities and Exchange Commission launched an investigation into Knoll and her staff after four state consultants reaped improper fees from a prison bond issue. Knoll claimed that the official paperwork had been altered after she signed off on the plan. Knoll was never charged with a crime but the well-publicized inquiry hurt her politically. However, the four state consultants were found guilty and served prison time.

Catherine Baker Knoll ran for the Democratic nomination for governor in 1994, having surprised Lieutenant Governor Mark Singel, by first withdrawing from the race and then hinting that she would consider running if the Democratic State Committee did not endorse anyone for the race. The State Committee voted to endorse no candidate and Knoll re-entered the race only to finish third in a seven-way primary.

In 1996, Knoll, who was term limited, endorsed her daughter Mina Baker Knoll as her successor. Mina Knoll's opponent, Republican Barbara Hafer questioned her residency status because she had lived in New York City and the Knoll campaign attacked Hafer's leadership as auditor general. The race, which Hafer won, opened a rift between the two women that culminated in 2000 when Knoll herself ran against Hafer for treasurer. The race featuring arguably the two highest-profile women in Pennsylvania politics, was noted for its bitterness between the two; Hafer cited a fraud scandal investigation by the SEC into Knoll's office while she was treasurer, and Knoll attacked Hafer for questionable expenses paid by the state. In the end, Hafer won the election by less than 100,000 votes.

== Lieutenant governor ==
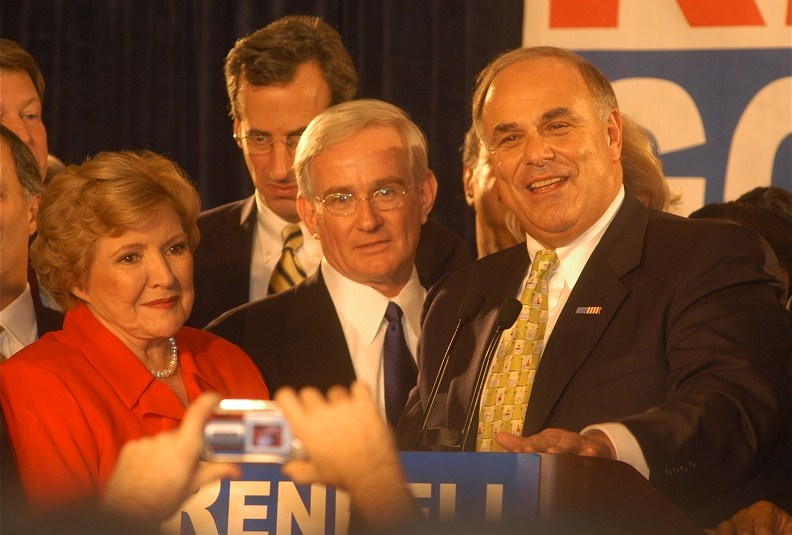
Knoll with Governor Rendell (right)

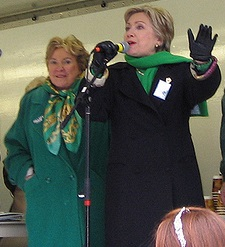
Knoll attends Pittsburgh's St. Patrick's Day Parade with Hillary Clinton

In 2002, Knoll sought the Democratic nomination for Lieutenant Governor of Pennsylvania. She faced nine candidates in the primary, including state Senators Allen Kukovich, John Lawless, Thaddeus Kirkland, and Jack Wagner, the latter of which was endorsed by the state party. Maintaining her base of support among women and senior citizens, Knoll won the primary with 25% of the vote, winning 54 of the state's 67 counties.

She was paired with Democratic nominee for governor Ed Rendell, who also defeated the establishment favorite in his primary (Bob Casey Jr.). Her campaign was memorable for her traveling from small town to small town (logging over 40,000 miles on her car), and her meeting thousands of voters, by visiting church basements, PTA meetings, fashion shows and construction sites. The Rendell/ Knoll ticket won the general election 53% to 44% over Republicans Mike Fisher and his running mate Jane Earll. Knoll was sworn in as Pennsylvania's first-ever female Lieutenant Governor on January 21, 2003.

Knoll's old rival Barbara Hafer, after failing to secure the Republican nomination for governor, actually endorsed Rendell and later switched to the Democratic party. This led to speculation that she was maneuvering to challenge Knoll for the lieutenant governor spot in the 2006 primary. Hafer, however, stated that she and Knoll had buried the hatchet long ago, and did not enter the race.

Congressman Joe Hoeffel announced that he would challenge Knoll in the primary, but dropped out of the race a day later, after Ed Rendell reiterated his support for Knoll as his running-mate. This left only token opposition against Knoll, and she won the Democratic nomination by a large margin. She and Governor Rendell defeated Republican challengers Lynn Swann and Jim Matthews to win reelection.

Knoll endorsed and campaigned with Hillary Clinton in the lead-up to the 2008 Pennsylvania Democratic primary for president. Along with several other prominent Pennsylvania Democrats, Knoll's endorsement was seen as a key to Clinton's win.

As lieutenant governor, she presided over every Pennsylvania Senate session. Governor Rendell noted that she was "instrumental in issues such as emergency management, domestic preparedness and economic development."

== Death ==
In August 2008, Knoll revealed that she had been diagnosed with neuroendocrine cancer and was in treatment for the disease. She was treated in Hershey, Pennsylvania at Penn State Hershey Medical Center and attempted a return to her duties in September 2008 but fatigue forced her to return home. In October 2008, she entered Johns Hopkins Hospital in Baltimore, Maryland for treatment of a viral infection. On November 12, 2008, Knoll died at MedStar National Rehabilitation Hospital in Washington, aged 78. Upon her death, Pennsylvania State Senate President pro tempore Joe Scarnati became the lieutenant governor of Pennsylvania.

== See also ==
- List of female lieutenant governors in the United States

Political offices
Preceded by Davis Greene	Treasurer of Pennsylvania; 1989–1997	Succeeded by Barbara Hafer
Preceded by Robert Jubelirer	Lieutenant Governor of Pennsylvania; 2003–2008	Succeeded by Joe Scarnati
Party political offices
Preceded by Al Benedict	Democratic nominee for Treasurer of Pennsylvania; 1988, 1992	Succeeded by Mina Baker Knoll
Preceded by Mina Baker Knoll	Democratic nominee for Treasurer of Pennsylvania; 2000	Succeeded by Bob Casey, Jr.
Preceded by Marjorie Margolies-Mezvinsky	Democratic nominee for Lieutenant Governor of Pennsylvania; 2002, 2006	Succeeded by Scott Conklin
