= Sto-Rox School District =

School district in Pennsylvania, USA

Coordinates: 40.47561°N 80.07017°W

Address
- 1105 Valley Street McKees Rocks, Allegheny County, Pennsylvania, 15136; United States

District information
- Type: Public
- Grades: K-12

Students and staff
- District mascot: Vikings
- Colors: Hunter green, White

Other information
- Website: http://www.srsd.k12.pa.us/

The Sto-Rox School District is a suburban, public school district in Allegheny County, Pennsylvania. The district encompasses the borough of McKees Rocks along with Stowe Township. Sto-Rox School District encompasses approximately 3 square miles (7.8 km^{2}). According to 2000 federal census data, it serves a resident population of 13,330 people. By 2010, the district's population declined to 12,468 people. In 2009, Sto-Rox School District residents' per capita income was $15,833, while the median family income was $33,343 a year. In the Commonwealth, the median family income was $49,501 and the United States median family income was $49,445, in 2010. By 2013, the median household income in the United States rose to $52,100.

As of 2006, the school districts' official colors changed from Kelly green and white to hunter green and white. The official mascot is the viking.

== Buildings ==
All elementary students of the Sto-Rox School District in grades K-3 attend Sto-Rox Primary Center in Kennedy Township. The school was built in 1997 and has an east and west wing. All middle school students in grades 4-6 attend Sto-Rox Upper Elementary in Kennedy Township. The state-of-the-art modern building was constructed in 2002. Both schools have convenient access to a nature trail which is located in the woods behind the buildings.

All secondary students (grades 7-12) attend Sto-Rox High School in Stowe Township. The building was built in 1926 as the Stowe Township High School, but became Sto-Rox High School in the 1967 when Stowe Township School District merged with the School District of the Borough of McKees Rocks, thus forming Sto-Rox.

== Extracurriculars ==
Sto-Rox School District offers a wide variety of clubs, activities and sports.

=== Sports ===
The district funds:

Boys

- Basketball- AA
- Baseball-AA
- Football - A

Girls

- Basketball - AA
- Softball-AA
- Volleyball - A
