= Philip J. Berg =

American conspiracy theorist

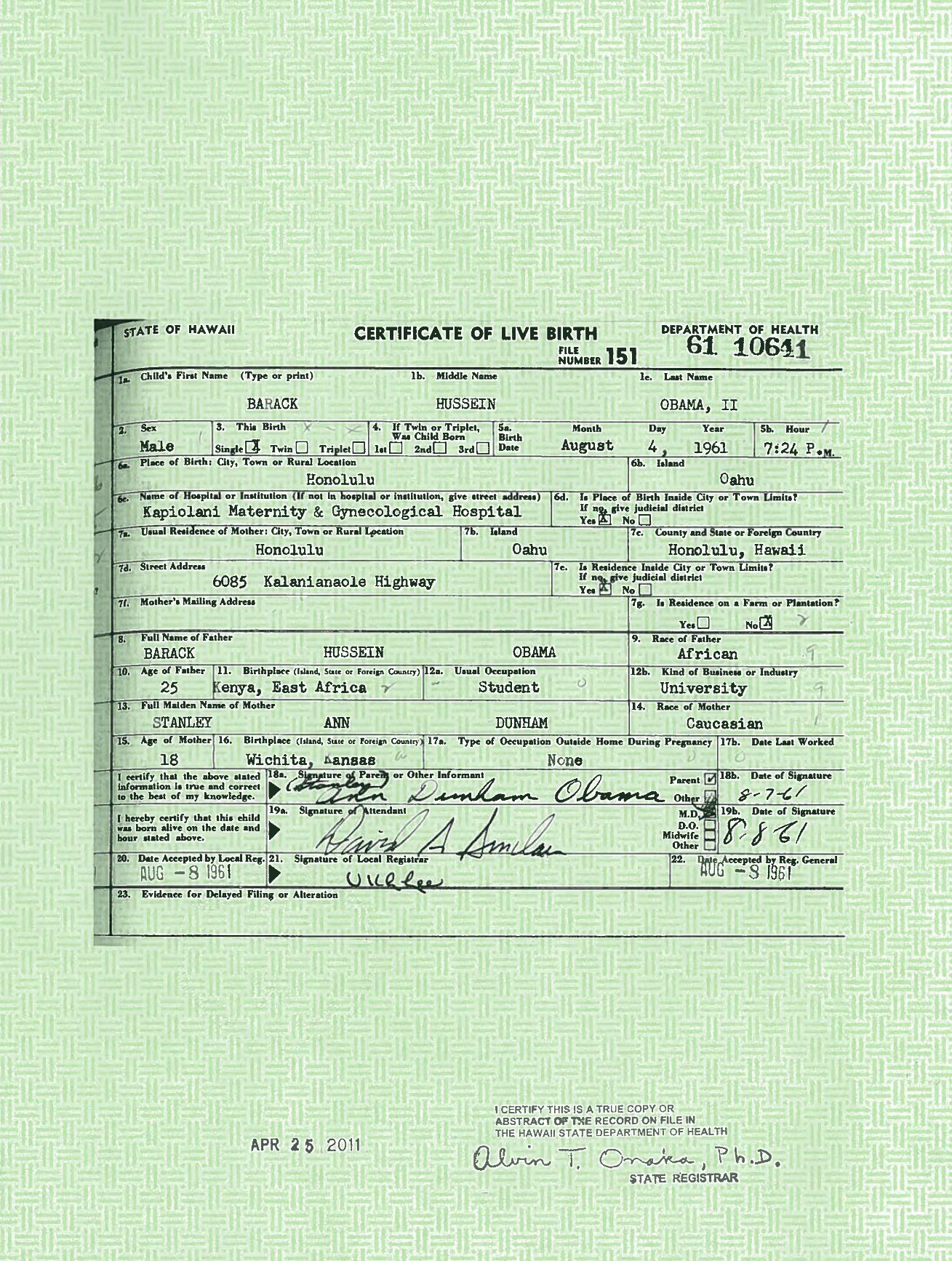
In response to the conspiracy theories, the White House released the President's long-form birth certificate on April 27, 2011, reaffirming that he was born at 7:24 pm on August 4, 1961, in Honolulu, Hawaii.

Philip Jay Berg (born April 13, 1944), previously an American attorney, brought a Racketeer Influenced and Corrupt Organizations Act (RICO) lawsuit charging president George W. Bush and 154 others with complicity in the September 11 attacks, and another suit challenging the eligibility of Barack Obama to become President of the United States.

Berg, whose office was in Lafayette Hill, Pennsylvania, is a former chairman of the Democratic Party of Montgomery County, in suburban Philadelphia and a former member of the Democratic State Committee. He is a paid life member of the NAACP.

He is a former deputy attorney general of Pennsylvania.

On June 19, 2013, Berg's license to practice law in the Commonwealth of Pennsylvania was suspended for two years. The Pennsylvania Supreme Court announced on June 16, 2015, that Berg was disbarred on consent after submitting a letter of resignation that the court kept under seal. After being disbarred, he worked as an Uber driver in Philadelphia.

== Activism ==
Berg has involved himself with several controversial political cases. In 2001 he demanded the disbarment of U.S. Supreme Court Justices Sandra Day O'Connor, Antonin Scalia, and Clarence Thomas due to their participation in the case Bush v. Gore. In 2004, Berg filed a Racketeer Influenced and Corrupt Organizations Act (RICO) lawsuit on behalf of a World Trade Center maintenance worker against President George W. Bush and others alleging that the Bush administration and certain government officials conspired to bring about the September 11 attacks on the World Trade Center. The federal district court dismissed the suit. He challenged President George W. Bush on his right to conduct a war against terror and another against Saddam Hussein without a congressional authorization.

== Malpractice and ethics violations ==
Berg was sued for legal malpractice by former clients on whose behalf Berg had neglected to file a response to a complaint in an ERISA lawsuit, resulting in a default judgment being entered against the former clients. Berg responded by bringing into the malpractice suit the plaintiffs in the ERISA action on a claim of fraud upon the court. The ERISA plaintiffs moved for summary judgment—which was granted after Berg failed to respond to the motion—and then moved for sanctions against Berg. Berg again failed to file a response.

On June 2, 2005, U.S. District Judge J. Curtis Joyner granted the motion for sanctions, finding that the fraud claim "was inadequately pled, not grounded in fact, time-barred, and utterly irrelevant to the pending malpractice action against him." Observing that an attorney's signature on a complaint constitutes, among other things, a certification that the signer has conducted a reasonable inquiry into the grounds for the claim asserted, the court further found that "even the most limited investigation would have revealed that [Berg] had no standing to raise such a claim." The court also found that Berg's claim was motivated by a "desire to harass" and "delay litigation." The court fined Berg $10,000 and ordered him to attend six hours of ethics training.

On June 19, 2013, the Supreme Court of Pennsylvania ordered Berg suspended for two years for neglecting the 2006 federal lawsuit, stating that he filed the lawsuit on the last day for filing and subsequently "did virtually nothing to prosecute his client's claim," resulting in the case being dismissed. Berg then failed to notify his client of the dismissal and "over the next two years . . . mostly ignored his client's requests for updates" while leading her "to believe that her case was still viable." As aggravating factors in supporting the suspension, it was noted that Berg failed to "express adequate remorse" or apologize to the client. Also noted was his extensive disciplinary history, including a private reprimand in 2005 for commingling funds, an informal admonition in 2006 for neglect of a matter that resulted in dismissal of a client's case and a private reprimand and one year probation imposed in 2008 for failing to pursue a workers' compensation matter.

In January 2014, Berg resigned from the bar of the Supreme Court of the United States after it had previously ordered him to explain why he should not be expelled. Berg stated his intention to reapply for membership once the Supreme Court of Pennsylvania restored his law license.

Berg was disbarred on consent from practicing law in Pennsylvania; the state Supreme Court announced on June 16, 2015, that he had submitted a letter of resignation that the court kept under seal. The court said that he had neglected to inform a client that a judge had dismissed her lawsuit. The court said his client went two years without learning of the dismissal.

== RICO lawsuit, Rodriguez v. Bush ==
In October 2004, Berg filed Rodriguez v. Bush, accusing the President of the United States and 155 other parties of complicity in the September 11 attacks.

This 237-page civil lawsuit included allegations pursuant to the RICO (Racketeer Influenced and Corrupt Organizations Act) against the United States, the Federal Emergency Management Agency, the Department of Homeland Security, George H. W. Bush, George W. Bush, Dick Cheney, Donald Rumsfeld, and numerous others, totaling 156 defendants in the U.S. District Court for the Eastern District of Pennsylvania.

This lawsuit made hundreds of allegations including allegations that the Twin Towers were destroyed by means of "controlled demolitions;" that members of the FDNY were ordered, on instructions of the CIA, not to talk about it; that the FDNY conspired with Larry Silverstein to deliberately destroy 7WTC; that projectiles were fired at the Twin Towers from "pods" affixed to the underside of the planes that struck them; that FEMA is working with the US government to create "American Gulag" concentration camps which FEMA will run once the federal government's plan to impose martial law is in place; that phone calls made by some of the victims, as reported by their family members, were not actually made but were "faked" by the government using "voice morphing" technology; that a missile, not American Airlines Flight 77, struck the Pentagon; that United Airlines Flight 93 was shot down by the U.S. military; that the defendants had foreknowledge of the attacks and actively conspired to bring them about; that the defendants engaged in kidnapping, arson, murder, treason, conspiracy, trafficking in narcotics, embezzlement, securities fraud, insider trading, identity and credit card theft, blackmail, trafficking in humans, and the abduction and sale of women and children for sex.

The matter was transferred to the Southern District of New York on May 2, 2005. On June 26, 2006, the court dismissed the claims against the US, DHS, and FEMA, and gave the plaintiff until July 7, 2006, to show cause why his lawsuit should not be dismissed with respect to the other 153 defendants.

The plaintiff failed to do so, and the court dismissed all of the claims against all of the remaining 153 defendants on July 17, 2006.

== Lawsuit concerning Barack Obama ==
Berg filed a complaint in federal district court on August 21, 2008, against Democratic Party presidential nominee Senator Barack Obama, the Democratic National Committee and the Federal Election Commission, alleging that Obama was born in Mombasa, Kenya, and that the "Certificate of Live Birth" on Obama's website is a forgery. The court dismissed the complaint as "frivolous and not worthy of discussion." The judge also found that the harm Berg alleged did "not constitute an injury in fact" and that Berg's arguments to the contrary "ventured into the unreasonable." Berg filed a petition for writ of certiorari to the United States Supreme Court and also sought an injunction to suspend the election. The injunction was denied by Justice David Souter on November 3, 2008. Berg also sought an application for injunction pending the disposition of the petition for writ of certiorari; Justice Souter denied it, Berg refiled and submitted it to Justice Anthony Kennedy (who denied it), then refiled and submitted it to Justice Antonin Scalia, who referred it to the Court. On January 12, 2009, the Supreme Court denied Berg's petition for writ of certiorari (555 U.S. 1126), and on January 21 the Court denied the application for injunction (555 U.S. 1134).
