= Barbara Hafer =

American politician (born 1943)

73rd Treasurer of Pennsylvania
- In office January 21, 1997 – January 18, 2005
- Governor: Tom Ridge; Mark Schweiker; Ed Rendell
- Preceded by: Catherine Knoll
- Succeeded by: Bob Casey Jr.

46th Auditor General of Pennsylvania
- In office January 17, 1989 – January 21, 1997
- Governor: Robert Casey; Tom Ridge
- Preceded by: Donald Bailey
- Succeeded by: Bob Casey Jr.

Member of the Allegheny County Board of Commissioners
- In office January 2, 1984 – January 17, 1989
- Preceded by: William Hunt
- Succeeded by: Larry Dunn

Personal details
- Born: August 1, 1943 (age 83) Los Angeles, California, U.S.
- Party: Republican (before 2003); Democratic (2003–present)
- Spouse: John Pidgeon (deceased)
- Children: 1
- Education: Duquesne University (BA)

Barbara Hafer (born August 1, 1943) is an American politician from the Commonwealth of Pennsylvania. She served as a member of the Allegheny County Board of Commissioners from 1984 to 1989, as the Auditor General of Pennsylvania from 1989 to 1997 and as the Treasurer of Pennsylvania from 1997 to 2005.

In 1990, Barbara Hafer won the Republican nomination for governor challenging incumbent Democratic governor Robert P. Casey Sr. in the general election. On many issues Auditor Hafer ran to the left of the moderate Governor Casey. Bob Casey supported government bans on abortion, with Hafer being pro-abortion rights. Governor Casey maintained a strong lead in the polls and enjoyed high approval ratings. Hafer campaigned hard, but hurt herself when during the campaign she called the governor a "redneck Irishman." Her campaign was widely criticized for the remark helping Governor Casey seal his lead in both rural areas of the state which are normally Republican, as well as cement strong support from more traditional Democratic districts. Auditor Hafer was defeated by thirty-six percentage points.

Hafer explored a second run for the Republican nomination for Governor of Pennsylvania in the 2002 Pennsylvania gubernatorial election, but withdrew after the Republican Party favored Attorney General Mike Fisher. She went on to personally endorse Democratic nominee Ed Rendell in the gubernatorial general election of 2002 and joined the Democratic Party in 2003. After leaving office in 2005, Hafer considered running for several offices. Aside from a brief February 2010 candidacy for the U.S. House of Representatives Pennsylvania's 12th congressional district seat left vacant by the death of Rep. John Murtha, she never did.

== Early political career ==
Hafer began her working career as a public-health nurse in the Monongahela Valley. She would later use this experience as a platform in her 1990 gubernatorial campaign, in which she claimed a pregnant woman died in her arms from a botched illegal abortion, and subsequently supported a woman's right to an abortion.

She founded the Allegheny County Center for Victims of Violent Crime in 1973. Elsie Hillman, one of the donors to the center, convinced Hafer to run for public office, leading Hafer to run for the Allegheny County Board of Commissioners in 1983.

She defeated incumbent Republican County Commissioner William Hunt in the Primary Election, who had dismissed Hafer as "the little nurse from Elizabeth." In 1988, she ran for State Auditor General, and defeated incumbent Democratic Auditor Donald A. Bailey. She went on to serve two four-year terms in the post.

In 1990, she won the Republican Nomination for Governor to go against the incumbent Democratic governor Robert P. Casey in the general election. In many areas, Auditor Hafer ran to the left of moderate Governor Bob Casey Sr. Governor Casey was noted for his strong opposition to abortion rights with Auditor Hafer being pro-choice. Casey maintained a sizable lead in the polls and high approval ratings. Hafer campaigned hard, but hurt herself when she called the governor a "redneck Irishman." Hafer's campaign was widely criticized for the gaff, helping Governor Casey seal his commanding lead in both rural parts of the state which are predominately Republican as well as cementing strong support from the more traditional Democratic districts. Auditor Hafer was defeated by thirty-six percentage points in one of the most lopsided Gubernatorial elections in state history.

Unable to seek a third term as auditor general under Pennsylvania term limits Barbara Hafer announced she was running for State Treasurer in 1996 to succeed State Treasurer Catherine Baker Knoll. She faced Treasurer Knoll's daughter Mina Knoll in the general election. A bitter race ensued, with Auditor Hafer challenging Knoll's residency status (she lived in New York) while the Knoll For State Treasurer campaign alleged Auditor Hafer improperly used state funds for personal use as auditor general. Auditor Hafer would go on to win the election.

The race opened a rift between the two women that culminated in 2000 when Treasurer Knoll herself ran against Treasurer Hafer for treasurer. As the two most prominent women in Pennsylvania politics at the time, the election was noted for being even more bitter than the previous one; Treasurer Knoll again accused Treasurer Hafer of questionable state funds use as auditor general, while Treasurer Hafer countered that the SEC had investigated Knoll during her time as treasurer. Hafer also called the Knoll campaign "lying scumbags." Treasurer Hafer was narrowly reelected.

Her successor for auditor general, Bob Casey Jr., attempted to audit the public-employee pension funds that Treasurer Hafer is on the boards of. This opened a lengthy legal battle between Pennsylvania's two financial offices. Treasurer Hafer maintained no wrongdoing and alleged Auditor Casey had a conflict of interest, while Auditor Casey called her "a smear artist." Auditor Casey would also succeed Treasurer Hafer as state treasurer.

The Pennsylvania Report said that "She has never marched to a regular drummer, but that is part of her long-running appeal." In a 2002 PoliticsPA Feature story designating politicians with yearbook superlatives, she was named the "Most Popular."

== 2002 gubernatorial election and party-switch ==
In 2002, Treasurer Hafer explored a run for the Republican nomination for governor (incumbent Republican governor Mark Schweiker had already announced his intention not to contest the race). However, after it became clear that the GOP establishment had already decided on Pennsylvania Attorney General Mike Fisher as their candidate, she dropped out of the race. Treasurer Hafer went on to endorse the Democratic nominee, former Philadelphia mayor Ed Rendell, effectively severing all her remaining ties to the Republican Party. Her decision to endorse Mayor Rendell "psychologically helped break" the back of the Fisher For Governor campaign., and Mayor Rendell went on to win the Election.

In 2003, Treasurer Hafer completed her political conversion by switching to the Democratic Party. Her switch was criticized by Senator Rick Santorum and other Pennsylvania Republicans, for using the backing of the party for five statewide campaigns, only to then switch without even contesting a Primary. She countered that Senator Santorum being the "de facto" leader of the state party has moved them further to the right, alienating socially liberal (but fiscally conservative) Republicans like herself. She cemented herself as a Democrat by donating the maximum amount to Massachusetts Senator John Kerry's Presidential campaign, and endorsing Dan Onorato in his successful bid for Allegheny County chief executive. Hafer also donated to Mayor John Street's re-election campaign.

== Later political career ==
After her party switch, it was reported that she was considering challenging long-time rival and incumbent lieutenant governor Catherine Baker Knoll in the Democratic primary. She was also reportedly considering seeking the Democratic nomination for U.S. Senate against Republican senator Rick Santorum, with a likely primary challenge to the front-runner Bob Casey Jr., Hafer's other political rival. Hafer however affirmed that she buried the hatchet with all of her former rivals long ago, and did not run against either, endorsing Bob Casey Jr. as soon as he announced his Senate candidacy.

Barbara Hafer's daughter, Beth sought to run against Republican Congressman Tim Murphy in 2008, but narrowly lost the Democratic primary.

In February 2010, five years after leaving the office of Treasurer, Hafer declared her candidacy for the Congressional seat left vacant by the death of incumbent Democrat John Murtha. She sought the Democratic nomination for the May special election. During that time, Hafer accepted money from her chief campaign backer and lied about it to the FBI.

== Arrest and conviction ==
On July 21, 2016, Hafer was indicted on federal charges of lying about taking in more than $500,000 in consulting fees from a company that did business with her office. U.S. Attorney Peter Smith said Hafer lied to federal agents who interviewed her in May about money she secretly took in from a business person referred to in the indictment only as "Person #1". Sources close to the investigation described "Person #1" as moneyman Richard W. Ireland, of Chester County, one of Hafer's biggest campaign contributors. The case was investigated by the FBI, IRS and Pennsylvania State Police. She was later convicted and sentenced to 36 months probation and a $50,000 fine.

== Personal life ==
In the fall of 2010, Hafer was named in an estate lawsuit that revolves around her late husband, John Pidgeon. The lawsuit claims that she shifted more than $900,000 from her late husband's children and grandchildren to herself and her daughter in the final months of her husband's life. Pidgeon's children and grandchildren have claimed that Hafer took advantage of her husband's declining health and mental status to gain financial benefit.

Prior to her political career, Hafer was employed as a registered nurse. She resides in Indiana, Pennsylvania.

== See also ==
- List of American politicians who switched parties in office

Political offices
Preceded by Donald Bailey	Auditor General of Pennsylvania; 1989–1997	Succeeded by Bob Casey Jr.
Preceded by Catherine Knoll	Treasurer of Pennsylvania; 1997–2005	Succeeded by Bob Casey Jr.
Party political offices
Preceded by Susan M. Shanaman	Republican nominee for Auditor General of Pennsylvania; 1988, 1992	Succeeded by Robert Nyce
Preceded by William Scranton	Republican nominee for Governor of Pennsylvania; 1990	Succeeded by Tom Ridge
Preceded by Lowman S. Henry	Republican nominee for Treasurer of Pennsylvania; 1996, 2000	Succeeded by Jean Craige Pepper
