= Sto-Rox High School =

Location
- 1105 Valley Street; McKees Rocks, Allegheny County, Pennsylvania 15136; United States; 40.470874°N 80.074249°W

Information
- Type: Public
- Established: 1966
- School district: Sto-Rox School District
- Principal: Kim Price
- Staff: 34.26 (FTE)
- Grades: 7–12
- Student to teacher ratio: 13.84
- Colors: Kelly Green and White
- Mascot: Viking
- Website: High School

Sto-Rox High School is a high school located in the West Park neighborhood of Stowe Township, Pennsylvania. It is the only high school of the Sto-Rox School District, which educates the children of Stowe Township and the borough of McKees Rocks. According to the National Center for Education Statistics, in 2010, the school reported an enrollment of 409 pupils in grades 9th through 12th, with 316 pupils eligible for a federal free or reduced price lunch. The school employed 35 teachers yielding a student teacher ratio of 11.79:1. According to a report by the Pennsylvania Department of Education, 2 teachers were rated "Non‐Highly Qualified" under No Child Left Behind.

== Building ==
The current building of the Sto-Rox High School was erected in 1926. At that time, it was only the Stowe Township High School, until it merged with the McKees Rocks School District in 1966, thus forming Sto-Rox.

It is a three-story, yellow brick building, housing grades 9-12. Formerly, it was the Sto-Rox Junior/Senior High School, until, in 2002, the Sto-Rox Middle School was erected in Kennedy Township. Since it was built, numerous additions have been added to the building, though none in recent years. A few years ago, the high school underwent a partial renovation.

== Notable alumni ==
- Myron Brown (1987), professional basketball player
- David Cercone (1970), U.S. District Court judge
- Adam DiMichele (2003), Philadelphia Soul quarterback
- Chuck Fusina (1975), NFL quarterback
- John Kasich (1970), politician
- Bob Ligashesky (1981), college and NFL football coach
- Billy Mays (1976), television pitchman, best known for OxiClean
