= School district solicitor =

Legal representative of a school district

A school district solicitor is a type of solicitor general appointed by a local school district to represent the school district's legal interests and advise the district's governing body in the proper operation of the school district. The types of matters handled by school district solicitors can vary significantly, and often include drafting and making recommendations on policies; assisting with labor and employment matters; drafting and reviewing contracts for supplies, construction projects, real estate and more; representing schools in litigation; and assuring compliance with state and federal regulations governing the operation of schools.

Most local school districts are not sovereign entities, but instead get power from whatever state law creates them. In recent decades, state and federal laws regulating public school districts have become increasingly complex.

== Qualifications and background ==
In most jurisdictions of the United States, a school district solicitor must be a practicing lawyer. There generally is no special license or other registration required. Often, a school district solicitor will work in a private law firm, and the school district will contract with the lawyer or firm for the services. In more rare instances, particularly with larger school entities, the school district may employ its own in-house counsel to act as solicitor.

== Professional associations ==
School district solicitors have created a number of professional associations for networking and professional development. For example, the National School Boards Association (NSBA), which is a national advocacy organization made up of school boards from all over the United States, has an affiliated entity known as the Council of School Attorneys (COSA) similarly made up of school district solicitors from throughout the United States. Each state also has a state association of school district solicitors, often also associated with that state's school boards association.
