= 2000 Pennsylvania State Treasurer election =

2000 Pennsylvania Treasurer election
- November 7, 2000

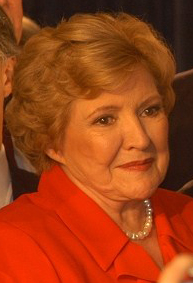
Nominee	Barbara Hafer	Catherine Knoll
Party	Republican	Democratic
Popular vote	2,307,422	2,211,471
Percentage	49.3%	47.2%
- County results Hafer: 40–50% 50–60% 60–70% 70–80% Knoll: 40–50% 50–60% 70–80%
Treasurer before election
Barbara Hafer
Republican
Elected Treasurer
Barbara Hafer
Republican

Pennsylvania's State Treasurer election was held November 7, 2000. Incumbent Republican Barbara Hafer won a narrow reelection. Her Democratic opponent was Catherine Baker Knoll, a former two-term treasurer. Hafer and Knoll, both of whom faced no primary opposition, ran a campaign marked by personal attacks. The two candidates had previously been involved in a very public feud because of events surrounding the 1996 election for this office; in that year, the term limited Knoll endorsed her daughter as successor. However, Hafer had questioned the residency status of Mina Knoll, an attack that the older Knoll believed was disingenuous and clouded her daughter's candidacy.

== General election ==
Pennsylvania State Treasurer election, 2000
Party	Candidate	Votes	%
Republican	Barbara Hafer (incumbent)	2,307,422	49.3
Democratic	Catherine Baker Knoll	2,211,471	47.2
Green	Barbara Knox	68,805	1.5
Constitution	John McDermott	41,093	0.9
Libertarian	John Famularo	30,867	0.7
Reform	Joe Patterson	21,276	0.5
