= Jenny Lee Bakery =

Historic bakery in Pennsylvania, United States

- Type: Bakery
- Founded: 1938
- Defunct: 2008
- Fate: Closed
- Successor: 5 Generation Bakers
- Number of locations: McKees Rocks, Pennsylvania; Market Square, Pittsburgh

Jenny Lee Bakery was a prominent bakery in McKees Rocks, Pennsylvania, United States.

The bakery was founded in 1938 by cousins Paul Baker and Bernard McDonald. The name came from the song "Sweet Jenny Lee from Sunny Tennessee", which was playing on the radio while the pair was traveling to a business meeting. It closed in 2008.

In 2009, several members of the family restarted the company under the name 5 Generation Bakers. The new version sells baked goods to local retailers such as the supermarket Giant Eagle.
