= McKees Rocks, Pennsylvania =

Borough in Pennsylvania, US

- Borough
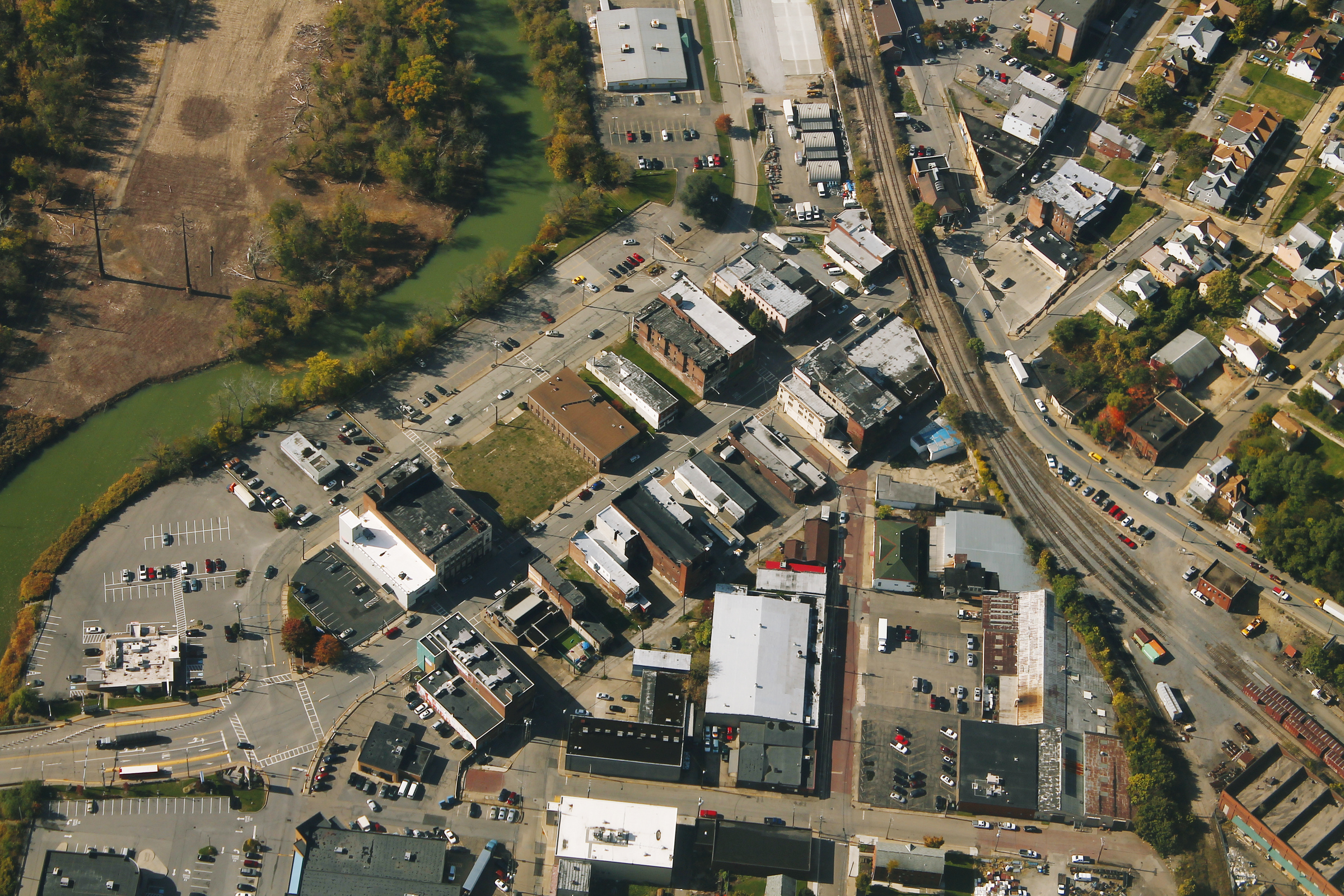
- Aerial view of McKees Rocks
- Nickname: "The Rocks"
- Interactive map of McKees Rocks, Pennsylvania
- Location within Pennsylvania Location within the United States
- Coordinates: 40°28′12.79″N 80°3′49.22″W
- Country: United States
- State: Pennsylvania
- County: Allegheny
- Settled: 1764
- Incorporated: 1892
- Named for: Alexander McKee

Area
  - Total: 1.12 sq mi (2.90 km^{2})
  - Land: 1.05 sq mi (2.73 km^{2})
  - Water: 0.062 sq mi (0.16 km^{2})

Population (2020)
  - Total: 5,920
  - Density: 5,606/sq mi (2,164.6/km^{2})
- Time zone: UTC−5 (EST)
  - Summer (DST): UTC−4 (EDT)
- ZIP Code: 15136
- Area code: 412
- Exchanges: 331, 771, 777, 778
- FIPS code: 42-46264
- School district: Sto-Rox
- Website: mckeesrockspa.us

McKees Rocks, also known as "The Rocks", is a borough in Allegheny County, Pennsylvania, United States. It lies along the south bank of the Ohio River and is part of the Pittsburgh metropolitan area. The population was 5,920 at the 2020 census.

In the past, the city was known for its extensive iron and steel interests. There were large railroad machine shops and manufacturers of locomotives, freight and passenger cars. Other factories produced springs, enamel ware, lumber, wall materials, plaster, nuts and bolts, malleable castings, chains and forgings, tin ware, concrete, and cigars.

The Pittsburgh, Allegheny and McKees Rocks Railroad was, and the Pittsburgh and Ohio Central Railroad is, located in an area along the river known as the "Bottoms". The McKees Rocks Bridge, which carries traffic between McKees Rocks and Pittsburgh, is the longest bridge in Allegheny County, at 7,293 feet (2,223 m). McKees Rocks had one of the largest Indian mounds in the state, built by the Adena and Hopewell peoples a thousand years before Europeans entered the area.

The borough is within the Sto-Rox School District, which serves McKees Rocks and neighboring Stowe Township. The local high school is Sto-Rox High School.

== History ==
For thousands of years, Native Americans inhabited the region. The Adena culture built a large earthwork mound here, which was a burial site. It was augmented in later years by members of the Hopewell culture. This was the largest such mound in the state. The Carnegie Museum of Natural History excavated half the mound in 1896. Its archaeologists traced the construction history and unearthed the remains of 33 people. The mound crowned a high bluff that overlooks Chartiers Creek and the Ohio River. The bluff under the mound was quarried for municipal paving some time after the archaeological dig, eliminating what remained of the Indian burial site. This site was considered by George Washington as a possible location for Fort Pitt, which he eventually ordered built on the site of the destroyed French Fort Duquesne in what is now Pittsburgh's Point State Park.

Around 1749, the French-Canadian explorer Pierre Joseph Celoron de Blainville visited the area and discovered a "written rock" inscribed with markings he believed were made by Native Americans. Celeron named the place after the rock, and it eventually became known as McKees Rocks. Writing in 1918, historian John Boucher stated that the inscriptions had "long since faded away, if indeed they were anything other than marks made by English fur traders."

The borough derives its name from trader Alexander McKee, who also served as an Indian agent. He was given a 1,300-acre (530 ha) tract of land in 1764 for his services during the French and Indian War. The name also related to a rocky projection into the river at this site. In 1769, the name McKees Rocks was placed on an official deed, and that year is considered to be its founding date. In 1892, it was incorporated as a borough. In 1900, 6,353 people resided in the borough; in 1910, 14,702; in 1920, 16,713; and in 1940, 17,021 people inhabited McKees Rocks. After industrial restructuring caused a loss of jobs in the city, the population declined, to 6,104 at the 2010 census.

Mann's Hotel, which was possibly one of the oldest buildings in the Pittsburgh area, was located at 23 Singer Avenue in McKees Rocks. It was believed to have been built around 1803, although some sources put the construction in the 18th century. It is rumored that George Washington stayed there when he was surveying the Indian mound. In 1979, the building avoided demolition. When the county wanted to build a new Windgap Bridge beside the old one, it needed the space occupied by Mann's Hotel. However, when a Public Utility Commission judge ruled the county had to pay to relocate the building, the county opted to build the new bridge in the place of the old instead. On October 12, 2009, Mann's Hotel was condemned due to neglect. It was demolished because of its deteriorating condition and the need for a lateral storm water runoff from neighboring Kennedy Township.

The "Bottoms" neighborhood is the site of the McKees Rocks Indian Mound, designated as a National Historic Landmark. In 1896, archaeologists of the Carnegie Museum partially excavated the mound, unearthing over 30 graves. Artifacts preserved from this excavation are the only parts of the mound that are intact today. A 1946 initiative to turn the mound into a national park petered out. By the 1950s, a large portion of the mound had fallen into the Ohio river. In 2001, an initiative to erect a historic marker was started, and on May 18, 2002, a Pennsylvania Historical Marker was dedicated at the base of the bluff. In the late 2000s, a disagreement over the remains moved from the mound was reported in local news. Industrial development, including a quarry and a cement plant have reduced the remainder and there is no public access today.

McKees Rocks was the site of one of the pivotal labor conflicts of the early 20th century, the 1909 McKees Rocks Strike. In the summer and early fall of 1909, some 5,000 workers of the Pressed Steel Car Company's plant at McKees Rocks went on strike, joined by 3,000 others who worked for the Standard Steel Car Company of Butler and others in New Castle. The strike, led by organizers of the Industrial Workers of the World (IWW), was repressed by armed security guards and the state militia, resulting in at least a dozen deaths. The conflict involved participants on both sides.

In 1940, three decapitated bodies were found in boxcars in McKees Rocks during a routine train inspection. The train cars had apparently come from Youngstown. In fact, throughout the 1920s, various dismembered and decapitated bodies were recovered in or around the nearby swamp areas of New Castle and McKees Rocks. Despite similarities to a series of murders that had occurred in Cleveland during the same time period, the murders were never solved or officially connected to the killings in Ohio.

The multimillion-dollar, 40,000 sq ft (3,700 m^{2}) Father Ryan Cultural Arts Center opened in 2008, at 420 Chartiers Avenue, adjacent to the F.O.R. Sto-Rox Library (at 500 Chartiers Avenue). It offers many creative and performing arts courses to the public.

== Geography ==
McKees Rocks is located at 40°28′13″N 80°3′49″W (40.470218, −80.063674).

According to the United States Census Bureau, the borough has a total area of 1.1 square miles (2.8 km^{2}), of which 1.0 square mile (2.6 km^{2}) is land and 0.1 square miles (0.26 km^{2}), or 6.31%, is water.

=== Surrounding and adjacent neighborhoods ===
McKees Rocks is made up of several neighborhoods, such as Meyers Ridge, and "The Bottoms". McKees Rocks has two borders by land: Kennedy Township to the west and Stowe Township to the north. Chartiers Creek separates McKees Rocks from two Pittsburgh neighborhoods and have connectors to both:

- Windgap to the southwest via Windgap Bridge.
- Esplen to the south and southeast via Linden Ave. Bridge

Across the Ohio River, McKees Rocks runs adjacent to two other Pittsburgh neighborhoods:

- Brighton Heights to the northeast via McKees Rocks Bridge. As with Windgap, this is not a direct connection as Stowe Township separates the two neighborhoods in the middle of the bridge.
- Marshall-Shadeland to the southeast and under the east end of the bridge

== Demographics ==
Historical population
Census	Pop.	Note	%±
1890	1,687		—
1900	6,352		276.5%
1910	14,702		131.5%
1920	16,713		13.7%
1930	18,116		8.4%
1940	17,021		−6.0%
1950	16,241		−4.6%
1960	13,185		−18.8%
1970	11,901		−9.7%
1980	8,742		−26.5%
1990	7,691		−12.0%
2000	6,622		−13.9%
2010	6,104		−7.8%
2020	5,920		−3.0%

As of the 2000 census, there were 6,622 people, 2,905 households, and 1,652 families residing in the borough. The population density was 6,377.5 inhabitants per square mile (2,462.4/km^{2}). There were 3,402 housing units at an average density of 3,276.4 per square mile (1,265.0/km^{2}). The racial makeup of the borough was 82.71% White, 14.06% African American, 0.26% Native American, 0.68% Asian, 0.03% Pacific Islander, 0.41% from other races, and 1.86% from two or more races. Hispanic or Latino of any race were 1.09% of the population.

The 2010 census revealed there were 6,104 residents. The population density was 6003.25 people per square mile. The racial makeup was 62.17% White, 35.26% African American, 0.57% Asian, and 0.34% from other races. Hispanic or Latino of any race were 1.65% of the population.

There were 2,905 households, out of which 26.0% had children under the age of 18 living with them, 29.4% were married couples living together, 21.3% had a female householder with no husband present, and 43.1% were non-families. 37.8% of all households were made up of individuals, and 17.2% had someone living alone who was 65 or older. The average household size was 2.24 and the average family size was 2.96.

The population included 24.1% under the age of 18, 7.8% from 18 to 24, 28.3% from 25 to 44, 20.9% from 45 to 64, and 19.0% who were 65 or older. The median age was 38. For every 100 females, there were 89.1 males; for every 100 females age 18 and over, there were 84.2 males.

The median income for a household in the borough was $22,278, and the median income for a family was $29,063. Males had a median income of $25,872 versus $23,402 for females. The per capita income for the borough was $13,858. About 20.5% of families and 25.3% of the population were below the poverty line, including 38.8% of those under age 18 and 17.0% of those age 65 or over

== Politics ==
Presidential election results
Year	Republican	Democratic	Third parties
2020	32% 726	65% 1,462	1% 35
2016	31% 703	66% 1,504	3% 61
2012	23% 524	76% 1,724	1% 20

== Notable people ==
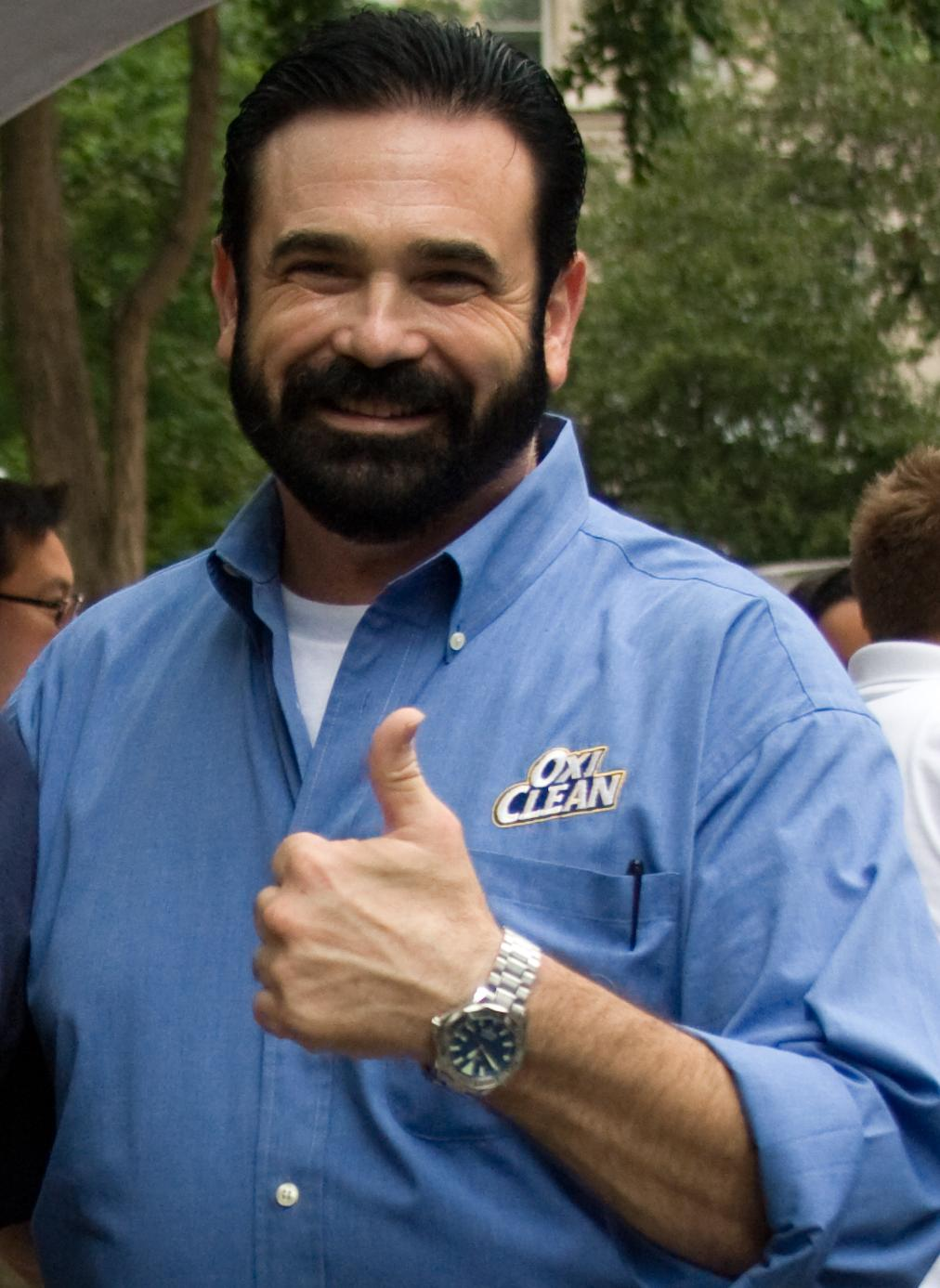
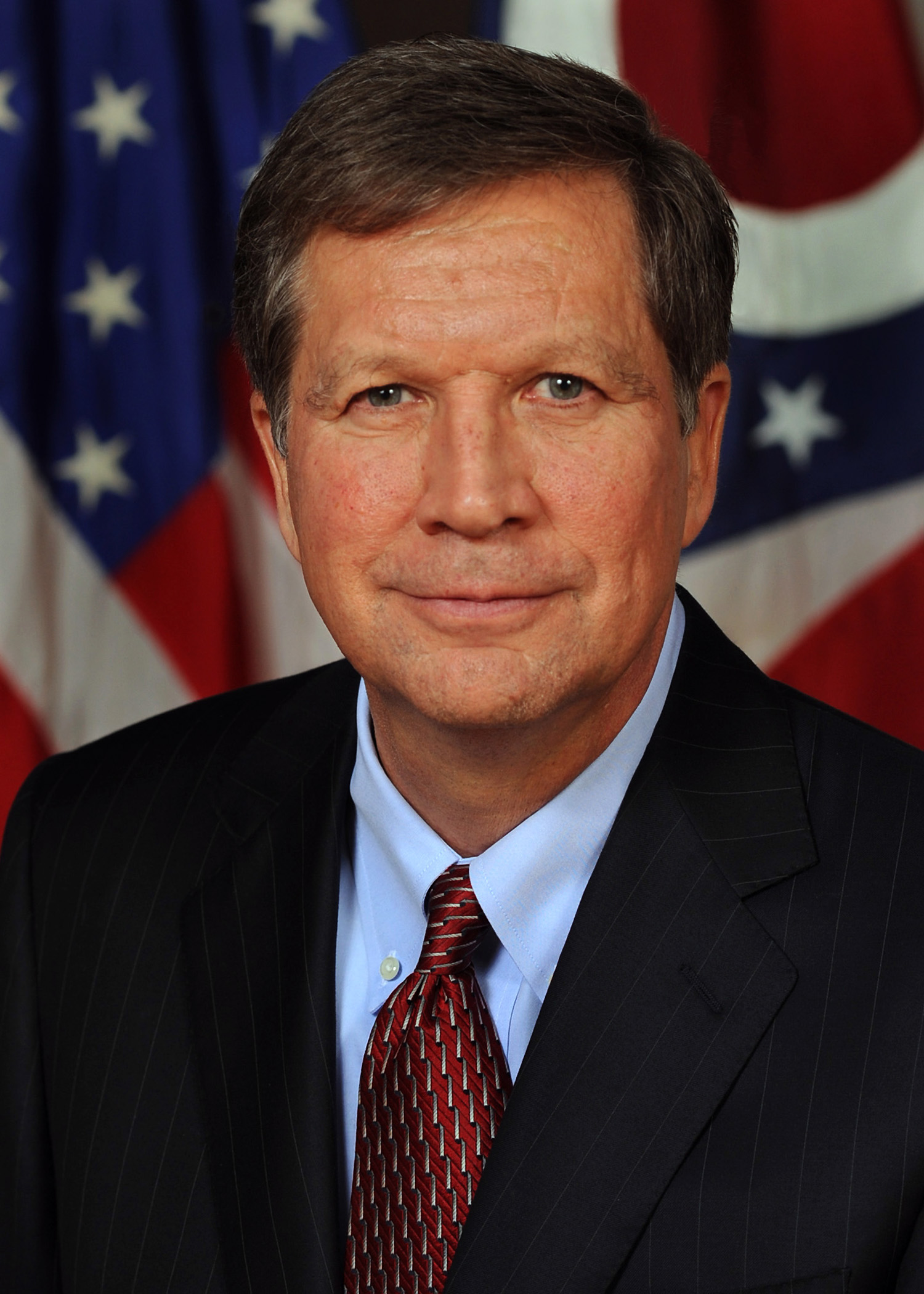
Late advertisement spokesperson Billy Mays and Ohio governor John Kasich are notable people from McKees Rocks
- Myron Brown, Slippery Rock University basketball star and NBA player
- Tom Clements, Canadian Football League Quarterback (1975–1987), quarterbacks coach of the Green Bay Packers
- Merle Fainsod (1907–1972), Harvard University political scientist
- Chuck Fusina, Penn State, USFL, and NFL football player
- Damar Hamlin, NFL player for the Buffalo Bills
- Brad Johns, hair colorist
- John Kasich, 69th governor of Ohio from 2011 to 2019, former Congressman, and presidential candidate in 2000 and 2016
- Catherine Baker Knoll, 30th Lieutenant Governor of Pennsylvania (2003–2008)
- Carl Kosak, author
- Al Kozar, Major League Baseball infielder
- Ted Kwalick, Penn State all-America football player and San Francisco 49ers all-Pro tight end; member of the College Football Hall of Fame
- Bob Ligashesky, special teams coordinator for the Syracuse Orange
- Billy Mays, television pitchman and Oxi-Clean spokesman, known for his bearded face and distinct voice.
- Roman Macek, former American football player and pro wrestler under the ring name Luca Crusifino
- Alex Sandusky (1932–2020), professional football player
- Jeff Smith, cartoonist, best known as the creator of the self-published comic book series Bone
- Paul Spadafora, former IBF world lightweight boxing champion, known as the "Pittsburgh Kid"
- Olive Thomas, silent film actress, and the original flapper

== In popular culture ==
McKees Rocks is the fictional setting of the novels Duffy's Rocks by Edward Fenton, Riot by William Trautmann, and more than a dozen novels by the crime writer K. C. Constantine.

== Gallery ==
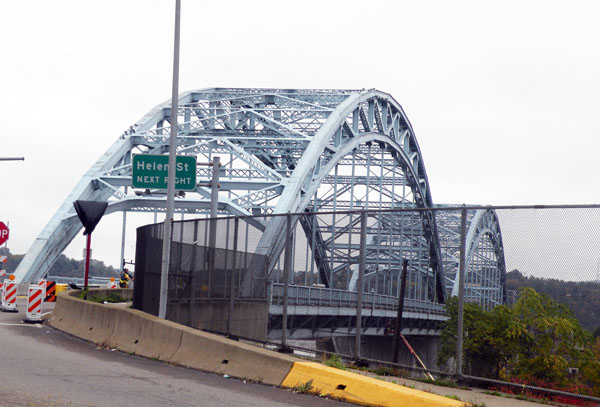
The McKees Rocks Bridge from Island Avenue

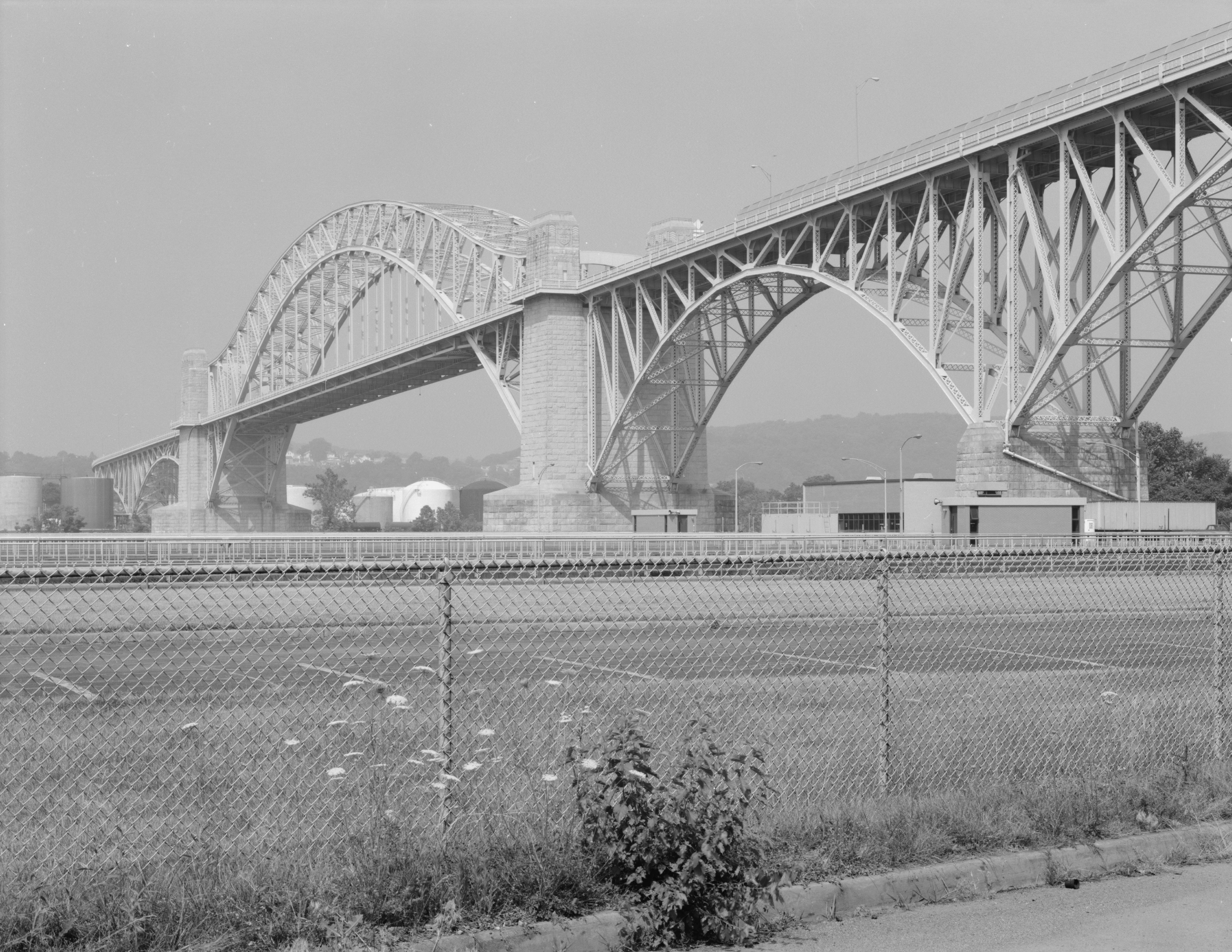
Another view of the McKees Rocks Bridge

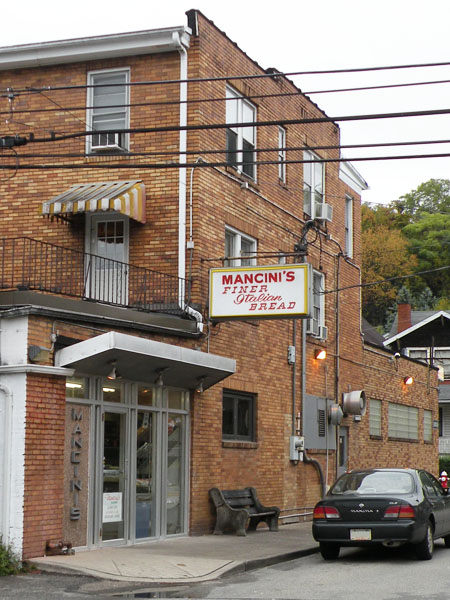
Mancini's Bakery (since 1926)

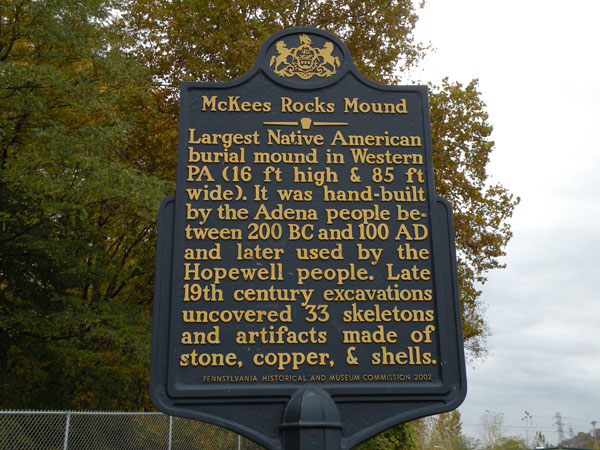
McKees Rocks Mound historical marker

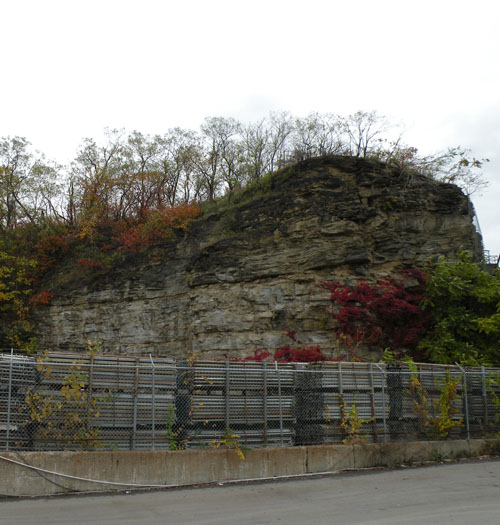
"The Rocks" of McKees Rocks

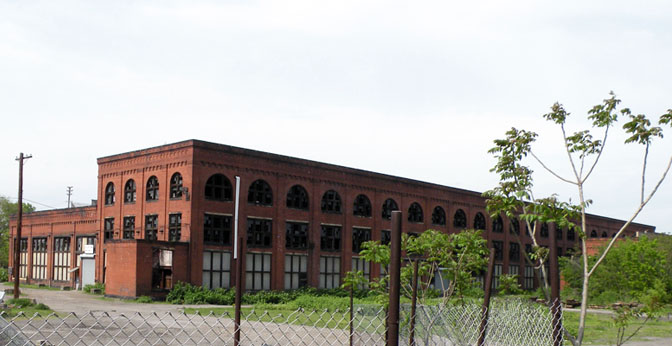
Pittsburgh and Lake Erie Railroad Locomotive Shops

== See also ==
- Hachmeister-Lind
- Jenny Lee Bakery
- List of cities and towns along the Ohio River
- Pressed Steel Car Strike of 1909

Preceded by Bellevue	Bordering communities of Pittsburgh	Succeeded by Moon Run
