= Pennsylvania Office of Administration =

Agency overview
- Jurisdiction: State government of Pennsylvania
- Headquarters: 207 Finance Building; Harrisburg, Pennsylvania
- Employees: 600+
- Agency executive: Michael Newsome, Secretary
- Website: OA, Secretary

Pennsylvania Office of Administration is a cabinet-level agency in Pennsylvania. It is responsible for managing the business support for all other state agencies, boards, and commissions. It also manages the state's emergency broadcast system.

== See also ==
- List of Pennsylvania state agencies
