= Stowe Township, Pennsylvania =

Township in Pennsylvania, US

Stowe Township
- Township
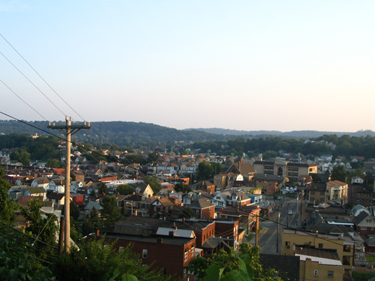
- A small part of the West Park neighborhood in Stowe Township. Sto-Rox High School is visible.

- Flag

- Location in Allegheny County and state of Pennsylvania
- Coordinates: 40°28′47″N 80°4′26″W
- Country: United States
- State: Pennsylvania
- County: Allegheny

Area
  - Total: 2.30 sq mi (5.95 km^{2})
  - Land: 1.98 sq mi (5.13 km^{2})
  - Water: 0.31 sq mi (0.81 km^{2})

Population (2010)
  - Total: 6,362
  - Estimate (2018): 6,166
  - Density: 3,130.6/sq mi (1,208.75/km^{2})
- Time zone: UTC-5 (Eastern (EST))
  - Summer (DST): UTC-4 (EDT)
- ZIP codes: 15136
- Area code: 412
- FIPS code: 42-003-74648
- Website: https://stowetwp.net/

Stowe Township is a township in Allegheny County, Pennsylvania, United States. The population was 6,362 at the 2010 census.

It is located in the Sto-Rox School District, which serves both Stowe Township and the neighboring borough of McKees Rocks. All locations in Stowe Township have McKees Rocks addresses.

Stowe Township has partnered with the Allegheny Together organization to revitalize its main business district on Broadway Avenue.

The area is served by Port Authority bus routes 21, 22, and 24.

== Geography ==
Stowe Township is located at 40°28′46″N 80°4′26″W (40.479668, -80.07389).

According to the United States Census Bureau, the township has a total area of 2.3 square miles (6.0 km^{2}), of which 2.0 square miles (5.2 km^{2}) is land and 0.4 square miles (1.0 km^{2}), or 15.38%, is water.

=== Neighborhoods ===
- Island Heights, only accessible through Kennedy Township, located on a slope overlooking Neville Island
- Pittock, very small Italian neighborhood located just off PA 51 Northbound, before the Fleming Park Bridge
- West Park, a mixed residential and commercial neighborhood, where the majority of the buildings were built in the 1920s
- Pleasant Ridge, a mixed-income housing development
- Presston, a very small neighborhood of duplex townhomes, originally built as housing for the adjacent Pressed Steel Car Company. It was originally called Schoenville.
- Norwood, a small, older neighborhood of small, mostly 2 story homes. This section of Stowe Township is inhabited by many families that are 2nd and 3rd generation Italian.

=== Surrounding and adjacent neighborhoods ===
Stowe Township has two land borders, with Kennedy Township to the west and McKees Rocks to the south. Across the Ohio River, Stowe Township runs adjacent with (from northeast to southwest) Neville Island (with direct link via Fleming Park Bridge), Avalon, Bellevue, and the Pittsburgh neighborhoods of Marshall-Shadeland and Brighton Heights (which is not directly adjacent to Stowe but has a direct link with the eastern end of the McKees Rocks Bridge, which passes over the Marshall-Shadeland area first).

== Demographics ==
Historical population
| Census | Pop. | Note | %± |
|---|---|---|---|
| 1970 | 10,119 | | — |
| 1980 | 9,202 | | −9.1% |
| 1990 | 7,681 | | −16.5% |
| 2000 | 6,706 | | −12.7% |
| 2010 | 6,362 | | −5.1% |
| 2016 (est.) | 6,206 | | −2.5% |
U.S. Decennial Census

As of the census of 2000, there were 6,706 people, 3,061 households, and 1,805 families residing in the township. The population density was 3,391.4 inhabitants per square mile (1,309.4/km^{2}). There were 3,556 housing units at an average density of 1,798.3 per square mile (694.3/km^{2}). The racial makeup of the township was 90.44% White, 8.04% African American, 0.21% Native American, 0.16% Asian, 0.22% from other races, and 0.92% from two or more races. 0.42% of the population were Hispanic or Latino of any race.

There were 3,061 households, out of which 21.9% had children under the age of 18 living with them, 38.0% were married couples living together, 15.8% had a female householder with no husband present, and 41.0% were non-families. 36.3% of all households were made up of individuals, and 16.7% had someone living alone who was 65 years of age or older. The average household size was 2.17 and the average family size was 2.83.

In the township the population was spread out, with 19.9% under the age of 18, 7.2% from 18 to 24, 27.1% from 25 to 44, 22.7% from 45 to 64, and 23.1% who were 65 years of age or older. The median age was 42 years. For every 100 females, there were 87.9 males. For every 100 females age 18 and over, there were 84.7 males.

The median income for a household in the township was $29,688, and the median income for a family was $36,688. Males had a median income of $31,151 versus $28,221 for females. The per capita income for the township was $17,783. About 9.0% of families and 13.3% of the population were below the poverty line, including 19.2% of those under age 18 and 8.0% of those age 65 or over.

== Government and politics ==
Presidential Elections Results
| Year | Republican | Democratic | Third Parties |
|---|---|---|---|
| 2020 | 39% 1,047 | 59% 1,634 | 1% 29 |
| 2016 | 38% 1,014 | 60% 1,587 | 2% 34 |
| 2012 | 32% 842 | 68% 1,783 | 1% 24 |

== Notable people ==
- Michael Musmanno, Justice of the Supreme Court of Pennsylvania
- William F. Cercone, Judge of the Superior Court of Pennsylvania
- David S. Cercone, Judge of the United States District Court for the Western District of Pennsylvania; grandnephew of William Cercone

== See also ==
- Stowe Tunnel
