= Alfred L. Werker =

American film director

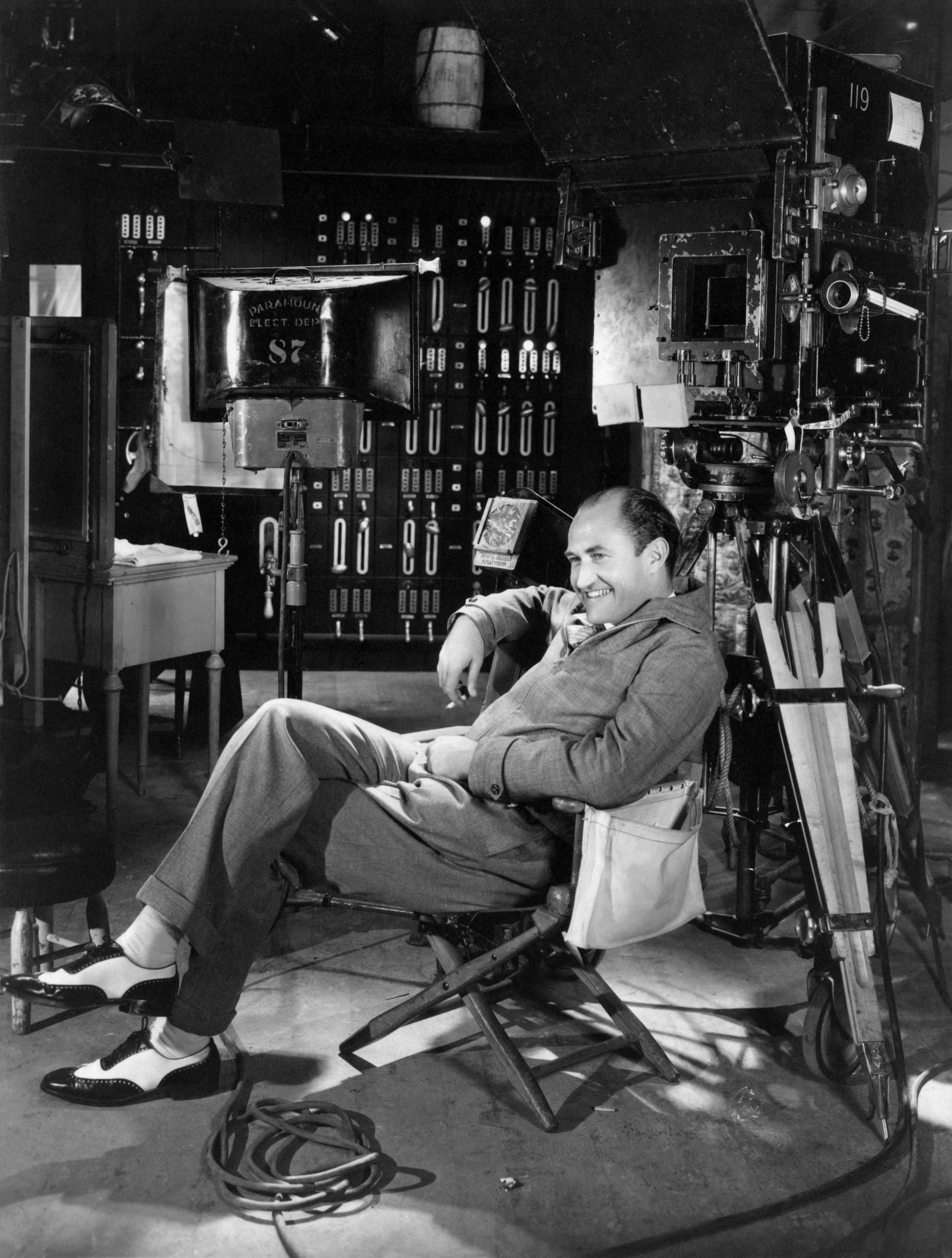
- Born: Alfred Louis Werker; December 2, 1896; Deadwood, South Dakota, United States
- Died: July 28, 1975 (aged 78); Orange County, California, United States

Alfred L. Werker (December 2, 1896 – July 28, 1975) was an American film director whose work in movies spanned from 1917 through 1957. After a number of film production jobs and assistant directing, Werker co-directed his first film, Ridin' the Wind, in 1925 alongside director Del Andrews. He was brought in by Fox Film Corporation executives to re-shoot and re-edit Erich von Stroheim's film Hello, Sister! (1933), co-starring Boots Mallory and ZaSu Pitts.

Most of Werker's work is unremarkable, but a few were well received by critics. Those films included House of Rothschild (1934) and The Adventures of Sherlock Holmes (1939); the latter film is considered one of the best in the Sherlock Holmes series. Lost Boundaries, inspired by a true story of a Black doctor passing as white, has grown in critical consensus.

During the early 1940s, he directed a number of comedies including Laurel & Hardy's A-Haunting We Will Go (1942).

In the late 1940s, Werker worked for the B-picture film studio Eagle-Lion Films. Notable films from that period include the unique mystery thriller Repeat Performance (1947) and He Walked by Night (1948). The latter film, however, was taken over by uncredited director Anthony Mann. In 1949 He Walked by Night won the Locarno International Film Festival's award for Best Police Film. The following year, Werker was nominated for, but did not win, the Directors Guild of America Outstanding Directorial Achievement in Motion Pictures for Lost Boundaries (1949).

== Filmography ==
Year	Film	Credited as		Notes
Year	Film	Director	Assistant Director	Notes
1917	The Firefly of Tough Luck		Yes	
1917	The Regenerates		Yes	
1919	The Hoodlum		Yes	Alternative titles: The Ragamuffin (UK)
1920	Pollyanna		Yes	
1925	That Devil Quemado		Yes	
1925	The Bandit's Baby		Yes	
1925	The Wild Bull's Lair		Yes	
1925	Ridin' the Wind	Yes		Co-directed with Del Andrews
1926	The Tough Guy		Yes	
1926	Lone Hand Saunders		Yes	
1928	The Pioneer Scout	Yes		Co-directed with Lloyd Ingraham
1928	The Sunset Legion	Yes		Co-directed with Lloyd Ingraham
1928	Kit Carson	Yes		
1929	Blue Skies	Yes		
1929	Chasing Through Europe	Yes		Co-directed with David Butler
1930	Double Cross Roads	Yes		
1930	Last of the Duanes	Yes		
1931	Fair Warning	Yes		
1931	Annabelle's Affairs	Yes		Alternative titles: Good Gracious Annabelle; The Affairs of Annabelle; Two Can Play
1931	Heartbreak	Yes		
1932	The Gay Caballero	Yes		
1932	Bachelor's Affairs	Yes		
1932	Rackety Rax	Yes		
1933	It's Great to Be Alive	Yes		
1933	Hello, Sister!	Yes		Alternative titles: Walking Down Broadway; Clipped Wings (UK)
1933	Advice to the Lovelorn	Yes		Alternative titles: Advice to the Forlorn
1934	The House of Rothschild	Yes		
1934	You Belong to Me	Yes		
1935	Stolen Harmony	Yes		
1936	Love in Exile	Yes		
1937	We Have Our Moments	Yes		
1937	Wild and Woolly	Yes		
1937	Big Town Girl	Yes		
1938	City Girl	Yes		
1938	Kidnapped	Yes		Alternative titles: Kidnapped: The Adventures of David Balfour
1938	Gateway	Yes		
1938	Up the River	Yes		
1939	It Could Happen to You	Yes		
1939	News Is Made at Night	Yes		
1939	The Adventures of Sherlock Holmes	Yes		Alternative titles: Sherlock Holmes (UK)
1941	The Reluctant Dragon	Yes		Alternative titles: A Day at Disneys; Behind the Scenes at Walt Disney Studio
1941	Moon Over Her Shoulder	Yes		
1942	Whispering Ghosts	Yes		
1942	A-Haunting We Will Go	Yes		
1942	The Mad Martindales	Yes		
1944	My Pal Wolf	Yes		
1946	Shock	Yes		
1947	Repeat Performance	Yes		
1947	Pirates of Monterey	Yes		
1948	He Walked by Night	Yes		Co-directed with Anthony Mann (uncredited)
1949	Lost Boundaries	Yes		
1951	Sealed Cargo	Yes		
1952	Walk East on Beacon	Yes		Alternative titles: Walk East on Beacon!; The Crime of the Century (UK)
1953	The Last Posse	Yes		
1953	Devil's Canyon	Yes		
1954	Three Hours to Kill	Yes		
1955	Canyon Crossroads	Yes		
1955	At Gunpoint	Yes		Alternative titles: Gunpoint! (UK)
1956	Rebel in Town	Yes		
1957	The Young Don't Cry	Yes		

== Bibliography ==
- Katz, Ephraim (1979). The Film Encyclopedia (1 ed.). New York: Thomas Y. Crowell Publishers. pp. 1223–1224. ISBN 0690012047.
