= Hands Across the Border =

Hands Across the Border may refer to:

- Hands Across the Border (1944 film), an American Western film
- Hands Across the Border (1926 film), an American silent Western film
- Hands Across the Border (campaign), a campaign founded in support of Scotland remaining in the United Kingdom
