= Albert Prisco =

American actor

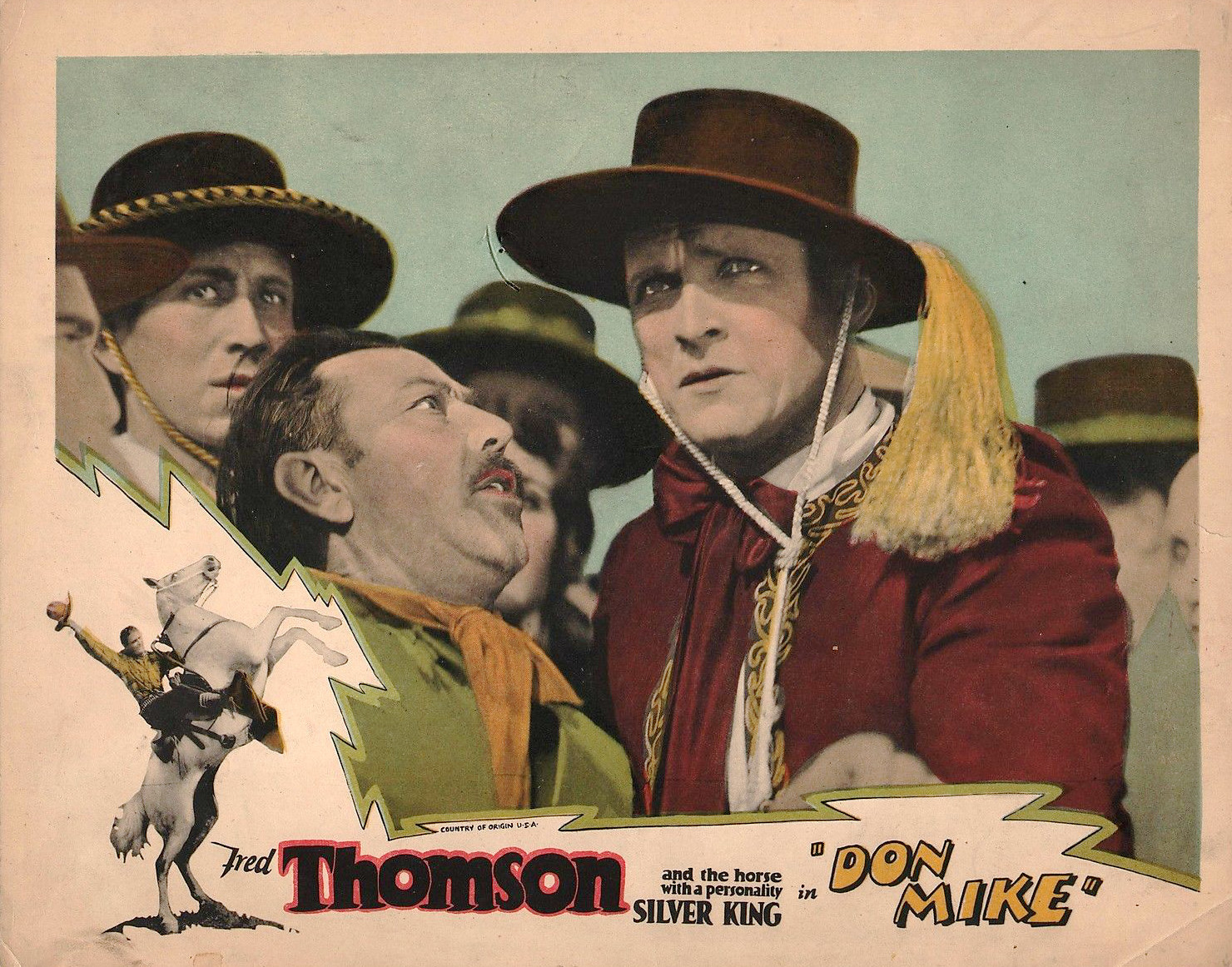
- Lobby card for Don Mike (1927) with Albert Prisco (lower left) and Fred Thomson
- Born: January 28, 1890; Naples, Kingdom of Italy
- Occupation: Actor

Albert Prisco (January 28, 1890 – ?) was an American actor born in Naples, Italy. He appeared in 28 films between 1921 and 1935.

== Filmography ==
Year	Title	Role	Notes
1914	Trapped in the Great Metropolis	Pizzoli	
1914	The Great Mysteries of New York		
1921	The Love Light	Pietro	
1921	The Jolt	Jerry Limur	
1922	The Unfoldment	Angus	
1922	Monte Cristo	Baron Danglars	
1922	The Power of Love	Don Alvarez	
1923	The Voice from the Minaret	Seleim	
1923	The Gentleman from America	Grand Duke	
1923	Gossip	John Magoo	
1923	Legally Dead	The Anarchist	
1923	The Hunchback of Notre Dame	Minor Role	Uncredited
1923	The Song of Love	Chamba	
1924	The Sea Hawk	Yusuf-Ben-Moktar	
1925	The Great Circus Mystery		Serial
1925	That Devil Quemado	José Ramériz	
1925	Perils of the Wild	Tonie	Serial
1925	The Scarlet Streak	Monk	Serial
1926	The Nutcracker	Señor Gonzales	
1926	The Midnight Sun	Messenger	
1926	Lone Hand Saunders	Charlie	
1926	The White Black Sheep	Kadir	
1927	Don Mike	Don Luis Ybara	
1927	The King of Kings		Uncredited
1927	The Prairie King	Dan Murdock	
1927	Soft Cushions	The Wazir	
1928	Won in the Clouds	Bangula	
1929	The Ace of Scotland Yard	Prince Darius	Serial
1935	Les Misérables	Galley Prisoner	Uncredited
1935	Escape from Devil's Island	Joumet	Uncredited, (final film role)
