= Kit Carson (1928 film) =

1928 film

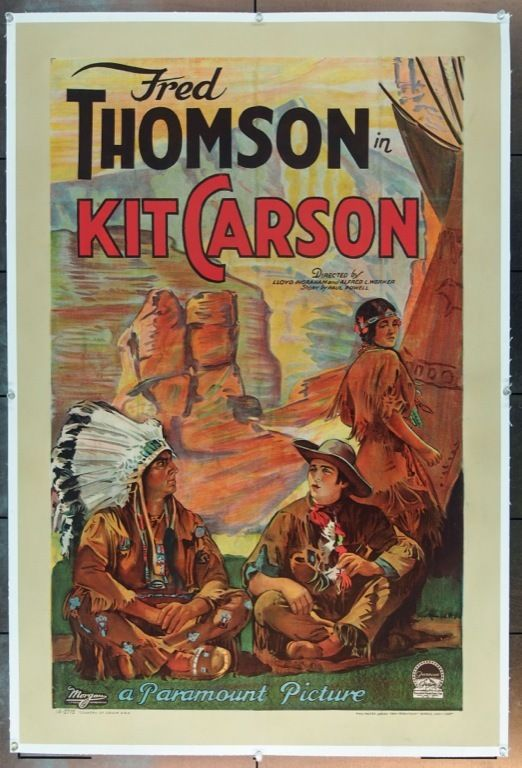
- Directed by: Lloyd Ingraham; Alfred L. Werker
- Screenplay by: Frederic Hatton; Frances Marion; Paul Powell
- Produced by: Jesse L. Lasky; Adolph Zukor
- Starring: Fred Thomson; Nora Lane; Dorothy King; Raoul Paoli; William Courtright; Nelson McDowell
- Cinematography: Mack Stengler
- Edited by: W. Duncan Mansfield
- Production company: Famous Players–Lasky Corporation
- Distributed by: Paramount Pictures
- Release date: June 23, 1928
- Running time: 84 minutes
- Country: United States
- Languages: Silent; English intertitles

Kit Carson is a surviving 1928 American silent Western film directed by Lloyd Ingraham and Alfred L. Werker and written by Frederic Hatton, Frances Marion and Paul Powell. The film stars Fred Thomson, Nora Lane, Dorothy King (credited as Dorothy Janis), Raoul Paoli, William Courtright and Nelson McDowell. The film was released on June 23, 1928, by Paramount Pictures. It is loosely inspired by the life of the frontiersman Kit Carson. A sound film biopic Kit Carson was released in 1940. This film is notable as it was Fred Thomson's final film appearance.

== Cast ==
- Fred Thomson as Kit Carson
- Nora Lane as Josefa
- Dorothy King as Sings-in-the-Clouds
- Raoul Paoli as Shuman
- William Courtright as Old Bill Williams
- Nelson McDowell as Jim Bridger
- Ray Turner as Smokey

== Production ==
Exterior shots were filmed on the Navajo Reservation in Arizona.

== Preservation status ==
- The film is preserved at the Cinemteket-Svenska Filminstitutet, Stockholm.
