= At the Sign of the Jack O'Lantern =

1922 film

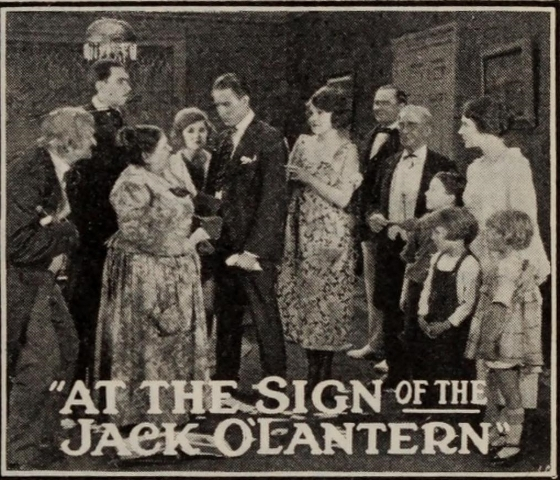
- Still from film (April 1922)
- Directed by: Lloyd Ingraham
- Screenplay by: Lloyd Ingraham; David Kirkland
- Based on: At the Sign of the Jack O'Lantern by Myrtle Reed
- Produced by: H. J. Reynolds
- Starring: Betty Ross Clarke; Earl Schenck; Wade Boteler
- Cinematography: Ross Fisher
- Production company: Renco Film Co.
- Distributed by: W. W. Hodkinson Corporation
- Release date: January 22, 1922
- Running time: 6 reels
- Country: United States
- Language: Silent (English intertitles)

At the Sign of the Jack O'Lantern is a 1922 American silent comedy drama film directed by Lloyd Ingraham, who co-wrote the film adaption with David Kirkland. It stars Betty Ross Clarke, Earl Schenck, and Wade Boteler. The film is today considered lost.

The screenplay was based on the eponymous novel by Myrtle Reed, who also wrote cookbooks under the pen name Olivia Green and committed suicide in 1911.

== Plot ==
Harlan Carr and his wife are left $600 and a country home called "The Jack O'Lantern" in New England by his uncle's will. The will provides that a future legacy will come to him if he lives in the estate for six months. Carr and his wife take up residence in the home, where all kinds of ghostly events take place to frighten them out. A group of guests arrive who were all disinherited relatives to his uncle, and they try to take over. They quickly make life miserable for the couple, who tolerate them and their unpleasantness only out of fear of losing the legacy. At last Harlan loses all patience and orders them from the house. Then, unexpectedly, the family lawyer informs the Carrs that having done exactly as their uncle had wished they would, they will be rewarded with the remainder of their uncle's money.

== Cast ==
- Betty Ross Clarke as Mrs. Carr
- Earl Schenck as Harlan Carr
- Wade Boteler as Dick
- Victor Potel as The poet
- Clara Clark Ward as Mrs. Dodd
- Monte Collins as Jeremiah Bradford
- William Courtright as Uncle Skyles
- Mrs. Raymond Hatton as Mrs. Holmes
- Newton Hall as Willie
- Zella Ingraham as Elaine

== Reviews and reception ==
A review in Moving Picture World from January 1922, said that Ingraham "has given the screen an entertaining production". The review gave positive reviews for the acting, noting that it "goes a long way toward lending plausibility to a number of events which are somewhat amazing, but which, nevertheless, are not too far fetched to seem possible". A review in The Film Daily from 1922, said the story was "built up with much detail and some amusing comedy...but lacks plot and drama". The review was positive about the direction of Ingraham, stating that he "keeps things moving and handles players well".

== See also ==
- Lost film
- List of lost films
