= Bess Flowers =

American actress (1898–1984)

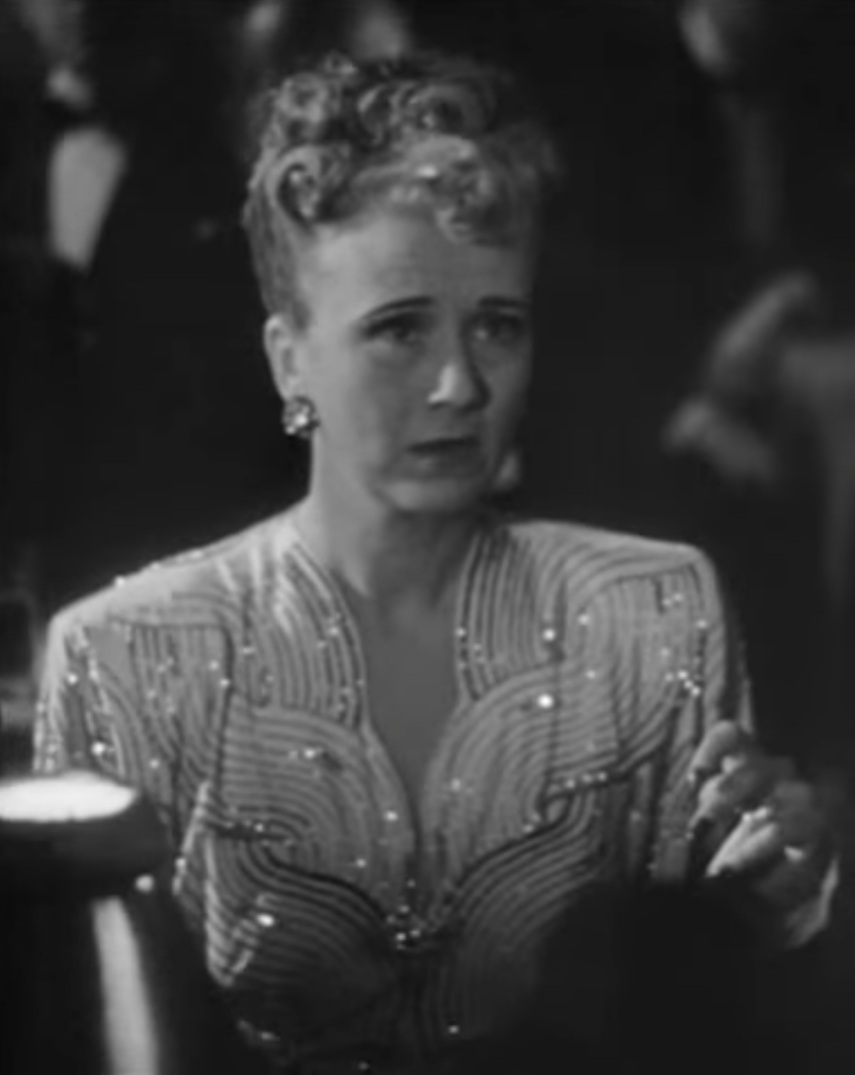
- Flowers in Song of the Thin Man (1947)
- Born: November 23, 1898; Sherman, Texas, U.S.
- Died: July 28, 1984 (aged 85); Los Angeles, California, U.S.
- Occupation: Actress
- Years active: 1923–1964
- Spouses: Cullen Tate (m. 1923; div. 1928) William S. Holman (m. 1929; div. 1930)
- Children: 1

Bess Flowers (November 23, 1898 – July 28, 1984) was an American actress best known for her work as an extra in hundreds of films. She was known as "The Queen of the Hollywood Extras," appearing in more than 350 feature films and numerous comedy shorts in her 41-year career.

She holds the record for appearances in films nominated for the Academy Award for Best Picture at 23, and is a co-record holder for appearing in eight films that won.

== Career ==
Born in Sherman, Texas, Flowers' film debut came in 1923, when she appeared in Hollywood. She made three films that year, and then began working extensively. Many of her appearances are uncredited, as she generally played non-speaking roles.

By the 1930s, Flowers was in constant demand. Her appearances ranged from Alfred Hitchcock and John Ford thrillers to comedic roles alongside Charley Chase, the Three Stooges, Leon Errol, Edgar Kennedy, and Laurel and Hardy.

Flowers appeared (unbilled) in a record eight films which won the Academy Award for Best Picture: Grand Hotel, It Happened One Night, You Can't Take It with You, Gone With the Wind, All the King's Men, All About Eve, The Greatest Show on Earth, and Around the World in 80 Days. She shares the record with fellow character actor Franklyn Farnum; Flowers and Farnum appeared together in All About Eve, The Greatest Show on Earth, and Around the World in 80 Days. Flowers appeared in twenty-three Best Picture nominees in total, making her the record holder for most appearances in films nominated for the award.

Her last movie was Good Neighbor Sam in 1964.

Flowers's acting career was not confined to feature films. She was also seen in many episodic American TV series, such as I Love Lucy, notably in episodes, "Lucy Is Enceinte" (1952), "Ethel's Birthday" (1955), and "Lucy's Night in Town" (1957), where she is usually seen as a theatre patron.

Outside her acting career, in 1945, Flowers helped to found the Screen Extras Guild (active: 1946–1992, then merged with the Screen Actors Guild), where she served as one of its first vice-presidents and recording secretaries.

== Personal life ==
Flowers was first married on September 2, 1923, in Ventura County, California, to Cullen Tate, an assistant director for Cecil B. DeMille. They had a daughter, and were divorced in 1928 in Los Angeles.

== Death ==
Flowers died on July 28, 1984, at age 85 in the Motion Picture & Television Country House and Hospital in Woodland Hills, California.

== Selected filmography ==
1920s

- Hollywood (1923) as Hortense Towers
- The Silent Partner (1923) as Mrs. Nesbit
- Irene (1926) as Jane Gilmour
- Lone Hand Saunders (1926) as Alice Mills
- Hands Across the Border (1926) as Ysabel Castro
- Glenister of the Mounted (1926) as Elizabeth Danrock
- Old Ironsides (1926) (uncredited)
- Blondes by Choice (1927) as Olga Flint
- Show People (1928) (uncredited)
- We Faw Down (1928, Short) as Mrs. Laurel
- The Saturday Night Kid (1929) as Customer (uncredited)
- Their Own Desire (1929) as Miriam the Polo Player (uncredited)

1930s

- Ten Cents a Dance (1931) as Bridge Player
- Strangers May Kiss (1931) as Diner (uncredited)
- A Free Soul (1931) as Birthday Party Guest (uncredited)
- Monkey Business (1931) as Indian's Wife (uncredited)
- Possessed (1931) as Party Guest (uncredited)
- Sinister Hands (1932) as Mary Browne
- Sin's Pay Day (1932) as Jane Webb
- It Happened One Night (1934) - Agnes, Gordon's Secretary (uncredited)
- One Exciting Adventure (1934)
- Star of Midnight (1935) as Mary Smith (uncredited)
- The Whole Town's Talking (1935) as Miss Gower, the Secretary (uncredited)
- A Night at the Opera (1935) as Ship Passenger (uncredited)
- Thicker than Water (1935, short) as Nurse (uncredited)
- Mr. Deeds Goes to Town (1936) as Party Guest (uncredited)
- Forgotten Faces (1936) as Nurse
- Two-Fisted Gentleman (1936) as Matron
- My Man Godfrey (1936) as Mrs. Merriweather (uncredited)
- Dodsworth (1936) as Ship Passenger (uncredited)
- Theodora Goes Wild (1936) as Reception Guest (uncredited)
- Topper (1937) as Nightclub Patron (uncredited)
- The Big Game (1936) as Woman at Dance
- The Awful Truth (1937) as Viola Heath (uncredited)
- Nothing Sacred (1937) as Nightclub Patron (uncredited)
- Paid to Dance (1937) as Suzy
- The Shadow (1937) as Marianne
- Ever Since Eve (1937) as Woman at Dance (uncredited)
- Termites of 1938 (1938, Short) as Mrs. Muriel Van Twitchell (uncredited)
- Holiday (1938) as Dorothy the Party Guest (uncredited)
- You Can't Take It with You (1938) as Martin's Neighbor (uncredited)
- Mutts to You (1938, Short) as Mrs. Manning
- Women in Prison (1938) as Florence
- The Lady Objects (1938) as Miriam Harper
- Midnight (1939) as Party Guest (uncredited)
- Rose of Washington Square (1939) as Dinner Guest (uncredited)
- The Roaring Twenties (1939) as Nightclub Patron (uncredited)
- Ninotchka (1939) as Gossip (uncredited)
- Gone with the Wind (1939) as Hospital Nurse (uncredited)

1940s

- A Plumbing We Will Go (1940, Short) as Mrs. Hadley (uncredited)
- The Boys from Syracuse (1940) as Woman
- Boom Town (1940) as Office Worker (uncredited)
- Mr. & Mrs. Smith (1941) as Nightclub Patron (uncredited)
- The Lady Eve (1941) as Party Guest (uncredited)
- Meet John Doe (1941) as Mattie (uncredited)
- Ziegfeld Girl (1941) as Palm Beach Casino Patron (uncredited)
- An Ache in Every Stake (1941, Short) as Mrs. Lawrence (uncredited)
- The Man Who Came to Dinner (1942) as Fan at Train Station (uncredited)
- I Married an Angel (1942) as Woman (unconfirmed)
- The Palm Beach Story (1942) as Gerry's Maid of Honor / Nightclub Extra (uncredited)
- The Glass Key (1942) (uncredited)
- Now, Voyager (1942) as Concert Audience Member (uncredited)
- I Married a Witch (1942) as Matron of Honor (uncredited)
- Springtime in the Rockies (1942) as Mrs. Jeepers (uncredited)
- Tahiti Honey (1943) as Nightclub Patron (uncredited)
- Heaven Can Wait (1943) as Party Guest (uncredited)
- Phantom Lady (1944) as Courtroom Spectator (uncredited)
- Mr. Skeffington (1944) as Mrs. Thatcher (uncredited)
- Double Indemnity (1944) as Norton's Secretary (uncredited)
- Hail the Conquering Hero (1944) as Woman at Train Station (uncredited)
- Laura (1944) as Party Guest (uncredited)
- The Woman in the Window (1944) as Bar Patron (uncredited)
- Hollywood Canteen (1944) as Hostess (uncredited)
- A Song for Miss Julie (1945) as Woman in Audience (uncredited)
- The Affairs of Susan (1945) as Party Guest (uncredited)
- Mildred Pierce (1945) as Restaurant Patron (uncredited)
- I'll Remember April (1945) as Telephone Operator (Uncredited)
- Micro-Phonies (1945) as Party Guest (cameo) (uncredited)
- Gilda (1946) Gambler at Roulette Table (uncredited)
- The Blue Dahlia (1946) as Cocktail Party Guest (uncredited)
- Notorious (1946) as Party Guest (uncredited)
- The Big Sleep (1946) as Woman with Bumped Man (uncredited)
- The Razor's Edge (1946) as Party Guest (uncredited)
- Humoresque (1946) as Boray Fan (uncredited)
- Dead Reckoning (1947) as Nightclub Patron (uncredited)
- The Farmer's Daughter (1947) as Party Guest (uncredited)
- The Bachelor and the Bobby-Soxer (1947) as Nightclub Patron (uncredited)
- The Secret Life of Walter Mitty (1947) as Illustrator (uncredited)
- Song of the Thin Man (1947) as Jessica Thayer
- Cass Timberlane (1947) as Mary Ann Milligan (uncredited)
- A Double Life (1947) as Theater Patron (uncredited)
- The Bride Goes Wild (1948) as Wedding Guest (uncredited)
- The Big Clock (1948) as Conference Room Stylist (uncredited)
- The Noose Hangs High (1948) as Fainting Psychiatrist's Patient (uncredited)
- Romance on the High Seas (1948) as Ship Passenger (uncredited)
- A Date with Judy (1948) as Nightclub Patron (uncredited)
- A Song Is Born (1948) as Nightclub Patron (uncredited)
- Neptune's Daughter (1949) as Woman at Swimsuit Show (uncredited)
- The Great Gatsby (1949) as New York Woman (uncredited)
- Mighty Joe Young (1949) as Nightclub Patron (uncredited)
- Sky Liner (1949) as Mother (uncredited)
- My Friend Irma (1949) as Gypsy Tea Room Diner (uncredited)

1950s

- Paid in Full (1950) as Saleslady in Dress Shop (uncredited)
- Young Man with a Horn (1950) as Galba's Patron (uncredited)
- No Man of Her Own (1950) as Woman at Country Club Dance (uncredited)
- The Damned Don't Cry (1950) as Nightclub Patron (uncredited)
- Father of the Bride (1950) as Wedding Reception Guest (uncredited)
- Born to Be Bad (1950) as Mrs. Worthington
- All About Eve (1950) as Sarah Siddons Awards Well-Wisher (uncredited)
- Lullaby of Broadway (1951) as Ship Passenger (uncredited)
- Show Boat (1951) as Racetrack Spectator (uncredited)
- The Greatest Show on Earth (1952) as Spectator (uncredited)
- Singin' in the Rain (1952) as Audience Member (uncredited)
- The Bad and the Beautiful (1952) as Joe's Friend at Party (uncredited)
- Angel Face (1953) as Shirley, Bennett's Secretary (uncredited)
- Murder Without Tears (1953) as Bank Customer (uncredited)
- Gentlemen Prefer Blondes (1953) as Nightclub Patron (uncredited)
- The Band Wagon (1953) as Lady on Train / Investor / Girl Hunt Ballet Extra (uncredited)
- The Robe (1953) as Trial Bystander (uncredited)
- Torch Song (1953) as Woman at Rehearsal (uncredited)
- Calamity Jane (1953) as Officer's Life in Reception Line (uncredited)
- Easy to Love (1953) as Nightclub Patron (uncredited)
- Executive Suite (1953) as Woman at Bar (uncredited)
- Dial M for Murder (1954) as Woman Departing Ship (uncredited)
- The Student Prince (1954) as Restaurant Patron (uncredited)
- Rear Window (1954) as Songwriter's Party Guest with Poodle (uncredited)
- A Star Is Born (1954) as Academy Awards Attendee (uncredited)
- White Christmas (1954) as Nightclub Patron (uncredited)
- Désirée (1954) as Lady of the Court Holding Baby (uncredited)
- Interrupted Melody (1955) as Party Guest (uncredited)
- To Catch a Thief (1955) as Woman at Costume Ball (uncredited)
- You're Never Too Young (1955) as Lobby Extra (uncredited)
- Guys and Dolls (1955) as Spectator at Hot Box Club (uncredited)
- I'll Cry Tomorrow (1955) as Nightclub Patron (uncredited)
- Alfred Hitchcock Presents (1956) (Season 1 Episode 35: "The Legacy") as Club Patron (uncredited)
- Ride the High Iron (1956) as Nightclub Patron (uncredited)
- Never Say Goodbye (1956) as Restaurant Patron (uncredited)
- Anything Goes (1956) as Ship's Passenger (uncredited)
- Giant (1956) as Guest at Banquet (uncredited)
- Around the World in 80 Days (1956) as Tourist at Bombay Baggage Check (uncredited)
- The Man Who Knew Too Much (1956) as Woman in Albert Hall (uncredited)
- Funny Face (1957) as Fashion Show Guest (uncredited)
- Designing Woman (1957) as Lady at Fashion Show (uncredited)
- Sweet Smell of Success (1957) as Patron at 21 (uncredited)
- Jailhouse Rock (1957) as Van Alden Party Guest (uncredited)
- Pal Joey (1957) as Charity Ball Guest (scenes cut)
- Witness for the Prosecution (1957) as Courtroom Spectator (uncredited)
- Alfred Hitchcock Presents (1958) (Season 3 Episode 19: "The Equalizer") as Club Patron (uncredited)
- Vertigo (1958) as Diner at Ernie's (uncredited)
- Houseboat (1958) as Country Club Patron / Wedding Guest (uncredited)
- I Married a Monster from Outer Space (1958) as Wedding Guest (uncredited)
- Alfred Hitchcock Presents (1959) (Season 4 Episode 36: "Invitation to an Accident") as Party Guest (uncredited)
- Imitation of Life (1959) as Geraldine Moore (uncredited)
- North by Northwest (1959) as Hotel Lounge Patron (uncredited)

1960s

- Please Don't Eat the Daisies (1960) as Elevator Passenger (uncredited)
- Where the Boys Are (1960) as Nightclub Patron (uncredited)
- The Absent-Minded Professor (1961) as Wedding Guest (uncredited)
- Return to Peyton Place (1961) as Townswoman at Meeting (uncredited)
- Blue Hawaii (1961) as Maile's Tourist Customer (uncredited)
- Judgment at Nuremberg (1961) as Concert Attendee (uncredited)
- Pocketful of Miracles (1961) as Pedestrian Entering Club (uncredited)
- The Notorious Landlady (1962) as Courtroom Spectator (uncredited)
- Alfred Hitchcock Presents (1962) (Season 7 Episode 17: "The Faith of Aaron Menefee") as Meeting Guest (uncredited)
- Alfred Hitchcock Presents (1962) (Season 7 Episode 27: "Act of Faith") as Bookstore Customer (uncredited)
- Sweet Bird of Youth (1962) as Finley Supporter at Rally (uncredited)
- The Manchurian Candidate (1962) as Gomel's Lady Counterpart (uncredited)
- The Alfred Hitchcock Hour (1963) (Season 1 Episode 29: "The Dark Pool") as Mrs. Pradanos
- Who's Minding the Store? (1963) as Gourmet Department Shopper (uncredited)
- Move Over, Darling (1963) as Seymour's Wife (uncredited)
- 7 Faces of Dr. Lao (1964) (uncredited)
- The Carpetbaggers (1964) as Wedding Guest (uncredited)
- Good Neighbor Sam (1964) as Mrs. Burke (uncredited)
