= Don Mike =

1927 film

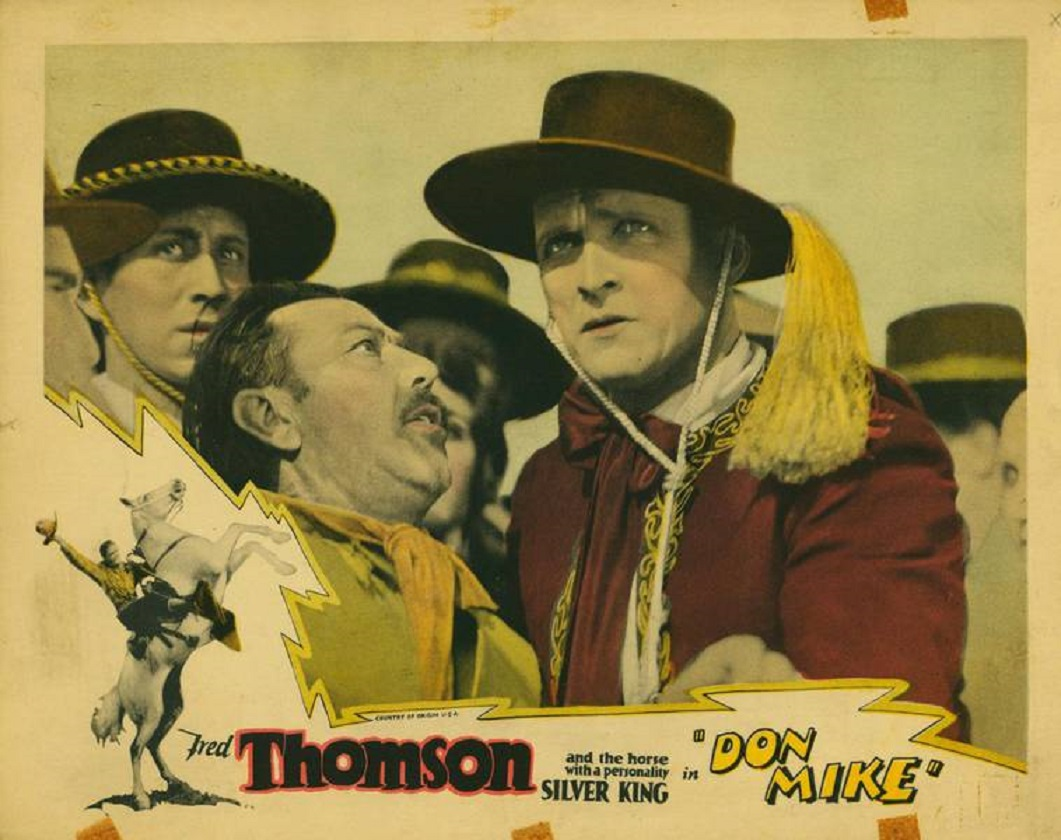
- Lobby card
- Directed by: Lloyd Ingraham
- Written by: Frances Marion; Lloyd Ingraham
- Produced by: Joseph P. Kennedy
- Starring: Fred Thomson; Ruth Clifford; Noah Young
- Cinematography: Ross Fisher
- Production company: Film Booking Offices of America
- Distributed by: Film Booking Offices of America
- Release date: January 25, 1927
- Running time: 60 minutes
- Country: United States
- Language: Silent (English intertitles)

Don Mike is a 1927 American silent Western film directed by Lloyd Ingraham and starring Fred Thomson, Ruth Clifford, and Noah Young. It is set in Old California.

== Cast ==
- Fred Thomson as Don Miguel Arguella
- Ruth Clifford as Mary Kelsey
- Noah Young as Reuben Pettigill
- Albert Prisco as Don Luis Ybara
- William Courtright as Gómez
- Tom Bates as Jason Kelsey
- Norma Marie as Dolores
- Carmen Laroux as Carmen

== Preservation ==
With no prints of Don Mike located in any film archives, it is a lost film.

== Bibliography ==
- Donald W. McCaffrey & Christopher P. Jacobs. Guide to the Silent Years of American Cinema. Greenwood Publishing, 1999.
