= The Sunset Legion =

1928 film

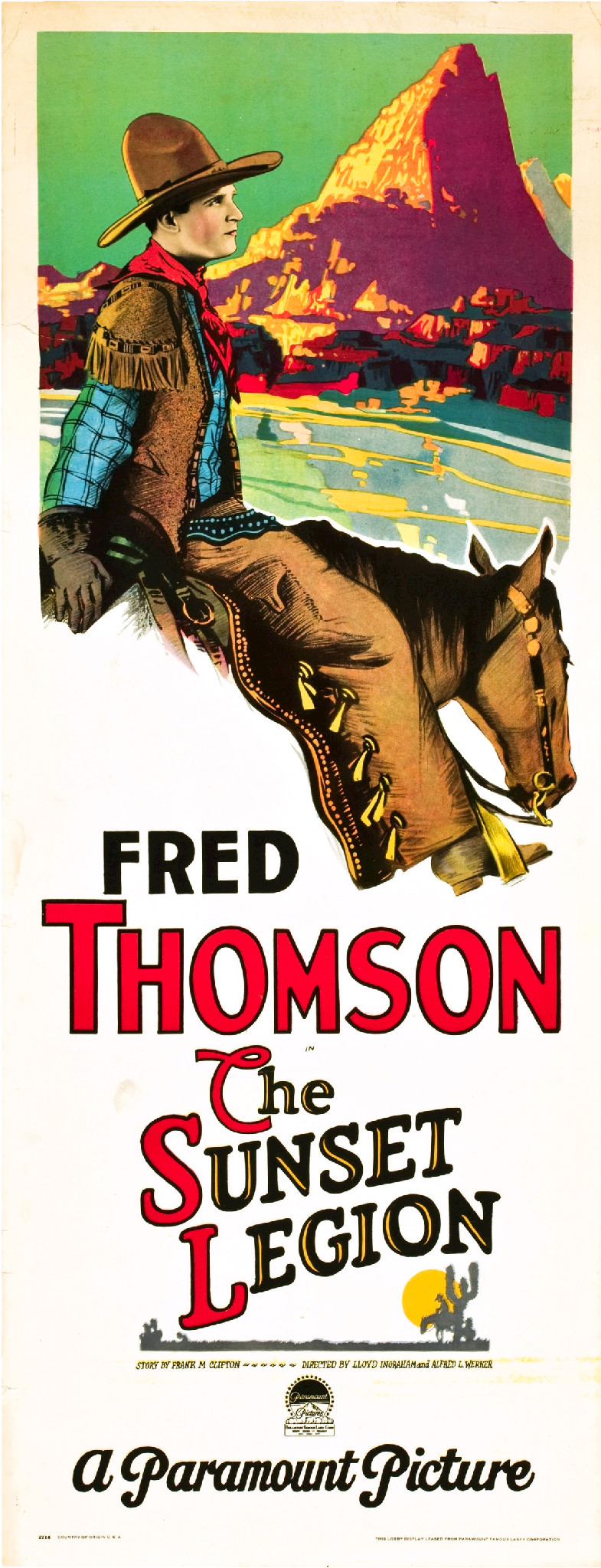
- Film poster
- Directed by: Lloyd Ingraham; Alfred L. Werker
- Screenplay by: Frances Marion; Garrett Graham
- Produced by: Jesse L. Lasky; Adolph Zukor
- Starring: Fred Thomson; Edna Murphy
- Cinematography: Mack Stengler
- Edited by: W. Duncan Mansfield
- Production company: Famous Players–Lasky Corporation
- Distributed by: Paramount Pictures
- Release date: April 21, 1928
- Running time: 70 minutes
- Country: United States
- Languages: Silent; English intertitles

The Sunset Legion is a lost 1928 American silent Western film directed by Lloyd Ingraham and Alfred L. Werker, written by Garrett Graham and Frances Marion, and starring Fred Thomson, Edna Murphy, William Courtright, and Harry Woods. It was released on April 21, 1928, by Paramount Pictures.

== Cast ==
- Fred Thomson as Masked Rider / Whittling Cowboy
- Edna Murphy as Susan
- William Courtright as Old Bill
- Harry Woods as Honest John
- Silver King the Horse as Silver
- Slim Whitaker as Bartender (uncredited)
