= A Regular Scout =

1926 film

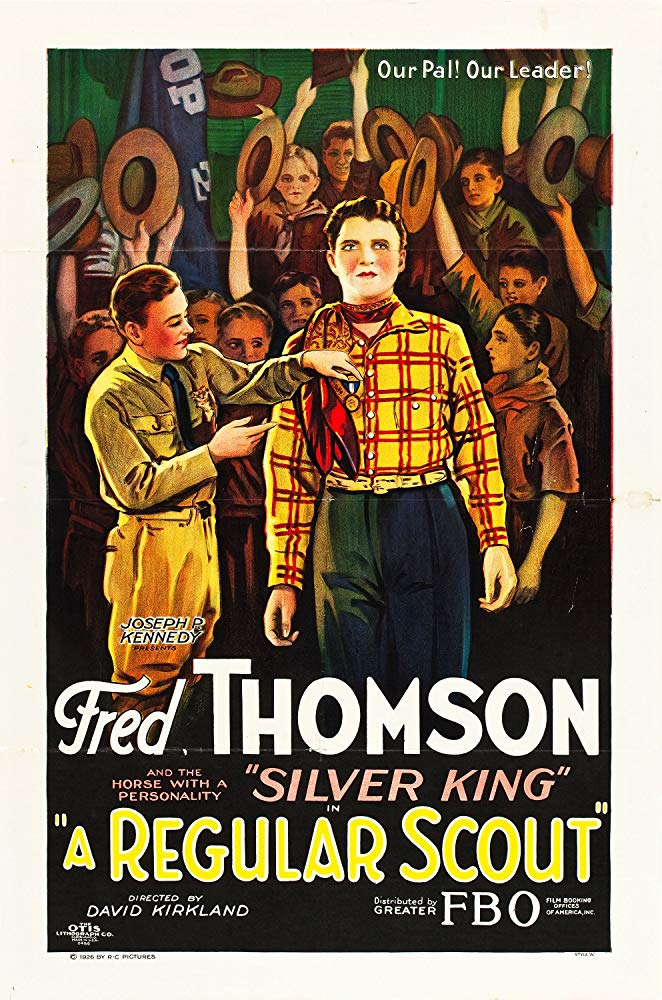
- Directed by: David Kirkland
- Written by: Buckleigh Fritz Oxford; David Kirkland
- Starring: Fred Thomson; Olive Hasbrouck; William Courtright
- Cinematography: Ross Fisher
- Production company: Film Booking Offices of America
- Distributed by: Film Booking Offices of America
- Release date: December 26, 1926
- Running time: 6 reels
- Country: United States
- Language: Silent (English intertitles)

A Regular Scout is a 1926 American silent Western film directed by David Kirkland and starring Fred Thomson, Olive Hasbrouck, and William Courtright.

== Cast ==
- Fred Thomson as Fred Blake
- Olive Hasbrouck as Olive Monroe
- William Courtright as Luke Baxter
- T. Roy Barnes as Steve Baxter
- Margaret Seddon as Mrs. Monroe
- Buck Black as Buddy Monroe
- Robert McKim as Ed Powell
- Harry Woods as Scar Stevens

== Bibliography ==
- Donald W. McCaffrey & Christopher P. Jacobs. Guide to the Silent Years of American Cinema. Greenwood Publishing, 1999. ISBN 0-313-30345-2
