= Silver Comes Through =

1927 film

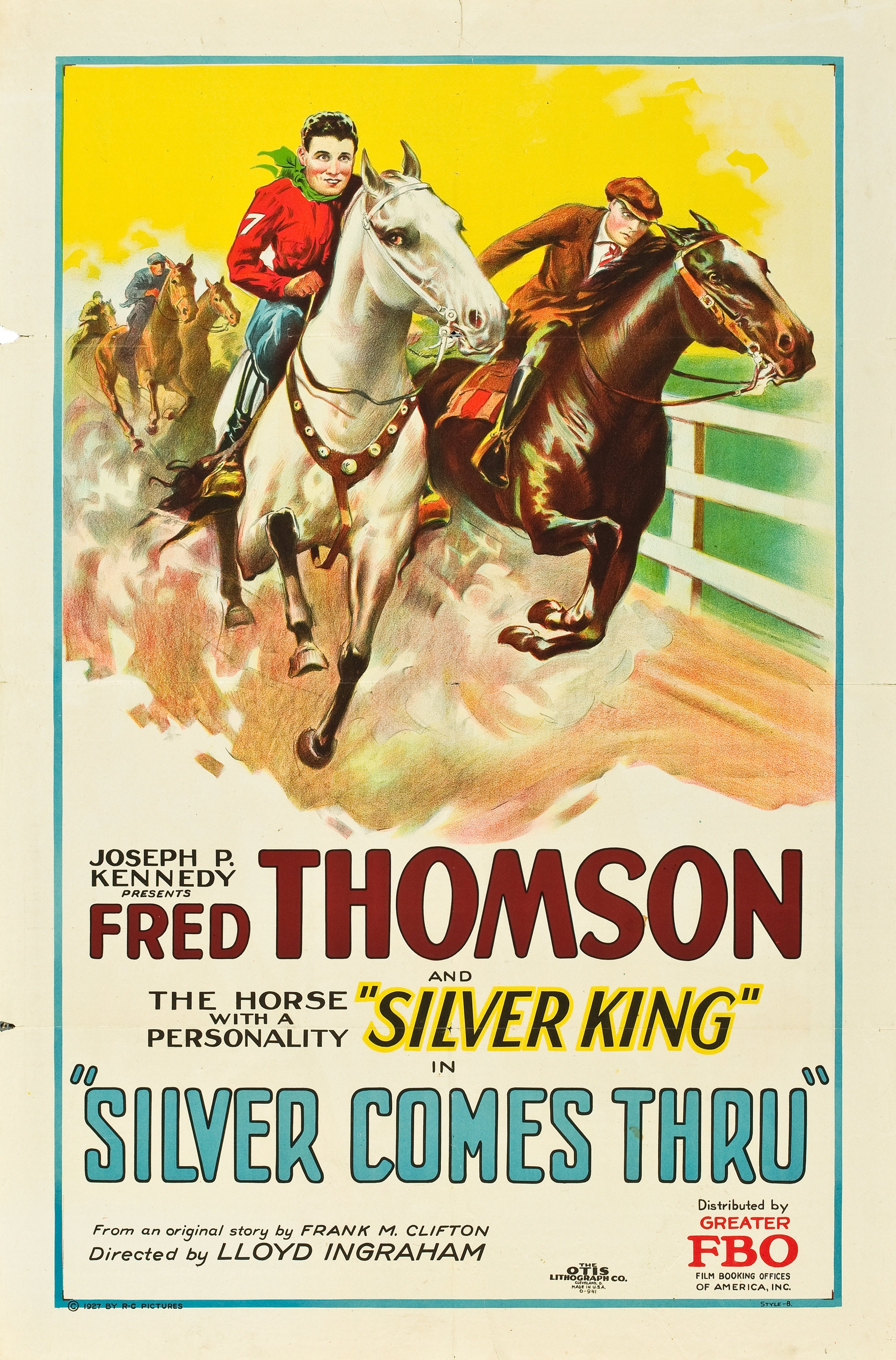
- Theatrical poster
- Directed by: Lloyd Ingraham
- Written by: Frances Marion; Lloyd Ingraham
- Produced by: Joseph P. Kennedy
- Starring: Fred Thomson; Edna Murphy; William Courtright
- Cinematography: Mack Stengler
- Production company: Film Booking Offices of America
- Distributed by: Film Booking Offices of America
- Release date: May 29, 1927
- Running time: 6 reels
- Country: United States
- Language: Silent (English intertitles)

Silver Comes Through is a 1927 American silent Western film directed by Lloyd Ingraham and starring Fred Thomson, Edna Murphy, and William Courtright.

== Cast ==
- Fred Thomson as Fred
- Edna Murphy as Lucindy
- William Courtright as Zeke
- Harry Woods as Stanton
- Mathilde Brundage as Mrs. Bryce-Collins
- Silver King the Horse as Silver, Fred's Horse

== Bibliography ==
- Donald W. McCaffrey & Christopher P. Jacobs. Guide to the Silent Years of American Cinema. Greenwood Publishing, 1999. ISBN 0-313-30345-2
