= That Devil Quemado =

1925 film

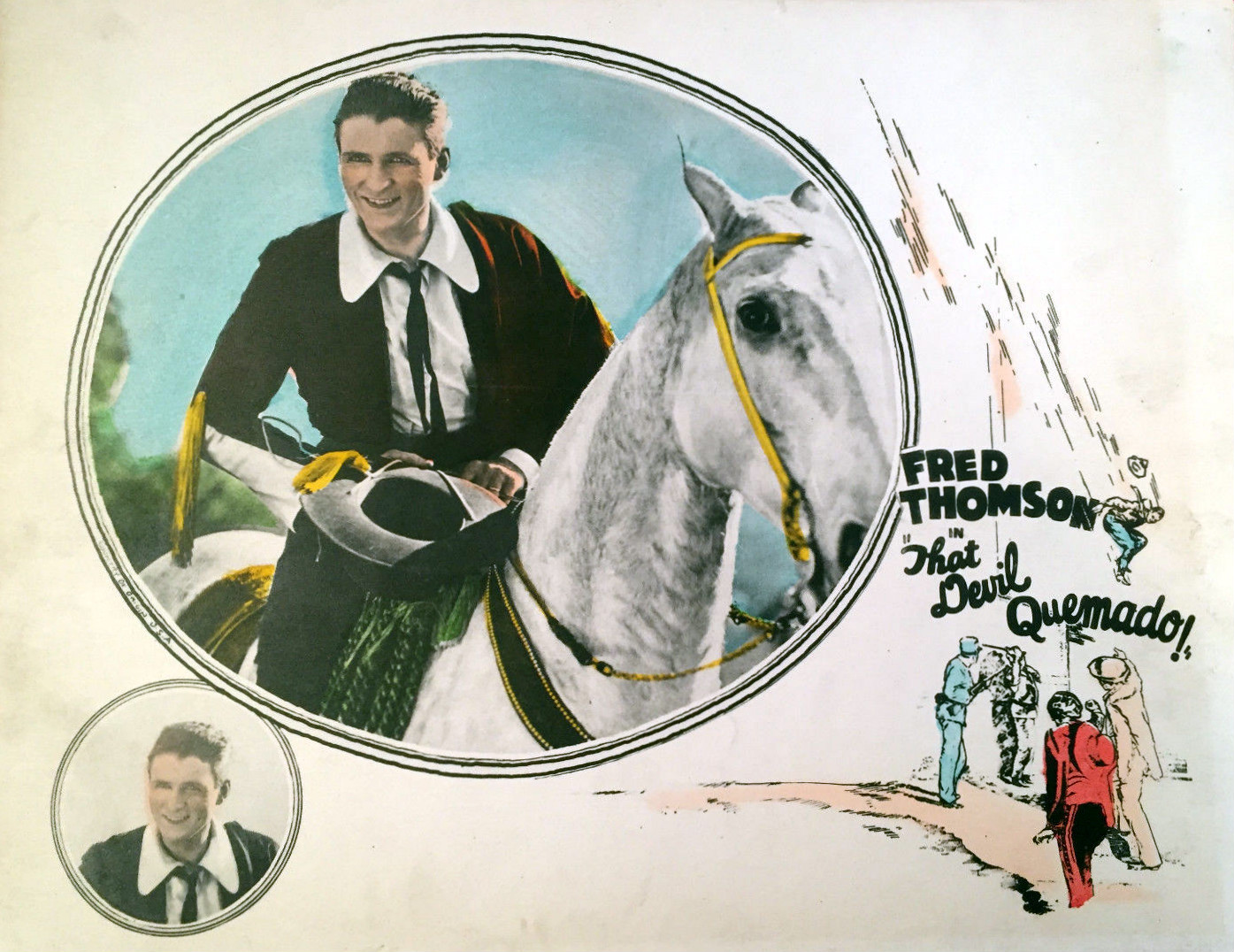
- Lobby card
- Directed by: Del Andrews
- Written by: Marvin Wilhite
- Starring: Fred Thomson; Albert Prisco; Nola Luxford
- Cinematography: Ross Fisher
- Production company: Robertson-Cole Pictures Corporation
- Distributed by: Film Booking Offices of America
- Release date: April 5, 1925
- Running time: 5 reels
- Country: United States
- Languages: Silent; English intertitles

That Devil Quemado is a 1925 American silent Western film directed by Del Andrews and starring Fred Thomson, Albert Prisco, and Nola Luxford.

== Plot ==
As described in a film magazine review, Quemado is a daring, mysterious character who kidnaps any woman he wants in the little border town of Sonora. He meets Joanna Thatcher, daughter of a wealthy Easterner, and kidnaps her, too. She falls madly in love with him and, after he cleverly saves one of his henchmen from death, discovers that Quemado is a former classmate of one of her brothers.

== Cast ==
- Fred Thomson as Quemado
- Albert Prisco as José Ramériz
- Nola Luxford as Conchita Ramériz
- Byron Douglas as John Thatcher
- Joseph Bell as Ned Thatcher
- Gloria Hope as Joanna Thatcher
- Alan Roscoe as Gretorix
- Robert Cauterio as Juan Gonzales

== Preservation ==
An incomplete copy of the film survives in the hands of a private collector.

== Bibliography ==
- Munden, Kenneth White. The American Film Institute Catalog of Motion Pictures Produced in the United States, Part 1. University of California Press, 1997.
