= The Love Light =

1921 film directed by Frances Marion

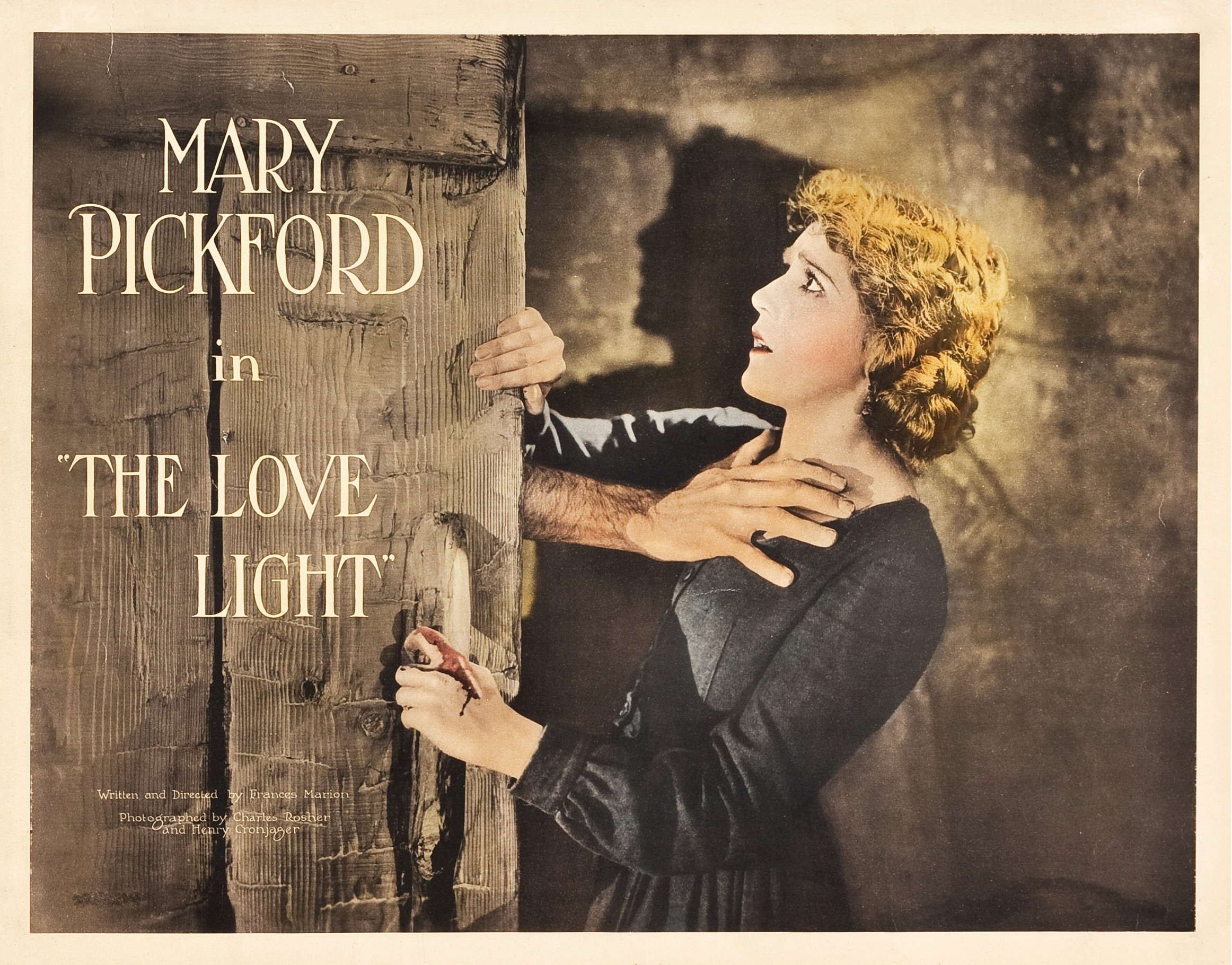
- Theatrical release poster
- Directed by: Frances Marion
- Written by: Frances Marion
- Produced by: Mary Pickford
- Starring: Mary Pickford; Evelyn Dumo
- Cinematography: Charles Rosher; Henry Cronjager
- Edited by: Stuart Heisler
- Distributed by: United Artists
- Release date: January 9, 1921
- Running time: 89 minutes (Alternate version)
- Country: United States
- Language: Silent (English intertitles)
- Box office: $690,695

The Love Light

The Love Light is a 1921 American silent drama film starring Mary Pickford. The film was written and directed by Frances Marion. Pickford selected the story as she wanted to play an adult and not another adolescent role.

The film is mistakenly referred to as Straight Is the Way in publicity.

== Plot ==
Based upon a summary in a film publication, Angela (Pickford), an Italian girl, bids good-bye to her second brother, who is the youngest, as he goes off to join the troops. Then comes news that her older brother has been killed in the war. Giovanni (Bloomer), who loves Angela, tries to comfort her, and then he too is called. Left alone, Angela is made keeper of the lighthouse. Joseph (Thomson) arrives and says that he is an American and a deserter. They are later secretly married. One night he has Angela flash him a "love" signal using the lighthouse. The next morning an Italian ship carrying wounded men is reported as having been destroyed at midnight, the hour when the signal was sent. Angela steals some chocolate from Tony (Regas) for Joseph to take with him. When she arrives home, she hears Joseph murmur in his sleep "Gott mit uns," and it dawns on her that her husband is a German spy. Tony traces the theft to her, and after he says that her wounded brother had been on the ship, she realizes that it was the signal that sent her brother to his death. She gives up Joseph, who still proclaims his love for her. Joseph breaks away from his jailers and plunges over a cliff to his death. Later, with her and Joseph's baby, Angela is happy with her old sweetheart Giovanni, who has returned from the war blind.

== Cast ==
- Mary Pickford as Angela Carlotti
- Evelyn Dumo as Maria
- Raymond Bloomer as Giovanni
- Fred Thomson as Joseph
- Albert Prisco as Pietro
- George Regas as Tony
- Eddie Phillips as Mario Carlotti
- Jean De Briac as Antonio Carlotti

== Reception ==
Photoplay published a very critical review by Burns Mantle. He wrote, in summary, "The Love Light is a poor picture in the sense of being quite unworthy of the star's talents. The story is developed without reasonable logic and filmed with only the value of the pictures in mind. The Love Light's one value to my mind is that it takes the nation's sweetheart out of curls and short frocks and makes a woman of her."

== See also ==
- Mary Pickford filmography
