= The Two-Gun Man =

1926 film

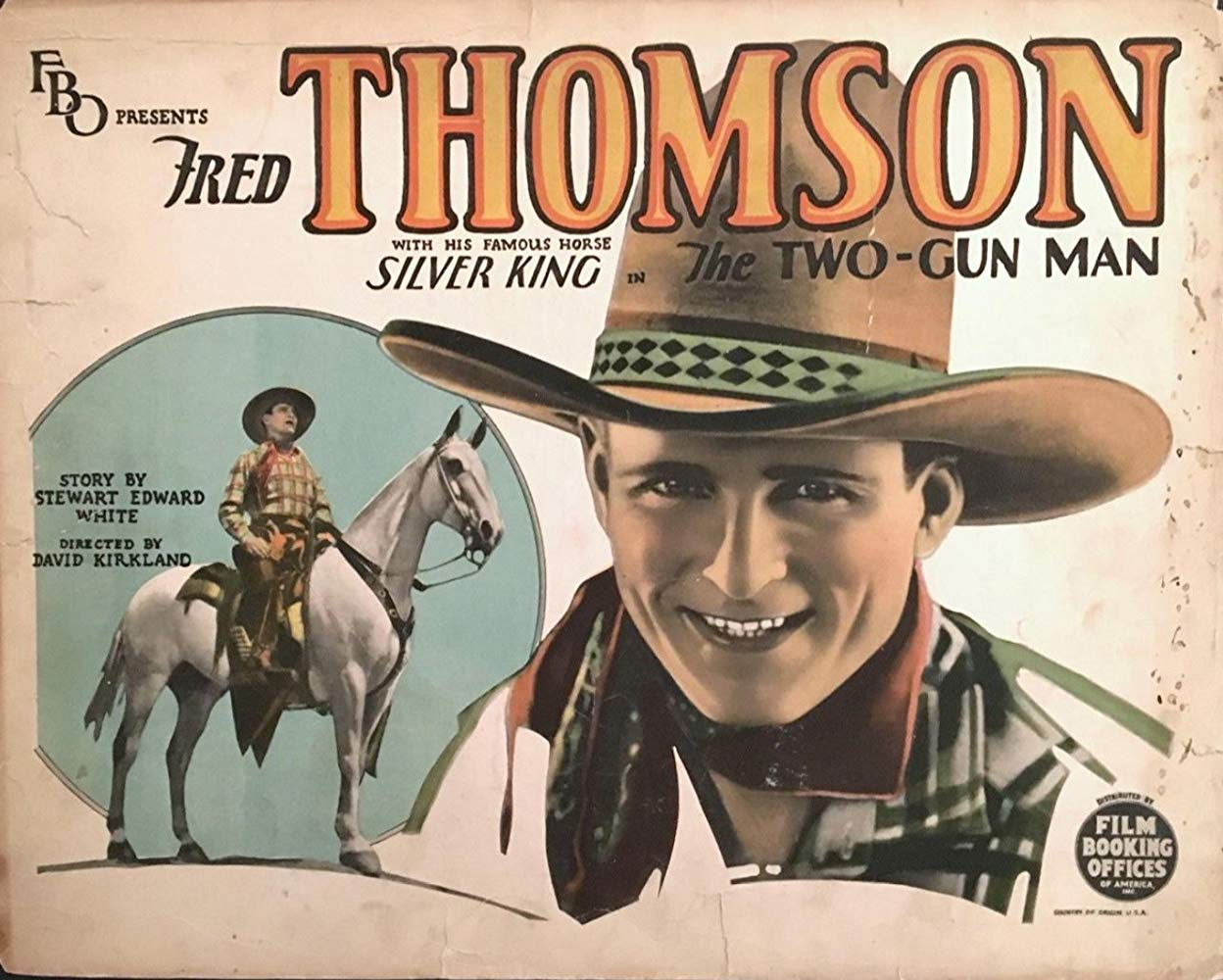
- Lobby card
- Directed by: David Kirkland
- Written by: Frances Marion; Stewart Edward White; William E. Wing
- Produced by: Joseph P. Kennedy
- Starring: Fred Thomson; Spottiswoode Aitken; Olive Hasbrouck
- Cinematography: Ross Fisher
- Production company: Film Booking Offices of America
- Distributed by: Film Booking Offices of America
- Release date: June 13, 1926
- Running time: 5 reels
- Country: United States
- Language: Silent (English intertitles)

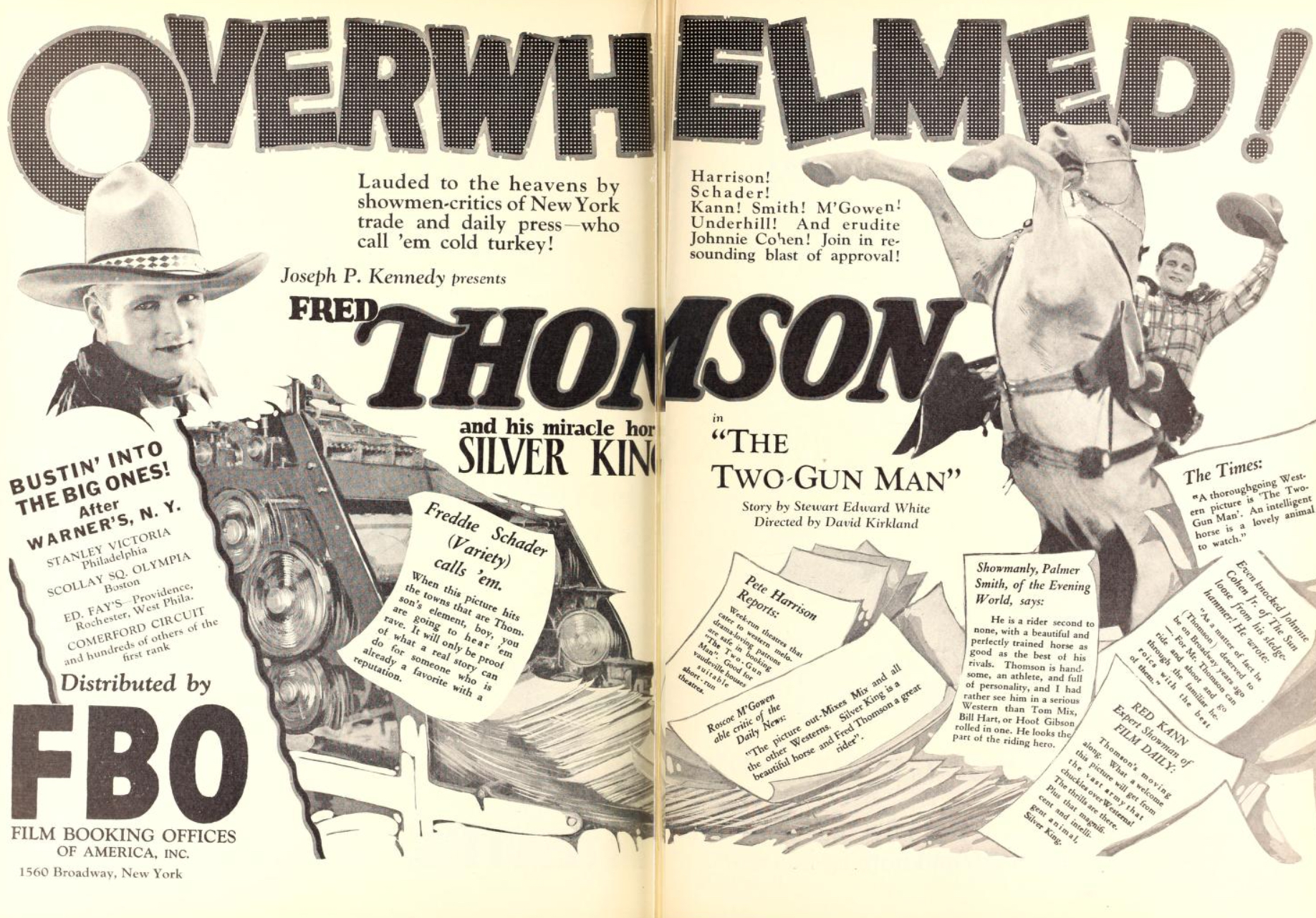
The Two-Gun Man ad in Motion Picture News, 1926

The Two-Gun Man is a 1926 American silent Western film directed by David Kirkland and starring Fred Thomson, Spottiswoode Aitken, and Olive Hasbrouck. Only reel 2 of this film is known to have survived as of now.

== Plot ==
A returning World War I veteran, Dean learns his father is having trouble with cattle rustlers and mortgage payments. The problems take their toll on his father and he passes away. He vows vengeance, however, a woman he rescued from an ambusher persuades him against murder. Instead, he steals back his cattle from the thieves and sells them to the chief rustler before turning over the gang to the sheriff.

== Cast ==
- Fred Thomson as Dean Randall
- Spottiswoode Aitken as Dad Randall
- Sheldon Lewis as Ivor Johnson
- Frank Hagney as Bowie Bill
- Ivor McFadden as Texas Pete
- Olive Hasbrouck as Grace Stickley
- William Courtright as Dad Stickley
- Billy Butts as Billy Stickley
- Arthur Millett as Sheriff Dalton
- Willie Fung as Quong

== Bibliography ==
- Donald W. McCaffrey & Christopher P. Jacobs. Guide to the Silent Years of American Cinema. Greenwood Publishing, 1999. ISBN 0-313-30345-2
