= Jesse James (1927 film) =

1927 film

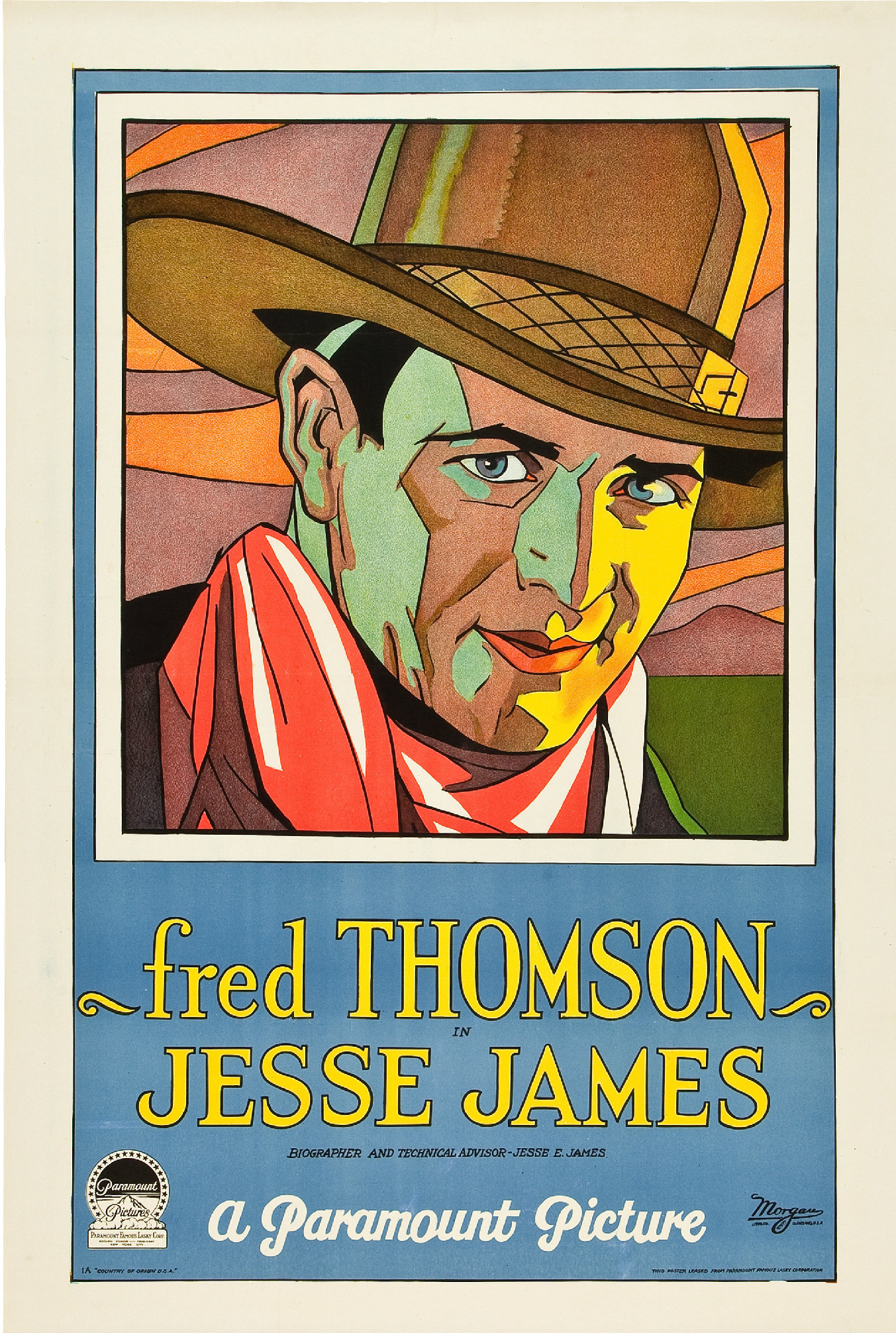
- Lobby poster
- Directed by: Lloyd Ingraham
- Written by: Frances Marion (story & scenario) (as Frank M. Clifton)
- Produced by: Adolph Zukor; Jesse L. Lasky
- Starring: Fred Thomson
- Cinematography: Allen Siegler
- Distributed by: Paramount Pictures
- Release date: October 15, 1927
- Running time: 80 minutes; 8 reels (8,656 feet)
- Country: United States
- Languages: Silent; English intertitles
- Box office: $1.2 million

Jesse James is a 1927 American silent Western film produced by Adolph Zukor and Jesse L. Lasky and released through Paramount Pictures. The film was directed by Lloyd Ingraham and starred cowboy star Fred Thomson whose wife Frances Marion wrote the scenario under the nom de plume Frank M. Clifton.

The film was a light approach on the life of the famous outlaw Jesse James and was not popular with a large segment of the audience. Jesse E. James, the outlaw's son, served as technical advisor on the film.

== Cast ==
- Fred Thomson as Jesse James
- Nora Lane as Zerelda Mimms
- Montagu Love as Frederick Mimms
- Mary Carr as Mrs. Zerelda Samuels
- James Pierce as Frank James
- Harry Woods as Bob Ford
- William Courtright as Parson Bill
- Silver King the Horse as Fred Thomson's steed
- Ruby Fornes (uncredited)
- Johnny Downs as Jesse James as a boy (uncredited)

== Censorship ==
When Jesse James was released, many states and cities in the United States had censor boards that could require cuts or other eliminations before the film could be shown. The Kansas censor board ordered a cut of the intertitle "If this is justice durned if I'll be a preacher any longer."

== Preservation ==
Both IMDb and Lost Film Files have this film as being a lost film while silentera.com states that "a print exists".
