= All Around Frying Pan =

1925 film

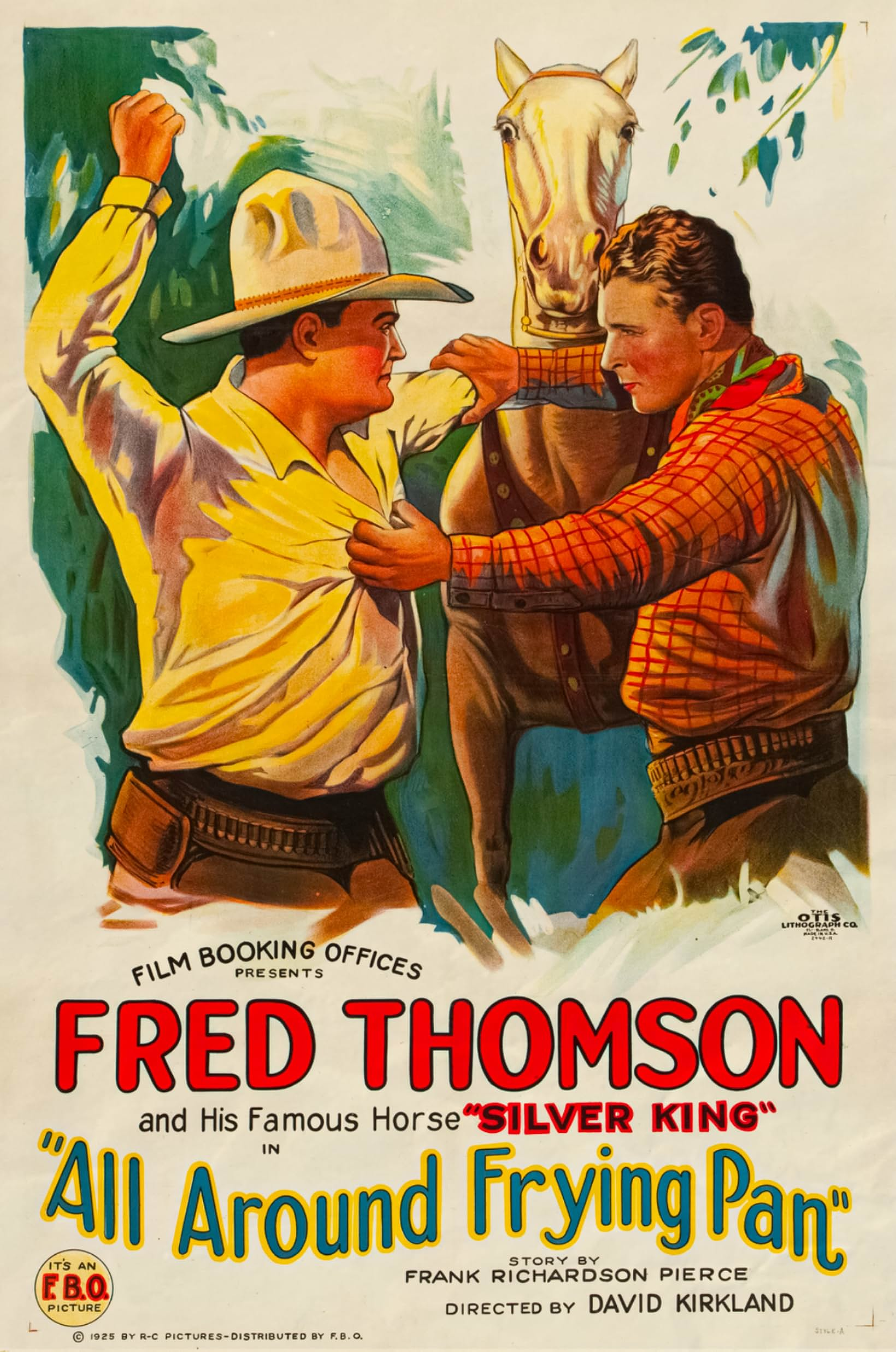
- Poster
- Directed by: David Kirkland
- Written by: David Kirkland; Frank Richardson Pierce
- Starring: Fred Thomson; James A. Marcus; Clara Horton
- Cinematography: Ross Fisher
- Production company: Robertson-Cole Pictures Corporation
- Distributed by: Film Booking Offices of America
- Release date: November 8, 1925
- Running time: 1 hour
- Country: United States
- Language: Silent (English intertitles)

All Around Frying Pan is a lost 1925 American silent Western film directed by David Kirkland and starring Fred Thomson, James A. Marcus, and Clara Horton.

== Plot ==
Bart Andrews is a drifting cowboy who is arrested for vagrancy by a sheriff in need of men for the state rad gang. The sheriff stops off at a rodeo on the way to the jail. At the rodeo, Bart has an opportunity to ride a wild bronc, and he tames the horse. At the urging of some cowboys, the sheriff allows Bart to go to work on the Lawrence ranch. Bart falls in love with Jean Dawson, the daughter of ranch manager Jim Dawson.

Bart prevents the theft of the trainload of cattle, and later surprises the foreman in the act of robbing the safe at the express office. In the ensuing fight, the station agent is killed, and Bart is accused of the crime. Bart frees himself, brings the foreman to justice, and reveals himself to be the real owner of the Lawrence ranch.

== Cast ==
- Fred Thomson as Bart Andrews
- James A. Marcus as Sheriff
- William Courtright as All Around Austin
- John Lince as Jim Dawson
- Clara Horton as Jean Dawson
- Monte Collins as Mike Selby
- Elmo Lincoln as Foreman Slade
- Newton Barbar as Ruddy Logan

== Preservation ==
With no holdings located in archives, All Around Frying Pan is considered a lost film.

== Production ==
All Around Frying Pan was one of several Westerns that Fred Thomson made for FBO, most of which included his white horse, Silver King.
