= Hands Across the Border (1926 film) =

1926 film

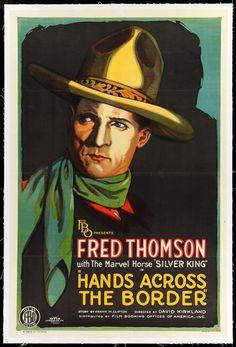
- Directed by: David Kirkland
- Written by: Frances Marion; William E. Wing; Malcolm Stuart Boylan
- Starring: Fred Thomson; Bess Flowers; Tyrone Power Sr.
- Cinematography: Ross Fisher
- Production company: Robertson-Cole Pictures Corporation
- Distributed by: Film Booking Offices of America
- Release date: May 1, 1926
- Running time: 60 minutes
- Country: United States
- Language: Silent (English intertitles)

Hands Across the Border is a 1926 American silent Western film directed by David Kirkland and starring Fred Thomson, Bess Flowers, and Tyrone Power Sr.

== Plot ==
As described in a film magazine review, Ted Drake is the son of a wealthy man, and his father John sends him to Mexico to assist government officials using a ranch owned by his father to clean-up a band of smugglers. He rescues Ysabel, the daughter of Don Castro, from some kidnappers. To get her on a departing train on time, Ted rides through a crowd in front of the train station. In rapid succession he has a number of narrow escapes. To gather evidence Ted impersonates one of the desperados. However, he is captured and put in front of a firing squad. His wonder horse Silver King sets off an explosion which brings the American cavalry across the boarder, arriving just in time to prevent the death of Ted. The cavalry rounds up the smugglers. It turns out that the Don is actually a secret service man, which allows Ted's romance of Ysabel to continue.

== Cast ==
- Fred Thomson as Ted Drake
- Bess Flowers as Ysabel Castro
- Tyrone Power Sr. as John Drake
- William Courtright as Grimes
- Clarence Geldart as Don Castro
- Tom Santschi as Breen

== Film Images ==
As a lost film not many images survive. Below is a collection of lobby cards, stills, and other imagery from the film that exists.

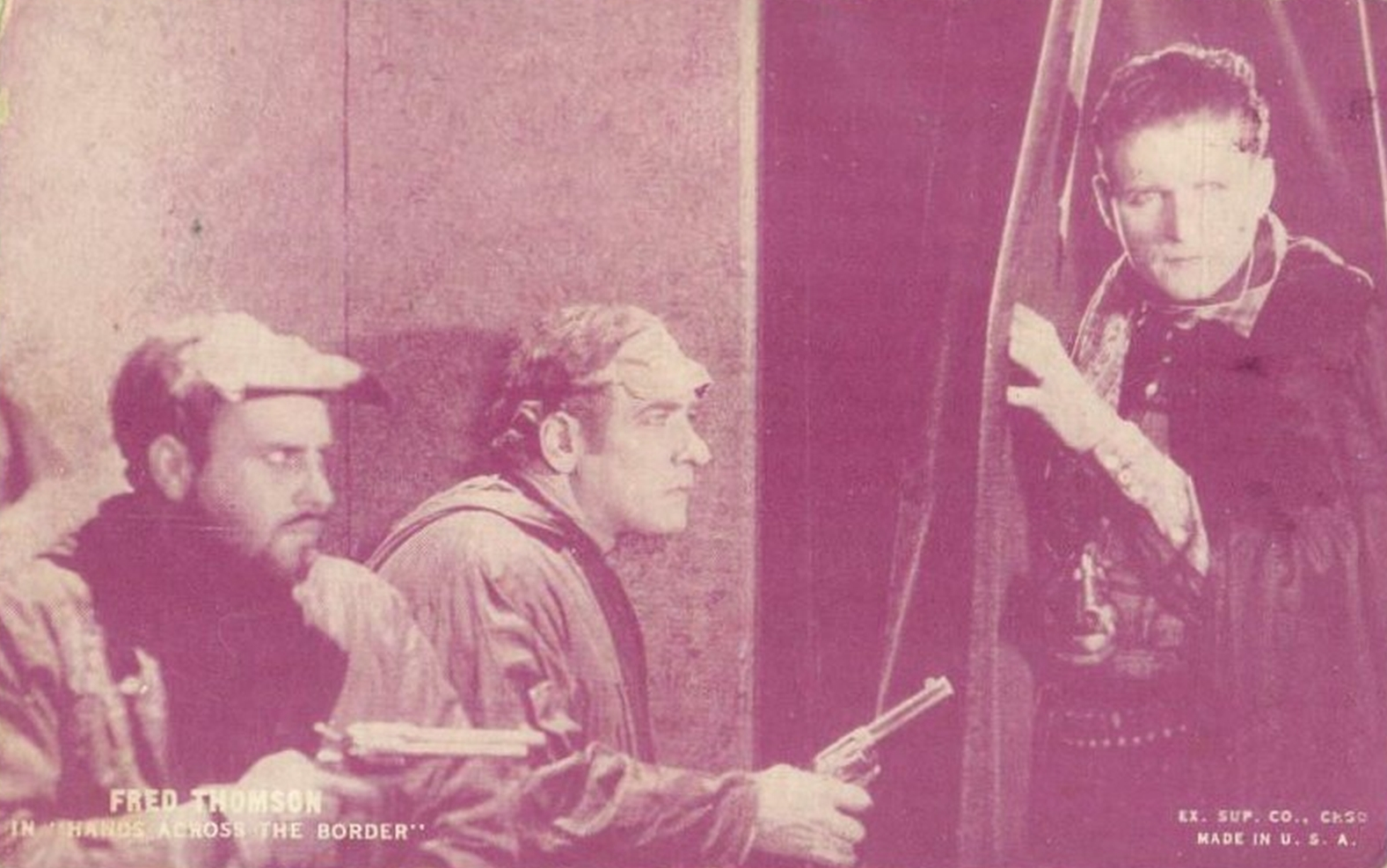
Still

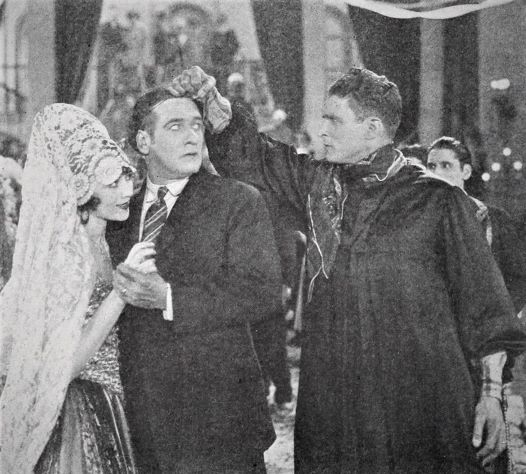
Still

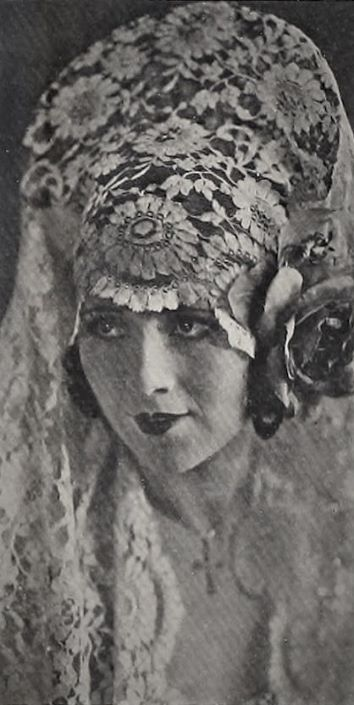
Still

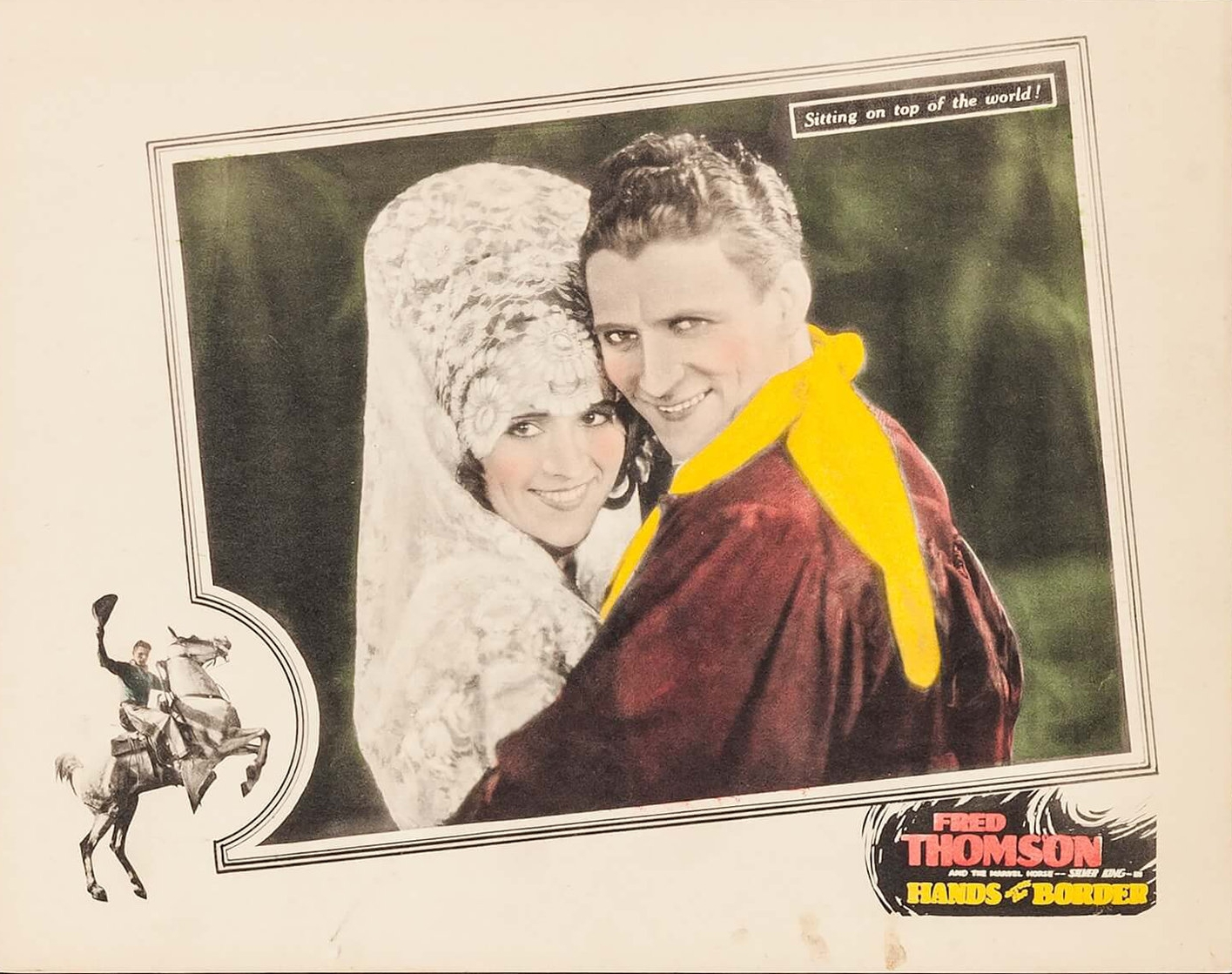
Lobby card

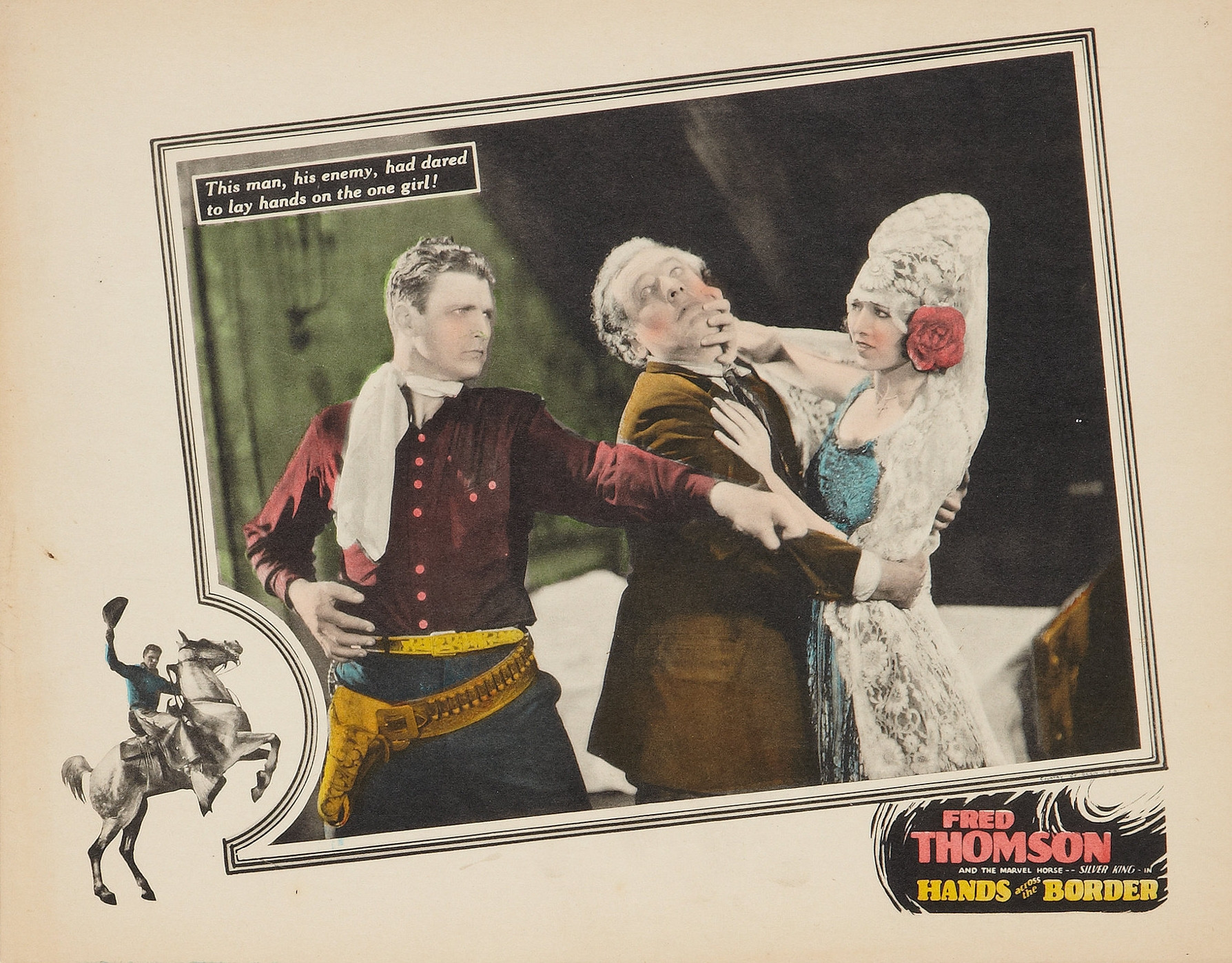
Lobby card

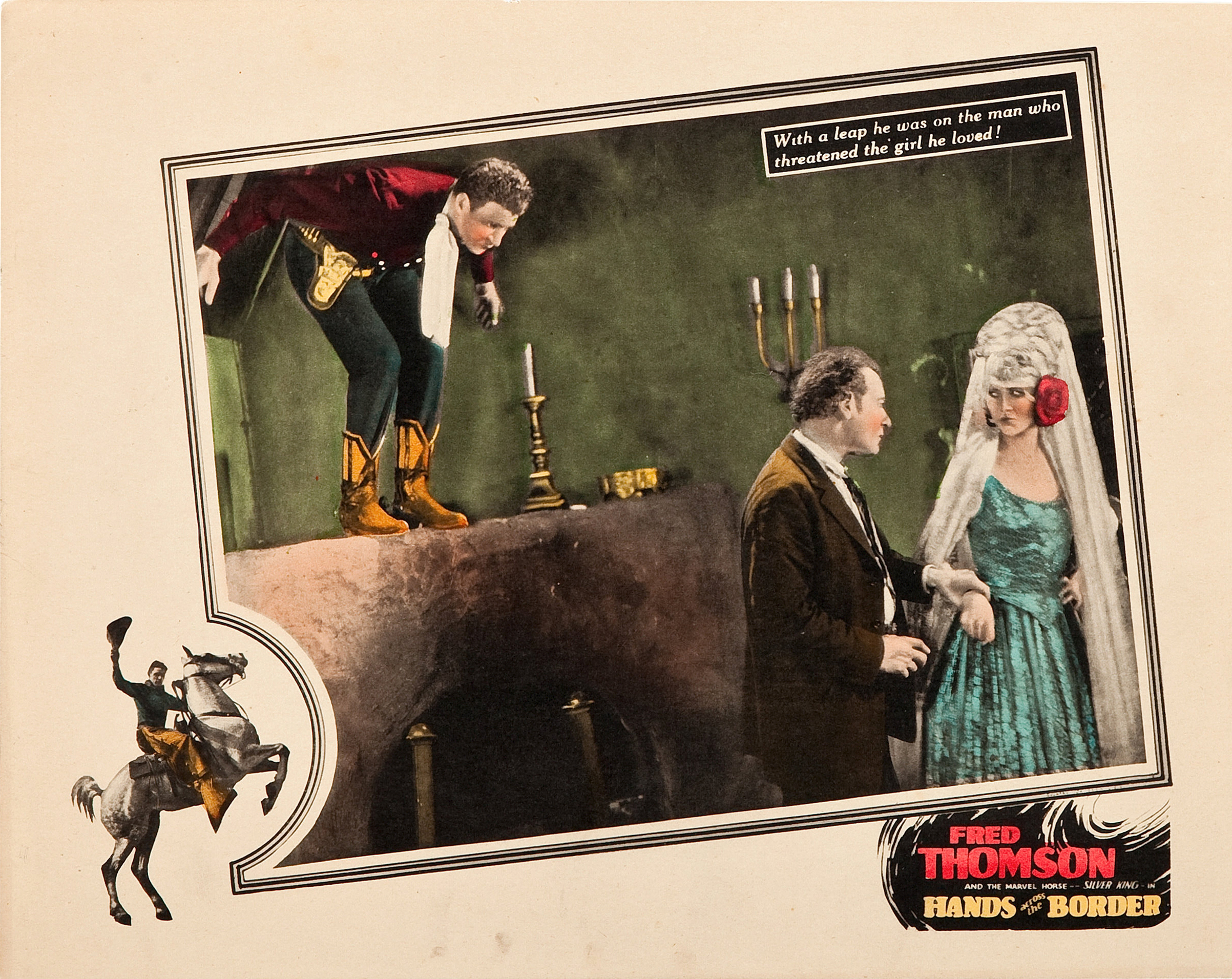
Lobby card
