= The Wild Bull's Lair =

1925 film directed by Del Andrews

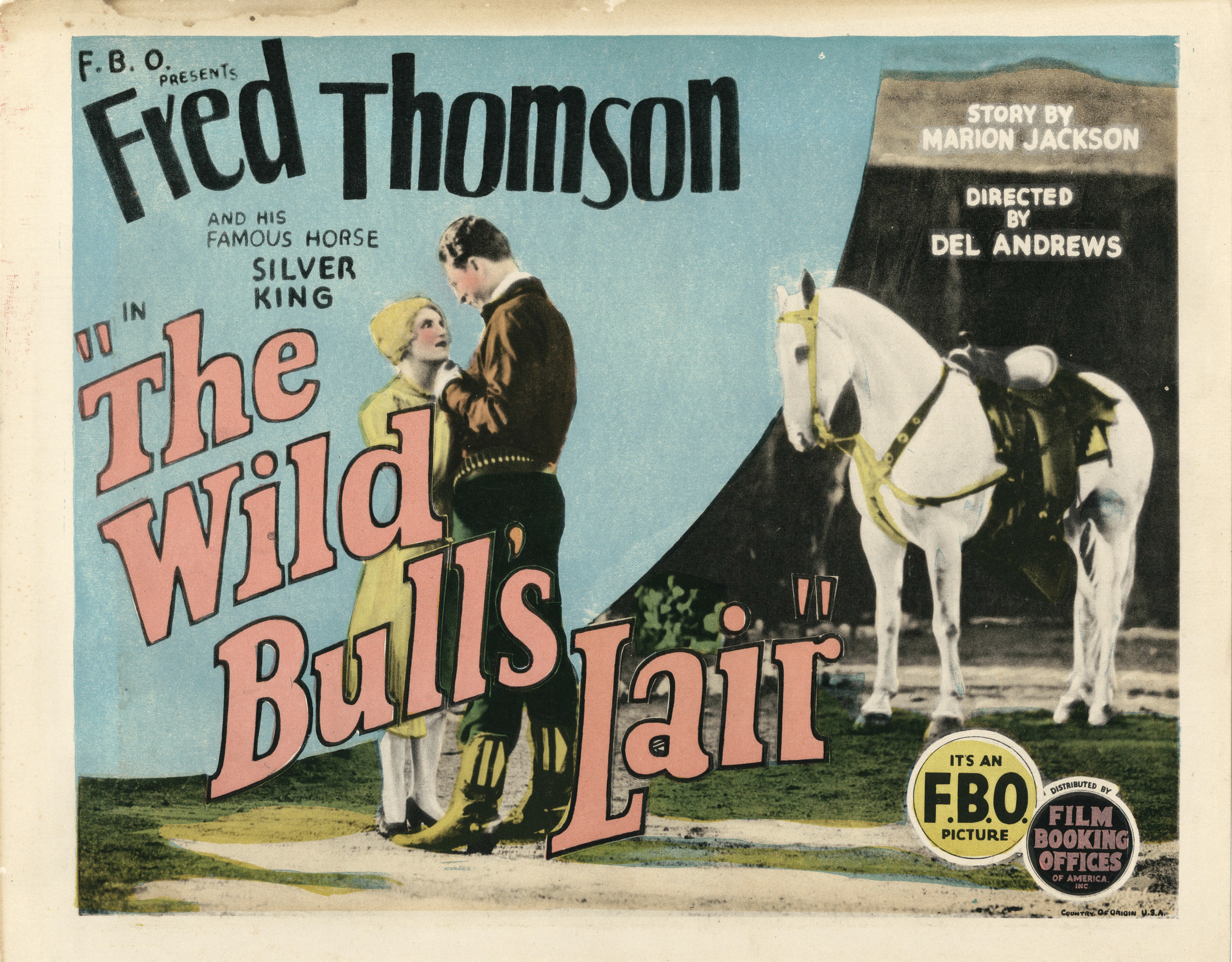
- Directed by: Del Andrews
- Written by: Marion Jackson
- Starring: Fred Thomson; Catherine Bennett; Herbert Prior
- Cinematography: Ross Fisher
- Production company: Film Booking Offices of America
- Distributed by: Film Booking Offices of America
- Release date: June 28, 1925
- Running time: 60 minutes
- Country: United States
- Language: Silent (English intertitles)

The Wild Bull's Lair is a 1925 American silent Western film directed by Del Andrews and starring Fred Thomson, Catherine Bennett, and Herbert Prior.

== Plot ==
As described in a film magazine reviews, James Harbison obtains a wild animal which is the result of the crossed strain of a bison and a wild bull. When it escapes from him, Eagle Eye, an American Indian, leads the animal to Skull Mountain through a secret passage. Soon there is a rumor that the mountain is inhabited by a supernatural beast which rustles the cattle. Dan Allen is kept from investigating the gossip by his horse, Silver King, who refuses to go near the mountain. Henry Harbison is killed by the animal in the mountain. Eagle Eye comes to Henry’s father with word that he has found the lair of the beast. Old Harbison follows the Indian to a lonely spot where the latter commands him to consent to the marriage of himself and Eleanor Harbison, daughter of the ranger. When Harbison refuses to let his daughter marry an Indian, the latter threatens to turn loose the bull and let the man be gored to death. By terror the Indian succeeds in compelling Harbison to sign a note requesting his daughter to come to the spot. As he approaches, Eagle Eye is about to turn the bull loose on Harbison. Dan appears in time to seize the bull and, by sheer strength, to throw it on its back and save Eleanor and her father.

== Cast ==
- Fred Thomson as Dan Allen
- Catherine Bennett as Eleanor Harbison
- Herbert Prior as James Harbison
- Thomas Carr as Henry Harbison
- Frank Hagney as Eagle Eye
- Frank Abbott as Yuma

== Bibliography ==
- Donald W. McCaffrey & Christopher P. Jacobs. Guide to the Silent Years of American Cinema. Greenwood Publishing, 1999. ISBN 0-313-30345-2
