= Lloyd Ingraham =

American actor and director (1874–1956)

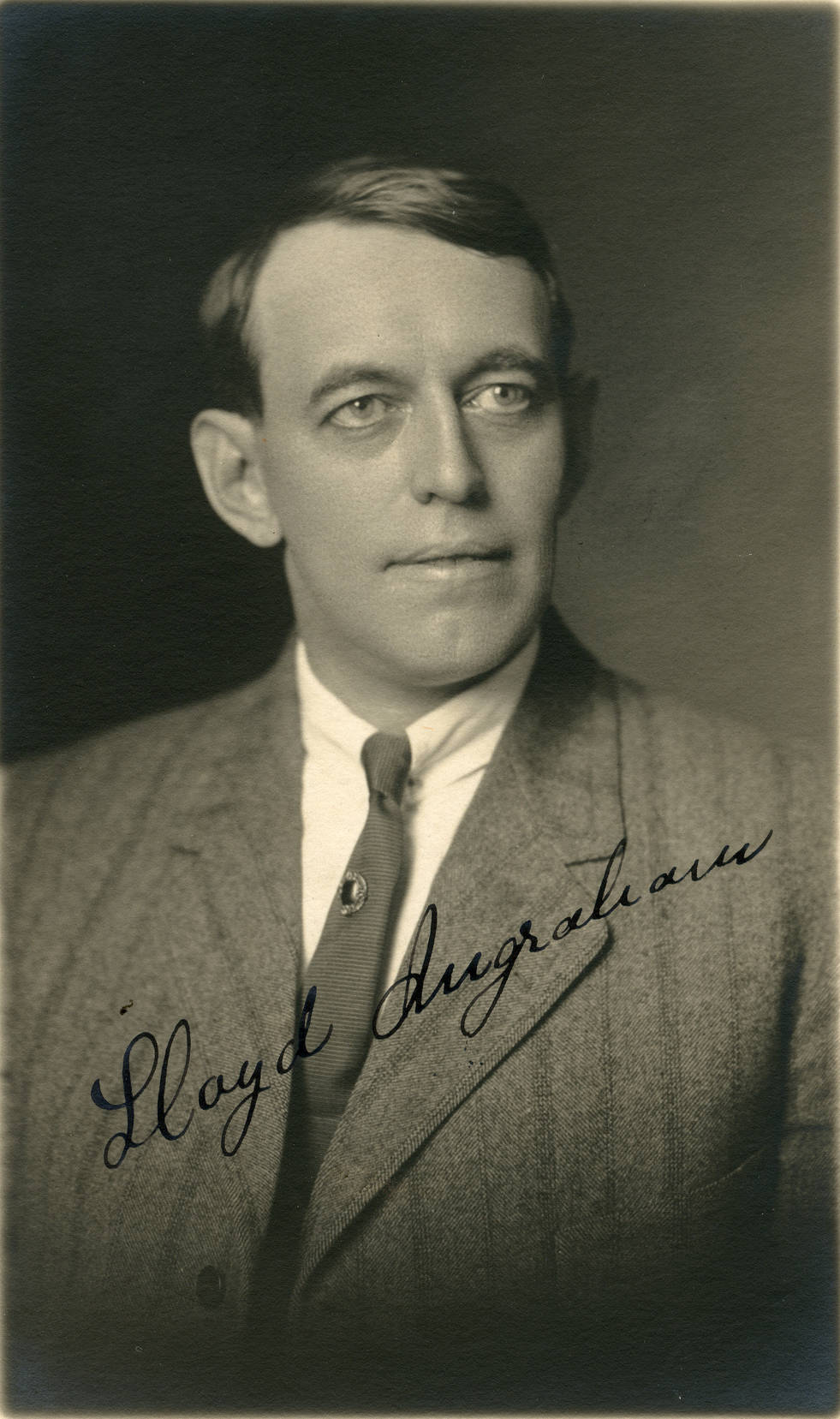
- Ingraham in 1911
- Born: Lloyd Chauncey Ingraham; November 30, 1874; Rochelle, Illinois, U.S.
- Died: April 4, 1956 (aged 81); Los Angeles, California, U.S.
- Occupations: Actor, film director
- Years active: 1912–1950
- Spouse: Maude May Plopper (1905–1956) (his death) (2 children)
- Children: 1

Lloyd Chauncey Ingraham (November 30, 1874 – April 4, 1956) was an American film actor and director.

== Biography ==
Born in Rochelle, Illinois, Ingraham appeared in more than 280 films between 1912 and 1950, as well as directing more than 100 films between 1913 and 1930. Films for which he is known include Scaramouche (1923), The Padrone's Ward (1914) and Rainbow Valley (1935). He performed in several films with John Wayne including Rainbow Valley (1935), Empty Saddles (1936), Westward Ho (1935), The Lonely Trail (1936) and Conflict (1936).

He died of pneumonia in the Motion Picture Hospital at Woodland Hills, Los Angeles, California, aged 81. His remains are buried in Chapel of the Pines Crematory.

== Selected filmography ==
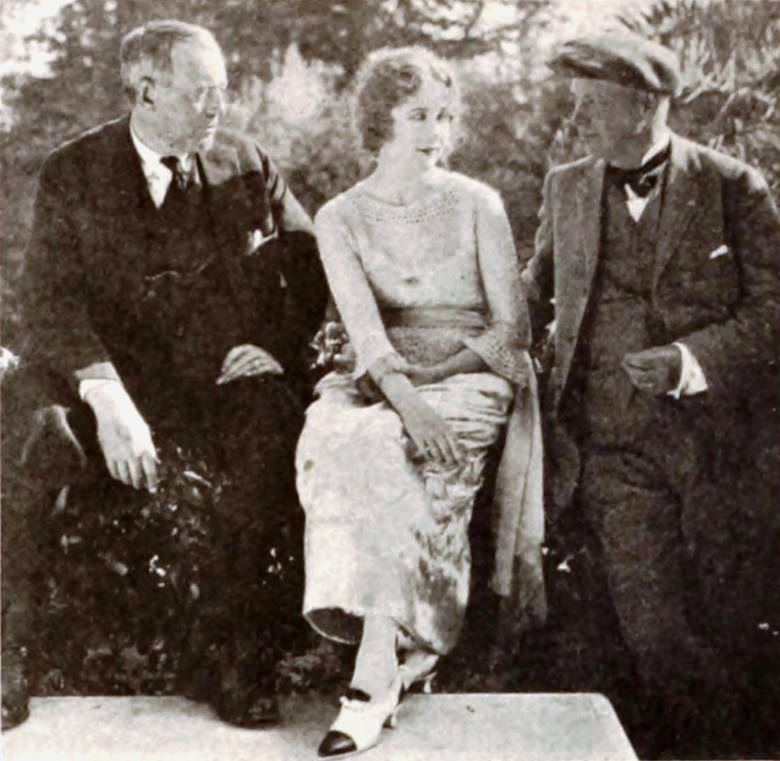
Ingraham and actress Mildred Harris meeting with the vice president of the Rock Island Railroad A. F. Gartz to obtain permission to use his estate as background in their film Old Dad (1920)

=== Actor ===
- The Chef's Revenge (1915)
- Intolerance (1916)
- The Intrusion of Isabel (1919)
- A Front Page Story (1922)
- Scaramouche (1923)
- The Chorus Lady (1924)
- So Long Letty (1929)
- Montana Moon (1930)
- The Naughty Flirt (1931)
- The Lady Who Dared (1931)
- The Widow in Scarlet (1932)
- Get That Girl (1932)
- The Crusader (1932)
- Revenge at Monte Carlo (1933)
- The Gold Ghost (1934)
- Peck's Bad Boy (1934, uncredited)
- Between Men (1935)
- Trail of Terror (1935)
- The Ghost Rider (1935)
- Frontier Justice (1935)
- Timber War (1935)
- Gun Smoke (1936)
- Hearts in Bondage (1936)
- Everyman's Law (1936)
- The Border Patrolman (1936)
- Three Legionnaires (1937)
- The Gambling Terror (1937)
- Riders of the Dawn (1937)
- The Feud Maker (1938)
- Gun Packer (1938)
- Reformatory (1938)
- The Marshal of Mesa City (1939)
- 20 Mule Team (1940)
- Enemy Agent (1940)
- Souls in Pawn (1940)
- Colorado (1940)
- Thundering Hoofs (1942)
- Strictly in the Groove (1942)
- First Comes Courage (1943)
- The Merry Monahans (1944)
- West of the Rio Grande (1944)

=== Director ===
- The Missing Links (1916)
- Hoodoo Ann (1916)
- Stranded (1916)
- American Aristocracy (1916)
- Casey at the Bat (1916)
- The Children Pay (1916)
- Nina, the Flower Girl (1917)
- An Old-Fashioned Young Man (1917)
- Charity Castle (1917)
- Her Country's Call (1917)
- Peggy Leads the Way (1917)
- The Eyes of Julia Deep (1918)
- Rosemary Climbs the Heights (1918)
- Wives and Other Wives (1918)
- The Amazing Impostor (1919)
- The Intrusion of Isabel (1919)
- The House of Intrigue (1919)
- What's Your Husband Doing? (1920)
- Mary's Ankle (1920)
- Let's Be Fashionable (1920)
- The Jailbird (1920)
- Twin Beds (1920)
- Old Dad (1920)
- My Lady Friends (1921)
- Marry the Poor Girl (1921)
- The Girl in the Taxi (1921)
- Lavender and Old Lace (1921)
- Keeping Up with Lizzie (1921)
- At the Sign of the Jack O'Lantern (1922)
- The Danger Point (1922)
- The Veiled Woman (1922)
- Second Hand Rose (1922)
- Going Up (1923)
- The Beauty Prize (1924)
- The Lightning Rider (1924)
- No More Women (1924)
- Soft Shoes (1925)
- Midnight Molly (1925)
- Oh, What a Night! (1926)
- Hearts and Fists (1926)
- The Nutcracker (1926)
- Don Mike (1927)
- Silver Comes Through (1927)
- Jesse James (1927)
- Arizona Nights (1927)
- The Pioneer Scout (1928)
- The Sunset Legion (1928)
- Kit Carson (1928)
- Take the Heir (1930)
- Northern Frontier (1935)
