= The Bandit's Baby =

1925 film

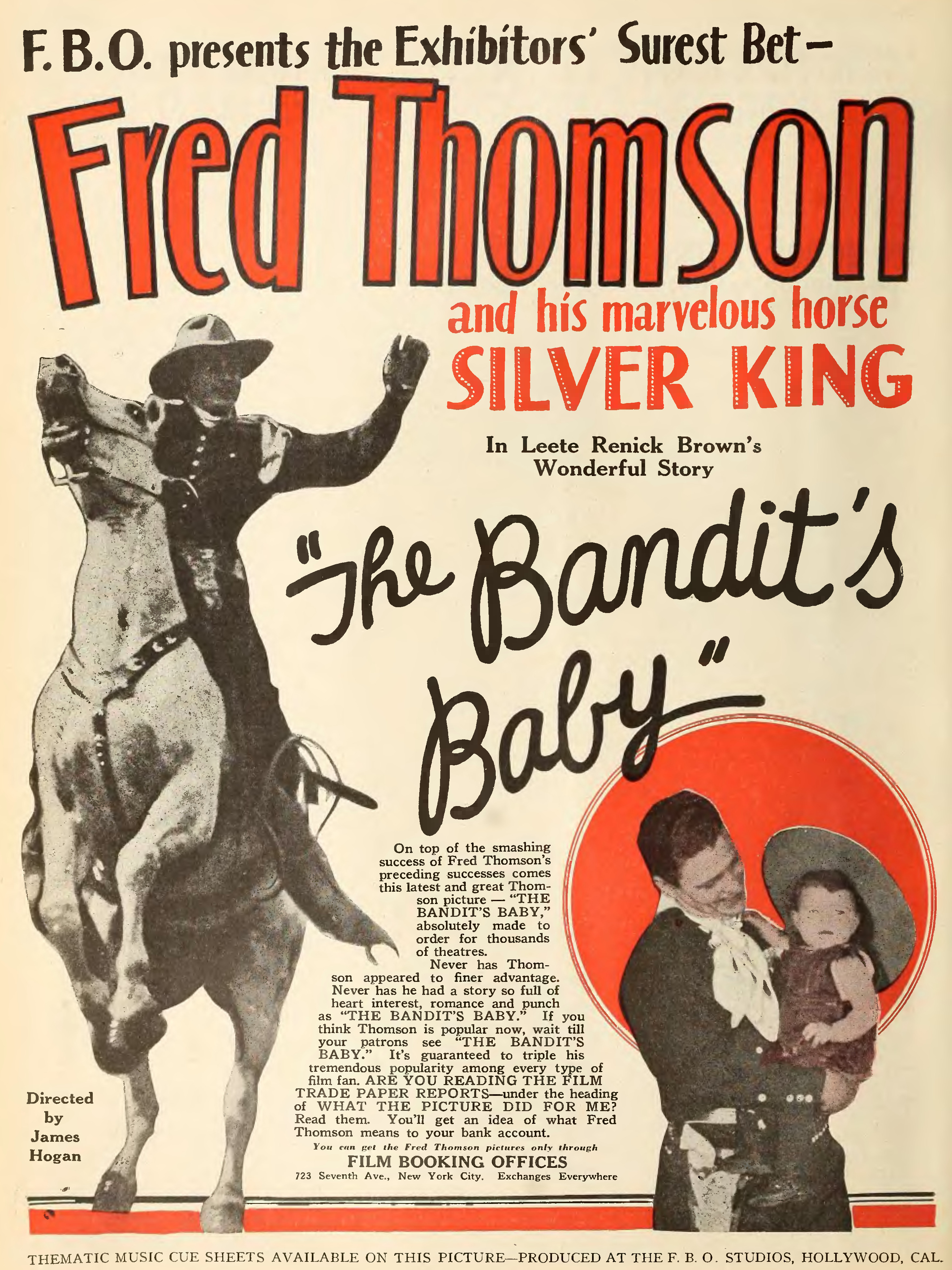
- Advertisement
- Directed by: James P. Hogan
- Written by: Marion Jackson
- Story by: Leete Renick Brown
- Starring: Fred Thomson; Helen Foster
- Cinematography: Ross Fisher
- Production company: Robertson-Cole Pictures Corporation
- Distributed by: Film Booking Offices of America
- Release date: May 17, 1925
- Running time: 50 minutes
- Country: United States
- Language: Silent (English intertitles)

The Bandit's Baby is a 1925 American silent Western film directed by James P. Hogan and starring Fred Thomson and Helen Foster.

== Plot ==
As described in a film magazine review, forced to hide in the hills with his horse Silver when he was unjustly accused of murder, Tom Bailey consents to return to ride in a rodeo when he is granted amnesty for one day. He also acts as a judge at a baby show and picks for first prize the baby brother of Esther Lacy, whose drunken stepfather, Matt Hartigan, is the real murderer. Tom wins the race and foils the sheriff's plan to arrest him by riding away. Esther goes to her brother in Carson City, while Tom keeps custody of the baby. Later Tom saves Esther and the baby, the latter by beating a train headed to an unused spur.

== Cast ==
- Fred Thomson as Tom Bailey
- Helen Foster as Esther Lacy
- Harry Woods as Matt Hartigan
- Mary Louise Miller as Baby
- Clarence Geldart as Sheriff
- Charles W. Mack as Doctor
- David Kirby as Bill Henry
- Derry Dee as Sheriff's Son

== Bibliography ==
- Langman, Larry. A Guide to Silent Westerns. Greenwood Publishing Group, 1992.
