= Del Andrews =

American screenwriter and film director

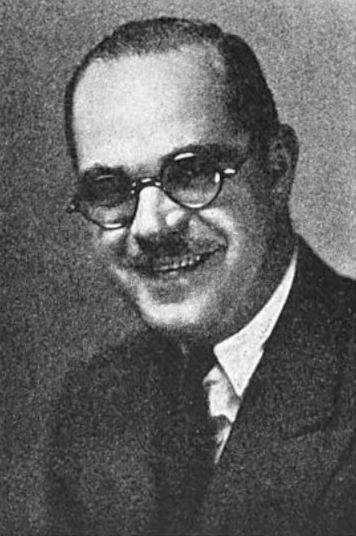
- Born: Udell Endrows; October 5, 1894; St. Louis, Missouri, U.S.
- Died: October 27, 1942 (aged 48); Tonopah, Nevada, U.S.
- Occupation(s): Film director, screenwriter

Del Andrews (October 5, 1894 – October 27, 1942), born Udell Endrows, was an American film director and screenwriter in the 1920s. He primarily worked on low budget westerns, writing and directing films starring Hoot Gibson, Fred Thomson, and Bob Custer.

He shared an Academy Award nomination with Maxwell Anderson for the script to Universal's 1930 film All Quiet on the Western Front.

== Selected filmography ==
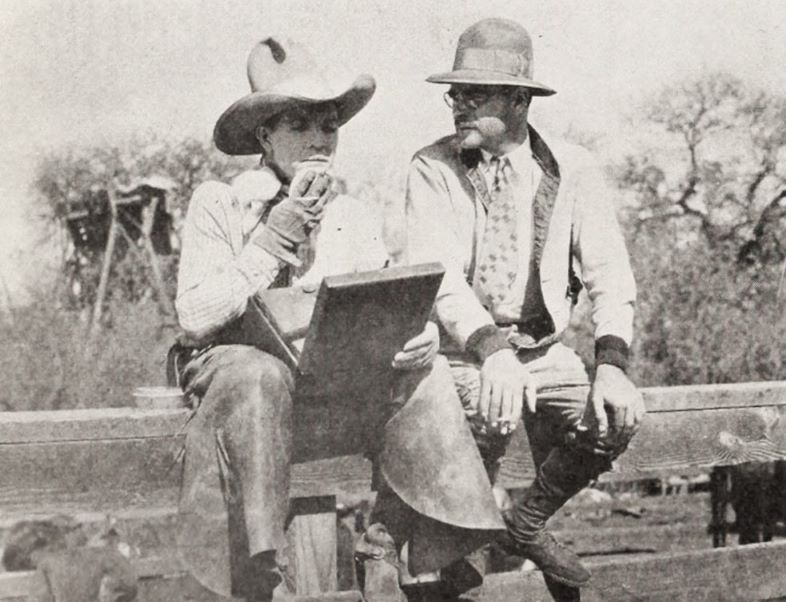
Fred Humes and Del Andrews on the set of The Yellow Back (1926)

- Judgment of the Storm (1924)
- His Forgotten Wife (1924)
- The Wild Bull's Lair (1925)
- Ridin' the Wind (1925)
- The Ridin' Streak (1925)
- Collegiate (1926)
- Lone Hand Saunders (1926)
- The Yellow Back (1926) - as director
- The Hero on Horseback (1927)
- The Racket (1928)
- The Rawhide Kid (1928)
- Betrayal (1929)
- All Quiet on the Western Front (1930)
