= The Tough Guy (1926 film) =

1926 film

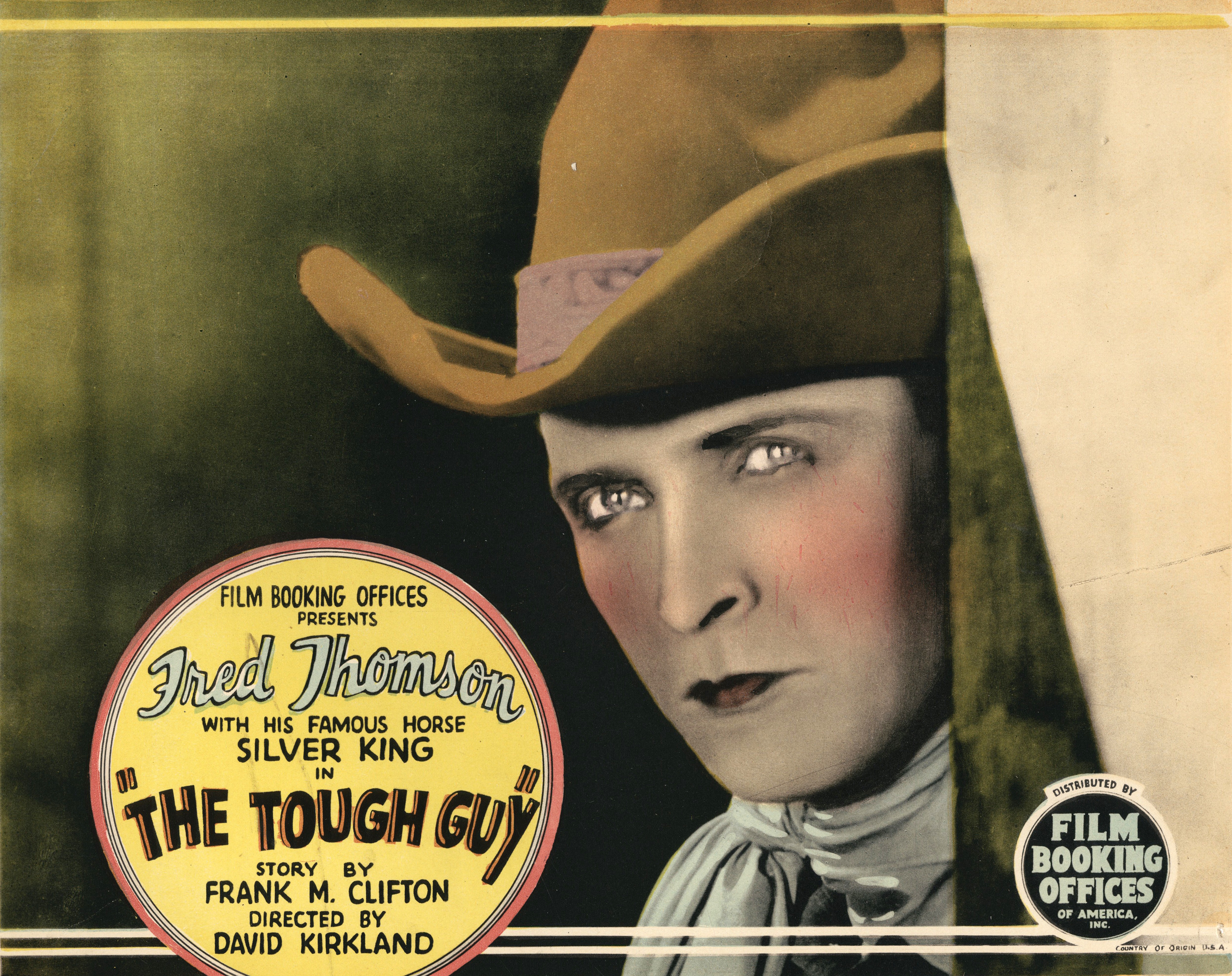
- Lobby card
- Directed by: David Kirkland
- Written by: Frances Marion; Buckleigh Fritz Oxford
- Starring: Fred Thomson; Lola Todd; Robert McKim
- Cinematography: Ross Fisher
- Production company: Film Booking Offices of America
- Distributed by: Film Booking Offices of America
- Release date: February 1, 1926
- Running time: 6 reels
- Country: United States
- Language: Silent (English intertitles)

The Tough Guy is a 1926 American silent Western film directed by David Kirkland and starring Fred Thomson, Lola Todd, and Robert McKim.

== Plot ==
As described in a film magazine review, Fred Saunders is a young ranch foreman who is in love with June Hardy, a school teacher. She is also courted by ranch owner Con Carney. The school teacher is in search of her lost brother Buddy who, unknown to her, is in an orphanage. Both men determine to recover her brother and thereby win her favor. One resorts to unscrupulous methods to gain his end and is defeated by the other, who wins the affections of the young woman.

== Cast ==
- Fred Thomson as Fred Saunders
- Lola Todd as June Hardy
- Robert McKim as Con Carney
- William Courtright as Minister
- Billy Butts as Buddy Hardy
- Leo Willis as Sam Jacks

== Bibliography ==
- Donald W. McCaffrey and Christopher P. Jacobs. Guide to the Silent Years of American Cinema. Greenwood Publishing, 1999. ISBN 0-313-30345-2
