= William Courtright =

American actor

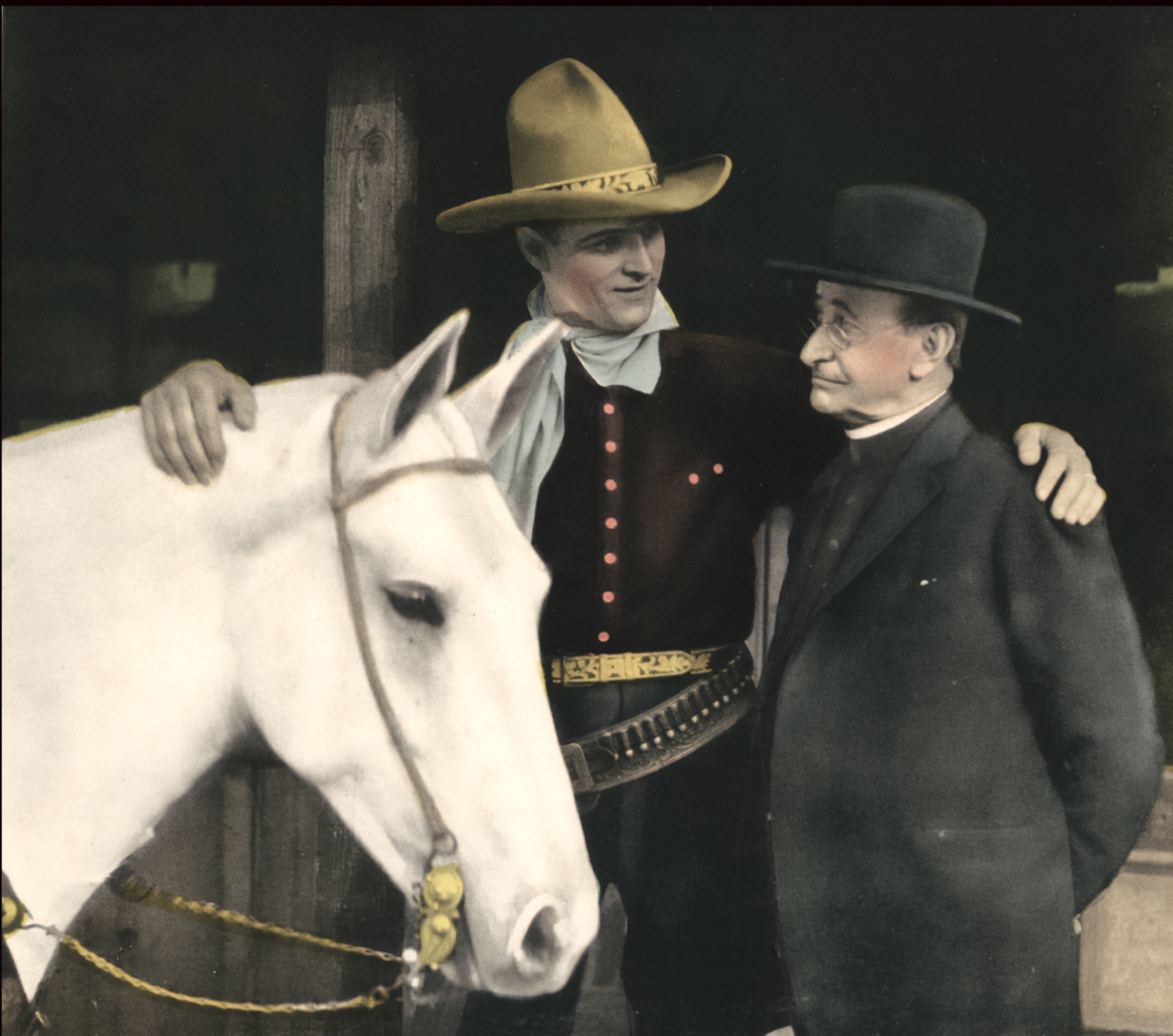
- Courtright (right) in still from The Tough Guy (1926)
- Born: Theodore Courtright; March 10, 1848; New Milford, Illinois, US
- Died: March 6, 1933 (aged 84); Ione, California, US
- Occupation: Actor
- Years active: 1867–1930

William Courtright (February 10, 1848 – March 6, 1933) was an American film actor.

== Early years ==
He was born Albert Theodore Courtright in New Milford, Illinois, and was educated in the public schools of Ione, California. When he was 16, he ran away from home to join a stock theater company.

== Career ==
As Billy Courtright, the actor performed in minstrelsy in San Francisco as early as 1867. He appeared in Virginia City, Nevada's Alhambra theater in 1870. His gimmick, called the flewy-flewy, was to walk on-stage with a suitcase and then put his foot through it. He then paraded around on-stage oblivious to the problem. Courtright's legitimate acting career included Shakespearean plays, as he worked with Lawrence Barrett. Before entering the film industry, he appeared in minstrel shows. He made a world tour as a minstrel, with the tour's activities including performing before King Edward VII.

Sometimes billed as Billy Courtright, he appeared in 68 films between 1912 and 1930. He worked with D. W. Griffith and in his later career at the Hal Roach Studios, where he appeared in several early Laurel and Hardy comedies.

Courtright was still acting at age 80. An item in the October 28, 1928, edition of The Cincinnati Enquirer described him as "the oldest living motion-picture actor on the screen ..."

His best-known role was Oliver Hardy's wealthy Uncle Bernal in That's My Wife (1929). His last film, the Our Gang comedy Teacher's Pet, was also his first sound film. This probably makes him one of the earliest born actors to appear in a sound film.

== Personal life ==
In 1873, Courtright married actress Jennie Lee, and they worked together in vaudeville for 12 years as Courtright and Lee. They also appeared together in Intolerance. Courtright died in Ione, California.

== Partial filmography ==
- If We Only Knew (1913)
- The Ranchero's Revenge (1913)
- In Diplomatic Circles (1913)
- The Sorrowful Shore (1913)
- The Enemy's Baby (1913)
- Intolerance (1916)
- The Deciding Kiss (1918)
- Hitting the High Spots (1918)
- Hard Boiled (1919)
- Ace of the Saddle (1919)
- The Jailbird (1920)
- The Blooming Angel (1920)
- 45 Minutes from Broadway (1920)
- The Speed Girl (1921)
- The Millionaire (1921)
- Man Under Cover (1922)
- At the Sign of the Jack O'Lantern (1922)
- Bell Boy 13 (1923)
- The Girl I Loved (1923)
- A Man of Action (1923)
- The Heart Buster (1924)
- Are Parents People? (1925)
- The Trouble with Wives (1925)
- Some Pun'kins (1925)
- Thank You (1925)
- All Around Frying Pan (1925)
- The Nickel-Hopper (1926)
- The Tough Guy (1926)
- A Regular Scout (1926)
- The Two-Gun Man (1926)
- Lone Hand Saunders (1926)
- For Wives Only (1926)
- Hands Across the Border (1926)
- On the Front Page (1926)
- Don Mike (1927)
- Duck Soup (1927)
- Arizona Nights (1927)
- Silver Comes Through (1927)
- The Glorious Fourth (1927)
- Jesse James (1927)
- The Pioneer Scout (1928)
- The Sunset Legion (1928)
- That's My Wife (1929)
- Teacher's Pet (1930)
