= Lone Hand Saunders =

1926 film directed by B. Reeves Eason

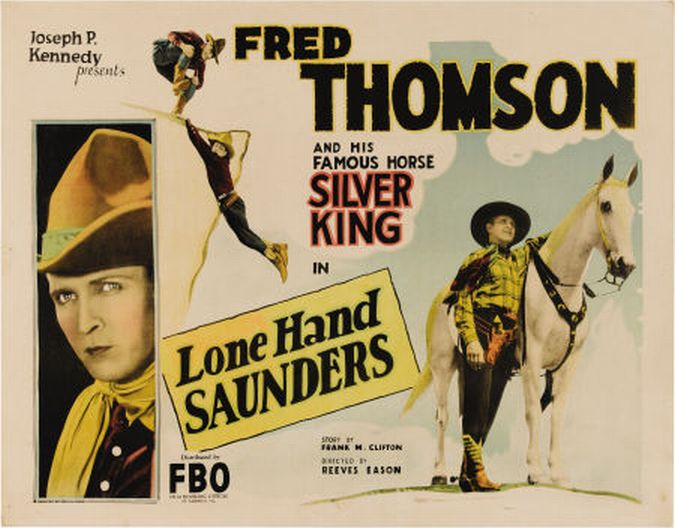
- Lobby card
- Directed by: B. Reeves Eason
- Written by: Del Andrews; Frances Marion
- Starring: Fred Thomson; Bess Flowers; Frank Hagney
- Cinematography: Ross Fisher
- Production company: Film Booking Offices of America
- Distributed by: Film Booking Offices of America
- Release date: September 1926
- Running time: 6 reels
- Country: United States
- Language: Silent (English intertitles)

Lone Hand Saunders is a 1926 American silent Western film directed by B. Reeves Eason and starring Fred Thomson, Bess Flowers, and Frank Hagney.

== Cast ==
- Fred Thomson as Fred Saunders
- Bess Flowers as Alice Mills
- Billy Butts as Buddy
- Frank Hagney as Buck
- Albert Prisco as Charlie
- William Dyer as Sheriff
- William Courtright as Dr. Bandy

== Bibliography ==
- Donald W. McCaffrey & Christopher P. Jacobs. Guide to the Silent Years of American Cinema. Greenwood Publishing, 1999. ISBN 0-313-30345-2
