= Fred Thomson =

American actor

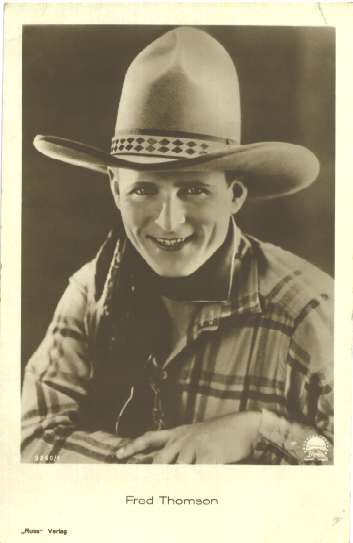
- Thomson, c. 1927
- Born: Frederick Clifton Thomson; February 26, 1890; Pasadena, California, U.S.
- Died: December 25, 1928 (aged 38); Los Angeles, California, U.S.
- Spouses: Gail Dubois Jepson (m. 1913–1916) Frances Marion (m. 1919)
- Children: 2

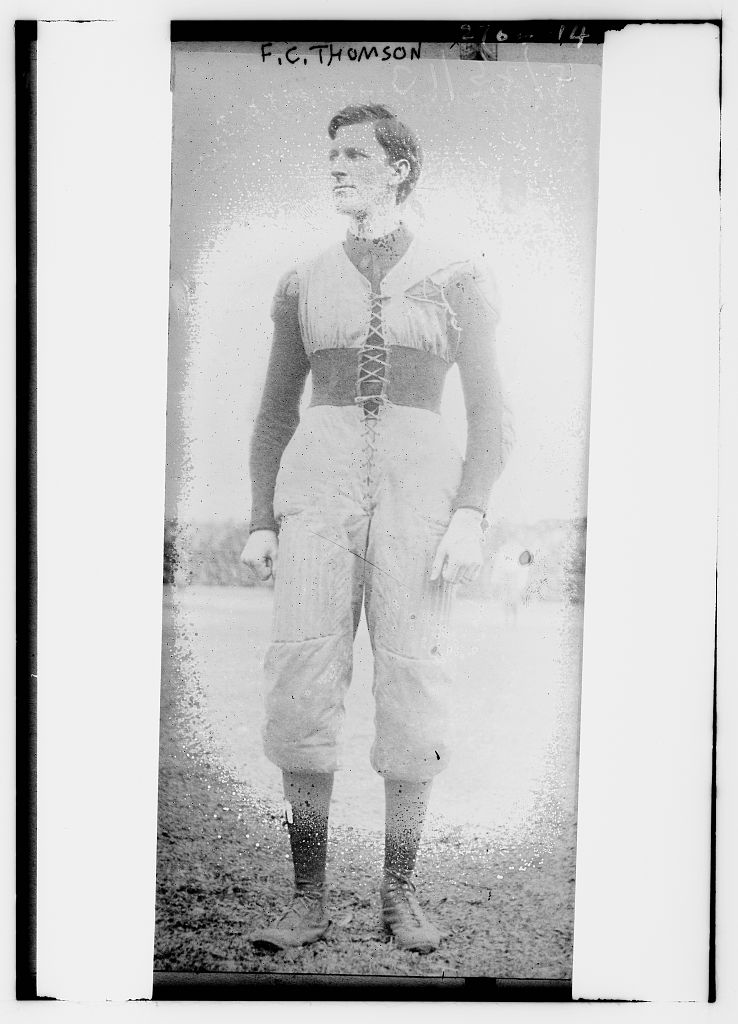
Fred C. Thomson in 1913 (George Grantham Bain Collection at the Library of Congress)

Fred and Silver King in Silver Comes Through (1927)

Frederick Clifton Thomson (February 26, 1890 – December 25, 1928) was an American silent film cowboy who rivaled Tom Mix in popularity before dying at age 38 of tetanus.

== Birth and athletic achievement ==
Born in Pasadena, California to Clara and Williell Thomson, he was the third of four sons. His father was a Presbyterian minister. His brother Samuel Harrison Thomson also attended Princeton University and won the all-round athlete of America title for 1919.

He attended the Princeton Theological Seminary from 1910–13 and he won the All-Around Champion title given out by the Amateur Athletic Union in 1910, 1911, and 1913.

He married his college sweetheart, Gail Jepson and was ordained by the Presbytery of Los Angeles in September 1913. Three years later, Gail Jepson died of tuberculosis.

During World War I, Thomson served in the 143rd Field Artillery Regiment, known informally at the time as the Mary Pickford Regiment. Thomson joined the 143rd in Arcadia, California as a U. S. Army chaplain. While playing football, he broke his leg. Movie star Mary Pickford visited the patients in the hospital ward with her friend, screenwriter Frances Marion. Thomson and Marion agreed to marry after the war was over. The 143rd were sent to France in August 1918, but did not see any action before the armistice on November 11, 1918.

== Movie career ==
Thomson and Marion were married on November 2, 1919, at the Memorial Baptist Church in New York City, with Pickford as maid of honor.

Initially interested in directing, he ended up acting in one of Frances' films Just Around the Corner (1921). The movie was a success. Next, he had a co-starring role in another Pickford movie, The Love Light (1921), which was also directed and written by Frances. In 1923, Thomson starred in his own action serial for Universal, The Eagle's Talons, in which he performed his own stunts.

Signed by Joseph P. Kennedy's studio Film Booking Offices of America, he made his debut for FBO in 1924's The Mask of Lopez. Thomson became a superstar at FBO: He was the No. 2 box office star for 1926 and 1927. His April 1925 contract paid him $10,000 a week (equivalent to approximately $183,586 in 2025 dollars) and also gave Thomson his own independent production unit at the studio.

In 1927, Kennedy—sensing that Thomson had reached the peak of his popularity and seeing a financial opportunity for FBO—arranged a four-picture deal with Paramount Pictures, one of the major Hollywood studios. The deal essentially ceded Thomson to the rival studio. For guaranteeing $75,000 in financing, Thomson would star in Paramount productions. In return, Paramount would return the $75,000 in financing plus an additional $100,000 and pay Thomson $15,000 a week, wiping Thomson's salary off of FBO's books.

Paramount's exhibition circuit was more prestigious than FBO's, and its theaters, many located in larger cities, charged a premium for a ticket. In addition, Paramount boosted the price of a Thomson picture to cover the backend deal with FBO and Thomson's hefty salary. The new production arrangement meant that Thomson fans in rural theaters that were the core of FBO's audience often had to wait months for a chance to see a new Thomson picture, if it was even released to backwater theaters, or were forced to go to a larger city where the movie was playing on the Paramount circuit. Some critics found that a Thomson Western, which essentially were "B-pictures", were not suited for the high-end, more expensive theaters they were being shown in. As a result, the Thomson-Paramount Westerns proved not to be as profitable.

== Death ==
In early December 1928, Thomson stepped on a nail while working in his stables. Contracting tetanus, which his doctors initially misdiagnosed, he died in Los Angeles on Christmas Day 1928. He was survived by his widow, screenwriter Frances Marion, and their children Richard Thomson (adopted) and Frederick C. Thomson.

Thomson was interred in Forest Lawn Memorial Park in Glendale, California (Whispering Pines, L-163 section). Pallbearers at his funeral included Harold Lloyd, Charles Farrell, Douglas Fairbanks, and George W. Hill. Honorary pallbearers included Buster Keaton and movie mogul Joseph M. Schenck.

== Silver King ==
Silver King was a Palomino horse seventeen hands high. Al Rogell, who directed Thomson's first seven Western films, told about Silver King: "He did all of the work...everything in the early pictures—the mouth work, the jumps, the chases, the falls, quick stops—and could untie knots, lift bars, etc. He could wink one eye, nod his head yes or no, push a person with his head. Thomson trained him to do certain things and expected him to perform them."

After Thomson's death, Silver King appeared in a series of three-reel Westerns from Imperial Studios, starring Wally Wales.

== Surviving film legacy ==
Thomson never appeared in a sound film lost or otherwise. He made a total of 30 films between 1921 and 1928. But complete prints of only 8 survive. Another 3 survive are partially lost which means 19 are completely lost. The films that survive in full are Just Around the Corner (1921), survives in the collection of the Library of Congress; The Love Light (1921), starring Mary Pickford, has been released on VHS and DVD; A Chapter in Her Life (1923), The Dangerous Coward (1924), Thundering Hoofs (1924) has been released on VHS, A Regular Scout (1926), and Kit Carson (1928). The films that are partially lost are Galloping Gallagher (1924), Lone Hand Saunders (1926), The Two-Gun Man (1926), and Silver Comes Through (1927).

In Thundering Hoofs, Thomson performs a dangerous jump from a moving stagecoach to one of the horses pulling the coach. He fell and suffered a compound fracture of his right thigh. Yakima Canutt completed the stunt. Production of the movie was delayed for weeks while Thomson recovered from his injury.

== Filmography ==
- Just Around the Corner (1921) directed by Frances Marion
- The Love Light (1921)
- Penrod (1922)
- Oath-Bound (1922)
- The Eagle's Talons (1923)
- A Chapter in Her Life (1923)
- The Mask of Lopez (1924)
- North of Nevada (1924)
- Galloping Gallagher (1924)
- The Silent Stranger (1924)
- The Dangerous Coward (1924)
- The Fighting Sap (1924)
- Thundering Hoofs (1924)
- That Devil Quemado (1925)
- The Bandit's Baby (1925)
- The Wild Bull's Lair (1925)
- Ridin' the Wind (1925)
- All Around Frying Pan (1925)
- The Tough Guy (1926)
- Hands Across the Border (1926)
- The Two-Gun Man (1926)
- Lone Hand Saunders (1926)
- A Regular Scout (1926)
- Don Mike (1927)
- Silver Comes Through (1927)
- Arizona Nights (1927)
- Jesse James (1927)
- The Pioneer Scout (1928)
- The Sunset Legion (1928)
- Kit Carson (1928)

== See also ==
- Fred C. Thomson Building

== Notes ==
=== References ===
- Beauchamp, Cari (1998). Without Lying Down: Frances Marion and the Powerful Women of Early Hollywood. Berkeley, Los Angeles, and London: University of California Press. ISBN 0-520-21492-7.
- Beauchamp, Cari (2010). Joseph P. Kennedy Presents: His Hollywood Years. New York: Knopf. ISBN 978-1400040001.
- Wyatt, Edgar M. (1988). More Than a Cowboy: the Life and Times of Fred Thomson and Silver King. Wyatt Classics.
- Zarnowski, Frank (2005). All-Around Men. Scarecrow Press. ISBN 0-8108-5423-6.
