= August 1911 =

Month of 1911

<<	August 1911					>>
Su	Mo	Tu	We	Th	Fr	Sa
		1	2	3	4	5
6	7	8	9	10	11	12
13	14	15	16	17	18	19
20	21	22	23	24	25	26
27	28	29	30	31

August 21, 1911: The Mona Lisa...

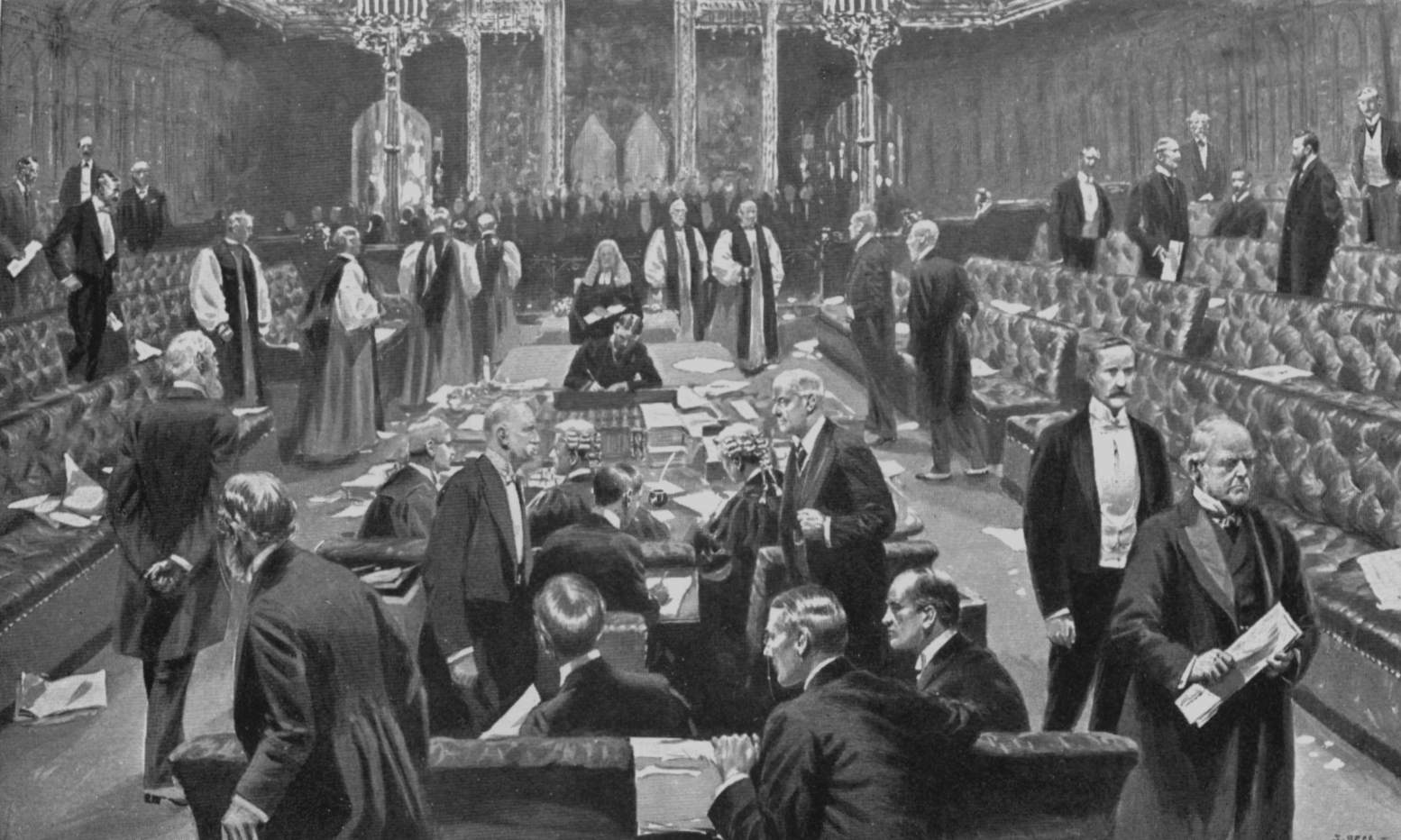
August 11, 1911: Britain's House of Lords approves limits on its power with the Parliament Act

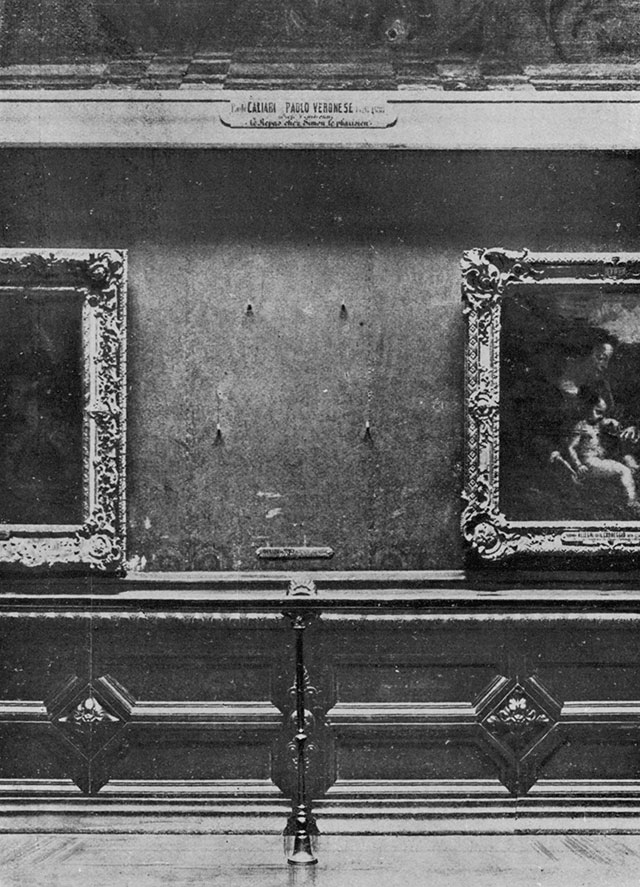
...stolen from the Louvre

The following events occurred in August 1911:

== August 1, 1911 (Tuesday) ==
- Harriet Quimby became the first American woman to receive an airplane pilot's license, and only the second in the world (after Raymonde de Laroche). She was one of only 37 certified pilots in the world at that time.

== August 2, 1911 (Wednesday) ==
- President François C. Antoine Simon of Haiti fled from his palace at Port-au-Prince as rebels approached, and took refuge on the Haitian cruiser 17 Decembre. The next day, he and 43 relatives and associates departed on the Dutch steamer Prinz Nederlanden bound for Jamaica.
- Born:
  - Ann Dvorak, American stage and film actress; as Annabelle McKim in New York City (d. 1979).
  - Rusty Wescoatt, American character actor; on the island of Maui, in Hawaii Territory (d. 1987)
- Died:
  - Arabella Mansfield, 65, the first female lawyer in the United States.
  - Bob Cole, 43, African-American composer and comedian, by suicide.
  - Ioryi Mucitano, 29, Aromanian revolutionary within the Internal Macedonian Revolutionary Organization (IMRO) in the Ottoman Empire and Apostol Petkov, 42, Bulgarian Macedonian revolutionary within IMRO. Both Mucitano and Petkov were poisoned along with Vasa Pufkata.

== August 3, 1911 (Thursday) ==
- The United States signed arbitration treaties with both the United Kingdom and France in separate ceremonies at the White House office of U.S. President William Taft. At 3:10 pm, British Ambassador James Bryce and U.S. Secretary of State Philander Knox signed the first pact. French Ambassador Jean Jules Jusserand and Knox signed the second treaty. Based on the concept of "unlimited arbitration" of disputes between these three great powers, the "Taft-Knox Treaties" were favored by the American public, but the U.S. Senate amended both agreements beyond recognition. Taft refused to renegotiate the terms with the other nations.
- Allvar Gullstrand first demonstrated the slit lamp. His invention's introduction has been described as "an occasion of tremendous significance to ophthalmology."
- Born: Manuel Esperon, Mexican composer and songwriter, in Mexico City (d. 2011).
- Died:
  - Edward Murphy Jr., former U.S. Senator from New York."Edward Murphy, Jr. Buried". The Sun. New York, NY. August 6, 1911 – via Newspapers.com.

== August 4, 1911 (Friday) ==
- Japan's Admiral Count Tōgō Heihachirō, commander of the Japanese fleet during the Russo-Japanese War, was welcomed to New York City as a guest of the United States. After arriving the night before on the Lusitania at 11:40 pm, he transferred to two smaller boats and stayed at the Hotel Knickerbocker. Meeting Mayor William J. Gaynor later in the day, he departed on a train for Washington, D.C. that afternoon, where he was hosted at a state dinner by President Taft.

== August 5, 1911 (Saturday) ==
- Colombian and Peruvian troops fought a battle in Caquetá Department, with the Colombian forces being defeated and reportedly sustaining large losses.
- The sinking of an overcrowded passenger boat on the Nile River killed 100 people. Most of the victims were on their way to a festival in Desouk.
- Born: Robert Taylor (stage name for Spangler Brugh), American film and TV actor known for the title role of the 1952 film Ivanhoe and as the star of The Detectives and as the second host of Death Valley Days; in Filley, Nebraska (d. 1969).

== August 6, 1911 (Sunday) ==
- General Cincinnatus Leconte was proclaimed as President of Haiti, rather than General Anténor Firmin, who had also led an attack on the capital, replacing President Simon. Leconte was formally elected on August 14.
- Born:
  - Lucille Ball, American comedian and television executive (I Love Lucy); in Celoron, New York (a suburb of Jamestown) (d. 1989).

== August 7, 1911 (Monday) ==
- Leader of the Opposition Arthur Balfour's vote of censure on the government of Prime Minister H. H. Asquith failed to pass in the House of Commons, by a margin of 246 to 365. A similar measure in the House of Lords had passed 282-68.
- Born: Nicholas Ray (stage name for Raymond Nicholas Kienzle), American film director known for Rebel Without a Cause); in Galesville, Wisconsin (d. 1979).
- Died: Elizabeth Akers Allen, 78, American poet.

== August 8, 1911 (Tuesday) ==
- Pope Pius X lowered the age for First Communion in the Roman Catholic Church to seven years old, with the papal decree quam singulari.
- The first American newsreel, Pathé's Weekly, was shown in North American cinemas. Promotional material described it as "issued every Tuesday, made up of short scenes of great international events of universal interest from all over the world."
- The United States Senate approved statehood for Arizona and New Mexico, 53 to 18. Earlier a proposed amendment by Senator Nelson of Minnesota, proposing to condition Arizona statehood on removing judicial recall from its constitution, failed 26 to 43.
- Died: William P. Frye, 79, President pro tempore of the U.S. Senate since 1896; U.S. Representative from Maine 1871 to 1881) and U.S. Senator for Maine since 1911.

== August 9, 1911 (Wednesday) ==
- The sinking of the French ship Emir killed 86 people. The Emir collided with the British ship Silverton while passing through the Strait of Gibraltar, five miles east of Tarifa, after sailing from Gibraltar to Tangier. Only 15 people survived from the Emir. The Silverton had been on its way from Newport to Taranto.
- The Australian ship Fifeshire wrecked at Cape Guardafui in the Gulf of Aden, killing 24 of the 99 people on board.
- A record for the hottest day in the history of the United Kingdom was set when a temperature of 36.7 °C (98.1 °F) was measured at Raunds, Northamptonshire, England. The record was broken on August 3, 1990 (37.1 °C) and again on August 10, 2003 (38.1 °C).
- Born: William Alfred Fowler, American astrophysicist, who shared the Nobel Prize in Physics, 1983, for his work on stellar nucleosynthesis; in Pittsburgh (d. 1995).
- Died:
  - John Warne Gates, 56, American financier who went from a salesman of barbed wire to a multimillionaire.
  - George W. Gordon, 75, Commander of the United Confederate Veterans, and, as U.S. Representative from Tennessee, the last Confederate general to serve in Congress.

== August 10, 1911 (Thursday) ==
- By a margin of 131-114, the House of Lords passed the Parliament Act 1911, also called the "Veto Bill" because it allowed the United Kingdom House of Commons to put limits on the Lords' power. More than 300 eligible peers declined to participate. However, the 88 Liberal peers were joined in voting in favor by 29 Tories and 13 of the 15 Anglican archbishops and bishops who cast votes. Conservative MP George Wyndham would later remark, "We were beaten by the bishops and the rats."
- Born: A.N. Sherwin-White, British historian; in Fifield, Oxfordshire (d. 1993).

== August 11, 1911 (Friday) ==
- U.S. President William H. Taft began a three-month-long stay away from Washington, D.C., starting with a monthlong vacation in Beverly, Massachusetts, where the Taft family rented Paramatta from Mrs. Lucy Peabody for use as his "Summer White House". On September 15, he began a 15,000 mile tour of 30 of the 46 states, and did not return to the White House until November 12.
- Born: Field Marshal Thanom Kittikachorn, Prime Minister of Thailand in 1958, and as a military dictator from 1963 to 1973; in Mueang Tak district, Tak province (d. 2004).

== August 12, 1911 (Saturday) ==
- "For a period of one year from and after the date hereof, the landing in Canada shall be, and the same is prohibited, of any immigrants belonging to the Negro race", declared an Order in Council approved by the Cabinet of Prime Minister Wilfrid Laurier on this date, "which race is deemed unsuitable to the climate and requirements of Canada." The racist order, made in response to hundreds of African-Americans moving to the Canadian prairies from Oklahoma, was never enforced, and repealed on October 5.
- Duke Kahanamoku broke three world swimming records in his very first meet, in Honolulu. Besides taking 1.6 seconds off of the 50 yard freestyle (to 24.2), he became the first person to swim 100 yards in under a minute, swimming in 55.4 seconds, 4.6 less than the AAU record.
- Henry Percival James, British Assistant Commissioner of Nigeria, was shot and killed along with five other people while traveling along the Forcados River on government business.
- John Muir set off from Brooklyn to begin a voyage of exploration of the Amazon River.
- Born: Cantinflas (stage name for Fortino Mario Alfonso Moreno Reyes), Mexican film comedian; in Mexico City (d. 1993).
- Died:
  - General Jules Brunet, 73, French Army officer."M. le général Brunet". Bulletin de la Société franco-japonaise de Paris: 220. 1911.
  - Jozef Israëls, 87, Dutch painter.
  - Henry C. Loudenslager, 59, U.S. Congressman for New Jersey since 1893, died from typhoid.

== August 13, 1911 (Sunday) ==
- A lynch mob in Coatesville, Pennsylvania, burned an African-American to death after he was accused of murder. Three men were arrested on August 16. The night before, Zachariah Walker had shot and killed Edgar Rice, a private policeman, then injured himself in a suicide attempt while fleeing. While recovering in custody at the local hospital and restrained to a cot, Rice was seized by an angry mob. A fire was set and Walker, still chained to his hospital bed, was tossed into the flames. Pennsylvania Governor John K. Tener would later say that the charter of Coatesville should be revoked, declaring "Had her officers or her citizens done their duty, the Commonwealth would not have been disgraced and her fair name dishonored.
- Matilde E. Moisant became the 3rd woman licensed airplane pilot in history. Unlike the first two, Raymonde de la Roche and Harriet Quimby, Moisant avoided death in a plane crash, and would live until 1964, to the age of 85.
- Born:
  - William Bernbach, American advertising executive and co-founder of Doyle Dayne Bernbach; in New York City (d. 1982).
  - Bert Combs, reformist Governor of Kentucky from 1959 to 1963, state and federal appellate court judge; in Manchester, Kentucky (drowned in accident, 1991).

== August 14, 1911 (Monday) ==
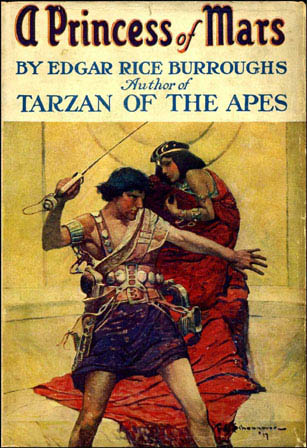
"Dejah Thoris, Martian Princess"

- Edgar Rice Burroughs, a 35-year-old salesman for a manufacturer of pencil sharpeners, submitted a partial manuscript for "Dejah Thoris, Martian Princess" to Argosy magazine. The title would be changed and the story lengthened to six installments in All-Story Magazine with the title Under the Moons of Mars, starting the literary career of Burroughs.
- Harry Atwood took off from St. Louis at 7:05 in the morning local time to begin a 1,265 mile trip to New York City. Making 20 stops, and logging 28½ hours flying time, he reached New York at 2:38 pm on August 25.
- Born: Ethel L. Payne, African-American journalist who earned the nickname "First Lady of the Black Press" for her tough reporting for the Chicago Defender

== August 15, 1911 (Tuesday) ==
- President Taft vetoed the statehood bill for Arizona and New Mexico to the 46-state union. Although the veto was directed at Arizona's judicial recall provision, New Mexico was blocked because the two states had been included in the same legislation.
- Born: Anthony "Fat Tony" Salerno, member of the American Mafia and a leader of the Genovese Family; in East Harlem, New York City (d. 1992).
- Died: Major Henry Reed Rathbone, 74, who was present at the assassination of Abraham Lincoln and had been stabbed by John Wilkes Booth. Rathbone had been imprisoned at the Hildesheim Asylum for the Criminally Insane after murdering his wife while the American Consul at Hanover.

== August 16, 1911 (Wednesday) ==
- The government of France accepted the terms of the Convention of Niamey that delineated the borders between French West Africa and Germany's two west African colonies, Kamerun (now Cameroon) and Togoland (later divided into Togo and eastern Ghana). Prime Minister Joseph Caillaux endorsed the settlement following several years of negotiations. The border agreement effectively determined the current boundaries between Burkina Faso and Ghana and Togo, as well as between Togo and Benin and between Cameroon and Chad.
- Born: E. F. Schumacher, German-born British economist known for his proposals for decentralized and appropriate technologies, author of Small Is Beautiful: A Study of Economics As If People Mattered; in Bonn (d. 1977)
- Died: Patrick Francis Moran, 80, Archbishop of Sydney and he first Roman Catholic Cardinal from Australia.

== August 17, 1911 (Thursday) ==
- U.S. President Taft vetoed the Wool Tariff Reform Bill, an amendment to the Payne–Aldrich Tariff Act that would have cut the duty on imported wool in half, reducing the cost of clothing to American consumers. The legislation had passed earlier in the week, 206-90 in the House, but only 38-28 in the Senate. A historian would later write that, in making the veto, "Taft deliberately, knowingly committed the sole enduring mistake of his presidency."
- In Britain, civil unrest across the industrial regions continued with the first national railway strike, beginning with the Llanelli Railway Riots. Six men died during the protests that aimed to improve workers rights.
- Born:
  - Mikhail Botvinnik, World Chess Champion 1948–1957; 1958–1960 and 1960–1963; in Kuokkala, Russian Empire (d. 1995).
  - Martin Sandberger, German Nazi war criminal who oversaw the mas murder of Jews in German-occupied Latvia and Estonia during World War II, and the arrest and deportation of Jews in Italy; in Charlottenburg, Berlin (d. 2010)
- Died: Myrtle Reed, 36, writer of fiction (including Lavender and Old Lace), and cookbooks, committed suicide.

== August 18, 1911 (Friday) ==
- In Indiana, William Perry Woods incorporated the Royal Order of Lions. This was a forerunner of Lions Clubs International (incorporated 1917), the world's largest service club organization, with 1,350,000 members in 45,000 Lions Club chapters.
- Royal assent was given to the Veto bill.
- The U.S. Senate adopted resolution to admit Arizona and New Mexico; the House passed the bill the next day
- Ten days after the Pathe newsreel debut in the United States, the first Vitagraph newsreel was shown, The Vitagraph Monthly of Current Events.

== August 19, 1911 (Saturday) ==
- The victory of Emilio Estrada over General Flavio Alfaro in elections for President of Ecuador was certified by the Ecuadorian Congress.
- The Constitution of the Republic of Portugal was adopted by the National Assembly at 1:35 am.
- The United States Senate voted 53-8 in favor of an amendment to the statehood bill for Arizona and New Mexico, conditioning Arizona's admission into the union on its revocation of a provision to recall elected judges.
- A mob of 200 men in Wales attacked and looted Jewish-owned shops at Tredegar. On August 21, rioting spread to Ebbw Vale and Rhymney, and by August 22 across the rest of Wales.

== August 20, 1911 (Sunday) ==
- The New York Times sent the first round-the-world cable message, receiving the text back 16 1/2 minutes after it was sent.
- Lincoln Beachey broke the world altitude record, ascending to a height of 11,642 feet, more than 2 miles and more than 3 1/2 km.
- Born: Karl Frenzel, German Nazi war criminal who commanded the Sobibor extermination camp; in Zehdenick (died of natural causes, 1996).

== August 21, 1911 (Monday) ==
- The Mona Lisa was stolen from the Louvre Museum while the museum was closed for cleaning. Witnesses reported that a tall stout individual had been carrying what appeared to be a large panel covered with a horse blanket, then caught the Paris to Bordeaux express at 7:47 am as it was pulling out of the Quai d'Orsay station. Two years later, Vincenzo Peruggia, an Italian patriot who claimed that he stole the painting to return it to the homeland of Leonardo da Vinci, was arrested in Florence and the painting was recovered.
- At 3:08 pm, President Taft signed the joint resolution offering American statehood to Arizona and New Mexico.
- Former U.S. President Theodore Roosevelt announced that he would not consent to use of his name as a possible candidate in 1912.
- Sir James Whitney, the Premier of Ontario, announced that he opposed the reciprocity bill with the United States because he believed that it would lead to annexation.
- Born: Anthony Boucher, mystery and science fiction author, as William Anthony White in Oakland, California (died of lung cancer, 1968).

== August 22, 1911 (Tuesday) ==
- The former Shah of Persia was routed at Savadkuh with the loss of 300 of his men.
- In Britain, the Official Secrets Act 1911 was given royal assent, providing heavy penalties for spying, "wrongful communication of information," "harbouring spies," and "attempts to commit offence or incitement to commit offence."

== August 23, 1911 (Wednesday) ==
- A secret meeting of the Committee of Imperial Defence was convened by Prime Minister Asquith to discuss overall military strategy for war against Germany. Field Marshal Sir Henry Wilson and Admiral Sir Arthur Wilson, the leaders of the British Army and the Royal Navy, respectively, presented their opposing views on how a war in continental Europe should be conducted.
- Born:
  - Betty Robinson, U.S. athlete and winner of first women's 100 meter in the Summer Olympics; gold medalist 1928 and 1936; holder of 100m world record and "fastest woman on Earth," 1928–1932; in Riverdale, Illinois (d. 1999).Elizabeth (Betty) Robinson (Schwartz) at the USATF Hall of Fame (archived)
  - Birger Ruud, Norwegian ski jumper, Olympic gold medalist 1932 and 1936, world champion 1931, 1935 and 1937; in Kongsberg (d. 1998).

== August 24, 1911 (Thursday) ==
- Led by the organization Tung Chi Huei, Chinese citizens living in Chengdu walked off of their jobs in protest over the Imperial Government's agreement with foreign nations to build a railroad through the Sichuan Province, after businesses there had raised $20,000,000 to build it themselves. "Few people in this country realized when the brief telegrams reported the occurrence of a strike," wrote an American author later, "that the beginning of the end of the Manchu Dynasty had arrived." The Xinhai Revolution would begin six weeks later.
- Manuel de Arriaga, Procurator General of Portugal was elected the first President of Portugal, receiving 121 votes from the Constituent Assembly. In second place was Foreign Minister Bernardo Machado, with 86 votes. Arriaga had been a professor at Columbia University and had taught English to the late King Carlos of Portugal.
- The first shipment of coal was made from Harlan County, Kentucky, the beginning of its transformation into a major coal producer. The population rose from 11,000 to 31,500 in ten years because of the influx of miners and their families, and to 75,000 by 1940, before declining to 25,000 by 2024.
- Born: Frederick E. Nolting Jr., U.S. Ambassador to South Vietnam (1961–1963); in Richmond, Virginia (d. 1989).

== August 25, 1911 (Friday) ==
- Andre Jaeger-Schmidt travelled around the world in 40 days, arriving at Cherbourg at 11:15 pm, in Paris, 4 hours and 17 minutes ahead of schedule.
- Harry Atwood completed his flight from St. Louis to New York, covering 1,265 miles in 11 days, setting a new distance record.
- Twenty-eight people were killed and 74 injured in a train wreck at Manchester, New York. Two passenger cars on the Lehigh Valley Train No. 4 fell from the track into a ravine after encountering a section of track weakened by metal fatigue. Many of the dead and injured were veterans of the American Civil War and other members of the Grand Army of the Republic organization, on their way to an encampment in Rochester.
- George Santayana address coined a term in "The Genteel Tradition in American Philosophy" in an address to the Philosophical Union of the University of California at Berkeley
- Count Katsura Tarō resigned as Prime Minister of Japan, along with his entire cabinet.
- Born: Võ Nguyên Giáp, North Vietnamese General who guided the Communist victory in the Vietnam War; in An Xa, Le Thuy district, Quảng Bình Province (d. 2013).
- Died: William S. Hutchings, 80, the "lightning calculator" for P.T. Barnum's circus.

== August 26, 1911 (Saturday) ==
- Twenty-six people were killed at the Morgan Opera House, a movie theatre in Canonsburg, Pennsylvania, after a false alarm of fire. At 8:15 pm, 800 people were watching a film when it flared up and a cry of alarm was made.
- At the Indian Head, Maryland, proving grounds of the U.S. Navy, an anti-aircraft shell was fired to a record high altitude, 18,000 feet.
- The Argentine battleship ARA Rivadavia, largest in the world, was launched at the Fore River Shipyard in Quincy, Massachusetts. Madame Naon, wife of the Argentine Ambassador to the United States, broke the champagne bottle over the bow at 1:58 pm.

== August 27, 1911 (Sunday) ==
- Quoting from astronomer Percival Lowell, The New York Times reported that "vast engineering works" had been "accomplished in an incredibly short time by our planetary neighbors," referring to canals built on the planet Mars by its inhabitants. The Times noted that in two years, straight chasms had been built that were 20 miles wide and 1,000 miles in length.
- The phrase "our place in the sun," describing one's belief in an entitlement, was first used by Germany's Kaiser Wilhelm II in a speech delivered at Hamburg. "No one can dispute with us the place in the sun that is our due," borrowed from Blaise Pascal's Pensees.
- Fifteen people were killed by a hurricane at Charleston, South Carolina.
- Born: Johnny Eck (stage name for John Eckhardt Jr.); American acrobat and sideshow performer who overcame a birth defect of being born without legs by making a performance of walking on his hands; in Baltimore. Robert Ripley, author of the Believe It or Not! newspaper feature called him "The Most Remarkable Man in the World";

== August 28, 1911 (Monday) ==
- The United States acquired the four small Causeway Islands (Flamenco, Culebra, Naos and Perico) at the western end of the Panama Canal. Later named collectively for the causeway that connected them to the mainland, the islands reverted to Panamanian control when the Panama Canal Zone was transferred in 1979.
- Born: Joseph Luns, Foreign Minister of the Netherlands, 1952–1971, Secretary General of NATO, 1971–1984; in Rotterdam (d. 2002).

== August 29, 1911 (Tuesday) ==
- "Ishi", the last surviving member of the Yahi American Indian tribe and last speaker of the Yana language, was discovered hiding in a corral near Oroville, California. Ishi lived the rest of his life as the guest of Professor Alfred Kroeber, curator of the Museum of Anthropology in San Francisco, and died in 1916.
- Died: Mahbub Ali Khan, Asaf Jah VI, 45, richest prince of the Indian Empire. As the Nizam of Hyderabad, he had an income of $10,000,000 a year and ruled over 11 million subjects. He was succeeded by his 25-year-old son, Osman Ali Khan.

== August 30, 1911 (Wednesday) ==
- The Director of the U.S. Census Bureau announced that the center of population in the United States had been calculated incorrectly, at that it was located in the western part of Bloomington, Indiana, eight miles from the originally announced center in Brown County, Indiana.
- The Marquis Saionji Kinmochi became the new prime minister of Japan.
- Francisco I. Madero was formally nominated for President of Mexico as a candidate for the National Progressive Party.
- Sir William Ramsay predicted that Britain's coal supplies would be exhausted by 2086.
- Born:
  - Arsenio Rodríguez, blind Cuban musician who popularized son cubano (d. 1970).
  - Robert Gibney, Bell Labs chemist who helped perfect the transistor; in Wilmington, Delaware (d. 1980).

== August 31, 1911 (Thursday) ==
- Standard Oil Company of New Jersey, at one time the largest corporation in the United States and the largest oil producer and refiner in the world, ceased to exist in accordance with the May 15 antitrust judgment in Standard Oil Co. of New Jersey v. United States. Upon remand from the U.S. Supreme Court ruling, the company had been given until the end of August "to relinquish its control of the subsidiary concerns" and to transfer the remaining capital to the stockholders of the companies created from the breakup.
- The city of San Fernando, California, was incorporated.
- Died: Brigadier General Benjamin Grierson, 85, Union cavalry leader during the American Civil War, and later organizer and commander of the African-American 10th Cavalry Regiment of the United States Army.
