= William Hutchings (disambiguation) =

William Hutchings (1879–1948) was an English amateur cricketer.

William Hutchings may also refer to:

- William S. Hutchings (1832–1911), math prodigy and mental calculator
- William Hutchings (priest) (1835–1912), Anglican priest and author

== See also ==
- William Hutchins (disambiguation)
