= November 1911 =

Month of 1911

<<	November 1911					>>
Su	Mo	Tu	We	Th	Fr	Sa
			1	2	3	4
5	6	7	8	9	10	11
12	13	14	15	16	17	18
19	20	21	22	23	24	25
26	27	28	29	30

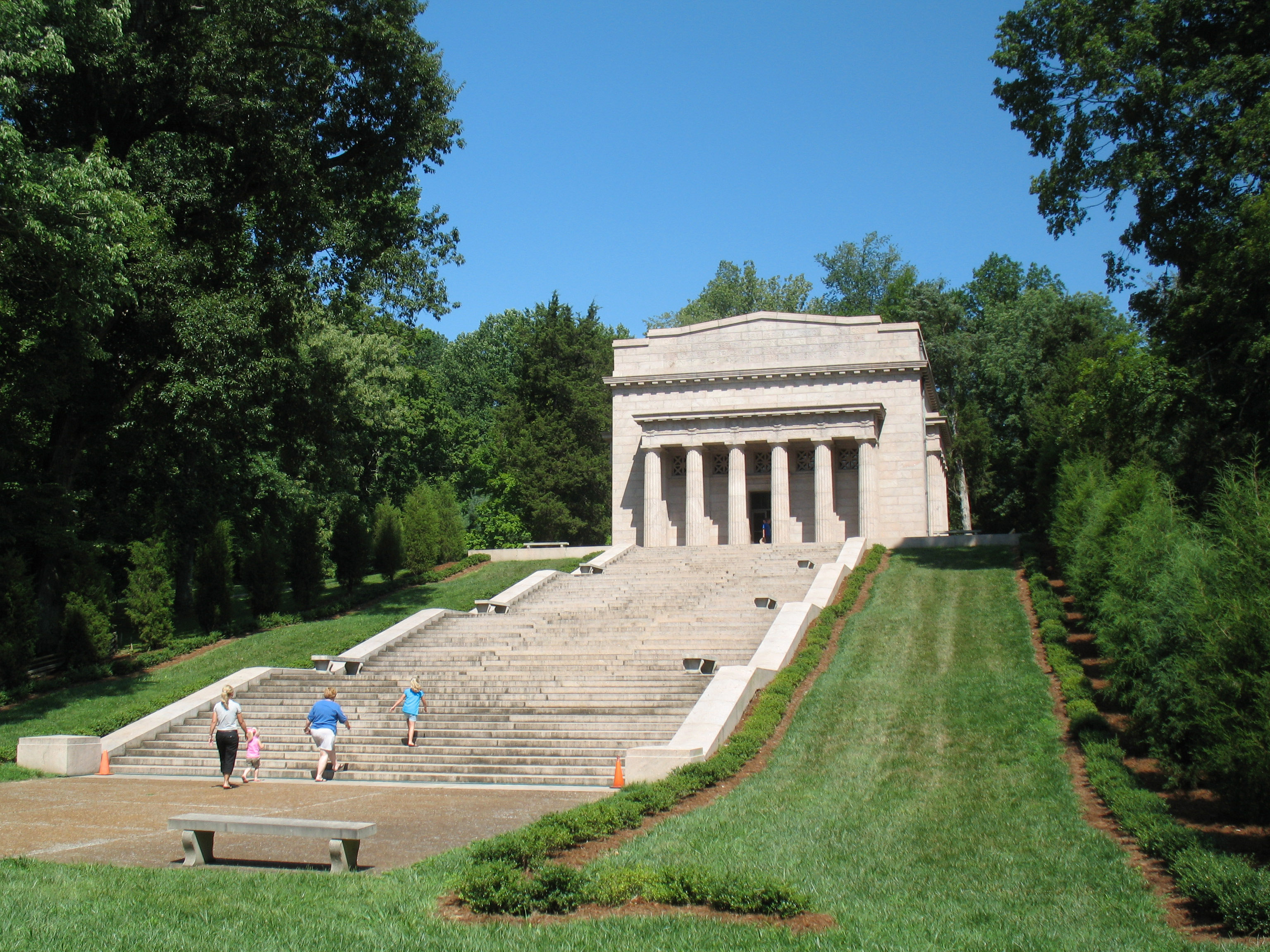
November 9, 1911: Kentucky monument to Lincoln's birthplace dedicated

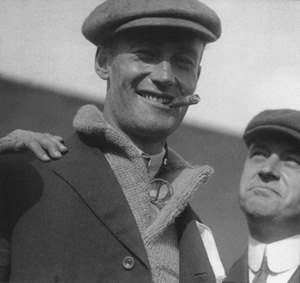
November 5, 1911: Cal Rodgers completes first plane trip across the United States

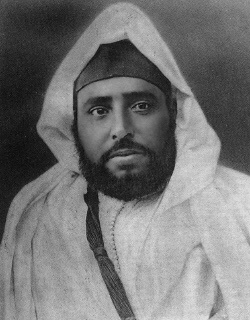
November 9, 1911: Sultan Abdelhafid of Morocco accepts French protectorate rule

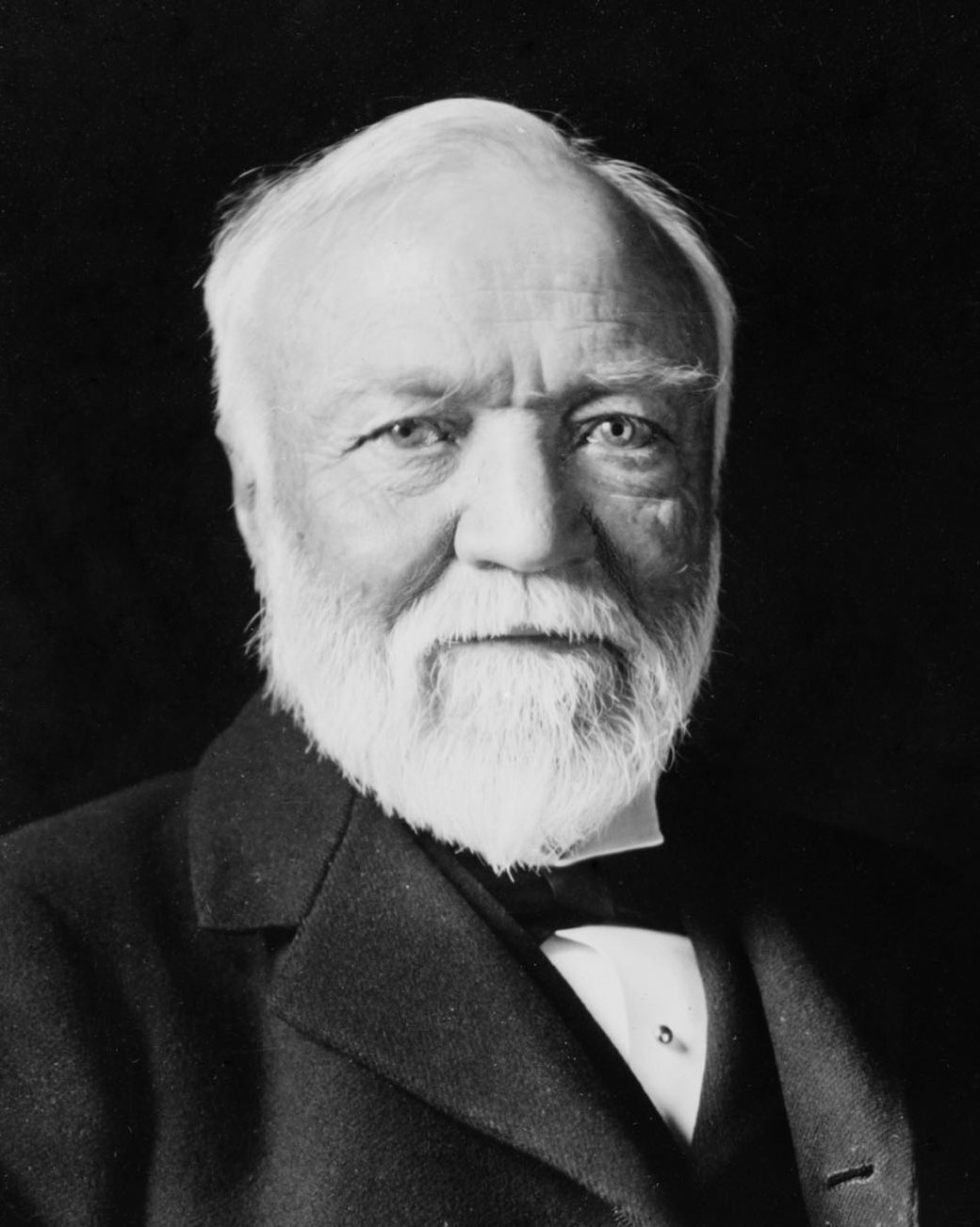
November 10, 1911: Andrew Carnegie charitable bequests pass $200 Million

The following events occurred in November 1911:

== November 1, 1911 (Wednesday) ==
- The first aerial bombardment in history took place when Second Lieutenant Giulio Gavotti of the Italian Army threw three Cipelli hand grenades on Turkish troops at Tagiura in Libya, then flew his Etrich Taube monoplane to Ain and dropped an additional grenade. Nobody was injured in these first bombings.
- Robert Falcon Scott and his party of 12 departed Cape Evans, at 77°38′ south on their quest to become the first persons to reach the South Pole. Roald Amundsen of Norway had begun his trek to the Pole on October 19 and was already at the Ross Ice Shelf at 81° south.
- In the largest American fleet of warships ever assembled, more than 100 U.S. Navy ships sailed on the Hudson River off of New York City for review by Secretary of the Navy George von L. Meyer, led by the USS Connecticut. "This mobilization has demonstrated the preparedness of the American Navy for any emergency." On the same day, most of the U.S. Navy's Pacific Ocean fleet sailed past Los Angeles, with 22 ships and 2 submarines, led by the USS Oregon.
- Pope Pius X issued the papal bull Divino afflatu, requiring that the new breviary be used in all Roman Catholic churches no later than October 23, 1917.
- Chinese Imperial troops were successful in recapturing Hankou for the benefit of the Manchu dynasty Emperor, but a contingent of troops from the Shanxi Province, brought along for assistance, mutinied at Shikiatan. The group massacred 1,000 Manchu civilians, including their own commander and the Governor, his family, and their own general.
- Born:
  - Sidney Wood, American tennis player, Wimbledon champion 1931; in Black Rock, Connecticut (d. 2009).
  - Henri Troyat, Russian-born French novelist, as Lev Aslanovich Tarasov; in Moscow (d. 2007).
  - Slade Cutter, U.S. Navy officer and World War II hero; in Oswego, Illinois (d. 2005).

== November 2, 1911 (Thursday) ==
- U.S. President Taft received a 3,690 gun salute on "the greatest naval day this country has known in time of peace," as he reviewed most of the fleet of the U.S. Navy. The occasion was marred by the death of Seaman Gustav Frey, who fell overboard and drowned.
- Born:
  - Odysseas Elytis, Greek poet who won the Nobel Prize in Literature in 1979; as Odysseas Alepoudellis in Heraklion (d. 1996).
  - Carlos Bulosan, Philippine-born American novelist; in Binalonan.
- Died: Kyrle Bellew, 61, celebrated English actor who was popular in the late 19th and early 20th century.

== November 3, 1911 (Friday) ==
- The Chevrolet Motor Company was incorporated by former General Motors Chairman William C. Durant, to begin manufacture of an inexpensive automobile that had been designed by race car driver Louis Chevrolet. The Chevrolet would prove so successful that Durant would be able to acquire sufficient GM stock to regain control of that company.
- Shanghai was taken over by rebels, led by Chen Qimei, without resistance.
- Prince Chun, the regent for his young son, the Emperor of China, issued an edict accepting the National Assembly's 19 basic points for a new Constitution. The reform, which would have permitted the Emperor to remain on the throne in a constitutional monarchy in a parliamentary government, came too late to prevent the foundation of a republic.
- Born: Vladimir Ussachevsky, Russian-American composer of electronic music; to Russian parents in the Hailar District of China (d. 1990).
- Died:
  - Norman J. Colman, 84, the first person to ever serve as U.S. Secretary of Agriculture after the U.S. Agricultural Commission was elevated to cabinet status in 1889.
  - Daniel Drawbaugh, 84, who claimed to have invented the telephone, pneumatic tools, hydraulic rams, folding lunchboxes, barrel faucets, self-measuring wrapping machines, coin separators, and a wireless burglar alarm.

== November 4, 1911 (Saturday) ==
- The Agadir Crisis ended with the signing of Franco-German peace treaty at Berlin between German Foreign Minister Alfred von Kiderlen-Waechter and France's Ambassador to Germany, Jules Cambon, ending Germany's threat to go to war over Morocco. Germany withdrew all claims to North Africa, with Morocco being partitioned between France (as a protectorate) and Spain (as the colony the Spanish Sahara). In return, France ceded to Germany 107,270 mi² of the French Congo, as part of Kamerun, and Germany ceded 6,450 mi² of German Kamerun to France as part of Chad. The territorial changes would last only seven years, and after Germany's defeat in World War I, German Kamerun would become French Cameroun and, decades later, the independent nation of Cameroon.
- Piloted by Melvin Vaniman, the dirigible balloon Akron (not to be confused with the 1930s airship USS Akron), was tested in Atlantic City in its first flight, but lost altitude and came down nine miles north at Grassy Bay.
- Born:
  - Charles Assalé, Prime Minister of Cameroon (1960–61) and of East Cameroon (1961–65); in Ebolowa (d. 1999).
  - Dixie Lee Crosby, American actress and first wife of Bing Crosby, as Wilma Winifred Wyatt; in Harriman, Tennessee (d. 1952).

== November 5, 1911 (Sunday) ==
- Calbraith P. Rodgers arrived in Pasadena, California, landing his airplane, the Vin Fiz Flyer at 4:04 pm, to become the first person to fly across the United States. A crowd of 20,000 greeted him, with a large group breaking through police guards to mob him. Reportedly, "hundreds threw hats and caps into the air, and trampled them into the dirt when they fell". He had started in New York City on September 17 and flown 3,220 miles, making 69 stops. Rodgers, who had replaced 98% of the original wood, wire and fabric of the plane during the trip, and had sustained a dozen crashes, would be killed in another crash five months later, on April 3, 1912.
- Giovanni Giolitti, the Prime Minister of Italy, announced the royal decree annexing the Ottoman Empire provinces of Tripoli and Cyrenaica (both part of modern Libya) to the Kingdom of Italy. The decree would be confirmed by the Parliament on February 25, 1912.
- Born: Roy Rogers, American cowboy, singer and actor; as Leonard Slye in Cincinnati (d. 1998).
- Died: Sir Hugh Gilzean-Reid, 75, who published the first halfpenny priced newspaper in Great Britain, the Middlesbrough Daily Gazette.

== November 6, 1911 (Monday) ==
- The first straight pool tournament, using the rules for "14.1 continuous" pocket billiards, was held, with Alfredo De Oro winning. The game, adapted from the 1888 game of continuous pool on the suggestion of champion Jerome Keogh, scored points by the cumulative number of balls sunk.
- Francisco I. Madero was sworn into office as President of Mexico. He left many of the officers of the defeated federales in command, and his attempts at reform would lead to more rebellion. Emiliano Zapata would declare his own revolution three weeks later. Madero and Vice-President José María Pino Suárez would both be assassinated on February 22, 1913.
- Born: Leonhard Goppelt, German-born Biblical interpreter; in Munich (d. 1973).

== November 7, 1911 (Tuesday) ==
- It was announced that Marie Curie had been awarded the Nobel Prize in Chemistry. In 1903, she had been co-winner, with Pierre Curie, for the Nobel Prize in Physics, making her the first person to win a second Nobel Prize, and the first of only two (the other one being Linus Pauling) to have won in two different categories.
- Yuan Shikai was named as the Prime Minister of the Chinese Empire.
- The legislature of the Fujian Province of China voted to declare its independence from the Empire, and joined the Republic of China four days later.
- General Wu Lu-cheng, the Governor-General of the Shaanxi Province, committed suicide after refusing instructions from the Emperor's court to surrender.

== November 8, 1911 (Wednesday) ==
- Arthur Balfour resigned as leader of the Conservative Party and as Leader of the Opposition in the British House of Commons, after being blamed by the B.M.G. ("Balfour Must Go") campaign for not opposing the Parliament Bill.
- João Pinheiro Chagas resigned as Prime Minister of Portugal along with his entire cabinet.
- The legislature of the Anhui Province voted to secede from Imperial China.
- At his basement in St. Louis, inventor Anthony F. Wice tested his idea to generate heat by mixing compressed air and gasoline, after telling his son that he was on the verge of a breakthrough. An explosion killed him instantly.
- Born: Jacob B. Agus, Polish-born American rabbi; as Yakov Dov Agushewitz in Swislocz (now Svislach, Belarus) (d. 1986).

== November 9, 1911 (Thursday) ==
- At Hodgenville, Kentucky, President Taft dedicated the granite temple surrounding a replica of Abraham Lincoln's log cabin. "Few men have come into public prominence who came absolutely from the soil as did Abraham Lincoln," said Taft. "With an illiterate and shiftless father and a mother who, though of education and force, died before he reached youth," said Taft, "his future was dark indeed."
- The Kwangtung Province became the latest to secede from China as the National Assembly at Canton (now Guangzhou) proclaimed a republic.
- Sultan Abdelhafid of Morocco announced that he would consent to the conditions of the Franco-German peace treaty, which provided for French protection and control of all of Morocco's foreign affairs.
- The first, and only, time a November palindrome day occurred in the 20th century was on this date (11-9-1911). (Note that this is a seven-digit palindrome day which can also be interpreted as the full date number of January 19, 1911, if written as 1-19-1911 instead of 11-9-1911). The next one would occur on November 2, 2011 (11-02-2011).
- Died: Howard Pyle, 76, American artist described as "the father of American magazine illustration" and "the most successful of American artists."

== November 10, 1911 (Friday) ==
- Manchu troops in Nanjing, following the command of their Tartar general, carried out what a reporter described as "a scene of fire, rapine, desolation and butchery unrecorded in modern history" attacking the Chinese residents there indiscriminately, murdering "the aged, the young, and babies in arms." Any rebel who had cut off his queue was beheaded; even the simple act of wearing white clothing (associated with the rebellion), or foreign clothing, was cause for murder.
- Andrew Carnegie donated $25,000,000 (equivalent to $500,000,000 in 2011) to the Carnegie Corporation to carry on his philanthropic work. His total bequests up until that time were counted as $208,233,000; of that, $50,935,000 had endowed "Carnegie libraries".
- King George V turned over British royal authority to a four-member Commission, empowered to act on his behalf during his absence. The group consisted of the King's cousin, Prince Arthur of Connaught (who, at 28, was the only adult male member of the British royal family in the U.K.); the Archbishop of Canterbury (Randall Davidson); the Lord Chancellor (Robert Reid, 1st Earl Loreburn); and the Lord President of the Council (John Morley). The King and his wife, Queen Mary departed Portsmouth the next day en route to India, where they were Emperor and Empress.

== November 11, 1911 (Saturday) ==
- The Whirlpool Corporation, a worldwide manufacturer and marketer of home appliances, was founded by Emory Upton, his nephew Louis Upton, and investor Lowell Bassford in St. Joseph, Michigan as the Upton Machine Company. The initial product made by the Uptons was an electric washing machine, and by 1945, the company would introduced its "Whirlpool" automatic washing machine. Upton Machine would change its name to Whirlpool Corporation on April 20, 1950.
- Kaiser Wilhelm II rebuked his son, the Crown Prince for openly siding with the opposition to Germany's policy on Morocco, and transferred him to a job in Danzig.
- The German battleship SMS Kaiserin was launched at Kiel.
- A tornado struck Janesville, Wisconsin, killing 20 residents.
- The French film Zigomar premiered in Japan, and became an unexpected hit, particularly among kids who had never seen violence portrayed in a theatre production. Later, when Japanese producers would begin making their own Zigomar action thrillers, "scores of juvenile offenders were produced", and Japan's Home Ministry would respond with strict censorship.
- The temperature in Oklahoma City stood at 83 °F in the afternoon, until a cold front arrived, dropping the mercury dramatically to 17 °F in before midnight.
- In the last years of Austro-Hungarian rule, the city of Visoko (now part of the Republic of Bosnia and Herzegovina) was almost completely burned down by fire, which was started by accident.
- Born:
  - Rubén Cobos, American linguist, folklorist, singer, and professor (d. 2010)
  - Patric Knowles, British actor, as Reginald Lawrence Knowles in Horsforth (d. 1995)

== November 12, 1911 (Sunday) ==
- President Taft returned to the White House after having been away from the nation's capital for a record 87 consecutive days.
- Born:
  - Chad Varah, British Anglican priest and humanitarian, founder (in 1953) of The Samaritans, and the first suicide hotline; in Barton-upon-Humber, Lincolnshire (d. 2007)
  - Buck Clayton, American jazz trumpet player; in Parsons, Kansas (d. 1991)

== November 13, 1911 (Monday) ==
- The British Conservative Party selected Bonar Law as their new leader (and Leader of the Opposition), a compromise choice after both Austen Chamberlain and Walter Long were both rejected.
- The U.S. Supreme Court ruled that motion pictures could not be adapted from books and plays without consent of the original authors, upholding an appellate court decision, in Kalem Company v. Harper & Brothers, arising from the Kalem Studios 1907 production of Ben Hur.
- Born: John Jordan "Buck" O'Neil, Negro American League baseball player and manager for the Kansas City Monarchs, and later the first black coach in Major League Baseball; in Carrabelle, Florida (d. 2006)
- Died: Nehemiah D. Sperry, 84, former U.S. Congressman for Connecticut (1895-1911) who was known as "the Father of Rural Free Delivery"

== November 14, 1911 (Tuesday) ==
- Pinellas County, Florida was created from west Hillsborough County.
- The German government announced that the approval of the Reichstag would be necessary for any treaties changing boundaries of any part of the German Empire.
- Maurice Bienaime and Rene Rumpelmayer became the first persons to fly an airplane non-stop for 1,000 miles, covering 1,056 miles in 16 1/2 hours.

== November 15, 1911 (Wednesday) ==
- Yuan Shikai accepted the nomination to become Prime Minister of China and set up a cabinet the next day.

== November 16, 1911 (Thursday) ==
- The American Tobacco Company was reorganized with approval of the U.S. Circuit Court of Appeals in New York. The corporation, which had held 92% of the market share of U.S. tobacco sales, was split into four smaller entities: Lorillard Tobacco Company (15% share, Kool); R. J. Reynolds Tobacco Company (20%, maker of Camel cigarettes); Liggett & Myers (28%; Chesterfield, L & M); and a smaller American Tobacco (38%, Lucky Strike). New competition would come in 1919 from Philip Morris, Inc., most famous for Marlboro cigarettes.
- An earthquake struck Switzerland and Germany at 10:27 pm local time.
- Augusto de Vasconcelos became the new Prime Minister of Portugal.
- Born William 'Si' Redd, American casino games developer described as "King of Video Poker", a son of sharecroppers who became a multimillionaire in gaming; near Union, Mississippi (d. 2003)

== November 17, 1911 (Friday) ==
- The Omega Psi Phi fraternity, first black fraternity at a historically black college, was founded by three Howard University undergraduates (Edgar Amos Love, Oscar James Cooper and Frank Coleman) and Professor Ernest Everett Just. As of its 100th anniversary, it had more than 700 chapters in nine nations.
- The United States Navy temporarily abandoned the use of fish names for submarine classification, renaming the Adder, Viper, Octopus and Narwhal class subs as A, B, C and D class, respectively. Names would be revived in 1931.

== November 18, 1911 (Saturday) ==
- The Princeton Tigers, unbeaten with a record of 7–0–2, wrapped up their season at New Haven, Connecticut, defeating the 7-1-0 Yale Bulldogs by a score of 6–3. The Helms Athletic Foundation, which would be founded in 1936, would later declare, retroactively, that Princeton had been the best team of the 1911 college football season.
- Thirty miners at the Bottom Creek Coal and Coke Company died in an explosion at Vivian, West Virginia in McDowell County.
- Train robbers in France attacked three cars carrying $600,000 worth of gifts, breaking in through the roofs after the cars departed from Paris en route to Lyons. The theft was discovered when the train stopped at Mâcon.

== November 19, 1911 (Sunday) ==
- Ramón Cáceres, the President of the Dominican Republic, was assassinated in Santo Domingo. Caceres was attacked by assailants while riding in his coach on a public road. His murder was plotted by Luis Tejera, a "Jimenista" who supported former President Juan Isidro Jimenes Pereyra, while Caceres had been a "Horacista" and follower of former President Horacio Vásquez. Caceres was succeeded by another Horacista, Eladio Victoria. Increasing instability would lead to U.S. troops occupying the Dominican Republic in 1916.
- Guglielmo Marconi demonstrated an advance in wireless radio transmission, telegraphing a greeting to the New York Times between two Marconi stations located 4,000 miles apart. Marconi's signal went from the newest station in Italy (at Coltano, near Pisa) was sent to a receiver at Glace Bay, Nova Scotia. The previous record had been 2,250 miles. The Marconigram read "My best greetings transmitted by wireless telegraph from Italy to America—- G. Marconi, Pisa. 5:47 P.M."
- Born:
  - William Attaway, African-American novelist and songwriter; in Greenville, Mississippi (d. 1986)
  - Virginia Barckley, pioneering nurse in oncology; in Burlington, New Jersey (d. 1993)

== November 20, 1911 (Monday) ==
- Texas Governor Oscar Colquitt ordered all Mexican rebels in Texas to leave within 48 hours, and deployed the Texas Rangers to the border to enforce the order.
- Gustav Mahler's symphony, Das Lied von der Erde, was given its first performance, six months after the composer's death. Conductor Bruno Walter led the orchestra in the performance at Munich.
- The Japanese Antarctic Expedition set off from Sydney, and Dr. Mawson's expedition set off from Adelaide.
- Born:
  - David Seymour, Polish war photographer nicknamed "Chim"; as Dawid Szymin in Warsaw (killed 1956)
  - Jean Shiley, American athlete who won the 1932 Olympic gold medal for the women's high jump against Babe Didrikson; in Harrisburg, Pennsylvania (d. 1998)

== November 21, 1911 (Tuesday) ==
- After four days of working their way up the Axel Heiberg Glacier, Roald Amundsen and his party were able to reach the plateau of the Transantarctic Mountains. Amundsen named that part of the range between the Ross Ice Shelf and the plateau after the reigning Queen Consort of Norway, christening them the Queen Maud Mountains.

== November 22, 1911 (Wednesday) ==
- Russian troops invaded Iran, with several hundred occupying Rasht, the largest port on the Persian side of the Caspian Sea. The conditions given for the troops' withdrawal included the dismissal of W. Morgan Shuster as the Persian Treasurer, and an agreement not to employ foreign advisers without the approval of Russia and Britain.
- Born: Ernie Caceres, American jazz musician; in Rockport, Texas (d. 1971)

== November 23, 1911 (Thursday) ==
- The collapse of a railway bridge in France, near Montreuil-Bellay, killed 30 people. The cars carried about 100 passengers who were on their way from Angers to Poitiers, and sank in the Thouet River. Some persons, who had escaped the cars before they sank, were swept away in the flood-swollen waters.
- As the Italo-Turkish War continued, Italy informed the other European powers that it would send its Navy into Turkish waters to create a blockade of the Dardanelles.
- Wu Tingfang, a leader of the Republican revolution in China, informed foreign diplomats in Nanjing an attack would be held off for three days, in order to give foreign residents a chance to evacuate before November 26.
- Died: Bernard Tancred, 47, South African cricketer, died after a short illness.

== November 24, 1911 (Friday) ==
- At the Hotel Gotham in Manhattan, Texas businessman Edward M. House had his first meeting with New Jersey Governor Woodrow Wilson, and began the process for a successful campaign to elect Wilson to the office of President of the United States in 1912
- After seven years, the secret articles of the Anglo-French declaration of 1904 (which concerned Egypt and Morocco) were published.
- A boiler explosion at the J. Bibby & Sons oil cake mills in Liverpool killed 27 people and injured 100.
- Born: Erik Bergman, Finnish classical music composer; in Nykarleby (d. 2006)

== November 25, 1911 (Saturday) ==
- Emiliano Zapata proclaimed the Plan de Ayala, blaming revolutionary-turned-President Francisco I. Madero for failing to redistribute land to Mexico's peasants.
- Born: Roelof Frankot, Dutch painter; in Meppel (d. 1984)

== November 26, 1911 (Sunday) ==
- In an elaborate ceremony at the ancestral temple, the Regent for China's Emperor took an oath to uphold the 19 Articles of the new Chinese constitution, stating "Following the fall of the sacred dynasty I accept the advice of the national assembly. I swear to uphold the nineteen constitutional articles and organize a parliament, excluding the nobles from administrative posts. I and my descendants will adhere to it forever. Your heavenly spirits will see and understand." Bombardment of Nanjing began the same day.
- Six members of the family of Norbert Randall of Lafayette, Louisiana, were killed in their beds by an axe murderer, continuing a string of similar killings that had already claimed eleven people in January and five more in April. Police arrested an African-American woman, Clementine Bernabet, but would release her after nine more killings took place during her incarceration.
- Born: Gilbert F. White, American geographer described as "The Father of Floodplain Management"; in Chicago (d. 2006)
- Died:
  - Komura Jutarō, 56, Foreign Minister of Japan 1901 to 1906, died of tuberculosis
  - Paul Lafargue, 69, French philosopher who wrote The Right to Be Lazy, along with his wife died in a double suicide

== November 27, 1911 (Monday) ==
- Hurling rotten fruit and vegetables, Irish-born Americans protested what they perceived as insulting stereotypes of Irish people, shouting insults and throwing produce at the actors during the New York City opening of John Millington Synge's production of The Playboy of the Western World
- Spanish commanders in the Sahara agreed to terms with 65 Rif chiefs.
- Born:
  - David Merrick (stage name for David Lee Margulois), American theater producer and four time Tony Award winner known for Hello, Dolly!); in St. Louis (d. 2000)
  - Fe del Mundo, Filipino pediatrician and National Scientist of the Philippines; in Intramuros, Manila (d. 2011)

== November 28, 1911 (Tuesday) ==
- Renowned lawyer Clarence Darrow was accused of attempting to bribe a juror after a detective whom he had hired, Bert Franklin, was arrested in Los Angeles for offering a juror $4,000 to bring about a hung jury in the trial of the McNamara brothers for the bombing of the Los Angeles Times building. After Franklin testified that Darrow had ordered him to attempt bribery, Darrow was indicted on two separate charges. He would be acquitted in both trials.
- Born:
  - Václav Renč, Czech poet, dramatist and translator; in Wodochod (now Vodochody), Austro-Hungarian Empire (d. 1973)
  - Tawfiq Yusuf Awwad, Lebanese novelist; in Bhersaf (d. 1989)

== November 29, 1911 (Wednesday) ==
- Russia delivered its ultimatum to Persia, giving the government 48 hours to either dismiss American businessman W. Morgan Shuster from his post as Persia's Treasurer General, or to see Tehran invaded.

== November 30, 1911 (Thursday) ==
- In the annual Thanksgiving Day college football game at Jackson between Mississippi and Mississippi State (at that time Mississippi A & M), fifty people were injured when a set of bleachers collapsed, throwing 1,000 spectators to the ground. Mississippi Lt. Governor Luther Manship and Secretary of State J.N. Power were hurt slightly in the tumble.
- The keel for the biggest White Star Line ship ever, HMHS Britannic, was laid down in Belfast. The ship would be launched on February 26, 1914, and soon called into World War One service, sinking on November 21, 1916, after striking a mine.
- Born: Tamura Taijiro, Japanese novelist; in Yokkaichi, Mie Prefecture (d. 1983)
