= Lavender and Old Lace (film) =

1921 film

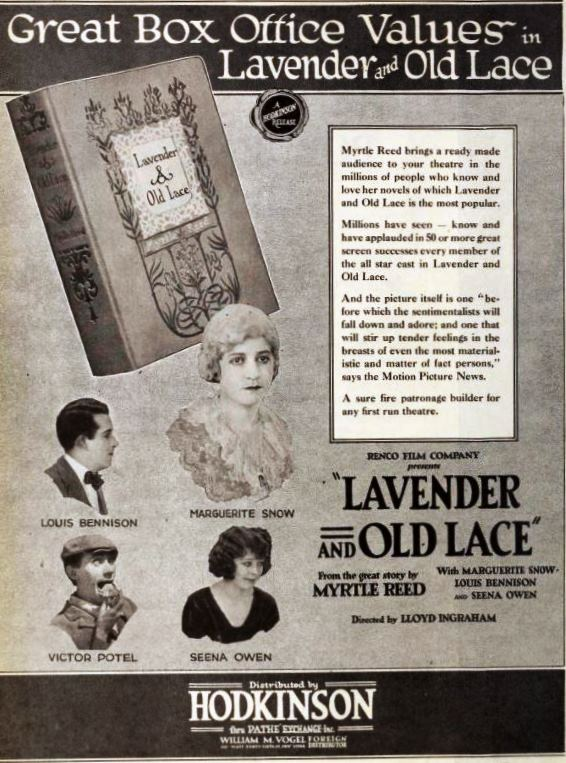
- Advertisement for Lavender and Old Lace on page 18 of the July 2, 1921 issue of Exhibitors Herald
- Directed by: Lloyd Ingraham
- Based on: Lavender and Old Lace by Myrtle Reed
- Starring: Marguerite Snow; Seena Owen; Louis Bennison; Victor Potel; Zella Ingraham
- Cinematography: Ross Fisher
- Production company: Renco Film Company
- Distributed by: W. W. Hodkinson Corporation
- Release date: June 1921
- Running time: 6 reels
- Country: United States
- Languages: Silent film (English intertitles)

Lavender and Old Lace is a 1921 American silent drama film directed by Lloyd Ingraham and starring Marguerite Snow, Seena Owen, Louis Bennison, Victor Potel, and Zella Ingraham. It is based on the 1902 novel of the same name by Myrtle Reed. The film was released by W. W. Hodkinson in June 1921.

== Cast ==
- Marguerite Snow as Mary Ainslie
- Seena Owen as Ruth Thorne
- Louis Bennison as Captain Charles Winfield / Carl Winfield
- Victor Potel as Joe Pendleton
- Zella Ingraham as Hepsey
- Lillian Elliott as Jane Hathaway
- James Corrigan as Jimmy Ball

== Preservation ==
It is unknown whether the film survives as no copies have been located, it is likely that it has been lost.
