= Old Rose and Silver =

1909 novel by Myrtle Reed

- First edition cover
- Author: Myrtle Reed
- Language: English
- Publisher: G. P. Putnam's Sons
- Publication date: 1909
- Media type: Print

Old Rose and Silver is a novel by Myrtle Reed first published in 1909.

== Summary ==
The novel follows the lives of Rose and her widowed Aunt, Madame Francesca Bernard, along with young visitor and cousin Isabel, whose lives are changed by the return of an old friend and neighbour Colonel Kent, and his grown son, Allison. Other characters that help shape their lives in significant ways are the Crosby twins, unconventional and uninhibited youths that set society at naught, and an unconventional doctor who specializes in the impossible. Through the limited "wide-scope" descriptions the reader is not sure of the historical setting or even in which decade it's set, but it helps to understand the focus of the story; after all it's about their own little world, and how their own hearts and lives fit together in the tight confines of their town, their garden, their friendships and lives.
