= A Weaver of Dreams =

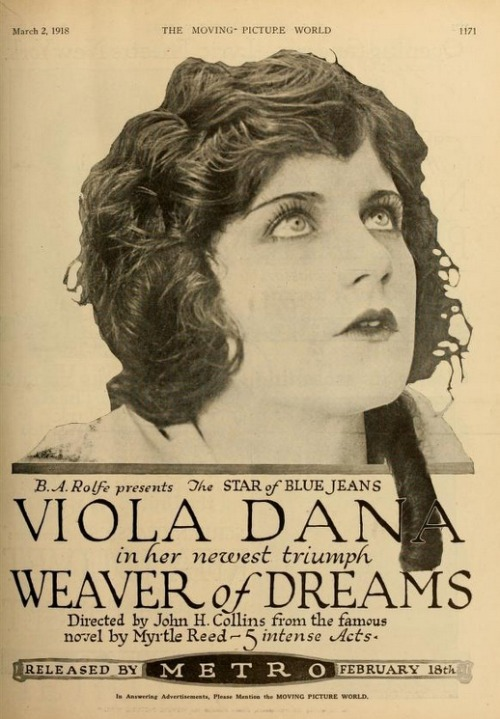
- Directed by: John H. Collins
- Written by: John H. Collins; William Parker; Myrtle Reed
- Produced by: B. A. Rolfe
- Starring: Viola Dana
- Cinematography: John Arnold
- Distributed by: Metro Pictures
- Release date: February 18, 1918
- Running time: 5 reels
- Country: United States
- Language: Silent..English titles

A Weaver of Dreams is a lost silent film directed by Edison's John H. Collins and released under Metro Films February 18, 1918, at the height of Mr. Collins' career. It was the 36th of 41 films credited to his direction. The young director succumbed to Spanish Influenza and died later that year; October 23, 1918, at the age of 28. The film stars his actress wife Virginia Flugrath, who is best known by her screen name Viola Dana. The screenplay, written by John H. Collins and William Parker, is an adaptation of Myrtle Reed's (1874-1911) posthumously published novel A Weaver of Dreams (1911); the author took her own life earlier that year on August 17, 1911.

== Plot ==
The plot concerns Viola Dana's character; Judith Sylvester, who is niece to a wealthy invalid. Confident in her relationship, Judith introduces her beau to the niece of another invalid. Over time he transfers his affection to the other girl; possibly with ulterior motives. Judith does little to intervene, saying, "What is not mine, I do not want." She locks herself away in her house and dreams of a "perfect" lover. Perfection to her is the gentleman who once courted her dying aunt, to which his love letters bear testament. As Judith wallows in unrequited love, she discovers that the writer of her aunt's love letters is the uncle of her romantic rival, Margery Gordon, played by actress Mildred Davis. As the film continues, her aunt is reunited with her long lost love and poor Judith is left alone with nothing but dreams of perfection, but she remains hopeful.

== Cast ==
- Viola Dana - Judith Sylvester
- Clifford Bruce - Carter Keith
- Mildred Davis - Margery Gordon
- Russell Simpson - Martin Chandler
- Clarissa Selwynne - Cynthia Bancroft
- Vera Lewis - Aunt Hattie Taylor
