= Clare Osborne Reed =

American musician

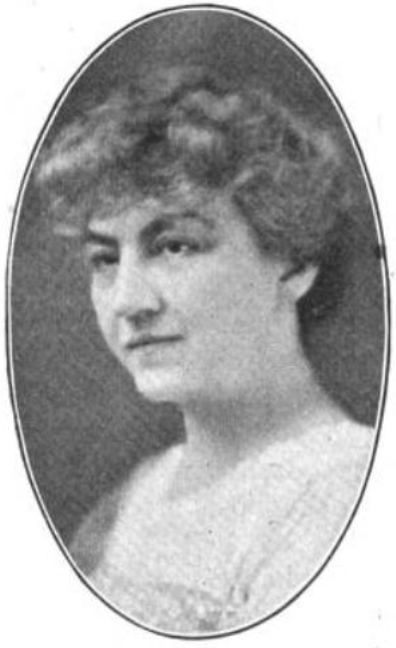
- Clare Osborne Reed, from a 1921 publication
- Born: Clare Osborne; December 28, 1864; Plymouth, Indiana, U.S.
- Died: December 31, 1954 (age 90); Tryon, North Carolina, U.S.
- Occupation(s): Musician, music educator
- Relatives: Elizabeth Armstrong Reed (mother-in-law); Myrtle Reed (sister-in-law)

Clare Osborne Reed (December 28, 1864 – December 31, 1954) was an American musician and music educator, based in Chicago. She was founder and president of the Columbia School of Music, and taught piano.

== Early life and education ==
Osborne was born in Plymouth, Indiana, and raised in Chicago, the daughter of John George Osborne and Marilda Jane Boyd Osborne. Her father was a minister and a lawyer; he died in 1873. She studied music at Chicago Musical College and in Europe, including studies in piano with Theodor Leschetizky and in composition with Karel Navrátil.

== Career ==
From 1901 to 1930, Osborne was founder, artistic director, and president of the Columbia School of Music in Chicago. In 1930, she resigned as the school's president, but continued teaching classes there. She was a member of the Society of American Musicians, the Illinois Music Teachers Association, the Chicago Political Equality League, and Mu Phi Epsilon.

== Publications ==
- Constructive Harmony and Improvisation (1927)

== Personal life ==
Osborne married surgeon and writer Charles Bert Reed in 1892. They had two daughters, Isabel and Betty. Her husband died in 1940, and she died in 1954, at the age of 90, in Tryon, North Carolina. Her mother-in-law Elizabeth Armstrong Reed and her sister-in-law Myrtle Reed were noted writers.
