= William Hutchins (disambiguation) =

William Hutchins (1792–1841) was an English churchman and academic.

William Hutchins may also refer to:

- William Henry Hutchins (1843–1898), Canadian merchant and political figure
- William John Hutchins (born 1939), English linguist and information scientist
- Will Hutchins (born 1930), American actor
- William J. Hutchins (1813–1884), businessman and mayor of Houston
- William M. Hutchins (born 1944), American academic, author and translator of contemporary Arabic literature
- William James Hutchins, President of Berea College in Kentucky (1920–1939), father of Robert Maynard Hutchins

== See also ==
- William Hutchings (disambiguation)
