= Elizabeth Armstrong Reed =

Sophia Elizabeth Armstrong Reed
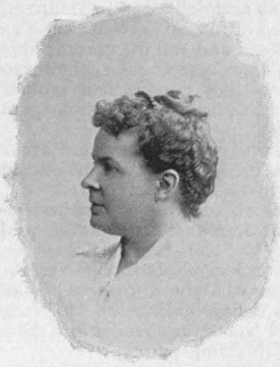
- Born: May 16, 1842; Winthrop, Maine
- Died: June 18, 1915 (aged 73); Chicago, Illinois
- Occupations: Author, editor
- Children: Myrtle Reed, Earl Howell, Dr. Charles B. Reed
- Relatives: Clare Osborne Reed (daughter-in-law)
- Writing career
- Notable works: Hindu Literature, or, The Ancient Books of India

Sophia Elizabeth Reed (née Armstrong; May 16, 1842 – June 18, 1915) was an American oriental scholar and author whose books were widely used as college textbooks in various universities worldwide for Oriental studies. Hers were, at the time, the only works by a woman accepted by the Philosophical Society of Great Britain.

== Biography ==
Reed was born in Winthrop, Maine.

She was married to Hiram Vaughn Reed, an Age to Come (One Faith) preacher and newspaper publisher, in 1860, meeting him at a religious debate in Buchanan, Michigan. Reed was the mother of author Myrtle Reed, and two sons, Earl Howell and Charles B. Reed.

In 1893, Reed was chairman of the Woman's Congress of Philology at Chicago and in 1896 became an editor of the Course of Universal Literature. Reed served two terms as the president of the Illinois Woman's Press Association 1894 (January) until 1896 (June) and 1902 (June) until 1904 (June). She received honorary degrees from Northwestern and Illinois Wesleyan universities and Bethany College.

Elizabeth Armstrong Reed died in Chicago on June 18, 1915.

== Selected works ==
- The Bible Triumphant (1866)
- Earnest Words for Honest Sceptics (1876)
- Hindu Literature; or the Ancient Books of India (1891)
- Persian Literature, Ancient and Modern (1893)
- Primitive Buddhism: Its Origins and Teachings (1896)
- Daniel Webster: A Character Sketch (1899)
- Hinduism in Europe and America (1914)
