= October 1911 =

Month of 1911

<<	October 1911					>>
Su	Mo	Tu	We	Th	Fr	Sa
1	2	3	4	5	6	7
8	9	10	11	12	13	14
15	16	17	18	19	20	21
22	23	24	25	26	27	28
29	30	31

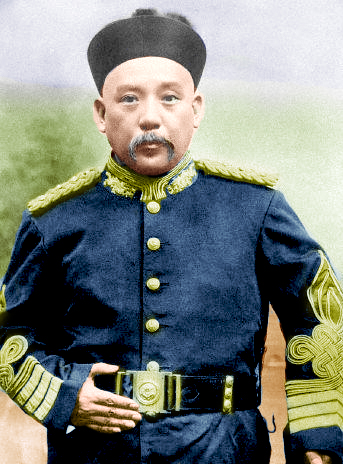
October 27, 1911: Yuan Shikai sent to stop rebellion in China

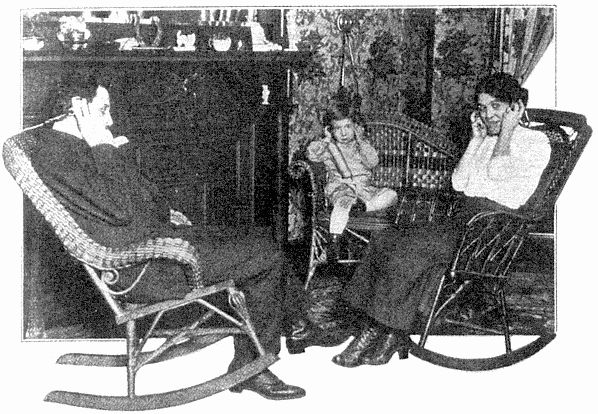
October 23, 1911: Experimental cable entertainment and news service launched in United States

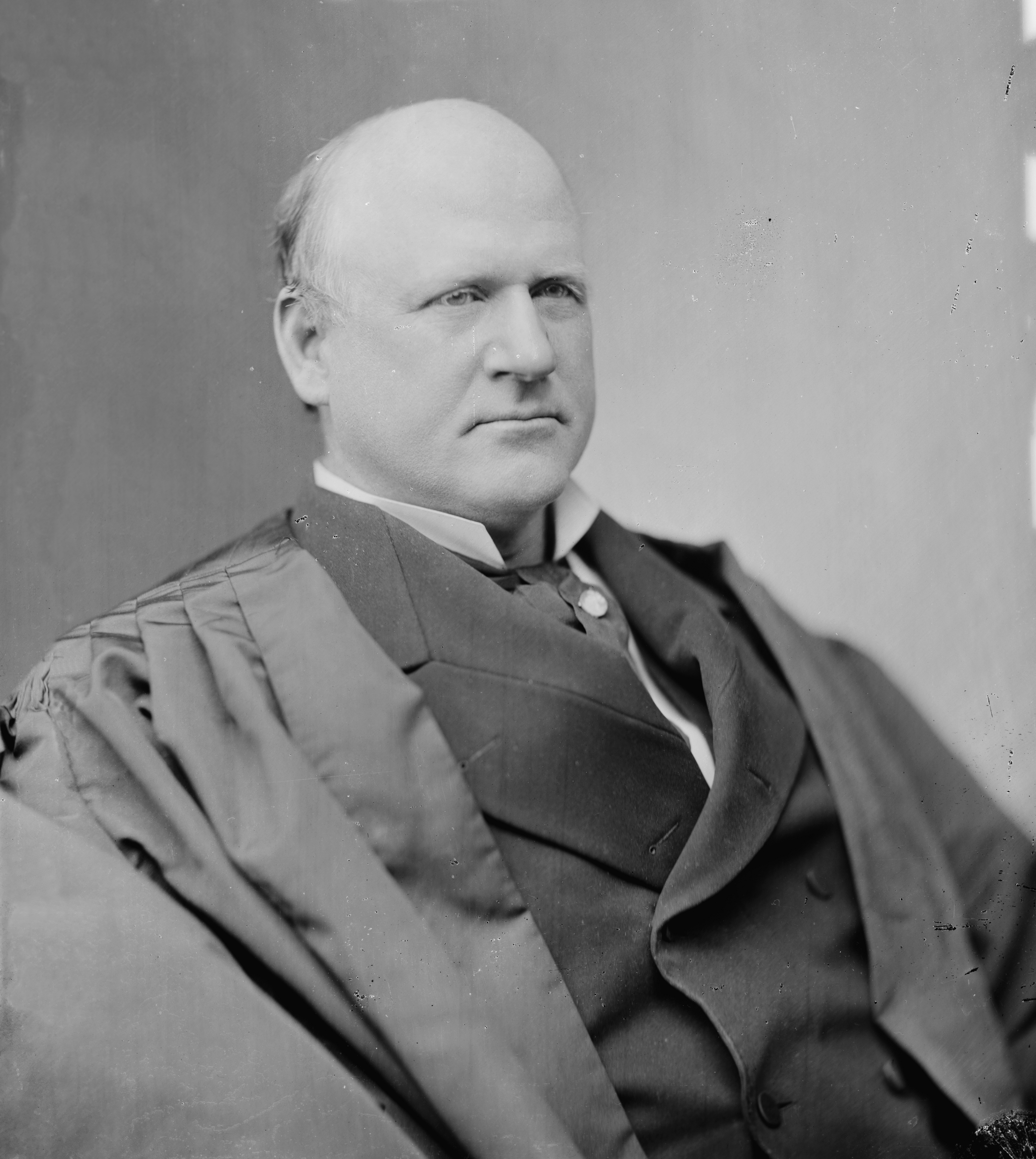
Justice John Marshall Harlan dies at 78

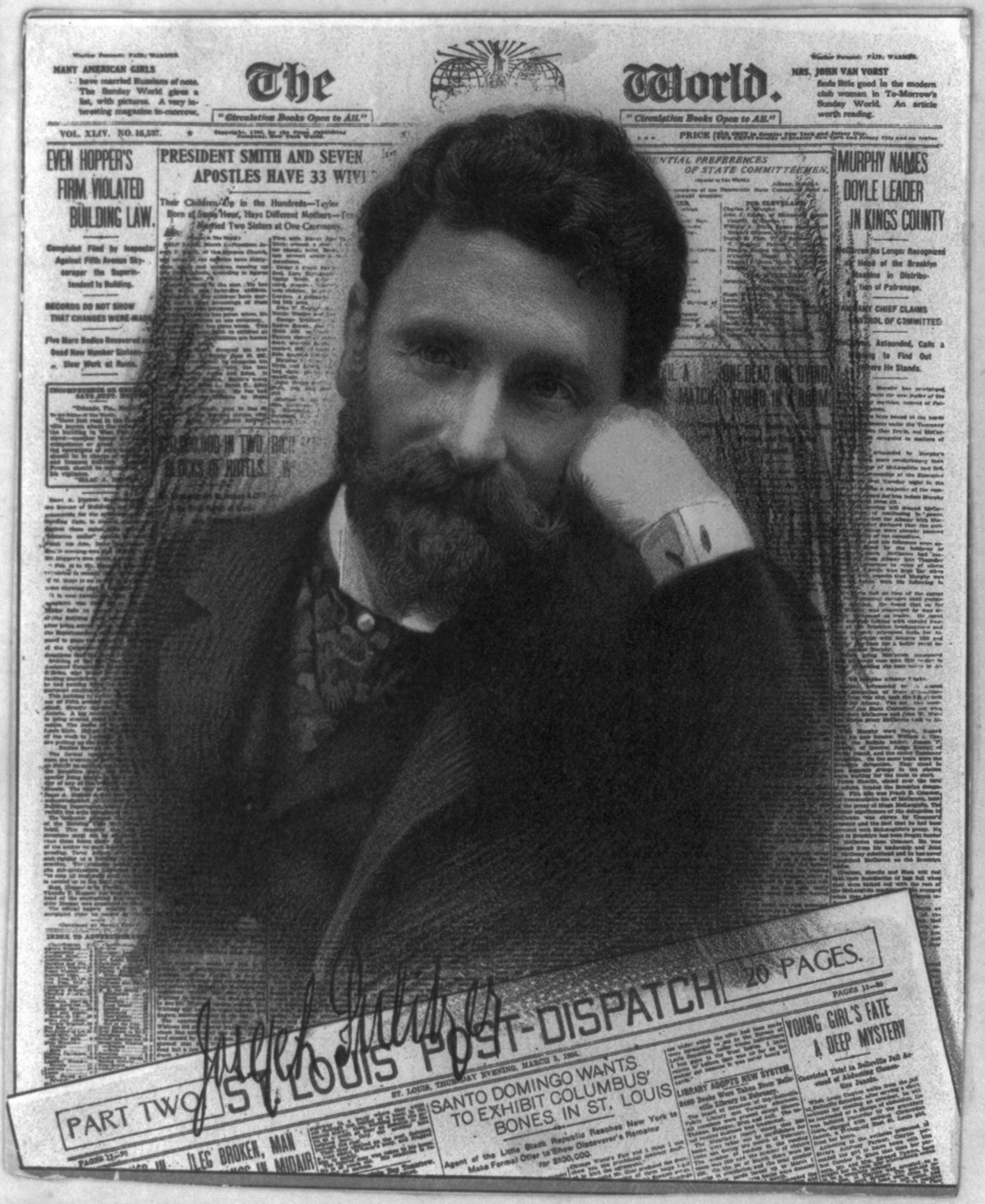
October 29, 1911: Newspaper magnate Joseph Pulitzer dies at 64

The following events occurred in October 1911:

== October 1, 1911 (Sunday) ==
- In the first elections in Mexico since the 1910 revolution, Francisco I. Madero was elected President by a landslide. Madero won 95% of the vote, though Francisco Gomez and Emilio Vasquez Gomez also on the ballot, and there was a close race for the Vice-President. Madero's running mate, José Pino Suárez and interim President Francisco León de la Barra were among five vice-presidential candidates. The vote was described as "the freest election in Mexican history" up to that time. Madero would take office on November 6.
- The Dutch cargo ship SS Ixion caught fire and sank near the coast of the Netherlands East Indies (now Indonesia) after departing from Tanjung Priok on a voyage to Amsterdam. Of its crew of 47, there were 24 who went down with the ship while 23 survivors were rescued by the British steamer Good Hope.
- Born: Wei-Liang Chow, Chinese mathematician, developer of the Chow coordinates in algebraic geometry; in Shanghai (d. 1995).
- Died: Wilhelm Dilthey, 77, German historian and philosopher.

== October 2, 1911 (Monday) ==
- East Tennessee State Normal School, now East Tennessee State University, began operation in Johnson City, Tennessee, with 29 students registering on the first day.
- All 20 members of the crew of the steamer Hatfield were drowned after the ship collided with another boat, the Glasgow, and sank in the North Sea. The Hatfield had been responding to a call for assistance from the Glasgow.
- Born: Jack Finney, American novelist; in Milwaukee (d. 1995).
- Died:
  - U.S. Navy Rear Admiral Winfield Scott Schley, 71, hero of the Battle of Santiago Bay during the Spanish–American War.
  - Cromwell Dixon, Jr., 19, American aviator, two days after winning a $10,000 prize for becoming the first person to fly across the North American Continental Divide. Dixon was a guest at the Inter-State Fair in Spokane, Washington, and crashed in a downdraft.

== October 3, 1911 (Tuesday) ==
- After giving residents of Tripoli three days notice to evacuate during its war against the Ottoman Empire, Italy began a blockade of the Libyan city and heavy bombardment. At 2:00 p.m., with the Turkish commander still refusing to surrender, Admiral Luigi Faravelli ordered his ships to begin shelling the city at 3:40 p.m.
- Born: Yrjo von Grönhagen; Finnish folklorist (d. 2003).
- Died: Kazuo Hatoyama, 55, Japanese politician.

== October 4, 1911 (Wednesday) ==
- The first viable escalator, designed by Charles Seeberger, began operation at the Earl's Court Underground Station in London.
- The first railway from Canton (Guangzhou to Hong Kong) was put into service.
- Sir Almroth Wright, who had developed a vaccine against typhoid fever, began inoculation of 50,000 gold miners with an anti-pneumonia vaccine; by 1915, discovered to be a failure because of the various forms of pneumococci—at least 90 identified. Some of his colleagues referred to him as "Sir Almost Right."
- Iran's Parliament, the Majlis, instructed Treasurer W. Morgan Shuster to confiscate the property of Malek Mansur Mirza, younger brother of the former Shah, as punishment for supporting the recent counter-revolution. On October 9, when treasury officials were sent to inventory the property, they were blocked by Russian troops on order of the Russian consul-general, Ivan Pokhitonov, prompting a standoff between Russian and Persian troops.
- The Qing dynasty rulers of China adopted the musical composition "Cup of Solid Gold" (Gǒng Jīn'ōu) as the Empire's first official national anthem. Six days later, however, the Wuchang Uprising took place and the anthem was never publicly performed.
- Died: Dr. Joseph Bell, 74, Scottish surgeon who was Arthur Conan Doyle's inspiration for Sherlock Holmes.

== October 5, 1911 (Thursday) ==
- At a session of the Reichsrat in Vienna, two anarchists attempted to assassinate the Austrian Minister of Justice, Viktor von Hochenburger. After bringing a gun into the gallery, Nikolaus Njegus fired four shots at the ministerial benches without injuring anyone.
- Born:
  - Brian O'Nolan, Irish novelist; in Strabane, County Tyrone (d. 1966).
  - Son Sann, Prime Minister of Cambodia (1967-1968, 1982–1991); in Phnom Penh (d. 2000).
  - Vereen Bell, American novelist; in Cairo, Georgia (killed in battle, 1944).
  - Forrest Bess, American artist; in Bay City, Texas (d. 1977).

== October 6, 1911 (Friday) ==
- Karl Staaff became the new Prime Minister of Sweden, forming a cabinet from fellow members of the Liberal party that had won election on September 27.
- After holding his last cabinet meeting, Sir Wilfrid Laurier formally resigned as Canadian Prime Minister, in favor of Robert L. Borden, who was sworn in four days later.
- Born: David T. Griggs, American geologist described as "the father of modern rock mechanics"; in Columbus, Ohio (d. 1974).

== October 7, 1911 (Saturday) ==
- Three days after a botched train robbery, Elmer McCurdy, 31, was shot and killed by lawmen in Oklahoma. McCurdy would achieve fame 65 years later. In December 1976, a TV crew discovered that a dummy on display in an amusement park in Long Beach, California, was actually McCurdy's mummified body. McCurdy would finally receive a burial in Guthrie, Oklahoma, in 1977.
- Rear Admiral Borea d'Olmo of the Italian Navy was appointed as the Governor of Tripoli.
- Born:
  - Jo Jones, American jazz drummer; in Chicago (d. 1985).
  - Danielle Georgette Reddé, French resistance fighter in World War II (d. 2007)
- Died: John Hughlings Jackson, 76, pioneering British neurologist.

== October 8, 1911 (Sunday) ==
- Spanish troops defeated hostile tribesmen in Morocco but sustained heavy losses. The Moors killed 36 Spaniards and wounded another 109 in a battle at the Kert River.
- After seizing Tripoli from the Ottoman Empire, the Italian occupational government declared that slavery there was outlawed. Reportedly, Tripoli was "the only remaining port on the coast of Africa where slavery still prevailed."

== October 9, 1911 (Monday) ==
- The Treaty of Daan was signed between representatives of the Sultan of the Ottoman Empire and the Imam of Yemen, expanding autonomy in that Ottoman province.
- Born: Joe Rosenthal, American photographer whose picture of the raising of the American flag at Iwo Jima became an iconic image of World War II; in Washington DC (d. 2006).
- Died: Jack Daniel (Jasper Newton Daniel), 65, Tennessee whiskey distiller, from gangrene, six years after breaking his toe while kicking a safe in his office. His name remains famous for Jack Daniel's whiskey, produced in his hometown of Lynchburg, Tennessee.

== October 10, 1911 (Tuesday) ==
- The Wuchang Uprising began when a group of Chinese revolutionaries in the city of Wuchang were working in their hideout, loading rifle shells, when one of them let a cigarette ash fall into gunpowder. The resulting explosion brought an investigation by the police, who discovered lists of the group's members, which included members of the Imperial Army. Faced with certain arrest and probable execution, the rebels began the insurrection ahead of schedule.
- Robert L. Borden was sworn in as the new Prime Minister of Canada, along with the rest of his cabinet, as the last official act of outgoing Governor-General Earl Grey.
- Voters in California approved initiatives, referendums and recall by overwhelming majorities, and women's suffrage by a slight majority. Initiatives were approved 168,744 to 52,093; recall by 178,115 to 53,755. California was the 10th state to enact initiative and referendum — South Dakota had been the first, in 1898.
- Using captured lists of revolutionaries, Hubei Province Governor-General Jui-ch'eng (Rui Cheng) sent military police to arrest and execute three conspirators within the Chinese army. Sergeant Hsing Ping-k'un (Xiong Bingkun) of the 8th Engineering Battalion of the 8th Regiment, though not on the list, was confronted by officers and fired the first shots, persuading his men to mutiny and seizing the Chuwangtai Arsenal. General Li Yuanhong then took charge of the brigade. The Governor-General fled, and the local Manchu commander, Zhang Biao, ordered his troops to retreat, leaving the mutineers in control of a complete arsenal and the provincial treasury, and the revolution spread to other provinces.

== October 11, 1911 (Wednesday) ==
- The Italian expeditionary force, commanded by General Carlo Caneva, arrived at Tripoli.
- Annie Jump Cannon began the Harvard University classification of stars. Within less than four years, she completed the task of compiling the data on 225,300 stars and identifying them under the spectral classes O, B, A, F, G, K and M.
- Died: Miguel Malvar, 46, the last insurgent to surrender in the Philippine–American War. He surrendered in April 1902.

== October 12, 1911 (Thursday) ==
- Two days after revolutionaries captured Wuchang, the Hubei provincial assembly voted to secede from the Chinese Empire and to form a republic, and Colonel Li Yuanhong announced the overthrow of the Qing dynasty. The cities of Hangkow and Hanyang were occupied by the rebels without incident.
- The Society of American Indians held its organizing convention, at a hotel in Columbus, Ohio.
- Et Voila!, the first "cubist musical", premiered in Paris at the Theatre des Capucines, with M. Armand Berthez wearing a special suit of "overlapping polygons".

== October 13, 1911 (Friday) ==
- Prince Arthur, Duke of Connaught and Strathearn, was sworn in as the new Governor General of Canada at the Parliament House in Ottawa, serving until 1916. He was the first royal prince to have been commissioned as a Governor-General of any British dominion. Arthur was the son of Queen Victoria, and the uncle of the reigning British monarch, King George V, in whose name he governed Canada.
- Ford Motor Company, Ltd., opened its first factory in the United Kingdom, at Trafford Park.
- A company of 27 U.S. Marines and 23 U.S. Navy sailors landed at Hankou, after being brought by the gunboat USS Helena, to protect the property and employees of the Standard Oil company.
- Imperial China's Minister of War, Prince Yin-chang, secretly requested the assistance of Japan in putting down the nationalist rebellion.

== October 14, 1911 (Saturday) ==
- Hans Schmidt became the 100th person to lose his life in an airplane crash since the Wright Brothers made the first flight in 1903. Schmidt was stunt-flying in Bern, Switzerland, when the plane's engine exploded at an altitude of 150 feet. Earlier in the day, Rene Level was killed at Rheims. Another four people had been killed on the ground by errant airplane flights.
- Emma Albani, at the time one of the world's most popular opera singers, gave her farewell performance at the Albert Hall in London, singing Paolo Tosti's aria Goodbye.
- A memorable demonstration at Purdue University of modern farm equipment shattered records as spectators watched a set of three tractors plow an acre of land in 4 minutes and 15 seconds. Word of the event prompted a follow-up on October 20, and sales of farm machinery skyrocketed.
- President Taft broke ground for the Panama–Pacific International Exposition in San Francisco.
- The Italian superdreadnought Leonardo da Vinci was launched at Genoa, followed the next day by the battleship Giulio Cesare (named for Julius Caesar).
- The American Society of Safety Engineers was founded as the United Society of Casualty Inspectors.
- Born: Lê Đức Thọ, North Vietnamese chief negotiator in peace talks with the United States; Nobel Prize winner (d. 1990).
- Died: John Marshall Harlan, 78, Associate Justice of the United States Supreme Court, five days after hearing his final case. Harlan's death gave President Taft the fifth vacancy on the nation's highest court in less than three years, giving President Taft the unprecedented opportunity to have appointed a majority of its members.

== October 15, 1911 (Sunday) ==
- Government troops, led by General Figueroa, killed 500 Zapatistas in a battle near the village of Tepoztlán, but Emiliano Zapata escaped.

== October 16, 1911 (Monday) ==
- A railroad watchman discovered 39 sticks of dynamite and a long fuse that had been placed below a railroad viaduct near Gaviota, California, west of Santa Barbara, a few hours before President Taft's train was to pass over it. Abe Jenkins, employed by the Southern Pacific Railroad, chased away two men from beneath the bridge, then searched and found the explosives. Taft's railroad car, on its way from San Francisco to Los Angeles, passed over the bridge as the Santa Barbara County Sheriff's Office stood guard.
- The National Urban League was created by the merger of three African-American service organizations, with George E. Haynes as its first president. It was called the National League on Urban Conditions Among Negroes (NLUCAN) until 1920.
- In the first meeting of the Progressive Republican Party, 200 Republicans, who were dissatisfied with the performance of Republican President Taft, met in Chicago and endorsed U.S. Senator Robert La Follette for President.

== October 17, 1911 (Tuesday) ==
- Two months after the death of his father, 25-year-old Osman Ali Khan ascended the throne of the Nizam of Hyderabad.
- A mob in Hangkow attacked soldiers landed there by German warships.
- Results of the 1911 Census revealed Canada's population to be 7,081,869 (with 70,000 left of four uncounted districts), an increase of more than one-third since the 1901 Census (5,371,315), but a million people less than had been expected.

== October 18, 1911 (Wednesday) ==
- The Return of Peter Grimm, starring David Warfield, was presented for the first time, at the Belasco Theatre on Broadway.
- Born: Victor Perez, French Tunisian Jewish boxer who was the world flyweight champion 1931-32; in Tunis. Perez would die after being sent to the Nazi concentration camp at Auschwitz in 1945.
- Died: Alfred Binet, 54, French psychologist and the inventor of the first reliable intelligence test, now referred to as the Stanford–Binet Intelligence Scales.

== October 19, 1911 (Thursday) ==
- At 9:30 a.m., Roald Amundsen set off for the South Pole along with four other members of the Norwegian Antarctic Expedition (Helmer Hanssen, Sverre Hassel, Olav Bjaaland, Oscar Wisting) and 54 dogs, starting nearly two weeks sooner than the rival British expedition led by Robert Falcon Scott.
- Game Four of the 1911 World Series was rained out, with the Philadelphia Athletics having a 2-game to 1 advantage over the New York Giants. The game was postponed five times before being played on October 24. The delay set a record that would not be broken until 1989 when the World Series—between the Athletics and Giants, who had moved to Oakland and San Francisco respectively—was delayed for twelve days by the 1989 Loma Prieta earthquake.
- Died: Eugene Burton Ely, who had been the first person to take off from a ship in an airplane (on November 14, 1910) and later the first person to land an airplane on a ship (January 18, 1911), was killed while performing stunt flying at the county fair in Macon, Georgia.

== October 20, 1911 (Friday) ==
- Terauchi Masatake, the Japanese Governor-General of Korea, issued the "Regulations for Private Schools."
- Twelve iron miners were killed at Hibernia, New Jersey when blasting at the Wharton Steel Company cracked a retaining wall drowning 12 of 60 miners in a 1,400 foot deep pit.

== October 21, 1911 (Saturday) ==
- Archduke Charles, second in succession to the Austrian-Hungarian throne (after his uncle, Franz Ferdinand), married Zita of Bourbon-Parma at the Castle at Shwarzau, becoming next in line after Franz Ferdinand renounced the throne.
- Twelve-year-old Martha Frazier, who worked as a lion tamer at her family's traveling circus, was fatally injured by a lion before thousands of spectators at a performance in Utica, Mississippi. She died two days later.
- The Imperial government of China contracted to purchase $15,000,000 worth of supplies from the United States Navy in order to fight the revolution there, although the government would fall before the aid could be provided.

== October 22, 1911 (Sunday) ==
- The Chinese National Assembly was opened, as scheduled, for its second session in Beijing, as the revolution continued in Southern China.
- The Greek steamer Georgios wrecked at the entrance of Gironde estuary at Rochefort, France, drowning 15 members of its crew.

== October 23, 1911 (Monday) ==
- Captain Carlo Piazza of the Italian Army became the first person to perform aerial reconnaissance in wartime, taking off from Tripoli at 6:19 a.m., for reconnaissance, then flying to ‘Aziziya to observe the maneuvers of Turkish troops in Libya. He returned at 7:20 a.m. with his report.
- In the Battle of Al-Hani, outside of Tripoli, more than 300 Italian soldiers were killed as the Turkish and Arabian troops retook the city. The Italians, under General Caneva, retaliated with atrocities against the Arab population, killing 4,000 men, women and children over the next three days. The Libyan triumph is commemorated by a monument at the site.
- Winston Churchill and Reginald McKenna traded posts within the British cabinet, with Churchill becoming the First Lord of the Admiralty, and Mr. McKenna Home Secretary.
- Karadorde, the first feature film produced in Yugoslavia, had its première in Belgrade. Directed by Svetozar Botorić, the motion picture about the 1804 uprising led by Karađorđe Petrović against the Turks, was eventually sent to the Austro-Hungarian film archive and then misplaced for 90 years. It would be rediscovered in 2003, and the restored version was a hit for a new generation.
- In an early form of cable entertainment that predated radio, The Telephone Herald, a service inspired by the Hungarian Telefon Hirmondo, made its debut in Newark, New Jersey. For a monthly fee, households subscribing to the service could listen to a schedule of programming over their telephones.
- Died: William Onslow, 4th Earl of Onslow, 58, Deputy Speaker of the British House of Lords and one time Colonial Governor of New Zealand (1889–1892).

== October 24, 1911 (Tuesday) ==
- Going aloft during a 50-mile per hour gale, Orville Wright set a gliding record of 9 minutes and 40 seconds at the Outer Banks, at an altitude of 150 feet. The mark stood until the 1970s, when hang gliding increased time in the air.
- The advance team for Robert Falcon Scott's British Antarctic Expedition — Bernard Day, Tom Lashly, F.J. Hooper and Teddy Evans — set off with food and supplies at 10:30 from Cape Evans. Scott and his party set off on November 1.
- Born:
  - Clarence M. Kelley, FBI Director (1973-1978); in Kansas City, Missouri (d. 1997).
  - Sonny Terry, blind American blues harmonica player; as Saunders Terrell in Greensboro, Georgia (d. 1986).
- Died: Ida Lewis, 69, nationally famous lighthouse keeper who saved 18 people during her lifetime.

== October 25, 1911 (Wednesday) ==
- General Feng Sen, newly appointed as the Military Governor of Canton (now Guangzhou) was assassinated upon his arrival. General Feng and his wife had arrived on a steamboat and were walking across the gangplank, when a bomb was thrown from a rooftop overlooking the wharf.
- Born: Mikhail Yangel, Soviet missile designer (d. 1971).

== October 26, 1911 (Thursday) ==
- The Philadelphia Athletics defeated the New York Giants, 13-2, to win the World Series in 6 games. The game was tied 1-1 after three innings, but with four runs in the fourth, and seven innings in the seventh, the A's demolished the Giants. The most unusual play of the game was an inside-the-park home run made by the A's Jack Barry, on a bunt.
- At Hankou, Li Huan-hung (Li Yuan Hung) proclaimed that he was President of the Republic of China.
- Captain Riccardo Moizo, flying a Nieuport, became the first pilot to have his plane hit in combat, with three bullet holes in the wing while flying over an encampment of 6,000 men.
- The Bolsheokhtinsky Bridge over the Neva River in Saint Petersburg was opened to traffic.
- China's first Civil Code was delivered to the Imperial court.
- The U.S. Department of Justice began antitrust proceedings against United States Steel, in federal court in New Jersey. That court would rule in U.S. Steel's favor on June 3, 1915.
- Born:
  - Mahalia Jackson, American gospel singer; in New Orleans (d. 1972).
  - Sorley MacLean, Scottish poet; on Raasay (d. 1996).
  - Shiing-Shen Chern, Chinese-American mathematician; in Jiaxing (d. 2004).

== October 27, 1911 (Friday) ==
- Yuan Shikai was named Commander in Chief of China's armed forces, and attacked Hankow, while sending his negotiator Liu Ch'eng-en to talk to revolutionary leader Li Yuan-hung (October 29).
- A disgruntled employee of the Selig Studios shot and killed director Francis Boggs, and wounded film mogul William Selig, at the studio headquarters in the Los Angeles suburb of Edendale. Boggs, 41, had persuaded Selig to make the studio the first of many to locate in the Los Angeles area, prior to Hollywood becoming the center of entertainment production.
- The Sichuan Province declared its independence from China.
- Shaker Heights, Ohio was incorporated as Shaker Village as a planned community created by Oris and Mantis Van Sweringen
- Former U.S. President Theodore Roosevelt was outraged after learning that his protege, President Taft, had directed the U.S. Department of Justice filed suit against the United States Steel Company. The antitrust suit alleged, in part, that as President, Roosevelt had been misled into allowing U.S. Steel to acquire Tennessee Coal and Iron in 1907. The timing of the suit, a little more than a year before the presidential election, was later described as "a disastrous political error," leading Roosevelt to run against President Taft.
- Born: Sant Fateh Singh, Sikh religious and political leader (d. 1972).

== October 28, 1911 (Saturday) ==
- At the first legislative session of the Tsu-Cheng Yuan, China's new National Assembly, the delegates demanded three reforms: a cabinet of ministers without Manchu nobility; an amnesty for persons who committed political offenses; and a permanent constitution.
- After 40 years in which there had been only one Roman Catholic Cardinal for the entire United States, Pope Pius X announced the appointment of three more. Archbishop John Murphy Farley of New York, Archbishop William Henry O'Connell of Boston, and Apostolic Delegate Diomede Falconio, who had become a naturalized citizen, joined Archbishop James Gibbons of Baltimore.

== October 29, 1911 (Sunday) ==
- Died: Joseph Pulitzer, 64, American newspaper publisher. His will created the Columbia School of Journalism and the Pulitzer Prize.

== October 30, 1911 (Monday) ==
- In the name of the five-year-old Emperor, Pu Yi, China's Imperial government acknowledged errors and promised quick and complete reforms in two edicts. The National Assembly was authorized to draft a constitution, which it did within four days.
- The First Solvay Conference begins in Brussels, as an invite-only council chaired by Hendrik Lorentz. This was the first international conference in the history of modern science, and would spark the creation of the regular, open Solvay Conferences in 1912.

== October 31, 1911 (Tuesday) ==
- Writing for The New York Evening Mail, sportswriter Grantland Rice gave his column the name "The Sportlight" (suggested by Franklin P. Adams), which it would retain for the rest of Rice's days as he moved to the New-York Tribune and then into national syndication, until his death on July 13, 1954.
- Died: J.J. Montgomery, 55, American aeronautical engineer, died in a plane crash.
