= September 1911 =

Month of 1911

<<	September 1911					>>
Su	Mo	Tu	We	Th	Fr	Sa
					1	2
3	4	5	6	7	8	9
10	11	12	13	14	15	16
17	18	19	20	21	22	23
24	25	26	27	28	29	30

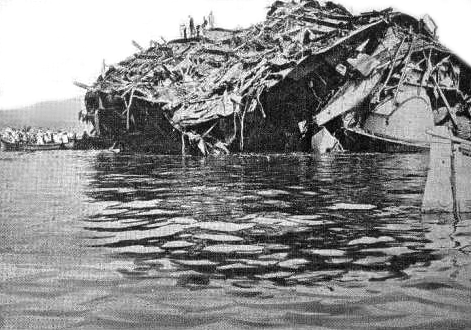
September 25, 1911: 300 killed in explosion of French battleship Liberté

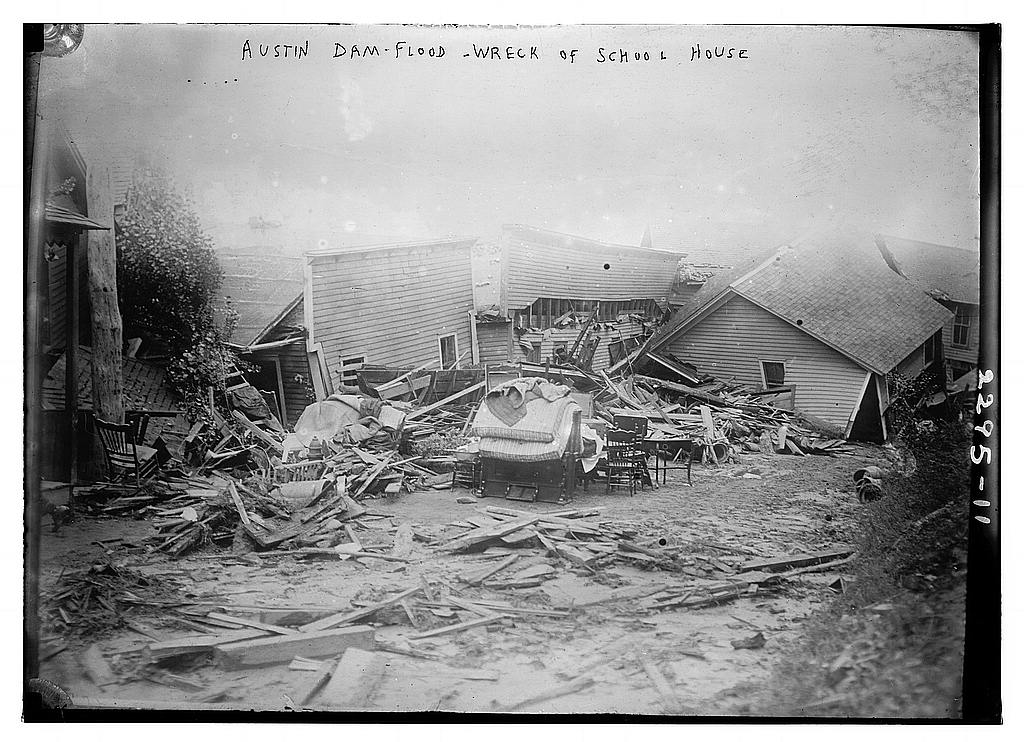
September 30, 1911: 78 killed by damburst at Austin, Pennsylvania

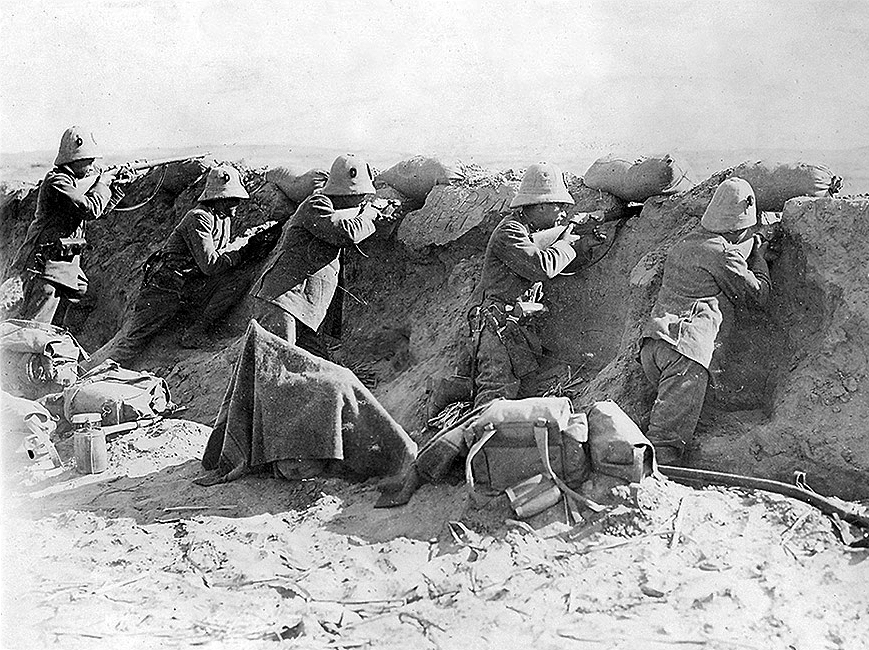
September 29, 1911: Italy goes to war with Turkey, invades Libya

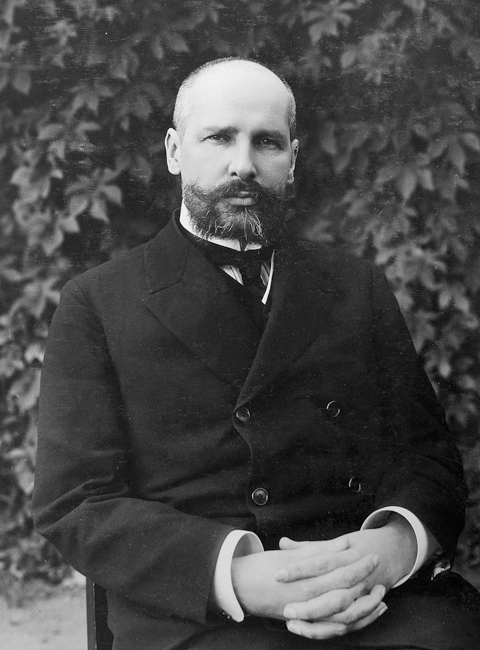
September 14, 1911: Russian Premier Stolypin assassinated

The following events occurred in September 1911:

== September 1, 1911 (Friday) ==
- Dutch aviation pioneer Anton Fokker, whose aircraft factory would produce many of the aircraft used by Germany during World War I, made a successful public demonstration of his very first airplane model, the Fokker Spin. Taking off from a field near his home in the Netherlands city of Haarlem, he took de Spin (Dutch for "the spider"), Fokker demonstrated the Spin's maneuverability by flying a circle around the town's tallest structure, the steeple of the Sint Bavokerk, the Church of Saint Bavo of Ghent.
- Emilio Estrada was inaugurated as the 23rd President of Ecuador. He would die less than four months into his term.
- Died: Bradford Lee Gilbert, 58, architect who designed the 13-story tall Tower Building, New York's first skyscraper.

== September 2, 1911 (Saturday) ==
- The Russian icebreaker ships Taymyr and Vaygach landed at Wrangel Island as part of the coast of Antarctica, and claimed it for the Russian Empire.
- João Pinheiro Chagas became the new Prime Minister of Portugal.
- A statue of Baron von Steuben, Prussian leader during the American Revolutionary War, was presented by U.S. Congressman Richard Bartholdt from the United States to Germany, and was unveiled at Potsdam by Kaiser Wilhelm II.
- Self-taught aviation pioneer Albin K. Longren of Kansas flew the first successful trial of his handmade aircraft.
- Born:
  - William F. Harrah, founder of Harrah's casino empire; in South Pasadena, California (d. 1978).
  - Romare Bearden, African-American painter; in Charlotte, North Carolina (d. 1988).

== September 3, 1911 (Sunday) ==
- As the Agadir Crisis continued, the Kaiser and the Chancellor departed for Kiel for a display of German naval might, a crowd of 200,000 turned out for an anti-war rally at Treptower Park in Berlin. Speakers from the Social Democrats, included August Bebel and Karl Liebknecht, who criticized Germany's aggressive moves in Morocco.

== September 4, 1911 (Monday) ==
- A professional wrestling match at Chicago's Comiskey Park attracted a sellout crowd of 30,000 people, pitting world champion Frank Gotch against George Hackenschmidt, from whom Gotch had won the title on April 3, 1908. The original bout had taken 2 hours. In the rematch, Gotch kept his title, defeating Hackenschmidt in 30 minutes.
- Harriet Quimby won her first air race, receiving $1,500 at the Richmond County Fair on New York's Staten Island.
- Delray Beach, Florida, population 250, became a city after its charter was approved by the 56 voters participating. A century later, the city population had grown to 65,000.
- France's most powerful naval fleet ever, with 50 warships, was reviewed by President Armand Fallières at Toulon. Théophile Delcassé, the French Minister of the Navy, declared in a speech that "Their powder magazines are full, and all of them could be mobilized immediately."
- Roland G. Garros broke the altitude record, flying to 4,250 meters (13,943 feet) at Parame, France.

== September 5, 1911 (Tuesday) ==
- Reports of the flood that would drown 200,000 people were relayed to the world by Western missionaries, after China's Yangtze River overflowed its banks. The American Mission at Wuhu initially reported that 100,000 people had drowned in the Ngan-hwei (now Anhui province) and that 95% of crops along the banks had been destroyed. Follow-up reports were that the destruction extended from I-Chang (Yichang) in the Hu-peh (Hubei) province and down to Shanghai for 700 miles. Estimates of the number of people who died have been as high as 200,000 who drowned and another 100,000 who starved or were murdered during the subsequent famine.
- The day after France showed off its 50 warships, Kaiser Wilhelm II reviewed a fleet of 99 warships of the German Navy at Kiel. The procession, which did not include three of the four Helgoland-class battleships, was seen by American observers as proof that Germany had displaced the United States as having the second most powerful navy in the world (after the British Navy).
- At the Battle of Imamzadeh Ja'far, Persian troops successfully routed rebels seeking to restore the deposed Shah, Mohammed Ali Mirza, to the throne. The outcome was reported later to have been as a result of superior weapons, with the government forces using machine guns under the direction of German adviser Major Haas. Rebel leader Arshad ed Dowleh was captured, and executed the next day. Seized with him was a large amount of gold used by the ex-Shah, who fled with his remaining 7 followers to Gumesh Tepe at the border.
- The first adult literacy program in the United States, when Cora Wilson Stewart, the school superintendent in Rowan County, Kentucky, began a program that she called the Moonlight School. The night classes at the county's 50 schools would take place as long as the Moon was bright enough for students to safely travel. She had expected that 150 adults might want to learn to read. Instead, 1,200 men and women signed up.

== September 6, 1911 (Wednesday) ==
- Thomas W. Burgess became only the second person to swim across the English Channel, and the first in 36 years, after Matthew Webb had crossed on August 25, 1875. Burgess, who had failed in 15 prior attempts, arrived at Cape Grisnez on the French coast at 9:50 a.m., 22 hours and 35 minutes after setting off from South Foreland the day before.
- Recently released from prison and exiled to Vologda, Joseph Stalin (at the time Josif Dzhugashvili) made an illegal trip to Saint Petersburg to link up with the Bolshevik organization. Stalin boarded a train with the identity papers of Pyotr Chizhikov, but the Okhrana police, arrested Chizhikov and alerted the Russian capital that Stalin was on the way. Stalin was captured three days later.
- Born: Harry Danning, Jewish MLB player nicknamed "Harry the Horse"; in Los Angeles (d. 2004).
- Died:
  - Katherine Cecil Thurston, 37, Irish American novelist famous for The Masquerader, died of a seizure.
  - Armand Cochefort, 61, French chief of detectives during the Dreyfus Affair.

== September 7, 1911 (Thursday) ==
- French poet Guillaume Apollinaire was arrested in Paris and charged with the theft of the Mona Lisa, but released after a week. Pablo Picasso was brought in for questioning by the police, but not detained.
- The first U.S. Navy aviation unit was organized, with Lt. Theodore Gordon Ellyson as its commanding officer.
- Portugal assembled 12,000 troops at its northern border to fend off a monarchist invasion. Airplane reconnaissance estimated that 5,000 rebels were concentrated at Ourense.
- Born: Todor Zhivkov, First Secretary of Bulgarian Communist Party (1954–1989) and President (1971–1989); in Pravets (d. 1998).
- Died: Professor Masuchika Shimose, 52, Japanese chemist who invented "Shimose powder", a powerful explosive successfully used in shells and torpedoes by the Imperial Japanese Navy.

== September 8, 1911 (Friday) ==
- A day after the temperature at his Antarctic camp at Framheim rose to -7.6 °F, Norwegian explorer Roald Amundsen, seven men and 86 dogs began the journey toward the South Pole. Four days later, the temperature dropped to -68 °F, forcing Amundsen's return.
- General John J. Pershing, serving in the Philippines as U.S. Military Governor of the Moro Province issued Executive Order No. 24 to disarm the Moro residents. The rule made it unlawful for anyone in the province "to acquire, possess, or have the custody of any rifle, musket, carbine, shotgun, revolve, pistol or other deadly weapon from which a bullet, ball, shot, shell or other missile or missiles may be discharged by means of gunpowder or other explosive" and prohibited people from carrying "any bowie knife, dirk, dagger, kris, campilan, spear, or other deadly cutting or thrusting weapon, except tools used exclusively for working purposes having blades less than 15 inches in length."
- The collapse of the El Dorado Theatre at Nice killed 11 construction workers.
- Lt. Col. Henry Galway was appointed as the British colonial Governor of The Gambia.

== September 9, 1911 (Saturday) ==
- The first test of air mail service in Britain was done by an airplane flight between Hendon Aerodrome and Windsor.
- Governor Judson Harmon of Ohio opposed President William Howard Taft at a campaign speech in Boston, and did not rule out a run for the Democratic nomination in 1912, with New Jersey Governor Woodrow Wilson as his running mate.
- Fourteen people were killed in a motorboat accident on Lake Trasimene in Italy.
- Born:
  - Sir John Gorton, Prime Minister of Australia from 1968 to 1971; in Melbourne (d. 2002).
  - Paul Goodman, American social critic; in New York City (d. 1972).

== September 10, 1911 (Sunday) ==
- The Lakeview Gusher, which had erupted in California on March 14, 1910, ceased as suddenly as it started, as oil stopped flowing from it in the early morning hours.
- `Abdu'l-Bahá, leader of the Baháʼí Faith since 1892, gave his first lecture in the West, speaking at the City Temple in London at the request of the pastor, the Reverend John Campbell.
- Died:
  - Ed Butler, 73, St. Louis political boss and owner of a chain of blacksmith shops.
  - Samantha Breniholz, chief telegrapher for Union Army at Battle of Gettysburg.

== September 11, 1911 (Monday) ==
- California State University, Fresno, popularly known as Fresno State, began classes as the Fresno State Normal School.
- The Pittsburgh Pirates, on the way from St. Louis to Cincinnati, stopped in West Baden, Indiana, and played an exhibition game against a local African-American team, the West Baden Sprudels. The all-white Pirates, third place in the National League at the time with a record of 76-56, lost to the all-black Sprudels, 2-1.
- The Bird of Paradise, a musical credited with introducing Hawaiian music to the mainland United States, was first performed.
- With 900,000 men on the battlefield, the German Army began the largest maneuvers in history, drilling at Prenzlau at Pomerania. Exceeding any war games that had ever been done, the demonstration of German military might concluded on September 13.
- The eruption of Mount Etna in Italy sent a lava stream 2000 feet wide and four feet deep, and leaving 20,000 homeless, between Linguaglossa and Randazzo.
- After a ten-day voyage from England, the Hai Chi became the first Chinese warship to visit the United States, sailing into the port of New York City. The ship, with Rear Admiral Chin Pih Kwang on board, and anchored in the Hudson River.
- Born: Lala Amarnath, first captain of Indian National cricket team after India's independence from the United Kingdom (d. 2000).

== September 12, 1911 (Tuesday) ==
- The Viceroy of Sichuan was ordered to suppress labor unrest there and "to destroy the rebels to the last man."
- Japan abandoned its naval station at Port Arthur naval base, Manchuria.
- Died: The Most Rev. William Alexander, 87, Anglican Primate of All Ireland and Archbishop of Armagh since 1896.

== September 13, 1911 (Wednesday) ==
- In Imperial China, a new constitution with 19 articles was promulgated, providing for some democratic reforms, as well as the legal authority for emergency power to issue orders. The document was only in use for a month before the Qing dynasty failed and the Republic of China was declared.
- The "Third Attack Group", the first close air support unit for the United States Army, was established with four attack squadrons of flyers.
- Born: Bill Monroe, American musician nicknamed the "Father of Bluegrass Music;" in Rosine, Kentucky (d. 1996).

== September 14, 1911 (Thursday) ==
- Pyotr Stolypin, the Prime Minister of Russia was assassinated. Stolypin was shot in the stomach by Dmitry Bogrov while attending The Tale of Tsar Saltan at the opera house in Kiev, and died of his wounds four days later.
- El Primer Congreso Mexicanista, with 400 Mexican American residents of Texas in attendance, was convened at Laredo under the leadership of Nicasio Idar to advocate civil rights for Hispanic citizens. The convention approved the formation of La Gran Liga de Beneficincia y Proteccion (The Grand League for Benefits and Protection).

== September 15, 1911 (Friday) ==
- In the largest bank robbery at the time, three safecrackers broke into a branch of the Bank of Montreal in New Westminster, British Columbia, and stole $251,161 in Canadian currency and $20,560 worth of American double eagle gold coins, with a worth in U.S. dollars of $320,000. A janitor who had happened by at 4:00 a.m. was tied up by the robbers, and the bank's caretaker did not discover the theft until two hours later. The culprits left behind another $100,000 worth of small bills and silver and escaped without notice, despite the bank being located only 25 yards away from the city police station. "Australian Jack" McNamara and Charles Dean were both tried for the theft, and both acquitted, although McNamara was convicted of stealing an automobile believed to have been used as a getaway car. Bills from the robbery continued to be spotted a decade after the robbery.;
- U.S. President Taft finished the vacation at Beverly, Massachusetts, that had begun on August 11. Rather than returning to the White House, he began a 15,000 mile tour of 30 of the nation's 46 states. After spending three months away from Washington, D.C., Taft returned to the White House on November 12.
- Born:
  - Joseph Pevney, American television and film director; in New York City (d. 2008).
  - Luther L. Terry, U.S. Surgeon General (1961–1965), whose 1964 report on cigarette smoking was the first American acknowledgment of the link between tobacco and lung cancer; in Red Level, Alabama (d. 1985).
- Died: Iwisaki Kimi, 9, subject of the Japanese children's song "The Girl in Red Shoes". Adopted by American missionary Charles Huit at the age of 3, she was abandoned to a church orphanage in Azabu-Juban after the Huits returned to the U.S., due to her having tuberculosis. Statues of Kimi were erected in several sites in Japan after her story was retold in 1973, including one at Azabu-Juban.

== September 16, 1911 (Saturday) ==
- Ten auto race fans were killed, and 13 others seriously injured in Syracuse, New York, when a car driven by Lee Oldfield, brother of Barney Oldfield, blew a tire, lost control, and crashed through a fence at the New York State Fair. President Taft had left the fair only a few minutes earlier.
- Born: Wilfred Burchett, leftist Australian journalist; in Clifton Hill, Victoria (d. 1983).
- Died:
  - Edward Whymper, 71, English mountaineer who became, on July 14, 1865, the first man to climb the Matterhorn.
  - Édouard de Nieuport, 36, French aircraft pilot and designer; in a plane crash.

== September 17, 1911 (Sunday) ==
- Calbraith Perry Rodgers took off from the airstrip at Sheepshead Bay near New York City with the goal of winning the $50,000 Hearst Transcontinental Prize for the first person to fly across the United States in an airplane within 30 days and before October 10, 1911. Sponsored by the Armour Company and flying the Vin Fiz, Rodgers made 69 landings, including 19 crashes. When the deadline for the prize expired on October 10, he had only reached Marshall, Missouri, but he continued until landing in Pasadena on November 5, 1911, having covered 4,231 miles in 49 days.

== September 18, 1911 (Monday) ==
- Osman Ali Khan was formally enthroned as the new Nizam of Hyderabad in an elaborate durbar attended by the nobility across his Indian princely state.
- The value of reconnaissance by airplane was first demonstrated to the French Army, as Captain Eteve and Captain Pichot-Duclas flew from Verdun to Etraye and Romagne and provided in-depth information of their observations.
- Died: Pyotr Stolypin, 49, Prime Minister of Russia, four days after being shot by assassins.

== September 19, 1911 (Tuesday) ==
- Labor unions across Spain called for a walkout, and martial law was proclaimed.
- Born: William Golding, British novelist most famous for Lord of the Flies and winner of 1983 Nobel Prize in Literature; in Newquay, Cornwall, England. (d. 1993).

== September 20, 1911 (Wednesday) ==
- The massive White Star ocean liner RMS Olympic collided with the British cruiser HMS Hawke at the Solent, the narrow strait near Southampton, and was badly damaged. The captain of the Olympic was Edward J. Smith, who would later be assigned to the White Star liner RMS Titanic, died after the Titanic hit an iceberg and sank during its maiden voyage on April 15, 1912. The White Star Line was successfully sued for damages to the Hawke after investigators determined that the Olympic had failed to yield the right of way to the smaller ship. In repairing the Olympic, the White Star Line delayed the completion and scheduled March 20, 1912, maiden voyage of the Titanic by 20 days. One historian speculated later that, "If the Hawke and the Olympic had never met, neither would the iceberg and the Titanic."
- Born:
  - Shriram Sharma, Indian religious leader; in Agra (d. 1990).
  - Frank De Vol, American composer for film and television; in Moundsville, West Virginia (d. 1999).
- Died: Anna Parnell, 59, Irish political journalist, drowned while swimming at the English seaside resort of Ilfracombe.

== September 21, 1911 (Thursday) ==
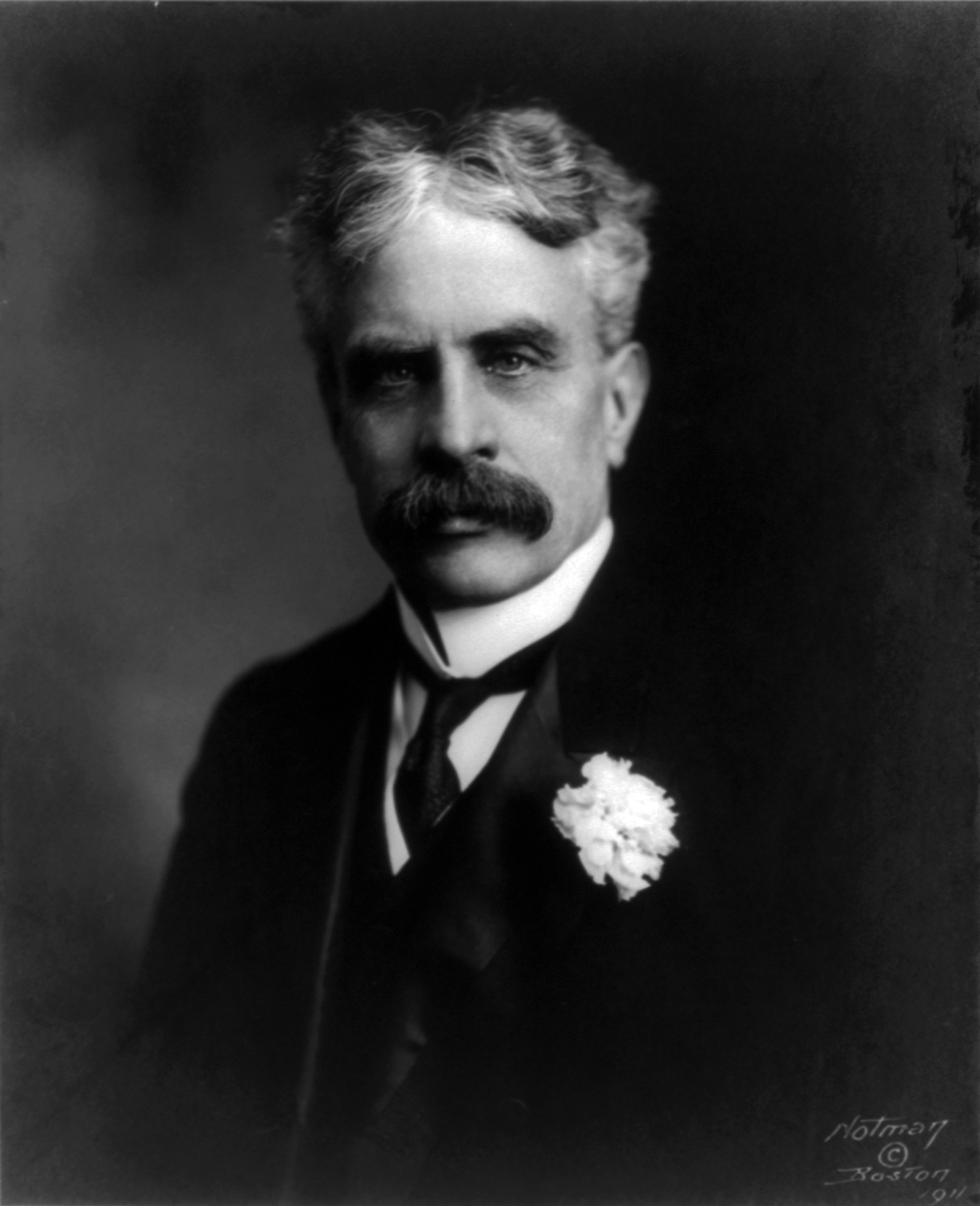
New Canadian Premier Borden

- In elections in Canada, Prime Minister Wilfrid Laurier was swept out of office and his Liberal Party lost its 133-85 majority in the 221 seat House of Commons. The Conservative Party, led by Robert Borden, picked up 47 seats for a 132-85 advantage, as voters made it clear that they did not support the proposal for full trade reciprocity with the United States.
- Chinese troops relieved the besieged city of Chengdu and found that no foreigners had been harmed.
- Died: Ahmed Arabi Pasha, 70, exiled Egyptian rebel leader of the 1881 rebellion against British rule.

== September 22, 1911 (Friday) ==
- Cy Young pitched his 511th and final win, leading the Boston Rustlers (who would be renamed the Boston Braves in 1912) to a 1-0 while visiting the Pittsburgh Pirates. The 511 wins is a record that remains unapproached a century later. Walter Johnson is second with 417 career wins, and the career record for a pitcher active in 2011 was around 200 for Tim Wakefield. Young pitched two more games in 1911, finishing with 313 losses, also a record.

== September 23, 1911 (Saturday) ==
- In the first major demonstration by Protestant Irishmen against "Home Rule" and the separation of all of Ireland from the United Kingdom, Edward Carson led the march of 50,000 Unionists in Northern Ireland from Belfast to Craigavon, the home of James Craig, 1st Viscount Craigavon, and addressed the crowd, declaring, "We must be prepared.. the morning Home Rule passes, ourselves to become responsible for the government of the Protestant Province of Ulster."
- Vladimir Kokovtsov, Finance Minister, became the new Prime Minister of Russia
- The Argentine battleship ARA Moreno, joining the Rivadavia as larger than any other warship in the world, was launched from a shipyard in Camden, New Jersey.
- Jack Donaldson of Australia, nicknamed "The Blue Streak," ran 130 yards in 12 seconds in a foot race against American challenger C.E. "Bullet" Holway, setting a new world record.
- Pilot Earle Ovington made the first official airmail flight in American under the authority of the United States Post Office Department.
- Died: Charles Battell Loomis, 50, American humorist, died of stomach cancer

== September 24, 1911 (Sunday) ==
- Thirteen people were killed, and eight seriously injured, when a train struck a group of people on a hayride at Neenah, Wisconsin. The group had been returning to Menasha from a late night wedding anniversary celebration in a fog, when it was struck by the No. 121 train of the Chicago & Northwestern Railroad. The crossing, whose view was blocked by a billboard, had been the scene of several other fatal accidents in the previous eight years.
- As war between Italy and the Ottoman Empire appeared imminent, Conrad von Hötzendorf, Chief of the Austro-Hungarian Army's General Staff, sent a proposal to the Austro-Hungarian Foreign Minister Count Alois Lexa von Aehrenthal, proposing that Austria attack Italy or conquer the Balkan territories.

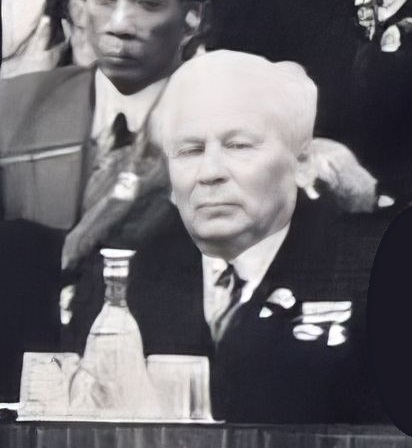
Konstantin Chernenko

- Born:
  - Konstantin Chernenko, General Secretary of the Communist Party of the Soviet Union and head of state (as Chairman of the Presidium of the Supreme Soviet) from 1984 until his death in 1985; in Bolshaya Tes, Russian Empire.
  - Ed Kretz, American motorcycle racer; in San Diego (d. 1996).

== September 25, 1911 (Monday) ==
- The French battleship Liberté exploded at anchor in Toulon, France, killing 235 on the ship and another 65 on other ships, in the worst disaster to have hit the French Navy. At 4:00 in the morning, a fire broke out on the ship, and at 5:35 it reached magazines of gunpowder. The largest blast happened at 5:53.
- The Houston Press published its first issue as a daily newspaper in Houston, Texas. It would later be acquired by the Scripps-Howard, but would cease publication on March 20, 1964, shortly after observing its 50th anniversary.
- Born:
  - Eric Williams, first Prime Minister of Trinidad and Tobago, from 1962 until his death; in Port of Spain (d. 1981).
  - Lilian Ngoyi, South African anti-apartheid activist; in Pretoria, South Africa (d. 1980).
- Died: Dmitri Bogrov, 24, who had fatally wounded Premier Stolypin on September 14, was hanged.

== September 26, 1911 (Tuesday) ==
- The government of Italy prepared an ultimatum and threat of war to Turkey, demanding cession of the Ottoman Empire's North African territory in modern-day Libya, on grounds that Muslim fanatics in Tripoli were endangering Italian lives. Because Germany had been attempting to mediate the crisis between the two kingdoms, delivery of the ultimatum was held off for two days.

== September 27, 1911 (Wednesday) ==
- In the first parliamentary elections in Sweden since the introduction of universal male suffrage, the Liberal Party, led by Karl Staaff, won 102 of the 230 seats in the Riksdag, bringing an end to the Conservative government of Prime Minister Arvid Lindman.
- Born: John Harvey, British character actor; in London (d. 1982).

== September 28, 1911 (Thursday) ==
- The Italo-Turkish War commenced as Italy's ultimatum served upon Turkish Grand Vizier Ibrahim Hakki Pasha at noon by Giacomo De Martino, the Italian Chargé d'affaires at Constantinople after negotiations by Baron Marschall von Bieberstein, the German Ambassador, had failed, giving Turkey 24 hours to give up Libya or to go to war.
- Five days after the appeal in Belfast by Edward Carson, "Ulster Day" was set aside for residents of the Irish province to sign a covenant to resist rule from Dublin in the event that Ireland was granted Home Rule. The pledge was signed by 237,368 men and 234,046 women.

== September 29, 1911 (Friday) ==
- After its ultimatum to Turkey expired at noon, the Italian destroyer Garibaldino sailed into the harbor at Tripoli, and an officer from the ship approached the commander of the Turkish Army to formally demand the city's surrender, which was refused. At 2:30 pm, Italy declared war on Ottoman Empire after Turkey declined to surrender Tripoli. Having failed to prepare Turkey for war, Grand Vizier Hakkı Pasha resigned and was succeeded by Mehmed Said Pasha. The landing of Italian troops took place simultaneously at Tripoli, Benghazi, Derna and Tobruk, "accompanied by the first air raids in history, with the pilots of early biplanes flying low over their targets and lobbing small bombs out by hand." Within a year, Libya would become a protectorate of Italy.
- Died: Henry Northcote, 1st Baron Northcote, 65, who served from 1904 to 1908 as the Governor-General of Australia.

== September 30, 1911 (Saturday) ==
- A concrete dam, maintained by the Bayless Pulp and Paper Mill, burst at 2:30 in the afternoon, sending 4,500,000 gallons of water through the town of Austin, Pennsylvania, and the smaller localities of Costello and Wharton. Officially, 78 people were killed, although the initial estimate of death was almost 1,000.`
- The U.S. Army became the first army in the world to make vaccinations against typhoid mandatory. Within 9 months, the whole army had been immunized against typhoid.
- The Danish cargo ship SS Swarland disappeared along with its crew of 15 men as it was approaching Rotterdam in the Netherlands on its voyage from the German port of Rostock. After it was sighted near its destination, the steamship was not seen again and had apparently sunk.
- Born: Ruth Gruber, American humanitarian, in New York City (d. 2016).
- Died: Wilhelm Dilthey, 77, German philosopher.
