= Myrtle Reed =

American novelist and poet

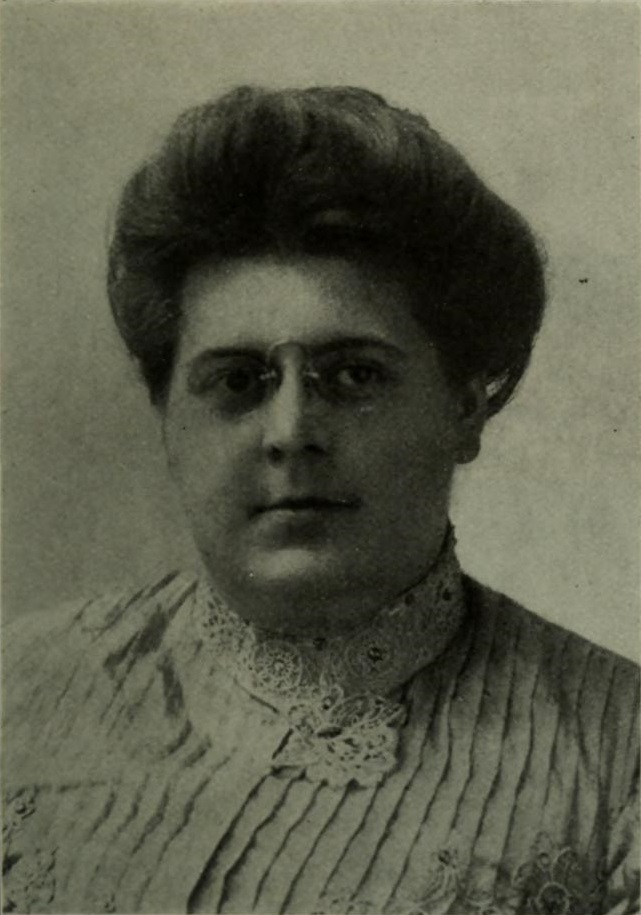
- Born: September 27, 1874; Illinois
- Died: August 17, 1911 (aged 36); Chicago, Illinois
- Occupations: Author; poet; journalist; philanthropist
- Spouse: James Sydney McCullough
- Relatives: Elizabeth Armstrong Reed (mother); Clare Osborne Reed (sister-in-law)
- Writing career
- Pen name: Olive Green, Katherine La Farge Norton
- Notable works: Lavender and Old Lace, Threads of Gray and Gold, A Weaver of Dreams

Myrtle Reed (September 27, 1874 – August 17, 1911) was an American author, poet, journalist, and philanthropist. She wrote a number of bestsellers and published a series of cookbooks under the pseudonym Olive Green.

== Biography ==
She was born on September 27, 1874, in Norwood Park, Chicago, Illinois, the youngest of her parents' three children and their only daughter. She was the daughter of author Elizabeth Armstrong Reed and the preacher Hiram V. Reed. She graduated from the West Division High School, Chicago, where she edited the school's newspaper called The Voice, during which time she corresponded with James Sydney McCullough, a young Irish-Canadian who was editing a college newspaper in Toronto.

She married McCullough in 1906, after a courtship of nearly 15 years. She was a diagnosed insomniac with prescribed sleeping drafts. She died on August 17, 1911, aged 36, of an overdose of sleeping powder taken with suicidal intent in her flat, called "Paradise Flat" at 5120 Kenmore Avenue, Chicago, Illinois. Her suicide letter, written to her maid, Annie Larsen, was published the following day. Her will directed her estate be divided among eight charities that for several years had been favorites of their benefactor; however, her estate was subjected to at least two different lawsuits. Paradise Flat, the residence in which she died, was burgled during her funeral; among the stolen items were several de luxe or signed, slipcased, limited-edition novels written by the decedent. A famous epigram of Myrtle Reed, taken from Threads of Gray and Gold, declares: "The only way to test a man is to marry him. If you live, it's a mushroom. If you die, it's a toadstool."

Designer Margaret Armstrong's series of designs for Reed's works is considered one of Armstrong's greatest and most remembered design series.

Composer Lola Carrier Worrell based one of her songs,"Waiting: Love Lyrics #1," on words by Reed.

== Selected works ==
=== Novels ===
- Love Letters of a Musician (1899)
- Later Love Letters of a Musician (1900)
- The Spinster Book (1901)
- Lavender and Old Lace (1902; new edition, 1907), a long-running play adapted by the American playwright David G. Fischer
- The Shadow of Victory (1903)
- Pickaback Songs (1903)
- The Book of Clever Beasts (1904), received a warm letter of appreciation from then President Theodore Roosevelt
- The Master's Violin (1904)
- At the Sign of the Jack o' Lantern (1905), made into a silent film directed by Lloyd Ingraham in 1922
- A Spinner in the Sun (1906, new edition, 1909)
- Love Affairs of Literary Men (1907; non-fiction; biographical)
- Flower of the Dusk (1908), made into a silent film directed by John Hancock Collins in 1918
- Old Rose and Silver (1909)
- Master of the Vineyard (1910; new edition, 1911)
- Sonnets to a Lover (1910)
- A Weaver of Dreams (1911), made into a silent film starring Viola Dana in 1918
- Threads of Gray and Gold (1913)

=== Nonfiction ===
She also published a series of cookbooks under the pseudonym of Olive Green:

- What to Have for Breakfast (1905)
- Everyday Luncheons (1906)
- One Thousand Simple Soups (1907)
- How to Cook Fish (1908)
- How to Cook Meat and Poultry (1908)
- One Thousand Salads (1909)

The following works were published posthumously:

- Everyday Desserts (1911)
- Myrtle Reed Cookbook (1916)
- Myrtle Reed Yearbook (1911)
- A Weaver of Dreams (1911)
- Threads of Grey and Gold (1913)
- The White Shield, a collection of short sketches by Myrtle Reed (1912)
- Happy Women (1913)

=== Autobiography ===
- Myrtle Reed Yearbook (1911), containing biographical foreword

=== Works about Reed ===
- Ethel S. Colson, Myrtle Reed As Her Friends Knew Her (1911)
- To You, a collection of songs by J. C. Rodenbeck (1919)
- Papers, 1856–1922 by Chicago Bishop Samuel Fallows (1919), containing correspondence with Myrtle Reed

== See also ==
- At the Sign of the Jack O'Lantern (1922 silent film)
- A Weaver of Dreams (1918 silent film)
