= William S. Hutchings =

American math prodigy and human calculator

William Street Hutchings
- Born: January 7, 1832; Manhattan, New York, US
- Died: August 25, 1911 (aged 79); Boston, Massachusetts, US
- Other names: Professor Hutchings; Lightning Calculator; William Street Hutchins
- Occupation: Sideshow performer
- Known for: Math prodigy

William Street Hutchings (January 7, 1832 – August 25, 1911), also known as Professor Hutchings and the Lightning Calculator, was a 19th-century math prodigy and mental calculator who P. T. Barnum first billed as the "Boy Lightning Calculator". He later worked as a sideshow barker and wrote a book called The Lightning Calculator.

== Early years ==
William Street Hutchings was born on January 7, 1832, to John Hutchings, a merchant from Long Island, New York and his wife Jane Street. He was born in Manhattan near the corner of Hester Street and Eldridge Street. He attended Hubbs and Clark Academy, and showed skill in mathematics. He worked for a number of years as an accountant for his father.

== Career ==
By 1860, Hutchings was working at Barnum's American Museum. He worked there until it burned down the second time in 1868. In 1872, he performed at the White House for President Ulysses S. Grant.

In 1883, he began performing at Austin and Stone's Dime Museum. He continued to perform there until the time of his death. He claimed to have given 30,000 lectures to 80,000,000 people during the course of his career. He was buried in Mount Hope Cemetery in Boston, Massachusetts.
