= Twin Beds =

Twin Beds may refer to:

- Twin Beds (novel), a 1913 novel by Edward Salisbury Field
- Twin Beds (1914 play), based on the novel
- Twin Beds (1920 film), based on the novel
- Twin Beds (1929 film), based on the novel
- Twin Beds (1942 film), based on the novel
- Twin Beds (How I Met Your Mother), a 2010 How I Met Your Mother episode
