= Fincher (surname) =

David Fincher (born 1962) is an American film director and producer.

Other people with the surname include:

- Alfred Fincher (born 1983), American football linebacker
- Bill Fincher (1896–1978), American college football player
- Bob Fincher (born 1949), American politician from Alabama
- Charlie Fincher (1892–1915), Australian rules footballer for South Melbourne and soldier
- Dan H. Fincher (born 1931), American politician from Georgia
- Dick Fincher (1927–2002), American politician from Florida
- Jack Fincher (footballer) (1904–1970), Australian footballer
- Jack Fincher (screenwriter) (1930–2003), American screenwriter; father of David
- Kye Fincher (born 2007), Australian rules footballer playing for St Kilda; grandson of Noel
- Noel Fincher (1944–2016), Australian rules footballer for Footscray and North Melbourne; grandfather of Kye
- Stephen Fincher (born 1973), American politician from Tennessee
- W. W. Fincher Jr. (1914–2006), American politician from Georgia
