= Thomas Mill and Miller's House =

Historic house and gristmill in Pennsylvania, U.S.

- U.S. National Register of Historic Places
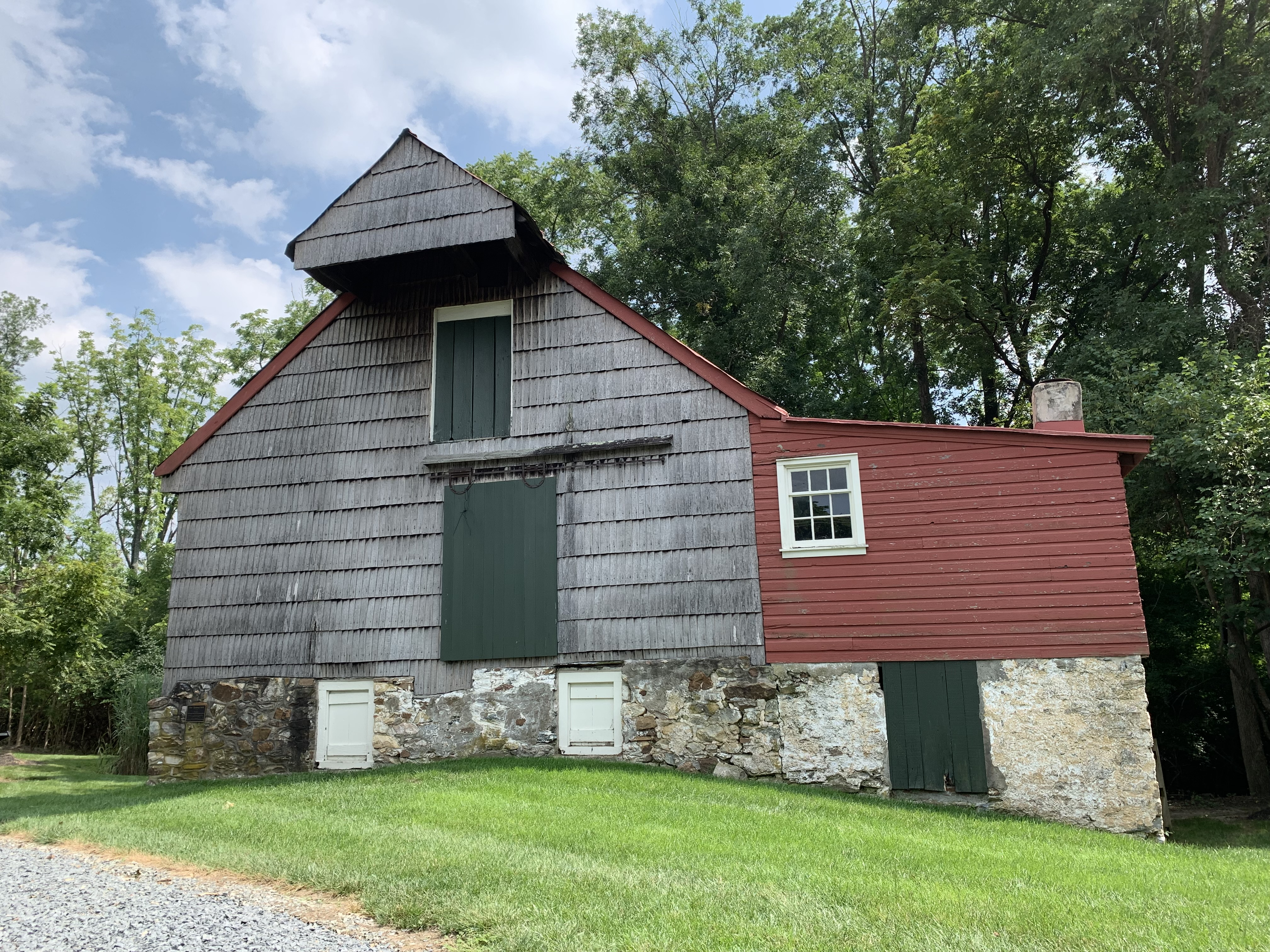
- The Thomas Mill in 2023

- Location within Pennsylvania Location within the United States
- Location: 130 West Lincoln Hwy. Exton, Pennsylvania
- Coordinates: 40°01′12″N 75°38′19″W
- Built: 1744–1754
- Architect: Richard Thomas II
- Architectural style: Colonial/Federal
- NRHP reference No.: 04000468
- Added to NRHP: May 19, 2004

Thomas Mill and Miller's House is a historic grist mill and adjacent dwelling in West Whiteland Township, Chester County, Pennsylvania. Erected between 1744 and 1754, the buildings are made of frame and stone and formed part of the extensive Thomas family holdings in the area. The site was listed on the National Register of Historic Places on May 19, 2004.

== Description and history ==
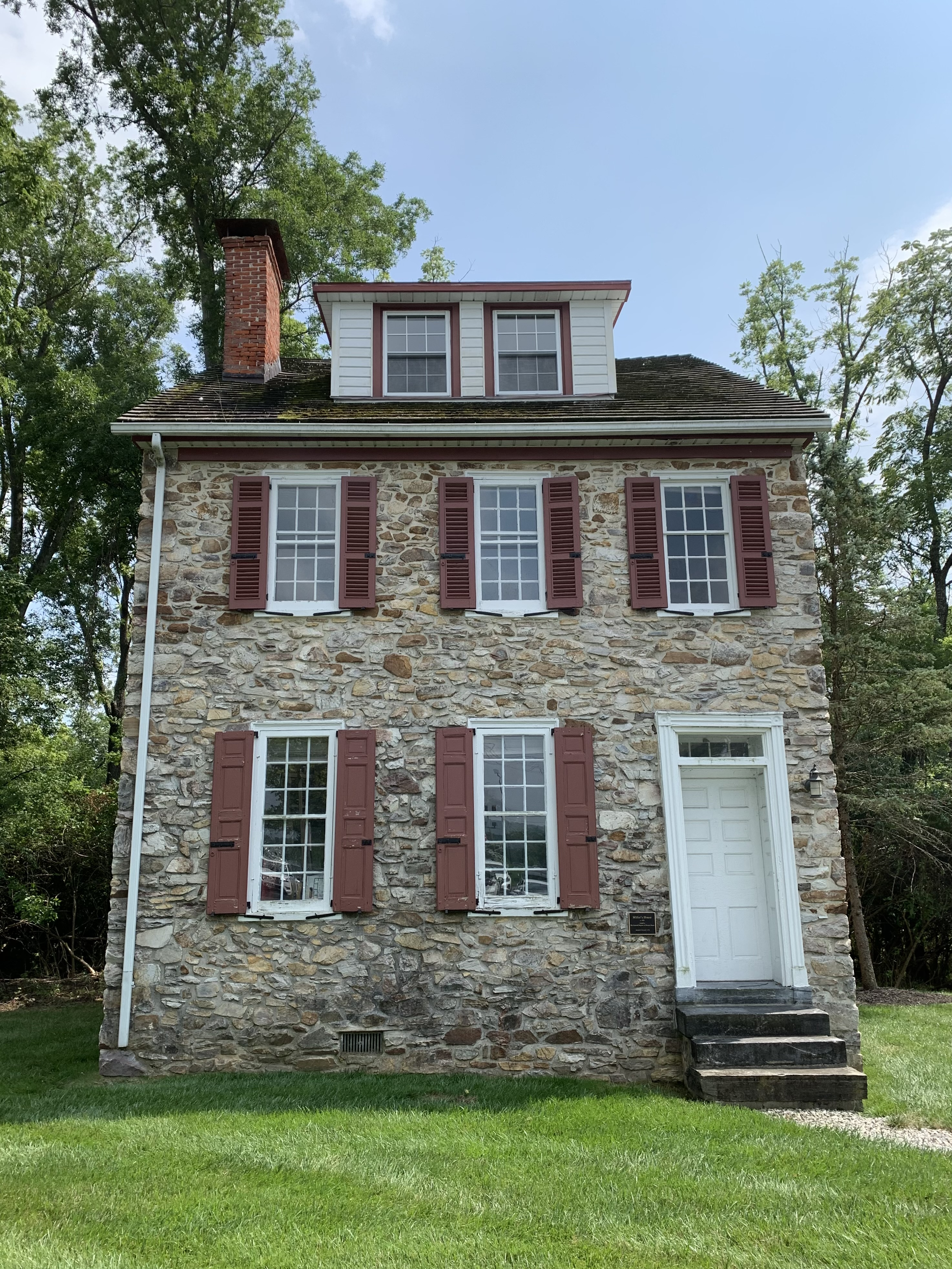
The Miller's House in 2023

Thomas Mill and Miller's House is part of a thematic group of National Register-listed properties affiliated with the Thomas family, including Whitford Hall, Whitford Lodge, and Ivy Cottage. The mill was built in 1744 under the supervision of Richard Thomas II (1713–1754), grandson of one of the original Quaker colonists to whom William Penn deeded land in Pennsylvania. Richard's father, Richard Thomas I (1672–1744), probably created the plans for the mill, whose features such as an interrupted sill and double studs laid flat had been obsolete in English architecture since 1700. The post-in-ground gristmill features massive upright posts to support the upper floors, while sills connect the bays. The mill is the sole surviving example of this vernacular construction style in the mid-Atlantic region. The building rests on a fieldstone foundation (mostly limestone), while the upper story is built using timber framing. Exterior siding is riven shingle over clapboard.

The gristmill gained value with the construction between 1792 and 1794 of the Philadelphia and Lancaster Turnpike, which runs right past the mill (as of 2007 located behind a car dealership). A shed covering the mill's exterior waterwheel foreshadowed the widespread use of interior waterwheels in the region after 1750. Powered by a Model T engine, the mill was making apple cider as late as 1957 after two centuries of grinding corn, wheat, oats, and plaster as well as sawing lumber. Most of the mill machinery remains intact despite long disuse. The Thomas family owned the property through the 1980s if not later.

In 2007, the Daily Local News cited a study funded by the Pennsylvania Historical and Museum Commission, declaring the mill "one of the oldest and most significant historic structures in the township." Conservation work was completed on the building in 2003.

In 2007, dendrochronological analysis confirmed that timbers in the mill building date to 1744.

== See also ==
- National Register of Historic Places listings in eastern Chester County, Pennsylvania
