= Polly of the Circus =

Polly of the Circus may refer to:

- Polly of the Circus (1907 play), written by Margaret Mayo, or its two screen adaptations:
  - Polly of the Circus (1917 film), featuring Mae Marsh and Vernon Steele
  - Polly of the Circus (1932 film), starring Marion Davies and Clark Gable
