= Senator Fincher =

Senator Fincher may refer to:

- Dan H. Fincher (born 1931), Georgia State Senate
- Dick Fincher (1927–2002), Florida State Senate
- W. W. Fincher Jr. (1914–2006), Georgia State Senate
