= Senator Thomas =

Senator Thomas may refer to:

== Members of the United States Senate ==
- Charles S. Thomas (1849–1934), U.S. Senator from Colorado from 1913 to 1921
- Craig L. Thomas (1933–2007), U.S. Senator from Wyoming from 1995 to 2007
- Elbert D. Thomas (1883–1953), U.S. Senator from Utah from 1933 until 1951
- Elmer Thomas (1876–1965), U.S. Senator from Oklahoma from 1927 to 1951
- Jesse B. Thomas (1777–1853), U.S Senator from Illinois from 1818 to 1829
- John Thomas (Idaho politician) (1874–1945), U.S. Senator from Idaho from 1928 to 1933 and from 1940 to 1945

== United States state senate members ==
- Adam Thomas (politician) (fl. 2010s–present), Kansas State Senate
- Amos Thomas (Nebraska politician) (1882–1962), Nebraska State Senate
- Buzz Thomas (born 1969), Michigan State Senate
- Cecil Thomas (politician) (born 1952), Ohio State Senate
- Charles Thomas (Delaware governor) (1790–1848), Delaware State Senate
- Charles W. Thomas (politician) (1860–1907), Pennsylvania State Senate
- Christopher Thomas (1818–1879), Virginia State Senate
- David L. Thomas (born 1949), South Carolina State Senate
- Dorsey B. Thomas (1823–1897), Tennessee State Senate
- Douglas Thomas (Maine politician) (fl. 2010s), Maine State Senate
- Edward B. Thomas (1848–1929), New York State Senate
- Fred Thomas (American politician) (born 1958), Montana State Senate
- Henry F. Thomas (1843–1912), Michigan State Senate
- James Thomas (Governor of Maryland) (1785–1845), Maryland State Senate
- Jerry Thomas (Florida politician) (1929–1980), Florida State Senate
- Jerry Thomas (Louisiana politician) (1953–2023), Louisiana State Senate
- Joe Thomas (Alaska politician) (born 1948), Alaska State Senate
- John E. Thomas (politician) (1829–1910), Wisconsin State Senate
- Kevin Thomas (politician) (fl. 2010s), New York State Senate
- Lanny Thomas (fl. 2020s), Georgia State Senate
- Lowell Thomas Jr. (1923–2016), Alaska State Senate
- Nadine Thomas (born 1952), Georgia State Senate
- Ormsby B. Thomas (1832–1904), Wisconsin State Senate
- Pat Thomas (politician) (1933–2000), Florida State Senate
- Paul Thomas (politician) (fl. 2020s), North Dakota State Senate
- Ralph W. Thomas (1862–1920), New York State Senate
- Ray Thomas (Nebraska politician) (1883–1945), Nebraska State Senate
- Reese Samuel Thomas (1918–2011), Georgia State Senate
- Reggie Thomas (born 1953), Kentucky State Senate
- Regina Thomas (born 1951), Georgia State Senate
- Richard Thomas (Pennsylvania politician) (1744–1832), Pennsylvania State Senate
- Scott Thomas (district attorney) (born 1966), North Carolina State Senate
- William Holland Thomas (1805–1893), North Carolina State Senate
- William Reuben Thomas (1866–1943), Florida State Senate
- William W. Thomas Jr. (1839–1927), Maine State Senate
