= My Lady Friends =

1921 film

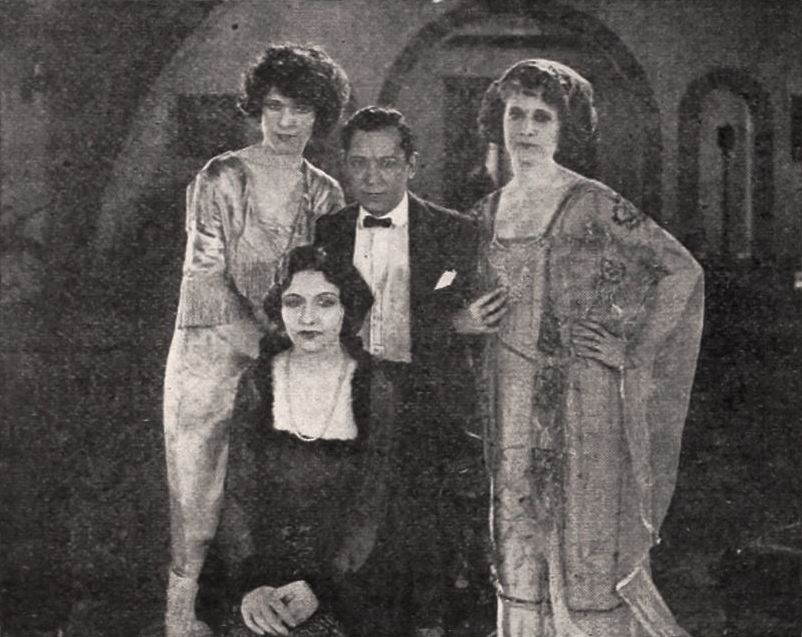
- Directed by: Lloyd Ingraham
- Written by: Rex Taylor
- Based on: My Lady Friends by Frank Mandel and Emil Nyitray
- Produced by: Carter DeHaven
- Starring: Carter DeHaven; Flora Parker DeHaven; Thomas G. Lingham
- Cinematography: Barney McGill
- Production company: Carter De Haven Productions
- Distributed by: Associated First National Pictures
- Release date: October 31, 1921
- Running time: 60 minutes
- Country: United States
- Languages: Silent; English intertitles

My Lady Friends is a 1921 American silent comedy film directed by Lloyd Ingraham and starring Carter DeHaven, Flora Parker DeHaven and Thomas G. Lingham. It was based on the 1919 Broadway play of the same title by Frank Mandel and Emil Nyitray.

== Cast ==
- Carter DeHaven as James Smith
- Flora Parker DeHaven as Catherine Smith
- Thomas G. Lingham as Edward Early
- Helen Raymond as Lucille Early
- Helen Lynch as Eva Johns
- Lincoln Stedman as Tom Trainer
- May Wallace as Hilda
- Hazel Howell as Nora
- Clara Morris as Gwen
- Ruth Ashby as Julia

== Bibliography ==
- Connelly, Robert B. The Silents: Silent Feature Films, 1910-36, Volume 40, Issue 2. December Press, 1998.
- Munden, Kenneth White. The American Film Institute Catalog of Motion Pictures Produced in the United States, Part 1. University of California Press, 1997.
