= Ida St. Leon =

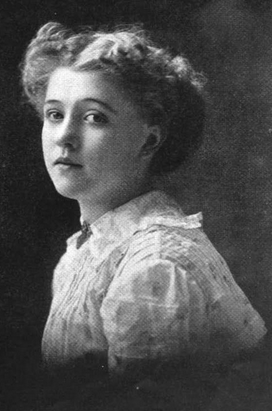
Ida St. Leon, from a 1909 publication.

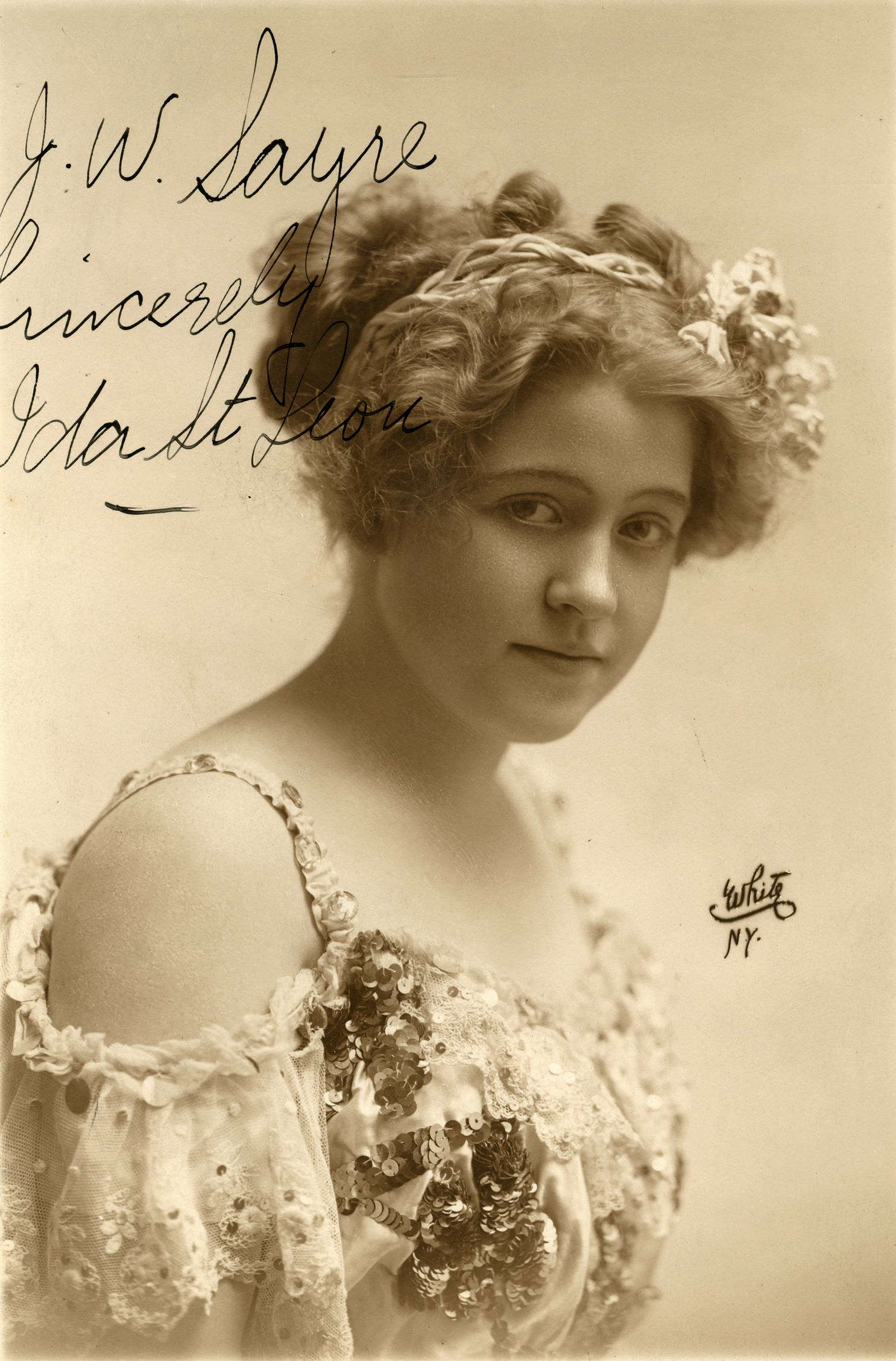
Ida St. Leon publicity photo with signature

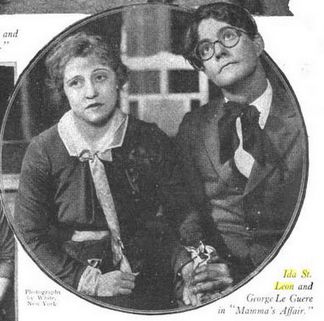
Ida St. Leon and George Le Guere, in Mamma's Affair, from a 1920 publication

Ida St. Leon (16 January 1894 – 8 July 1961) was an Australian circus performer and actress.

== Early life ==
Ida Jeannie Jones was born in Sydney, Australia, though some publicity suggested she was born in China. Her parents were Alfred St. Leon and Vernon Ida St. Leon of the "Famous St. Leon Family of European Acrobats". As her parents' work suggests, the younger Ida and her siblings were working as circus performers from an early age. When Ida was thirteen, the family were on Broadway, in Margaret Mayo's show Polly of the Circus (1907); Ida St. Leon took over the lead role from Mabel Taliaferro in 1909, and toured with the show for a few years after that.

== Career ==
Stage credits for Ida St. Leon included Finishing Fanny (1912), Our Children (1913), Help Wanted (1914), Little Women (1914), Upstairs and Down (1916), Rachel Barton Butler's Mamma's Affair (1917), The Wheel (1921), and Lightnin (1923).

Of her work in Rebecca of Sunnybrook Farm (1916), one unimpressed Los Angeles critic wrote that "Ida St. Leon drawls out her snippy lines in that nasal twang described as 'cute.'" Photographers considered her photograph a "bestseller" in 1913.

== Personal life ==
Ida St. Leon's engagement to businessman Leo Maurice Rosenberg was announced in 1916. The Rosenbergs had a son, Leo in 1917, were "estranged" from 1918 to 1920, then reunited. She was named a co-respondent in the divorce of Eugenia and George McIntyre, with accusations that Ida St. Leon was being "overfriendly" with the husband, and accepting significant gifts of cash from him.
