= The Girl in the Taxi (1921 film) =

1921 film by Lloyd Ingraham

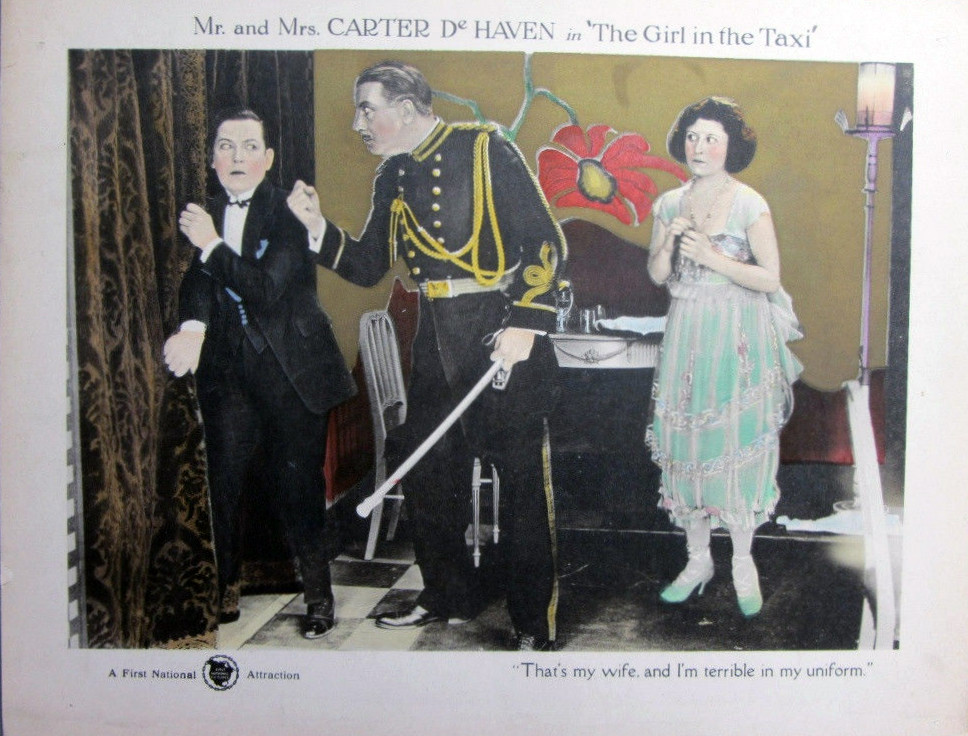
- Lobby card
- Directed by: Lloyd Ingraham
- Written by: Robert A. McGowan (adaptation)
- Based on: The Girl in the Taxi by Frederick Fenn; Arthur Wimperis
- Produced by: Carter DeHaven
- Starring: Flora Parker DeHaven; Carter DeHaven; King Baggot; Grace Cunard; Otis Harlan
- Cinematography: Ross Fisher
- Edited by: George Crone
- Production company: Carter De Haven Productions
- Distributed by: Associated First National Pictures
- Release date: April 1921
- Running time: 6 reels
- Country: United States
- Languages: Silent film (English intertitles)

The Girl in the Taxi is a 1921 American silent comedy film directed by Lloyd Ingraham and starring Flora Parker DeHaven, Carter DeHaven, King Baggot, Grace Cunard, and Otis Harlan. It is based on the 1912 English-language adaptation of German play by Frederick Fenn and Arthur Wimperis. The film was released by Associated First National Pictures in April 1921.

== Cast ==
- Flora Parker DeHaven as Mignon Smith (as Mrs. Carter De Haven)
- Carter DeHaven as Bertie Stewart
- King Baggot as Maj. Frederick Smith
- Grace Cunard as Marietta
- Otis Harlan as Alexis
- Tom McGuire as John Stewart
- Margaret Campbell as Clara Stewart
- Lincoln Plumer as Percy Peters
- Freya Sterling as Mary Peters
- John Gough as Dr. Paul

== Preservation ==
A complete print of The Girl in the Taxi survives in the BFI National Archive.
