= Twin Beds (1920 film) =

1920 film directed by Lloyd Ingraham

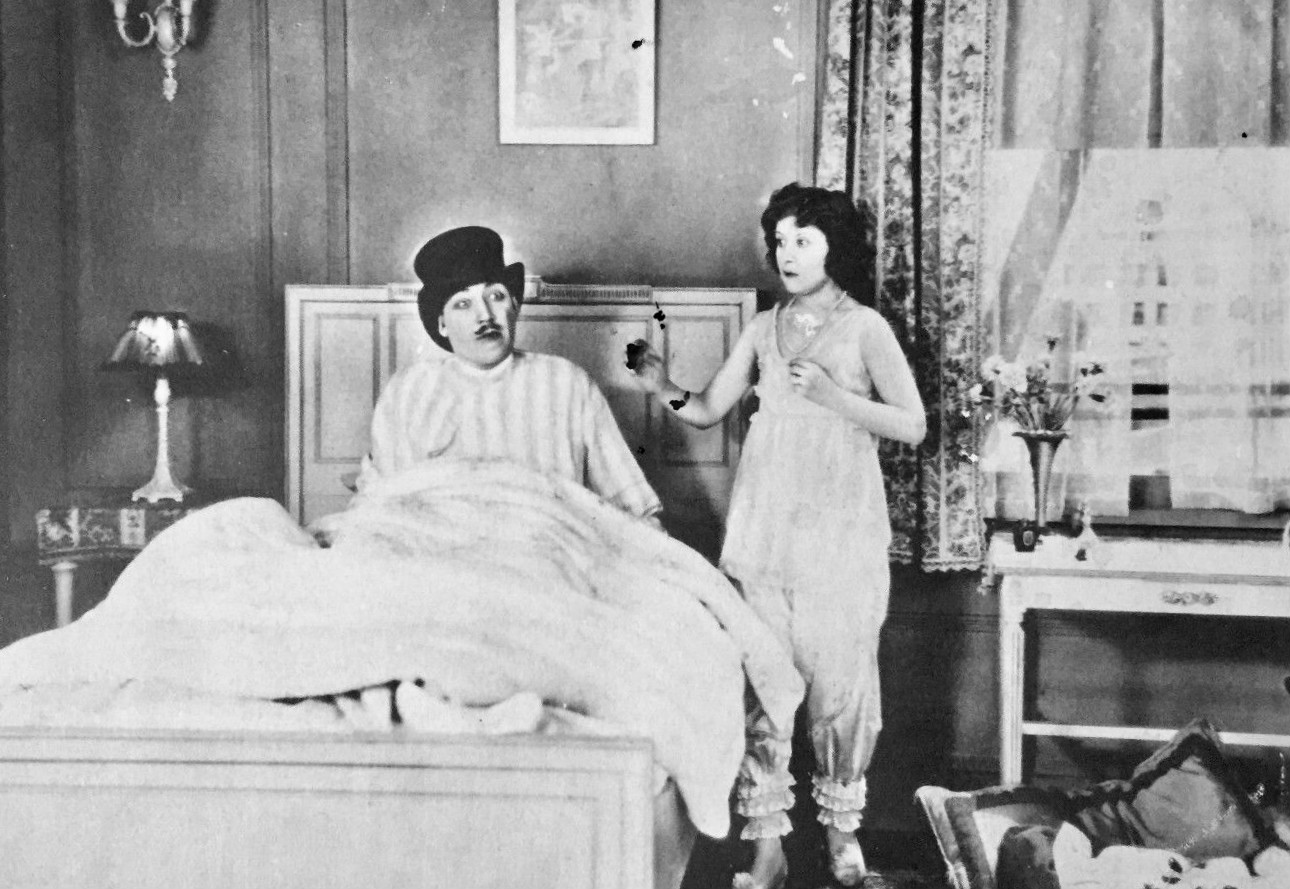
- Lobby card
- Directed by: Lloyd Ingraham
- Written by: Rex Taylor; Robert F. McGowan
- Based on: Twin Beds by Salisbury Field and Margaret Mayo
- Produced by: Carter DeHaven
- Starring: Carter DeHaven; Flora Parker DeHaven
- Cinematography: Ross Fisher
- Distributed by: First National Pictures
- Release date: October 31, 1920
- Running time: 60 minutes
- Country: United States
- Language: Silent (English intertitles)

Twin Beds is a lost 1920 American silent film comedy directed by Lloyd Ingraham and starring Carter DeHaven and Flora Parker DeHaven. It was based on a 1914 Broadway play Twin Beds by Salisbury Field and Margaret Mayo. Carter DeHaven produced the film, and it was released by First National Pictures.

== Cast ==
- Carter DeHaven as Signor Monti
- Flora Parker DeHaven as Blanche Hawkins
- Helen Raymond as Signora Monti
- William Desmond as Harry Hawkins
- Katherine Lewis as Amanda Tate
- William Irving as Andrew Larkin
- Lottie Williams as Nora
- Jack Carlyle (Undetermined Role) (credited as J. Montgomery Carlyle)
