= The College Orphan =

1915 film by William C. Dowlan

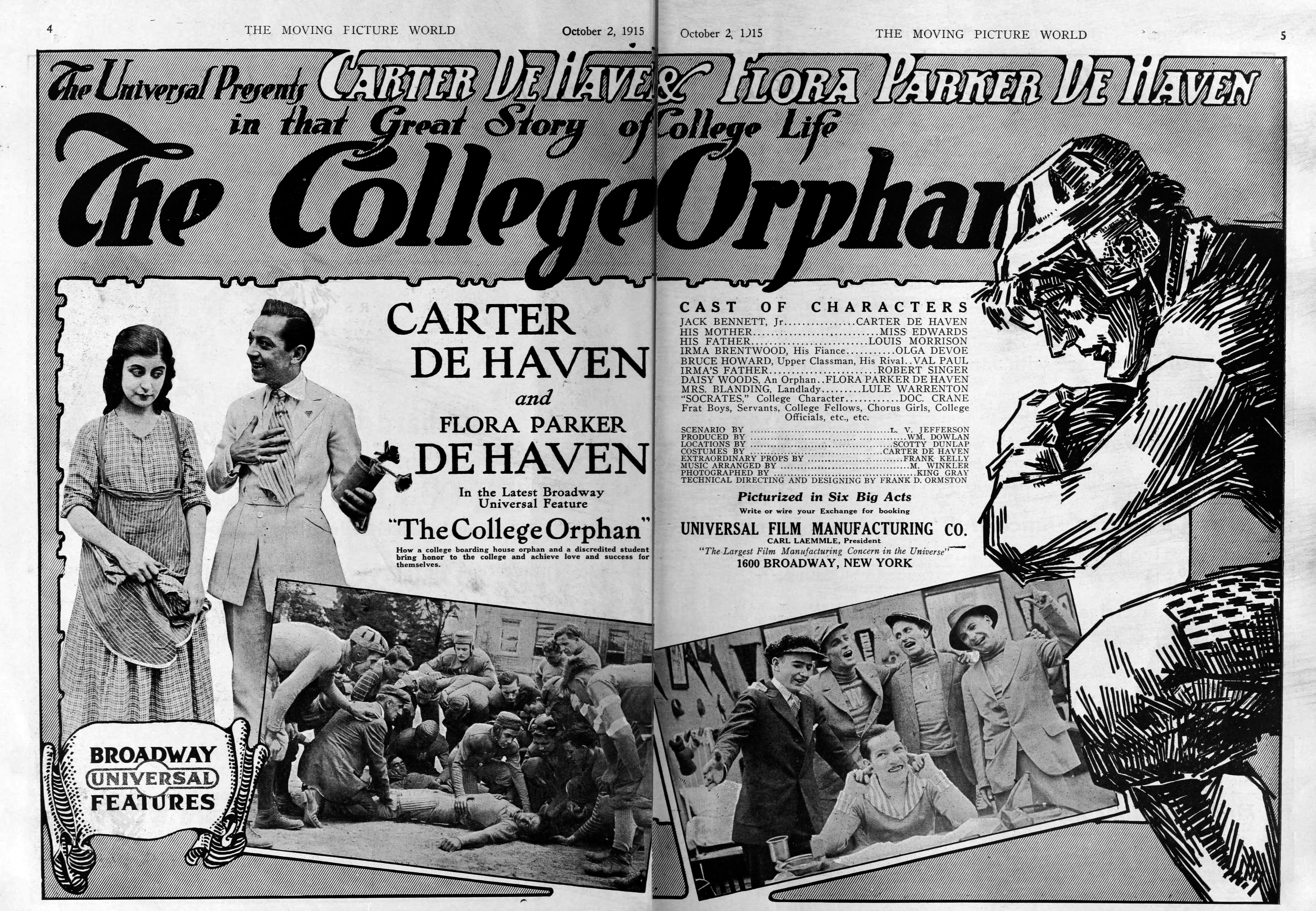
- Advertisement for the College Orphan in the Moving Picture World October 2, 1915 issue (pg. 4-5)
- Directed by: William C. Dowlan
- Written by: Louis V. Jefferson
- Starring: Carter DeHaven; Flora Parker DeHaven; Miss Edwards
- Cinematography: King Gray
- Production company: Universal Film Manufacturing Company
- Distributed by: Universal Film Manufacturing Company
- Release date: October 25, 1915
- Running time: 6 reels
- Country: United States
- Languages: Silent film (English intertitles)

The College Orphan (also known as At Watt College) is a 1915 American silent comedy-drama film directed by William C. Dowlan and starring Carter DeHaven, Flora Parker DeHaven, and Miss Edwards. The film was released by Universal Film Manufacturing Company on October 25, 1915.

== Cast ==
- Carter DeHaven as Jack Bennett Jr.
- Flora Parker DeHaven as Daisy Woods
- Miss Edwards as Mrs. Bennett
- Louis Morrison as Mr. Bennett
- Gloria Fonda as Irma Brentwood
- Val Paul as Bruce Howard
- Lule Warrenton as Mrs. Blanding
- William Canfield as Mr. Brentwood
- Doc Crane as Socrates

== Reception ==
Moving Picture World gave the film a positive review, praising performances of the DeHaven couple while criticizing some of scenes, claiming they were questioning the "probability of the action of the students in trying to soften the blows of masculine football by substituting the antics of sissies" and that were known in previous occasions to make the "unskillful laugh".

== Preservation ==
It is unknown whether the film survives as none of copies were able to locate, likely presumed lost.
