= Twin Beds (1929 film) =

1929 film

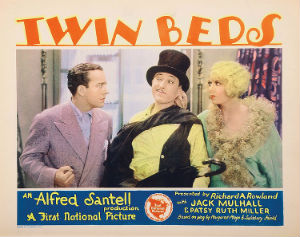
- Lobby card
- Directed by: Alfred Santell
- Screenplay by: F. McGrew Willis
- Based on: Twin Beds by: Edward Salisbury Field; Margaret Mayo
- Starring: Jack Mulhall; Patsy Ruth Miller; Edythe Chapman; Knute Erickson; Jocelyn Lee; Nita Martan
- Cinematography: Sol Polito
- Edited by: LeRoy Stone
- Production company: First National Pictures
- Distributed by: Warner Bros. Pictures
- Release date: July 14, 1929
- Running time: 70 minutes
- Country: United States
- Language: English

Twin Beds is a 1929 American sound (All-Talking) comedy film directed by Alfred Santell and written by F. McGrew Willis. It is based on the 1914 play Twin Beds by Edward Salisbury Field and Margaret Mayo. The film stars Jack Mulhall, Patsy Ruth Miller, Edythe Chapman, Knute Erickson, Jocelyn Lee and Nita Martan. The film was released by Warner Bros. Pictures on July 14, 1929. Previously filmed in 1920, Twin Beds was memorably remade in 1942 with George Brent, Joan Bennett and Mischa Auer.

== Plot ==
Elsie Dolan, a hard-working telephone operator, has spent every night of her life crammed in bed with her sisters, Maizie and Bobby. Her modest dream is a married life of luxury: a honeymoon in Europe, and more importantly twin beds - so she can finally sleep without sharing.

While fleeing an overbearing married man from Grand Rapids, Elsie injures her leg and limps into a doctor's office—where she meets Danny Brown, a Broadway composer and “show doctor.” Sparks fly, and soon they're engaged.

On the eve of their wedding, they clash over priorities: Danny refuses a trip to Europe on financial grounds and scoffs at the idea of twin beds. They compromise: no European honeymoon, but yes to the twin beds.

Elsie rents a chic apartment with twin beds, which happens to be in the same building as volatile matinee idol Monty Solari, his fiery wife, and the quirky couple Mr. and Mrs. Jason Treejohn.

On their wedding night, Danny is urgently called to the theater to rehearse Solari's understudy—Solari having vanished drunk—and leaves the door unlocked so as not to wake Elsie.

Around 4 a.m., a thoroughly intoxicated Solari stumbles into the wrong apartment, strips, puts on Danny's pajamas, and crawls into one of the twin beds. Because of the separate beds, Elsie doesn't notice—until it's too late.

Chaos erupts when Danny comes home, finding the wrong man asleep in his pajamas. Elsie struggles to remove the drunken actor quietly while Danny—seeing his pajamas on another man—jumps to conclusions. She tries to shoo Solari out the window discreetly.

Meanwhile, Mr. Jason Treejohn, awakened by the noise, chases Solari down the fire escape, mistaking him for a burglar. Everyone ends up in the Browns’ apartment. Tempers flare, accusations fly, and the twin beds are declared the root of the trouble.

Danny, still fuming, finally agrees to take Elsie on the European honeymoon—if only to escape further absurdity.

But fate has one last laugh: their shipboard cabin has twin beds too. In the final gag, one of the twin beds is hurled overboard, drifting out to sea—where a flock of gulls promptly lands, claiming Elsie's dream of solitude for themselves.

== Cast ==
- Jack Mulhall as Danny Brown
- Patsy Ruth Miller as Elsie Dolan
- Edythe Chapman as Ma Dolan
- Knute Erickson as Pa Dolan
- Jocelyn Lee as Mazie Dolan
- Nita Martan as Bobby Dolan
- ZaSu Pitts as Tillie
- Armand Kaliz as Monty Solari
- Gertrude Astor as Mrs. Solari
- Carl M. Leviness as Jason Treejohn
- Alice Lake as Mrs. Treejohn
- Ben Hendricks Jr. as Pete Trapp
- Eddie Gribbon as Red Trapp
- Bert Roach as Edward J. Small

== Music ==
The theme songs for the film were written by written by Alfred Bryan and George W. Meyer. The main theme song was entitled "If You Were Mine" and is played frequently as background music by the Vitaphone orchestra throughout the film. "The Chicken Walk," and "My Wee Bonnie Jean" are the secondary theme songs.

== See also ==
- List of early sound feature films (1926–1929)
