= Marry the Poor Girl =

1921 film

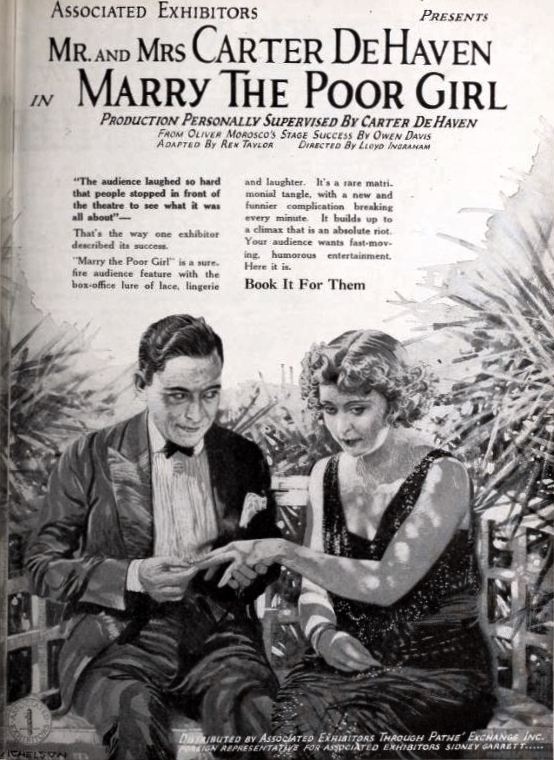
- Directed by: Lloyd Ingraham
- Written by: Rex Taylor
- Based on: Marry the Poor Girl by Owen Davis
- Produced by: Carter DeHaven
- Starring: Carter DeHaven; Flora Parker DeHaven
- Cinematography: Barney McGill
- Production company: Carter De Haven Productions
- Distributed by: Associated Exhibitors
- Release date: December 11, 1921
- Running time: 60 minutes
- Country: United States
- Languages: Silent; English intertitles

Marry the Poor Girl is a 1921 American silent comedy film directed by Lloyd Ingraham and starring Carter DeHaven and Flora Parker DeHaven. It was based on the 1920 Broadway play of the same name by Owen Davis.The Exhibitor's Trade Review noted that the "excellent" supporting cast were not credited onscreen "possibly because it was intended to keep only the two principals in the limelight".

== Cast ==
- Carter DeHaven as Jack Tanner
- Flora Parker DeHaven as Julia Paddington

== Bibliography ==
- Connelly, Robert B. The Silents: Silent Feature Films, 1910-36, Volume 40, Issue 2. December Press, 1998.
- Munden, Kenneth White. The American Film Institute Catalog of Motion Pictures Produced in the United States, Part 1. University of California Press, 1997.
