= Brownsville, Illinois =

Brownsville, Illinois may refer to the following places in Illinois:

- Brownsville, Jackson County, Illinois, a ghost town
- Brownsville, White County, Illinois, an unincorporated community
