= Edward Salisbury Field =

American novelist

Edward Salisbury Field Jr. (February 28, 1878 – September 20, 1936) was an American author, playwright, artist, poet, and journalist.

== Biography ==
He was born on February 28, 1878, in Indianapolis, Indiana, to Edward Salisbury and Sarah Mills Hubbard Field. He was the husband of Isobel Osbourne (the step-daughter of Robert Louis Stevenson) and he was step-father of playwright Austin Strong (Isobel's son from a former marriage).

Field was an employee and friend of William Randolf Hearst where he made drawings for Hearst newspapers, signing his drawings with the nom de plume Childe Harold. As a young news man in his 20s, Field became the secretary, protégé, and possibly lover of Fanny Stevenson (who was 38 years older), after the death of her husband Robert Louis Stevenson. After Fanny's death in 1914, Field married her daughter, Isobel Osbourne, who was 20 years his senior. Field became a successful Southern California real estate developer. In the 1920s, oil was discovered on some of his property which made them wealthy.

In 1926, Field purchased Zaca Lake and surrounding land on Figueroa Mountain near Los Olivos, California. His wife, Isobel, built an artists studio there, and the Field home became a popular meeting place for writers and actors.

Field's best known works were the film scripts for Wedding Bells (based on his play of the same name) and Twin Beds (based on his 1913 novel and its stage adaptation). Twin Beds was filmed four times: as Twin Beds in 1920 starring Carter and Flora Parker DeHaven; Twin Beds in 1929 starring Jack Mulhall; as The Life of the Party in 1934; and as Twin Beds in 1942 with George Brent and Joan Bennett.

Field died September 20, 1936, at Zaca Lake, of an apparent heart attack while taking a nap. He was 58 years old.

== Bibliography ==
- Field, Edward Salisbury (1904). The Quest, and Other Poems. R.G. Badger, The Gorham Press.
- Harold, Childe (1905). A Child's Book of Abridged Wisdom. Edward Salisbury Field. Paul Elder & Company.
- Field, Edward Salisbury (1906). In Pursuit of Priscilla: A Chronicle of the Man Willing and the Woman Wilful. Will Grefé (illustrator). Henry Altemus Company.
- Field, Edward Salisbury (1907). A Six-Cylinder Courtship. Clarence F. Underwood (illustrator). Grosset & Dunlap.
- Field, Edward Salisbury (1909). Cupids Understudy. Will Grefé (illustrator). Grosset & Dunlap.
- Field, Edward Salisbury (1910). The Sapphire Bracelet. Will Grefé (illustrator). New York City, NY: W.J. Watt and Company.
- Field, Edward Salisbury (1911). The Purple Stockings. New York City, NY: W.J. Watt and Company.
- Field, Edward Salisbury (1912). The Rented Earl. Will Grefé (illustrator). New York City, NY: W.J. Watt and Company.
- Field, Edward Salisbury (1913). Twin Beds. Grosset & Dunlap.
