= Twin Beds (1942 film) =

1942 film by Tim Whelan

- Theatrical poster
- Directed by: Tim Whelan
- Written by: Kenneth Earl; Curtis Kenyon; Eddie Moran
- Based on: Play by Salisbury Field; Margaret Mayo
- Produced by: Edward Small
- Starring: George Brent; Joan Bennett
- Cinematography: Hal Mohr
- Edited by: Francis D. Lyon; Grant Whytock
- Music by: Dimitri Tiomkin
- Production company: Edward Small Productions
- Distributed by: United Artists
- Release date: April 30, 1942
- Running time: 85 minutes
- Country: United States
- Language: English

Twin Beds is a 1942 American comedy film directed by Tim Whelan, and starring by George Brent and Joan Bennett. It was distributed by United Artists. The screenplay was written by Kenneth Earl, Curtis Kenyon and Eddie Moran, based on the play of the same name by Salisbury Field and Margaret Mayo.

== Plot ==
Even as they walk down the aisle to be joined in holy matrimony, Julie and Mike Abbott argue about her extensive involvement in the USO. For starters, her obligations are in the way of their honeymoon trip.

After a short while of marriage, Mike is tired of Julie's constant working, not being able to spend much time with him at all. Also, the tabloids has a lot of theories about who is to pursue and catch her. On top of this, Julie is involved in arranging an engagement party for her ex-boyfriend, Larky, who is now going to marry her friend Lydia. The party prevents Mike and Julie from having the quiet dinner at home he had planned.

The party is a catastrophe for Mike, who is appalled by all the snobs attending, and jealous of all the men pursuing his wife during the evening. Among others, Nicolai Cherupin, a Russian opera tenor who lives next door, is very keen on socializing with Julie. His wife tells Mike he should watch out, and Mike eventually throws the man out of their apartment. Julie is upset and tells Mike she disapproves of his mistrust in her. In the heat of the moment Mike suggests they replace their double bed with twin beds. A while later the couple make up, but the sound of opera singing reaches them from outside.

Mike demands they move to another building to get rid of the persistent singer. He isn't aware that the singer's wife, Sonya also has decided they should move to a new place, jealous of her husband's shameless behavior. Lydia also wants to move, since she is worried Larky will fall back in love with Julie.

It turns out all three couples move to the same new building. Julie has arranged for twin beds, apparently listening to Mike's angry remark during the party. The singer is convinced that Julie has followed him to the new building because she is infatuated with him. He starts to sing to her, and subsequently Mike decides to leave Julie, believing that she has led the singer on.

Julie rejects the singer's attempt to meet her. He goes to a bar and gets plastered, and when he returns to the building, he is mistakenly let into Mike and Julie's apartment by the door man. The singer falls asleep in Mike's bed, where he is found the next morning by the very disturbed Julie.

Mike boards a train to Canada, but is persuaded by a fellow traveler to return and win Julie back. Upon his arrival back to the apartment, Julie is trying to get rid of the singer. When Julie sees Mike coming, she makes the singer hide in a trunk to avoid him being even more jealous.

The singer's clothes are mistaken for Mike's and the maid takes them to the cleaners. The singer tries to borrow and dress in Mike's clothes, but is constantly interrupted by visitors, forcing him to hide again. The maid eventually removes all clothes from the room and the singer is forced to escape by climbing out the window and down the fire escape.

The singer is caught climbing by Lydia, who believes he is a burglar trying to get in, and he has to flee back up into the apartment bedroom. Larky comes around, finds the singer and starts chasing him. The singer manages to trick Larky, steal his clothes and lock him into a room. Still in his underwear, the singer meets Sonya when she arrives to the apartment with a private investigator whom she has hired to follow her husband.

Larky is released from his prison and the singer is found hidden, in his underwear, in the trunk. Mike and Julie decide to move again, and after they make up they choose to return to their old apartment.

== Main cast ==
- George Brent as Mike Abbott
- Joan Bennett as Julie Abbott
- Mischa Auer as Nicolai Cherupin
- Una Merkel as Lydia
- Glenda Farrell as Sonya Cherupin
- Ernest Truex as Larky
- Margaret Hamilton as Norah

== Production ==
The play had been filmed previously in 1920 and 1929. In 1941 Edward Small announced plans to remake it. Dick Powell was mentioned as a possible male lead with Richard Murphy to direct but in the end George Brent was cast under Tim Whelan's director. Filming started in September 1941.

It was the first of several farces based on old plays Small made during World War II.

== Reception ==
Reviews were mixed.
