= Polly of the Circus (1932 film) =

1932 film

- Theatrical release poster
- Directed by: Alfred Santell
- Written by: Laurence E. Johnson (dialogue); Carey Wilson
- Based on: Polly of the Circus; 1907 play by Margaret Mayo
- Produced by: Marion Davies
- Starring: Marion Davies; Clark Gable
- Cinematography: George Barnes
- Edited by: George Hively
- Music by: William Axt
- Production companies: Cosmopolitan Productions; Metro-Goldwyn-Mayer
- Distributed by: Loew's Inc.
- Release date: February 27, 1932
- Running time: 69 minutes
- Country: United States
- Language: English
- Budget: $438,000
- Box office: $700,000

Polly of the Circus is a 1932 American pre-Code drama film directed by Alfred Santell and starring Marion Davies and Clark Gable.

== Plot ==
When a traveling circus arrives in a small town, trapeze artist Polly Fisher is outraged to find that clothing has been added to posters of her to hide her moderately skimpy costume. She goes to see the man she mistakenly holds responsible, Reverend John Hartley. He denies being the censor, but their relationship gets off to a rocky start.

When a heckler distracts Polly during her performance, she falls 50 feet (15 m) to the ground. John Hartley has her brought to his nearby house. The doctor advises against moving her. As she recuperates, Polly and John fall in love and marry. She willingly gives up the circus for him.

John's uncle, Bishop James Northcott, questions the wisdom of the union, and John's congregation rebels at having an ex-circus performer as their minister's wife. As a result, he is fired and cannot obtain another church position because of his marriage.

Seeing how miserable her husband is, Polly goes to plead for the bishop's help, but he remains unmoved. When she tells Northcott she is willing to give John up, the clergyman tells her that a divorced minister is just as unacceptable. Polly sees only one way out - as a widower, John could return to the church. She pretends that she has tired of her husband and returns to the circus, planning to have a fatal "accident". However, Northcott has a change of heart. When he goes to tell the couple, Polly has already left. Northcott guesses what she intends to do. He and John speed to the circus' next stop and arrive just in time to save Polly.

== Cast ==
- Marion Davies as Pauline 'Polly' Fisher
- Clark Gable as Reverend John Hartley
- C. Aubrey Smith as Bishop James Northcott
- Raymond Hatton as Downey, Hartley's servant
- David Landau as Beef, the circus manager who raised Polly
- Ruth Selwyn as Mitzi
- Maude Eburne as Mrs. Jennings
- "Little Billy" Rhodes as Half-Pint
- Guinn Williams as Eric Alvarez
- Clark Marshall as Don Alvarez
- Lillian Elliott as Mrs. McNamara, a friend of the Hartleys
- Ray Milland as Church Usher (uncredited)

== Sources ==
The story started as a short novel by Margaret Mayo which she then adapted as a script for a 1907 play, Polly of the Circus, written for the entertainment magnet Frederic Thompson. The play, complete with a live circus and other spectacles on stage designed by Thompson, was Broadway success and eventually had several productions playing in cities around the country.

=== First film adaptation of the play ===
A silent film version of the Margaret Mayo play was made in 1917, the first film by Goldwyn Pictures. It was shot in Fort Lee, New Jersey at Universal Studios when it and many other early film studios in America's first motion picture industry were based there at the beginning of the 20th century.

== Box office ==
According to MGM records, the film earned $530,000 in the US and Canada and $170,000 elsewhere resulting in a profit of $20,000.
