= King Brockett =

American baseball player (1880-1960)

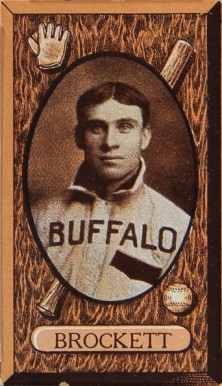
- Pitcher
- Born: July 23, 1880; Brownsville, White County, Illinois, U.S.
- Died: September 19, 1960 (aged 80); Norris City, Illinois, U.S.
- Batted: Right Threw: Right

MLB debut
- April 13, 1907, for the New York Highlanders

Last MLB appearance
- July 26, 1911, for the New York Highlanders

MLB statistics
- Win–loss record: 13–14
- Earned run average: 3.43
- Strikeouts: 108
- Stats at Baseball Reference

Teams
- New York Highlanders (1907, 1909, 1911)

Lewis Albert "King" Brockett (July 23, 1880 – September 19, 1960) was an American Major League Baseball pitcher. Brockett played for the New York Highlanders in 1907, 1909, and 1911. In 50 career games, he had a 13–14 record with a 3.43 earned run average. Brockett batted and threw right-handed.

Brocket died at his home in Norris City, Illinois on September 19, 1960 after a long illness.
