= Gloria DeHaven =

American actress and singer (1925–2016)

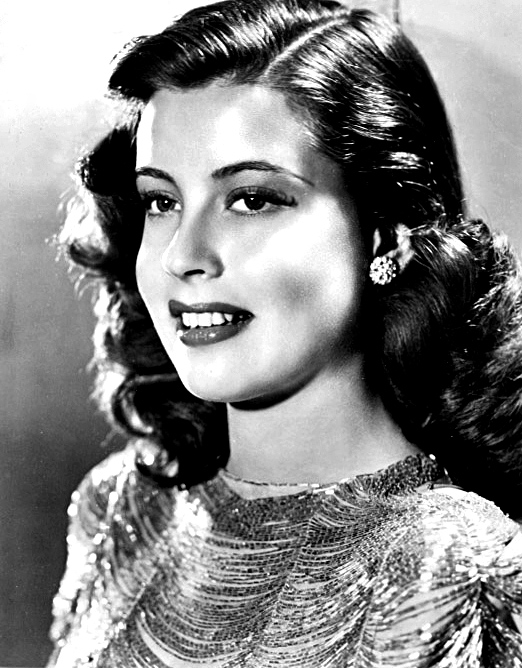
- Publicity photo, 1953
- Born: Gloria Mildred DeHaven; July 23, 1925; Los Angeles, California, US
- Died: July 30, 2016 (aged 91); Las Vegas, Nevada, US
- Occupations: Actress; singer
- Years active: 1936–2000
- Spouses: John Payne (m. 1944; div. 1950) Martin Kimmel (m. 1953; div. 1954) Richard Fincher (m. 1957; div. 1963) (m. 1965; div. 1969)
- Children: 4
- Parent(s): Carter DeHaven; Flora Parker DeHaven

Gloria Mildred DeHaven (July 23, 1925 – July 30, 2016) was an American actress and singer who was a contract star for Metro-Goldwyn-Mayer (MGM).

== Early life ==
DeHaven was born in Los Angeles, California, the daughter of actor-director Carter DeHaven and actress Flora Parker DeHaven, both former vaudeville performers. A 1983 newspaper article reported, "Miss DeHaven ... says that her real family name was O'Callahan before her father legally changed his name to DeHaven."

== Film ==
She began her career as a child actor with a bit part in Charlie Chaplin's Modern Times (1936). She was signed to a contract with MGM. She had featured roles in films such as Best Foot Forward (1943), The Thin Man Goes Home (1944), Scene of the Crime (1949) and Summer Stock (1950), and was voted by exhibitors as the third most likely to be a "star of tomorrow" in 1944. She portrayed her own mother, Flora Parker DeHaven, in the Fred Astaire film Three Little Words (1950).

After a long absence from the screen, DeHaven appeared as the love interest of Jack Lemmon in the comedy Out to Sea (1997), also starring Walter Matthau.

== Music ==
DeHaven's musical talents supplemented her acting abilities. Besides being cast as a singer in many of her films including I'll Get By, So This Is Paris and The Girl Rush, and performing numbers in many of her movies, DeHaven sang with the bands of Jan Savitt and Bob Crosby and briefly had her own nightclub act. In the 1950s, DeHaven often appeared at the El Rancho Vegas, the first full service hotel casino on the Las Vegas Strip. During the early 1960s, DeHaven recorded for the small Seeco label, for which she appeared on the 1962 compilation album Gloria Lynne and Her Friends. She was also heard on four of the Revisited compilations produced by Ben Bagley.

== Television ==
DeHaven appeared in the soap operas Ryan's Hope (as Bess Shelby), As the World Turns (as Sara Fuller) and Mary Hartman, Mary Hartman. She was one of the numerous celebrities who appeared in the all-star box-office flop Won Ton Ton, the Dog Who Saved Hollywood (1976), and guest-starred in several television series including Robert Montgomery Presents; Appointment with Adventure (episode entitled "The Snow People"); The Guy Mitchell Show; Johnny Ringo (as Rosemary Blake in "Love Affair"); The Rifleman; Wagon Train; The Lloyd Bridges Show; Flipper; Marcus Welby, M.D.; Gunsmoke; Mannix; The Jimmy Stewart Show; The Eddie Capra Mysteries; Fantasy Island; Hart to Hart; The Love Boat; Mama's Family; Highway to Heaven; Murder, She Wrote; and Touched by an Angel. On March 21, 1974, Gloria appeared as a guest on The Tonight Show Starring Johnny Carson. Later that year, she was cast in the short-lived police drama Nakia. She also appeared with Horace Heidt in 1955 on The Swift Show Wagon with Horace Heidt and the American Way.

From January 1969 to February 1971, DeHaven hosted a morning call-in movie show on WABC-TV in New York City. She also appeared on five episodes of Match Game 75 as a guest panelist.

== Stage ==
DeHaven's Broadway debut was in 1955. She played Diane in the musical version of Seventh Heaven. She also toured in a summer stock production of No, No, Nanette.

== Personal life ==
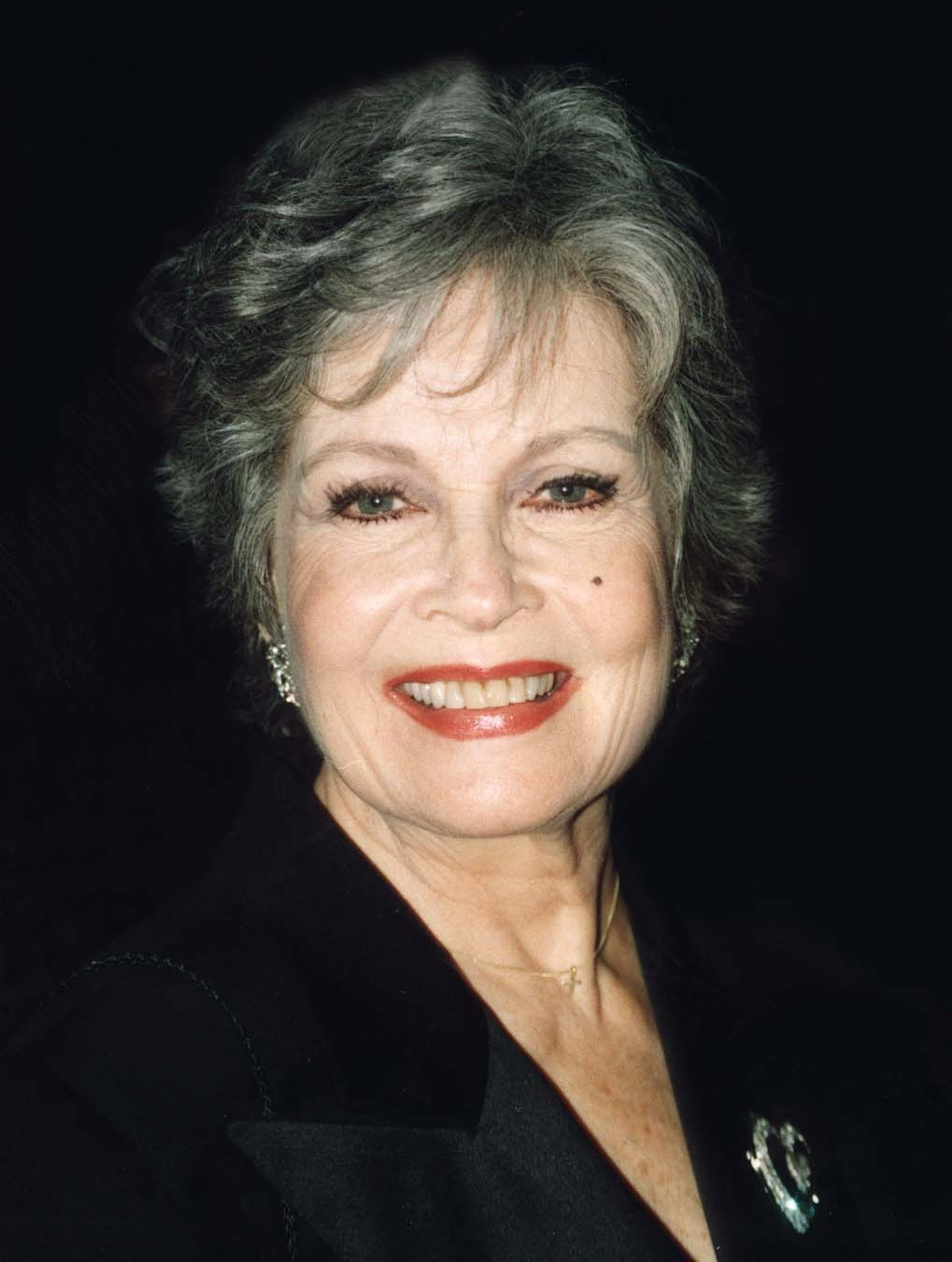
DeHaven in 1998

DeHaven married four times. Her first husband was actor John Payne, star of The Restless Gun, whom she married in 1944 and divorced in 1950. Her second husband was real estate developer Martin Kimmel. They were married in 1953 and divorced the following year. She was married to Richard Fincher, member of the Florida House of Representatives and a Miami Oldsmobile dealer, from 1957 until 1963. They remarried in 1965 and divorced again in 1969.

She had two children with Payne, daughter Kathleen Hope (born 1945) and son Thomas John (born 1947), as well as two children with Fincher, son Harry (born 1958) and daughter Faith (born 1962).

In 1960, DeHaven received a star on the Hollywood Walk of Fame at 6933 Hollywood Blvd.

DeHaven was a staunch Republican and, in later years, attributed her youthful appearance to an organic diet and faith in prayer.

== Death ==
DeHaven died in Las Vegas on July 30, 2016, aged 91, of undisclosed causes while in hospice care after suffering a stroke a few months earlier. She was survived by her four children.

== Filmography ==
=== Films ===
Year	Title	Role	Notes
1936	Modern Times	Gamin's sister	Uncredited
1940	Susan and God	Enid	
1940	Keeping Company	Evelyn Thomas	
1941	The Penalty	Anne Logan	
1941	Two-Faced Woman	Debutante in ladies' room	Uncredited
1943	Best Foot Forward	Minerva	
1943	Thousands Cheer	Herself	
1944	Broadway Rhythm	Patsy Demming	
1944	Two Girls and a Sailor	Jean Deyo	
1944	Step Lively	Christine Marlowe	
1944	The Thin Man Goes Home	Laurabelle Ronson	
1945	Between Two Women	Edna	
1948	Summer Holiday	Muriel McComber	
1949	Scene of the Crime	Lili	
1949	Yes Sir That's My Baby	Sarah Jane Winfield	
1949	The Doctor and the Girl	Fabienne Corday	
1950	The Yellow Cab Man	Ellen Goodrich	
1950	Three Little Words	Mrs. Carter De Haven	
1950	Summer Stock	Abigail Falbury	
1950	I'll Get By	Terry Martin	
1951	Two Tickets to Broadway	Hannah Holbrook	
1953	Down Among the Sheltering Palms	Angela Toland	
1954	So This Is Paris	Colette d'Avril	
1955	The Girl Rush	Taffy Tremaine	
1976	Banjo Hackett: Roamin’ Free	Lady Jane Gray	TV movie
1976	Won Ton Ton, the Dog Who Saved Hollywood	President's girl 1	
1978	Evening in Byzantium	Sonia Murphy	TV movie
1979	Bog	Ginny Glenn	
1984	Off Sides (Pigs vs. Freaks)	Maureen Brockmeyer	TV movie
1990	Ladies on Sweet Street	Ruth	
1994	Outlaws: The Legend of O.B. Taggart		
1997	Out to Sea	Vivian	

=== Television ===
Year	Title	Role	Notes
1951	The Alan Young Show		
1956	The George Gobel Show		December 8 episode
1959	The Further Adventures of Ellery Queen		1 episode
1959	The Rifleman	Lillian Halstead	Season 2, episode 6: "Eddie's Daughter"
1959	Johnny Ringo	Ronna Desmond	1 episode
1960	Wagon Train	Allison Justis	1 episode
1961	BBC Sunday-Night Play	Shirley Kellogg	1 episode
1961	The Defenders	Agnes A	Season 1, episode 15: "Gideon's Follies"
1967	Mannix	Gloria Newman	Season 1, episode 3: "Nothing Ever Works Twice"
1972	The Jimmy Stewart Show	Lucy Carruthers	Season 1, episode 23: 'Old School Ties"
1974	Gunsmoke	Carrie	1 episode
1974	Nakia	Irene James	13 episodes
1975	Match Game	Herself	1975 for one week
1975	Movin' On	Janey	1 episode
1977	Quincy, M.E.	Doreen	1 episode
1976–1977	Mary Hartman, Mary Hartman	Annie Wylie	30 episodes
1978	The Ted Knight Show	Delores	1 episode
1978	Police Story	Jill's Mother	1 episode
1978	The Eddie Capra Mysteries	Gail Cormac	1 episode
1979	Delta House	Marion Wormer	2 episodes
1980	B. J. and the Bear	Mama	1 episode
1980	Hello, Larry		1 episode
1981	Darkroom	Louise Lawrence	1 episode
1978–1982	Fantasy Island	Sophie / Mrs. Brennan	2 episodes
1982	Hart to Hart	Reva	1 episode
1983	Falcon Crest	Gloria Marlowe	1 episode
1983	Mama's Family	Sally Nash	Episode: "Positive Thinking"
1983–1985	Ryan's Hope	Bess Shelby	14 episodes
1983–1986	The Love Boat	Mary Halbert / Florence Dolan	2 episodes
1987	Highway to Heaven	Phoebe Hall	Season 3, episode 18: "A Mother and Daughter"
1987–1989	Murder, She Wrote	Phyllis Grant	3 episodes
1993	All My Children	Emma Mallory	
2000	Touched by an Angel	Beverly	1 episode

== Stage work ==
- Seventh Heaven (1955)
- The Unsinkable Molly Brown (1963)
- The Sound of Music (1964)
- Golden Boy (1968)
- Plaza Suite (1971)
- Hello, Dolly (1973)
- No, No, Nanette (1983)
- A High-Time Salute to Martin and Blane (1991) (benefit concert)

== Radio appearances ==
Year	Program	Episode/source
1952	Broadway Playhouse	Practically Yours
1953	Theatre Guild on the Air	O'Halloran's Luck''
