= Dangerous to Men =

1920 film by William C. Dowlan

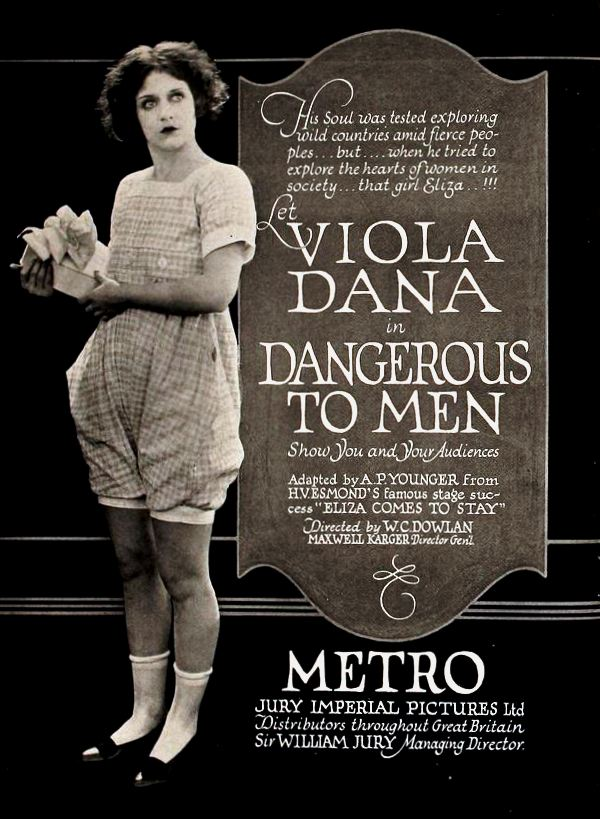
- Advertisement
- Directed by: William C. Dowlan
- Written by: Andrew Percival Younger
- Based on: Eliza Comes to Stay by Henry V. Esmond
- Produced by: Maxwell Karger
- Starring: Viola Dana
- Cinematography: John Arnold
- Production companies: Screen Classics, Inc.
- Distributed by: Metro Pictures
- Release date: April 1920
- Running time: 6 reels
- Country: United States
- Language: Silent (English intertitles)

Dangerous to Men is a lost 1920 American silent comedy film directed by William C. Dowlan and starring Viola Dana. It was distributed through Metro Pictures. The working title was "Eliza Comes to Stay".

== Cast ==
- Viola Dana as Elisa
- Milton Sills as Sandy Verrall
- Edward Connelly as Prof. John Vandam
- Josephine Crowell as Henrietta
- Marian Skinner as Miss Bird
- John P. Morse as Tommy
- James O. Barrows as Uncle Gregory
- Mollie McConnell as Aunt Ellen
- Helen Raymond as Vera Raymond
- Mary Beaton
- Esther Ralston
- Doris Baker (uncredited)
