= Whitford Hall =

Historic house in Pennsylvania, United States

- U.S. National Register of Historic Places
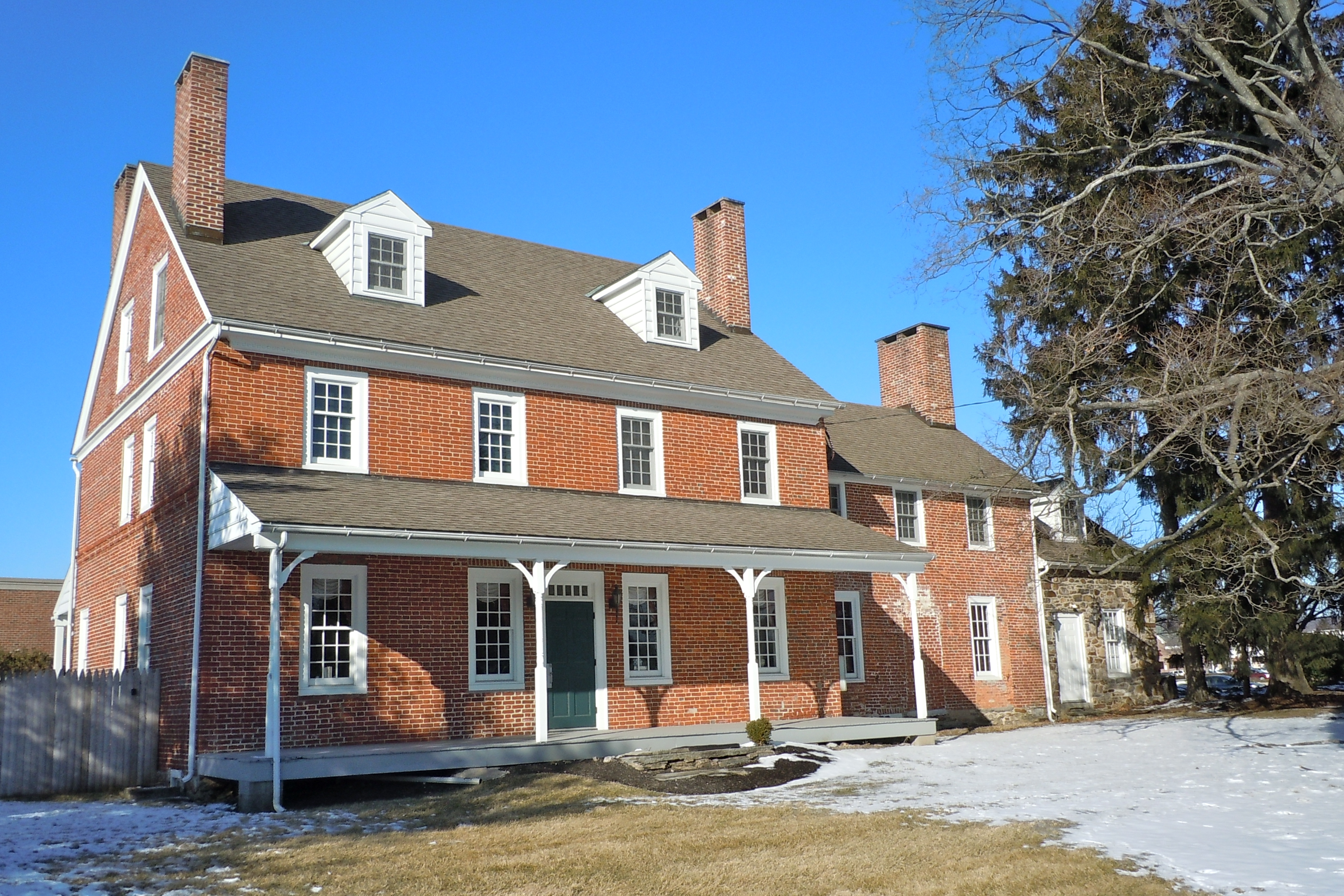
- Whitford Hall, January 2011

- Location within Pennsylvania Location within the United States
- Location: 145 W. Lincoln Hwy., West Whiteland Township, Pennsylvania
- Coordinates: 40°1′39″N 75°37′58″W
- Area: 1.7 acres (0.69 ha)
- Built: c. 1796
- Built by: Thomas, Richard
- Architectural style: Federal
- MPS: West Whiteland Township MRA
- NRHP reference No.: 84003319
- Added to NRHP: September 6, 1984

Whitford Hall is a historic home located in West Whiteland Township, Chester County, Pennsylvania. Built about 1796 by Richard Thomas, the house is a 2 1/2-story, five-bay brick dwelling in the Federal style. It has a gable roof with dormers, service wing, and frame additions. Also on the property are a stone shed, tenant house, and carriage house. It is one of three surviving historic residences constructed by Richard Thomas, the others being Whitford Lodge and Ivy Cottage.

Whitford Hall was listed on the National Register of Historic Places in 1984.
