= Ray Cox (performer) =

American actress

Ray Cox (Ray Cox Flint)
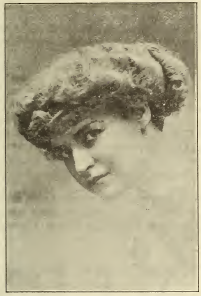
- Ray Cox circa 1909
- Born: September 18, 1881; Baton Rouge, Louisiana, U.S.
- Died: November 7, 1957 (aged 76); Providence, Rhode Island, U.S.
- Occupation(s): Actress, comedian
- Spouse(s): Henry Cox Fishel (divorced 1916); Harvey J. Flint (1917-1957; her death)

Ray Cox (September 18, 1881 - November 7, 1957) was an early 20th century American actress and vaudeville performer.

Cox was born in Baton Rouge, Louisiana, attended South Division High School in Chicago, and went to Vassar College. Vaudeville performer Mabel Hite encouraged her stage aspirations, and Cox first appeared on stage in Peoria, Illinois in 1903.

Cox performing a baseball skit, circa 1909

She debuted in New York at Tony Pastor's Theatre on October 25, 1903. She became a headliner in vaudeville, with one popular sketch portraying an athletic girl at a baseball game, and which was made into an audio recording by Edison.

She was often billed as the "Southern girl" or "girl from Dixie". Her play roles including the part of Signora Monti in the popular 1914 play Twin Beds. She also appeared in Lew Fields's The Never Homes (1911), and The Charity Girl (1912).

== Personal life ==
Cox's first husband was Henry Cox Fishel, whom she divorced for desertion in 1916. She married Harvey J. Flint, a manager at Goldwyn Pictures, in September 1917. Thereafter known as Ray Cox Flint, she died in Providence, Rhode Island on November 7, 1957, and was buried at Swan Point Cemetery.

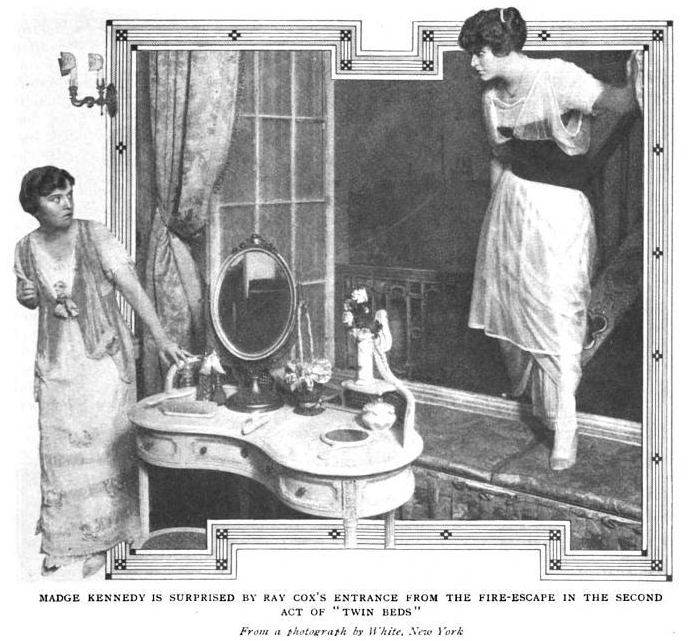
Madge Kennedy (left) and Cox in 1914 play, Twin Beds
