= Helen Raymond =

American actress (1878–1965)

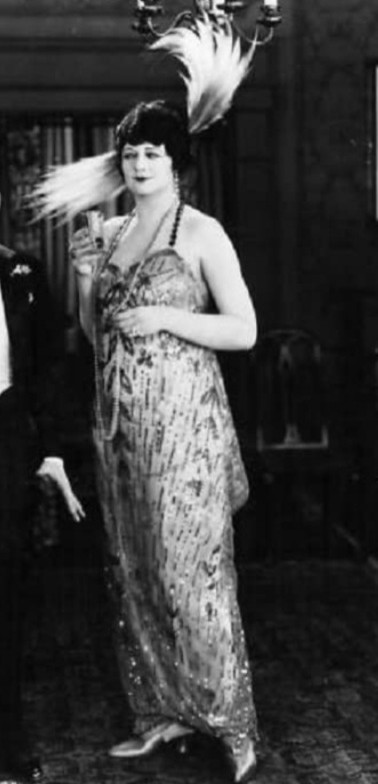
- Raymond in Twin Beds (1920)
- Born: September 3, 1878; Philadelphia, Pennsylvania, U.S.
- Died: November 26, 1965 (aged 87); New York City, U.S.
- Education: Philadelphia Conservatory of Music
- Occupation: Actress
- Years active: 1915–1955
- Spouse: Ira John Perry (m. 1914)

Helen Raymond (September 3, 1878 – November 26, 1965) was an American stage actress who did comedy roles on Broadway, and also appeared in Hollywood motion pictures and in vaudeville.

== Early years ==
Raymond was born September 3, 1878, in Philadelphia, Pennsylvania, and graduated from the Philadelphia Conservatory of Music with an emphasis in piano.

== Career ==
Raymond performed in vaudeville in addition to her other work on stage. One of her early theatrical roles was Mrs. Eichorn in Mrs. Wiggs of the Cabbage Patch in a New York production and in a touring troupe in Australia and in the United States.

Her Broadway debut came in 1915 in Very Good Eddie.

Raymond's success in the Broadway production of Twin Beds resulted in her going to London to perform in that show for three seasons. Presenting the play in England required a change of title, however. to Be Careful, Baby, which Raymond said "had no connection with the plot at all".

In 1931, Raymond starred in Stepping Sisters in Philadelphia. The play, in which Raymond portrayed a burlesque queen, ran for seven months in Chicago and for 10 months in New York. In June 1941, Raymond called that role her "greatest personal success" up to that time.

Raymond portrayed Mrs. Wadsworth T. Harcourt in a 64-week run of Anything Goes (1934) and One Touch of Venus (1943). Her final appearance in a Broadway production was as Eulalie Mackecknie Shinn in The Music Man, from 1957-1960.

She performed for at least eight seasons with the St. Louis, Missouri, Municipal Opera, and she acted with the Los Angeles Civic Light Opera at the Jones Beach Marine Theater.

In the summer of 1942, Helen created the role of the Wicked Witch of the West, at The Municipal Opera Association of St. Louis, in the first stage production of The Wizard of Oz to use the songs from the 1939 MGM film.

Working for Realart Pictures Inc., Raymond made her first motion picture in 1920, the feature, Dangerous to Men. She next starred as Mary Pickford's maid in Through the Back Door (1921). Raymond acted in at least seven films all together, the final one being The Huntress (1923). She appeared in an episode of the TV series Producers Showcase in 1955, entitled The Women.

== Personal life ==
On November 19, 1914, Raymond married Ira John Perry, a "wealthy St. Louisan", in Baltimore, Maryland. The couple lived in St. Louis until she left in January 1915 to resume her career. She went to New York and starred in Twin Beds. He sued for divorce on July 5, 1916, on grounds of desertion. He specified in the complaint, "She told me that she regretted the marriage and that she preferred a stage life to that of the home."

== Death ==
On November 26, 1965, Raymond died at the Lynwood Nursing Home in New York City, aged 87. She had previously lived at 610 Cathedral Parkway.
