= Polly of the Circus (1907 play) =

Play about a circus performer falling in love with the local pastor

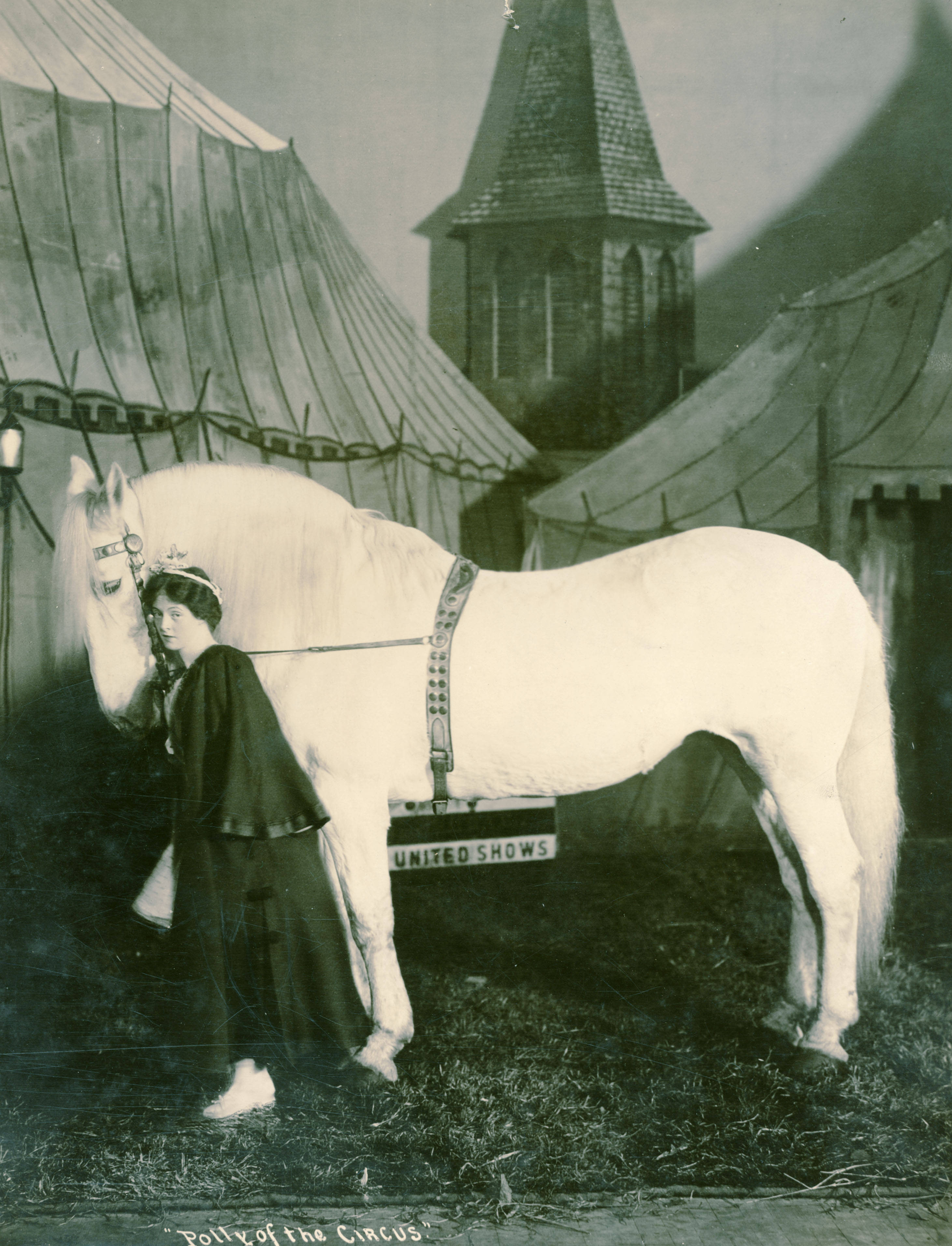
- Mabel Taliaferro in the play (publicity photo)
- Written by: Margaret Mayo
- Original language: English
- Subject: After a circus performer is injured, she falls in love with the local pastor
- Genre: drama
- Setting: In a small mid-western town at a parsonage and a circus

Premiere
- Date premiered: December 23, 1907
- Place premiered: Liberty Theatre

Polly of the Circus was a 1907 Broadway play by Margaret Mayo which starred Mabel Taliaferro and was produced by Taliaferro's husband, Frederic Thompson. A circus girl/minister love story known for its drama and its spectacle staging, the cast also included Edith Taliaferro, Herbert Ayling, Joseph Brennan, Mattie Ferguson, John Findlay, Guy Nichols, Ida St. Leon and Malcolm Williams.

== Plot ==
Polly, a star bareback rider in a circus, is injured during a performance. The circus leaves town and she is left behind to convalescence at a local minister's house. During her 11-month stay they fall in love but the disapproval of the town folk causes Polly to rejoin the circus. A month later the circus comes back to town and the minister goes to it in search of Polly. This third act of the play recreates an actual circus on stage, complete with animals, during which the lovers reunite. The final star lit tableau scene has the lovers together watching lights of the circus wagons as they disappear over the hills.

== Settings ==
Action takes place in a small mid-western town.

Act I

- Scene 1: The minister's study at night
- Scene 2: A bedroom above the study the next morning

Act II

- Rear garden of parsonage eleven months later

Act II

- Scene 1: Behind the scenes at the circus tent.
- Scene 2: During the circus
- Scene 3: At night in an empty circus lot

== Production ==
Margaret Mayo wrote Polly of the Circus as a novel and adapted it into three act play (her first) for the stage. It was brought to the stage by amusement entrepreneur and showman Frederic Thompson, who previously had been the creator of many world's fair attractions as well as Coney Island's Luna Park and the New York Hippodrome. Thompson had married stage actress Mabel Taliaferro the previous year and produced Polly of the Circus as star vehicle for her. The sets and elaborate spectacles seen on stage were designed by Thompson and built at his Luna Park workshops.

== In performance ==
The play opened in New York on December 23, 1907, at the Liberty Theatre at 242 West 42nd Street and was a success, running for 160 performances until May 1908. After that it went on the road and was duplicated into several productions. During its run "Polly" was not only played by Mabel Taliaferro, but also by her sister Edith Taliaferro, and by Fay Wallace.

== Film adaptations ==
In 1917 silent film version of Polly of the Circus was produced by Samuel Goldwyn starring Mae Marsh. Marion Davies and Clark Gable starred in a 1932 version of Polly of the Circus directed by Alfred Santell for MGM.
