= Reese Samuel Thomas =

American politician (1918–2011)

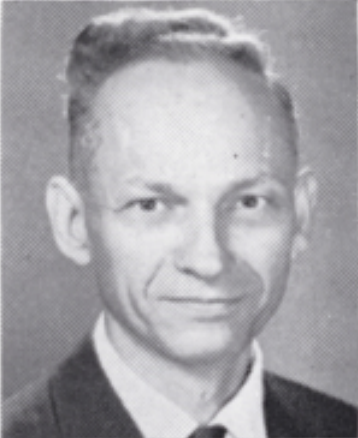

Member of the Georgia Senate from the 54th district
- In office 1963–1965
- Preceded by: Charles A. Pannell
- Succeeded by: W. W. Fincher Jr.

Personal details
- Born: June 3, 1918 Dalton, Georgia, U.S.
- Died: July 14, 2011 (aged 93)
- Party: Republican
- Spouse: Margaret Strickland (m. 1941)
- Children: 3

Reese Samuel Thomas (June 3, 1918 – July 14, 2011), also known as R. S. Thomas, was an American politician from Georgia. He served in the Georgia State Senate as a Republican from 1963 to 1965.

== Early life ==
Thomas was born on June 3, 1918, in Dalton, Georgia, to Sam W. Thomas and Ellen (Patterson) Thomas. He graduated from Pleasant Grove High School in 1935.

== Political career ==
Thomas was elected in a special election following the vacancy of the previous senator, Charles A. Pannell. He won the special election, 3,275 to 2,348 votes, defeating James H. Phillips. He was defeated for reelection in 1964, losing to W. W. Fincher Jr.

== Personal life ==
Thomas married his wife, Margaret Strickland, on August 31, 1941. Together they had three children. He died on July 14, 2011, aged 93.
