= Polly of the Circus (1917 film) =

1917 film

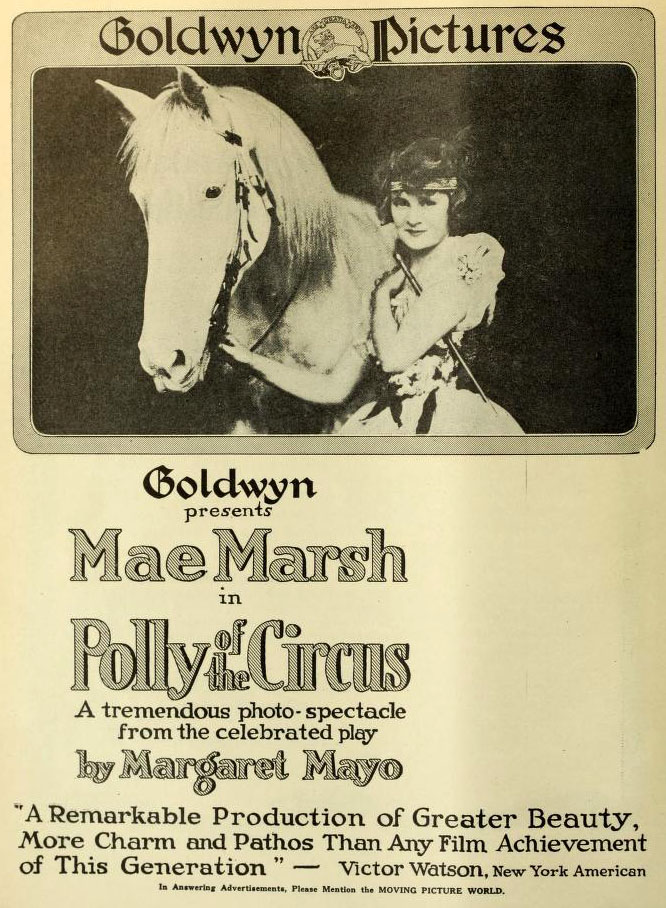
- Advertisement poster-print
- Directed by: Charles T. Horan; Edwin L. Hollywood
- Written by: Adrian Gil-Spear (scenario); Emmett C. Hall (scenario)
- Based on: Polly of the Circus; 1907 play by Margaret Mayo
- Produced by: Samuel Goldwyn
- Starring: Mae Marsh
- Cinematography: George W. Hill
- Distributed by: Goldwyn Pictures
- Release date: September 16, 1917
- Running time: 8 reels (80 mins.)
- Country: United States
- Language: Silent (English intertitles)

Polly of the Circus is a 1917 American 8-reel silent drama film notable as the first film produced by Samuel Goldwyn after founding his studio Goldwyn Pictures. This film starred Mae Marsh, usually an actress for D.W. Griffith, but now under contract to Goldwyn for a series of films. The film was based on the 1907 Broadway play Polly of the Circus by Margaret Mayo which starred Mabel Taliaferro. Presumably when MGM remade Polly of the Circus in 1932 with Marion Davies, they still owned the screen rights inherited from the 1924 merger by Marcus Loew of the Metro, Goldwyn, and Louis B. Mayer studios. This film marks the first appearance of Slats, the lion mascot of Goldwyn Pictures and (after the company's 1924 merger) Metro-Goldwyn-Mayer. Prints and/or fragments were found in the Dawson Film Find in 1978.

== Plot ==
As described in a film magazine, the parents of Polly, a little horseback rider, are dead, and circus performers Jim and Toby are her sponsors. One night while performing Polly is thrown from her horse and injured. She is taken to the home of parson John Douglas, and the circus is forced to leave without her. The parson finds in Polly someone different than anyone in his flock, but his liking for the circus rider does not please the members of the congregation. They force Polly to leave and she reenters the circus, but thoughts of the parson make her unhappy.

After a year's separation, the circus comes to town again. Douglas has not forgotten his little circus performer, and one night he goes to the tent to visit her. She tries to send him away, but he will not go. The circus tents catch fire, and in the general confusion and wreckage, Douglas and Jim bring Polly to safety. In the arms of the parson, Polly bids her circus friends goodbye.

== Credited Cast ==
- Stephen Carr as Little Johnnie Douglas
- John Carr as Little Jim Handy
- Harry LaPearl as Toby (credited as Harry La Pearl)
- George S. Trimble as P.T. Barker (credited as George Trimble)
- Charles Riegel as Deacon Strong
- Mildred Call as Little Polly
- Lillian Ward as Mlle. Nanette
- Vernon Steele as Rev. John Douglas
- Lucille La Verne as Mandy
- Dick Lee as Hasty (credited as Richard Lee)
- Mae Marsh as Mlle. Polly
- Wellington A. Playter as Jim Handy (credited as Wellington Playter)

== Production ==
Most of the film was shot at Goldwyn's studios in Fort Lee but some scenes were shot on location in New Jersey including scenes of the horse race in Ho-Ho-Kus, a circus parade in Englewood and the arrival of the circus in Coytesville.

== Preservation ==
The film was once thought to be lost, the last copy destroyed in the 1965 MGM vault fire. However, a copy of it was found amid a collection of silent films buried in permafrost in Dawson City, Yukon, in 1978. The print is now part of the Library of Congress and Archives Canada, Dawson City Collection. The film is available commercially in DVD format and can easily be found online thanks to its public domain status.
