= Whitford Lodge =

Historic building in Pennsylvania, United States

Coordinates: 40.027402°N 75.633921°W

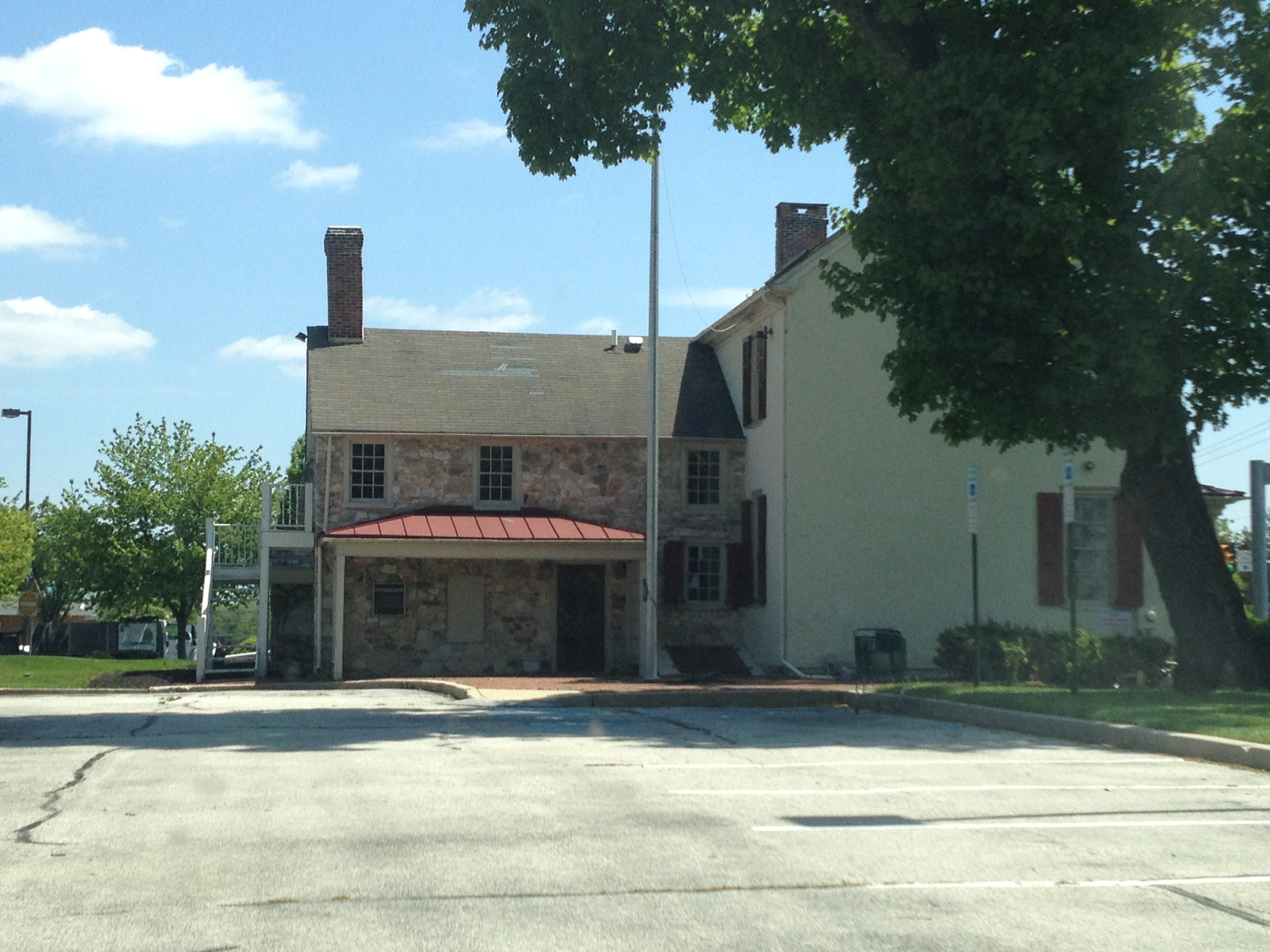
Whitford Lodge Building in 2013

The Whitford Lodge is a historic building located in Exton in West Whiteland Township, Pennsylvania, in the Philadelphia metropolitan area. Politician and soldier Richard Thomas constructed the lodge in 1782. It is one of three surviving historic residences constructed by Thomas in West Whiteland Township, the others being Whitford Hall and Ivy Cottage.

It is in the Whiteland Towne Center where it was once an old inn that once sat next to the Exton Diner at the site of the Exton Drive In Theater. It once housed a branch of the Hudson United Bank which became TD Bank. According to another source, the building was built in 1788 where travelers would read a sign that said "Whitford Lodge - Team Room." The lodge was originally built along a rural stretch of U.S. Route 30 (now U.S. Route 30 Business), also known as the Lincoln Highway.
