= Ivy Cottage (West Whiteland Township, Pennsylvania) =

Historic house in Pennsylvania, United States

- U.S. National Register of Historic Places
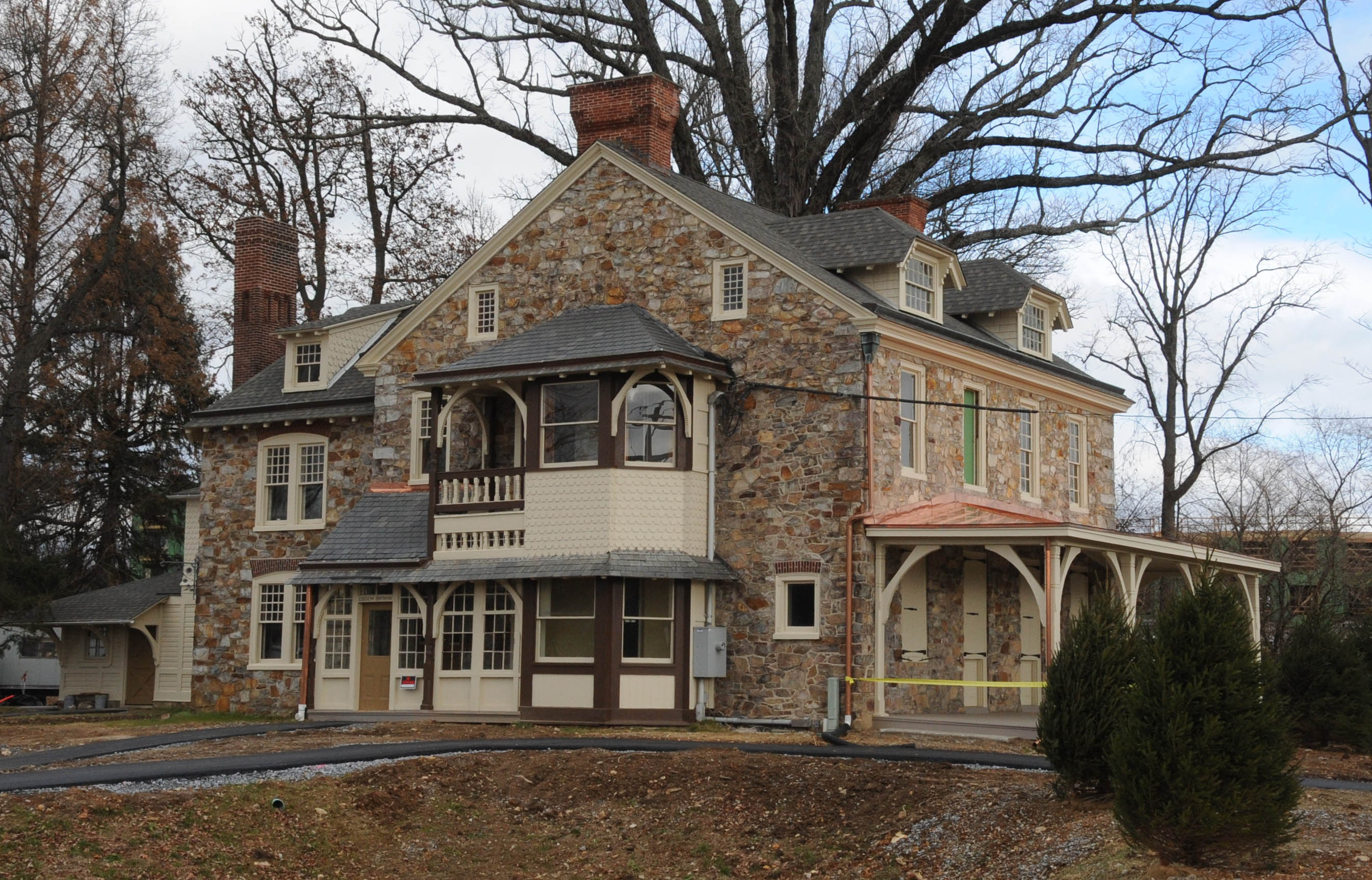

- Location within Pennsylvania Location within the United States
- Location: 225 W. Lincoln Highway; Exton, PA 19341
- Coordinates: 40°01′39″N 75°38′02″W
- Area: 2.4 acres (0.97 ha)
- Built: 1799
- Architect: Richard Thomas
- Architectural style: Georgian, Queen Anne
- NRHP reference No.: 84003961
- Added to NRHP: November 9, 2018

Ivy Cottage is a historic residence located in Exton, a census-designated place in West Whiteland Township, Chester County, Pennsylvania. Built in 1799 by politician and soldier Richard Thomas, the cottage started out as a plain stone farmhouse in the double-door Georgian style. It underwent extensive renovations and embellishments in the Queen Anne style in 1881 followed by an award-winning restoration in 2019. It was listed on the National Register of Historic Places on November 9, 2018.

== History ==
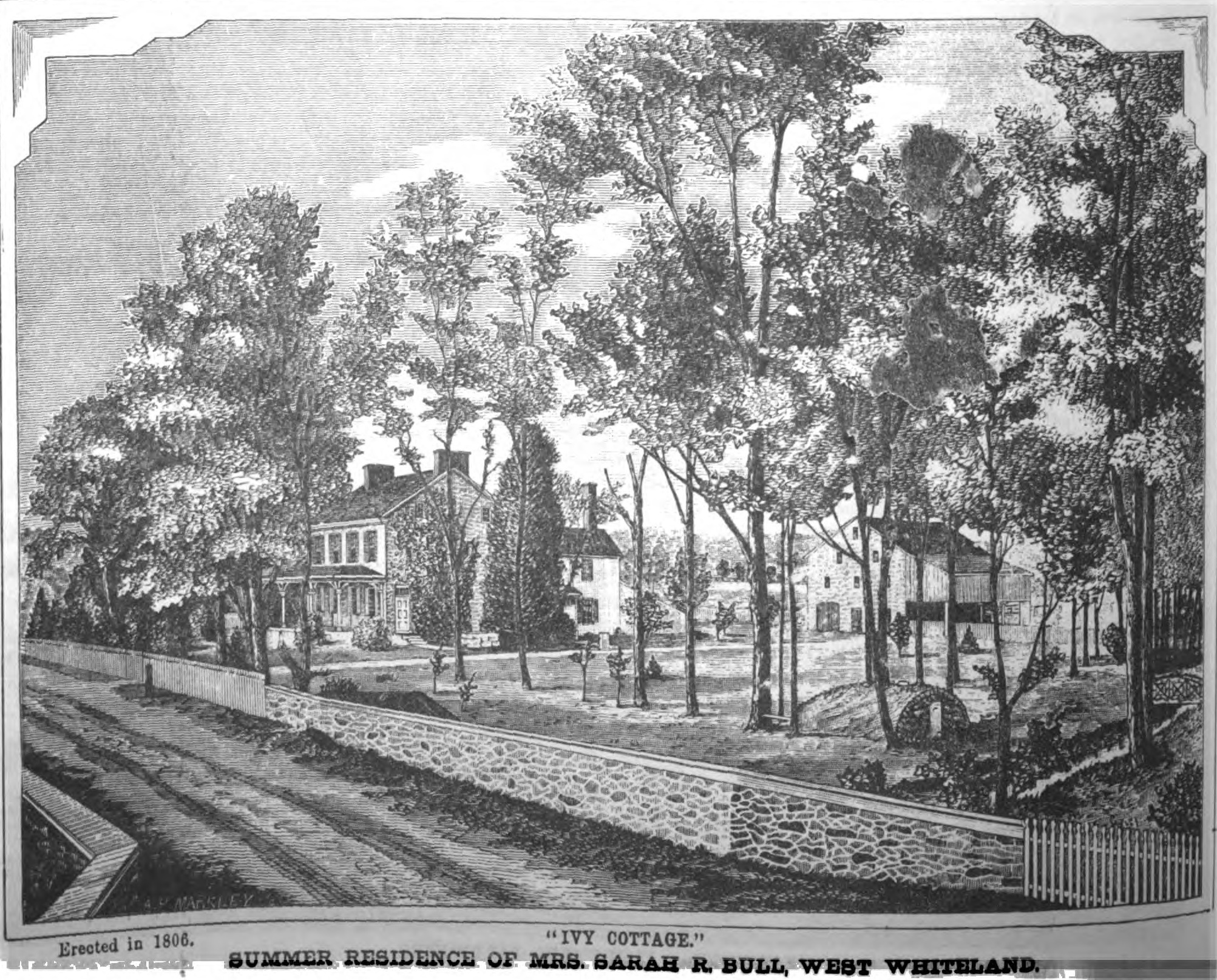
Ivy Cottage circa 1881

Ivy Cottage was the finale of a building program by Richard Thomas, a prosperous Quaker farmer who served as a colonel of the Pennsylvania militia during the American Revolutionary War and went on to serve in the United States Congress. Thomas erected Whitford Lodge, a two-story brick manor house, circa 1782, followed by Whitford Hall circa 1796 and Ivy Cottage in 1799. The cottage was reportedly intended as a summer home for two unmarried women relatives of Colonel Thomas.

The property descended to Sarah Roberts Thomas (1823–1897), who lived in Philadelphia and summered at Ivy Cottage with her husband, William M. Bull (1820–1883). She oversaw an extensive renovation of the cottage in 1881, adding architectural flourishes as well as extensions and a porch. Ivy Cottage passed to Sarah's son, Episcopalian minister William Levi Bull, on her death. After Bull died in 1932, the cottage passed to his stepson, attorney and soldier George C. Chandler. Sarah's was the last major renovation until 2019—the house changed little in the ensuing century and stayed in the Thomas family.

In 2019, the Hankin Group, a local property developer, restored and converted Ivy Cottage into a pair of apartments, renaming the residence the Chandler House in honor of its previous owners, George G. and Ann Howell Chandler, who were descended from Colonel Thomas. The developer received the 2019 West Whiteland Township Historic Preservation Award.

Ivy Cottage was listed on the National Register of Historic Places on November 9, 2018.

== Description ==
Ivy Cottage was constructed in 1799 as a plain Quaker farmhouse in the double-door Georgian manner, a vernacular style widely used in Chester County at the time but relatively unusual in West Whiteland Township. The building's core is rectangular, two-storied, double-piled, and gable-roofed with a box cornice and brick chimneys. The facade, facing south toward the Philadelphia and Lancaster Turnpike, is evenly divided into four bays and features double balanced entrances. Each of the four first-floor rooms contains a fireplace. A full basement lies beneath the house. A two-story wooden kitchen wing extends off the north wall.

Bull's 1881 renovation incorporated corbelled chimneys, elaborate mantles, slate roofing, a large porch on the western wall, and an enlarged service wing faced with stone and featuring picturesque dormer windows. Her highest-profile addition was a two-story pentagonal room known to the family as "La Sata" and featuring 16/1 windows with brick arches, shed dormers, and an exposed ground-to-roof brick chimney, in quintessential Queen Anne style.

== See also ==
- National Register of Historic Places listings in eastern Chester County, Pennsylvania
