= Brownsville, White County, Illinois =

Brownsville, Illinois
- Unincorporated community
- Location within Illinois Location within the United States
- Coordinates: 38°02′29″N 88°14′41″W
- Country: United States
- State: Illinois
- County: White
- Elevation: 413 ft (126 m)
- Time zone: UTC-6 (Central (CST))
  - Summer (DST): UTC-5 (CDT)
- Area code: 618
- GNIS feature ID: 404989

Brownsville is an unincorporated community in White County, Illinois, United States.

== Notable people ==
- King Brockett, baseball player, was born in Brownsville.
- Margaret Mayo, playwright, was born in Brownsville.
