= Carter DeHaven =

American actor, director and writer (1886–1977)

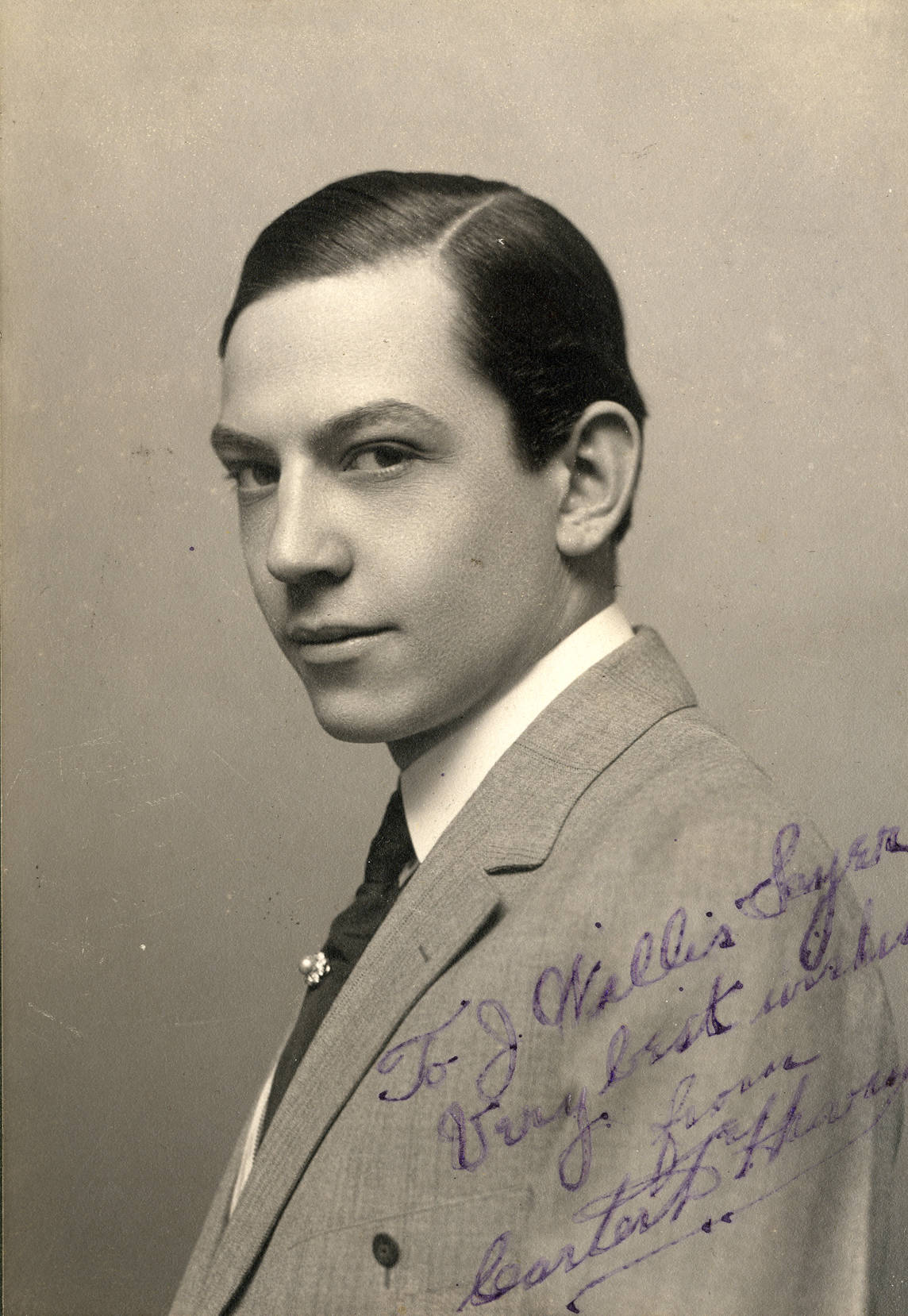
- DeHaven in 1908
- Born: Francis O'Callaghan; October 5, 1886; Chicago, Illinois, U.S.
- Died: July 20, 1977 (aged 90); Los Angeles, California, U.S.
- Resting place: Forest Lawn Memorial Park
- Occupations: Actor; director; screenwriter
- Years active: 1903–1965
- Spouses: Flora Parker DeHaven (m. 1905; div. 1928) Evelyn Burd (m. 1929; div. 1940)
- Children: 2, including Gloria DeHaven

Carter DeHaven (born Francis O'Callaghan; October 5, 1886 – July 20, 1977) was an American film and stage actor, film director, and screenwriter.

== Career ==
DeHaven started his career in vaudeville in 1896 and made his Broadway debut portraying multiple roles in the 1903 musical Whoop-Dee-Doo. Other Broadway musicals he starred in included Miss Dolly Dollars (1905), The Queen of the Moulin Rouge (1908), Hanky Panky (1912), All Aboard (1913), and His Little Widows (1917). He also directed and starred as Bertie Stewart in the 1910 Broadway play The Girl in the Taxi by playwright Stanislaus Stange.

DeHaven started acting in movies in 1915. He regularly starred in comedy shorts up until 1923. He worked for Paramount in 1920, and some of his films were directed by Charley Chase.

A 1923 short titled Character Studies uses editing as DeHaven "transforms" himself into the spitting image of various major film stars of the era: Buster Keaton, Harold Lloyd, Douglas Fairbanks, Roscoe "Fatty" Arbuckle and 9-year-old Jackie Coogan. This was the only film in which Keaton and Lloyd appeared together and also marked Keaton's last film appearance with Arbuckle, his former partner.

DeHaven went on to work with Charlie Chaplin as assistant director on Modern Times (1936) and assistant producer for The Great Dictator (1940). In the latter film, he also played the Bacterian Ambassador. In the 1959–60 season, he appeared four times in various roles, and his daughter Gloria once as Rosemary Blaker, in the episode "Love Affair" on the television series Johnny Ringo. At this time he also guest-starred on The Donna Reed Show in the role of Fred Miller in "It Only Hurts When I Laugh".

In 1965, DeHaven played an old man, Henry, walking with his wife in a park in the Bewitched episode "Eye of the Beholder".

== Personal life and death ==
He was married to actress Flora Parker. They would often be paired together in films, including The College Orphan (1915) and Twin Beds (1920). Their daughter, actress Gloria DeHaven, made her first screen appearance in Modern Times. Their son, Carter DeHaven Jr., was also an actor and director. Carter Jr was born December 23, 1910, in New York City, and died March 1, 1979, in Encino, California. Both Carter and Gloria DeHaven have their own stars on the Hollywood Walk of Fame. After their divorce, Carter DeHaven married Evelyn Burd (a union that also ended in divorce).

Carter DeHaven died in 1977 at age 90 and was interred at Forest Lawn Memorial Park Cemetery, Glendale, California

== Filmography ==
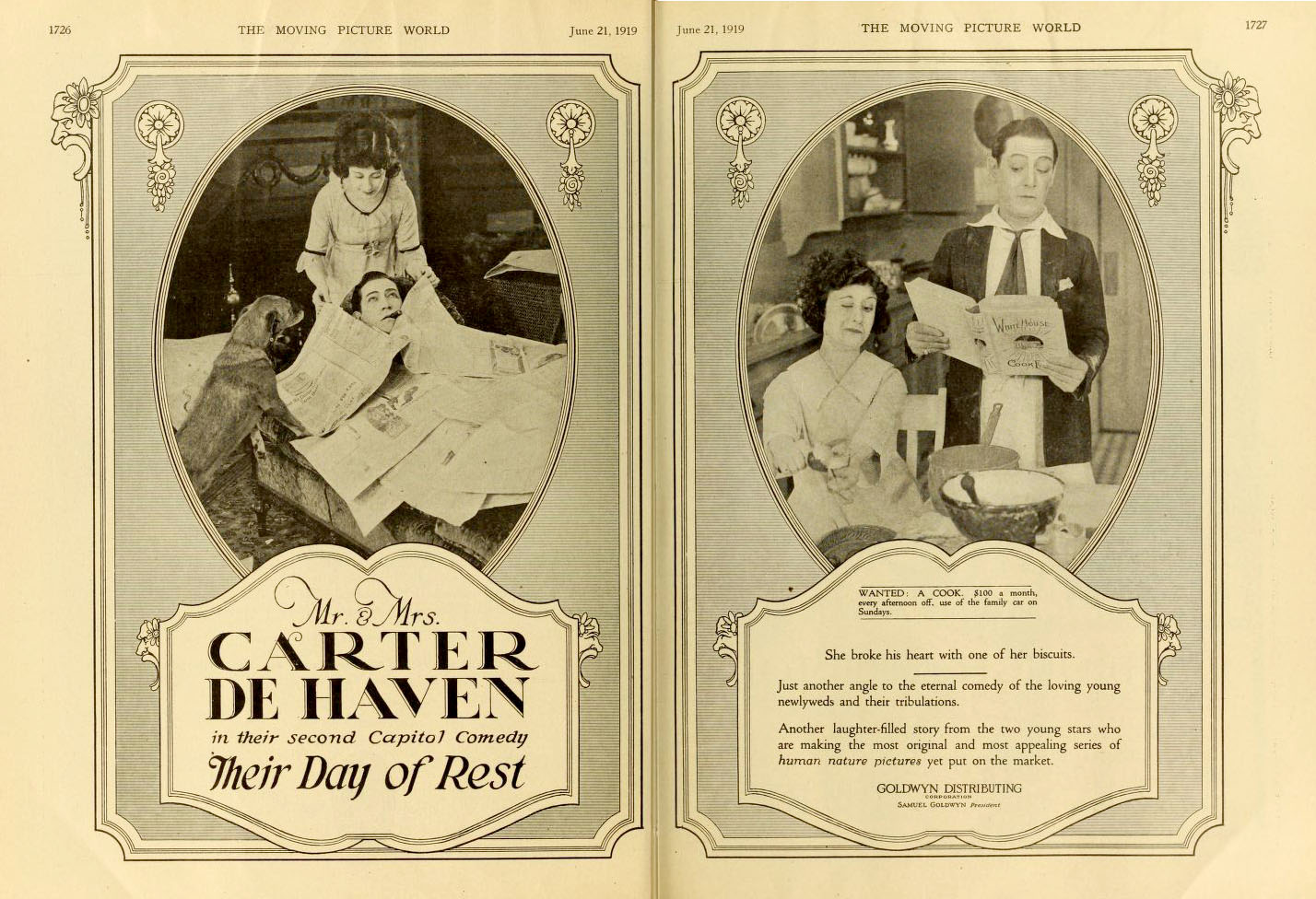
Carter and Flora Parker DeHaven in an advertisement for their film Their Day of Rest (1919)

| Year | Title | Role | Notes |
|---|---|---|---|
| 1915 | The College Orphan | Jack Bennett Jr. | |
| 1916 | The Wrong Door | Philip Borden | |
| 1916 | A Youth of Fortune | Willie O'Donovan | |
| 1916 | From Broadway to a Throne | Jimmie | |
| 1916 | Timothy Dobbs, That's Me | Timothy Dobbs | |
| 1916 | He Becomes a Cop | Timothy Dobbs | Short |
| 1916 | Get the Boy | | |
| 1919 | Their Day of Rest | | Short |
| 1920 | Am I Dreaming? | | |
| 1920 | Twin Beds | Signor Monti | |
| 1921 | The Girl in the Taxi | Bertie Stewart | |
| 1921 | My Lady Friends | James Smith | |
| 1921 | Marry the Poor Girl | Jack Tanner | |
| 1925 | The Thoroughbred | Archie de Rennsaler | |
| 1940 | The Great Dictator | Bacterian Ambassador | |
| 1962 | The Notorious Landlady | Old Man | Uncredited |
