= Dan H. Fincher =

American politician (born 1931)

Member of the Georgia State Senate from the 52nd district
- In office 1979–???

Personal details
- Born: November 8, 1931 (age 94) Floyd County, Georgia, U.S.
- Party: Democratic
- Spouse: Bettye Morgan
- Children: 2

Dan Harold Fincher (born November 8, 1931) is an American politician. He served as a Democratic member for the 52nd district of the Georgia State Senate.

== Life and career ==
Fincher was born in Floyd County, Georgia on November 8, 1931.

In 1979, Fincher was elected to represent the 52nd district of the Georgia State Senate.
