= Richard Thomas (Pennsylvania politician) =

American politician

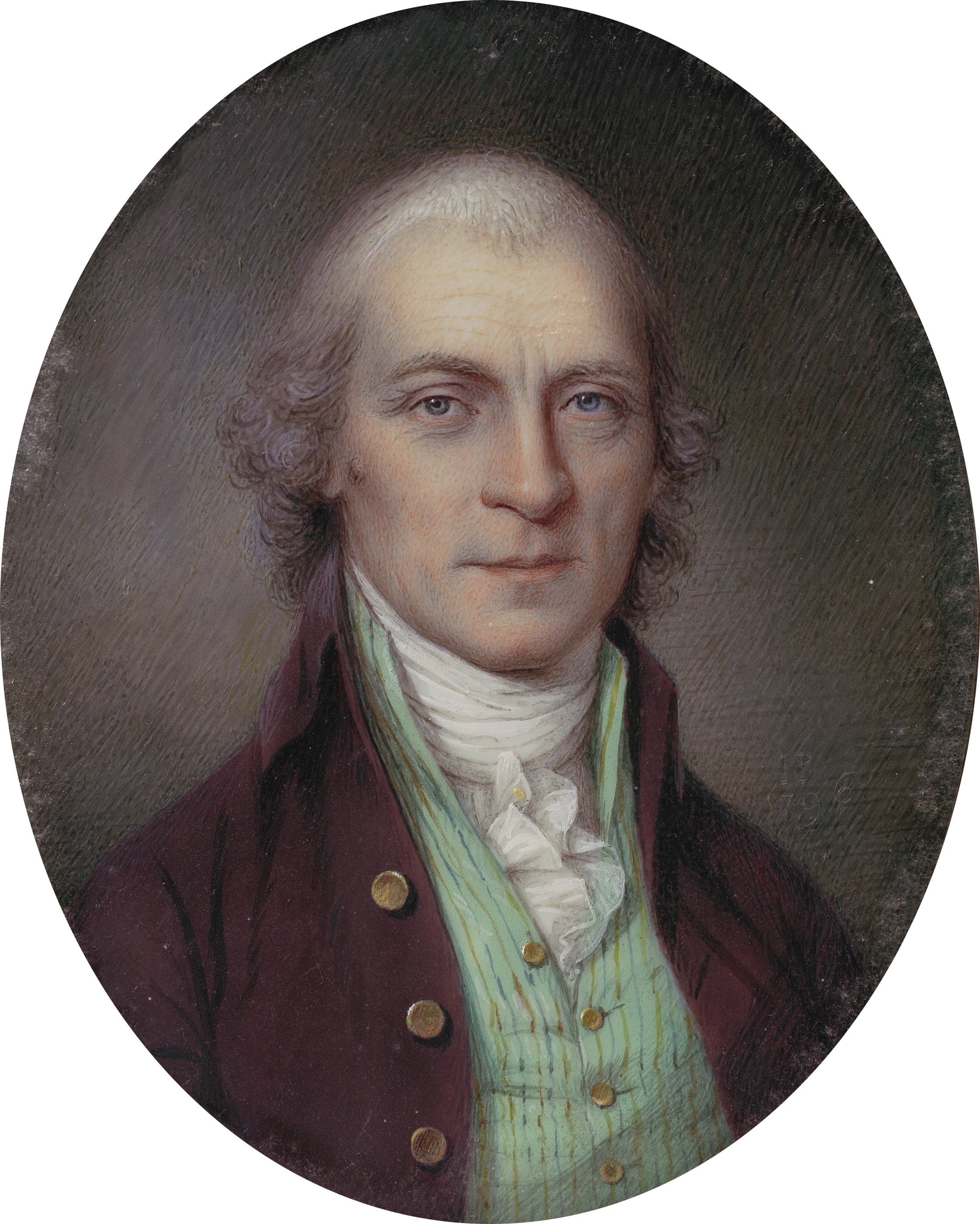

Member of the U.S. House of Representatives from Pennsylvania's 3rd district
- In office March 4, 1795 – March 3, 1801
- Preceded by: see below
- Succeeded by: Joseph Hemphill

Member of the Pennsylvania Senate from the 9th district
- In office 1791–1793
- Preceded by: district created

Personal details
- Born: December 30, 1744 West Whiteland Township, Province of Pennsylvania, British America
- Died: January 19, 1832 (aged 87) Philadelphia, Pennsylvania, U.S.
- Party: Federalist
- Spouse: Thomazine Downing

Richard Thomas (December 30, 1744 – January 19, 1832) was an American politician from Pennsylvania who served as a Federalist member of the United States House of Representatives from Pennsylvania's 3rd congressional district from 1795 to 1801. He also served in the Pennsylvania State Senate for the 9th Senatorial District from 1791 to 1793.

== Early life and education ==
Thomas was born in West Whiteland Township in the Province of Pennsylvania and was educated at home by private teachers. He served in the American Revolutionary War as colonel of the First Regiment, Chester County Volunteers of the Pennsylvania militia. He was of Welsh and English descent.

== Career ==
Thomas became a member of the American Philosophical Society in 1771 and was later elected to the Pennsylvania State Senate for the 9th Senatorial District serving from 1791 to 1793.

In 1793, he was appointed a brigadier-general of militia by Governor Thomas Mifflin but declined to accept the role.

He was elected as a Federalist to the Fourth, Fifth, and Sixth Congresses, serving from March 4, 1795, to March 3, 1801. He engaged in agricultural pursuits and constructed Ivy Cottage, Whitford Lodge, and Whitford Hall in West Whiteland Township.

Thomas died in Philadelphia in 1832 and is buried at the Friends Western Burial Ground in Philadelphia.

== Personal life ==
Thomas married Thomazine Downing, granddaughter of Thomas Downing, founder of Downingtown, Pennsylvania.

U.S. House of Representatives
Preceded by At large on a General ticket: Thomas Fitzsimons, John W. Kittera, Thomas Hartley, Thomas Scott, James Armstrong, Peter G. Muhlenberg, Andrew Gregg, Frederick A.C. Muhlenberg, Daniel Hiester, William Irvine, William Findley, John Smilie, and William Montgomery	Member of the U.S. House of Representatives from Pennsylvania's 3rd congressional district 1795–1801	Succeeded by Joseph Hemphill
Pennsylvania State Senate
Preceded by district created	Member of the Pennsylvania Senate 9th District; 1791-1793	Succeeded by William Ross
