= W. W. Fincher Jr. =

American politician (1914–2008)

Member of the Georgia State Senate from the 54th district
- In office 1965–1991
- Preceded by: Reese Samuel Thomas

Personal details
- Born: May 16, 1914 Cherokee County, Georgia, U.S.
- Died: April 15, 2006 (aged 91)
- Party: Democratic
- Spouse: Eunice Loughridge
- Education: University of South Carolina

W. W. Fincher Jr. (May 16, 1914 – April 15, 2006) was an American politician. He served as a Democratic member for the 54th district of the Georgia State Senate.

== Life and career ==
Fincher was born in Cherokee County, Georgia. He attended Canton High School and the University of South Carolina.

In 1965, Fincher was elected to represent the 54th district of the Georgia State Senate, serving until 1991.

Fincher died in April 2006 at the Hamilton Medical Center, at the age of 91.
