= Dick Fincher =

American politician

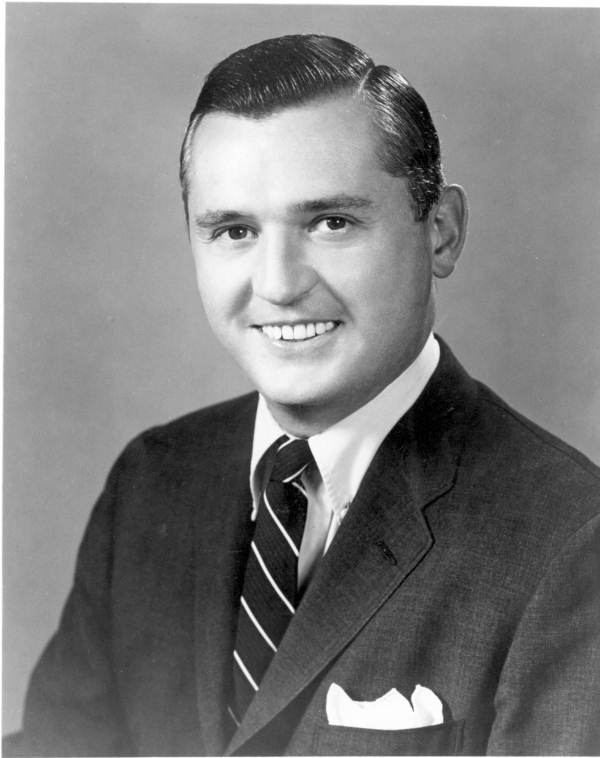
- Fincher in 1966

Member of the Florida House of Representatives from Dade County
- In office 1963–1966

Member of the Florida Senate from the 47th district
- In office 1966–1972
- Preceded by: District established
- Succeeded by: District eliminated

Personal details
- Born: Richard Fincher; September 27, 1927 Rochester, New York, U.S.
- Died: August 10, 2002 (aged 74)
- Party: Democratic
- Spouse(s): Gloria DeHaven (m. 1957; div. 1963) (m. 1965; div. 1969) Jane Fincher
- Children: 2

Richard Fincher (September 27, 1927 – August 10, 2002) was an American politician. He served as a Democratic member of the Florida House of Representatives. He also served as a member for the 47th district of the Florida Senate.

== Life and career ==
Fincher was born in Rochester, New York. He served in the United States Army. He was an automobile dealer.

In 1963, Fincher was elected to the Florida House of Representatives, serving until 1966. In the same year, he was elected to represent the 47th district of the Florida Senate, serving until 1972.

Fincher had two children with actress Gloria DeHaven.

Fincher died in August 2002, at the age of 74.
