= Twin Beds (1914 play) =

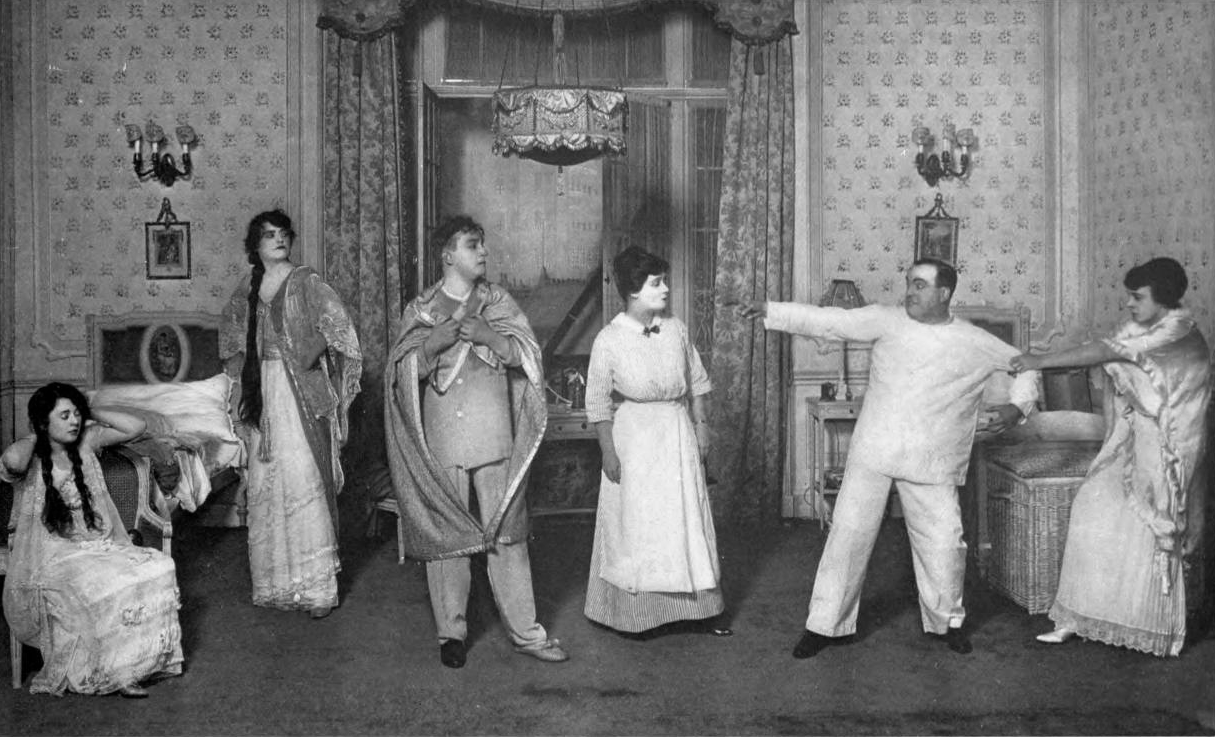
- Scene from Act 2
- Original language: English
- Written by: Salisbury Field and Margaret Mayo
- Genre: Comedy

Premiere
- Date: Fulton Theatre, Broadway August 14, 1914

Twin Beds is a 1914 comedic play by Salisbury Field and Margaret Mayo, based on Field's 1913 novel of the same name, which played on Broadway and was also the basis for multiple film adaptations. The play debuted on August 14, 1914, at the Fulton Theatre, and ran on Broadway for 411 performances.

The play was not immediately a success upon release despite getting positive reviews, perhaps due to the start of World War I. Producer William Harris Jr. then engaged in a wild marketing scheme where trucks with big ads for the show, pulled by horses, would "break down" at busy intersections. Soon the show was playing to packed houses.

Prior to opening, there was a brief controversy over alleged similarities between the play and the play Apartment 12 K which had been rushed to opening to beat it. Though the plays have a similar opening gambit, they were not the same, and Apartment 12 K only had a short unsuccessful run. Four warmup performances of Twin Beds the week before opening on Broadway were done at the Savoy Theatre in Asbury Park, New Jersey.

By June 1915, the play shifted from the Fulton Theatre to the Harris Theatre, where it completed its 411-performance run. Irene Haisman replaced Madge Kennedy and Reginald Denny replaced John Westley for the Harris run. Multiple companies embarked on road tours around August 1915.

The Oxford Companion to American Theatre describes the play as "one of the era's most popular comedies."

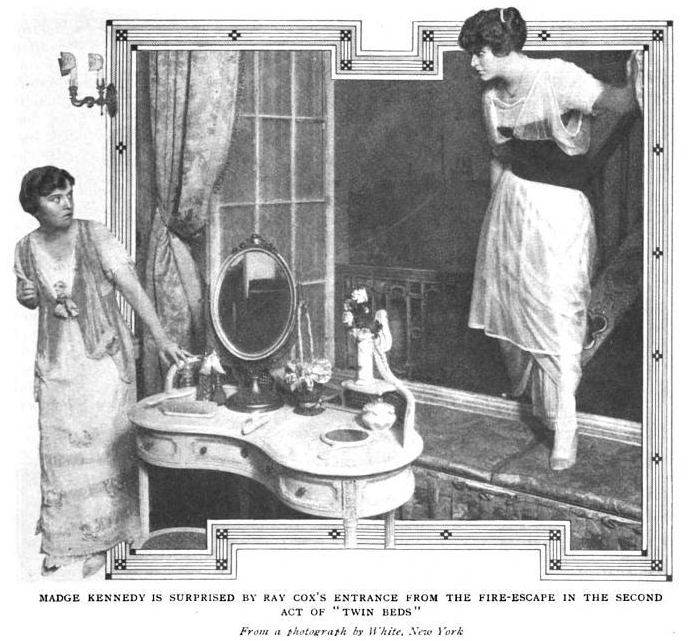
Madge Kennedy (left) and Ray Cox in Act Two

== Original Broadway cast ==
- Madge Kennedy as Blanch Hawkins
- Charles Judels as Signor Monti
- John Westley as Harry Hawkins
- Ray Cox as Signora Monti
- Georgie Lawrence as Norah
- Mabel Acker as Amanda Davis
- John Cumberland as Andrew Larkin
