= Margaret Mayo (playwright) =

American playwright, actress and early screenwriter (1882–1951)

- Mayo c. 1919
- Born: Lillian Elizabeth Slatten; November 19, 1882; Brownsville, Illinois, United States
- Died: February 25, 1951 (aged 68); Ossining, New York, United States
- Occupations: Playwright, screenwriter, actress
- Spouse: Edgar Selwyn (m. 1901; div. 1919)

Margaret Mayo, born Lillian Elizabeth Slatten, was an American actress, playwright, and screenwriter.

== Life and career ==
She was raised on a farm near Brownsville, Illinois. Later, she was educated at the Girl’s College in Fox Lake, Wisconsin; the Convent of the Sacred Heart in Salem, Oregon; and at Stanford University. In her teen years, she traveled to New York City to pursue an acting career. She won a small part in a play named Thoroughbred at the Garrick Theatre.

She met her future husband, fellow actor Edgar Selwyn, in 1896. The same year, she began her writing career. She and Selwyn married in 1901.

She worked as many things: adapter, actress, film company founding partner, playwright, and a writer. Until about 1917, Mayo averaged about a play per year. Her earliest successes were adaptations of novels: The Marriage of William Ashe (1905) and The Jungle (1907). However, Mayo is best remembered as the author of more original plays such as Polly of the Circus (1907), Baby Mine (1910), Twin Beds (1914), and Seeing Things (1920), written with Aubrey Kennedy. Her work utilized parody and satire to talk about social issues.

She adapted several of her plays for the silent screen. Her play Polly of the Circus became the first film produced in 1917 by the Goldwyn Company, of which she was a founding member. After a year as head of the scenario department, she left to go overseas and entertain the troops.

In 1919, Mayo and Selwyn got divorced. Afterward, Mayo changed her name to Elizabeth Mayo and moved to New York to live with her mother. In 1926, she signed the Agreement of American Dramatists, a document that led to the foundation of the Dramatists Guild. She also began selling real estate.

As she got older, she began to write about the spiritual world. Mayo was instrumental in making housing arrangements for Indian spiritual teacher Meher Baba at Harmon, near New York City, during his first visit to America in 1931. She owned and provided the stone house retreat where he stayed on this trip.

== Death ==
Margaret Mayo died on February 25, 1951, in Ossining, New York. She is buried in St. Francis of Assisi Cemetery in Mount Kisco, New York.
