= Flora Parker DeHaven =

American actress (1883–1950)

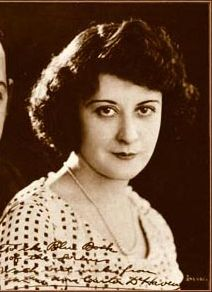
- from The Blue Book of the Screen
- Born: Flora Parker; September 1, 1883; Perth Amboy, New Jersey, U.S.
- Died: September 9, 1950 (aged 67); Los Angeles, California, U.S.
- Occupation: Actress
- Spouse: Carter DeHaven (m. 1905; div. 1928)
- Children: Gloria DeHaven

Flora Parker DeHaven (September 1, 1883 – September 9, 1950) was an American actress.

Flora Parker, who was a Paramount-Artcraft co-star with her husband, Carter DeHaven, was born at Perth Amboy, New Jersey. Early in life, she displayed a desire to go on the stage. Her initial stage appearance was made at New Orleans in stock. She became a leading lady for Nat Goodwin before going into vaudeville with her husband.

She played the Queen in Queen of the Moulin Rouge. Mrs. DeHaven was an exceptionally fine dancer. Her screen debut was made under the Universal banner, from which company she went to Goldwyn as co-star with her husband in a series of two-reel comedies and then to Paramount-Artcraft, also as co-star. She was often billed as "Mrs. Carter DeHaven". She was of medium height and had a dark complexion and dark eyes. She was the mother of actress Gloria DeHaven.

DeHaven's Broadway credits include His Little Widows (1917), All Aboard (1913), The Girl and the Wizard (1909), The Queen of the Moulin Rouge (1908), and Mr. Bluebeard (1903).

On September 9, 1950, DeHaven died of a heart attack in Hollywood, California, at age 67.
