= Pickett Fire =

2025 wildfire in Napa County, California

- Part of the 2025 California wildfires
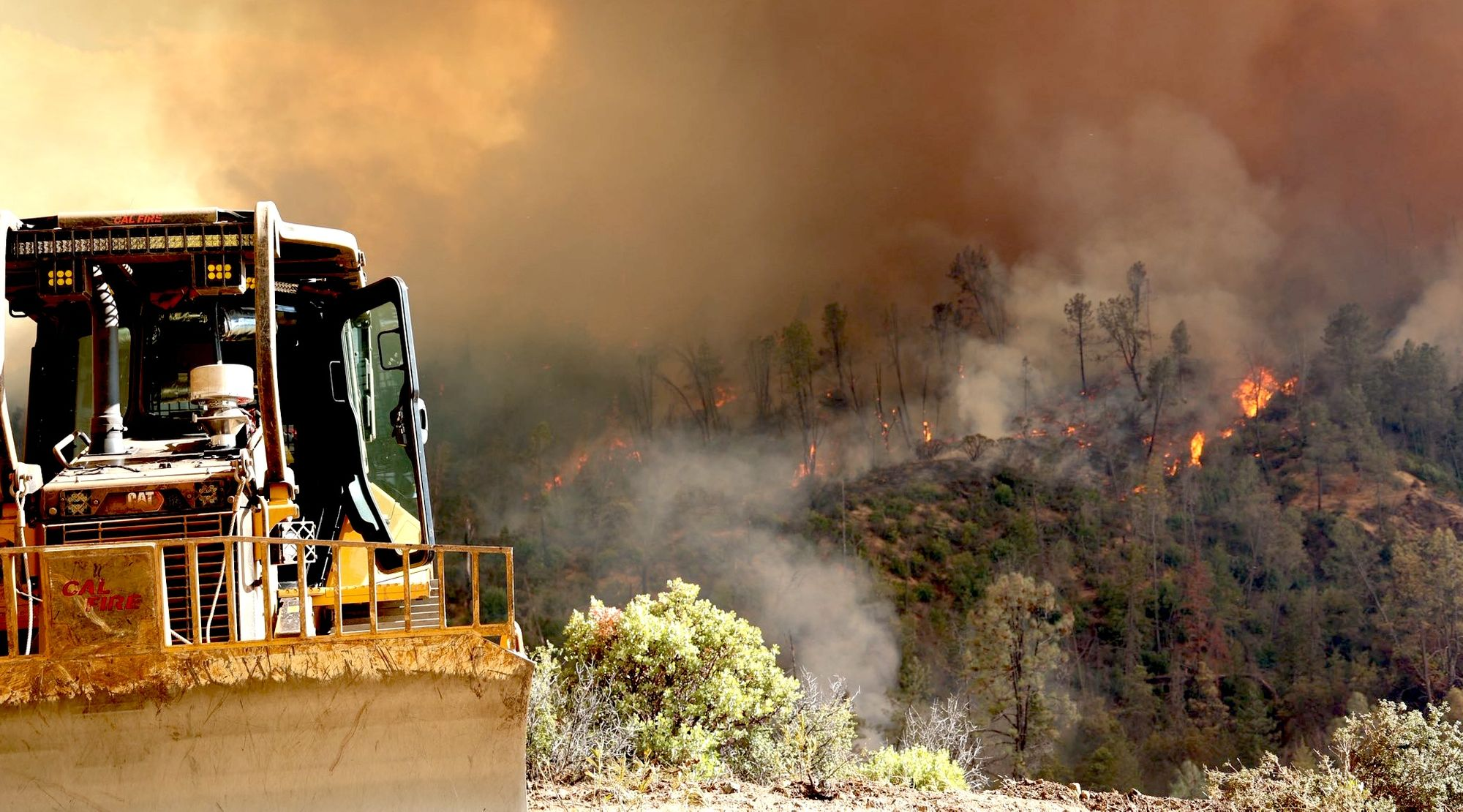
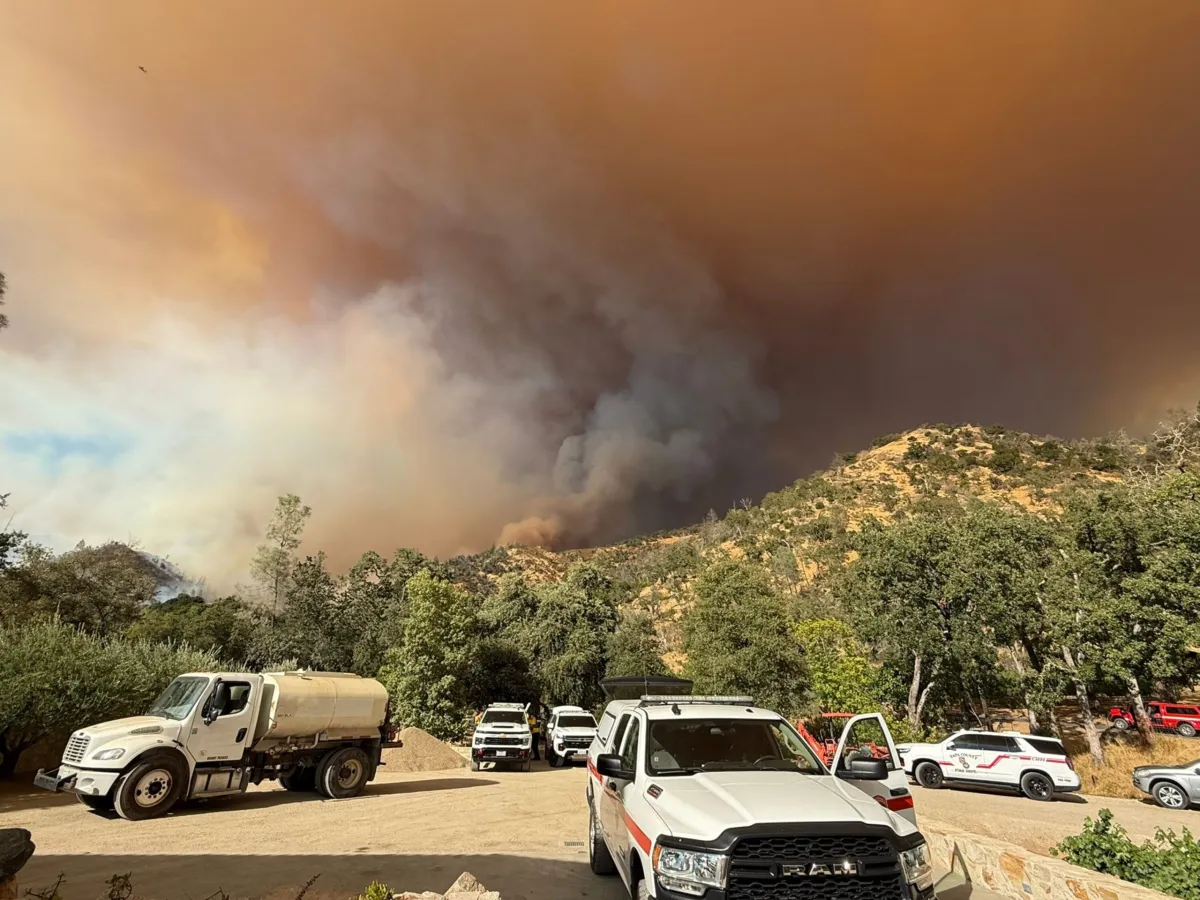
- Smoke plumes and flames from the Pickett Fire on the afternoon of August 22, 2025 Smoke clouds from the Pickett Fire rise above CAL FIRE units on August 21, 2025 Satellite view of the Pickett Fire on August 24, showing smoke drifting over Lake Berryessa
- Date: August 21, 2025 – September 7, 2025 (17 days)
- Location: Northeast of Calistoga, California
- Coordinates: 38°36′00″N 122°33′07″W

Statistics
- Status: Extinguished
- Perimeter: 100% contained
- Burned area: 6,819 acres (2,760 ha)
- Land use: Federal, nonprofit, state, private

Impacts
- Deaths: 0
- Injuries: 0
- Evacuated: Approximately 190
- Structures destroyed: 1 single family residence, 4 outbuildings
- Cost: $65 million (agricultural damage) $33 million (suppression efforts) $6 million (structural damage)

Ignition
- Cause: A winery worker allegedly disposed of hot ashes into a burn pile that later ignited the fire

Map
- Location within California

The Pickett Fire was a wildfire that burned north of Calistoga, California that began on August 21, 2025 and was 100 percent contained on September 7. (Note: Containment measures control lines around a fire's perimeter that the fire should not cross. 100 percent containment does not necessarily mean a hazard no longer exists in or around the fire perimeter or the fire has stopped burning.) The fire started off of Pickett Road, near the address of the wine company Hundred Acre Wines, at approximately 2:57 pm Pacific Daylight Time (PDT). (Note: All times are in Pacific Daylight Time (PDT) unless otherwise noted.) initially spreading due to high temperatures over 100 °F (38 °C), superfluous vegetation, and inaccessible terrain. It burned largely within the footprint of the 2020 Glass Fire and was the largest wildfire in the Napa Valley since the aforementioned blaze.

Evacuations were ordered in the fire's immediate area in rural Napa County, growing to 2,131 acres (862 ha) that night. A health advisory was issued for residents in Napa, Solano, and Sonoma counties due to smoke. Strong winds caused the Pickett Fire to "virtually double" on the night of August 22, spreading to 4,690 acres (1,900 ha). Evacuation orders and warnings (Note: An evacuation warning signifies there is a potential threat to life or property and an evacuation order is a lawful order to evacuate due to immediate threat to life or property.) were issued in Angwin, Aetna Springs, and Pope Valley. Increased winds were likely responsible for additional fire activity and spread eastward overnight on August 23; the fire threatened several structures in Aetna Springs, but successful firing operations cleared vegetation between the Pickett Fire and such structures. Growth slowed August 25 onward. All evacuation notices were lifted on September 2, with roughly 190 residents under evacuation orders at the fire's peak.

The Pickett Fire destroyed one single-family residence and four outbuildings. The fire threatened several wineries and structures, including the Aetna Springs Resort. Preliminary estimates placed agricultural damages to grape harvests and beehives at $65 million: (Note: All monetary values are in 2025 USD unless otherwise noted.) several hundred acres were burned, but approximately 80 percent of agricultural damage was from drifting smoke tainting harvests. Hazardous waste from the Pickett Fire resulted in the Napa County public health officer issuing a public health advisory. A 45-year-old who was a gardener and contractor for Hundred Acre Wines is being tried for one count of felony negligence after admitting to disposing hot ashes that allegedly ignited the fire. Over 30 wineries and vineyards in the Napa Valley and Howell Mountains have filed suit for $90 million (2026 USD) against Hundred Acre Wines for damage to 2025 harvests.

== Background ==
The Napa Valley is well-known for its vineyards and wine industry. Approximately 60 percent of the Napa Valley has experienced wildfire since the 2017 season, often impacting grape harvests. The Pickett Fire burned within the footprint of the 2020 Glass Fire which destroyed over 1,500 structures and caused millions of dollars in agricultural damage. The Pickett Fire started around the time most wineries in the Napa Valley had begun 2025 season harvests.

The day the Pickett Fire started, minimal California Department of Forestry and Fire Protection (CAL FIRE) resources used for other wildfires across the state. Crews managed to carve out temporary helipads in areas inaccessible by foot because of successful fuel reduction efforts by Napa Firewise. One resident stated on August 23, "this is comforting [with] resources all over this thing". Several firefighters were experienced in the area because they were assigned to the Glass Fire, whose burn scar the Pickett Fire largely burned in.

The United States Forest Service treated 325,000 acres (132,000 ha) of national forest lands in California, including 72,000 acres (29,000 ha) through prescribed burns. Separately, the State of California treats approximately 125,000 acres (51,000 ha) of wildland with prescribed burns annually. Fuel reduction efforts by Napa Firewise created additional natural firebreaks, which at one point slowed the Pickett Fire's growth towards one neighborhood near the Dutch Henry Canyon. Fuel treatment projects by Napa Firewise led to the establishment of 22 "firewise" communities in the area. It also burned largely in the Glass Fire burn scar, where vegetation had not yet fully regrown, which slowed the growth of the fire. The Pickett Fire primarily burned in downed trees from the Glass Fire and ground vegetation that had regrown and dried out, and the The Press-Democrat reported that the fire spread across "bone-dry hills".

On August 21, the Pickett Fire started near the center of a low-pressure area hovering east of the San Francisco Bay Area. Regionally, temperatures peaked at 90–100 °F (32–38 °C) and lows were between 60–70 °F (16–21 °C). The Pickett Fire was preceded by "a week of extremely hot weather". Winemaker Jayson Woodbridge stated temperatures reached 105 °F (41 °C) the day the Pickett Fire ignited, with winds blowing up to 15–20 miles per hour (24–32 km/h). The Western United States was experiencing a record heatwave. The National Interagency Fire Center stated on August 22, "Hot, dry, and unstable conditions are likely along much of the West Coast near and west of the Cascades and Sierra as near record–setting temperatures 10 – 25°F above normal are expected". CAL FIRE officials described the fire as "slopes and fuels"; its spread was mostly due to vegetation and steep, inaccessible terrain than weather conditions.

The Pickett Fire burned in an area of the Mayacamas Mountains where underlying bedrock is primarily composed of volcanic rocks in the Sonoma Volcanics. Landslide-vulnerable ultramafic rock exists in the northernmost part of the burn area; in the northeastern part of the burn scar, sandstone, shale, and mudstone of the Great Valley Sequence are overlain with silt and silty sand soils, and fluvial and landslide deposits were locally mapped throughout the burn scar, making the land naturally erosive and flood-prone. Several residential, commercial, and agricultural developments, particularly near the southwestern edge of the Pickett Fire's perimeter, are located on the aforementioned flood-prone land.

== Cause ==
Investigators first visited the site of ignition on August 21, the day of ignition. An "escaped controlled burn" (Note: A controlled burn, synonymous to a prescribed burn, is an intentionally set fire, often to clear vegetation or maintain forest health.) was noted as a potential cause based on initial radio dispatch. Dispatch readings said the supposed escaped controlled burn was 0.5 acres (0.20 ha). Investigators originally began investigating a report of smoldering ashes on August 30. Hundred Acre Wines emailed CAL FIRE investigators possible information related to the fire's ignition by September 19. They stated it may have started in a trailer on their property, possibly due to one battery that was damaged yet remained intact. A then-gardener for Hundred Acre Wines admitted to law enforcement he was responsible for "the disposing of hot ashes into a burn pile" that prosecutors allege ignited the Pickett Fire.

== Progression ==
A vegetation fire was reported on August 21, 2025, at approximately 2:57 pm Pacific Daylight Time (PDT) near Pickett Road north of Calistoga in Napa County. Burning in grass, it was reported to be moving at a moderate rate of spread with short–range spotting. Aerial resources were requested around 3:26 pm. Evacuations were soon ordered, primarily around Pickett Road. Helicopters drew water from local water recycling plants. The Pickett Fire was estimated at 60 acres (24 ha) by 4:30 pm and 1,200 acres (490 ha) approximately one hour later, continuing at a moderate rate of spread. The Pickett Fire spread heavily eastward to the Napa Valley floor. The Pickett Fire was aerially mapped at 2,131 acres (862 ha) by 11:15 pm. One resident predicted that firefighters were working in areas with "zero visibility".

The Pickett Fire on the night of August 22

The North Bay All–Hazard Incident Management Team and 350 personnel were assigned to the fire and continued working overnight. They reportedly used night goggles to continue overnight operations. Containment was reported at 7% and the Pickett Fire grew to 3,993 acres (1,616 ha) by that morning. Firefighters beyond Napa County were assigned to the fire, including a task force from San Diego by August 24. Three structures were threatened. Crews used bulldozers to reestablish previous fire access roads from the Glass Fire. It was primarily spreading southeast, away from Calistoga, as more evacuation orders were issued. Napa County issued a health advisory from smoke particles. That afternoon, aerial mapping placed the fire at 3,235 acres (1,309 ha), with the size growth attributed to the "fire backing to strategic fuel breaks and historical control lines." Evacuation warnings were issued near Aetna Springs and Angwin as the fire grew into Aetna Springs that night. Overnight, the Pickett Fire made several terrain-driven runs with short-range spot fires; (Note: A spot fire starts from an ember that crosses the fire perimeter.) and the fire "virtually doubled in size" due to strong winds.

The Pickett Fire grew to 4,690 acres (1,900 ha) on August 23, but the fire did not cross existing containment lines overnight. An evacuation order was issued in Pope Valley around midday. The evacuation center in Napa, Crosswalk Community Church, closed due to little demand. The fire grew to 5,863 acres (2,373 ha), and additional evacuation orders were issued near Pope Valley. Fire activity increased in the northeast section near Aetna Springs Road around 4:45 pm. More resources were requested; all available local CAL FIRE units were assigned to the fire near Aetna Springs Road and Pope Valley Road.. Shortly after 7 pm, the radio traffic reported the fire moving north towards Aetna Springs Road and Butts Canyon Road. Crews conducted firing operations to clear vegetation and created temporary helipads to transport more firefighters to the fire line. The fire came within several yards of several structures in Aetna Springs, including the Aetna Springs Resort. The Pickett Fire grew by 270 acres (110 ha) overnight, reaching a size of 6,803 acres (2,753 ha), with increased fire activity possibly caused by additional wind. Crews managed to slow the fire's eastern spread into Pope Valley; firing operations on the eastern edge of the fire cleared significant vegetation near the Pickett Fire's perimeter.

Ryan Alsop, the Napa County Chief Executive Officer and Director of Emergency Services, signed an emergency proclamation for the Pickett Fire on August 24, which allowed access to additional state and federal suppression resources. Additional resources arrived to the fire scene; the total number of personnel increased to 2,045. Two evacuation order zones, one west and one northeast of the fire perimeter, were downgraded to evacuation warning zones. Unauthorized drone operations impacted aerial operations that morning, but the fire did not grow throughout the day. An evacuation center opened that day, but no evacuees showed up and it closed after four-and-a-half hours. Evacuation orders were lifted on the western edge of the fire.

The fire was described as having "no real growth" on August 25. Evacuation warnings were lifted in northern Angwin. The air quality alert advisory had been extended until August 27. Containment reached 15 percent by the evening of August 25, and the fire remained at 6,803 acres (2,753 ha). A marine layer moved over the fire overnight, raising humidity levels and preventing spread overnight. The air quality advisory in Napa, Solano, and Sonoma counties was lifted due to higher humidity, cooler winds, and decreased fire activity. Two evacuation order zones were reduced to evacuation warnings, and three evacuation warning zones were lifted, including one zone in Pope Valley. Containment reached 25 percent that evening. While there were windy conditions throughout the day, the Pickett Fire did not spread.

The marine layer returned and winds weakened overnight into August 27, increasing humidity in lower elevations of the Napa Valley. Suppression efforts had transitioned to mop-up and perimeter patrol.Containment increased to 29 percent, and CAL FIRE reported the Pickett Fire was unlikely to spread further. Two evacuation warning zones were lifted: one west of Butts Canyon Road and north of Pope Valley Road and the other west of Aetna Mine Road near Oat Hill Road. Evacuation warnings were lifted north of the fire perimeter. Containment increased to 33% the morning of August 28 due to favorable weather conditions for suppression. Crews were reportedly working to reach the interior of the Pickett Fire's burn area. Similar conditions were reported to last through the day. One evacuation order zone north of the fire was reduced to an evacuation warnings and two evacuation warning zones southwest of the fire were lifted.

The damage assessment was completed on August 29. CAL FIRE announced the Pickett Fire was 51 percent contained that evening. Two evacuation order zones, one west of Pope Valley Road and one south of James Creek Road, were reduced to evacuation warnings; two evacuation warning zones were lifted, one southwest of the fire near Calistoga and one north of the fire. The Pickett Fire grew minimally to 6,819 acres (2,760 ha) on August 30, but containment increased to 65 percent. A flare-up was reported near Aetna Springs Road on August 31. While it attracted aircraft attention, ts forward progress (Note: Forward progress is a wildfire's spread, so "forward progress stopped" means that part of a wildfire or the wildfire itself is no longer spreading.) was stopped in approximately 45 minutes and aircraft were released.

CAL FIRE lifted all evacuation orders and evacuation warnings on September 2, most of which in heavily wooded and steep areas north of the Napa Valley, but residents in former evacuation order areas were told to "prepare for a quick exit". Containment increased to 92 percent. The burn scar of the fire remained restricted to emergency personnel. Management of the fire returned to the local CAL FIRE Sonoma–Lake–Napa units, and approximately 1,000 firefighters remained assigned to the fire.

The Pickett Fire reached 100 percent containment on September 7 at 7 pm.

== Effects ==
=== Damage ===
On August 29, damage inspection teams confirmed that four outbuildings and one single-family residence were destroyed by the Pickett Fire. CAL FIRE reported the residential structure was likely abandoned due to "its remote location and lack of access routes." A stone lodge built in the 1920s at the present-day Cleary Reserve was damaged, and a small house in the reserve was destroyed. The fire threatened several wineries and vineyards. The Pickett Fire became the largest wildfire in Napa County since the 2020 Glass and Hennessey fires. Suppression efforts cost roughly $33 million on September 2. According to prosecutors, the fire allegedly caused $6 million (2026 USD) in structural damages. No injuries or fatalities were reported. The Table Rock area of Robert Louis Stevenson State Park was damaged, particularly the area near Palisades Trail. Crews conducted post-fire mitigation.

The Napa County Agricultural Commissioner estimated the Pickett Fire caused $65 million in agricultural damages. Smoke "drift[ed] for miles" across the Napa Valley and its wineries. Approximately 80 percent of damage to grapes was from smoke and not flames, despite several hundreds of acres burned by the fire. Heat-related damage to beehives was also reported. However, the westerly winds resulted in less grape damage for several wineries when compared to the Glass Fire. In total, approximately 1,500 acres (610 ha) (roughly three percent of production area in the Napa Valley) was damaged by the Pickett Fire.

=== Closures and evacuations ===
Traffic in downtown Napa was disrupted when the Incident Command station relocated to the Napa Valley Expo. Aetna Springs Road fully closed, and access to Pickett Road, James Creek Road, and Rosedale Road was limited to residents only. All trails in Robert Louis Stevenson State Park temporarily closed. The Land Trust of Napa County temporarily closed the Duff Preserve, Wildlake Preserve, and part of the Aetna Springs Reserve.

Evacuation orders and warnings were issued in and around Calistoga, Angwin, Aetna Springs, and Pope Valley. About 190 residents were placed under evacuation orders, and roughly 360 residents were placed under evacuation warnings.

=== Environmental impacts ===
Soil burn severity map

Debris flow estimate map

Landslide hazard map

Mineralogical concern map

The air quality in and around Calistoga, Pope Valley, and the Howell Mountains was "likely to reach unhealthy levels", according to Napa County. The county issued a health advisory on August 22. An air quality advisory was issued for Napa, Solano, and Sonoma counties until August 27, but it was lifted on August 26 due to more favorable atmospheric conditions and decreased fire activity. The California Geological Survey reported that most soil was expected to fully recover two to five years after the fire.

The Pickett Fire burned through the Cleary Reserve on August 23. The Press Democrat reported, "it's a graveyard". However, the fire did not destroy the park's redwood grove, which are the most inland natural stand in California. Fire crews were warned about falling trees, particularly those that also burned in the Glass Fire.

The Napa County public health officer issued a public health emergency, stating it was because of "imminent environmental threats to safe water supplies and hazardous waste and materials". The Napa Valley Watershed was threatened by such hazardous debris. The fire burned adjacent to and in the Calistoga Mining District; the Aetna Mining District lies downstream of the Pickett Fire burn scar, so runoff could potentially carry carcinogenic and other hazardous chemicals into streams that lead to the Pope Creek tributaries that lead to Lake Berryessa, which provides drinking water to Napa and Solano counties. Methylmercury levels in Lake Berryessa have historically prompted state-issued recommendations for consumption of fish; inundation of mines in and around the Pickett Fire burn scar could increase methylmercury levels in the lake.

The Pickett Fire prompted flooding concerns across its burn scar as it created water-repellant soil. However, residents in Pope Valley thought the hydrology and topography of the canyon was "in their favor": most streams and creeks in the valley were dry and runoff typically flows down the hills and mountains into the creeks. The major threat, as described by KTVU, was debris clogging up waterways during atmospheric rivers.

Flooding near the Swartz Creek Bridge on Aetna Springs Road, where 80 percent of the area around was largely unburned or burned at low or very low intensity, had low flooding potential overall, and included a low potential for inundation to reach the road. The Mineral Springs Resort, which was largely burned at a low intensity, was expected to have impactful flooding. Several agricultural ponds were burned at moderate intensity. All four tributaries reportedly had between a 30 and 40 percent chance of debris flow.

LiDAR imagery has shown shallow and deep-seated landslides (Note: A shallow landslide originates in the upper layers of rock and soil, often on steep edges. They are rapid, triggered by sustained intense rainfall.; A deep-seated landslide has a failure zone below the roots of trees and other vegetation. They are usually slow and are larger than shallow landslides. They can heavily damage infrastructure or buildings and can be attributed to several causes.) where the Pickett Fire burned in Simmons Canyon. LiDAR imagery has also confirmed shallow and deep-seated landslides in the Dutch Henry Canyon (most of which at very low or low burn severity) from flood and debris flows and debris floods.

== Legal proceedings ==
=== Civil litigation ===
Plaintiffs Outpost Wines, Laelius Winegrowing, and Impensata Wines filed a lawsuit against Jayson Woodbridge and his company, Hundred Acres Wines, on August 5, 2026 in the Napa County Superior Court. They alleged Woodbridge and his company were responsible for agricultural damage to their vineyards on Howell Mountain because the Pickett Fire ignited on the property of Hundred Acre Wines and potential causes for the fire that were under investigation at the time, claiming negligence, trespass, public nuisance, and private nuisance; they alleged the companies owned by Woodbridge exercised negligence through their methods of teaching workers how to handle ashes. At the time, improperly discarded ashes were under investigation as a potential cause of the fire. CAL FIRE investigators determined the fire started on 2343 Pickett Road, an address of one of Woodbridge's properties. Woodbridge and his five corporate defendants transferred the case to the United States District Court for the Northern District of California on August 12. Woodbridge and his corporate defendants stated that, as limited liability companies, that the corporate citizenship is based on the owner's citizenship. Woodbridge is allegedly a resident of Canada and Malta, and the five corporate defendants are parented by Warsaw-based By the Light of the Moon. A hearing was ultimately set for October 8.

Over 30 wineries and vineyards have filed suit for $90 million (2026 USD). PlumpJack Group, a wine company co-founded by Gavin Newsom, reached a private, undisclosed settlement with Hundred Acre Wines as 60 acres (24 ha) of vineyard were burned. Newsom's office refuted a false post on X that alleged PlumpJack Group was the only company that received a state wildfire payout, emailing to Lead Stories, "The claim is FALSE".

=== Criminal prosecution ===
Napa County District Attorney Allison Haley charged a 45-year-old man with a felony charge of recklessly causing a fire of a structure or forest and alleged the fire causes $6 million in damages. He was employed as a contract gardener for Hundred Acre Wines and allegedly disposed of smoldering ashes into a burn pile. He was charged after he told CAL FIRE authorities he was responsible for "the disposing of hot ashes into a burn pile." His first arraignment hearing occurred on September 9, 2026, in which he pleaded not guilty. His next arraignment hearing is scheduled for December 7, 2026, and a civil lawsuit was scheduled to take place on January 20, 2027. He was originally cited with two felony charges and two misdemeanor charges related to the fire in March 2026, but the district attorney's office ultimately decided to reduce the charges.

== Growth and containment table ==
Fire containment status Gray: contained; Red: active; %: percent contained;
Date	Area burned	Personnel	Containment
August 21	1,200 acres (5 km^{2})	215	
August 22	3,993 acres (16 km^{2})	435	
August 23	5,862 acres (24 km^{2})	1,230	
August 24	6,803 acres (28 km^{2})	2,045	
August 25	6,803 acres (28 km^{2})	2,727	
August 26	6,803 acres (28 km^{2})	2,778	
August 27	6,803 acres (28 km^{2})	2,633	
August 28	6,803 acres (28 km^{2})	2,463	
August 29	6,803 acres (28 km^{2})	2,449	
August 30	6,819 acres (28 km^{2})	2,064	
August 31	6,819 acres (28 km^{2})	1,446	
September 1	6,819 acres (28 km^{2})	1,053	
September 2	6,819 acres (28 km^{2})	112	
September 3	6,819 acres (28 km^{2})	112	
September 4	6,819 acres (28 km^{2})	112	
—
September 7	6,819 acres (28 km^{2})		

== See also ==
- 2025 California wildfires
- List of California wildfires
- LNU Lightning Complex fires
- Rocky Fire
