= Missimer Wildflower Preserve =

Protected grassland in Napa County, California

Coordinates: 38°41′50″N 122°24′23″W

The Missimer Wildflower Preserve is a protected grassland in Napa County, California owned by the Land Trust of Napa County. The preserve is situated on considerable serpentine soil, leading to specially adapted native plants. Situated within Snell Valley, the preserve is noted for its biodiversity of flora. An example of native wildflowers in the Snell Creek watershed is yellow mariposa lily, Calochortus luteus.

== See also ==
- Snell Creek
- Category: Native grasses of California
- List of protected grasslands of North America
