= Snell Creek =

River in California, United States

Coordinates: 38°42′13″N 122°24′41″W

Snell Creek is a 2.1-mile-long (3.4 km) watercourse in Napa County, California. It is situated approximately five miles north of Aetna Springs and is a tributary of Butts Creek, which ultimately merges into Putah Creek.

== Plants ==
Snell Valley is noted for its biodiversity of flora, and within Snell Valley is the Missimer Wildflower Preserve. An example of wildflowers in the Snell Creek watershed is yellow mariposa lily, Calochortus luteus.
