= Mysterious Valley Airport =

Coordinates: 38.7493°N 122.3673°W

- IATA: none; ICAO: none; FAA LID: 20CL

Summary
- Airport type: private
- Location: 9 miles north of Pope Valley, California
- Elevation AMSL: 1,410 ft / 430 m
- Interactive map of Mysterious Valley Airport

Mysterious Valley Airport is a privately owned airport located approximately 9 miles north of Pope Valley, Napa County, California. Permission is required to land at the airport. The landing strip is surrounded by hills and is 95 feet fence to fence. It is 3,500 feet in length.

The airport's sole runway is located 4.23 miles to the Northeast of Upper Bohn Lake. Its coordinates are 38°44'57.88"N 122°22'05.7"W.
