= Snell Valley =

Landform in Napa County, California, U.S.

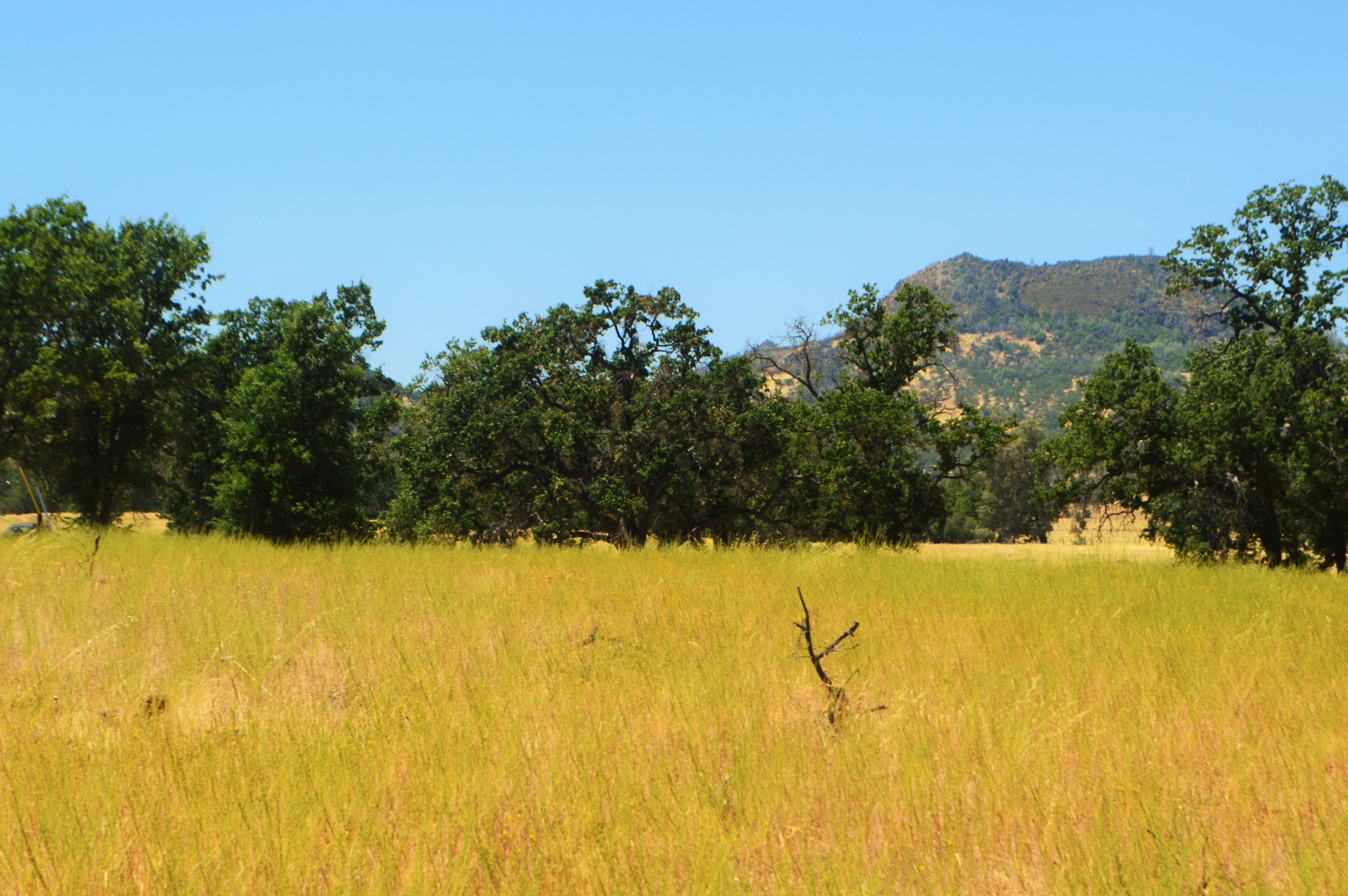
- Snell Valley during July with Snell Peak in background

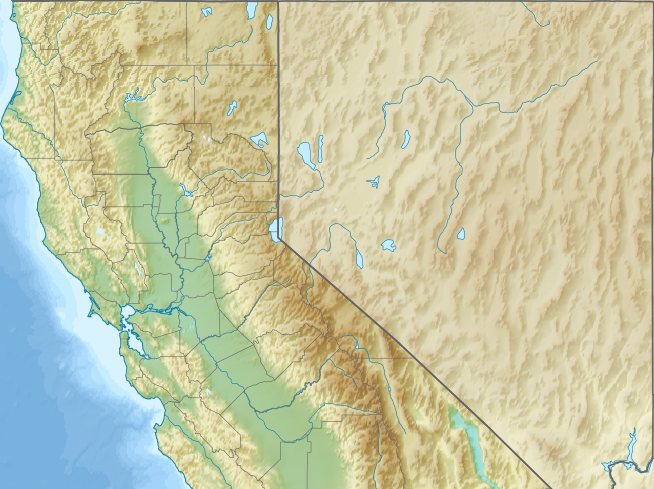
- Location within Northern California
- Floor elevation: 582 ft (177 m)
- Length: 2.3 mi (3.7 km)

Geography
- Location: Northern Napa County, California
- Coordinates: 38.6986°N 122.403°W
- Interactive map of Snell Valley

Snell Valley is a depression landform in Napa County, California. This feature is located approximately five miles north of Aetna Springs. The valley is noted for its diversity of wildflowers, and within Snell Valley is the Missimer Wildflower Preserve. An example of wildflowers in Snell Valley is Gold Nuggets, Calochortus luteus.

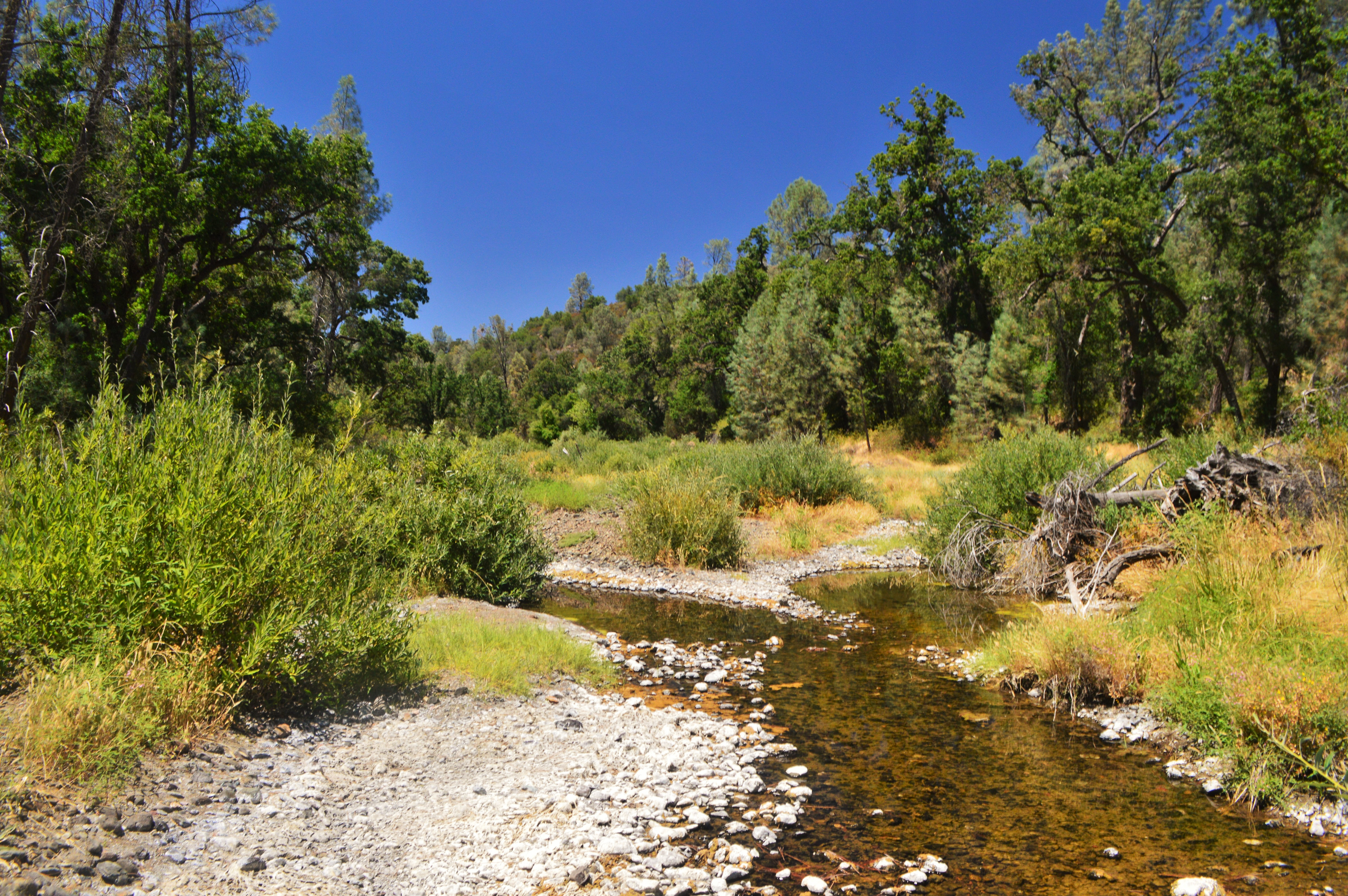
Butts Creek flows through the center of Snell Valley; As seen in July 2016

== History ==
Snell Valley was part of Rancho Guenoc when it was deeded as part of a Mexican land grant in 1845. It is assumed that the valley is named after George and Hiram Snell, two brothers from Germany, who were documented as residents of the Guenoc Rancho in 1857.

In August 2020, Snell Valley was evacuated due to the Hennessey Fire, which burned of over 315,000 acres (127,476 ha) in five counties, including in Snell Valley.

== See also ==
- Snell Creek
