= Andrew Melrose =

British publisher (1860–1928)

Andrew Melrose (5 February 1860 - 6 November 1928) was a British publisher. Although he was noted for publishing theological works, he was also active in promoting new fiction, and offered a substantial cash prize for the best first novel submitted to his firm.

== Life and works ==
Melrose was born in Midlothian. Much of his early career was spent at the London Ludgate Hill offices of the Sunday School Union, where from 1893 he published the Sunday School Chronicle.

He began publishing under his own name around 1899 in York Street, Covent Garden, finally moving to an address next door to Macmillan in St. Martin Street, Leicester Square. Among the early writers he encouraged and published was W.E. Cule, a friend and colleague from the Sunday School Union.

Between 1900 and 1903 Melrose published and contributed to a weekly paper Boys of the Empire, the official organ of the Boys Empire League. The League's stated purpose was" to promote and strengthen a worthy Imperial Spirit in British-born boys". The paper was edited by Howard Spicer (later Sir Howard).

In 1911, Melrose was living at 68 Southwood Lane, Highgate, with his wife Margaret and their children Ernest (20), Douglas (17), Allan (14), Kenneth (11) and Marjorie (9).

Melrose gained a reputation for publishing distinctive books of a theological kind. He was described as "an extremely shrewd, somewhat dour Scotsman, possessing a keen sense of literary values". He was one of the pioneers of offering substantial money prizes to aspiring authors. Two early winners of the 250-guinea prize were Agnes E. Jacomb for her first novel The Faith of His Fathers (1909) and Patricia Wentworth for A Marriage Under The Terror (1910). In 1913, Margaret Peterson won the prize for her novel The Lure of the Little Drum. A notable winner was Catherine Carswell for her novel Open the Door (1920). Melrose also had a keen sense of book design, commissioning illustrations from some of the leading illustrators of his day such as Charles Robinson, Florence Meyerheim, Amelia Bauerle and William Gordon Mein.

Melrose was not afraid of courting controversy in his choice of authors. In 1915 he published Caradoc Evans's story collection My People, a work that provoked outrage for its depiction of Welsh society. He was also responsible for introducing David Grayson to English readers and for publishing the letters of Donald Hankey.

The book on which Melrose chiefly prided himself was The House with the Green Shutters by George Douglas Brown. Melrose had met Brown through Howard Spicer, and the two encouraged Brown to write his grim story of a Scottish village. The following year, Brown died unexpectedly of pneumonia at Melrose's house in Hornsey. Melrose published a memorial edition of Brown's House with the Green Shutters in 1923 and subsequently unveiled a memorial to the author in his Ayrshire birthplace.

Under the pseudonym of E. A. Macdonald, Melrose wrote popular biographies of missionary Alexander Murdoch Mackay, British statesman William Ewart Gladstone and explorer Henry Morton Stanley.

In 1927 Melrose's publishing business was taken over by the Hutchinson group and became known as Andrew Melrose Limited. It published religious and general titles and the imprint lasted until the mid-1950s. Melrose's son Douglas Melrose, who was associated with his father's business, founded the publishing firm of Melrose and Co. of St Martin's Lane.

== Melrose prize winners ==
The Melrose prize was awarded eight times between 1908 and 1923, and seven of the winners were women.

Year awarded	Writer	Title	Adjudicators
1909	Agnes E. Jacomb	The Faith of His Fathers	Andrew Lang, W. L. Courtney, Clement K. Shorter
1910	Patricia Wentworth	A Marriage Under the Terror	Flora Annie Steel, Mary Cholmondeley, Mrs Henry de la Pasture
1911	Miriam Alexander	The House of Lisronan	A. E. W. Mason, E. F. Benson, W. J. Locke
1913	Margaret Peterson	The Lure of the Little Drum	Joseph Conrad, Mary Cholmondeley, W. J. Locke
1914	Marius Lyle (Una Maud L. Smyth)	Unhappy in Thy Daring	H. G. Wells, W. L. Courtney, A. E. W. Mason
1920	Catherine Carswell	Open the Door!	Andrew Melrose
1921	Isabel Beaumont (Constance Isabel Smith)	Smokeless Burning	
1923	A. G. Thornton	An Astronomer at Large	
