= Frances Marion =

American screenwriter, director, journalist and author

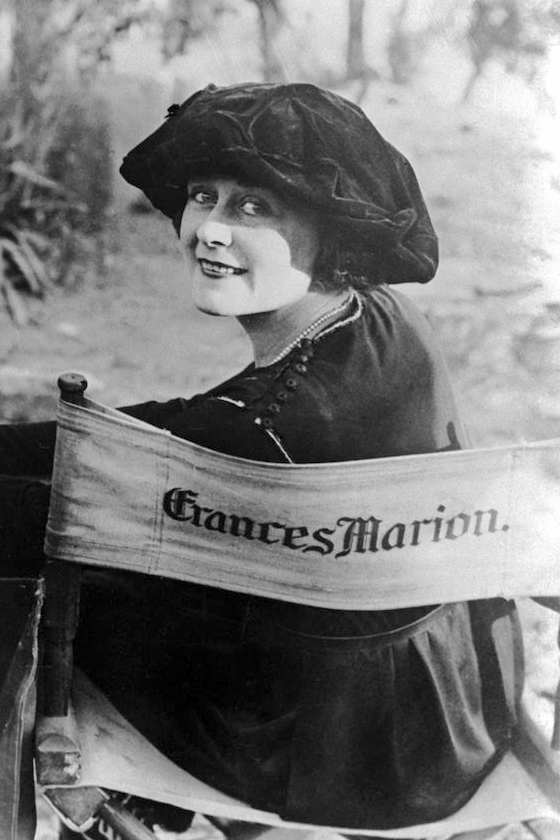
- Marion directing The Love Light, which she also wrote, 1920
- Born: Marion Benson Owens; November 18, 1888; San Francisco, California, U.S.
- Died: May 12, 1973 (aged 84); Los Angeles, California, U.S.
- Occupations: Screenwriter; director; journalist; author
- Years active: 1912–1972
- Spouses: Wesley de Lappe (m. 1906; div. 1910) Robert Pike (m. 1911; div. 1917) Fred Thomson (m. 1919; died 1928) George Hill (m. 1930; div. 1933)

Frances Marion (born Marion Benson Owens; November 18, 1888 – May 12, 1973) was an American screenwriter, director, journalist and author often cited as one of the most renowned female screenwriters of the 20th century alongside June Mathis and Anita Loos. During the course of her career, she wrote over 325 scripts. She was the first writer to win two Academy Awards. Marion began her film career working for filmmaker Lois Weber. She wrote numerous silent film scenarios for actress Mary Pickford, before transitioning to writing sound films.

== Early life ==
Marion was born Marion Benson Owens in San Francisco, California, to Minnie Benson and Len Douglas Owens, an advertising and billboard executive ("billposter"), later, developer of Aetna Springs Resort, Aetna Springs, Pope Valley, California. She had an older sister, Maude, and a younger brother, Len. After Len D. Owens' health failed, Marion lived in Pope Valley, California and later used it as the setting for her 1935 book Valley People.

"Her father divorced her mother when Marion was almost ten and remarried just a few years later. She was sent to a Christian boarding school..."

She dropped out of school at age 12, after having been caught drawing a cartoon strip of her teacher.

"She was suspended from elementary school when she was twelve for drawing satiric pictures of her teacher and was sent to St. Margaret’s Hall, a private boarding school in San Mateo. At sixteen, she transferred to the Mark Hopkins Art Institute in San Francisco"

She then transferred to a school in San Mateo and then to the Mark Hopkins Art Institute in San Francisco when she was 16 years old. Marion attended this school from 1904 until the school was destroyed by the fire that followed in the wake of the 1906 San Francisco earthquake.

"In 1906, she married her 19-year-old instructor from the Art Institute, Wesley de Lappe. Following the advice of family friend and acclaimed writer Jack London, to "go forth and live" so that she could capture the human spirit in her art, Marion undertook a series of odd jobs such as telephone operator and fruit cannery worker."

== Career ==
Circa 1907-1911, in San Francisco, Marion worked as a photographer's assistant to Arnold Genthe and experimented with photographic layouts and color film. Later she worked for Western Pacific Railroad as a commercial artist, then, at 19, as a "cub" reporter for the San Francisco Examiner. After moving to Los Angeles, in 1912, Marion worked as a poster artist for the Morosco Theater as well as an advertising firm doing commercial layouts.

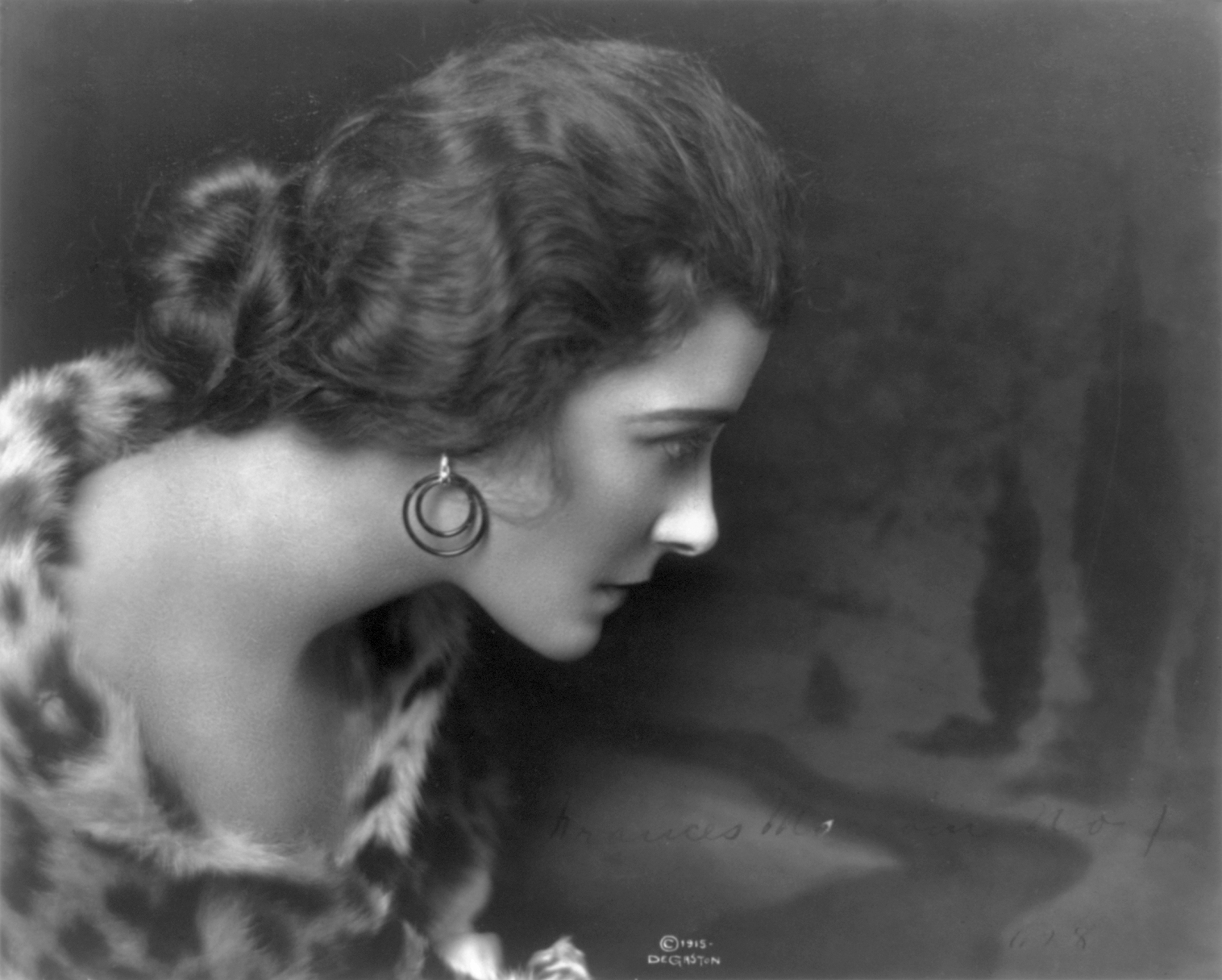
Marion, 1915

In the summer of 1914 she was hired as a writing assistant, an actress and general assistant by Lois Weber Productions, a film company owned and operated by pioneer female film director Lois Weber. She could have been an actor, but preferred work behind the camera.She learned screenwriting from Weber.

When Lois Weber went to work for Universal, she offered to bring Marion with her. Marion decided not to take Weber up on the offer. Soon after, close friend Mary Pickford offered Marion a job at Famous Players–Lasky. Marion accepted, and began working on scenarios for films like Fanchon the Cricket, Little Pal, and Rags. Marion was then cast alongside Pickford in A Girl of Yesterday. At the same time, she worked on an original scenario for Pickford to star in, The Foundling. Marion sold the script to Adolph Zukor for $125. The film was shot in New York, and Moving Picture World gave it a positive pre-release review. But the film negative was destroyed in a laboratory fire before prints could be made.

Marion, having traveled from Los Angeles to New York for The Foundling's premiere, applied for work as a writer at World Films and was hired for an unpaid two-week trial. For her first project, she decided to try recutting existing films that had been shelved as unreleasable. Marion wrote a new prologue and epilogue for a film starring Alice Brady, daughter of World Films boss William Brady. The new portions turned the film from a laughable melodrama into a comedy. The revised film sold for distribution for $9,000, and Brady gave Marion a $200/week contract for her writing services.

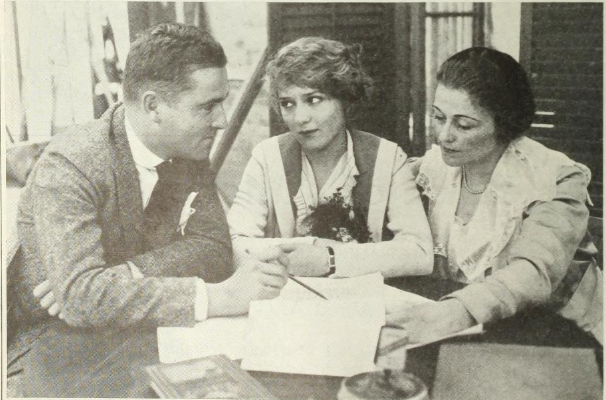
Marion (right) with Marshall Neilan and Mary Pickford in 1917

Soon Marion became head of the writing department at World Films, where she was credited with writing 50 films. She left in 1917 when, following the success of The Poor Little Rich Girl, Famous Players–Lasky signed her to a $50,000 a year contract as Mary Pickford's official scenarioist. Marion was reported at this time to be "one of the highest paid script writers in the business." Her first project under the contract was an adaptation of Rebecca of Sunnybrook Farm.

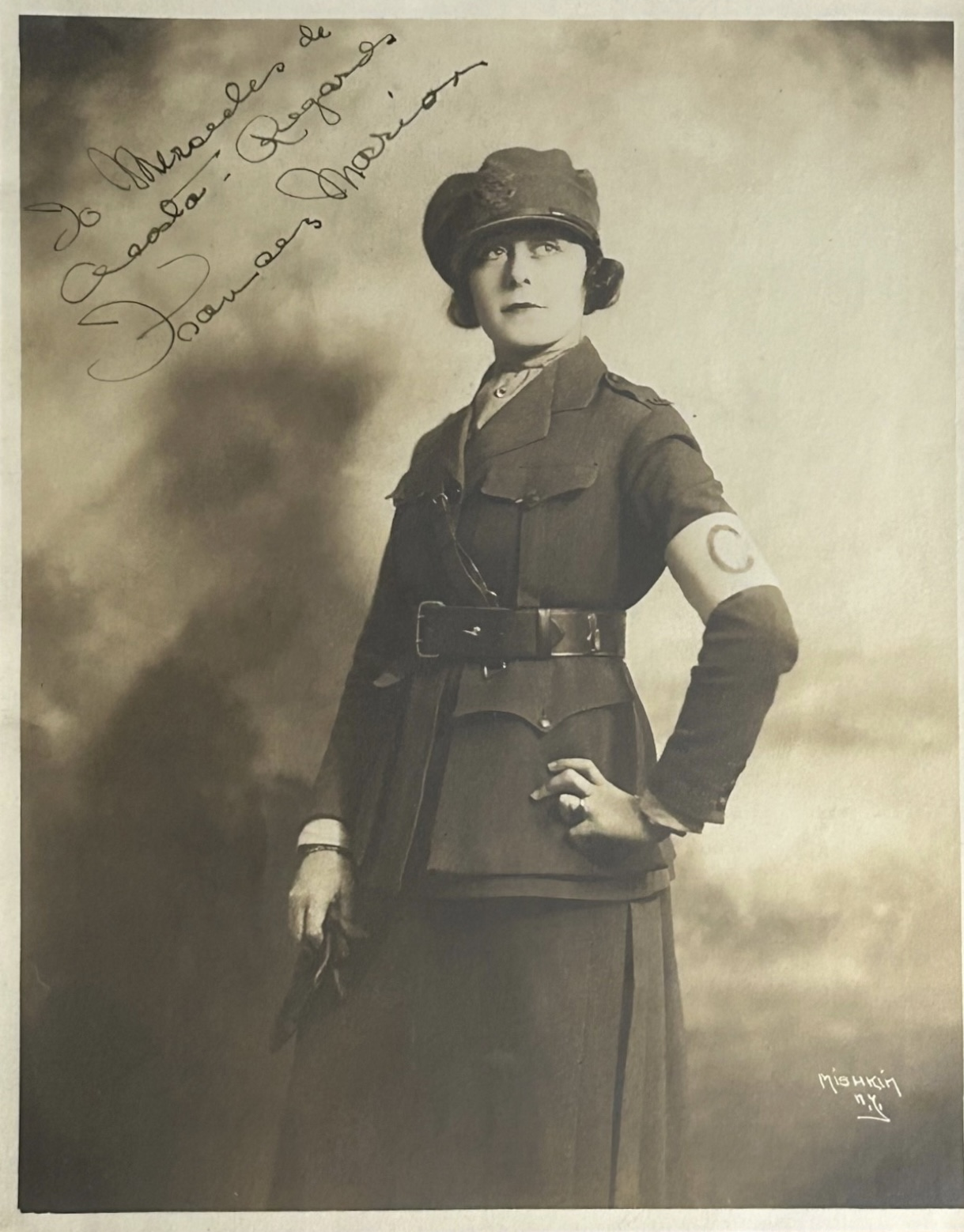
Mation in correspondent uniform, 1918 — inscribed to Mercedes de Acosta

Marion worked as a journalist and served overseas as a combat correspondent during World War I. She documented women's contribution to the war effort on the front lines, and was the first woman to cross the Rhine after the armistice.

Upon Marion's return from Europe in 1919, William Randolph Hearst offered her $2,000 a week to write scenarios for his Cosmopolitan Productions. Marion shared a house with fellow screenwriter Anita Loos on Long Island.

While at Cosmopolitan, Marion wrote an adaptation of Fannie Hurst's Humoresque which was Cosmopolitan's first successful film, and also was the first film to win the Photoplay Medal of Honor, a precursor of the Academy Award for Best Picture. Marion told her best friend Mary Pickford the story she heard during her recent honeymoon in Italy for which Pickford said it was the next movie she wanted to do. Pickford insisted that Marion not only be the writer but also the director of the film, and the result was Marion's directorial debut The Love Light. Her earlier success in adapting the Fannie Hurst novel and her friendship with Hurst contributed to her decision to adapt another Hurst story, "Superman," as her next movie to direct. The resulting film, Just Around the Corner, was a best-seller for the studio. Marion directed only one more movie The Song of Love, based on the novel of the same name by Margaret Peterson, co-directing it with Chester Franklin.

She won the Academy Award for Writing in 1931 for the film The Big House, she received the Academy Award for Best Story for The Champ in 1932, both featuring Wallace Beery, and co-wrote Min and Bill starring her friend Marie Dressler and Beery in 1930. She was credited with writing 300 scripts and over 130 produced films.

"Half of all films written before 1925 were written by women, but writers' names rarely appeared on the screen. In fact, this figure is available only through the copyright records at the Library of Congress, where writers' names had to be included."

== Personal life ==
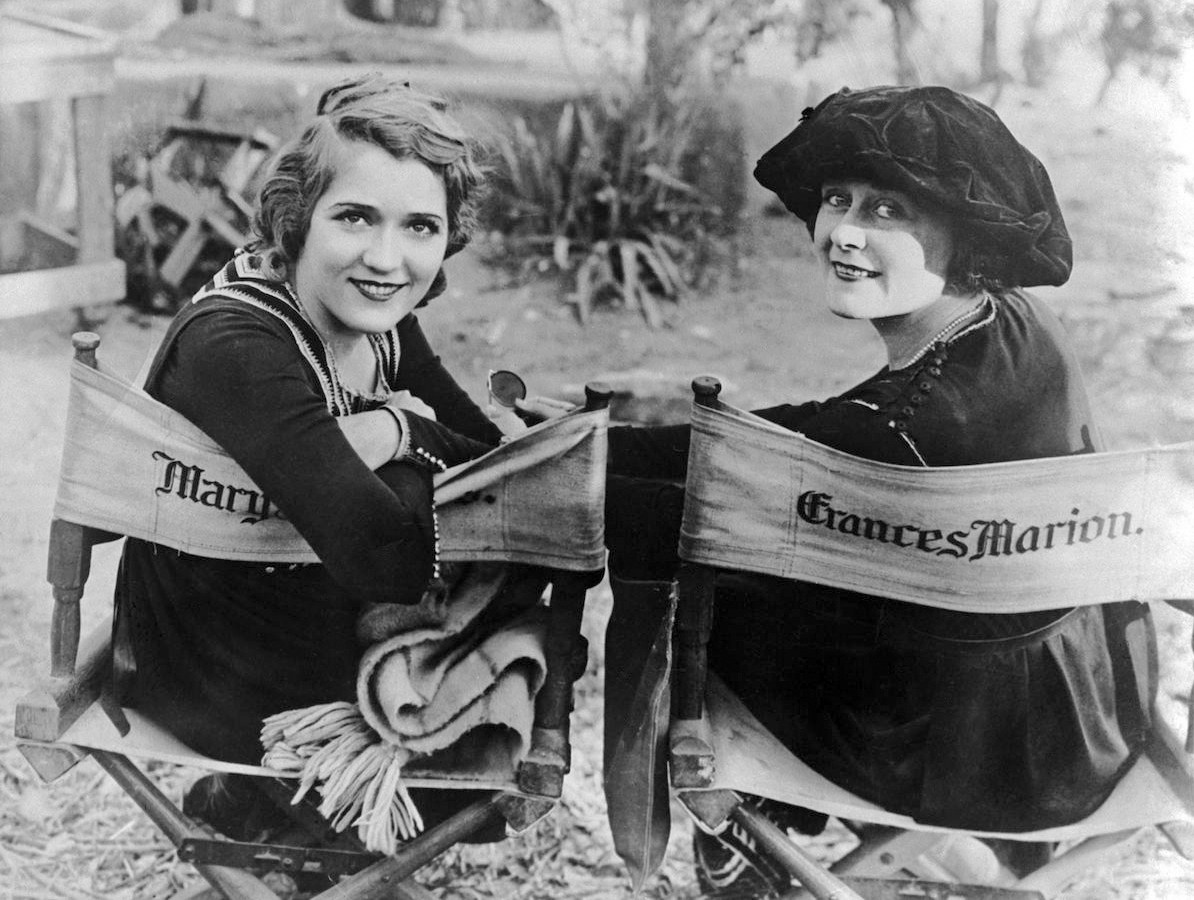
Mary Pickford, and Frances Marion, writer and director, on location, for The Love Light, 1920

In 1914, Marion befriended Adela Rogers St. Johns, Marie Dressler, and Mary Pickford.

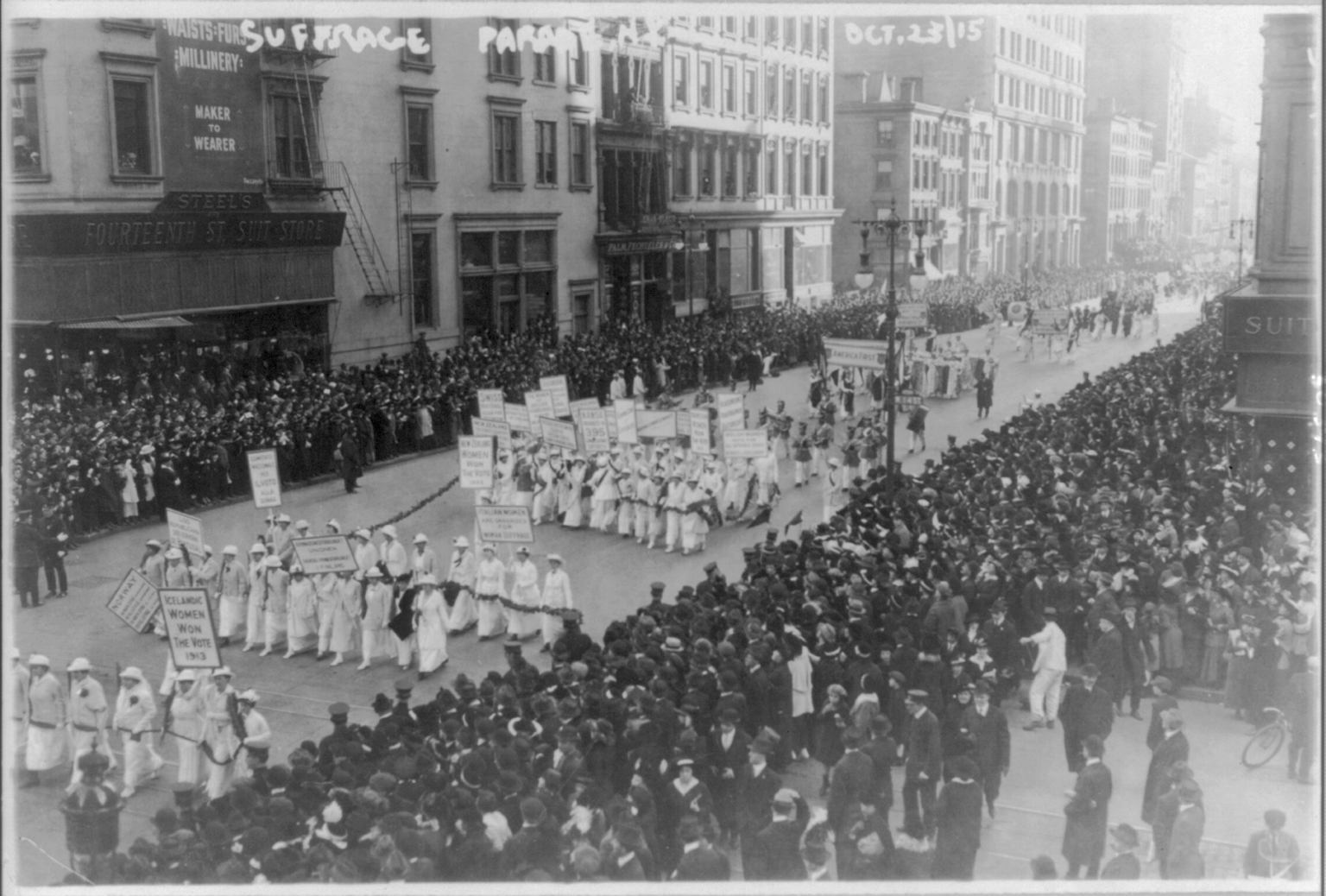
Marion attended this pre-election parade for women's suffrage in New York City, October 23, 1915

On October 23, 1915, Marion participated in a parade of more than thirty thousand supporters of women's suffrage in New York City.

After her success in Hollywood, Marion often visited Aetna Springs Resort in Aetna Springs, California, using it as a personal retreat and often bringing several film-industry colleagues with her on vacations. The resort, in fact, was directly connected to her own family's history, for Marion's father had built the resort in the 1870s.

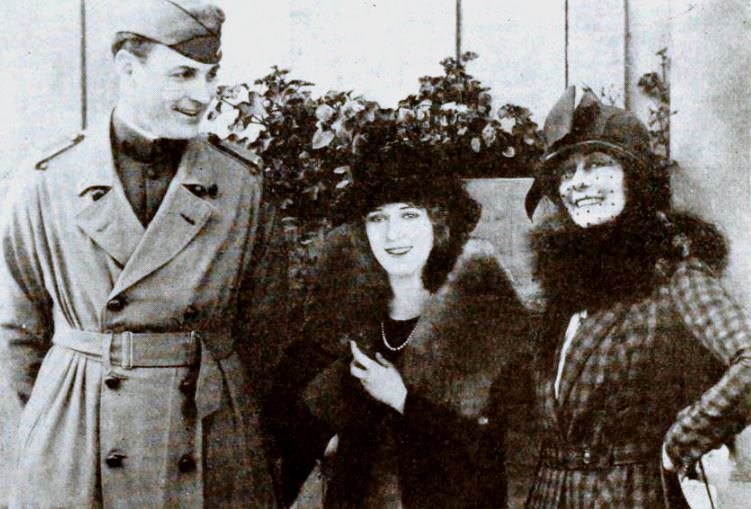
Mary Pickford (center) with newlyweds Fred Thomson and Frances Marion (1919)

Marion was married four times, first to Wesley de Lappe and then to Robert Pike, both prior to changing her name. In 1919, she wed Fred Thomson, who co-starred with Mary Pickford in The Love Light in 1921. She was such close friends with Mary Pickford that they honeymooned together when Mary married Douglas Fairbanks and Frances married Fred.

During the 1920s, Frances Marion and Fred Thomson lived at the 15-acre The Enchanted Hill, in Beverly Hills, designed by architect Wallace Neff.

In early December 1928, Thomson stepped on a nail while working in his stables, contracting tetanus, and died in Los Angeles on Christmas Day 1928.

On 18 January 1930, she married director George Hill, with whom she had collaborated many times. They stayed for a time in the Chateau Marmont, before moving to Venice. She filed for divorce the following year.

She had two sons: US Navy Captain Richard G. Thomson (adopted), and Frederick Clifton Thomson who earned a PhD in English at Yale, taught there and later joined the faculty of the University of North Carolina, later becoming an editor of the writings of George Eliot, publishing editions of Felix Holt, the Radical in 1980 and later.

== Later years and death ==
In 1945, Molly, Bless Her, the 1937 novel written by Frances Marion, was adapted by Roger Burford, as the screenplay for the comedy film, Molly and Me, directed by Lewis Seiler and starring Monty Woolley, Gracie Fields, Reginald Gardiner and Roddy McDowall, released by 20th Century Fox.

For many years she was under contract to MGM Studios. Independently wealthy, she left Hollywood in 1946 to devote more time to writing stage plays and novels.

Frances Marion published a memoir Off With Their Heads: A Serio-Comic Tale of Hollywood in 1972. Marion died the following year of a ruptured aneurysm in Los Angeles.

== Selected filmography ==
Year	Title	Featured Stars	Notes
1912	The New York Hat	Mary Pickford, Lionel Barrymore, Lillian Gish	Contributing writer
1915	Camille	Clara Kimball Young, Paul Capellani, Robert Cummings	Scenario
1915	A Girl of Yesterday	Mary Pickford, Frances Marion, Glenn L. Martin	Actress
1916	The Foundling	Mary Pickford, Mildred Morris, Gertrude Norman	Writer
1916	The Gilded Cage	Alice Brady, Montagu Love, Alec B. Francis	Scenarist/writer
1917	A Little Princess	Katherine Griffith, Mary Pickford, Norman Kerry, ZaSu Pitts, Theodore Roberts	Writer
1917	Rebecca of Sunnybrook Farm	Mary Pickford, Eugene O'Brien	Writer
1917	The Poor Little Rich Girl	Mary Pickford, Madlaine Traverse, Charles Wellesley, Gladys Fairbanks	Writer
1918	Stella Maris	Mary Pickford	Photoplay
1918	How Could You, Jean?	Mary Pickford	Scenario
1918	M'Liss	Mary Pickford	Writer
1918	Amarilly of Clothes-Line Alley	Mary Pickford, William Scott, Kate Price	Writer
1918	The Temple of Dusk	Sessue Hayakawa, Jane Novak, Louis Willoughby, Mary Jane Irving	Writer
1919	The Cinema Murder	Marion Davies, Eulalie Jensen, Anders Randolf, Reginald Barlow	Scenario
1919	Anne of Green Gables	Mary Miles Minter	Writer
1920	Pollyanna	Mary Pickford	Adaptation
1920	The Flapper	Olive Thomas, Warren Cook	Screenplay, story
1920	Humoresque	Gaston Glass, Vera Gordon, Alma Rubens	Scenario
1920	The Restless Sex	Marion Davies, Ralph Kellard	Writer
1921	The Love Light	Mary Pickford, Evelyn Dumo	Director, story (uncredited)
1921	Just Around the Corner	Margaret Seddon, Lewis Sargent, Sigrid Holmquist	Director, scenario
1922	The Primitive Lover	Constance Talmadge, Harrison Ford	Scenario
1922	The Toll of the Sea	Anna May Wong, Kenneth Harlan, Beatrice Bentley	Scenario (uncredited), story
1923	The Famous Mrs. Fair	Myrtle Stedman, Huntley Gordon	Adaptation, screenplay
1923	The Song of Love	Norma Talmadge, Joseph Schildkraut, Arthur Edmund Carewe	Director, screenplay
1924	Secrets	Norma Talmadge	Adaptation
1924	Cytherea	Alma Rubens, Constance Bennett, Norman Kerry, Lewis Stone, Irene Rich	Adaptation
1924	The Dramatic Life of Abraham Lincoln	George A. Billing, Ruth Clifford, George K. Arthur, Louise Fazenda	Story, screenplay
1925	Stella Dallas	Ronald Colman, Belle Bennett, Lois Moran	Adaptation
1925	A Thief in Paradise	Doris Kenyon, Ronald Colman, Aileen Pringle	Adaptation
1925	Thank You	Alec B. Francis, Jacqueline Logan	Writer
1925	Lightnin'	Jay Hunt, Wallace MacDonald	Writer
1926	The Scarlet Letter	Lillian Gish, Lars Hanson	Adaptation, scenario, titles
1926	The Winning of Barbara Worth	Ronald Colman, Vilma Bánky	Adaptation
1926	Son of the Sheik	Rudolph Valentino, Vilma Bánky, Montagu Love, Karl Dane, George Fawcett	Adaptation
1927	The Red Mill	Marion Davies	Adaptation, screenplay
1927	Love	John Gilbert, Greta Garbo	Continuity
1927	Madame Pompadour	Dorothy Gish	Writer
1928	The Wind	Lillian Gish, Lars Hanson, Montagu Love, Dorothy Cumming	Scenario
1928	The Awakening	Vilma Bánky, Walter Byron	Story
1928	Bringing Up Father	J. Farrell MacDonald, Polly Moran, Marie Dressler	Writer
1929	Their Own Desire	Norma Shearer, Belle Bennett, Lewis Stone, Robert Montgomery, Helene Millard	Screenplay
1930	Min and Bill	Marie Dressler, Wallace Beery	Dialogue, scenario
1930	The Big House	Robert Montgomery, Wallace Beery, Chester Morris, Lewis Stone	Dialogue, story Won the Academy Award for Best Writing (Adapted Screenplay)
1930	Good News	Mary Lawlor, Stanley Smith	Scenario
1930	The Rogue Song	Lawrence Tibbett, Catherine Dale Owen	Writer
1930	Anna Christie	Greta Garbo, Charles Bickford, George F. Marion, Marie Dressler	Writer
1931	The Secret Six	Wallace Beery, Lewis Stone, John Mack Brown, Jean Harlow, Clark Gable, Ralph Bellamy, Marjorie Rambeau	Dialogue, screenplay
1931	The Champ	Wallace Beery, Jackie Cooper, Irene Rich, Roscoe Ates	Story; Won the Academy Award for Best Story
1932	Blondie of the Follies	Marion Davies, Robert Montgomery, Billie Dove	Screenplay, story
1932	Emma	Marie Dressler, Richard Cromwell, Jean Hersholt, Myrna Loy	Story
1933	Peg o' My Heart	Marion Davies, Onslow Stevens, J. Farrell MacDonald	Adaptation
1933	Dinner at Eight	Marie Dressler, John Barrymore, Wallace Beery, Jean Harlow, Lionel Barrymore, Billie Burke	Screenplay
1933	The Prizefighter and the Lady	Myrna Loy, Max Baer, Walter Huston, Primo Carnera, Jack Dempsey	Story; Nominated for the Academy Award for Best Story
1933	Going Hollywood	Marion Davies, Bing Crosby, Fifi D'Orsay, Stuart Erwin	Story (uncredited)
1933	Secrets	Mary Pickford, Leslie Howard	Writer
1936	Camille	Greta Garbo, Robert Taylor, Lionel Barrymore	Screenplay
1936	Riffraff	Jean Harlow, Spencer Tracy	Screenplay, story
1936	Poor Little Rich Girl	Shirley Temple, Alice Faye, Jack Haley, Gloria Stuart, Michael Whalen, Claude Gillingwater	Writer
1937	Knight Without Armour	Marlene Dietrich, Robert Donat	Adaptation
1937	Love from a Stranger	Ann Harding, Basil Rathbone	Adaptation
1940	Green Hell	Douglas Fairbanks Jr. Vincent Price, Joan Bennett, Alan Hale Sr., George Sanders, John Howard	Original story, screenplay

== Published works ==
- Minnie Flynn. NY: Boni and Liveright, 1925; free via google books and HathiTrust

- wikisource:Minnie Flynn

- The Secret Six. NY: Grosset & Dunlap, 1931 (novelization of her own screenplay of The Secret Six)
- Valley People. NY: Reynal & Hitchcock, 1935

"The book’s portrayal of the community as isolated inbreds bent on self-destruction and domination understandably ruffled many feathers"

- How to Write and Sell Film Stories. NY: Covici-Friede, 1937
- Molly, Bless Her. NY: Harper & Brothers, 1937
- Westward The Dream. Garden City NY: Doubleday and Company, 1948
- The Passions of Linda Lane. NY: Diversey Publications, 1949 [paperback; revised edition of Minnie Flynn]
- The Powder Keg. Boston: Little, Brown & Co., 1953
- Off With Their Heads!: A Serio-Comic Tale of Hollywood (via Internet Archive (registration required)) NY: The Macmillan Company, 1972 memoir

== Sources ==
- Beauchamp, Cari (1997). Without lying down: Frances Marion and the powerful women of early Hollywood. Berkeley: University of California Press. ISBN 0-520-21492-7. ISBN 9780520214927
- Without Lying Down: Frances Marion and the Power of Women in Hollywood — Turner Classic Movies & Kino Lorber via YouTube
- Beauchamp, Cari. Marion, Frances. American National Biography Online, February 2000.
- Tieber, Claus (2010), "Not Quite Classical Hollywood Cinema: the Narrative Structure of Frances Marion's Screenplays", in Bull, Sofia; Widding, Astrid Söderbergh (eds.), Not so Silent: Women in Cinema before Sound, Stockholm Studies in Film History, Stockholm, Sweden: Acta Universitatis Stockholmiensis, pp. 96, 99–100, ISBN 978-91-86071-40-0 via researchgate
- Leslie Kreiner Wilson. NOTES ON FRANCES MARION'S AUTOBIOGRAPHY: OFF WITH THEIR HEADS June 2015, Pepperdine University Magazine Americana ISSN 1553-8923
- Leslie Kreiner Wilson. Frances Marion, The Secret Six, and the Evolving American Heroine of the Early 1930s, Historical Journal of Film, Radio, and Television, March 2017
- Leslie Kreiner Wilson. Frances Marion, Studio Politics, Film Censorship, and the Box Office: Or, The Business of Adapting Dinner at Eight at MGM, 1933, Literature/Film Quarterly, 42.1, 2014.
- Leslie Kreiner Wilson. The Education of Frances Marion and Irving Thalberg: Censorship, Development, and Distribution at MGM, 1927-1930, Quarterly Review of Film and Video, 31.2, 2014.
- Leslie Kreiner Wilson. Frances Marion: Censorship and the Screenwriter in Hollywood, 1929-1931, Journal of Screenwriting, 3.2, 2012. doi:10.1386/josc.3.2.141_1
- Christopher Scott Zeidel, Frances Marion and Mary Pickford California Polytechnic State University, San Luis Obispo MA History doi:10.15368/theses.2009.25
