= A. G. Thornton =

British writer and journalist (1886–1969)

A. G. (Archibald George) Thornton (1886–1969) was a British novelist, short story writer and journalist. He authored three popular novels which were noted for their realism and humour.

== Life and works ==
Thornton was born in Secunderabad, India, the son of James Thornton, a physical drill teacher, and Mary Thornton. The family returned to England soon after, and Thornton was raised in Hornsey, Middlesex. In 1911, their residence was 8 Summerhill Road, South Tottenham, London.

He became a well-known journalist after be began writing humorous articles in The Star. He later joined the literary staff of the Daily Chronicle.

Between 1920 and 1951, Thornton contributed 27 short stories to The Star.

He won the 1923 Andrew Melrose prize for his humorous novel An Astronomer at Large. It tells how a famous astronomer, past middle age, discovers that real life has eluded him in his devotion to his work and sets out to recapture what he has missed. The Bookman commented: "An Innocent Abroad on Epsom Downs, fun from cover to cover."

Thornton also wrote John Comes Home and Summer Sowing, both published in 1927. According to The Spectator John Comes Home: "describes the evolution of a boy who wins his way from humble circumstances to become a successful business position. John Presber, the son of a mechanic, is destined by his father for an engineering "hand." But, by dint of pluck, economy and perseverance, his mother gets him into a solicitor's office. John's home and Mrs. Presber's subtle mastery of her husband are well represented, as also are John's early days in the City of twenty years ago, his first flirtations, and his friendships with Victor Godfrey, a gadfly youth who lures him into perils from which he emerges safely at last into the arms of his first true love. The story is spun of homely stuff but deserves attention for its fidelity to life and its humour.

The same year, his short story "The Second Chance" appeared in John O'London's Weekly (30 July 1927).

In 1960, Thornton published a philosophical-religious work The Ultimate You, in which he countered what he saw as contemporary pessimism by arguing for the centrality of man in the universe.
