= Donald Carswell =

Scottish barrister, journalist and author

Donald Carswell (11 February 1882 – 2 January 1940) was a Scottish barrister, journalist and author. He married Catherine Roxburgh Macfarlane in 1915; their only child, a son, was J. P. Carswell (1918–1977).
