= Smoke taint =

Wine fault attributable to exposure of grapes to smoke during the growing season

Smoke taint is a broad term for a set of smoke imparted compounds found in affected wines, constituting a wine fault. Increasing incidences of smoke tainted wines are an important issue, given the recent occurrences of wildfires or bushfires in wine grape producing regions during the growing seasons. Examples of wildfires resulting in smoke tainted wines include the fires in South Africa in late 2017, October 2017 Northern California wildfires, the 2019–20 Australian bushfire season, and the 2020 Glass Fire in Northern California.

Whenever ambient smoke comes into contact with developing grapes on vines for a period of time, there is a risk that the grapes will carry smoke taint and impart this in wine made from them. The risk is higher with red wines, because their fermentation process includes the grape skins.

== Causes ==
Smoke taint occurs when developing grapes are exposed to the smoke from wildfires. There are a number of factors that will determine the level of impact the smoke will have on the berries, including the state of berry development during the episode, the grape variety, the type and concentration of smoke and the duration of exposure.

Wildfires in forested areas tend to burn a lot of wood, releasing volatile phenols into the atmosphere. When these are absorbed by developing grapes in nearby vineyards, they can bind to grape sugars within the grapes. These bound phenols, known as glycosides, are likely to be odorless and tasteless until the bond with the sugar is broken during winemaking processes or aging. When the volatile phenols become unbound, the characteristic "smoky" flavor is likely to become detectable. This bond can also become undone upon tasting, when an affected wine comes in contact with enzyme-containing saliva. Thus, smoke taint can exist masked in wine for a period of time before it becomes apparent.

== Sensory compounds and impacts ==
The major volatile compounds responsible for smoke taint include guaiacol and methylguaiacol. Others include ortho-, meta- and para-cresol as well as syringol and methylsyringol. There are a number of enological laboratories around the world that can analyze for the presence of these compounds and help potentially affected wineries interpret the results.

Similar to cork taint, a wine can suffer from a minor, barely detectable case of smoke taint or it can be so obvious as to render the wine undrinkable. Descriptors for the smell and taste of a smoke tainted wine include smoky, wood smoke, chargrill, smoked meats, bacon and ashtray. The taste tends to be persistent, lingering long after the wine has been spat out or swallowed. Some smoke-taint compounds can be very similar to oak-aging compounds, especially if a wine has been aged in oak with a high level of toast. There is some anecdotal evidence that smoke taint can also impact the texture of wine, resulting in what some describe as a "hard" finish.

== Treatments ==
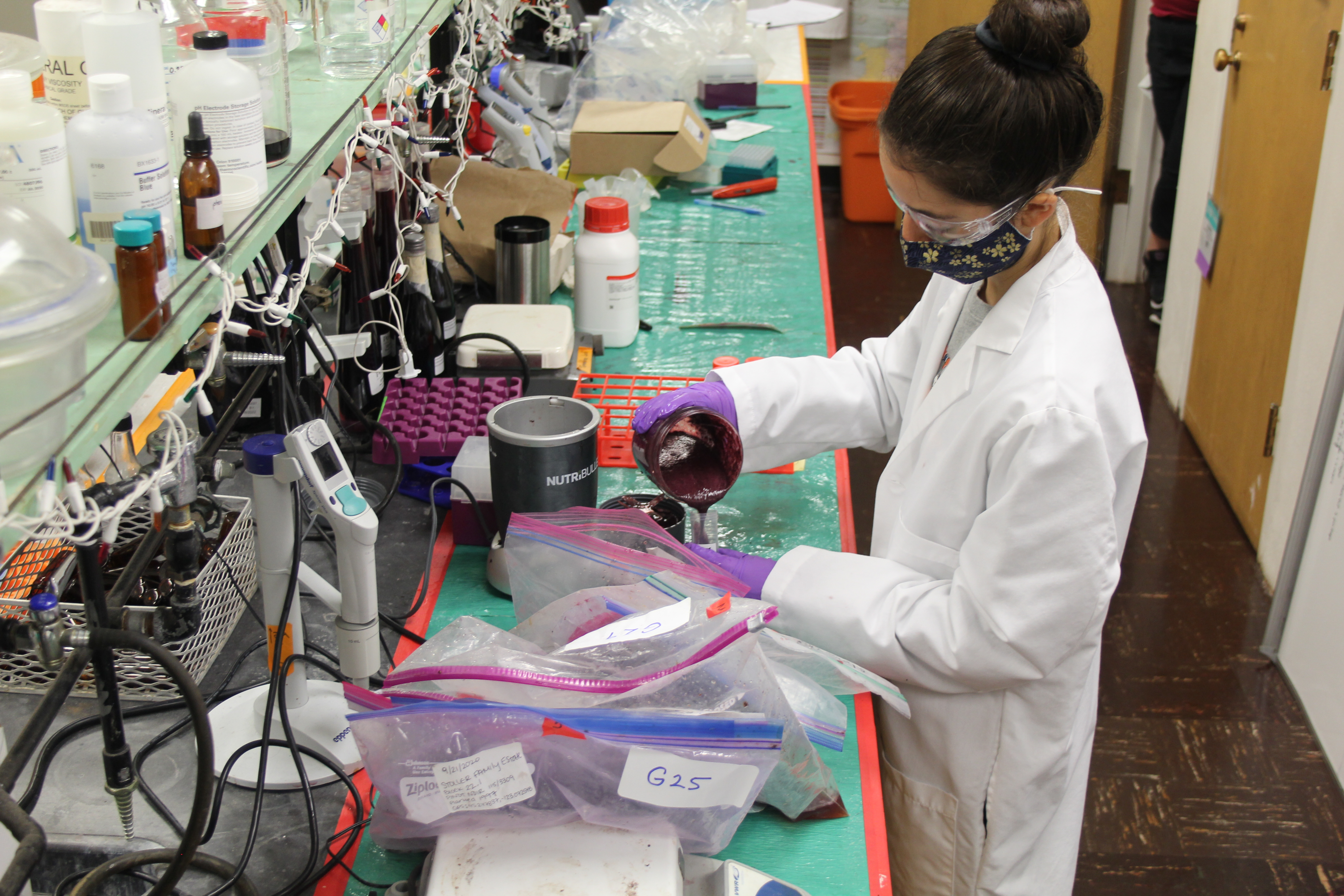
Analyzing grape samples for smoke taint

External videos
- “Smoke Taint with Anita Oberholster, Prepare Your Vineyard for Future Threats”, February 1, 2022.

Berries, grape juice and wine can be tested for the presence of volatile phenols indicating smoke taint, the primary markers being guaiacol and 4-methylguaiacol. If found, there are measures that can be taken to minimize, remove/reduce or counterbalance the impact of smoke taint at various stages of the winemaking process. Common treatments include minimizing skin contact and maceration, adding enological tannins and/or oak chips to contribute to structure and counterbalance the impact of smoke taint, and the use of fining and/or filtration to remove/reduce some of the smoke compounds.
