= Upper Bohn Lake =

- Location within California
- Location: Lake County, California
- Coordinates: 38.732°N 122.447°W
- Type: reservoir
- Surface elevation: 1,109 feet (338 m)

Upper Bohn Lake is a reservoir in Lake County, California, located near Aetna Springs, California. It lies 1,109 feet (338 m) above ground.

The reservoir is public and is a fishing spot. A fishing license is required to fish on the reservoir.
