= Rancho Locoallomi =

Historical Mexican land grant in California

Coordinates: 38.620°N 122.430°W

Rancho Locoallomi was a 8,873-acre (35.91 km^{2}) Mexican land grant in present-day Napa County, California. The rancho's lands encompassed Pope Valley, surrounded by the Mayacamas Mountains.

It was given in 1841 by acting Governor Manuel Jimeno to William (Julian) Pope. The name originated from the Miwok name Lakáa-yomi, meaning "place of the cottonwood".

== History ==
William Pope (1805–1843) was born in Kentucky and became a trapper living in New Mexico. Pope went to California on the Gila route in 1827, and returned to New Mexico. In 1835, Pope and his wife Maria Juliana Salazar (1810–1900) joined an overland party led by Isaac Slover and came to Los Angeles.

William Pope joined with Cyrus Alexander, William Knight and William Gordon on a trip to the Napa Valley in 1841. They stayed at George C. Yount’s home, before the four split up, each claiming a valley for his own. Pope petitioned General Vallejo and the acting governor of California, Manuel Jimeno for a two square league parcel on the east side of Howell Mountain. Juliana and the four children moved from Los Angeles and stayed at Yount's ranch while her husband built their first home on his new property. In 1843, the Pope family moved wagons and livestock from Yount's ranch to their adobe house. But William Pope died in an accident in 1843.

With the cession of California to the United States following the Mexican-American War, the 1848 Treaty of Guadalupe Hidalgo provided that the land grants would be honored. As required by the Land Act of 1851, a claim for Rancho Locoallomi was filed with the Public Land Commission in 1852, and the grant was patented to the heirs of William Pope (Jose Pope, María Pope, Luciana Pope, Isabella Pope, and Delavina Pope) in 1862. A separate claim was filed by John Conn in 1853, but was rejected.

Juliana Pope married neighbor Elias Barnett (1805–1880), a Missouri pioneer. Barnett had come to California in 1841 with the Bartleson-Bidwell Party. He stayed with George C. Yount until 1843, then squatted in Pope Valley, before marrying Juliana Pope.

== Historic sites of the Rancho ==
- Aetna Springs Resort — The mineral springs resort opened in the late 1800s.

== See also ==
- Ranchos of Napa County, California
- Ranchos of California
- List of Ranchos of California
