= Constance Isabel Smith =

British novelist

Constance Isabel Smith (June 1894 – after 1932) was a popular British novelist. She was born in Battersea, London, to Sydney James Smith, a tailor, and Isabel Smith. In 1911 they were living at 7 Spencer Road, New Wandsworth, Battersea, London and Constance was a student.

== Life and works ==
Constance Isabel Smith's novels include Adam's First Wife (1920), Intensity: A Simple Story (1921), The Escaped Wife (1924), Storm Dust (1925), Just Impediment? (1925), Lotus Lane: The Story of a Marriage (1927), and The Tenth of March (1929).

She also wrote under the pseudonyms Isabel Beaumont and Eleanor Reid.

Writing as Isabel Beaumont, she won the 250-guinea Melrose Prize for her 1922 novel Secret Drama. She followed this with Smokless Burning (1922).

Writing as Eleanor Reid, she published The Fortunate Woman (1922), Marrying Madeline (1922), The Fallen (1923), Through the Curtains (1925), The Barrington Scandal (1925), Mackerel Sky (1926), The Tenth of March (1929), Last Will and Testament (1930), and A Wife and Child (1932).
