= Miriam Alexander =

British author (born 1879)

Miriam Alexander, later Mrs Harold Stokes, (born Sept. 1879) was a British-born author of historical novels with Irish settings.

She was born at Birkenhead and educated at home, except for a short period at Alexandra College, Dublin. She was much interested in the Gaelic League but later became alienated from it.

She made her literary debut with her novel The House of Lisronan, a story of the Williamite wars. The novel was awarded the 250-guinea Melrose Prize for 1911. Six editions were sold in less than two months. Her other novels include The Port of Dreams (1912), The Ripple (1913, Miss O'Corra, M.F.H. (1915), and The Green Altar (1924).
