= Catherine Carswell =

Scottish biographer and journalist (1879–1946)

- Born: Catherine Roxburgh Macfarlane; 27 March 1879; Glasgow
- Died: 18 February 1946; Oxford
- Education: University of Glasgow
- Occupations: Journalist, novelist, biographer, poet
- Spouse: Donald Carswell

Catherine Roxburgh Carswell (née Macfarlane; 27 March 1879 – 18 February 1946) was a Scottish author, biographer and journalist, now known as one of the few women to take part in the Scottish Renaissance. Her biography of the Scottish poet Robert Burns aroused controversy, but two earlier novels of hers, set in Edwardian Glasgow, were little noticed until their republication by the feminist publishing house Virago in 1987. Her work is now seen as integral to Scottish women's writing of the early 20th century.

== Early life ==
Catherine Macfarlane was born in Glasgow, the second of four children of George and Mary Anne Macfarlane (née Lewis), middle-class Free Church Glaswegians. She attended the city's new Park School for Girls and grew up in Garnethill, where Glasgow School of Art is situated. She attended evening classes there, where the director of the life class from 1906 was the painter Maurice Greiffenhagen, with whom she later had a relationship. In 1901 she enrolled for English literature classes at the University of Glasgow. Among her professors were Walter Raleigh and Adolphus A. Jack. Although seen as a star pupil she could not, as a woman, be awarded a degree. She then studied music for two years at the Frankfurt Hoch Conservatory, a period she drew on when writing The Camomile. She returned to Glasgow intent on a future in the arts.

== First marriage ==
In September 1904, Macfarlane met her first husband, Herbert Jackson, a Second Boer War veteran and artist suffering from paranoid delusions. She married him after a "whirlwind courtship" of only a month. Thinking he was sterile, he accused Catherine of betraying him when he heard news of her pregnancy and in March 1905 threatened to kill her. He was placed in a mental institution for the rest of his life, being considered too dangerous for release. He never met his daughter, Diana, who was born the following October and died in 1913.

In 1908 Catherine made legal history when her marriage with Herbert Jackson was dissolved after she had shown that his mental illness had started before their engagement, so that he was unaware of what he was doing when he married her.

== Critic and writer ==
Working as a critic for the Glasgow Herald, Macfarlane began a relationship with the artist Maurice Greiffenhagen, who then was at the height of his fame and went on to be an academician. He was her elder by 17 years, married and with a family. Around this time she began to establish numerous literary connections. She later became a close friend of D. H. Lawrence.

Her daughter Diana died of pneumonia in 1913, two years after they had moved to London. Around that time she started work on her first novel, Open the Door!, and became engaged to Donald Carswell, an acquaintance from Glasgow University and the Glasgow Herald, whom she married early in 1915. Their son John was born the following autumn.

The same year she lost her job after writing a favourable review of Lawrence's The Rainbow, but remained in the press as assistant drama critic for the Observer. During the autumn of 1916 she had nearly finished her novel and exchanged lengthy letters about it with Lawrence, who in return asked for advice on his newest novel, Women in Love.

Carswell's Open the Door! finally appeared in 1920 and won her a 250-guinea (£262.10s) Andrew Melrose Prize. Without being autobiographical, her story of the Glaswegian Joanna resembles in many ways her own life in search of independence. Melrose, who selected the book personally, said it made a "profound impression" on him. Two years later she published her second and last novel, The Camomile, another portrait of a woman living in Glasgow at the turn of the century.

== Biographer ==
Neither of her first two books brought her fame or fortune. She became well known only after finishing a controversial biography of Scotland's national poet, Robert Burns, in 1930. Orthodox Burns fans dismissed this frank, demystifying account of the poet's life. The Burns Club attacked her with sermons in Glasgow Cathedral and someone sent her a bullet accompanied by a letter asking her to "make the world a cleaner place."

After the death of D. H. Lawrence, Carswell immediately started working on his biography, which appeared in 1932 as The Savage Pilgrimage. The book's first printing contained passages regarded as libelous by John Middleton Murry, who tried to suppress it (he had authored a rival biography, Son of Woman, to which Carswell's work was essentially a response). Murry's threats to sue for libel resulted in the publisher, Chatto and Windus, withdrawing unsold copies of the first edition from the market and making changes and deletions that affected subsequent printings until, long after Murry's death in 1957, the original text was republished in 1981 by Cambridge University Press.

== Later life ==
In the 1930s there followed three anthologies, some journalistic reviews, and a third biography, The Tranquil Heart (1937), about the Italian Renaissance author and poet Giovanni Boccaccio. In 1936 came a publication dedicated to Lord Tweedsmuir (John Buchan), written in collaboration with her husband Donald and illustrator Evelyn Dunbar (later commissioned as one of the few female official British WW2 artists): The Scots Week-End and Caledonian Vade-Mecum for Host, Guest and Wayfarer (George Routledge & Sons Ltd).

In 1940 her husband Donald was killed in a street accident during the blackout. She continued to live alone in London, working on a two-volume biography of John Buchan together with his widow, Lady Tweedsmuir. Volume 1, The Clearing House, appeared in 1946 and Volume 2, John Buchan by His Wife and Friends, in 1947.

Catherine Carswell died of pleurisy after pneumonia on 18 February 1946, aged 66, at the Radcliffe Infirmary in Oxford. Her son John edited her fragmentary autobiographical texts and published them in 1950 as Lying Awake: An Unfinished Autobiography.

== In fiction ==
Carswell's marriage to Herbert Jackson is the subject of the novel, What We Did in the Dark, by Ajay Close.

== Bibliography ==
- Cathe Giffuni, Jan Pilditch and Carol Anderson: Opening the Doors: The Achievement of Catherine Carswell. Carol Anderson, ed. Edinburgh: Ramsey Head Press, 2001
- Selected Letters of Catherine Carswell, edited and introduced by Jan Pilditch. Kennedy & Boyd, Edinburgh, 2016
- Catherine Carswell's War: Letters 1939–1946. Selected and Introduced by Jan Pilditch. Kennedy & Boyd, Edinburgh, 2016

=== Novels ===
- Open the Door! 1920
- The Camomile 1922

=== Biographies ===
- The Life of Robert Burns 1930 (reissued by Canongate)
- The Savage Pilgrimage 1932 (a life of D. H. Lawrence)
- The Tranquil Heart 1937 (a biography of the 14th-century Italian writer Giovanni Boccaccio)

=== Autobiography ===
- Lying Awake 1950 (an unfinished autobiography that includes some correspondence, with an introduction by her son, John Carswell)
