= The Song of Love (1923 film) =

1923 film by Chester Franklin and Frances Marion

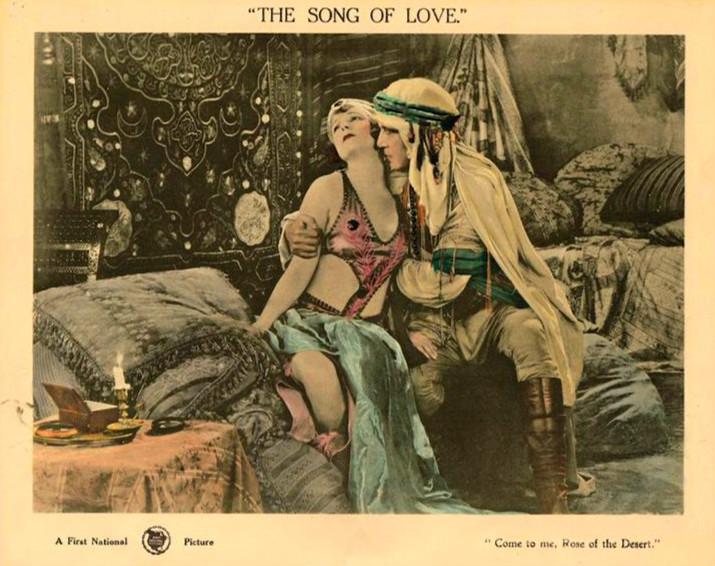
- Lobby card Norma Talmadge and Arthur Edmund Carewe
- Directed by: Chester Franklin; Frances Marion
- Written by: Frances Marion
- Based on: The Dust of Desire; 1922 novel by Margaret Peterson
- Produced by: Joseph M. Schenck
- Starring: Norma Talmadge
- Cinematography: Antonio Gaudio
- Production company: Norma Talmadge Productions
- Distributed by: Associated First National Pictures
- Release date: December 24, 1923
- Running time: 96 minutes
- Country: United States
- Language: Silent (English intertitles)

The Song of Love is a 1923 American silent adventure drama film directed by Chester Franklin and Frances Marion, starring Norma Talmadge, Joseph Schildkraut, and Arthur Edmund Carewe. Frances Marion's screenplay is based on the 1922 novel The Dust of Desire by Margaret Peterson.

== Plot ==
The plot of The Song of Love focuses on the relationships among North African Arab citizens, Tuaregs, and French colonial citizens who live in a small outpost with homes, shops, and a bar/social spot. Norma Talmadge is a dancing girl, whose uncle is viewed as a leader in the Arab community and owner of the social spot. Other key roles are an Arab prince, seeking support from the Tuaregs to regain control of the outpost from the French colonists; a French secret service agent (who becomes the love interest); the French colonial leaders: a French spouse and an American. Through intrigue and conversations, the storyline evolves during the 81 minutes of this movie, resulting in a nighttime battle scene and the main characters professing love for each other.

== Cast ==
- Norma Talmadge as Noorma-hal
- Joseph Schildkraut as Raymon Valverde
- Arthur Edmund Carewe as Ramlika
- Larry Wheat as Dick Jones (credited as Laurence Wheat)
- Maude Wayne as Maureen Desmard
- Earl Schenck as Commissionaire Desmard
- Hector V. Sarno as Chandra-lal
- Albert Prisco as Chamba
- Mario Carillo as Capt. Fregonne
- James Cooley as Dr. Humbert
- Carrie Daumery as Lady with Umbrella (uncredited)
- Gretchen Waterman as Little Girl (uncredited)

== Survival ==
A copy of The Song of Love is in the Library of Congress, Czech Film Archive, and other film archives.

Kino Lorber, Inc., in 2018 produced a series of DVDs to share restored and digitized versions of films produced and directed by women between 1910 and 1923. Since Norma Talmadge produced this film through her company and the co-director is Frances Marion, this film is part of this collection. Many of the films in this collection are now housed within the Library of Congress.
