= Margaret Peterson =

English novelist

Margaret Peterson (1883 – 1933) was an English novelist.

== Biography ==
Margaret Peterson grew up in Bombay (Mumbai), the youngest child of Peter and Agnes (née Christall) Peterson. Her parents were originally from Scotland but relocated in 1873 to Bombay, where her father, a Sanskritist, took a professorship at Elphinstone College.

In 1910 Margaret Peterson relocated to London, where she lived on 25 shillings a week in a girls’ hostel. She initially supported herself with odd jobs—dog-walker, waitress, nanny—before deciding to become a writer. She went door-to-door with her autobiographical first manuscript, Youth at the Helm, pitching it to different publishers with little success. She then met the publisher Andrew Melrose, who declined her manuscript but encouraged her to keep writing. Her next work, Lure of the Little Drum, he accepted for publication and awarded her the firm’s writing prize, a 250-guinea cash award for best first novel.

This success precipitated a prolific career as a novelist, poet, and journalist. Her extensive output was the result of her unsentimental attitude toward writing. A short biographical article, published in the June 1926 issue of The Bookman, recounts Peterson’s resolve "never to shirk work, or to wait for inspirations that do not come, but simply to sit down to it for so many hours a day and write something."

Peterson married in 1915 to A. O. [Albert Oliver] Fisher, who served in the Honourable Artillery during the First World War. According to The Bookman article, he was seriously injured in Ypres, Belgium, and a convalescence of two years followed. Once he recovered, he accepted a position as a colonial civil servant in Uganda, where he and Peterson—who continued to write under her maiden name and the pseudonym, Glint Green—relocated. Both Uganda and India feature in a number of Peterson’s novels.

Margaret Peterson died 28 December 1933, at The Old School House in Rudgwick, Sussex. She was survived by her husband and their son, Peter John Fisher.

== List of literary works ==
- Blind Eyes (1914)
- Tony Bellew (1914)
- Just Because (1915)
- The Love of Navarre (1915)
- To Love (1915)
- The Women's Message(1915)
- Butterfly Wings (1916)
- Fate and the Watcher (1917)
- Love's Burden (1918)
- The Death Drum (1919)
- Moon Mountains (1920)
- Love is Enough (1921)
- Dust of Desire (1922)
- The First Stone (1923)
- Deadly Nightshade (1924)
- The Pitiful Rebellion (1925)
- Pamela and Her Lion Man (1926)
- The Feet of Death (1927)
- Like a Rose (1928)
- The Thing That Cannot be Named (1929)
- Dear, Lovely One (1930)
- Fatal Shadows (1931)
- Poor Delights (1932)
- Twice Broken (1933)
- Death in Goblin Waters (1934)

Her novel Dust of Desire was made into the 1923 film The Song of Love, directed by Frances Marion.
