= J. P. Carswell =

English civil servant (1918–1997)

John Patrick Carswell CB FRSL (30 May 1918 – 12 November 1997) was an English civil servant and author who served as Secretary of the British Academy from 1978 to 1983. Professionally and as an author, he was known as J. P. Carswell, although he published some of his books under the name John Carswell.

== Early life ==
The son of Donald Carswell, a barrister and author, and of Catherine Carswell, also an author, he was educated at Merchant Taylors' School, Northwood, and St John's College, Oxford.

== Career ==
Carswell completed his degree course at Oxford in 1940, during the Second World War, and then joined the British Army. He served from 1940 to 1946, when he decided to enter HM Civil Service. His first significant appointment was as Joint Secretary to the Committee on Economic and Financial Problems of Provision for Old Age (the Phillips Committee), from 1953 to 1954, and he was promoted Assistant Secretary in 1955. He became Principal Private Secretary to the Minister of Pensions and National Insurance in 1955 and was at HM Treasury from 1961 to 1964. While at the Treasury, Professor Asa Briggs invited Carswell to deliver a series of lectures in 1963 at the University of Sussex on the European context of the English Revolution of 1688. These later formed the basis for his book The Descent on England. In 1964, he became Under-secretary in the Office of the Lord President of the Council and Minister for Science. Later the same year he transferred to become Under-secretary at the Department of Education and Science and Ministry of Health, remaining until 1974. He was Secretary to the University Grants Committee from 1974 until 1977, and his last appointment was as Secretary of the British Academy for five years, 1978 to 1983.

He was a member of the Garrick Club.

== Publications ==
=== Books ===
- The Prospector: being the life and times of Rudolf Erich Raspe (1737–1794), 1950 [about the creator of the famous fictional Baron Munchausen character]
- The Old Cause: Three Biographical Studies in Whiggism, 1954
- The South Sea Bubble, 1960, 2nd edition 1993
- The Diary and Political Papers of George Bubb Dodington (ed with L. A. Dralle), 1965
- The Civil Servant and his World, 1966
- The Descent on England: A Study of the English Revolution of 1688 and its European Background, 1969
- From Revolution to Revolution: England 1688-1776, 1973
- Lives and Letters, 1978
- The Exile: a memoir of Ivy Litvinov, 1983
- Government and the Universities in Britain: Programme and Performance 1960-1980, 1986
- The Porcupine: a life of Algernon Sidney, 1989
- The Saving of Kenwood and the Northern Heights, 1992

=== Articles ===
- Algernon Sidney's 'Court Maxims': The Biographical Importance of a Transcript, in: Historical Research (HR) 62, February 1989, pp. 96–103
- Lost for words on "the heritage", letter, The Times, 8 September 1983, p. 11

He also contributed to the Times Literary Supplement and other periodicals.

== Honours ==
- Companion of the Order of the Bath, 1977
- Honorary Research Fellow, Department of History, University College London, 1983
- Life Member of the Institute of Historical Research, University of London, 1984
- Fellow of the Royal Society of Literature, 1984

== Family ==
In 1944, Carswell married Ianthe Elstob, and they had two daughters. Ianthe Elstob was the daughter of a naval officer and his wife Ivy Elstob and the stepdaughter of Irving Davis, author of the posthumous A Catalan Cookery Book: a Collection of Impossible Recipes (1969). Ianthe Carswell died in 2001. In 1957, with Sheila Jones, she had formed the National Committee for the Abolition of Nuclear Tests, which evolved into the Campaign for Nuclear Disarmament.
