= Glass Fire =

2020 wildfire in Northern California

- Part of the 2020 California wildfires
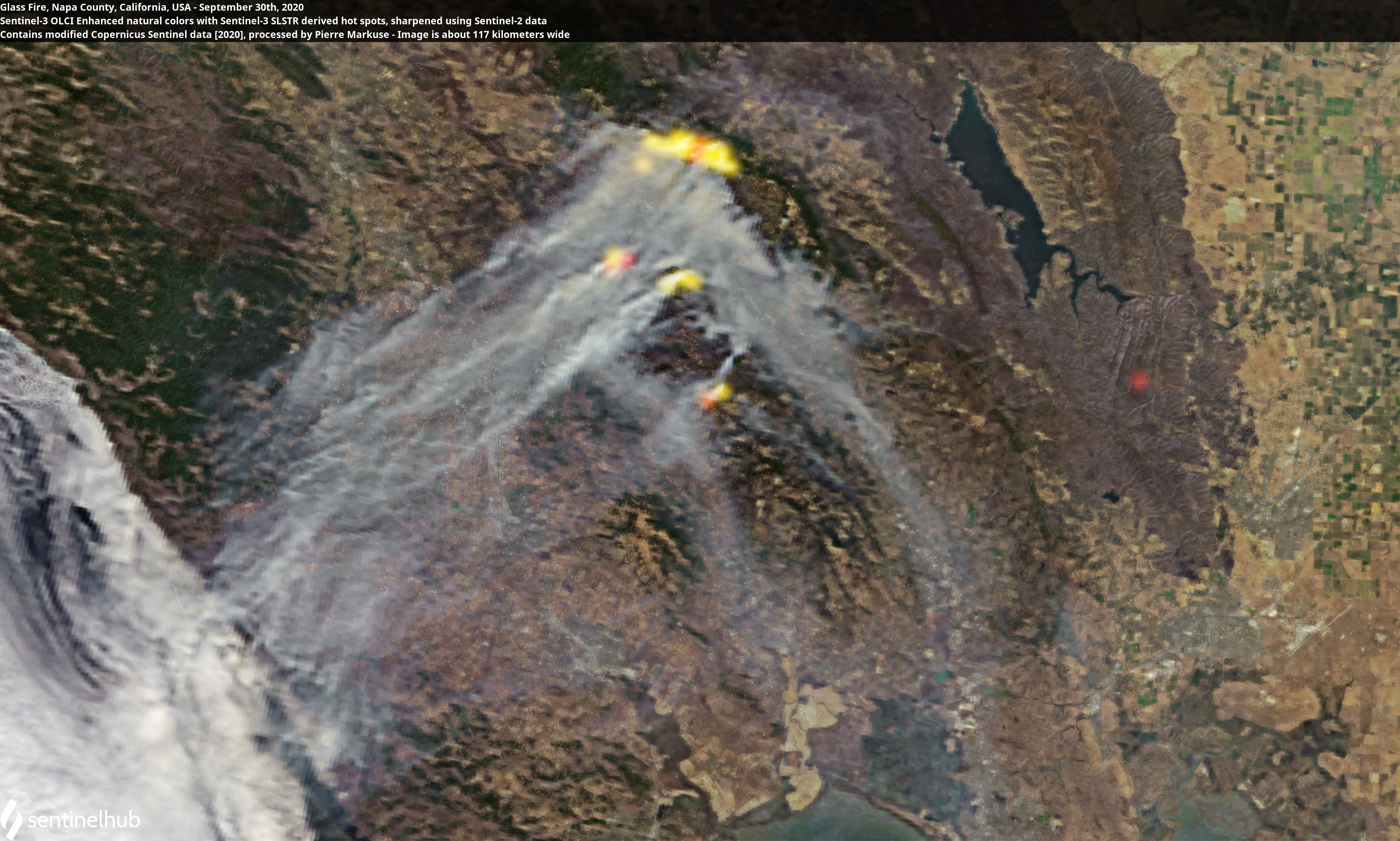
- Satellite image of the Glass Fire from space, on September 30, 2020
- Date: September 27, 2020 –; October 20, 2020
- Location: Wine Country: Napa County; Sonoma County
- Coordinates: 38°32′11.8″N 122°29′02″W

Statistics
- Total fires: 3
- Burned area: 67,484 acres (27,310 ha)

Impacts
- Structures destroyed: 1,555 destroyed

Ignition
- Cause: Under investigation (origin point is near a machine shed in Deer Park)

Map
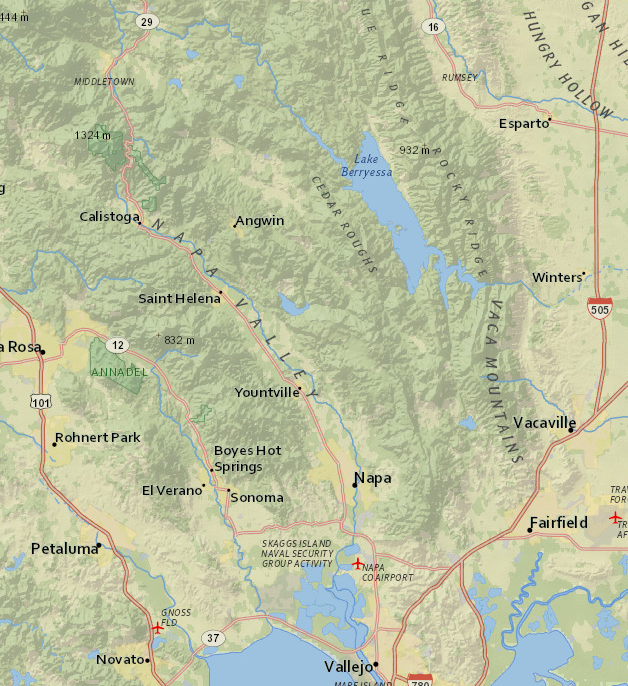
- Location within Northern California Location within Napa County

The Glass Fire was a wildfire in Northern California, that started on September 27, 2020, at 3:48 AM (PDT) from an undetermined cause and was active for 23 days. It was part of the 2020 California Wildfires and the 2020 Western United States wildfire season. The fire was named due to its origin nearby Glass Mountain Road in Deer Park, Napa County, and it extended also into Sonoma County. Initially a single 20-acre brush fire, it rapidly grew and merged with two smaller fires that expanded to 11,000 acres during the night of September 27 into September 28.

== Impact ==
The Glass Fire was fully contained on October 20, 2020, after burning over 67,484 acres and destroying 1,555 structures, including 308 homes and 343 commercial buildings in Napa County, as well as 334 homes in Sonoma County. No injuries or deaths were reported as a result of the fire. An estimated 70,000 people were under evacuation orders in the regions surrounding the Glass Fire. CAL FIRE officials lifted all remaining evacuation orders related to the fire on October 19, 2020.

Numerous structures were destroyed in Deer Park, including the Foothills Adventist Elementary School. Additionally, the fire destroyed or damaged 31 wineries, restaurants, and lodges in the region, including the famous 41-year-old Chateau Boswell Winery near St. Helena, and the 13th-century–style winery Castello di Amorosa winery near Calistoga, which lost $5 million worth of wine (based on 120,000 bottles), though its $30 million castle remains safe. California's oldest resort, the White Sulphur Springs Resort, was also destroyed. The three-Michelin-starred The Restaurant at Meadowood also burned to the ground on September 28, 2020.

Following the Glass Fire, viticulturists in the Napa Valley were uncertain about whether their grape harvests would be affected by smoke taint. Eight percent of the season's wine grapes were left unharvested as unusable.

== Response ==
More than 2,000 firefighters participated in the extinguish efforts.

Soon after the fire began, on September 27, 2020 the California Governor's Office of Emergency Services (Cal OES) secured a Fire Management Assistance Grant from the Federal Emergency Management Agency (FEMA) to help ensure the availability of vital resources to suppress the Glass Fire.

On September 28, 2020, California Governor Gavin Newsom declared the state of emergency for Napa, Sonoma and Shasta counties due to the Glass and Zogg fires ravaging the area at the time. A day later, on September 29, the Governor signed a series of bills aimed at improving the state's wildfire preparedness, supporting the mitigation efforts, and assisting victims. On October 1, 2020, Newsom visited an area in Napa county hard hit by the Glass Fire and promised at a press conference that he would seek long-term solutions to the wildfire problems facing the state.

On October 7, 2020, the California Department of Forestry and Fire Protection announced an investigation into allegations that private firefighting crews set illegal backfires to protect their clients' properties from the Glass Fire during the first week of October. This practice has sparked controversy over safety issues and unequal access to resources for private property protection.

On October 22, 2020, Governor Newsom announced that the Counties of Napa and Sonoma were added to the Presidential Major Disaster Declaration, which was initially approved by the White House on October 16, 2020 to bolster California's emergency response to wildfires across the state. The Declaration also allowed individuals who lost their home or sustained other losses due to wildfires to apply for federal assistance to help them pay for such needs as rent, home repairs, medical, dental or funeral costs, and other serious disaster-related expenses.

== Lessons ==
California Governor Gavin Newsom responding to the 2020 California wildfires and addressing defensible space policy on July 10, 2020.

On October 21, 2020, video evidence of Napa and Sonoma damaged wineries once again triggered thinking about the role of defensible space in reducing the impact of unwanted wildfire, and underscored the importance of maintaining a buffer area to reduce structural damage, such as that suffered by the wineries in Napa and Sonoma as a result of the Glass Fire. In Australia, for example, fire-prone areas were identified and combined with a Geography Information System to mitigate their negative impact on lives and infrastructures. Specific restrictions in the Building Code of Australia were also highlighted for construction inside these regions.

Regarding reconstruction in affected counties, the instructions from the California State Government suggested removing nearby vegetation and using fire-resistant building materials. Although there are studies and examples proving that fire incidents that occur in extreme weather are difficult to avoid despite defensible space policies, this will allow estate owners and firefighters to have more reaction time.

== Potential health impacts ==
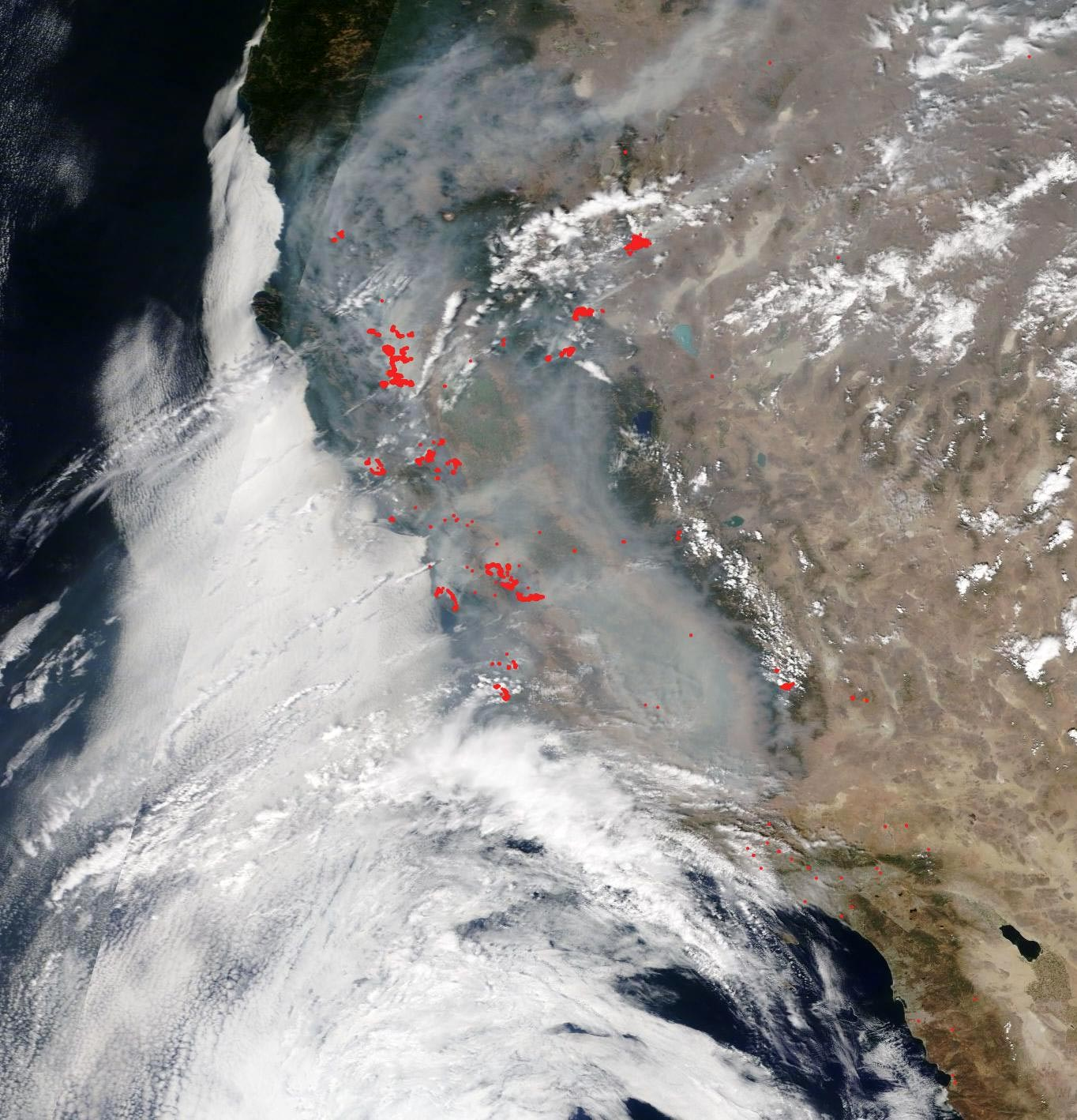
A satellite image of California covered by wildfire smoke, captured by NASA's terra satellite.

Wildfire smoke created hazardous conditions in the region in September 2020. Smoke from wildfires in Northern California polluted the air, with air quality index readings reaching 170, well above the threshold considered “unhealthy” air quality.

Exposure to wildfire smoke can have adverse effects on human health, including lung capacity development among children. According to the U.S. Environmental Protection Agency (EPA), those with an existing respiratory illness, cardiovascular disease or diabetes, as well as seniors, children, and pregnant women, are at higher risk of health complications when exposed to wildfire smoke. Stanford University researchers estimate that approximately 3,000 deaths in August and September 2020 in California can be attributed to exposure to wildfire smoke, especially among seniors with pre-existing conditions.

Exposure to wildfire smoke also takes a toll on healthcare systems, with visits to emergency rooms for respiratory symptoms spiking during wildfire events. Two evacuations in five weeks of the Adventist St. Helena Hospital in Napa County forced all patients and staff to relocate, limiting access to health care.

== See also ==
- 2020 California wildfires
- Pickett Fire
