= Agnes E. Jacomb =

English novelist (1866–1949)

Agnes E. Jacomb, pseud: Agnes Elizabeth Jacomb-Hood (1866–1949) was an English novelist, born in London. She began her literary career by winning the 250-guinea prize in the Melrose First Novel Competition with The Faith of His Fathers: A Story of Some Idealists (1909). The novel was a commercial as well as a literary success. Her other novels include Johnny Lewison (1909), The Lonely Road (1911), Esther (1912) and The Fruits of the Morrow (1914).
