= White Sulphur Springs (California) =

Thermal springs

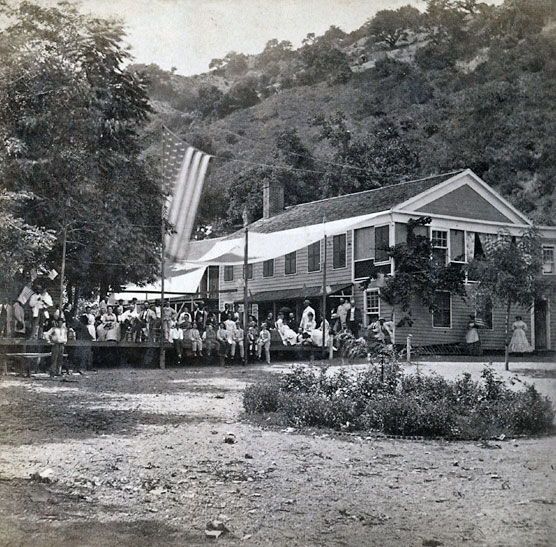
- White Sulphur Springs hotel, c. 1865
- Interactive map of White Sulphur Springs
- Location: two miles west of St. Helena, Napa County, California
- Coordinates: 38°29′4″N 122°29′9″W
- Type: geothermal
- Temperature: between 18°C (64.4°F) and 36.25°C (97.25°F) depending on source

White Sulphur Springs was considered the oldest warm mineral springs resort facility in Northern California. It was founded in 1852 in the town of St. Helena in the Napa Valley. Most of the structures at the site were destroyed in 2020 in the Glass Fire.

== History ==
Local Indigenous people historically used the warm mineral springs. Later, it became part of a Mexican Land Grant as a Rancho of California. The springs were later discovered by Dr. Edward Bale in 1848 who then opened a resort in 1852, although another account by the St. Helena Historical Society states that the springs were discovered by John York. In the 19th century well-to-do San Franciscans would travel by steamer ship across the San Francisco Bay to Soscol Landing near the town of Napa. They would then board a train and transfer to a stage coach to reach the resort. During the height of operations, the grand hotel could accommodate up to 1000 visitors. Following the 1906 San Francisco earthquake, the facilities were used to house refugees. Over the years, the property has had 30 different owners. Among its visitors were Clark Gable and Mark Twain. In the late nineteenth century into the early 20th century, the springs were used for their alleged balneotheraputic properties.

In 1968, the site was registered with the California State Office of Historic Preservation. A historical marker is at the site.

== Water profile ==
There are nine warm spring sources at the site that vary in temperature. An 1873 report by the California Department of Public Health report that the mineral content of the water consists of carbonate of lime, carbonate of magnesium, sulphate of soda, chloride of sodium, chloride of calcium, carbonate of magnesia, and sulphides of calcium and sodium. The report recorded the temperature range of the springs to be between 18 °C (64.4 °F) and 36.25 °C (97.25 °F). In 1915, the temperature of the various spring sources were reported as between 21 °C (69 °F) to 32 °C (90 °F).

== Fires ==
Over the years, the facilities burned during wildfires, and three grand hotels were lost in various fires. By 2017, the property had been converted into a retreat center for the Hoffman Institute. The conference center could hold up to 200 people. In 2020 most of the facilities were destroyed in the Glass Fire; 17 of 20 buildings were ruined.
