= Pope Valley, California =

Unincorporated community in California, United States

- Unincorporated community
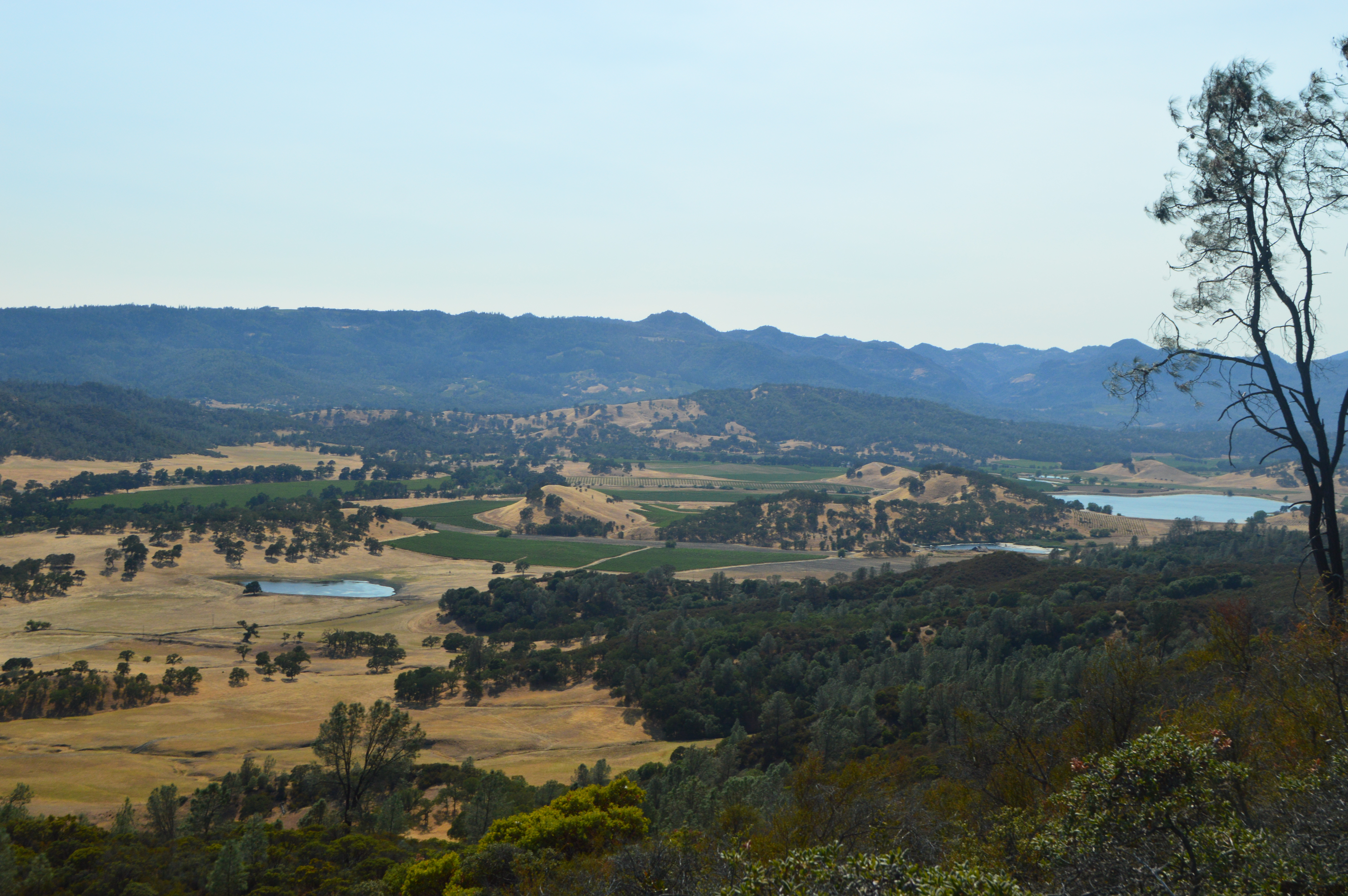
- View of Pope Valley

- Location within the state of California Pope Valley, California (the United States)
- Coordinates: 38°37′8″N 122°26′8″W
- Country: United States
- State: California
- County: Napa
- Elevation: 715 ft (218 m)
- Time zone: UTC-8 (Pacific (PST))
  - Summer (DST): UTC-7 (PDT)
- ZIP codes: 94567
- Area code: 707
- GNIS feature ID: 230940

Pope Valley is an unincorporated community located in the small valley of the same name in the Vaca Mountains and northern Napa County, California, United States.

It is east of Calistoga, north of Angwin, and borders Lake Berryessa, the second largest man-made lake in California. The zip code for Pope Valley is 94567, and the area code 707.

== History ==
Pope Valley is the home of Aetna Springs Resort, a Registered Historic Place. Pope Valley was named after William (Julian) Pope who was granted property in Rancho Locoallomi in 1841 by acting Governor Manuel Jimeno.

Academy Award winning screenwriter and Hollywood film industry pioneer Frances Marion grew up in Pope Valley and used it at the setting for her 1935 book Valley People.

In the summer of 1978, the pre-credits skydiving sequence of Moonraker was filmed above Pope Valley.

On the afternoon of July 1, 2014, a large wildfire started in the Butts Canyon area and eventually burned 4300 acres.

In August 2020, parts of Pope Valley was evacuated due to the Hennessey Fire, which resulted in the burning of over 315,000 acres (492 sq mi) in five counties, including in Pope Valley.

== Geography ==
As of 1881, limestone was being mined in the northern part of Pope Valley.

== Demographics ==
Pope Valley has a population of 583 people, with 6.5 people per square mile. There are 304 males and 279 females residing in Pope Valley and the median age is 43.

== Government ==
In the California State Legislature, Pope Valley is in the 3rd senatorial district, represented by Democrat Christopher Cabaldon, and in the 4th Assembly district, represented by Democrat Cecilia Aguiar-Curry.

In the United States House of Representatives, Pope Valley is in California's 5th congressional district, represented by Republican Tom McClintock.

== See also ==
- Mysterious Valley Airport
