= Aetna Springs Resort =

Historic resort in California, United States

- U.S. National Register of Historic Places
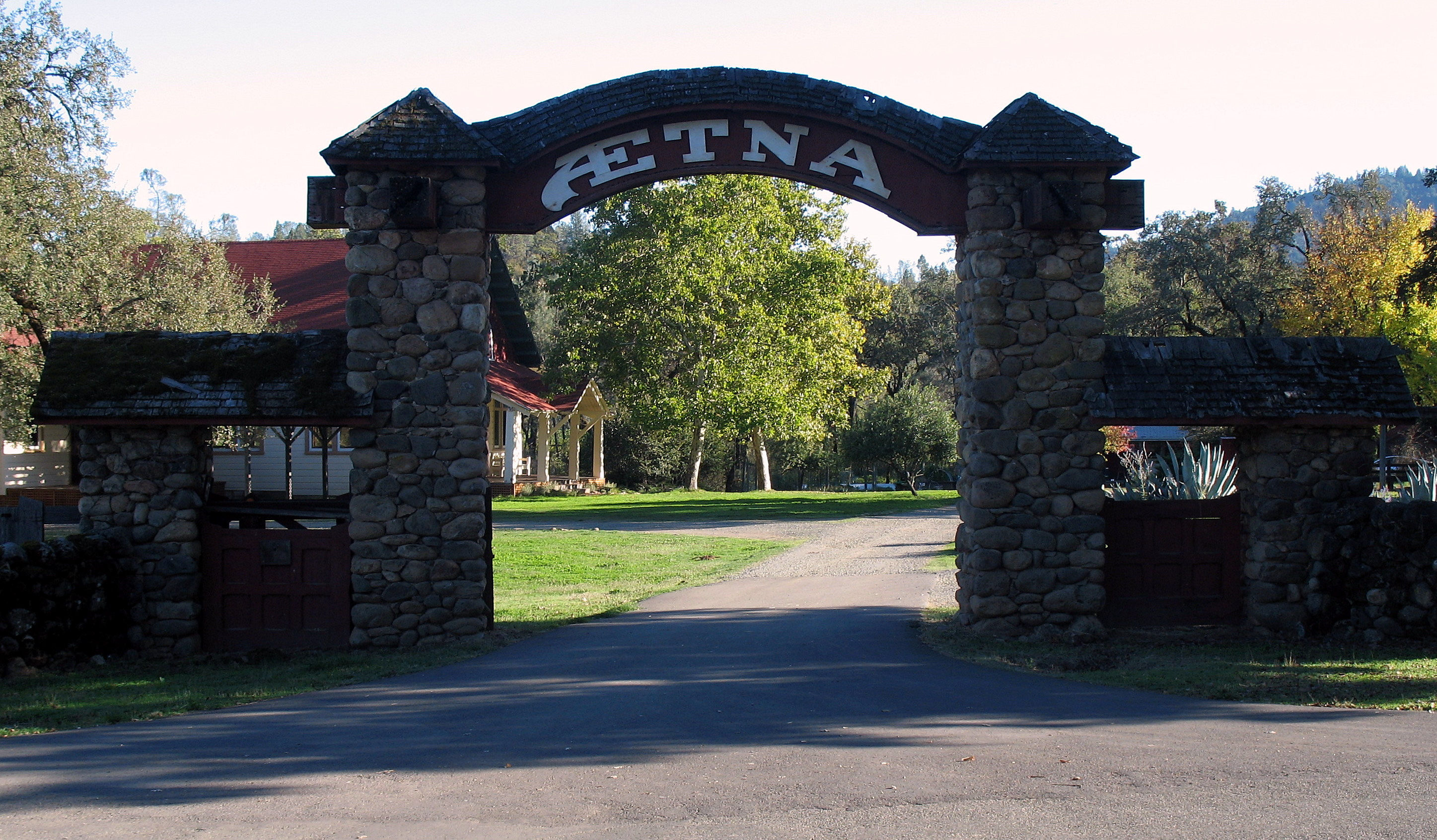
- Main gate of the resort

- Location within California
- Location: 1600 Aetna Springs Rd., Pope Valley, California
- Coordinates: 38°39′13″N 122°28′58″W
- Area: 672 acres (272 ha)
- Architect: Farr & Ward (Albert L. Farr, Joseph Francis Ward)
- NRHP reference No.: 87000341
- Added to NRHP: March 9, 1987

The Aetna Springs Resort is a historic resort located in Pope Valley in the north eastern part of Napa County, California, United States. It is listed on the National Register of Historic Places.

== Etymology ==
It was named after a nearby hot spring. The spring was so named by the owner of the Aetna Mines, John Lawley, when he discovered the spring in the 1880s.

== History ==
Aetna springs was founded by Chancellor Hartson in 1877. The resort and spa were originally developed by San Francisco advertising executive Len D. Owens who began development of the resort in 1891 after he purchased the property for $35,000 in the 1870s and quickly became a popular summertime destination for vacationers from San Francisco and Hollywood. Owens was Frances Marion's father. At one time there was a local post office in Napa County called Lidell, California that was named after William H. Lidell, the lessee of Aetna Springs.

One of the first golf courses west of the Mississippi River was built on the resort's property in 1920. George Heibel, bought the resort from Owens in 1945. In 1966 Ronald Reagan announced his intention to run for the office of Governor of California in the dining hall at the resort. Heibel sold the resort to Environmental Systems in 1972. The resort again sold in 1976 to New Educational Development Systems, a nonprofit corporation associated with the Unification Church.

On June 9, 2009 it was announced that the Aetna Springs Resort would close. Snell Valley lies to the north of Aetna Springs. In early 2012 the Napa County Planning Commission approved plans to renovate existing 28 structures and build a new lodge on the property. The resort property was sold to Alchemy Resorts in 2018. In August 2020, Aetna Springs was evacuated due to the Hennessey Fire, which resulted in the burning of over 315,000 acres (127,476 ha) in five counties, including in Aetna Springs. In 2023, it was announced that the resort will be restored as Six Senses Napa Valley, with a reopening set for 2026.

== In literature ==
Aetna Springs is the locale of Frances Marion's Valley People, a book of short stories published in 1935.

== See also ==
- Snell Creek
