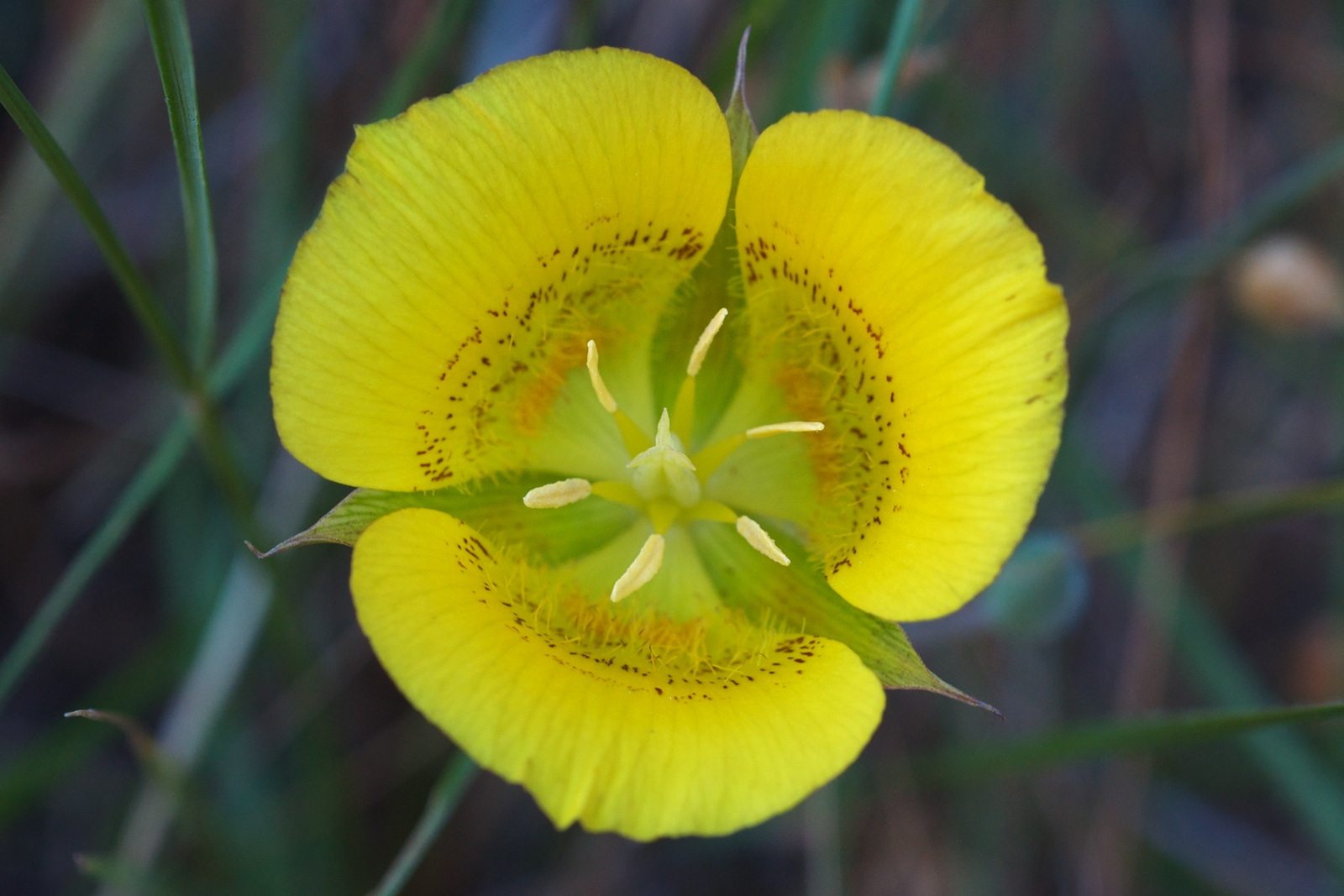
- In flower on Mount Tamalpais

Scientific classification
- Kingdom: Plantae
- Clade: Tracheophytes
- Clade: Angiosperms
- Clade: Monocots
- Order: Liliales
- Family: Liliaceae
- Genus: Calochortus
- Species: C. luteus

Binomial name
- Calochortus luteus Dougl. ex Lindl. 1833 not Nutt. 1834

Synonyms
- Cyclobothra lutea (Douglas ex Lindl.) Lindl.; Mariposa lutea (Douglas ex Lindl.) Hoover

= Calochortus luteus =

Species of flowering plant

Calochortus luteus, the yellow mariposa lily, is a mariposa lily endemic to California.

== Description ==
The primarily bright deep yellow flower is 3–5 cm across and perianth bulb-shaped, lined red-brown inside, often also with central red-brown blotch and sparse hair inside. It is a perennial herb.

== Distribution ==
This species is found on coastal prairie, grasslands and some open forest floors. Its range is along the coastal ranges from region to the northern Santa Barbara County Channel Islands and mainland, Northwestern California, the Sacramento Valley, and the Sierra Nevada foothills from there to the Tehachapi Mountains.

== Cultivation ==
Calochortus luteus is used in landscape design, with "non-habitat sourced" bulbs available from native plant nurseries and societies, to grow as an ornamental plant in gardens and for restoration projects.
