= 1792 United States House of Representatives election in Pennsylvania =

United States House of Representatives election in Pennsylvania, 1792
- October 9, 1792

All 13 Pennsylvania seats to the United States House of Representatives
	Majority party	Minority party
Party	Anti-Administration	Pro-Administration
Last election	4	4
Seats won	8	5
Seat change	▲4	▲1
Popular vote	246,466	157,338
Percentage	61.0%	39.0%

An election to the United States House of Representatives was held in Pennsylvania on October 9, 1792, for the 3rd Congress.

== Background ==
Eight representatives, 4 Pro-Administration and 4 Anti-Administration, had been elected in the previous election. In the previous election, Pennsylvania had been divided into 8 districts. Five additional seats had been apportioned to Pennsylvania after the 1790 census. All 13 seats were elected at-large, an attempt by the Pro-Administration-majority legislature of Pennsylvania to prevent the election of Anti-Administration Representatives. This backfired and an 8-5 Anti-Administration majority was elected.

== Election results ==
All 8 incumbents ran for re-election. Seven were re-elected. There were a total of 20 candidates running for the 13 seats, 11 Anti-Administration and 9 Pro-Administration (two of the Anti-Administration candidates ran on a dual ticket but are listed here as Anti-Administration)

1792 United States House election results
Anti-Administration			Pro-Administration		
William Findley (I)	33,158	8.21%	John W. Kittera (I)	29,835	7.39%
Frederick Muhlenberg (I)	32,341	8.01%	Thomas Hartley (I)	28,493	7.06%
Daniel Hiester (I)	32,147	7.96%	Thomas Fitzsimons (I)	17,997	4.46%
William Irvine	30,968	7.67%	James Armstrong	17,312	4.29%
Peter Muhlenberg	21,784	5.40%	Thomas Scott	16,657	4.13%
Andrew Gregg (I)	17,372	4.30%	Samuel Sitgreaves	15,588	3.86%
William Montgomery	17,019	4.22%	William Bingham	14,482	3.59%
John Smilie	16,754	4.15%	Henry Wynkoop	14,348	3.55%
Jonathan D. Sergeant	15,096	3.74%	Israel Jacobs (I)	2,626	0.65%
John Barclay	14,953	3.70%			
Charles Thomson	14,874	3.68%			

This was the last year in which Pennsylvania would elect all of its representatives at-large. In the following election, Pennsylvania would be divided up into 12 districts (including one plural district). At various times between 1873 and 1945, between 1 and 4 of Pennsylvania's Representatives were elected at-large, with the rest being elected from single-member districts.
