= United States House Committee on Elections =

Former congressional committee

The United States House Committee on Elections is a former standing committee of the United States House of Representatives.

Article 1, section 5, of the Constitution of the United States specifies: "Each House shall be the Judge of the Elections, Returns, and Qualifications of its own Members." The Committee on Elections was established as the first standing committee of the House to perform this function on April 13, 1789, just two weeks after the first quorum allowed the House of Representatives to organize itself. Rule number 7 of the first rules adopted by the House of Representatives specifies the character and jurisdiction of the committee:

7. A standing Committee on Elections shall be appointed, to consist of seven members, it shall be the duty of the said committee to examine and report upon the certificates of election, or other credentials of the members returned to serve in this House, and to take into their consideration all such matters as shall or may come in question, and be referred to them by the House, touching returns and elections, and to report their proceedings, with their opinion thereupon, to the House.

From 1789 until the mid-19th century the number of contested election cases remained stable at an average of three per Congress. After the 34th Congress (1855–57) the number of contested seats rose sporadically to a peak of 38 during the 54th Congress (1895–97). In 1895, due to the increase in workload, the committee was split into three separate committees: Elections #1, Elections #2, and Elections #3. After 1935 the number of contested elections returned to an average of three per Congress, and in 1947 the three Elections Committees were abolished and their jurisdiction included in that of the new House Administration Committee.

In November 2018, Nancy Pelosi announced her intention to restore the Elections Subcommittee of the Committee on House Administration in the 116th Congress and name Congresswoman Marcia L. Fudge the Chair.

== Historical committee rosters ==
=== 1st Congress ===
==== 1st session ====
Majority (Pro-Administration)	Minority (Anti-Administration)
George Clymer, Pennsylvania, chairman; Fisher Ames, Massachusetts; Egbert Benson, New York; Daniel Carroll, Maryland; Nicholas Gilman, New Hampshire; Benjamin Huntington, Connecticut; Alexander White, Virginia	none

==== 2nd session ====
Majority (Pro-Administration)	Minority (Anti-Administration)
Fisher Ames, Massachusetts, chairman; Egbert Benson, New York; Roger Sherman, Connecticut; Thomas Sinnickson, New Jersey; Alexander White, Virginia; Henry Wynkoop, Pennsylvania	Michael Jenifer Stone, Maryland

=== 2nd Congress ===
==== 1st session ====
Majority (Pro-Administration)	Minority (Anti-Administration)
Samuel Livermore, New Hampshire, chairman; Elias Boudinot, New Jersey; John Steele, North Carolina; Benjamin Bourne, Rhode Island; James Hillhouse, Connecticut	Elbridge Gerry, Massachusetts; William Branch Giles, Virginia

=== 3rd Congress ===
==== 1st session ====
Majority (Anti-Administration)	Minority (Pro-Administration)
Nathaniel Macon, North Carolina; William Irvine, Pennsylvania	William Loughton Smith, South Carolina, chairman; Richard Bland Lee, Virginia; Shearjashub Bourne, Massachusetts; Jonathan Dayton, New Jersey; James Gordon, New York

==== 2nd session ====
Majority (Anti-Administration)	Minority (Pro-Administration)
Nathaniel Macon, North Carolina; John Hunter, South Carolina; John Samuel Sherburne, New Hampshire	Jonathan Dayton, New Jersey, chairman; Richard Bland Lee, Virginia; James Hillhouse, Connecticut; George Dent, Maryland

=== 4th Congress ===
==== 1st session ====
Majority (Democratic-Republican)	Minority (Federalist)
Abraham B. Venable, Virginia, chairman; Thomas Blount, North Carolina; Henry Dearborn, Massachusetts	John W. Kittera, Pennsylvania; George Dent, Maryland; Zephaniah Swift, Connecticut; Robert Goodloe Harper, South Carolina

==== 2nd session ====
Majority (Democratic-Republican)	Minority (Federalist)
Abraham B. Venable, Virginia, chairman; Thomas Blount, North Carolina; Frederick Muhlenberg, Pennsylvania; Henry Dearborn, Massachusetts	George Dent, Maryland; Zephaniah Swift, Connecticut; Abiel Foster, New Hampshire

=== 5th Congress ===
==== 1st session ====
Majority (Federalist)	Minority (Democratic-Republican)
Joshua Coit, Connecticut, chairman; Thomas Hartley, Pennsylvania; George Dent, Maryland; John Williams, New York	Abraham Baldwin, Georgia; Carter Bassett Harrison, Virginia; Joseph Bradley Varnum, Massachusetts

==== 2nd session ====
Majority (Federalist)	Minority (Democratic-Republican)
Joshua Coit, Connecticut, chairman; Thomas Hartley, Pennsylvania; George Dent, Maryland; John Williams, New York; Thomas Evans, Virginia	Abraham Baldwin, Georgia; Joseph Bradley Varnum, Massachusetts

==== 3rd session ====
Majority (Federalist)	Minority (Democratic-Republican)
John W. Kittera, Pennsylvania; George Dent, Maryland; Chauncey Goodrich, Connecticut; John Williams, New York	Joseph Bradley Varnum, Massachusetts, chairman; Abraham Baldwin, Georgia; Anthony New, Virginia

=== 6th Congress ===
==== 1st session ====
Majority (Federalist)	Minority (Democratic-Republican)
Samuel W. Dana, Connecticut, chairman; John W. Kittera, Pennsylvania; Anthony New, Virginia; William Gordon, New Hampshire; Archibald Henderson, North Carolina	Thomas Sumter, South Carolina; Theodorus Bailey, New York

==== 2nd session ====
Majority (Federalist)	Minority (Democratic-Republican)
George Dent, Maryland, chairman; Thomas Evans, Virginia; William Edmond, Connecticut; Joseph Dickson, North Carolina; Lemuel Williams, Massachusetts	Peter Muhlenberg, Pennsylvania; William C. C. Claiborne, Tennessee

=== 7th Congress ===
==== 1st session ====
Majority (Democratic-Republican)	Minority (Federalist)
John Milledge, Georgia, chairman; John A. Hanna, Pennsylvania; John Condit, New Jersey; John Taliaferro, Virginia	John Dennis, Maryland; Samuel Tenney, New Hampshire; John Stanly, North Carolina

==== 2nd session ====
Majority (Democratic-Republican)	Minority (Federalist)
John Bacon, Massachusetts, chairman; Anthony New, Virginia; John Condit, New Jersey; Ebenezer Elmer, New Jersey	John Dennis, Maryland; Samuel Tenney, New Hampshire; John Stanly, North Carolina

=== 8th Congress ===
==== 1st session ====
Majority (Democratic-Republican)	Minority (Federalist)
William Findley, Pennsylvania, chairman; Joseph Bradley Varnum, Massachusetts; Matthew Clay, Virginia; William Kennedy, North Carolina	Calvin Goddard, Connecticut; Samuel Hunt, New Hampshire; Henry W. Livingston, New York

==== 2nd session ====
Majority (Democratic-Republican)	Minority (Federalist)
William Findley, Pennsylvania, chairman; Joseph Bradley Varnum, Massachusetts; Ebenezer Elmer, New Jersey; John Wayles Eppes, Virginia; William Kennedy, North Carolina	Henry W. Livingston, New York; Clifton Clagett, New Hampshire

=== 9th Congress ===
==== 1st session ====
Majority (Democratic-Republican)	Minority (Federalist)
William Findley, Pennsylvania, chairman; Ebenezer Elmer, New Jersey; John Wayles Eppes, Virginia; Barnabas Bidwell, Massachusetts; Martin G. Schuneman, New York	Martin Chittenden, Vermont; Caleb Ellis, New Hampshire

=== 10th Congress ===
==== 1st and 2nd sessions ====
Majority (Democratic-Republican)	Minority (Federalist)
William Findley, Pennsylvania, chairman; Matthew Clay, Virginia; John Blake Jr., New York; John Lambert, New Jersey; David Rogerson Williams, South Carolina	James Elliot, Vermont; Lewis B. Sturges, Connecticut

=== 11th Congress ===
==== 1st and 2nd sessions ====
Majority (Democratic-Republican)	Minority (Federalist)
William Findley, Pennsylvania, chairman; Matthew Clay, Virginia; John Taylor, South Carolina; George Troup, Georgia; Barzillai Gannett, Massachusetts	Killian K. Van Rensselaer, New York; Lewis B. Sturges, Connecticut

==== 3rd session ====
Majority (Democratic-Republican)	Minority (Federalist)
William Findley, Pennsylvania, chairman; Matthew Clay, Virginia; John Taylor, South Carolina; George Troup, Georgia	Killian K. Van Rensselaer, New York; Samuel Taggart, Massachusetts; Lewis B. Sturges, Connecticut

=== 12th Congress ===
==== 1st session ====
Majority (Democratic-Republican)	Minority (Federalist)
William Findley, Pennsylvania, chairman; Nathaniel Macon, North Carolina; George Troup, Georgia; James Fisk, Vermont; James Pleasants, Virginia	Lewis B. Sturges, Connecticut; James Emott, New York

==== 2nd session ====
Majority (Democratic-Republican)	Minority (Federalist)
William Findley, Pennsylvania, chairman; Nathaniel Macon, North Carolina; John Dawson, Virginia; Willis Alston, North Carolina; George Troup, Georgia	John Davenport, Connecticut; James Emott, New York

=== 13th Congress ===
==== 1st session ====
Majority (Democratic-Republican)	Minority (Federalist)
James Fisk, Vermont, chairman; William A. Burwell, Virginia; William Anderson, Pennsylvania; Daniel Avery, New York; Lewis Condict, New Jersey	John Davenport, Connecticut; Timothy Pickering, Massachusetts

==== 2nd session ====
Majority (Democratic-Republican)	Minority (Federalist)
James Fisk, Vermont, chairman; Thomas Gholson Jr., Virginia; William Anderson, Pennsylvania; William R. King, North Carolina; Israel Pickens, North Carolina; Oliver C. Comstock, New York	Roger Vose, New Hampshire

==== 3rd session ====
Majority (Democratic-Republican)	Minority (Federalist)
James Fisk, Vermont, chairman; Willis Alston, North Carolina; William Anderson, Pennsylvania; Oliver C. Comstock, New York; Thomas K. Harris, Tennessee	Charles Goldsborough, Maryland; Roger Vose, New Hampshire

=== 14th Congress ===
==== 1st session ====
Majority (Democratic-Republican)	Minority (Federalist)
John W. Taylor, New York, chairman; William Piper, Pennsylvania; Solomon P. Sharp, Kentucky; Philip P. Barbour, Virginia	Lyman Law, Connecticut; Timothy Pickering, Massachusetts; Roger Vose, New Hampshire

==== 2nd session ====
Majority (Democratic-Republican)	Minority (Federalist)
John W. Taylor, New York, chairman; John Hahn; Isaac Thomas, Tennessee; John Kerr, Virginia	Lyman Law, Connecticut; Timothy Pickering, Massachusetts; Roger Vose, New Hampshire

=== 15th Congress ===
==== 1st session ====
Majority (Democratic-Republican)	Minority (Federalist)
John W. Taylor, New York, chairman; John Tyler, Virginia; Orsamus Cook Merrill, Vermont; Henry Shaw, Massachusetts	John Linscom Boss Jr., Rhode Island; Solomon Strong, Massachusetts; Ezekiel Whitman, Massachusetts

==== 2nd session ====
Majority (Democratic-Republican)	Minority (Federalist)
John W. Taylor, New York, chairman; Orsamus Cook Merrill, Vermont; Henry Shaw, Massachusetts; Alexander Smyth, Virginia; Christian Tarr, Pennsylvania	John Linscom Boss Jr., Rhode Island; Ezekiel Whitman, Massachusetts

=== 16th Congress ===
==== 1st session ====
Majority (Democratic-Republican)	Minority (Federalist)
John W. Taylor, New York, chairman; Orsamus Cook Merrill, Vermont; Christian Tarr, Pennsylvania; Starling Tucker, South Carolina; William Brown, Kentucky; John Sloane, Ohio	Ezekiel Whitman, Massachusetts

==== 2nd session ====
Majority (Democratic-Republican)	Minority (Federalist)
John W. Taylor, New York, chairman; Christian Tarr, Pennsylvania; Starling Tucker, South Carolina; Charles Hooks, North Carolina; Robert Clark, New York; John Sloane, Ohio; Thomas Love Moore, Virginia	none

=== 17th Congress ===
==== 1st session ====
Majority (Democratic-Republican)	Minority (Federalist)
John Sloane, Ohio, chairman; Weldon Nathaniel Edwards, North Carolina; Starling Tucker, South Carolina; Thomas Jones Rogers, Pennsylvania; Thomas Love Moore, Virginia; John Speed Smith, Kentucky; Reuben H. Walworth, New York	none

==== 2nd session ====
Majority (Democratic-Republican)	Minority (Federalist)
John Sloane, Ohio, chairman; Weldon Nathaniel Edwards, North Carolina; Starling Tucker, South Carolina; Thomas Jones Rogers, Pennsylvania; Rollin Carolas Mallary, Vermont; Thomas Love Moore, Virginia	Joseph Kirkland, New York

=== 18th Congress ===
==== 1st session ====
Majority (Democratic-Republican)	Minority (Federalist)
John Sloane, Ohio, chairman; William Lee Ball, Virginia; Thomas H. Hall, North Carolina; Starling Tucker, South Carolina; Rollin Carolas Mallary, Vermont; James Israel Standifer, Tennessee; Philip Thompson, Kentucky	none

==== 2nd session ====
Majority (Democratic-Republican)	Minority (Federalist)
John Sloane, Ohio, chairman; Thomas H. Hall, North Carolina; Starling Tucker, South Carolina; Daniel H. Miller, Pennsylvania; James Israel Standifer, Tennessee; Philip Thompson, Kentucky; John Taliaferro, Virginia	none

=== 19th Congress ===
==== 1st session ====
Majority (Anti-Jacksonian)	Minority (Jacksonian)
John Sloane, Ohio, chairman; Moses Hayden, New York; Elisha Phelps, Connecticut; Alfred H. Powell, Virginia	Starling Tucker, South Carolina; John Heritage Bryan, North Carolina; Michael Hoffman, New York

==== 2nd session ====
Majority (Anti-Jacksonian)	Minority (Jacksonian)
John Sloane, Ohio, chairman; Moses Hayden, New York; Elisha Phelps, Connecticut	Willis Alston, North Carolina; Starling Tucker, South Carolina; Nathaniel Claiborne, Virginia; Michael Hoffman, New York

=== 20th Congress ===
==== 1st session ====
Majority (Jacksonian)	Minority (Anti-Jacksonian)
Willis Alston, North Carolina; Starling Tucker, South Carolina; John Anderson, Maine; Nathaniel Claiborne, Virginia; John G. Stower, New York	John Sloane, Ohio, chairman; Elisha Phelps, Connecticut

==== 2nd session ====
Majority (Jacksonian)	Minority (Anti-Jacksonian)
John Anderson, Maine, chairman; Willis Alston, North Carolina; Nathaniel Claiborne, Virginia; John G. Stower, New York	Elisha Phelps, Connecticut; John Davenport, Ohio; James F. Randolph, New Jersey

=== 21st Congress ===
==== 1st and 2nd sessions ====
Majority (Jacksonian)	Minority (Anti-Jacksonian)
Willis Alston, North Carolina, chairman; Starling Tucker, South Carolina; Nathaniel Claiborne, Virginia; Nicholas D. Coleman, Kentucky; Cave Johnson, Tennessee	James F. Randolph, New Jersey; Thomas Beekman, New York

=== 22nd Congress ===
==== 1st and 2nd sessions ====
Majority (Jacksonian)	Minority (Anti-Jacksonian)
Nathaniel Claiborne, Virginia, chairman; Cornelius Holland, Maine; Lauchlin Bethune, North Carolina	James F. Randolph, New Jersey; Thomas Dickens Arnold, Tennessee; John A. Collier, New York; John K. Griffin, South Carolina

=== 23rd Congress ===
==== 1st session ====
Majority (Jacksonian)	Minority (Anti-Jacksonian)
Nathaniel Claiborne, Virginia, chairman; Micajah Thomas Hawkins, North Carolina; Thomas L. Hamer, Ohio; Seaborn Jones, Georgia; Balie Peyton, Tennessee; Aaron Vanderpoel, New York	John Banks, Pennsylvania; John K. Griffin, South Carolina; Edward A. Hannegan, Indiana

==== 2nd session ====
Majority (Jacksonian)	Minority (Anti-Jacksonian)
Nathaniel Claiborne, Virginia, chairman; Micajah Thomas Hawkins, North Carolina; Robert Burns, New Hampshire; Aaron Vanderpoel, New York; James Bouldin, Virginia; Daniel Kilgore, Ohio	John K. Griffin, South Carolina; Edward A. Hannegan, Indiana; Gideon Hard, New York
