= John Richards (Pennsylvania politician) =

American politician

John Richards (April 18, 1753 – November 13, 1822) was a United States representative from Pennsylvania.

== Early life and education ==
Born in New Hanover, he was educated under private tutors.

== Career ==
Richards was appointed as a magistrate during the Revolutionary War. He was appointed justice of the peace for Philadelphia County, Pennsylvania on June 6, 1777, a position he held until his death.

He also served as judge of the Montgomery County Court of Common Pleas in 1784, and was a delegate to the Federal Constitutional Convention of 1787.

Richards was elected as a Democratic-Republican Party to the Fourth Congress, serving from January 18, 1796 to March 3, 1797. He presented a memorial on December 10, 1795, claiming election since the governor had declined to issue a certificate to either candidate. The committee of election reported that James Morris had been duly elected, but died subsequent to the election so that the seat had become vacant. This report was recommitted and subsequently a resolution was reported that John Richards was entitled to the seat, which was adopted by the House on January 18, 1796, and Mr. Richards took his seat the same day. He was not a candidate for renomination in 1796.

He was elected to the Pennsylvania State Senate (1801 to 1807).

An ironmaster, Richards also engaged in mercantile and agricultural pursuits. He died in New Hanover; interment was in Faulkner Swamp (Lutheran) Church Cemetery.

Matthias Richards, John's younger brother, was also a U.S. Representative from Pennsylvania.

U.S. House of Representatives
| Preceded by At large on a General ticket: Thomas Fitzsimons; John W. Kittera; Thomas Hartley; Thomas Scott; James Armstrong; Peter G. Muhlenberg; Andrew Gregg; Frederick A.C. Muhlenberg; Daniel Hiester; William Irvine; William Findley; John Smilie and William Montgomery | Member of the U.S. House of Representatives from Pennsylvania's 4th congressional district 1796–1797 alongside: Samuel Sitgreaves | Succeeded by John Chapman and Samuel Sitgreaves |
