= David Bard =

American politician

David Bard (1744 – March 12, 1815) was a United States representative from Pennsylvania. Born at Carroll's Delight in Adams County, Pennsylvania, he graduated from Princeton College (New Jersey) in 1773.

He studied theology and was licensed to preach by the Donegal Presbytery in 1777. He was ordained to the Presbyterian ministry at Lower Conotheague in 1779, and was a missionary in Virginia and west of the Allegheny Mountains. From 1786 to 1789, he was a pastor at Bedford, Pennsylvania, and later at Frankstown (now Hollidaysburg, Pennsylvania).

Bard was elected as a Democratic-Republican to the Fourth and Fifth Congresses, serving from March 4, 1795, to March 3, 1799.

He was elected as a Republican to the Eighth and to the six succeeding Congresses and served from March 4, 1803, until his death in Alexandria, Pennsylvania. He was interred in Sinking Valley Cemetery, near the hamlet of Arch Spring.

== See also ==
- List of members of the United States Congress who died in office (1790–1899)

U.S. House of Representatives
Preceded by At large on a general ticket: Thomas Fitzsimons; John W. Kittera; Thomas Hartley; Thomas Scott; James Armstrong; Peter G. Muhlenberg; Andrew Gregg; Frederick A.C. Muhlenberg; Daniel Hiester; William Irvine; William Findley; John Smilie and William Montgomery	Member of the U.S. House of Representatives from Pennsylvania's 10th congressional district 1795–1799	Succeeded by Henry Woods
Preceded by Isaac Van Horne and Robert Brown	Member of the U.S. House of Representatives from Pennsylvania's 4th congressional district 1803–1805 alongside John Andre Hanna; 1805–1813 alongside Robert Whitehill	Succeeded by Hugh Glasgow
Preceded by Isaac Griffin	Member of the U.S. House of Representatives from Pennsylvania's 9th congressional district 1813–1815	Succeeded by Thomas Burnside
