= Daniel Hiester =

American politician (1747–1804)

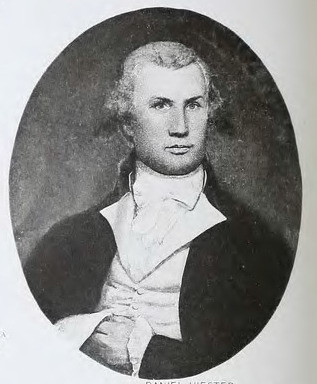

Member of the U.S. House of Representatives
- In office March 4, 1801 – March 7, 1804
- Preceded by: George Baer Jr.
- Succeeded by: Roger Nelson
- Constituency: Maryland 4th
- In office March 4, 1789 – July 1, 1796
- Preceded by: District created
- Succeeded by: George Ege
- Constituency: Pennsylvania at-large (1789–1795); Pennsylvania 5th (1795–1796)

Member of the Supreme Executive Council of Pennsylvania from Montgomery County
- In office October 15, 1784 – October 24, 1785
- Preceded by: Position created
- Succeeded by: Peter Muhlenberg

Personal details
- Born: June 25, 1747 Berks County, Province of Pennsylvania, British America
- Died: March 7, 1804 (aged 56) Washington, D.C., U.S.
- Party: Anti-Administration; Democratic-Republican

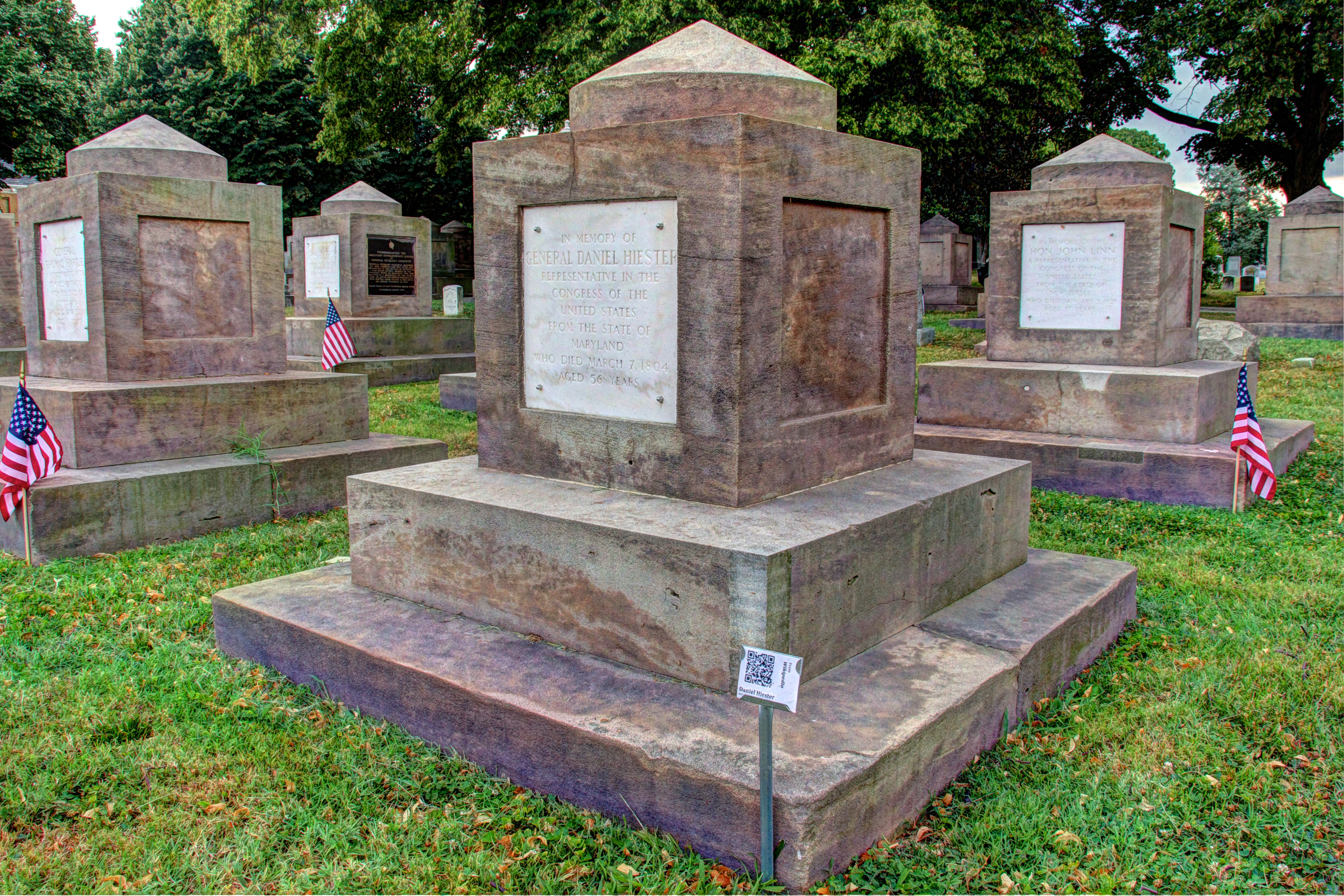
Hiester's cenotaph at the Congressional Cemetery, Washington D.C.

Daniel Hiester (June 25, 1747 – March 7, 1804) was an American political and military leader from the Revolutionary War period to the early 19th Century. Born in Berks County in the Province of Pennsylvania, he was a member of the Hiester Family political dynasty. He was the brother of John Hiester and Gabriel Hiester, cousin of Joseph Hiester, and the uncle of William Hiester and U.S. Rep. Daniel Hiester (1774–1834).

== Biography ==
Hiester's father, also named Daniel Hiester, emigrated from Elsoff (now in Getmany) in 1737 and settled in Goshenhoppen (now Bally), Pennsylvania, afterward purchasing a tract of several thousand acres in Berks County. After completing his education, the young Hiester engaged in the mercantile business in Montgomery County, Pennsylvania. He owned slaves as well.

During the American Revolution, Hiester served as a colonel and later a brigadier general of the Pennsylvania Militia. He was a member of the Pennsylvania General Assembly from 1778 to 1781. In 1784 he was elected to the supreme executive council of Pennsylvania, and later in 1787 he was appointed as a commissioner to negotiate the Connecticut land claims dispute.

Hiester was elected to the United States House of Representatives representing Pennsylvania, serving from March 4, 1789, until his resignation on July 1, 1796. He then moved to Hagerstown, Maryland, and was again elected to the House representing Maryland, serving from March 4, 1801, until his death in Washington, D.C., on March 7, 1804. He was among the number that voted to move the U.S. capital from Philadelphia to a place on the Potomac later named Washington, D.C.

He was buried in Zion Reformed Graveyard in Hagerstown, Maryland and has a cenotaph at the Congressional Cemetery in Washington.

== See also ==
- List of members of the United States Congress who died in office (1790–1899)

== Notes ==
Political offices
Preceded by position created	Member, Supreme Executive Council of Pennsylvania, representing Montgomery County; October 15, 1784 – October 24, 1785	Succeeded by Peter Muhlenberg
U.S. House of Representatives
Preceded by District Created	Member of the U.S. House of Representatives from Pennsylvania's at-large congressional district 1789–1791 alongside: George Clymer, Thomas Fitzsimons, Thomas Hartley, Thomas Scott, Henry Wynkoop, Frederick A.C. Muhlenberg and Peter G. Muhlenberg 1791–1793 alongside: Thomas Fitzsimons, Thomas Hartley, Israel Jacobs, John W. Kittera, Frederick A.C. Muhlenberg, William Findley, and Andrew Gregg; 1793–1795 alongside: Thomas Fitzsimons, John W. Kittera, Thomas Hartley, Thomas Scott, James Armstrong, Peter G. Muhlenberg, Andrew Gregg, Frederick A.C. Muhlenberg, William Irvine, William Findley, John Smilie, and William Montgomery	Succeeded by 1st: John Swanwick; 2nd: Frederick A.C. Muhlenberg; 3rd: Richard Thomas; 4th: Samuel Sitgreaves and John Richards; 5th: Daniel Hiester; 6th: John Andre Hanna; 7th: John W. Kittera; 8th: Thomas Hartley; 9th: Andrew Gregg; 10th: David Bard and Samuel Maclay; 11th: William Findley 12th: Albert Gallatin
Preceded by At large on a General ticket: Thomas Fitzsimons; John W. Kittera; Thomas Hartley; Thomas Scott; James Armstrong; Peter G. Muhlenberg; Andrew Gregg; Daniel Hiester; Frederick A.C. Muhlenberg; William Irvine; William Findley; John Smilie and William Montgomery	Member of the U.S. House of Representatives from Pennsylvania's 5th congressional district 1795–1796	Succeeded by George Ege
Preceded by George Baer, Jr.	Member of the U.S. House of Representatives from Maryland's 4th congressional district 1801–1804	Succeeded by Roger Nelson
