= Thomas Scott (Pennsylvania politician) =

American politician

Thomas Scott (c. 1739 – March 2, 1796) was an American lawyer and politician who was born in the Province of Pennsylvania. Following the American Revolution, he became a member of the first Pennsylvania Assembly in 1776, and helped to craft the first laws of the Commonwealth of Pennsylvania.

== Biography ==
Born in what is now Chester County, Pennsylvania in about 1739, Scott opted to study law while still young. Following his admission to the bar and subsequent practice of law, he moved to the area known today as Brownsville in Fayette County and settled on Dunlaps Creek at Redstone Old Fort circa 1770.

In 1773, he was appointed as a justice of the peace; in 1776, he was a member of the first Pennsylvania Assembly.

After Washington County was established on March 28, 1781, he was appointed as the first prothonotary. He served in that capacity until March 28, 1789, when he resigned in order to accept his elected position with the U.S. House of Representatives. He took that seat on Wednesday, April 1, 1789, which was the opening of the first session of the first Congress in the city of New York. Among his contributions, he purportedly had the honor of presenting to the Congress of the new nation a resolution that established the capital city on the banks of the Potomac River now known as Washington, D.C. He was one of nine representatives to vote against the Eleventh Amendment to the United States Constitution.

== Death and interment ==
Scott died on March 2, 1796, and was buried in the Old Graveyard in the city of Washington, Pennsylvania, on Walnut Street which is now considered to be the present site of Washington & Jefferson College. During the early 1900s, his body was exhumed and re-interred in the Washington Cemetery.

| Preceded by John Proctor | Member, Supreme Executive Council of Pennsylvania, representing Westmoreland County; 29 November 1777 – 17 February 1781 | Succeeded by Christopher Hayes |
U.S. House of Representatives
| Preceded by District Created | Member of the U.S. House of Representatives from Pennsylvania's at-large congressional district 1789–1791 alongside: George Clymer, Thomas Fitzsimons, Thomas Hartley, Frederick A.C. Muhlenberg, Henry Wynkoop, Daniel Hiester and Peter G. Muhlenberg | Succeeded by Frederick A.C. Muhlenberg, Thomas Fitzsimons, Thomas Hartley, Israel Jacobs, John W. Kittera, Daniel Hiester, William Findley, and Andrew Gregg |
| Preceded by Frederick A.C. Muhlenberg, Thomas Fitzsimons, Thomas Hartley, Israel Jacobs, John W. Kittera, Daniel Hiester, William Findley, and Andrew Gregg | Member of the U.S. House of Representatives from Pennsylvania's at-large congressional district 1793–1795 alongside: Thomas Fitzsimons, John W. Kittera, Thomas Hartley, Frederick A.C. Muhlenberg, James Armstrong, Peter G. Muhlenberg, Andrew Gregg, Daniel Hiester, William Irvine, William Findley, John Smilie, and William Montgomery | Succeeded by 1st: John Swanwick; 2nd: Frederick A.C. Muhlenberg; 3rd: Richard Thomas; 4th: Samuel Sitgreaves and John Richards; 5th: Daniel Hiester; 6th: John Andre Hanna; 7th: John W. Kittera; 8th: Thomas Hartley; 9th: Andrew Gregg; 10th: David Bard and Samuel Maclay; 11th: William Findley 12th: Albert Gallatin |
