= Thomas Fitzsimons =

American Founding Father and politician (1741–1811)

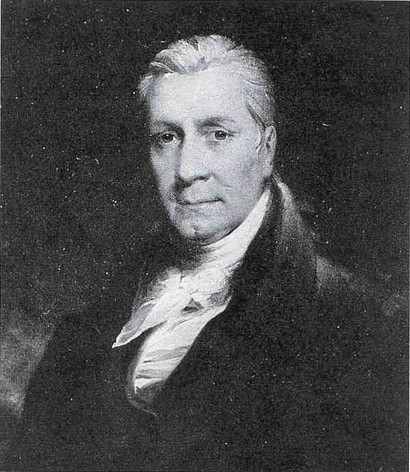

Member of the U.S. House of Representatives from Pennsylvania's At-large district
- In office March 4, 1789 – March 3, 1795
- Preceded by: (district created)
- Succeeded by: John Swanwick; Frederick A.C. Muhlenberg; Richard Thomas; Samuel Sitgreaves and John Richards; Daniel Hiester; John Andre Hanna; John W. Kittera; Thomas Hartley; Andrew Gregg; David Bard and Samuel Maclay; William Findley; Albert Gallatin

Personal details
- Born: October 1741 Kingdom of Ireland
- Died: August 26, 1811 (aged 69) Philadelphia, Pennsylvania, U.S.
- Resting place: St. Mary's, Philadelphia
- Party: Pro-Administration
- Occupation: Statesman, merchant, soldier
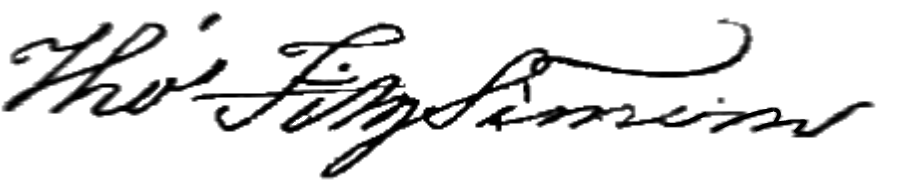
- Signature

Thomas Fitzsimons (October 1741 – August 26, 1811) was an Irish-born American Founding Father, merchant, banker, and politician. A resident of Philadelphia, Fitzsimons represented Pennsylvania in the Continental Congress, was a delegate to Constitutional Convention, and served in U.S. Congress. He was a signatory of the Constitution of the United States. Although an owner of two slaves in 1790, Fitzsimons was an early proponent of abolishing the slave trade in the newly formed nation.

== Biography ==
Fitzsimons was born in the Kingdom of Ireland in 1741. In 1760 his family immigrated to Philadelphia. Fitzsimons had enough education that he could begin work as a clerk in a mercantile house. He married Catherine Meade on November 23, 1761, and formed a business partnership with her brother George. Their firm, which specialized in the West Indies trade, successfully operated for over 41 years.

=== Revolutionary bent ===
The firm was soon hit by the new revenue measures created to help support the finances of the Kingdom of Great Britain, including the much-reviled Stamp Act of 1765. Concerned with these ideas, Fitzsimons became active in the Irish merchant community in Philadelphia. He was a founding member of the Friendly Sons of St. Patrick in 1771 and later, in 1774, a steering committee organized to protest the Coercive Acts.

When Pennsylvania began mobilizing and organizing a militia to fight the British, Fitzsimons became involved. He served as captain of a company of home guards, which he raised under the command of Colonel John Cadwalader. Initially, his company served as part of the soldiers who manned posts along the New Jersey coast to defend against invasion. His unit later served as part of the reserve at the 1776 Battle of Trenton. Later in the war, he served on the Pennsylvania Council of Safety and headed a board to oversee the newly formed Pennsylvania Navy. Under this role, he helped organize the strategic resources of Pennsylvania and later provided supplies, ships, and money in support of Pennsylvanian and French forces.

=== Politics ===
Thomas Fitzsimons entered politics as a delegate to the Continental Congress in 1782 and 1783. He was a member of the United States House of Representatives from 1789 until 1795. He was also a delegate to the U.S. Constitutional Convention in 1787. Although not a leading member of that convention, he supported a strong national government, the end of slavery, the United States Congress's powers to impose a tariff on imports and exports, the granting of the House of Representatives, and power in equal to the United States Senate in making treaties. Based on debates had during the convention, he was not a supporter of universal suffrage. He was one of two Catholic signers of the United States Constitution, the other being Daniel Carroll of Maryland.

Fitzsimons was a supporter of the military, and he was not shy about sharing his opinion. He is known to have been open about his agreement on not dissolving the army until absolutely necessary.

After the Constitution was established, he served in the first three sessions of the House of Representatives as a Federalist, where he favored protective tariffs and a strong navy, co-drafting the 1794 law authorizing the original six frigates of the United States Navy. He was one of nine representatives to vote against the Eleventh Amendment to the United States Constitution. Fitzsimons failed to win re-election in 1794, being defeated by John Swanwick, who carried seven of Philadelphia's twelve districts with 57% of the vote. This was partially attributed to public opinion turning against the Federalist Party over the forceful suppression of the Whiskey Rebellion. Although he never held elective office again, Fitzsimons served in 1798 as head of the committee of merchants overseeing the subscription loan to build a warship at private expense for use in the Quasi-War.

In 1796, FitzSimons, along with James Innes of Virginia, was appointed by President John Adams to serve as one of two American members on the five-man debt commission charged under Article VI of the Jay Treaty with examining the claims of British subjects unable to collect debts incurred by Americans prior to the American Revolution. FitzSimons, Innes, and, Samuel Sitgreaves, who replaced Innes upon the latter's death, became annoyed with the arguments used by their three British counterparts, Thomas Macdonald, Henry Pye Rich, and John Guillemard, to inflate the claims total, and FitzSimons and Sitgreaves angrily and permanently seceded from the board in July 1799. The claims were eventually disposed of by a lump-sum payment, agreed upon by United States Minister to Britain Rufus King with British Foreign Secretary Robert Banks Jenkinson and approved by President Thomas Jefferson and the Senate in 1802.

After withdrawing from politics, Fitzsimons remained active in civic and business affairs. He served as president of Philadelphia's Chamber of Commerce, as a trustee of the University of Pennsylvania, director of the Delaware Insurance Company, and a director of the Bank of North America from 1781 to 1803. He was a founder of the bank and supported efforts to found the College of Georgetown. Fitzsimons had also helped found the Insurance Company of North America.

Fitzsimons died on August 26, 1811, in Philadelphia, where he was buried in the cemetery of St. Mary's Catholic Church.

== Legacy ==
- The Thomas FitzSimons High School was named after Thomas Fitzsimons.
- In 1946 a statue of Fitzsimons, commissioned by Friendly Sons of St. Patrick, was built in Philadelphia.
- In 1965 Samuel Edelson and Ida Edelson discovered a portrait of Thomas Fitzsimons.

U.S. House of Representatives
Preceded by District Created	Member of the U.S. House of Representatives from Pennsylvania's at-large congressional district 1789–1791 alongside: George Clymer, Frederick A.C. Muhlenberg, Thomas Hartley, Thomas Scott, Henry Wynkoop, Daniel Hiester and Peter G. Muhlenberg 1791–1793 alongside: Frederick A.C. Muhlenberg, Thomas Hartley, Israel Jacobs, John W. Kittera, Daniel Hiester, William Findley, and Andrew Gregg; 1793–1795 alongside: Frederick A.C. Muhlenberg, John W. Kittera, Thomas Hartley, Thomas Scott, James Armstrong, Peter G. Muhlenberg, Andrew Gregg, Daniel Hiester, William Irvine, William Findley, John Smilie, and William Montgomery	Succeeded by 1st: John Swanwick; 2nd: Frederick A. C. Muhlenberg; 3rd: Richard Thomas; 4th: Samuel Sitgreaves and John Richards; 5th: Daniel Hiester; 6th: John Andre Hanna; 7th: John W. Kittera; 8th: Thomas Hartley; 9th: Andrew Gregg; 10th: David Bard and Samuel Maclay; 11th: William Findley 12th: Albert Gallatin
