= George Clymer =

American Founding Father and politician (1739–1813)

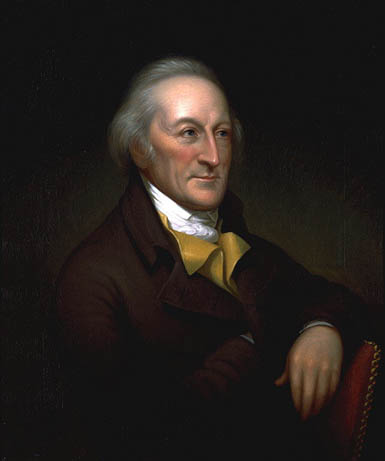
- Portrait by Charles Willson Peale, c. 1807–1810
- Born: March 16, 1739; Philadelphia, Province of Pennsylvania, British America
- Died: January 23, 1813 (aged 73); Morrisville, Pennsylvania, U.S.
- Resting place: Friends Burying Ground; Trenton, New Jersey
- Known for: Founding Father of the United States
- Spouse: Elizabeth Meredith (m. 1765)
- Children: 10

George Clymer (March 16, 1739 – January 23, 1813) was an American politician, early slavery abolitionist and Founding Father of the United States, one of only six founders who signed both the Declaration of Independence and U.S. Constitution. Clymer was among the earliest patriots to advocate for complete independence from Britain. He attended the Continental Congress and served in political office until the end of his life. He was a Framer of the Constitution where he attempted unsuccessfully to regulate the importation of slaves. Clymer was himself a minor slave owner, at least briefly when seven years old through inheritance.

== Early life and family ==
Clymer was born in Philadelphia in the Province of Pennsylvania on March 16, 1739. Orphaned when only a year old, he was apprenticed to his maternal aunt and uncle, Hannah and William Coleman, to prepare to become a merchant. He married Elizabeth Meredith on March 22, 1765. In a letter written by Clymer to the rector of Christ Church, the Reverend Richard Peters, Clymer states that he had previously fathered a child; neither the child's nor mother's name is mentioned. Clymer and his wife had nine children, four of whom died in infancy. His oldest surviving son, Henry (born 1767), married the Philadelphia socialite Mary Willing in 1794. John Meredith, Margaret, George, and Ann also survived to adulthood, though John Meredith was killed in the Whiskey Rebellion in 1787 at age 18.

== Career ==
Clymer was a patriot and leader in the demonstrations in Philadelphia resulting from the Tea Act and the Stamp Act. Clymer accepted the command as a leader of a volunteer corps belonging to General John Cadwalader's brigade. In 1759, he was inducted as a member of the original American Philosophical Society. He became a member of the Philadelphia Committee of Safety in 1773 and was elected to the Continental Congress 1776–1780. Clymer shared the responsibility of being treasurer of the Continental Congress with Michael Hillegas. He served on several committees during his first congressional term and was sent with Sampson Mathews to inspect the northern army at Fort Ticonderoga on behalf of Congress in the fall of 1776. When Congress fled Philadelphia in the face of Sir Henry Clinton's threatened occupation, Clymer stayed behind with George Walton and Robert Morris. Clymer's business ventures during and after war served to increase his wealth. In 1779 and 1780, Clymer and his son Meredith engaged in a lucrative trade with Sint Eustatius. Although not partial to the merchant business, Clymer continued in business with his father-in-law and brother-in-law until 1782.

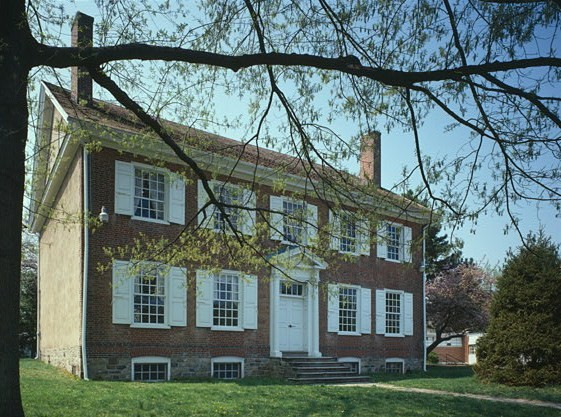
Summerseat, Clymer's home

He resigned from Congress in 1777 and in 1780 was elected to a seat in the Pennsylvania Legislature. In 1782, he was sent on a tour of the southern states in a vain attempt to get the legislatures to pay up on subscriptions due to the central government. He was re-elected to the Pennsylvania legislature in 1784 and represented his state at the Constitutional Convention in 1787. He was elected to the first U.S. Congress in 1789.

He was the first president of The Philadelphia Bank and the Pennsylvania Academy of the Fine Arts and vice-president of the Philadelphia Agricultural Society. When Congress passed a bill imposing a duty on spirits distilled in the United States in 1791, Clymer was placed as head of the excise department in the state of Pennsylvania. He was also one of the commissioners to negotiate a treaty with the Creek Indian confederacy at Colerain, Georgia on June 29, 1796. He is considered the benefactor of Indiana Borough, as it was he who donated the property for a county seat in Indiana County, Pennsylvania.

Clymer died on January 23, 1813. He was buried at the Friends Burying Ground in Trenton, New Jersey.

== Slavery ==
Clymer is known to have been a slave owner; to what degree is uncertain, although it is known his father, grandfather and brother were minor slave owners. When his father Christopher died, George, then seven years old, inherited "a negro man named Ned", who died soon after. Ned was probably the only remains of an inheritance given to Christoper from his father, Richard, George's grandfather, who owned four slaves.

Clymer, as a member of the Pennsylvania delegation during the framing of the Constitution, unsuccessfully opposed the slave trade. The question of the slave trade, i.e. the import of new slaves into the United States, was one of the most contentious issues for the framers. Clymer was on the committee to draft a Slave Trade Compromise to postpone the slave trade decision until 1808. Clymer supported an "export tax" (tariff), which was a way to indirectly tax slavery, and which like the slave trade question was opposed by southern states. Nevertheless, the tariff was included as part of the compromise.

== Legacy ==
USS George Clymer (APA-27) was named in his honor. Clymer, Indiana County, Pennsylvania, was named in his honor as was Clymer, New York. There is a George Clymer Elementary School in the School District of Philadelphia. Clymer's home in Morrisville, Pennsylvania, known as Summerseat, still stands, as does a house he owned in Philadelphia's Fairmount Park known as Ridgeland Mansion. One of the streets running alongside Summerseat in Morrisville is Clymer Avenue.

In Reading, Pennsylvania, Clymer Street is named in his honor. In the Leedom Estates section of Ridley Township, Pennsylvania, Clymer Lane is named after him.

Clymer Avenue in Indiana, Pennsylvania, is named after George Clymer.

== See also ==
- Memorial to the 56 Signers of the Declaration of Independence

U.S. House of Representatives
Preceded by District Created	Member of the U.S. House of Representatives from Pennsylvania's at-large congressional district 1789–1791 alongside: Thomas Fitzsimons, Frederick A. C. Muhlenberg, Thomas Hartley, Thomas Scott, Henry Wynkoop, Daniel Hiester and Peter G. Muhlenberg	Succeeded by At large on a general ticket: Thomas Fitzsimons, Frederick A. C. Muhlenberg, Thomas Hartley, Israel Jacobs, John W. Kittera, Daniel Hiester, William Findley, and Andrew Gregg
