= Dean of the United States House of Representatives =

Longest continuously serving U.S. representative

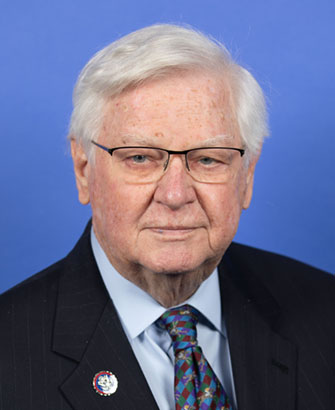
- Incumbent; Hal Rogers since March 18, 2022
- United States House of Representatives
- Member of: United States House of Representatives
- Seat: Kentucky's 5th
- First holder: Frederick Muhlenberg; March 4, 1789

The dean of the United States House of Representatives is the longest continuously serving member of the House. The current dean is Hal Rogers, a Republican from Kentucky, who has served in the House since 1981. The dean is a symbolic post, whose only customary duty is to swear in a speaker of the House after the speaker is elected. This responsibility was first recorded in 1819 but has not been observed continuously – at times, the speaker-elect was the current dean or the speaker-elect preferred to be sworn in by a member of their own party when the dean belonged to another party. The dean comes forward on the House Floor to administer the oath to the speaker-elect, before the new speaker then administers the oath to the other members.

While deans perform the swearing-in ceremony for the newly elected speaker, they do not preside over the election of a speaker, as do the Father of the House of Commons of the United Kingdom and the dean of the Canadian House of Commons (that duty falls to the previous House's Clerk).

Because of other privileges associated with seniority, the dean is usually allotted some of the most desirable office space, and is generally either chair or ranking minority member of an influential committee.

It is unclear when the position first achieved concrete recognition, though the seniority system and increasing lengths of service emerged in the early 20th century. As late as 1924, Frederick H. Gillett was dean, and also speaker, before becoming a senator. Modern deans move into their positions so late in their careers that a move to the Senate is highly unlikely. When Ed Markey broke Gillett's record for time in the House before moving to the Senate in 2013 he was still decades junior to the sitting dean.

The deanship can change hands unexpectedly. In the 1952 election, Adolph J. Sabath became the first representative elected to a 24th term, breaking the record of 23 terms first set by former speaker Joseph Gurney Cannon, whose service had been non-consecutive, whereas Sabath's was not. North Carolina's Robert L. Doughton had not contested that election as he was retiring at the age of 89 years and two months, a House age record broken in 1998 by Sidney R. Yates, and again by Ralph Hall in 2012. However, Sabath died before the new term began and Doughton was dean for the old term's final months before Speaker Sam Rayburn became dean in the new Congress.

== List of deans of the House ==
Years as dean are followed by name, party, state, and start of service in Congress.

All the members of the First Congress had equal seniority (as defined for the purpose of this article), but Muhlenberg, as the speaker, was the first member to be sworn in. Muhlenberg, Hartley and Thatcher were among the 13 members who attended the initial meeting of the House on March 4, 1789.

In the eighteenth and nineteenth centuries, some state delegations to the House were often not elected until after the term had begun. To avoid confusion, this fact is ignored in the list below.

Became dean	End date	Dean		Party	State	Seniority from	Speaker(s)
March 4, 1789	March 3, 1797		Frederick Muhlenberg (Note: Served as Speaker 1789–1791 and 1793–1795.)	Pro-Administration	PA	March 4, 1789	Frederick Muhlenberg (1789–1791)
March 4, 1789	March 3, 1797		Frederick Muhlenberg	Pro-Administration	PA	March 4, 1789	Jonathan Trumbull Jr. (1791–1793)
March 4, 1789	March 3, 1797		Frederick Muhlenberg	Pro-Administration	PA	March 4, 1789	Frederick Muhlenberg (1793–1795)
March 4, 1789	March 3, 1797		Frederick Muhlenberg	Pro-Administration	PA	March 4, 1789	Jonathan Dayton (1795–1799)
March 4, 1797	December 21, 1800		Thomas Hartley (Note: Died in office.) (Note: Never held sole deanship due to tie.)	Federalist	PA	March 4, 1789	Jonathan Dayton (1795–1799)
March 4, 1797	December 21, 1800		Thomas Hartley	Federalist	PA	March 4, 1789	Theodore Sedgwick (1799–1801)
March 4, 1797	March 3, 1801		George Thatcher	Federalist	MA	March 4, 1789	Theodore Sedgwick (1799–1801)
March 4, 1801	March 3, 1803		William B. Grove	Federalist	NC	March 4, 1791	Nathaniel Macon (1801–1807)
March 4, 1801	March 3, 1807		Andrew Gregg	Democratic-Republican	PA	March 4, 1791	Nathaniel Macon (1801–1807)
March 4, 1801	December 13, 1815	NC-Congress-NathanielMacon	Nathaniel Macon (Note: Served as Speaker 1801–1807.)	Democratic-Republican	NC	March 4, 1791	Joseph Bradley Varnum (1807–1811)
March 4, 1801	December 13, 1815	NC-Congress-NathanielMacon	Nathaniel Macon	Democratic-Republican	NC	March 4, 1791	Henry Clay (1811–1814)
March 4, 1801	December 13, 1815	NC-Congress-NathanielMacon	Nathaniel Macon	Democratic-Republican	NC	March 4, 1791	Langdon Cheves (1814–1815)
December 13, 1815	April 9, 1816		Richard Stanford	Democratic-Republican	NC	March 4, 1797	Henry Clay (1815–1820)
April 9, 1816	March 3, 1817		John Davenport	Federalist	CT	March 4, 1799	Henry Clay (1815–1820)
March 4, 1817	March 3, 1830	Portrait_of_Thomas_Newton,_Jr._(1768-1847)	Thomas Newton Jr.	Democratic-Republican (1817–1825)	VA	March 4, 1801	Henry Clay (1815–1820)
March 4, 1817	March 3, 1830	Portrait_of_Thomas_Newton,_Jr._(1768-1847)	Thomas Newton Jr.	Democratic-Republican (1817–1825)	VA	March 4, 1801	John Taylor (1820–1821)
March 4, 1817	March 3, 1830	Portrait_of_Thomas_Newton,_Jr._(1768-1847)	Thomas Newton Jr.	Democratic-Republican (1817–1825)	VA	March 4, 1801	Philip P. Barbour (1821–1823)
March 4, 1817	March 3, 1830	Portrait_of_Thomas_Newton,_Jr._(1768-1847)	Thomas Newton Jr.	Democratic-Republican (1817–1825)	VA	March 4, 1801	Henry Clay (1823–1825)
March 4, 1817	March 3, 1830	Portrait_of_Thomas_Newton,_Jr._(1768-1847)	Thomas Newton Jr.	National Republican (1825–1830)	VA	March 4, 1801	John Taylor (1825–1827)
March 4, 1817	March 3, 1830	Portrait_of_Thomas_Newton,_Jr._(1768-1847)	Thomas Newton Jr.	National Republican (1825–1830)	VA	March 4, 1801	Andrew Stevenson (1827–1834)
March 4, 1830	March 3, 1833		William McCoy	Jacksonian	VA	March 4, 1811	Andrew Stevenson (1827–1834)
March 4, 1833	February 23, 1842		Lewis Williams	National Republican (1833–1837)	NC	March 4, 1815	Andrew Stevenson (1827–1834)
March 4, 1833	February 23, 1842		Lewis Williams	National Republican (1833–1837)	NC	March 4, 1815	John Bell (1834–1835)
March 4, 1833	February 23, 1842		Lewis Williams	National Republican (1833–1837)	NC	March 4, 1815	James K. Polk (1835–1839)
March 4, 1833	February 23, 1842		Lewis Williams	Whig (1837–1842)	NC	March 4, 1815	Robert M. T. Hunter (1839–1841)
March 4, 1833	February 23, 1842		Lewis Williams	Whig (1837–1842)	NC	March 4, 1815	John White (1841–1843)
February 23, 1842	March 3, 1843		Horace Everett	Whig	VT	March 4, 1829	John Winston Jones (1843–1845)
February 23, 1842	April 22, 1844		Dixon H. Lewis	Democratic	AL	March 4, 1829	John Winston Jones (1843–1845)
April 22, 1844	February 23, 1848	John_Quincy_Adams_in_1843	John Quincy Adams	Whig	MA	March 4, 1831	John Wesley Davis (1845–1847)
April 22, 1844	February 23, 1848	John_Quincy_Adams_in_1843	John Quincy Adams	Whig	MA	March 4, 1831	Robert Charles Winthrop (1847–1849)
April 22, 1844	March 3, 1849		James I. McKay	Democratic	NC	March 4, 1831	Robert Charles Winthrop (1847–1849)
March 4, 1849	March 3, 1855	Portrait_of_Linn_Boyd	Linn Boyd (Note: Previously served in House 1835–1837; Served as Speaker 1851–1855.)	Democratic	KY	March 4, 1839	Howell Cobb (1849–1851)
March 4, 1849	March 3, 1855	Portrait_of_Linn_Boyd	Linn Boyd	Democratic	KY	March 4, 1839	Linn Boyd (1851–1856)
March 4, 1855	March 3, 1859		Joshua Reed Giddings	Republican	OH	May 5, 1842	Nathaniel P. Banks (1856–1857)
March 4, 1855	March 3, 1859		Joshua Reed Giddings	Republican	OH	May 5, 1842	James Lawrence Orr (1857–1860)
March 4, 1859	March 3, 1863		John S. Phelps	Democratic	MO	March 4, 1845	William Pennington (1860–1861)
March 4, 1859	March 3, 1863		John S. Phelps	Democratic	MO	March 4, 1845	Galusha A. Grow (1861–1863)
March 4, 1863	March 3, 1869	Elihu_B._Washburne_-_Brady-Handy	Elihu B. Washburne	Republican	IL	March 4, 1853	Schuyler Colfax (1863–1869)
March 4, 1863	March 3, 1869	Elihu_B._Washburne_-_Brady-Handy	Elihu B. Washburne	Republican	IL	March 4, 1853	Theodore M. Pomeroy (1869)
March 4, 1869	March 3, 1875	Hon._Henry_L._Dawes,_Mass_-_NARA_-_527181_(1)	Henry L. Dawes	Republican	MA	March 4, 1857	James G. Blaine (1869–1875)
March 4, 1875	January 9, 1890	William_D._Kelley_-_Brady-Handy	William D. Kelley	Republican	PA	March 4, 1861	Michael C. Kerr (1875–1876)
March 4, 1875	January 9, 1890	William_D._Kelley_-_Brady-Handy	William D. Kelley	Republican	PA	March 4, 1861	Samuel J. Randall (1876–1881)
March 4, 1875	January 9, 1890	William_D._Kelley_-_Brady-Handy	William D. Kelley	Republican	PA	March 4, 1861	J. Warren Keifer (1881–1883)
March 4, 1875	January 9, 1890	William_D._Kelley_-_Brady-Handy	William D. Kelley	Republican	PA	March 4, 1861	John G. Carlisle (1883–1889)
March 4, 1875	January 9, 1890	William_D._Kelley_-_Brady-Handy	William D. Kelley	Republican	PA	March 4, 1861	Thomas Brackett Reed (1889–1891)
January 9, 1890	April 13, 1890		Samuel J. Randall	Democratic	PA	March 4, 1863	Thomas Brackett Reed (1889–1891)
April 13, 1890	March 3, 1891	Portrait_of_Joseph_Gurney_Cannon	Joseph G. Cannon	Republican	IL	March 4, 1873	Thomas Brackett Reed (1889–1891)
April 13, 1890	March 22, 1892		Roger Q. Mills	Democratic	TX	March 4, 1873	Charles Frederick Crisp (1891–1895)
April 13, 1890	March 3, 1893		James H. Blount	Democratic	GA	March 4, 1873	Charles Frederick Crisp (1891–1895)
April 13, 1890	March 3, 1895		Richard P. Bland	Democratic	MO	March 4, 1873	Charles Frederick Crisp (1891–1895)
March 4, 1895	March 3, 1897		David B. Culberson	Democratic	TX	March 4, 1875	Thomas Brackett Reed (1895–1899)
March 4, 1897	September 4, 1899	TBReed_(cropped)	Thomas Brackett Reed (Note: Served as Speaker 1889–1891 and 1895–1899.)	Republican	ME	March 4, 1877	Thomas Brackett Reed (1895–1899)
March 4, 1897	March 6, 1900		Alfred C. Harmer	Republican	PA	March 4, 1877	David B. Henderson (1899–1903)
March 6, 1900	March 22, 1912	Henry_Harrison_Bingham	Henry H. Bingham	Republican	PA	March 4, 1879	David B. Henderson (1899–1903)
March 6, 1900	March 22, 1912	Henry_Harrison_Bingham	Henry H. Bingham	Republican	PA	March 4, 1879	Joseph G. Cannon (1903–1911)
March 6, 1900	March 22, 1912	Henry_Harrison_Bingham	Henry H. Bingham	Republican	PA	March 4, 1879	Champ Clark (1911–1919)
March 22, 1912	March 3, 1913		John Dalzell	Republican	PA	March 4, 1887	Champ Clark (1911–1919)
March 4, 1913	December 10, 1914	SerenoEPayne	Sereno E. Payne	Republican	NY	March 4, 1889	Champ Clark (1911–1919)
December 10, 1914	April 17, 1918		William A. Jones	Democratic	VA	March 4, 1891	Champ Clark (1911–1919)
April 17, 1918	March 3, 1919		Henry Allen Cooper	Republican	WI	March 4, 1893	Frederick H. Gillett (1919–1925)
April 17, 1918	March 3, 1925	Frederick_H._Gillett_circa_1920_(cropped)	Frederick H. Gillett (Note: Served as Speaker 1919–1925.)	Republican	MA	March 4, 1893	Frederick H. Gillett (1919–1925)
March 4, 1925	May 26, 1928		Thomas S. Butler	Republican	PA	March 4, 1897	Nicholas Longworth (1925–1931)
May 26, 1928	March 3, 1933		Gilbert N. Haugen	Republican	IA	March 4, 1899	Nicholas Longworth (1925–1931)
May 26, 1928	March 3, 1933		Gilbert N. Haugen	Republican	IA	March 4, 1899	John Nance Garner (1931–1933)
March 4, 1933	April 1, 1934	POU,_E.W._HONORABLE_LCCN2016860372	Edward W. Pou	Democratic	NC	March 4, 1901	Henry T. Rainey (1933–1935)
April 1, 1934	November 6, 1952		Adolph J. Sabath	Democratic	IL	March 4, 1907	Jo Byrns (1935–1936)
April 1, 1934	November 6, 1952		Adolph J. Sabath	Democratic	IL	March 4, 1907	William B. Bankhead (1936–1940)
April 1, 1934	November 6, 1952		Adolph J. Sabath	Democratic	IL	March 4, 1907	Sam Rayburn (1940–1947)
April 1, 1934	November 6, 1952		Adolph J. Sabath	Democratic	IL	March 4, 1907	Joseph W. Martin Jr. (1947–1949)
April 1, 1934	November 6, 1952		Adolph J. Sabath	Democratic	IL	March 4, 1907	Sam Rayburn (1949–1953)
November 6, 1952	January 3, 1953		Robert L. Doughton	Democratic	NC	March 4, 1911	Sam Rayburn (1949–1953)
January 3, 1953	November 16, 1961	Rayburn-Sam-LOC_(cropped)	Sam Rayburn (Note: Served as Speaker 1955–1961.)	Democratic	TX	March 4, 1913	Joseph W. Martin Jr. (1953–1955)
January 3, 1953	November 16, 1961	Rayburn-Sam-LOC_(cropped)	Sam Rayburn	Democratic	TX	March 4, 1913	Sam Rayburn (1955–1961)
November 16, 1961	January 3, 1965		Carl Vinson	Democratic	GA	November 3, 1914	John W. McCormack (1962–1971)
January 3, 1965	January 3, 1973	Emanuel_Celler_1967	Emanuel Celler	Democratic	NY	March 4, 1923	John W. McCormack (1962–1971)
January 3, 1965	January 3, 1973	Emanuel_Celler_1967	Emanuel Celler	Democratic	NY	March 4, 1923	Carl Albert (1971–1977)
January 3, 1973	March 7, 1976		Wright Patman	Democratic	TX	March 4, 1929	Carl Albert (1971–1977)
March 7, 1976	January 3, 1979		George H. Mahon	Democratic	TX	January 3, 1935	Tip O'Neill (1977–1987)
January 3, 1979	January 3, 1995		Jamie Whitten	Democratic	MS	November 4, 1941	Tip O'Neill (1977–1987)
January 3, 1979	January 3, 1995		Jamie Whitten	Democratic	MS	November 4, 1941	Jim Wright (1987–1989)
January 3, 1979	January 3, 1995		Jamie Whitten	Democratic	MS	November 4, 1941	Tom Foley (1989–1995)
January 3, 1995	January 3, 2015	JohnnyDingell	John Dingell (Note: Longest serving House member ever and held the longest deanship.)	Democratic	MI	December 13, 1955	Newt Gingrich (1995–1999)
January 3, 1995	January 3, 2015	JohnnyDingell	John Dingell	Democratic	MI	December 13, 1955	Dennis Hastert (1999–2007)
January 3, 1995	January 3, 2015	JohnnyDingell	John Dingell	Democratic	MI	December 13, 1955	Nancy Pelosi (2007–2011)
January 3, 1995	January 3, 2015	JohnnyDingell	John Dingell	Democratic	MI	December 13, 1955	John Boehner (2011–2015)
January 3, 2015	December 5, 2017	John_Conyers_113th_Congress	John Conyers (Note: Resigned.)	Democratic	MI	January 3, 1965	John Boehner (2011–2015)
January 3, 2015	December 5, 2017	John_Conyers_113th_Congress	John Conyers	Democratic	MI	January 3, 1965	Paul Ryan (2015–2019)
December 5, 2017	March 18, 2022		Don Young	Republican	AK	March 6, 1973	Paul Ryan (2015–2019)
December 5, 2017	March 18, 2022		Don Young	Republican	AK	March 6, 1973	Nancy Pelosi (2019–2023)
March 18, 2022	Incumbent	Harold_Rogers_118th_Congress	Hal Rogers	Republican	KY	January 3, 1981	Nancy Pelosi (2019–2023)
March 18, 2022	Incumbent	Harold_Rogers_118th_Congress	Hal Rogers	Republican	KY	January 3, 1981	Kevin McCarthy (2023)
March 18, 2022	Incumbent	Harold_Rogers_118th_Congress	Hal Rogers	Republican	KY	January 3, 1981	Mike Johnson (2023–present)

== See also ==
- Dean of the United States Senate
- Father of the House, the international equivalent in many countries; originally coined in the House of Commons of the United Kingdom
- List of members of the United States Congress by longevity of service
