= Peter Muhlenberg =

American politician (1746–1807)

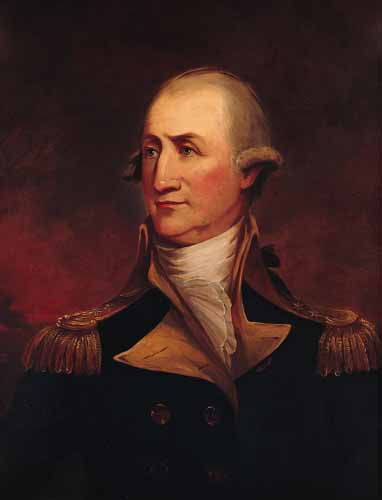

United States Senator from Pennsylvania
- In office March 4, 1801 – June 30, 1801
- Preceded by: William Bingham
- Succeeded by: George Logan

Member of the U.S. House of Representatives from Pennsylvania's 4th district
- In office March 4, 1799 – March 4, 1801
- Preceded by: John Chapman
- Succeeded by: Isaac Van Horne

Member of the U.S. House of Representatives from Pennsylvania's at-large district
- In office March 4, 1793 – March 4, 1795
- Preceded by: Constituency established
- Succeeded by: Constituency abolished
- In office March 4, 1789 – March 4, 1791
- Preceded by: Constituency established
- Succeeded by: Constituency abolished

8th Vice-President of Pennsylvania
- In office October 31, 1787 – October 14, 1788
- President: Benjamin Franklin
- Preceded by: Charles Biddle
- Succeeded by: David Redick

Personal details
- Born: John Peter Gabriel Muhlenberg; October 1, 1746 Trappe, Pennsylvania, British America
- Died: October 1, 1807 (aged 61) Grays Ferry, Philadelphia, Pennsylvania, U.S.
- Party: Democratic-Republican
- Relations: Muhlenberg family Conrad Weiser (maternal grandfather)
- Profession: Minister, Politician, Soldier
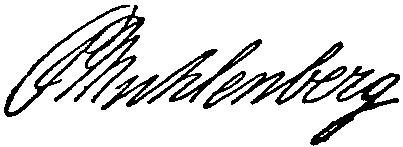
- Signature

Military service
- Allegiance: United States
- Branch/service: Continental Army
- Years of service: 1776–1783
- Rank: Major General
- Commands: 8th Virginia Regiment
- Battles/wars: American Revolutionary War; Battle of Brandywine; Battle of Germantown; Valley Forge; Battle of Monmouth; Siege of Yorktown

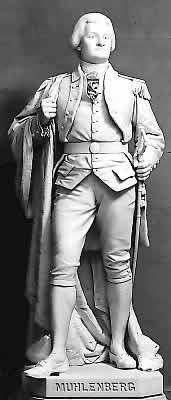
Peter Muhlenberg statue by Blanche Nevin at the United States Capitol building.

John Peter Gabriel Muhlenberg (October 1, 1746 – October 1, 1807) was an American clergyman and military officer who served during the American Revolutionary War. A member of Pennsylvania's prominent Muhlenberg family political dynasty, he became a respected figure in the newly independent United States as a Lutheran minister and member of the United States House of Representatives and United States Senate.

== Early life and education ==
Muhlenberg was born October 1, 1746, in Trappe in the Province of Pennsylvania to Anna Maria Weiser, the daughter of Pennsylvania Dutch pioneer and diplomat Conrad Weiser, and Henry Melchior Muhlenberg, a German Lutheran pastor.

In 1763, along with his brothers, Frederick Augustus and Gotthilf Henry Ernst, he was sent to Halle, where they were educated in Latin at the Francke Foundations. In 1767, he left school to begin his career as a sales assistant in Lübeck, but returned the same year to Pennsylvania.

== Career ==
He briefly served in the British Army's 60th Regiment of Foot, and also served for a short while in the German dragoons, earning the nickname "Teufel Piet" (Devil Pete) before returning to Philadelphia in 1767, where he was given a classical education from the Academy of Philadelphia (the modern University of Pennsylvania). He was ordained in 1768 and headed a Lutheran congregation in Bedminster, New Jersey, before moving to Woodstock, Virginia.

Muhlenberg visited England in 1772 and was ordained into the priesthood of the Anglican Church, although he served a Lutheran congregation. Since the Anglican Church was the state church of Virginia, he was required to be ordained in an Anglican church in order to serve a congregation in Virginia. Besides his new congregation, he led the Committee of Safety and Correspondence for Dunmore County, Virginia. He was elected to the House of Burgesses in 1774, and was a delegate to the First Virginia Convention. Muhlenberg owned a number of slaves, believing it was sanctioned by religious scripture as a means of redemption.

=== Military career ===
After the American Revolutionary War broke out in 1775, the Continental Army was formed. Muhlenberg was authorized to raise and command the 8th Virginia Regiment of the Continental Army's Virginia Line as its colonel. He was very likely chosen due to his influence in the German–American community. Of the eight colonels in the Virginia Line, Muhlenberg was the youngest at 29 and only Patrick Henry had less military experience.

According to a biography written by his great-nephew in the mid-19th century, on January 21, 1776, in the Lutheran church in Woodstock, Virginia, Muhlenberg took his sermon text from the third chapter Ecclesiastes, which starts with "To every thing there is a season..."; after reading the eighth verse, "a time of war, and a time of peace," he declared, "And this is the time of war," removing his clerical robe to reveal his Colonel's uniform. Outside the church door the drums began to roll as men turned to kiss their wives and then walked down the aisle to enlist, and within half an hour, 162 men were enrolled. The next day he led out 300 men from the county to form the nucleus of the 8th Virginia Regiment. Though it is accepted that Muhlenberg helped form and lead the 8th, historians doubt the account of the sermon, as there are no reports prior to Muhlenberg's great-nephew's biography.

Muhlenberg's unit was first posted to the South, to defend the coast of South Carolina and Georgia. In early 1777, the Eighth Regiment was sent north to join Washington's main army. Muhlenberg was made a brigadier general of the Virginia Line and commanded that Brigade in Nathanael Greene's division at Valley Forge. Muhlenberg's Headquarters', assigned by Washington during the 1777–1778 Winter Encampment at Valley Forge, is now known as the Moore-Irwin House in King of Prussia, PA, and was also the estate Washington wrote in his diary of visiting with other Founding Fathers Gouverneur Morris and Robert Morris during a rare break in the 1787 Constitutional Convention in Philadelphia. Muhlenberg saw service in the Battles of Brandywine, Germantown, and Monmouth. After Monmouth, most of the Virginia Line was sent to the far south, while General Muhlenberg was assigned to head up the defense of Virginia using mainly militia units.

At the Battle of Yorktown, he commanded the first brigade in Lafayette's Light Division. His brigade was part of the Corps of Light Infantry, consisting of the light infantry companies of the line regiments of Massachusetts (ten companies), Connecticut (five companies), New Hampshire (five companies), and Rhode Island and New Jersey (one each). They held the right flank and manned the two trenches built to move American cannons closer to Cornwallis' defenses. The battalion commanded by American Lt. Colonel Alexander Hamilton and French Lieutenant Colonel Jean-Joseph Sourbader de Gimat led the night bayonet attack that stormed Redoubt No. 10 on October 14, 1781.

At the end of the war (1783), he was brevetted to major general and settled in Montgomery County, Pennsylvania.

Muhlenberg was also an original member of the Pennsylvania Society of the Cincinnati.

=== Political career ===
After the war, Muhlenberg was elected to the Supreme Executive Council of the Commonwealth of Pennsylvania in 1784. He was elected Vice-President of the Council, a position comparable to that of Lieutenant Governor, on October 31, 1787. His term as Vice-President ended on a mysterious note. On October 14, 1788, the minutes of the Executive Council report that Muhlenberg had left Philadelphia without tendering his resignation—why his resignation was needed or expected is not noted—so a messenger was sent after him. That night, after the messenger returned with the resignation, the Council met at President Benjamin Franklin's home to choose Muhlenberg's successor, electing David Redick to the position.

Muhlenberg was elected to the 1st Congress (1789–1791) and 3rd Congress (1793–1795) as one of the at-large representatives from Pennsylvania. His brother Frederick was the Speaker of the House for that same Congress. He was the first founder of the Democratic-Republican Societies in 1793. Muhlenberg served in Congress as a Republican during the 5th Congress 1799–1801 for the 4th district, previously running for this district in 1796. He was the Anti-Administration nominee in the 1795 United States Senate election in Pennsylvania. Muhlenberg was elected by the legislature to the U.S. Senate on a second ballot in February 1801 over George Logan, but resigned on June 30 of that same year.

President Thomas Jefferson appointed him the supervisor of revenue for Pennsylvania in 1801 and customs collector for Philadelphia in 1802. He served in the latter post until his death.

On August 3, 1805, Muhlenberg wrote a letter to the residents of the primarily-German Northampton and Berks counties in a successful attempt to tilt those counties toward incumbent Governor Thomas McKean, who, in the midst of a badly fractured state Republican Party, was running with Federalist support, in his bid for reelection. Muhlenberg noted that although McKean's opponent, Simon Snyder, was of German descent, his election would elevate the Republican Party's radical Democratic faction to power and, with calls for a Constitutional Convention to elevate the power of the state legislature over the governor and especially the judiciary, result in anarchy. McKean's margin of victory, 6,772–3,216, over Snyder in Northampton and Berks secured his narrow, 43,644–38,483, statewide margin of victory over Snyder.

== Personal life ==
On November 6, 1770, he married Anna Barbara "Hannah" Meyer, the daughter of a successful potter. Together they had six children, including:

- Francis Swaine Muhlenberg (1795–1831), a U.S. Representative from Ohio who married Mary Barr Denny (1806–1893) in 1831, shortly before his death in December 1831. After his death, Francis' widow married Richard Hubbell Hopkins.

On his 61st birthday, Muhlenberg died in Gray's Ferry, Pennsylvania, on October 1, 1807, and is buried at the Augustus Lutheran Church in Trappe, Pennsylvania.

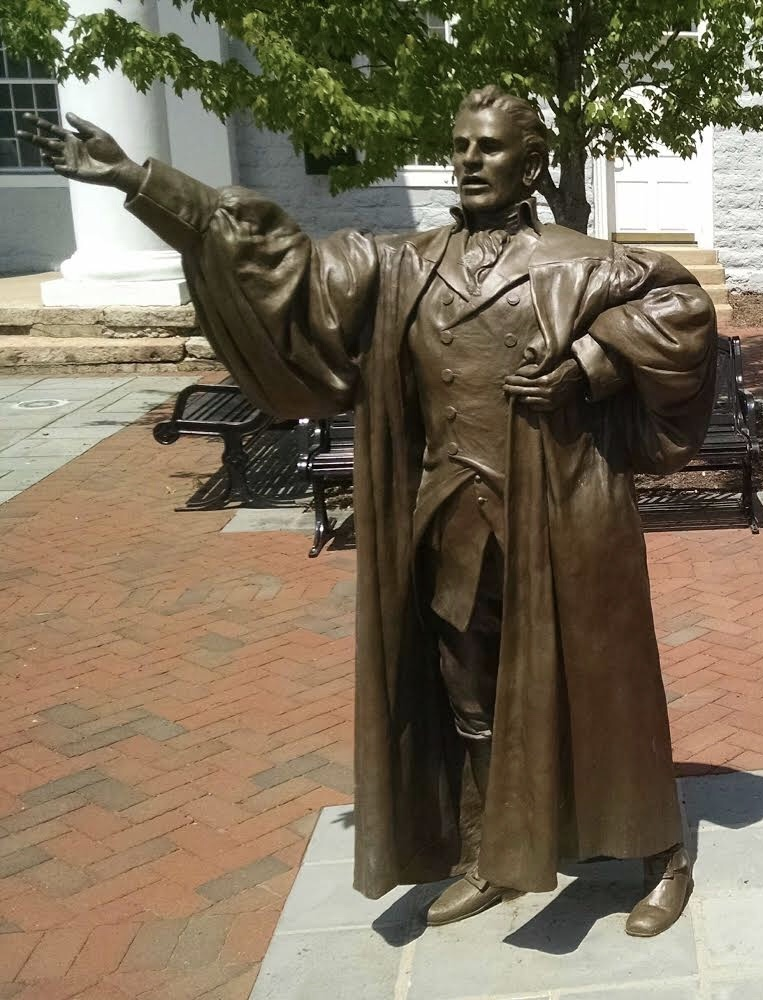
Peter Muhlenberg statue in front of the Shenandoah County Courthouse in Woodstock, Virginia

== Legacy ==
- Muhlenberg is the namesake of Muhlenberg County, Kentucky.
- A memorial to Peter Muhlenberg is located in Washington, D.C., on Connecticut Avenue (see image).
- Another memorial to him stands behind the Philadelphia Museum of Art.
- Two statues of Peter Muhlenberg are located in front of the Shenandoah County Courthouse in Woodstock, Virginia, and the town's Emmanuel Lutheran congregation preserves communion vessels, a baptismal font and altar cloth that he used.
- Peter Muhlenberg Middle School in Shenandoah County, Virginia is named for Muhlenberg.
- Muhlenberg College in Allentown, Pennsylvania, displays a statue of John P. G. Muhlenberg in front of the Haas College Center, 2400 Chew Street.

== Sources ==
- Cecere, Michael. "The Fighting Parson's Farewell Sermon." Journal of the American Revolution, April 15, 2020.
- Hocker, Edward W. The Fighting Parson of the American Revolution: A Biography of General Peter Muhlenberg, Lutheran Clergyman, Military Chieftain, and Political Leader (1936).
- Muhlenberg, Henry Augustus. The Life of Major-General Peter Muhlenberg: Of the Revolutionary Army (1849). online
- Neville, Gabriel (2025). The Last Men Standing: the 8th Virginia Regiment in the American Revolution. Warwick, Helion and Company. ISBN 1-80451-672-4.
- Rightmyer, Thomas Nelson. "The Holy Orders of Peter Muhlenberg." Historical Magazine of the Protestant Episcopal Church 30.3 (1961): 183–197. online
- Pinkowski, Edward. "Washington's Officers Slept Here: Historic Homes of Valley Forge and Its Neighborhood", Sunshine Press, 1953 – 278 pages
- Schenawolf, Harry (November 2022). "General 'Devil Pete' Muhlenberg: From Pulpit to Battlefield". Revolutionary War Journal.
- Genzmer, George Harvey (1934). Dictionary of American biography. Vol. XIII. New York: Charles Scribner's Sons. pp. 311–313.

Political offices
Preceded by Daniel Hiester	Member, Supreme Executive Council of Pennsylvania, representing Montgomery County; October 24, 1785 – October 16, 1788	Succeeded by Zebulon Potts
Preceded by Charles Biddle	Vice-President of Pennsylvania; October 31, 1787 – October 14, 1788	Succeeded by David Redick
U.S. House of Representatives
Preceded by District Created	Member of the U.S. House of Representatives from Pennsylvania's at-large congressional district 1789–1791; Served alongside: George Clymer, Thomas Fitzsimons, Thomas Hartley, Frederick A.C. Muhlenberg, Henry Wynkoop, Daniel Hiester and Thomas Scott	Succeeded by Frederick A.C. Muhlenberg, Thomas Fitzsimons, Thomas Hartley, Israel Jacobs, John W. Kittera, Daniel Hiester, William Findley, and Andrew Gregg
Preceded by Frederick A.C. Muhlenberg, Thomas Fitzsimons, Thomas Hartley, Israel Jacobs, John W. Kittera, Daniel Hiester, William Findley, and Andrew Gregg	Member of the U.S. House of Representatives from Pennsylvania's at-large congressional district 1793–1795; Served alongside: Thomas Fitzsimons, John W. Kittera, Thomas Hartley, Frederick A.C. Muhlenberg, James Armstrong, Thomas Scott, Andrew Gregg, Daniel Hiester, William Irvine, William Findley, John Smilie, and William Montgomery	Succeeded by 1st: John Swanwick; 2nd: Frederick A.C. Muhlenberg; 3rd: Richard Thomas; 4th: Samuel Sitgreaves and John Richards; 5th: Daniel Hiester; 6th: John Andre Hanna; 7th: John W. Kittera; 8th: Thomas Hartley; 9th: Andrew Gregg; 10th: David Bard and Samuel Maclay; 11th: William Findley 12th: Albert Gallatin
Preceded by Robert Brown; John Chapman	Member of the U.S. House of Representatives from Pennsylvania's 4th congressional district 1799–1801 alongside: Robert Brown	Succeeded by Robert Brown; Isaac Van Horne
U.S. Senate
Preceded by William Bingham	U.S. senator (Class 3) from Pennsylvania; 1801; Served alongside: James Ross	Succeeded by George Logan
