= Pennsylvania's at-large congressional district =

Former U.S. House district in Pennsylvania

Coordinates: 41°00′N 77°30′W

- Obsolete district
- Created: 1789; 1793; 1873; 1883; 1893; 1913; 1943
- Eliminated: 1791; 1795; 1875; 1889; 1903; 1923; 1945
- Years active: 1789–1791; 1793–1795; 1873–1875; 1883–1889; 1893–1903; 1913–1923; 1943–1945

The U.S. state of Pennsylvania elected its United States representatives at-large on a general ticket for the first and third United States Congresses. General ticket representation was prohibited by the 1842 Apportionment Bill and subsequent legislation, most recently in 1967 (Pub. L. 90–196, 2 U.S.C. § 2c).

Some representatives, including Galusha A. Grow, served at-large after 1842 (in Grow's case, it was from 1894 to 1903). This was allowed because Pennsylvania had received an increase in the number of its representatives yet its legislature didn't pass an apportionment bill during those years.

== List of representatives ==
=== 1789–1795: eight then thirteen seats ===
Representatives were elected statewide at-large on a general ticket.

Congress	Seat A	Seat B	Seat C	Seat D	Seat E	Seat F	Seat G	Seat H	Seat I	Seat J	Seat K	Seat L	Seat M
1st (1789–1791)	Thomas Fitzsimons (Pro-Admin-Philadelphia) Elected in 1788. Redistricted to the 1st district and re-elected.	Frederick Muhlenberg (Pro-Admin-New Hanover Township) Elected in 1788. Redistricted to the 2nd district and re-elected.	Peter Muhlenberg (Anti-Admin-Montgomery County) Elected in 1788. Redistricted to the 3rd district and lost re-election.	Daniel Hiester (Anti-Admin-Montgomery County) Elected in 1788. Redistricted to the 4th district and re-elected.	Henry Wynkoop (Pro-Admin-Kingston) Elected in 1788. Retired.	Thomas Scott (Pro-Admin-Washington County) Elected in 1788. Retired.	Thomas Hartley (Pro-Admin-York) Elected in 1788. Redistricted to the 7th district and re-elected.	George Clymer (Pro-Admin-Philadelphia) Elected in 1788. Retired.					
2nd (1791–1793)	From 1791 to 1793, members were elected by districts.												
3rd (1793–1795)	In 1793, at-large representation was restored								… and five seats were added				
3rd (1793–1795)	Thomas Fitzsimons (Pro-Admin-Philadelphia) Redistricted from the 1st district and re-elected in 1792. Redistricted to the 1st district and lost re-election.	Frederick Muhlenberg (Anti-Admin-New Hanover Township) Redistricted from the 2nd district and re-elected in 1792. Redistricted to the 2nd district and re-elected.	Peter Muhlenberg (Anti-Admin-Montgomery County) Elected in 1792. Redistricted to the 4th district and lost re-election.	Daniel Hiester (Anti-Admin-Montgomery County) Redistricted from the 4th district and re-elected in 1792. Redistricted to the 5th district and re-elected.	John W. Kittera (Pro-Admin-Lancaster) Redistricted from the 5th district and re-elected in 1792. Redistricted to the 7th district and re-elected.	Andrew Gregg (Anti-Admin-Carlisle) Redistricted from the 6th district and re-elected in 1792. Redistricted to the 9th district and re-elected.	Thomas Hartley (Pro-Admin-York) Redistricted from the 7th district and re-elected in 1792. Redistricted to the 8th district and re-elected.	William Findley (Anti-Admin-Youngstown) Redistricted from the 8th district and re-elected in 1792. Redistricted to the 11th district and re-elected.	James Armstrong (Pro-Admin-Mifflin County) Elected in 1792. Retired.	William Irvine (Anti-Admin-Carlisle) Elected in 1792. Redistricted to the 9th district and lost re-election.	Thomas Scott (Pro-Admin-Washington County) Elected in 1792. Redistricted to the 12th district and lost re-election.	John Smilie (Anti-Admin-Fayette County) Elected in 1792. Retired.	William Montgomery (Anti-Admin-Montgomery's Landing) Elected in 1792. Retired.

After 1795, most representatives were elected in districts. Occasionally, at-large representatives were also elected.

=== 1873–1945 ===
Cong ress	Years	Seat A			Seat B			Seat C			Seat D		
Cong ress	Years	Representative	Party	Electoral history	Representative	Party	Electoral history	Representative	Party	Electoral history	Representative	Party	Electoral history
43	March 4, 1873 – March 4, 1875	Charles Albright (Mauch Chunk)	Republican	Elected in 1872. Retired.	Glenni W. Scofield (Warren)	Republican	Redistricted from the 19th district and re-elected in 1872. Retired.	Lemuel Todd (Carlisle)	Republican	Elected in 1872. Retired.	No fourth seat		
44	March 4, 1875 – March 3, 1877	No at-large seats											
45	March 4, 1877 – March 43 1879	No at-large seats											
46	March 4, 1879 – March 3, 1881	No at-large seats											
47	March 4, 1881 – March 3, 1883	No at-large seats											
48	March 4, 1883 – March 3, 1885	Mortimer F. Elliott (Wellsboro)	Democratic	Elected in 1882. Lost re-election.	No second seat			No third seat			No fourth seat		
49	March 4, 1885 – March 3, 1887	Edwin S. Osborne (Wilkes-Barre)	Republican	Elected in 1884. Re-elected in 1886. Redistricted to the 12th district.	No second seat			No third seat			No fourth seat		
50	March 4, 1887 – March 3, 1889	Edwin S. Osborne (Wilkes-Barre)	Republican	Elected in 1884. Re-elected in 1886. Redistricted to the 12th district.	No second seat			No third seat			No fourth seat		
51	March 4, 1889 – March 3, 1891	No at-large seats											
52	March 4, 1891 – March 3, 1893	No at-large seats											
53	March 4, 1893 – December 1, 1893	Alexander McDowell (Sharon)	Republican	Elected in 1892. Retired.	William Lilly (Mauch Chunk)	Republican	Elected in 1892 Died.	No third seat			No fourth seat		
53	December 1, 1893 – February 26, 1894	Alexander McDowell (Sharon)	Republican	Elected in 1892. Retired.	Vacant			No third seat			No fourth seat		
53	February 26, 1894 – March 3, 1895	Alexander McDowell (Sharon)	Republican	Elected in 1892. Retired.	Galusha A. Grow (Glenwood)	Republican	Elected to fill Lilly's vacancy. Elected to full term in 1894. Re-elected in 1896. Re-elected in 1898. Re-elected in 1900. Retired.	No third seat			No fourth seat		
54	March 4, 1895 – March 3, 1897	George F. Huff (Greensburg)	Republican	Elected in 1894. Retired.	Galusha A. Grow (Glenwood)	Republican	Elected to fill Lilly's vacancy. Elected to full term in 1894. Re-elected in 1896. Re-elected in 1898. Re-elected in 1900. Retired.	No third seat			No fourth seat		
55	March 4, 1897 – March 3, 1899	Samuel A. Davenport (Erie)	Republican	Elected in 1896. Re-elected in 1898. Retired.	Galusha A. Grow (Glenwood)	Republican	Elected to fill Lilly's vacancy. Elected to full term in 1894. Re-elected in 1896. Re-elected in 1898. Re-elected in 1900. Retired.	No third seat			No fourth seat		
56	March 4, 1899 – March 3, 1901	Samuel A. Davenport (Erie)	Republican	Elected in 1896. Re-elected in 1898. Retired.	Galusha A. Grow (Glenwood)	Republican	Elected to fill Lilly's vacancy. Elected to full term in 1894. Re-elected in 1896. Re-elected in 1898. Re-elected in 1900. Retired.	No third seat			No fourth seat		
57	March 4, 1901 – March 3, 1903	Robert H. Foerderer (Philadelphia)	Republican	Elected in 1900. Redistricted to the 4th district.	Galusha A. Grow (Glenwood)	Republican	Elected to fill Lilly's vacancy. Elected to full term in 1894. Re-elected in 1896. Re-elected in 1898. Re-elected in 1900. Retired.	No third seat			No fourth seat		
58	March 4, 1903 – March 3, 1905	No at-large seats											
59	March 4, 1905 – March 3, 1907	No at-large seats											
60	March 4, 1907 – March 3, 1909	No at-large seats											
61	March 4, 1909 – March 3, 1911	No at-large seats											
62	March 4, 1911 – March 3, 1913	No at-large seats											
63	March 4, 1913 – March 3, 1915	Fred E. Lewis (Allentown)	Republican	Elected in 1912. [data missing].	John M. Morin (Pittsburgh)	Republican	Elected in 1912. Redistricted to the 31st district.	Anderson H. Walters (Johnstown)	Republican	Elected in 1912. Retired.	Arthur R. Rupley (Carlisle)	Republican	Elected in 1912. [data missing].
64	March 4, 1915 – March 3, 1917	John R. K. Scott (Philadelphia)	Republican	Elected in 1914. Re-elected in 1916. Resigned.	Thomas S. Crago (Waynesburg)	Republican	Elected in 1914. Re-elected in 1916. Re-elected in 1918. Retired.	Daniel F. Lafean (York)	Republican	Elected in 1914. Retired.	Mahlon M. Garland (Pittsburgh)	Republican	Elected in 1914. Re-elected in 1916. Re-elected in 1918. Died.
65	March 4, 1917 – January 5, 1919	John R. K. Scott (Philadelphia)	Republican	Elected in 1914. Re-elected in 1916. Resigned.	Thomas S. Crago (Waynesburg)	Republican	Elected in 1914. Re-elected in 1916. Re-elected in 1918. Retired.	Joseph McLaughlin (Philadelphia)	Republican	Elected in 1916. Lost renomination.	Mahlon M. Garland (Pittsburgh)	Republican	Elected in 1914. Re-elected in 1916. Re-elected in 1918. Died.
65	January 6, 1919 – March 3, 1919	Vacant			Thomas S. Crago (Waynesburg)	Republican	Elected in 1914. Re-elected in 1916. Re-elected in 1918. Retired.	Joseph McLaughlin (Philadelphia)	Republican	Elected in 1916. Lost renomination.	Mahlon M. Garland (Pittsburgh)	Republican	Elected in 1914. Re-elected in 1916. Re-elected in 1918. Died.
66	March 4, 1919 – November 19, 1920	William J. Burke (Pittsburgh)	Republican	Elected in 1918. Re-elected in 1920. Lost re-election.	Thomas S. Crago (Waynesburg)	Republican	Elected in 1914. Re-elected in 1916. Re-elected in 1918. Retired.	Anderson H. Walters (Johnstown)	Republican	Elected in 1918. Re-elected in 1920. Retired.	Mahlon M. Garland (Pittsburgh)	Republican	Elected in 1914. Re-elected in 1916. Re-elected in 1918. Died.
66	November 20, 1920 – March 3, 1921	William J. Burke (Pittsburgh)	Republican	Elected in 1918. Re-elected in 1920. Lost re-election.	Thomas S. Crago (Waynesburg)	Republican	Elected in 1914. Re-elected in 1916. Re-elected in 1918. Retired.	Anderson H. Walters (Johnstown)	Republican	Elected in 1918. Re-elected in 1920. Retired.	Vacant		
67	March 4, 1921 – September 20, 1921	William J. Burke (Pittsburgh)	Republican	Elected in 1918. Re-elected in 1920. Lost re-election.	Joseph McLaughlin (Philadelphia)	Republican	Elected in 1920. Retired.	Anderson H. Walters (Johnstown)	Republican	Elected in 1918. Re-elected in 1920. Retired.	Vacant		
67	September 20, 1921 – March 3, 1923	William J. Burke (Pittsburgh)	Republican	Elected in 1918. Re-elected in 1920. Lost re-election.	Joseph McLaughlin (Philadelphia)	Republican	Elected in 1920. Retired.	Anderson H. Walters (Johnstown)	Republican	Elected in 1918. Re-elected in 1920. Retired.	Thomas S. Crago (Waynesburg)	Republican	Elected to finish Garland's term in 1921. Retired.
68	March 4, 1923 – March 3, 1925	No at-large seats											
69	March 4, 1925 – March 4, 1927	No at-large seats											
70	March 4, 1927 – March 3, 1929	No at-large seats											
71	March 4, 1929 – March 3, 1931	No at-large seats											
72	March 4, 1931 – March 3, 1933	No at-large seats											
73	March 4, 1933 – January 3, 1935	No at-large seats											
74	January 3, 1935 – January 3, 1937	No at-large seats											
75	January 3, 1937 – January 3, 1939	No at-large seats											
76	January 3, 1939 – January 3, 1941	No at-large seats											
77	January 3, 1941 – January 3, 1943	No at-large seats											
78	January 3, 1943 – January 2, 1945	William I. Troutman (Shamokin)	Republican	Elected in 1942. Resigned.	No second seat			No third seat			No fourth seat		
78	January 2, 1945 – January 3, 1945	Vacant			No second seat			No third seat			No fourth seat		

No at-large representatives were apportioned after the 78th Congress.
