= Senator Gregg =

Senator Gregg may refer to:

- Andrew Gregg (1755–1835), U.S. Senator from Pennsylvania from 1807 to 1813
- Judd Gregg (born 1947), U.S. Senator from New Hampshire from 1993 to 2011
