= Frederick Muhlenberg =

American minister and politician (1750–1801)

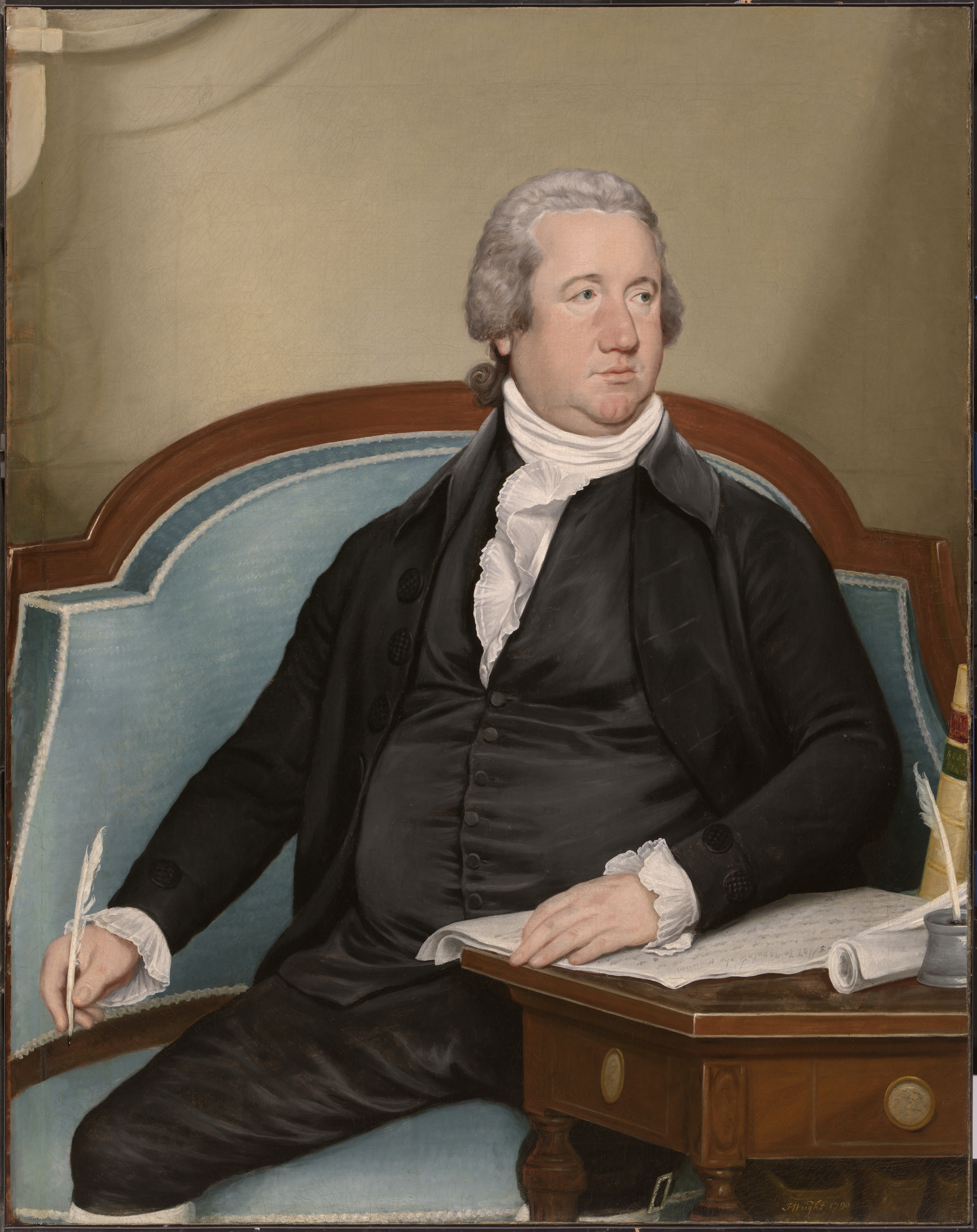
- Portrait of Frederick Muhlenberg by Joseph Wright, 1790

1st Speaker of the United States House of Representatives
- In office December 2, 1793 – March 4, 1795
- Preceded by: Jonathan Trumbull Jr.
- Succeeded by: Jonathan Dayton
- In office April 1, 1789 – March 4, 1791
- Preceded by: Office established
- Succeeded by: Jonathan Trumbull Jr.

1st Dean of the United States House of Representatives
- In office March 4, 1789 – March 4, 1797
- Preceded by: Office established
- Succeeded by: Thomas Hartley; George Thatcher

Member of the U.S. House of Representatives from Pennsylvania
- In office March 4, 1789 – March 4, 1797
- Preceded by: Constituency established
- Succeeded by: Blair McClenachan (2nd)
- Constituency: At-large (1789–1791); 2nd district (1791–1793); At-large (1793–1795); 2nd district (1795–1797)

3rd Speaker of the Pennsylvania House of Representatives
- In office November 3, 1780 – 1783

Member of the Pennsylvania House of Representatives
- In office 1780–1783

Delegate from Pennsylvania to the Continental Congress
- In office 1779–1780

Personal details
- Born: Frederick Augustus Conrad Muhlenberg; January 1, 1750 Trappe, Pennsylvania, British America
- Died: June 4, 1801 (aged 51) Lancaster, Pennsylvania, U.S.
- Resting place: Woodward Hill Cemetery
- Party: Democratic-Republican (1795–1801); Anti-Administration (1791–1795); Federalist Party (before 1791)
- Relatives: Muhlenberg family
- Education: University of Halle
- Profession: Minister; politician

Pennsylvania Historical Marker
- Official name: Frederick A. C. Muhlenberg (1750–1801)
- Type: Roadside
- Designated: April 12, 2008
- Location: 151 W Main St., Trappe, across from strip mall

Frederick Augustus Conrad Muhlenberg (/ˈmjuːlɪnbɜːrɡ/; January 1, 1750 – June 4, 1801) was an American minister and politician who was the first speaker of the United States House of Representatives from 1789 to 1791 and again from 1793 to 1795. Muhlenberg served as the first dean of the United States House of Representatives as well. A member of the Federalist Party, he was delegate to the Pennsylvania state constitutional convention and a member of the U.S. House of Representatives from Pennsylvania and a Lutheran pastor by profession, Muhlenberg was born in Trappe, Pennsylvania. His home, known as the Speaker's House, is now a museum and is currently undergoing restoration to restore its appearance during Muhlenberg's occupancy.

== Early life and education ==
Muhlenberg was born in Trappe, Pennsylvania, the son of Anna Maria (née Weiser) and Heinrich Melchior Mühlenberg. His father, an immigrant from Germany, was considered the founder of the Lutheran Church in North America. His maternal grandfather was Pennsylvania German colonial leader Conrad Weiser. His brother, Peter, was a general in the Continental Army and his brother Gotthilf Heinrich Ernst was a botanist.

In 1763, together with his brothers John Peter Gabriel and Gotthilf Henry Ernst, he attended the Latina at the Franckesche Stiftungen in Halle, Germany. In 1769, he attended the University of Halle, where he studied theology.

== Career ==
On October 25, 1770, Muhlenberg was ordained by the Pennsylvania Ministerium as a minister of the Lutheran Church. He preached in Stouchsburg, Pennsylvania, and Lebanon, Pennsylvania, from 1770 to 1774, and in New York City from 1774 to 1776. When the British Army entered New York at the onset of the American Revolutionary War, he felt obligated to leave, and returned to Pennsylvania. He moved to New Hanover Township, and was a pastor there and in Oley and New Goshenhoppen until August 1779.

=== Continental Congress ===
Muhlenberg was a member of the Continental Congress in 1779 and 1780, and served in the Pennsylvania House of Representatives from 1780 to 1783. He was elected its speaker on November 3, 1780. He was a delegate to and chairman of the Pennsylvania state constitutional convention in 1787 called to ratify the Federal Constitution. He was the first signer of the Bill of Rights.

=== U.S. House of Representatives ===
He served as a member of the U.S. House of Representatives from Pennsylvania in the first and the three succeeding United States Congresses (March 4, 1789 – March 4, 1797). Muhlenberg was also the first speaker of the United States House of Representatives. In August 1789, he cast the deciding vote for the location of the nation's new capital. He did not seek renomination as speaker in 1796. On April 29, 1796, as chairman of the Committee of the Whole, he cast the deciding vote for the laws necessary to carry out the Jay Treaty.

In 1794, during Muhlenberg's second tenure as Speaker, the House voted 42–41 against a proposal to translate some of the new country's laws into German. Muhlenberg, who himself abstained from the vote, commented later that "the faster the Germans become Americans, the better it will be." Even though he never cast a vote against the translation bill, a legend developed in which Muhlenberg was responsible for preventing the adoption of German as an official language of the United States.

According to another discredited legend, Muhlenberg also suggested that the title of the president of the United States should be "Mr. President," instead of "His High Mightiness" or "His Elected Majesty," as John Adams had suggested.

=== Other offices ===
Muhlenberg was the Federalist candidate in the 1793 Pennsylvania gubernatorial election, losing to incumbent Thomas Mifflin.

Muhlenberg was president of the council of censors of Pennsylvania, and was appointed receiver general of the Pennsylvania Land Office on January 8, 1800, serving until his death in Lancaster, Pennsylvania, on June 4, 1801.

== Personal life ==
On October 15, 1771, Muhlenberg married Catherine Schaeffer, the daughter of wealthy Philadelphia sugar refiner David Schaeffer. They had seven children.

== Death ==
On June 4, 1801, Muhlenberg died in Lancaster, Pennsylvania, at age 51. He was interred in Woodward Hill Cemetery in Lancaster.

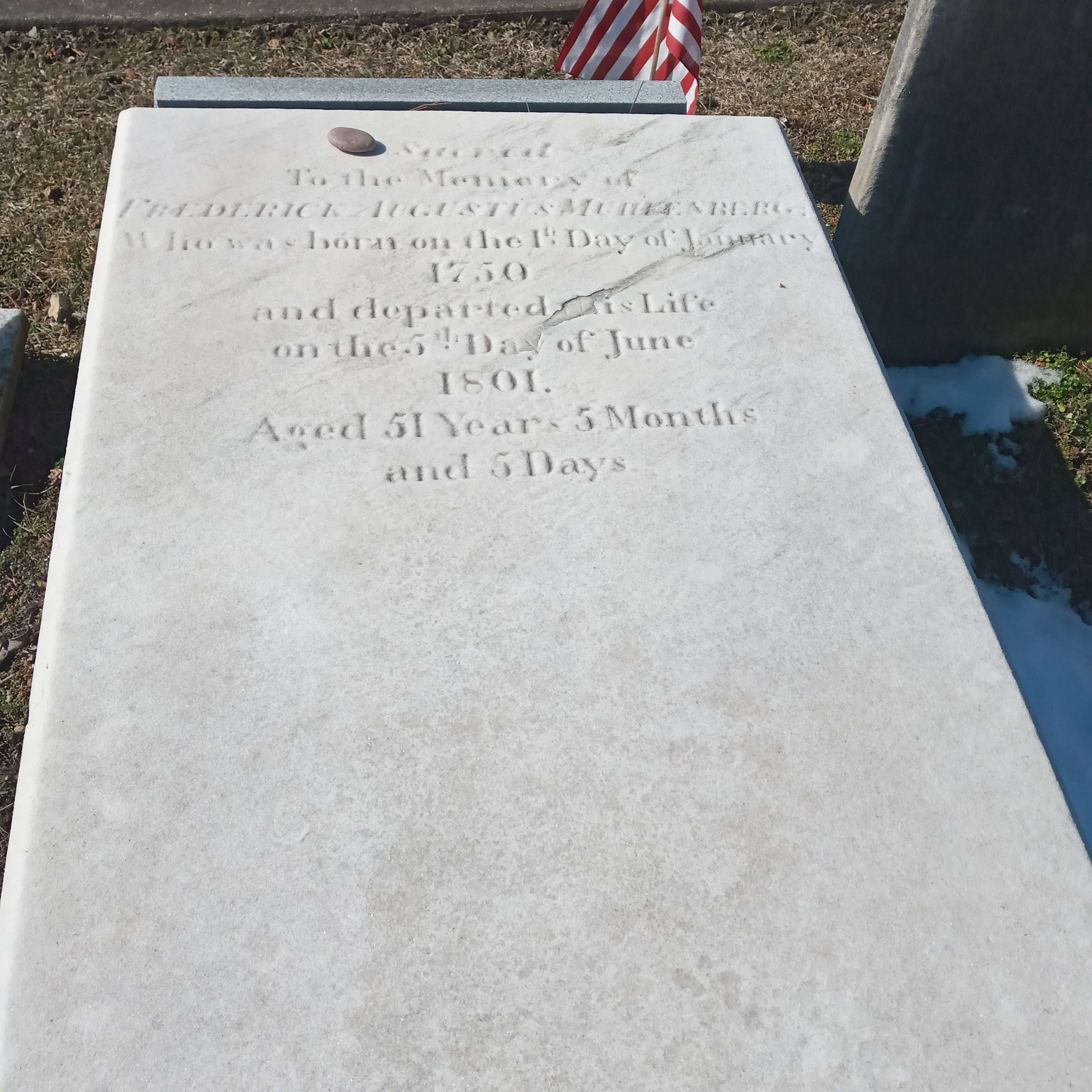
The gravesite of Speaker Muhlenberg

== Legacy ==
- On July 9, 1945, with World War II still ongoing, the S.S. Muhlenberg, named in Muhlenberg's honor, was launched at the Bethlehem Fairfield Shipyard in Baltimore.

== See also ==
- German language in the United States
- Muhlenberg College, in Allentown, Pennsylvania, named for Henry Muhlenberg
- The Speaker's House, in Trappe, Pennsylvania, home of Frederick Muhlenberg
- Muhlenberg family

== Notes ==
Party political offices
Preceded by Arthur St. Clair	Federalist nominee for Governor of Pennsylvania; 1793, 1796	Succeeded by James Ross
U.S. House of Representatives
New district	Member of the U.S. House of Representatives from Pennsylvania's at-large congressional district March 4, 1789 – March 4, 1791 alongside: George Clymer, Thomas Fitzsimons, Thomas Hartley, Thomas Scott, Henry Wynkoop, Daniel Hiester and Peter G. Muhlenberg	Succeeded by District eliminated Redistricted to the 2nd district
Preceded by District created Redistricted from the at-large district	Member of the U.S. House of Representatives from Pennsylvania's 2nd congressional district March 4, 1791 – March 4, 1793	Succeeded by District eliminated Redistricted to the 2nd district
Preceded by District created Redistricted from the at-large district	Member of the U.S. House of Representatives from Pennsylvania's at-large congressional district March 4, 1793 – March 4, 1795 alongside: Thomas Fitzsimons, John W. Kittera, Thomas Hartley, Thomas Scott, James Armstrong, Peter G. Muhlenberg, Andrew Gregg, Daniel Hiester, William Irvine, William Findley, John Smilie, and William Montgomery	Succeeded by District eliminated Redistricted to the 2nd district
Preceded by District created Redistricted from the at-large district	Member of the U.S. House of Representatives from Pennsylvania's 2nd congressional district March 4, 1795 – March 4, 1797	Succeeded by Blair McClenachan
Preceded by New position	Speaker of the U.S. House of Representatives; April 1, 1789 – March 4, 1791	Succeeded by Jonathan Trumbull Jr.
Preceded by Jonathan Trumbull Jr.	Speaker of the U.S. House of Representatives; December 2, 1793 – March 4, 1795	Succeeded by Jonathan Dayton
