= Thomas Hartley =

American politician

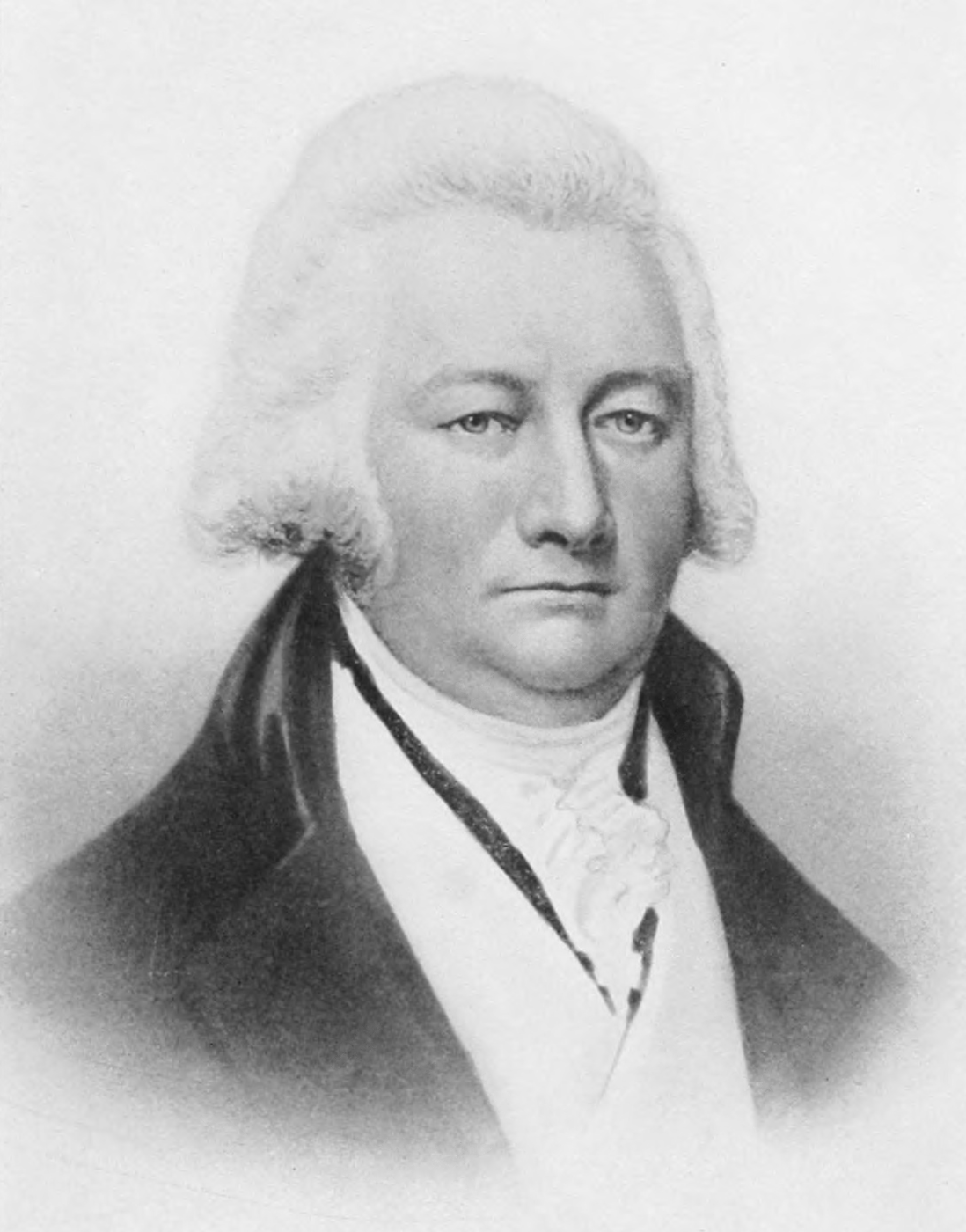

Member of the U.S. House of Representatives from Pennsylvania
- In office March 4, 1789 – December 21, 1800
- Preceded by: District created
- Succeeded by: John Stewart
- Constituency: at-large district (1789–1795); 8th district (1795–1800)

Personal details
- Born: September 7, 1748 Colebrookdale Township, Province of Pennsylvania, British America
- Died: December 21, 1800 (aged 52) York, Pennsylvania, U.S.
- Party: Pro-Administration; Federalist

Military service
- Allegiance: United States
- Branch/service: Continental Army
- Battles/wars: American Revolutionary War

Thomas Hartley (September 7, 1748 – December 21, 1800) was an American lawyer, soldier, and politician from York, Pennsylvania.

== Early life and education ==
Hartley was born in Colebrookdale Township in the Province of Pennsylvania. At 18 years of age, he moved to York, where he studied law under Samuel Johnson and was admitted to practice law in York County, Pennsylvania, and the courts in Philadelphia in 1769. He owned slaves.

== Career ==
In 1774, Hartley was appointed first lieutenant of a company of soldiers in York and the following summer was appointed lieutenant colonel of the First Battalion of York County Associators. In the fall of 1775, he served on an expedition to Canada and upon return was chosen as lieutenant-colonel of the Seventh Pennsylvania Regiment. He served as a member of the 1775 provincial convention at Philadelphia and commanded a 1778 Indian expedition. During the American Revolutionary War Hartley was second in command of the 6th Pennsylvania Regiment in the Continental Army. Beginning in January 1777, he raised and commanded Hartley's Additional Continental Regiment and commanded it as colonel during the major battles of the Philadelphia campaign, including Brandywine, Paoli, and Germantown. In 1778 the unit guarded the Pennsylvania frontier and, on September 24, 1778, mounted a two-week foray against hostile Indians, including the destruction of Queen Esther's Town on September 27. The regiment merged with other units in January 1779 to become the "new" 11th Pennsylvania Regiment and went with the Sullivan Expedition that summer. However, Harley was elected to the Pennsylvania General Assembly in October 1778 and resigned from his military in February 1779.

Hartley served in the Pennsylvania legislature in 1779 and returned to practice law in York. Hartley was a member of the Pennsylvania convention that ratified the federal constitution in 1787. He then represented Pennsylvania in the U.S. House from 1789 until his death in 1800. On February 5, 1791, Hartley became the first Pennsylvanian to join the bar of the Supreme Court of the United States when he took the oath in New York, where the court was then located. Hartley frequently attended social and official functions of President Washington and the First Lady. On July 2, 1791, Hartley greeted President Washington on the President's journey through York and hosted tea for the President at his house.

Hartley was among the original members of the Society of the Cincinnati and a trustee of Dickinson College. On April 28, 1800, he was appointed by Governor McKean as Major General of the Fifth Division of the state militia. Hartley was also a land prospector and purchased land in present-day Union County, Pennsylvania, which was previously part of Northumberland County. He helped lay out a town, now Hartleton, Pennsylvania, and adjoining Hartley Township was named for him.

== Death ==
Hartley died December 21, 1800, in York, Pennsylvania, shortly before the end of his sixth term in Congress, and was buried in St. John’s churchyard in York.

== See also ==
- List of members of the United States Congress who died in office (1790–1899)

U.S. House of Representatives
Preceded by District created	Member of the U.S. House of Representatives from Pennsylvania's at-large congressional district March 4, 1789 – March 3, 1791; Served alongside: George Clymer, Thomas Fitzsimons, Frederick A. C. Muhlenberg, Thomas Scott, Henry Wynkoop, Daniel Hiester, and Peter G. Muhlenberg	Succeeded by District eliminated
Preceded by District created	Member of the U.S. House of Representatives from Pennsylvania's 7th congressional district March 4, 1791 – March 3, 1793	Succeeded by District eliminated
Preceded by District created	Member of the U.S. House of Representatives from Pennsylvania's at-large congressional district March 4, 1793 – March 3, 1795; Served alongside: Thomas Fitzsimons, John W. Kittera, Frederick A. C. Muhlenberg, Thomas Scott, James Armstrong, Peter G. Muhlenberg, Andrew Gregg, Daniel Hiester, William Irvine, William Findley, John Smilie, and William Montgomery	Succeeded by District eliminated
Preceded by District created	Member of the U.S. House of Representatives from Pennsylvania's 8th congressional district March 4, 1795 – December 21, 1800	Succeeded by John Stewart
