= John W. Kittera =

American lawyer and politician (1752–1801)

John Wilkes Kittera
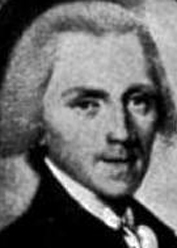

Member of the U.S. House of Representatives from Pennsylvania
- In office March 4, 1791 – March 3, 1801
- Preceded by: District created
- Succeeded by: Thomas Boude
- Constituency: 8th district (1791–1793); At-large district (1793–1795); 7th district (1795–1801)

Personal details
- Born: November , 1752 Blue Ball, Pennsylvania
- Died: June 6, 1801 (aged 48)
- Children: Thomas

John Wilkes Kittera (November 1752 – June 6, 1801) was an American lawyer and politician from Lancaster, Pennsylvania.

Kittera was born near Blue Ball, Pennsylvania. He was appointed by President John Adams as United States attorney for the United States District Court for the Eastern District of Pennsylvania. He represented Pennsylvania in the United States House of Representatives from 1791 until 1801.

While in the House, Kittera was appointed one of the House's impeachment managers in the impeachment proceedings against Senator William Blount.

He is the father of Thomas Kittera.

U.S. House of Representatives
Preceded by District created	Member of the U.S. House of Representatives from Pennsylvania's 8th congressional district March 4, 1791 – March 3, 1793	Succeeded by District eliminated
Preceded by District created	Member of the U.S. House of Representatives from Pennsylvania's at-large congressional district March 4, 1793 – March 3, 1795; Served alongside: Fitzsimons, Muhlenberg, Findley, Hartley, Scott, Armstrong, Muhlenberg, Gregg, Hiester, Irvine, Smilie & Montgomery	Succeeded by District eliminated
Preceded by District created	Member of the U.S. House of Representatives from Pennsylvania's 7th congressional district March 4, 1795 – March 3, 1801	Succeeded by Thomas Boude
