= Henry Wynkoop =

American politician (1737–1816)

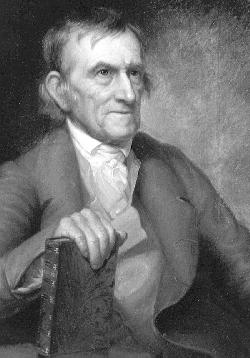

Member of the U.S. House of Representatives from Pennsylvania's At-large district
- In office March 4, 1789 – March 3, 1791

Personal details
- Born: March 2, 1737 Northampton Township, Province of Pennsylvania, British America
- Died: March 25, 1816 (aged 79) Bucks County, Pennsylvania, U.S.
- Resting place: Low Dutch Reformed Church, Richboro, Pennsylvania
- Party: Pro-Administration
- Occupation: judge

Henry Wynkoop (March 2, 1737 – March 25, 1816) was an American politician, who was member of the Continental Congress (from 1779) and later a United States representative for the Commonwealth of Pennsylvania during the First United States Congress, 1789 to 1791.

== Formative years and family ==
Wynkoop was born in Northampton Township in the Province of Pennsylvania on March 2, 1737. His father engaged in the practice of chattel slavery to operate the family's 153-acre farm in Newtown. Raised on the farm, Henry Wynkoop was subsequently admitted to Princeton University, but opted not to complete his studies, choosing instead to enter into local politics. In 1759, when his father died, he inherited both the farm and the people that his father had enslaved.

Wynkoop married three times and had eight children. In 1761, he wed Susannah Wanshaer, who died in 1776. In 1777, he wed Maria Cummings, who died in 1781. He then married his third wife, Sarah Newkirk, who died in 1813.

== Career ==
As a farm owner in Pennsylvania, Wynkoop benefitted financially from the practice of chattel slavery, as his father did before him.

Prior to his term as a representative, Wynkoop served as a justice of the Court of Common Pleas and the orphan's court in Kingston, Pennsylvania, from 1780 to 1789. After his term in Congress, he was appointed as an associate judge in Bucks County, a post he held until his death.

== Later years, death and interment ==
During his later years, Wynkoop created a will in which he decreed that, upon his death, the people he had been enslaving should be freed by manumission, a process which finally occurred on March 25, 1816, when he died in Bucks County. Some of the individuals who were freed stayed and continued to work for the family.

Following his death, Wynkoop was interred in the graveyard of the Low Dutch Reformed Church in Richboro, Pennsylvania.

U.S. House of Representatives
Preceded by None	Member of the U.S. House of Representatives from Pennsylvania's at-large congressional district 1789–1791	Succeeded by None
