= John Smilie =

American politician

John Smilie (1741 – December 30, 1812) was an Irish-American politician from Newtownards, County Down, Ireland. He served in both houses of the Pennsylvania state legislature and represented the commonwealth in the U.S. House from 1793 until 1795, and from 1799 to 1812.

John Smilie Signature

== Biography ==
Smilie was born in Ireland and immigrated to America on May 24, 1762, settling first in Lancaster County. He moved to Fayette in 1780. He was a prominent Jeffersonian and was identified with the "'Quid" branch of the party. In 1806–07, during the debates over the abolition of the slave trade, Smilie was among the most outspoken against the evils of the slave trade. He argued that slaves illegally imported after 1808 should be freed, and that slave smugglers deserved the death penalty. Neither provision was adopted.

In 1791, Smilie was elected a member of the American Philosophical Society.

=== Congress ===
He served in the U.S. House from 1793 until 1795, then again from 1799 to 1812. He was reelected in 1812 to serve in the Thirteenth Congress but died before it opened.

=== Death ===
He died in Washington, D.C., aged 71, and is buried in the Congressional Cemetery there.

== See also ==
- List of members of the United States Congress who died in office (1790–1899)

Political offices
Preceded by John Woods	Member, Supreme Executive Council of Pennsylvania, representing Fayette County; November 2, 1786 – November 19, 1789	Succeeded by Nathaniel Breading
U.S. House of Representatives
Preceded by None	Member of the U.S. House of Representatives from Pennsylvania's at-large congressional district 1793-1795	Succeeded by None
Preceded by William Findley	Member of the U.S. House of Representatives from Pennsylvania's 11th congressional district 1799–1803	Succeeded by John Baptiste Charles Lucas
Preceded by Andrew Gregg	Member of the U.S. House of Representatives from Pennsylvania's 9th congressional district 1803–1812	Succeeded by Isaac Griffin
