= William Irvine (general) =

Irish-American physician, soldier, and statesman (1741–1804)

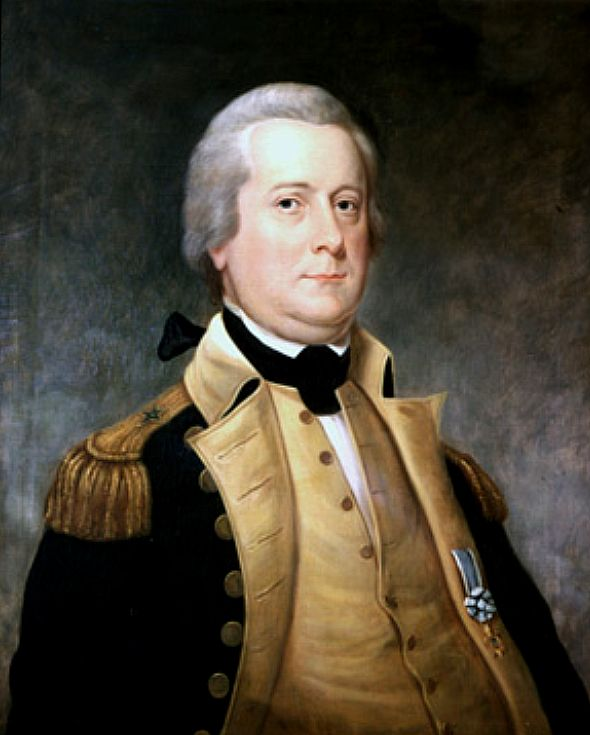
- Portrait by James Lambdin, 1860–1865

Member of the U.S. House of Representatives from Pennsylvania's at-large district
- In office March 4, 1793 – March 3, 1795
- Preceded by: None
- Succeeded by: None

Personal details
- Born: November 3, 1741 Enniskillen, County Fermanagh, Kingdom of Ireland
- Died: July 29, 1804 (aged 62) Philadelphia, Pennsylvania, U.S.
- Party: Anti-Administration
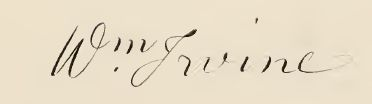
- Signature

Military service
- Allegiance: United States
- Branch/service: Continental Army
- Rank: Brigadier General
- Battles/wars: American Revolutionary War; Invasion of Quebec; Battle of Trois-Rivières (POW)

William Irvine (November 3, 1741 – July 29, 1804) was an Irish-born American physician, military officer, and politician. He served as a surgeon in the Royal Navy during the Seven Years' War before settling down in Carlisle, Pennsylvania. As tensions escalated between the Thirteen Colonies and the British government during the 1770s, Irvine sympathized and allied himself with the Patriot cause. He subsequently served as a brigadier general in Continental Army during the American Revolutionary War and served in the war's western theater. After the war Irvine served in the Continental Congress, and later played an active role in ending the Whiskey Rebellion in Pennsylvania. He also served one term in Congress representing Pennsylvania, and was also active in the state's other public affairs.

== Early life ==
William Irvine was born on November 3, 1741 near Enniskillen, in County Fermanagh, Ireland into a Scots-Irish Presbyterian family. He studied medicine and classical literature at Trinity College Dublin under George Cleghorn, who would later vouch for Irvine's competency and knowledge of medicine. Thereafter he was admitted to practice where he served as a surgeon on a Royal Navy warship during the Seven Years' War. In 1763 he immigrated to the British colonies in America and settled in Carlisle, Pennsylvania. That year he became a delegate to the State Revolutionary conventions held in 1764–1766. In 1772 he married Ann Callender, daughter of Captain Robert Callender, a prominent citizen of Carlisle whom Irvine held in high regard and named his first son after. Irvine had two brothers, Andrew who was an officer in the Continental Army, and Matthew, who was a physician and a surgeon in General Charles Lee's division. His son, Callender, (Note: After his father, William, died in 1804 Callender succeeded him as superintendent of military stores. In 1812 he became the commissary of purchases for the army.) was born in 1774 and became a captain of artillery and engineers in 1798. Callender would later manage his father's estate at Brokenstraw when Irvine's political appointment required that he move to Philadelphia. His second son, William, (Note: Born in Pennsylvania; Date of birth not listed) enlisted in the army as a captain of light artillery in 1808, and later fought in the War of 1812. Irvine's youngest son, Armstrong, (Note: Born in Pennsylvania; Date of birth not listed) also served in the War of 1812, as Adjutant General of the Militia of the Commonwealth of Pennsylvania. (Note: Armstrong died at Fort Warren in 1817.) Throughout his military career Irvine was an avid letter writer and, aside from his military correspondence, corresponded regularly with his wife Ann and children.

== American Revolution ==
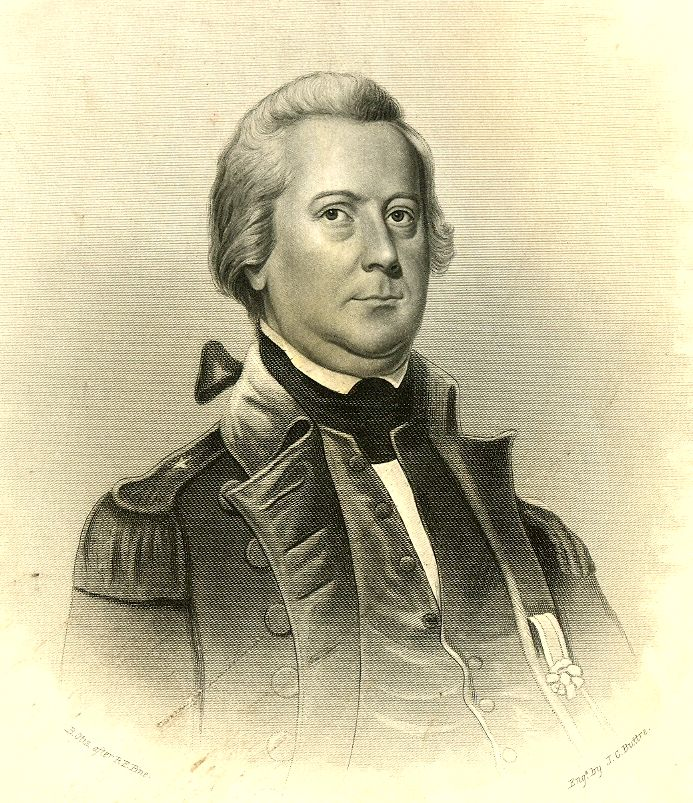
General William Irvine Engraving modeled after 1788 painting

Irvine served as a brigadier general in the Continental Army during the American Revolutionary War and served under General George Washington, with whom he frequently corresponded. Irvine represented Pennsylvania in both the Continental Congress (1787–88) and after the war, in the United States House of Representatives (1793–1795). He served as a ship's surgeon and settled in Carlisle. He was elected to the Pennsylvania Assembly which granted him a colonel's commission in January 1776 for the purpose of raising the 6th Pennsylvania Regiment. On June 16 of that year he was captured, along with a large number of his fellow officers and men, in Canada at the Battle of Three Rivers during the Lake Champlain campaign and was not exchanged until May 6, 1778. In May 1779 he was promoted to brigadier general of the 2nd Pennsylvania Regiment and arrived in Pittsburgh in November.

On September 25, 1781, Irvine received orders from Congress to command the Western Department of the Continental Army, which was headquartered at Fort Pitt. Although Lord Cornwallis had already surrendered at Yorktown in October 1781, effectively ending the fighting in the east and virtually ending the war, the conflict on the western frontier continued. Irvine soon learned that the Americans living on the frontier wanted the army to launch an expedition against Detroit to end ongoing British support for the American Indian war parties. Irvine investigated, then wrote to General George Washington, on December 2, 1781, and maintained:

"It is, I believe, universally agreed that the only way to keep Indians from harassing the country is to visit them. But we find, by experience, that burning their empty towns has not the desired effect. They can soon build others. They must be followed up and beaten, or the British, whom they draw their support from, totally driven out of their country. I believe if Detroit was demolished, it would be a good step toward giving some, at least, temporary ease to this country."

Washington agreed with Irvine's assessment that the British in Detroit had to be neutralized or driven out to effectively end the war in the west. Irvine sent Washington a detailed plan for an offensive in February 1782, that with an estimated 2,000 men, five artillery pieces and a supply caravan, he could move on Detroit and capture it. Subsequently, Irvine convinced Colonel William Crawford to come out of retirement and lead an expedition against Indians in villages along the Sandusky River, which ended in Crawford's brutal execution. The militia troops went back under the command of John Rose, a Baltic German officer from Estonia. Irvine was commander at Fort Pitt, replacing Colonel Daniel Brodhead. Upon assuming command he discovered and later complained about, the poor condition of the garrison at the fort. Upon his arrival to Fort Pitt, he was appalled to find the fort in "a heap of ruins" from annual flooding, and its garrison in such an extremely ragged state. In a letter, dated December 2, 1781, to General Washington Irvine reported, "I never saw troops cut so truly a deplorable, and at the same time despicable, a figure. Indeed, when I arrived, no man would believe from their appearance that they were soldiers..." Maintaining that the fort was untenable Irving wrote to Congress and strongly recommended that a new fort be built four miles down stream near the mouth of Chartiers Creek by the Ohio River. Irvine maintained that this location was inapproachable on three sides, no commanding ground on its fourth, and that the proposed location would have command of both the creek and the Ohio River. Congress being nearly bankrupt declined Irvine's proposition and ignored his other recommendations. Irvine soon received a letter of reply from Washington, dated December 18, that he was "not at all surprised", but explained that under the circumstances involving disputes over command, and issue concerning other involved interests, this was to be expected, and as such the decision to relocate must rest with the Congress.

Irvine became a member of the Continental Congress in 1786 and was selected with John Kean and Nicholas Gilman for settling the accounts of the U.S. Government with the several states.

== Later life ==
Irvine unsuccessfully ran for the U.S. Senate in 1788 and the 7th congressional district in 1791, and was later elected as a U.S. representative from Pennsylvania in the 3rd Congress, serving from December 2, 1793, to March 3, 1795. In 1797 he was sent to Pennsylvania as a commissioner to resolve the disputes involving the Whiskey Rebellion. When he failed in that effort he was assigned as commander of the militia troops and ultimately brought an end to the Whiskey Rebellion.

Irvine continued his involvement in Pennsylvania's public life, overseeing and directing the distribution of lands that were donated to war veterans. He served two terms in Congress, serving in Pennsylvania's constitutional convention, and was on the board of commissioners which settled financial accounts between the various states and the newly established federal government. In the 1790s, Irvine played a significant role in surveying lands and laying out the boundaries of towns in western Pennsylvania.

Irvine purchased several tracts of land near the mouth of Brokenstraw Creek at the Allegheny River, some of which he gave to his son Callender. The area would soon grow into and become the town of Warren, Pennsylvania. Irvine's eldest son, Callender Irvine cultivated the land, established a general store nearby, and built a fine house on a bluff which overlooked the river. The estate came to be known as "Brokenstraw" which became the home and center of business for three generations of Irvine's descendants. Callender's son, Dr. William A. Irvine (1803–1886), expanded the store and diversified the family business, adding an iron foundry, a saw mill, a woolen mill, and eventually a few oil wells. This location is where the Irvine family's careers and lives centered over the next four generations. Irvine was the plaintiff in the Supreme Court case Irvine v. Sims's Lessee which involved conflicting land claims between Irvine who had been granted Montour's Island by Pennsylvania for his service in the Revolutionary War, and Charles Simms of Virginia. The Court unanimously found in favor of Simms, who had the earlier claim.

In September 1790, Irvine became business partners with John and Charles Wilkens of Pittsburgh, "to carry on a special trade and business in buying and selling". Most of their investments were made in flour and whiskey which were mostly sold in the Ohio and upper Mississippi Valleys.

In the late 1790s, Irvine assumed a military role one last time, in response to another tax rebellion. During 1797, rising tensions between France and the United States led the American government to seek financing with which to improve the military and prepare for what became the Quasi-War. To fund the war Congress levied a tax on houses and other property. The new tax came to be known as the window tax, based on the size of a house as determined by the number of windows. In response, citizens rebelled in what came to be called the Fries Rebellion which primarily involved the Dutch in Pennsylvania. Some tax collectors were driven out of towns and even imprisoned. To put down the rebellion President Adams ordered troops to move in and arrest the various men responsible. Irvine joined the company marching for Quakertown. Irvine wrote to a friend, "The rust of time and age creeping on me, will I fear make me awkward in this business." Despite his reservations, however, Irvine endured the ordeal and returned home safely. The rebellion would be Irvine's final active military service, though he continued working with the military. In 1801, he was appointed superintendent of military stores in Philadelphia.

In 1801 Irvine was elected president of the State Society of the Cincinnati and held that office up until the time of his death.

Irvine died on July 29, 1804, in Philadelphia, Pennsylvania, where he was buried in a graveyard near Independence Hall. He was reburied in 1833 at the new Ronaldson's Cemetery. When it was closed in the 1950s, the graves of a few Revolutionary War officers such as Irvine were identified by the rector of Old Swedes' and reburied at Gloria Dei Church cemetery. (Note: Old Swedes' Church and its graveyard are considered to be the oldest in Pennsylvania. The church was constructed by early Swedish settlers in 1698. Today it is a national historic site managed by the National Park Service.)

== Papers ==
Most of Irvine's correspondence and other papers were passed on to his sons. His son William took possession of most of the letters that were addressed to Irvine, while the letters written by Irvine naturally ended up in a variety of places, including those among the Washington Papers. Irvine's correspondence from the early 1790s also includes discussions about the staff and curriculum at Dickinson College in Carlisle, Pennsylvania, the improvement of inland navigation in Pennsylvania, the aftermath of the French Revolution, and Irvine's business ventures with his business partners Charles and John Wilkins, Junior, of Pittsburgh. Much of his correspondence, including the Irvine-Newbold papers, are archived at the Historical Society of Pennsylvania.

== See also ==
- James Irvine (Pennsylvania politician)

== Bibliography ==
- Buttlerfield, Consul Willshire (1873). An historical account of the expedition against Sandusky under Col. William Crawford in 1782. Cincinnati, Robert Clarke & Co.
- Buttlerfield, Consul Willshire (1882). Washington-Irvine correspondence. Madison, Wisconsin, David Atwood.
- Chernow, Ron (2005). Alexander Hamilton. Penguin Press. ISBN 978-1-1012-0085-8.
- Fiske, John; Wilson, James Grant (1887). Appleton's Cyclopædia of American Biography. Vol. 3. D. Appleton and company.
- Nester, William R. (2004). The Frontier War for American Independence. Stackpole Books. ISBN 978-0-8117-0077-1.
- Ostler, Jeffery (October 2015). "To Extirpate the Indians": An Indigenous Consciousness of Genocide in the Ohio Valley and Lower Great Lakes, 1750s–1810". The William and Mary Quarterly. 72 (74). Omohundro Institute of Early American History and Culture: 587–622. doi:10.5309/willmaryquar.72.4.0587. JSTOR 72.4.0587. S2CID 146642401.
- Ridner, Judith (April 2001). "William Irvine and the Complexities of Manhood and Fatherhood in the Pennsylvania Backcountry". The Pennsylvania Magazine of History and Biography. 125 (1/2). University of Pennsylvania Press: 5–34. JSTOR 20093425.
- Taylor, Alan (2016). American Revolutions A Continental History, 1750–1804. W.W. Norton & Company. ISBN 978-0-393-35476-8.
- Reports of Decisions in the Supreme Court of the United States : [1790-1854]. Vol. 1. United States. Supreme Court, Benjamin Robbins Curtis Little, Brown. 1870.
- Biographical Directory of the United States Congress. United States government Printing Office. 2021 [1859].
- Heim, Sarah, ed. (2005). Irvine-Newbold Family Papers (PDF). The Historical Society of Pennsylvania. "Irvine-Newbold Family Papers, 1766-1955 (bulk 1775-1880) 77 boxes, 232 vols., 60 lin. feet, Collection 1890"
- "Dr. William Irvine, Brigadier General, American Revolutionary Army". Irvineclan.com.
- Jensen, Merrill; Becker, Robert, eds. (1976). The First Federal Elections 1788-1790: Congress, South Carolina, Pennsylvania, Massachusetts, New Hampshire. Vol. 1. University of Wisconsin Press. ISBN 0299066908.

U.S. House of Representatives
Preceded by None	Member of the U.S. House of Representatives from Pennsylvania's at-large congressional district 1793-1795	Succeeded by None
