= Andrew Gregg =

American politician (1755–1835)

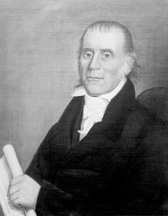

President pro tempore of the United States Senate
- In office June 26, 1809 – December 18, 1809
- Preceded by: John Milledge
- Succeeded by: John Gaillard

United States Senator from Pennsylvania
- In office March 4, 1807 – March 4, 1813
- Preceded by: George Logan
- Succeeded by: Abner Lacock

Member of the U.S. House of Representatives from Pennsylvania
- In office March 4, 1791 – March 3, 1807
- Preceded by: Joseph Hiester
- Succeeded by: Daniel Montgomery Jr.
- Constituency: 6th district (1791–1793) at-large district (Seat F) (1793–1795); 9th district (1795–1803); 5th district (1803–1807)

Personal details
- Born: June 10, 1755 Carlisle, Province of Pennsylvania, British America
- Died: May 20, 1835 (aged 79) Bellefonte, Pennsylvania, U.S.
- Party: Democratic-Republican
- Spouse: Martha Potter
- Children: 11

Andrew Gregg (June 10, 1755 – May 20, 1835) was an American politician. A Democratic-Republican, he served as a United States senator from Pennsylvania from 1807 until 1813. Prior to that, he served as a U.S. representative from 1791 until 1807. From June to December 1809, he served briefly as President pro tempore of the United States Senate.

Gregg was born on June 10, 1755, in Carlisle in the Province of Pennsylvania. His father was Andrew Gregg (1710–1789), and his mother was Jane Scott (1725–1783).

He married Martha Potter, the daughter of Major General James Potter. The couple had 11 children. His son, Andrew Gregg Jr., built the Andrew Gregg Homestead about 1825.

He served as a United States Congressman from Pennsylvania from 1791 until 1813: first, in the United States House of Representatives from October 24, 1791, until March 4, 1807, and then in the United States Senate from October 26, 1807, until March 4, 1813. During part of his service in the Senate, he served as President pro tempore.

He was appointed secretary of state for Pennsylvania, in 1816, and ran unsuccessfully for Governor of Pennsylvania in 1823. Prior to his election to the United States Congress, he had served in the militia during the American Revolution, and had been a tutor at the College of Philadelphia, from 1779 to 1783. Two of his grandsons, Andrew Gregg Curtin and James Xavier McLanahan, were prominent Pennsylvania politicians.

== Death and legacy ==
Gregg died May 20, 1835, in Bellefonte, Pennsylvania, in Centre County, at the age of 79, and was buried in Union Cemetery.

Two Pennsylvania townships are named after Gregg, one in Centre County, and one in Union County (previously part of Lycoming County).

Party political offices
Preceded by Joseph Hiester	Federalist nominee for Governor of Pennsylvania; 1823	Succeeded by John Sergeant
U.S. House of Representatives
Preceded by District created	Member of the U.S. House of Representatives from Pennsylvania's 6th congressional district March 4, 1791 – March 3, 1793	Succeeded by District eliminated
Preceded by Joseph Hiester	Member of the U.S. House of Representatives from Pennsylvania's at-large congressional district March 4, 1793 – March 3, 1795	Succeeded by Daniel Montgomery, Jr.
Preceded by District created	Member of the U.S. House of Representatives from Pennsylvania's 9th congressional district March 4, 1795 – March 3, 1803	Succeeded by John Smilie
U.S. Senate
Preceded by George Logan	U.S. senator (Class 3) from Pennsylvania; 1807 – 1813; Served alongside: Samuel Maclay, Michael Leib	Succeeded by Abner Lacock
Political offices
Preceded by John Milledge	President pro tempore of the U.S. Senate; June 26, 1809 – December 18, 1809	Succeeded by John Gaillard
