= Joe Creek =

Joe Creek may refer to:

- Joe Creek (Oklahoma), a stream in Tulsa County, Oklahoma
- Joe Creek (South Dakota), a stream in Hughes County, South Dakota
- Joe Creek, South Dakota, an unincorporated community in Hughes County, South Dakota

== See also ==
- Joes Creek, West Virginia
