= Sanford House (Sioux City, Iowa) =

Historic house in Iowa, United States

- U.S. National Register of Historic Places
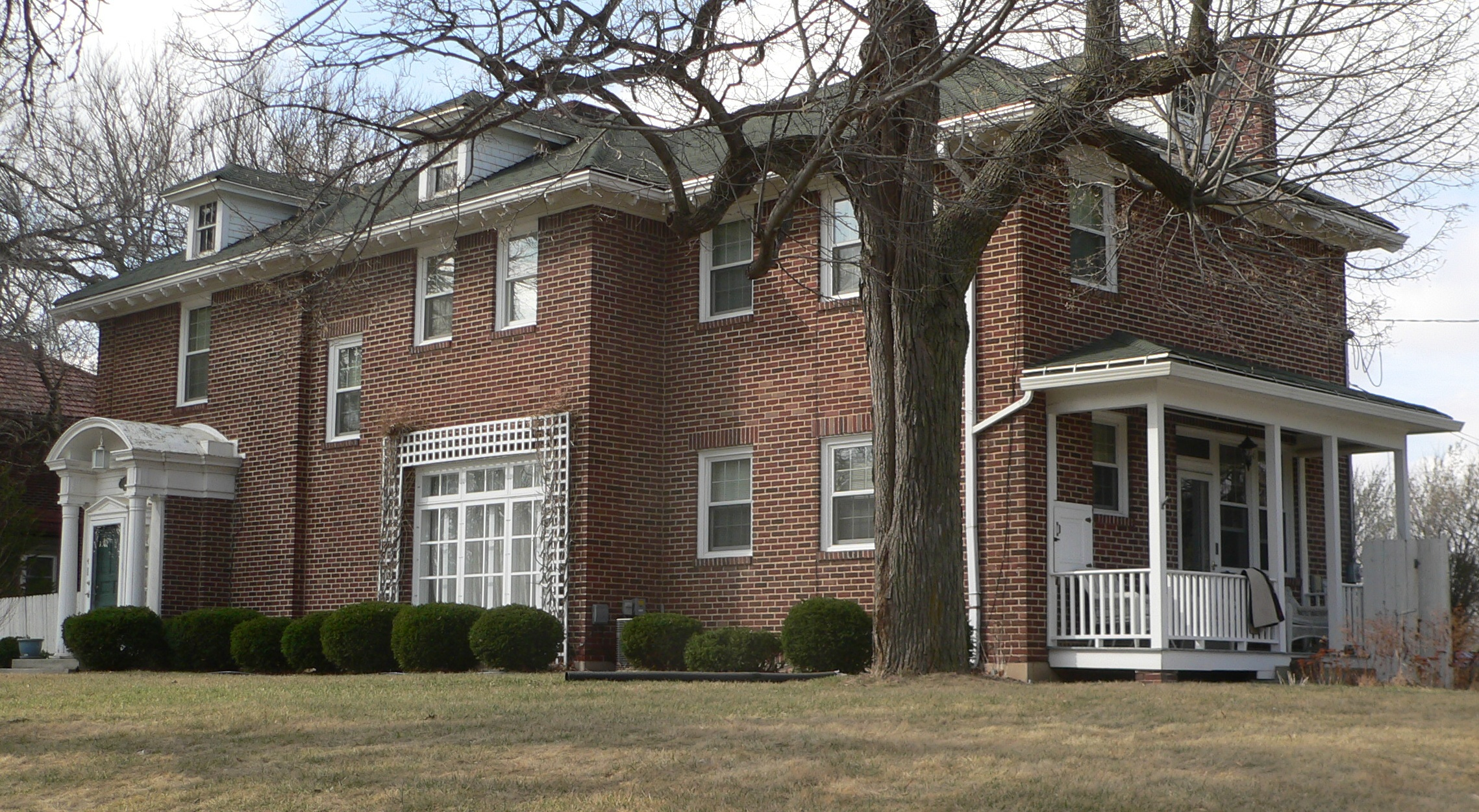
- View of front from northeast corner

- Location within Iowa Location within the United States
- Location: 1925 Summit Street; Sioux City, Iowa
- Coordinates: 42°30′39″N 96°24′36″W
- Area: .50 acres (0.20 ha)
- Built: 1914
- Built by: Andrew Ostling
- Architectural style: Neocolonial
- NRHP reference No.: 03000359
- Added to NRHP: March 21, 2003

The Sanford House, also known as the Stone House and Summit Mansion, is a historic residence in Sioux City, Iowa. Throughout the 1990s, it was commonly referred to as the “Home Alone house” in reference to the similar looking neocolonial residence featured in the eponymous film that had become a pop culture phenomenon.

The house was built in 1914 by Lucia Stone in honor of her deceased husband, Edgar Stone, for $34,500 (equivalent to $880,000 in 2018). It was restored by Dr. John and Rebecca Marriott from 1994 to 1999 and submitted to the National Register of Historic Places by John and Kathy Pritchard on August 16, 2001. It was admitted on March 21, 2003 for the historical impact its various owners and their families have had on Sioux City; particularly Arthur Sanford, an entrepreneur who was named “Sioux City’s Greatest Builder” in 1954 that had “exercised more influence on Sioux City’s landscape than any other individual”. He is associated with the development, financing, and or management of approximately $400,000,000 (2018 inflation-adjusted) in real estate over the course of his career. Six of his properties are also listed on the National Register of Historic Places.

Along with his wife, Stella, Arthur was also a prominent philanthropist who donated approximately $5,000,000 (2018 inflation-adjusted) to various causes throughout their lives with the “aim and ambition to do everything to make opportunities for the younger men and women of Sioux City”. Arthur was also very involved in politics, participating six Democratic national conventions, and hosted John F. Kennedy at the Sanford House during the 1960 United States presidential campaign.

== Architecture and design ==
Constructed in 1914 by Swedish immigrant Andrew Ostling, the Sanford House is predominately an example of neocolonial architecture from the Colonial Revival movement with Prairie influence. The architect is unknown, but potentially Joseph E. Wing. Officially two stories (the first floor 2,170 sq. ft and second floor 1,908 sq. ft), it also features a 2,138 sq. ft finished basement, and a 600 sq. ft semi-finished third floor attic for a total size of 6,816 square feet. It has 4 bedrooms, 5 bathrooms, 2 fireplaces, and a sunroom that was added in the 1980s. The north wing of the house is a dedicated servants' quarters which includes a bedroom and bathroom on the second floor, kitchen on the first floor, and a scullery with built-in mangle, serving panty, and coal bunker in the basement. In the Marriott era, the coal bunker was converted to an office. Connecting the servant floors is a dumbwaiter and private stairwell. Every room is also connected to the servants' quarters via bell pull system. In the Sanford era, a mural by Elsa (née Krome) Nourse, an apprentice of Carl Gustaf Nelson, was added to the foyer and grand staircase.

== Owners ==
- 1914-1920: Lucia Stone (philanthropist)
- 1920-1922: Dr. J. E. Moore (surgeon)
- 1922-1934: George and Mary Avery (entrepreneur; Avery Lumber Company)
- 1936-1982: Arthur and Stella Sanford (entrepreneur; Arthur Sanford & Company)
- 1982-1987: Dr. Alexander and June Kleider (neurosurgeon)
- 1987-1990: Dr: Quentin and Barbara-Anne Huculak Durward (neurosurgeon)
- 1990-1994: Dr. Leonel and Yolanda Herrera (neurologist)
- 1994-1999: Dr. John and Rebecca Marriott (radiologist)
- 2000-2014: John and Kathy Pritchard (technologist; Catalyst Solutions)
- 2014–Present: Unknown

=== Stone Era ===
On May 28, 1884, Lucia Wright, daughter of George G. Wright, married Edgar Heathcote Stone. Edgar attended Lake Forest Academy and graduated from Yale University with honors in 1878. His classmate and lifelong friend was William Howard Taft.

View of front upon completion in 1915 from northeast corner

Edgar's father, Thomas Jefferson Stone, was among the first settlers of Sioux City in 1856 and helped survey, acquire, and finance much of its early land development. In 1871, Thomas co-founded the First National Bank of Sioux City with Asahel W. Hubbard and served as its president. Among his many civic contributions are the creation of the Sergeant Floyd Monument and eponymous Stone State Park. Upon his death in 1904, Thomas bequeathed Edgar and Lucia approximately one-third of his $400,000 estate (equivalent to $10,000,000 in 2018).

Edgar, who had been suffering from a rheumatic disorder for years, unexpectedly died in 1911 leaving Lucia a widow without children. In his honor, Lucia donated 800 acres of Thomas’ estate for the creation on Stone State Park, the land to the Sisters of St. Benedict for which MercyOne Siouxland Medical Center now stands, and the development of a mansion atop of the city's summit. On July 15, 1914, she purchased two lots on the corner on Twentieth and Summit streets from W. L. Frost for $4,500. Construction by builder Andrew Oustling was finished in 1915 totaling $30,000 for a total development cost of $34,500 (equivalent to $880,000 in 2018).

Lucia sold the Stone House to surgeon Dr. J. E. Moore in 1920 and married prominent attorney Thomas G. Henderson in 1921. She unexpectedly died in 1922 and Thomas jumped to his death off the Davidson Building in 1925, which Arthur Sanford helped develop.

=== Sanford Era ===
Arthur and Stella Sanford acquired the Sanford House in 1936 from lumber baron George and Mary Avery. Arthur was born in Minneapolis to Austrian-Jewish immigrants James and Edith Sanford and was immersed in business from birth at his father's mercantile store. He dropped-out of the University of Minnesota and Wharton School of Finance and Commerce. He interned at Brown Brothers Harriman & Co and served in World War I as a sergeant major in a logistics casual company in Paris.

Kennedy and the Sanfords outside the Sanford House north wing, 1960

On July 3, 1920, he married Stella Wolff, daughter of air conditioning pioneer Alfred Rudolph Wolff, who had just graduated from the Massachusetts Institute of Technology. The same year he established Arthur Stanford & Co to sell mortgage bonds, which he later expanded to development and management of real estate. When the Sioux Apartment Hotel fell into receivership, Arthur and Stella permanently relocated to Sioux City to salvage the venture. Over the next 60 years, Arthur was associated with the development, financing, and or management of approximately $400,000,000 (2018 inflation-adjusted) in real estate in Iowa, Illinois, Nebraska, California, Texas, and New York. Six of those properties are now listed on the National Register of Historic Places. In 1954, Arthur was named “Sioux City’s Greatest Builder” who had “exercised more influence on Sioux City’s landscape than any other individual”.

In Sioux City, he is associated with the Orpheum Electric Building, Warrior Hotel, Masonic Temple, Davidson Building, Insurance Exchange Building, Frances Building, Shaare Zion Synagogue, Sioux Apartment Hotel, Bellevue Apartment, Argonaut Apartment, Castle-Stellart Apartment, Metz Apartment, Nyol Apartment, 5 theaters, two-subdivisions, and the bus terminal.

In Des Moines, he is associated with The Commodore, Des Moines Building, Bolton Apartments, Windsor Terrace Apartments, Fleming Building and 3660 Grand Ave. Also, The Inn Hotel at Lake Okoboji, Hotel Tallcorn in Marshalltown, Chieftain Hotel in Council Bluffs and Sherman House Hotel and the Ambassador East in Chicago.

A serial entrepreneur, Arthur was also involved in many other ventures. In 1928, he co-founded Mid-Continent Airlines with Arthur Hanford, Jr. It was acquired by Braniff International Airways in 1952. In 1929, he gained 60% control of the hog cholera vaccine market by consolidating five of the largest serum producers into Allied Laboratories, which was acquired by Dow Chemical. In 1941, he co-founded the Sioux Soya Mills Company with Francis Lytle. It was the first soybean processing plant in Iowa and was acquired by Cargill in 1947.

In 1947, Arthur and Stella established the Stellart Charitable Foundation with the “aim and ambition to do everything to make opportunities for the younger men and women of Sioux City”. They donated approximately $5,000,000 (2018 inflation-adjusted) to various causes over the ensuing years, including the $150,000 (equivalent to $1,700,000 in 2018) for redevelopment of the Booker T. Washington Center, which was renamed the Sanford Community Center. Approximately $25,000 (equivalent to $205,000 in 2018) for renovations of the Mary Treglia Community Center. Another $77,000 (equivalent to $586,000 in 2018) for the Sanford Organ in Eppley Auditorium of Morningside College in 1967, and $150,000 (equivalent to $946,000 in 2018) for the Stella Sanford Day Care Center in 1971.

Starting in 1940, Arthur was also very involved in politics and served as the Iowa delegate in six Democratic national conventions. In 1950 he served as a United States delegate to the International Labor Organization conference in Geneva. In 1952 and 1956 he was the Iowa finance chairman for presidential candidate Adlai Stevenson II. In 1959 he served as chairman of Governor Loveless’ United Nations committee. While serving as the Iowa finance chairman during the 1960 United States presidential campaign, Arthur hosted presidential candidate John F. Kennedy at the Sanford House. In 1966, he served as chairman of the reception committee for Senator Robert Kennedy at the Orpheum Theater he built. He also served on many commissions, committees, and campaign teams.

Following Arthur and Stella's deaths in 1981, the Sanford House was sold to neurosurgeon Dr. Alexander and June Kleider.

=== Marriott Era ===
==== Dr. John and Rebecca Marriott ====
A third-generation Sioux native, Dr. John Thomas Marriott II and his wife, Rebecca (née Beelman) Marriott, acquired the Sanford House on June 20, 1994, from neurologist Dr. Leonel and Yolanda Herrera. Following a decorated combat deployment to Panama for the war on drugs and a radiology residency in Ohio, John returned to Sioux City to join the Sioux City Radiological Group.

The counterculture movement kicked off by President Kennedy's administration, whom the Sanford's ironically helped elect, caused neocolonial style to not only become unpopular, but loathed. The Sanford House was not immune and the “old world” elegance of hardwood floors and crystal chandeliers gave-way to 1960s decor. Aside of the sunroom added by the Herra's in the 1980s, the house remained untouched until the Marriott's acquisition in 1994. Over the next 5 years, Rebecca and general contractor Gary Bender, restored every room, fixture, and decor to its neocolonial roots. The entire basement was refinished and the coal bunker was converted to an office. The house was commonly referred to as "Marriott Manor" by the contractors.

In July 1998, their son, Thomas Montgomery Marriott, establish his first startup, Penny Computer Company, in the Sanford House basement. Fulfilling his great-grandfather's original dream, John and Rebecca sold the Sanford House to technologist John and Kathy Pritchard on August 16, 1999, and moved to The Antebellum in Grogan's Point of The Woodlands, Texas; leaving 147 years and 6 generations of roots behind.

==== Dr. Charles Montgomery Marriott ====
John's father, Dr. Charles Montgomery Marriott, was a radiologist and multi-decorated World War II hero who co-founded the Sioux City Radiological Group in 1956. Overcoming the loss of both hands from a stielhandgranate while saving his platoon during the Rhineland Offensive, he practiced diagnostic and nuclear interventional radiology in Sioux City for 27 years. He also served on the board of directors, as chief of staff, and as department head of radiation therapy at St. Vincent's Hospital (now MercyOne Siouxland Medical Center). He was a Fellow of the American College of Radiology and Diplomat of the American Board of Radiology. Most of his career was focused on awareness and treatment of cancer. As chapter president of the American Cancer Society, he was instrumental in bringing and practicing advanced cancer treatment to Sioux City, including external beam radiotherapy from cobalt and linear acceleration, and the first CAT Scanner in Iowa (tenth in the United States). He regularly spoke at schools for anti-smoking campaigns. In 1964, he co-developed the 14 acre, 8 building Medical Plaza Professional Center on Hamilton Boulevard. During his retirement, Charles helped establish and was president of the Sioux City Convention Center. He was bestowed the Sertoma International "Service to Mankind" award in 1992. Charles grew up on 15 Gilman Terrace, two blocks from the Sanford House, and was George Avery's paperboy for the Sioux City Tribune. His wife and two daughters survived the Flight 982 crash at the Sioux Gateway Airport in 1968.

==== Secretary William Henry Marriott ====
Charles’ father, William Henry Marriott, Esq. was a prominent grain trade executive with the Terminal Grain Corporation (now Tegra Corporation) who served as the Secretary of the Sioux City Grain Exchange. He was instrumental in opening commercial barge navigation of the Missouri River and establishing the Missouri River Basin Project, including the Gavins Point Dam. He came to Sioux City from Wakefield, a frontier settlement his father helped pioneer. William was immersed in business and the grain trade from birth at his father's store, Marriott Mercantile, which initially specialized in quality "Seeds that grow!" thirty-five years before the Grain Standards Act of 1916. He attended Brown's Business College at 17 years of age while working for the Great Northern Railway. Suffering from poor health following a botched appendicitis surgery in 1915, William wore an abdominal binder for the rest of his life and unexpectedly died in 1951.

==== Judge John Thomas Marriott I ====
William's father, Judge John Thomas Marriott I, was among the first settlers of Wakefield, Nebraska in July 1881. The son of English immigrants William and Sarah (née Pacey) Marriott, John became motherless and an only child at one year old when Sarah suffered maternal death. Described as a “hustler” who can “raise anything from peanuts to presidents”, he was determined to make Wakefield rival Sioux City, whose population was around 7,500 at the time. He built and operated the first store, Marriott Mercantile, for 42 years. Initially specializing in “Seeds that grow!”, he expanded to groceries, lands loans and insurance, conveyance, collections, brokerage and notary services. The store also operated a millinery led by his wife Mary Louise (née Rice) Marriott, the sister of James Montgomery Rice, aunt of Montgomery Case, and great-granddaughter of William Montgomery. At peak, John controlled approximately 20% of Wakefield's commercial real estate and a cattle farm on the outskirt. He adopted the new slogan "Marriott Means Business".

In 1906, John helped bring Wakefield into the electric age. On the Board of Education, he helped introduce formal academics to Wakefield and as a Justice of the peace, helped create laws for the horseless carriage. As of 2018, the Presbyterian Church he built on 3rd Street continues to assemble its congregation every Sunday. Their daughter, Caroline Montgomery Marriott, was killed by the Spanish Flu epidemic in 1918. Distraught, John suffered a severe stroke in February 1921 and remained in a coma for fourteen weeks. When he regained consciousness, he could no longer speak and his health continued to fail until his death in September 1923. Marriott Mercantile now operates as an online corporate store for Marriott Corporation operated by his great-great-grandson Thomas Montgomery Marriott.
