= Montgomery Case =

American civil engineer (1882–1953)

Montgomery B. Case
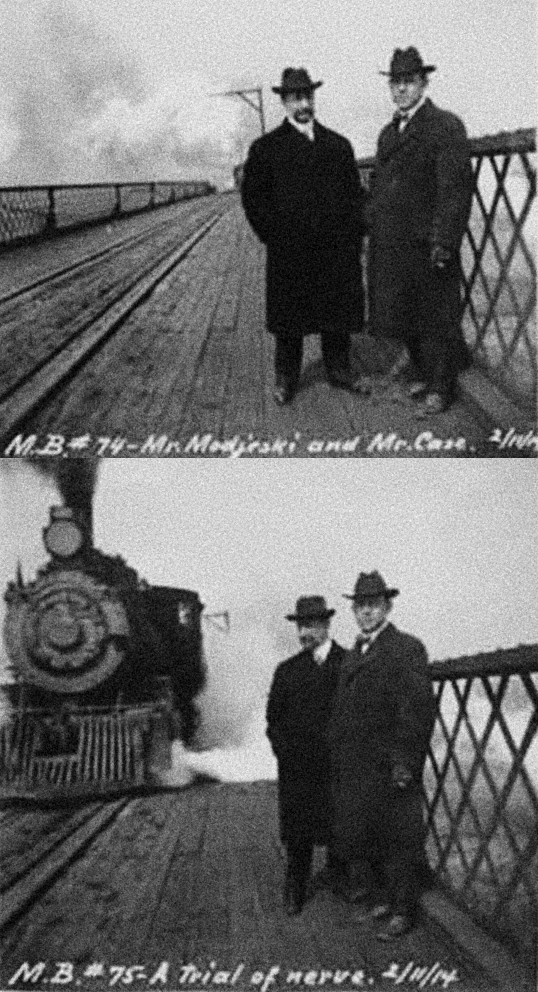
- Born: February 11, 1882; Monmouth, Illinois, US
- Died: May 7, 1953 (aged 71); Englewood, New Jersey, US
- Education: University of Illinois
- Occupation: Civil engineer
- Known for: George Washington Bridge
- Spouse: Maybelle B. Case (m.1910-1945)
- Relatives: William Montgomery (3rd great-grandfather); Daniel Montgomery Jr. (3rd great-uncle); James Montgomery Rice (uncle); Charles Montgomery Marriott (cousin)

Montgomery Babcock Case (February 11, 1882 — May 7, 1953) was an American civil engineer, bridge builder, and partner of Modjeski and Masters, the oldest bridge engineering firm in the United States. He is associated with the development of 14 bridges. As of 2018, they cumulatively transit over 400 million vehicles per year.

His most notable project, the George Washington Bridge, achieved multiple world records including span length, cofferdam size, and use of deflection; earning the designation "Eighth Wonder of the World." Le Corbusier called it "the most beautiful bridge in the world." As of 2018, it is the busiest motor vehicle bridge on earth, transiting over 1 billion vehicles from 2008 to 2018. It is also home to the world's largest free-flying American flag and was featured on the History Channel series Modern Marvels.

Case was named after his third great-grandfather, William Montgomery, who was a colonel in the America Revolutionary War. During the New York and New Jersey Campaign, Colonel Montgomery's regiment retreated from Fort Washington across the Hudson River to Fort Lee. One hundred and fifty one years later, Case erected the George Washington Bridge at the same location.

== Career ==
Montgomery Case was born in Monmouth, Illinois, to Lyman and Carrie (née Rice) Case. His uncle, Thomas Munger, was a major influence on his career. From his guidance, Case attended the University of Nebraska from 1902 to 1904 and graduated from the University of Illinois in 1906 with a bachelor of science in civil engineering. He was a member of Delta Tau Delta. After graduation, he married Maybelle Betsy McConnell (b.1880—d.1945) in 1910 and began working with Ralph Modjeski on the Columbia River Railroad Bridge, followed by several more projects into the early 1920s. Throughout the 1920s he worked with Othmar Ammann. Following the death of Clement E. Chase, who was killed during an inspection of the Benjamin Franklin Bridge, Case returned to Modjeski in 1933 and became a full partner alongside Frank M. Masters, forming Modjeski, Masters, and Case. He retired in 1940.

Case also served as an advisor to the War Manpower Commission, chief construction engineer for the Port Authority of New York and New Jersey, and regularly lectured at Princeton University. He was a member of American Society of Civil Engineers and American Railway Bridge and Building Association.

== Associated projects ==
- Columbia River Railroad Bridge (1906)
- Celilo Bridge (1910)
- Cherry Street Bridge (1911)
- Harahan Bridge (1913)
- Cincinnati Southern Bridge (1916)
- Metropolis Bridge (1917)
- Hotel Pennsylvania (1917)
- War Department Nitrate Plant No 3 (1918)
- Benjamin Franklin Bridge (1921)
- George Washington Bridge (1927)
- Goethals Bridge (1928)
- Bayonne Bridge (1930)
- Lincoln Tunnel (1931)
- San Francisco–Oakland Bay Bridge (1932)
- Interstate 74 Bridge Bridge (1933)
- Huey P. Long Bridge (1935)
- Duke Ellington Bridge (1935)

== Media ==
- "Bridging Urban America, The Story of Ralph Modjeski" (2016)
- History Channel, Modern Marvels, Season 11, Episode 34 "George Washington Bridge" (2004)
