= Sioux City Grain Exchange =

Coordinates: 42°29′51.7″N 96°24′16.4″W

Sioux City Grain Exchange (SCGX)
- Trading floor, 1963
- Company type: Commodities market
- Predecessor: Sioux City Board of Trade
- Founded: October 14, 1907
- Founder: Fred L. Eaton
- Fate: Exchange absorbed into Terminal Grain Corp (now Tegra Corp); Subsidiary still operating
- Headquarters: Sioux City, Iowa
- Area served: Corn Belt
- Key people: Secretaries: Charles C. Flanley; Freeman Bradford (1924-1938); William H. Marriott (1938-1951)
- Products: Corn, wheat, oat, soybean
- Services: Inspection, grading, weighing; Cereal laboratory; Arbitration; Shipping rates; Terminal & transfer elevators
- Subsidiaries: Sioux City Inspection and Weighing Company

The Sioux City Grain Exchange (SCGX) was a cash commodity market in Sioux City, Iowa that primarily traded corn, wheat, oat, and soybean. It was established in 1907 as the Sioux City Board of Trade, named the "fastest growing grain market in the world" in 1929, and among the largest exchanges in the world by the 1970s; transacting over 100 million bushels annually (valued at $1 billion as of 2018). It served the Corn Belt (primarily Iowa, Nebraska, South Dakota, and Minnesota) and primarily competed against the Chicago Mercantile Exchange, Minneapolis Grain Exchange and Kansas City Board of Trade. SCGX's rise and decline was driven by barge navigation of the Missouri River and mirrored the Sioux City Livestock Exchange (Sioux City Stockyards), the largest in the world during the 1970s. Both were co-founded by Vermont banker Fred L. Eaton.

== History ==
=== Founding and operation ===
The Sioux City Grain Exchange was established on October 14, 1907, as the Sioux City Board of Trade by Fred L. Eaton, Clarence A. Knapp, and Granville B. Healy with the purpose to "foster and promote trade and commerce in Sioux City and to establish and maintain commercial and financial exchanges". It was first headquartered in the Grain Exchange Building (formerly Garretson Hotel) at 507 5th Street, which was destroyed by a fire on May 24, 1914. A second headquarters, also called the Grain Exchange Building (Insurance Exchange today), was built in 1916 at 507 7th Street. Following Roaring Twenties growth, the Sioux City Board of Trade reincorporated as the Sioux City Grain Exchange on June 28, 1922. It relocated to the sixth floor of the Warnock Building (Benson Building today) at 705 Douglas Street in March 1928 and added a state-of-the-art cereal laboratory staffed with chemists to its inspection, grading, weighing, and storage services which operated under the license and supervision of the United States Department of Agriculture. The trading floor operated Monday through Friday, 9:30a to 1:30p central standard time.

=== Rise ===
By the 1920s, SCGX was doubling annually and had emerged as the "fastest growing grain market in the world"; transacting 22 million bushels in 1928 (valued at $336 million in 2018), resulting from its location in the heart of the Corn Belt and self-imposed standards before the Grain Standards Act of 1916 including species admittance and non-mixing. However, its growth was limited by shipping rates. With the trucking industry and Interstate Highway System not yet developed, SCGX was constrained by monopolized railroad rates, primarily by the Great Northern Railway. Exhausting their bargaining power with the Interstate Commerce Commission, SCGX President Charles C. Flanley directed future lobbying efforts to unlocking barge navigation of the Missouri River. His initiative was stalled throughout the 1930s by the Great Depression and Dust Bowl. In 1938, a renewed thirteen-year campaign led by Secretary William Henry Marriott finally opened commercial navigation of the Missouri River and helped establish the Missouri River Basin Project, which included development of the Gavins Point Dam. The alternate transportation succeeded in breaking the railroad's monopoly. By the 1970s, SCGX was among the largest exchanges in the world; transacting over 100 million bushels annually (valued at $1 billion as of 2018).

== Gallery ==
First Grain Exchange HQ, 1910

Trading floor, April 1914

Grain Exchange Fire, May 1914

Third Grain Exchange HQ, 1929

Cereal laboratory, 1963

== See also ==
- Corn Palace
