= Oscar Howe =

American painter

- Mazuha Hokshina
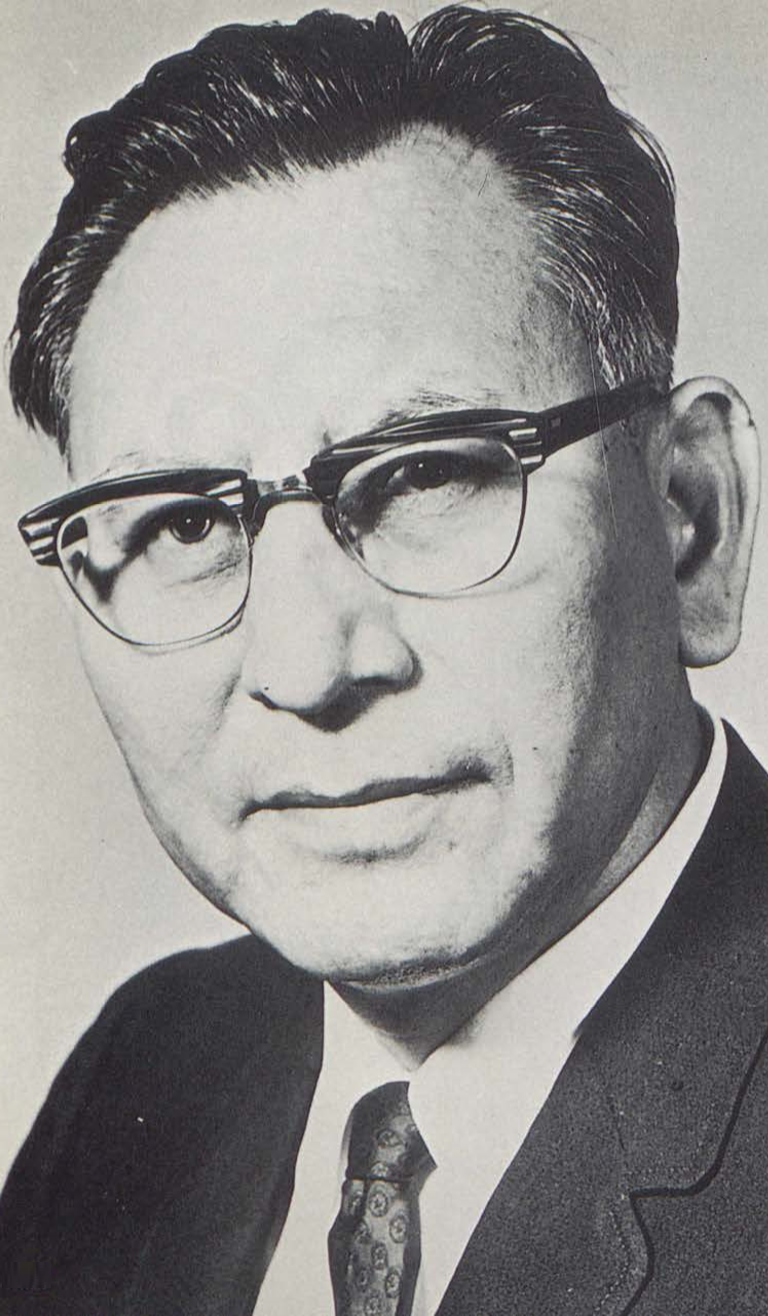
- Born: May 13, 1915; Joe Creek, South Dakota, Crow Creek Sioux Reservation
- Died: October 7, 1983 (aged 68)
- Monuments: Oscar Howe Memorial Association
- Education: Pierre Indian School, Santa Fe Indian School, Fort Sill Indian Art Center, Bacone College
- Alma mater: B.A., Dakota Wesleyan University, 1952, M.F.A., University of Oklahoma in 1954
- Occupations: Artist, painter, art professor
- Employer(s): Works Progress Administration in South Dakota, Pierre High School, Dakota Wesleyan University, the Corn Palace, the University of South Dakota
- Known for: Casein and tempera paintings, murals
- Spouse: Heidi Hampel
- Children: Inge Dawn
- Awards: Artist Laureate of South Dakota; Waite Phillips trophy for outstanding contributions to American Indian art, and many others

Oscar Howe (Dakota: Mazuha Hokshina, lit. 'Trader Boy', May 13, 1915 – October 7, 1983) was a Yanktonai Dakota artist from South Dakota, who became well known for his casein and tempera paintings. He is credited with influencing contemporary Native American art, paving the way for future artists. His art style is marked by bright color, dynamic motion and pristine lines.

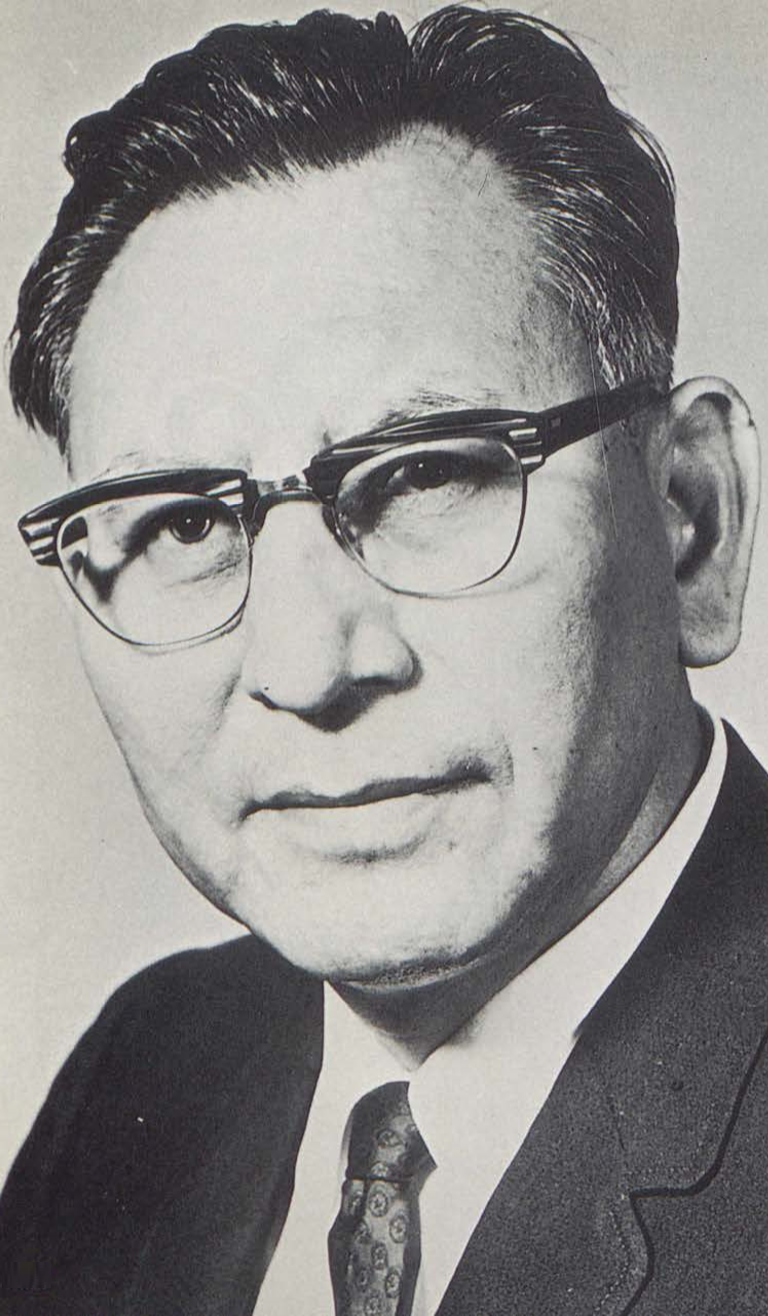
Oscar Howe – Yanktonai Sioux artist (1915-1983)

== Early life and education ==
Oscar Howe was born in 1915 in Joe Creek, South Dakota on the Crow Creek Sioux Reservation. His Dakota name was Mazuha Hokshina, or "Trader Boy." Descended from hereditary chiefs, he belonged to the Yanktonai band of Dakota people. He attended the Pierre Indian School (a boarding school) in South Dakota in 1933.

His artistic talent was recognized when he was young, and Howe studied in Dorothy Dunn’s art program at the Studio of Santa Fe Indian School from 1933 to 1938. In 1940 Howe was sent by the South Dakota Artists Project (a division of the Works Progress Administration in the President Franklin D. Roosevelt administration) to Fort Sill Indian Art Center in Lawton, Oklahoma, to study mural painting techniques with Olle Nordmark. WPA artists were being commissioned to do murals in numerous federal buildings and sometimes local public buildings as well. He attended Bacone College, where his classmates included Terry Saul, and Walter Richard “Dick” West Sr.

After working for several years and serving in World War II, Howe went to college on the GI Bill, earning his B.A. degree at Dakota Wesleyan University in 1952. Having worked as an artist for more than a decade, he also taught as Artist-in-Residence. He received his M.F.A. at the University of Oklahoma in 1954.

Howe met his future wife Heidi Hampel in Germany while serving overseas during World War II. He was discharged in 1945 and returned to the United States. After winning the Grand Purchase Prize in 1947 at the Indian Art Annual, sponsored by Philbrook Art Center, he had enough funds to send for Heidi to come to the United States, and they married. In 1948 they had a daughter, Inge Dawn, their only child.

== Art career ==
Howe's early paintings are similar to other work produced by the Santa Fe Indian School. Later he developed a distinctive style of his own. Howe began with traditional Sioux "straight line" painting, based on hide and later ledger paintings of the 19th century. It was "an artistic form which symbolizes truth or righteousness." He infused it with the Native American art style Tohokmu (spider web). His work has been compared to Cubism, though he rejected the neo-Cubist label in favor of situating his work firmly within Dakota epistemology. Through his art, he wanted to portray the contemporary realities of his tribal culture.

During the 1930s and the Great Depression, Howe was employed by the Works Progress Administration in South Dakota. He painted a set of murals for the municipal auditorium in Mobridge and a mural within the dome of the Carnegie Library, now the Carnegie Resource Center, in Mitchell, South Dakota. Howe worked as an art instructor at Pierre High School in 1939. From 1948 to 1971, he designed panels for the Corn Palace in Mitchell.

Howe became Professor of Art at the University of South Dakota, in Vermillion, South Dakota, in 1957. He taught there until 1983.

Survey texts and articles on Native American modern art often credit Howe with influencing the development of contemporary art in the Indian community. In 1958 he was rejected from a show of Native American art at the Philbrook Museum because his work did not meet the criteria of "traditional" Indian style.

Howe wrote in protest,

"Are we to be held back forever with one phase of Indian painting that is the most common way? Are we to be herded like a bunch of sheep, with no right for individualism, dictated to as the Indian has always been, put on reservations and treated like a child and only the White Man know what is best for him... but one could easily turn to become a social protest painter. I only hope the Art World will not be one more contributor to holding us in chains."

His protest led to the acceptance of abstraction within the community.

Over his 41-year career, Oscar Howe won numerous awards, including grand and first prizes. His works were displayed all over the world, including Paris, France and London, England, with more than 50 solo shows.

== Honors ==
In 1960, he was named Artist Laureate of South Dakota.

He was awarded the Waite Phillips trophy for outstanding contributions to American Indian art from the Philbrook Art Center, Tulsa, Oklahoma, in 1966. In 1970, he received the Golden Bear Award from the University of Oklahoma, Norman.

In 1973, he was the first recipient of the South Dakota Governor's Award for Creative Achievement.

In 1971, he was appointed Lecturer to the Near East and South Asia by the United States Department of State. He presented programs during his tour in nine countries.

Two exhibition spaces are dedicated to showing his work: the Oscar Howe Art Gallery at the Dakota Discovery Museum in Mitchell, and the Oscar Howe Gallery at the University of South Dakota in Vermillion.

From April 17, 2007, to February 17, 2008, an exhibit of Oscar Howe's work was on display at the South Dakota Art Museum in Brookings. Most of these works were done in casein paint. There were also works in graphite on paper and sculpture of stone and bronze on display.

Oscar Howe Elementary School in Sioux Falls, South Dakota, is named after him.

A yearly lecture is held in his honor at the University of South Dakota.

The Oscar Howe Memorial Association at the University of South Dakota is named after him and is dedicated to promoting research and educational projects in Native American art. The Oscar Howe Memorial Association also sponsors the USD Summer Art Institute, the Oscar Howe Archive Project, the Oscar Howe Memorial Lecture and the Robert Penn Northern Plains Contemporary Indian Art Collection.

From March 11 to September 11, 2022, an exhibition of Oscar Howe's work was on display at the George Gustav Heye Center, the New York branch of the Smithsonian Institution National Museum of the American Indian.

== Gallery ==
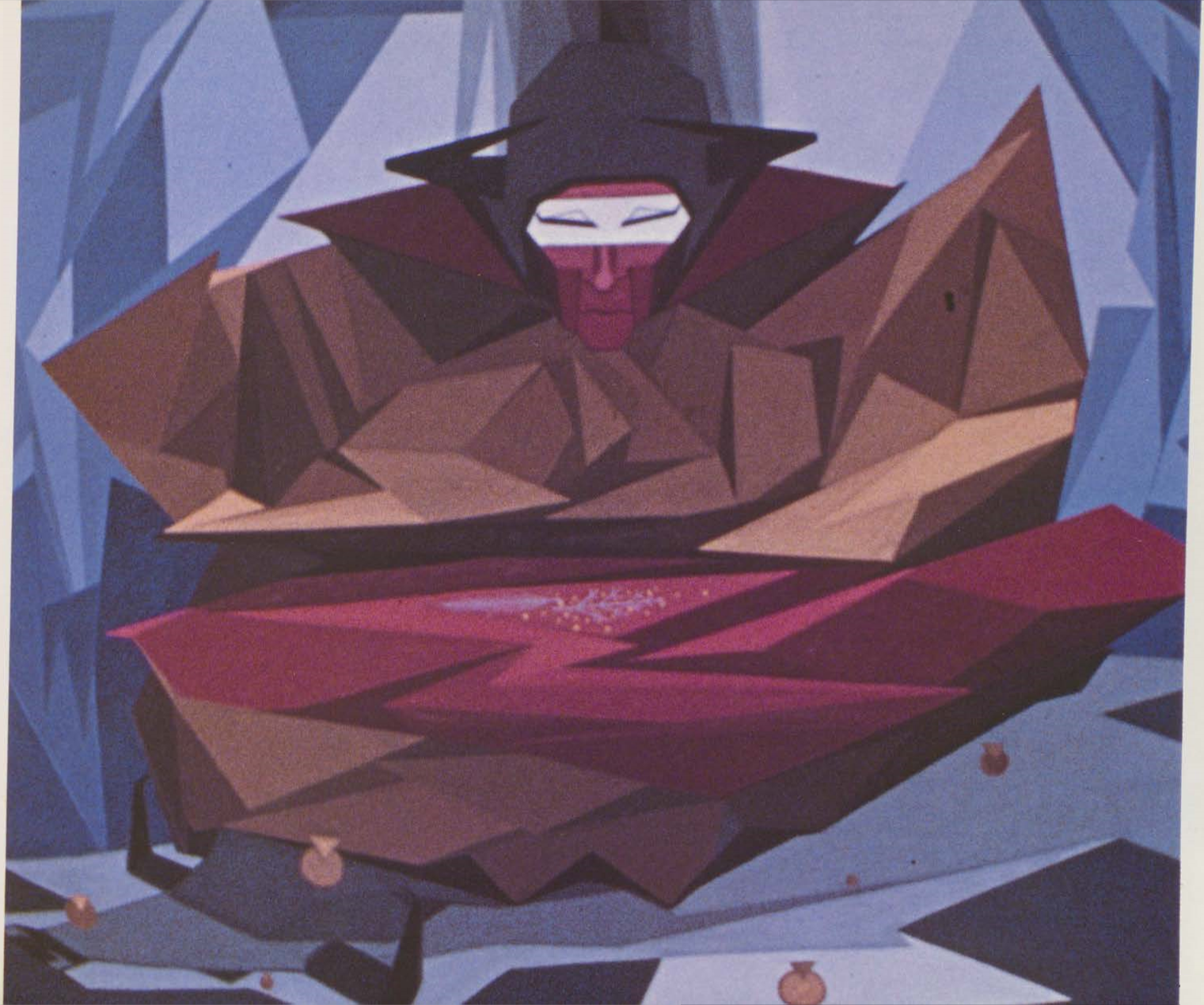
Oscar Howe – Medicine Man – painted 1962
