= James Montgomery Rice =

American soldier, lawyer

Representative James Montgomery Rice Juris Doctor
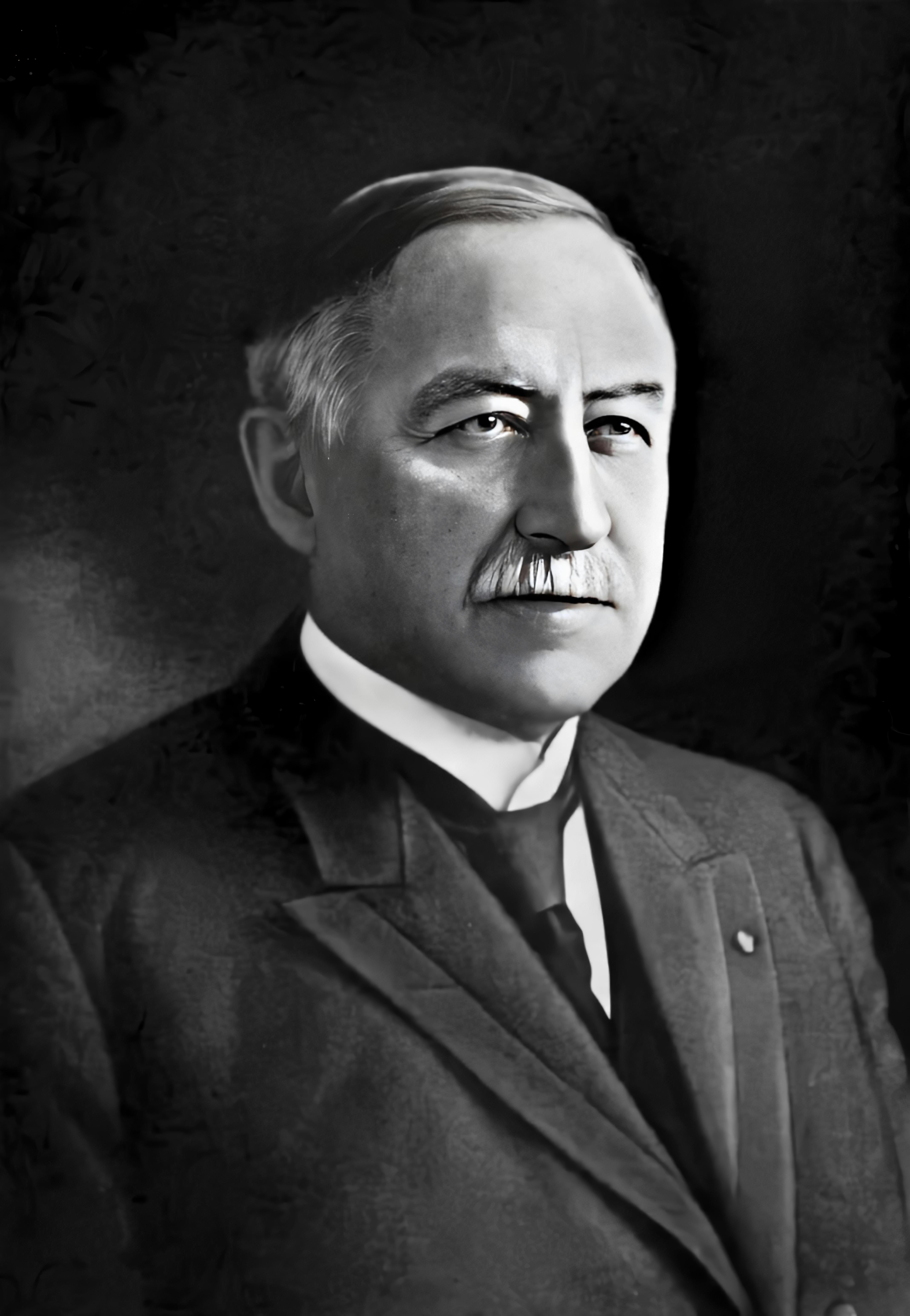

Member of the Illinois House of Representatives
- In office January 4, 1871 – March 14, 1872
- Constituency: Peoria County

Member of the Presbyterian General Assembly
- In office 1899–1900

Personal details
- Born: March 8, 1842 Monmouth, Illinois
- Died: April 11, 1912 (aged 70) Peoria, Illinois
- Party: Republican
- Spouse: Eliza Rice (m. 1871)
- Children: 6
- Relatives: William Montgomery (2nd great-grandfather); Montgomery Case (nephew); C. Montgomery Marriott (grand-nephew)
- Education: University of Michigan (BA)
- Alma mater: Michigan Law (JD); Monmouth College (B.A.)

Military service
- Branch/service: United States Army
- Rank: Colonel

James Montgomery Rice (March 8, 1842 – April 11, 1912) was an American soldier (Colonel), lawyer, and member of the Illinois House of Representatives who contributed to the establishment of the United States National Guard.

== Early life ==
Rice was born in Monmouth, Illinois, to George and Caroline (née Montgomery) Rice. He was named after his second great-grandfather, William Montgomery, whose vaunted military and political service was a major influence on his life. He enrolled in Monmouth College in 1860.

== American Civil War ==
Following the First Battle of Bull Run, on August 20, 1861, Rice left Monmouth College to enlist in the 10th Illinois Infantry Regiment. After three years of continuous service, which covered 1,000 marched miles and 13 battles, he was discharged on September 18, 1864.

== Juris Doctor ==
Rice completed a bachelor's degree at the University of Michigan followed by a Juris Doctor at Michigan Law School. Following graduation, he went into practice with David McCulloch and was admitted to the Supreme Court of Illinois in 1867, followed by the Supreme Court of the United States in 1890. He practiced law for 31 years.

== United States National Guard ==
James Montgomery Rice Colonel
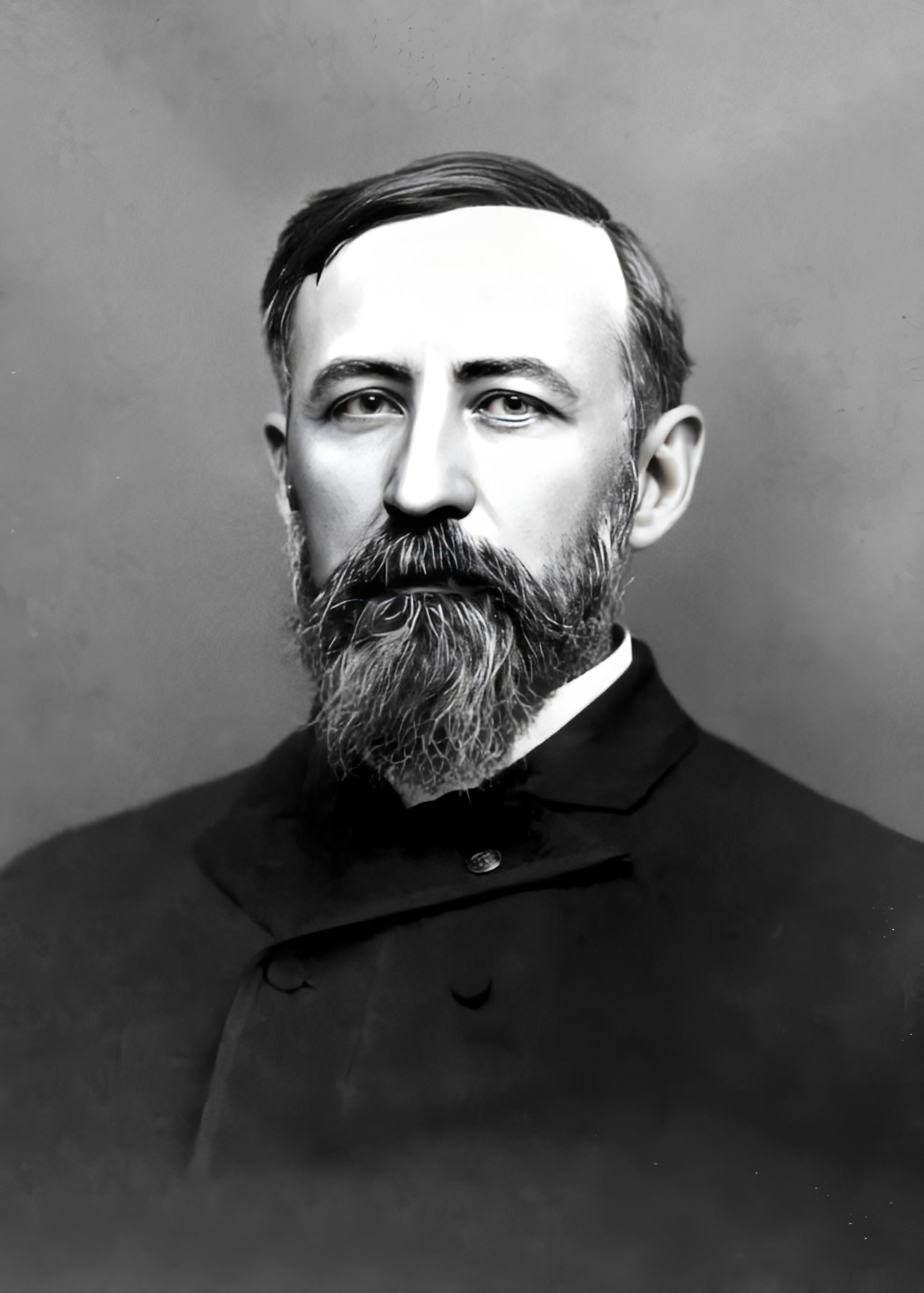
- 1890
- Military career
- Branch: 10th Infantry, Union Army; National Blues, Illinois National Guard
- Service years: 1861–1864; 1875–1896
- Rank: Colonel
- Commands: Second Brigade
- Conflicts: 1877 St. Louis Strike American Civil War: Battle of Island Ten; Siege of Corinth; Battle of Chickamauga; Wheeler's Raid; Battle of Missionary Ridge; Atlanta campaign: Battle of Rocky Face Ridge; Battle of Resaca; Battle of Dallas; Battle of Marietta; Battle of Kennesaw Mountain; Battle of Peachtree Creek; Battle of Utoy Creek; Battle of Jonesborough

In 1875, Rice re-enlisted in the National Blues of the Illinois Militia. Recalling his experience in the American Civil War, Rice was concerned with the organizational structure, lack of standardization in leader qualifications and professional development, low levels of individual and unit training and readiness, and inadequate uniforms and equipment. He began advocating for federal involvement and became the first chairman of the Committee on Legislation of the National Guard Association of Illinois in 1883. He authored dozens of articles over the ensuing years including most notably:

- 1888, Military Education and the Volunteer Militia
- 1894, The National Guard—What It is and Its Use
- 1896, The Defense of our Frontier
- 1896, The Present Congress and the National Guard
  - Notable excerpt: “The National Guard, if rightly fostered and improved, will be a very efficient and economical force to be used for almost any purpose and at any place where a force may be needed by either the state or the nation.”
- 1901, Field Service Instruction and the National Guard Officer
- 1904, The New National Guard

His articles were circulated nationwide and caught the attention of the National Guard Association of the United States. He joined the executive staff in 1890 alongside Charles Dick who would become president in 1902 and sponsor the Militia Act of 1903, officially establishing the United States National Guard.

In 1892, Rice authored the Range Manual and Score Record and Small Arms Practice for National Guard, which are adopted as doctrine nationwide.

== Other civic service ==
During the golden age of fraternalism, Rice assisted in organizing the Grand Army of the Republic Bryner Post #67 in Peoria, Illinois. In 1879 he was nominated the first adjutant and served on the national staff from 1894 to 1896. In 1896 his mother, Caroline, established the Peoria chapter Daughters of the American Revolution, honoring her great-grandfather William Montgomery.

In 1897, Rice was endorsed by the Illinois Republican Party and National Guard Association of the United States for United States Assistant Secretary of War, however George de Rue Meiklejohn won the nomination.

In 1901, Rice authored the "Peoria Overture Plan" which profoundly effected corruption and reorganization of the Presbyterian Church.
