= William Montgomery (Pennsylvania soldier) =

American general and politician

Major General William Montgomery Honorable
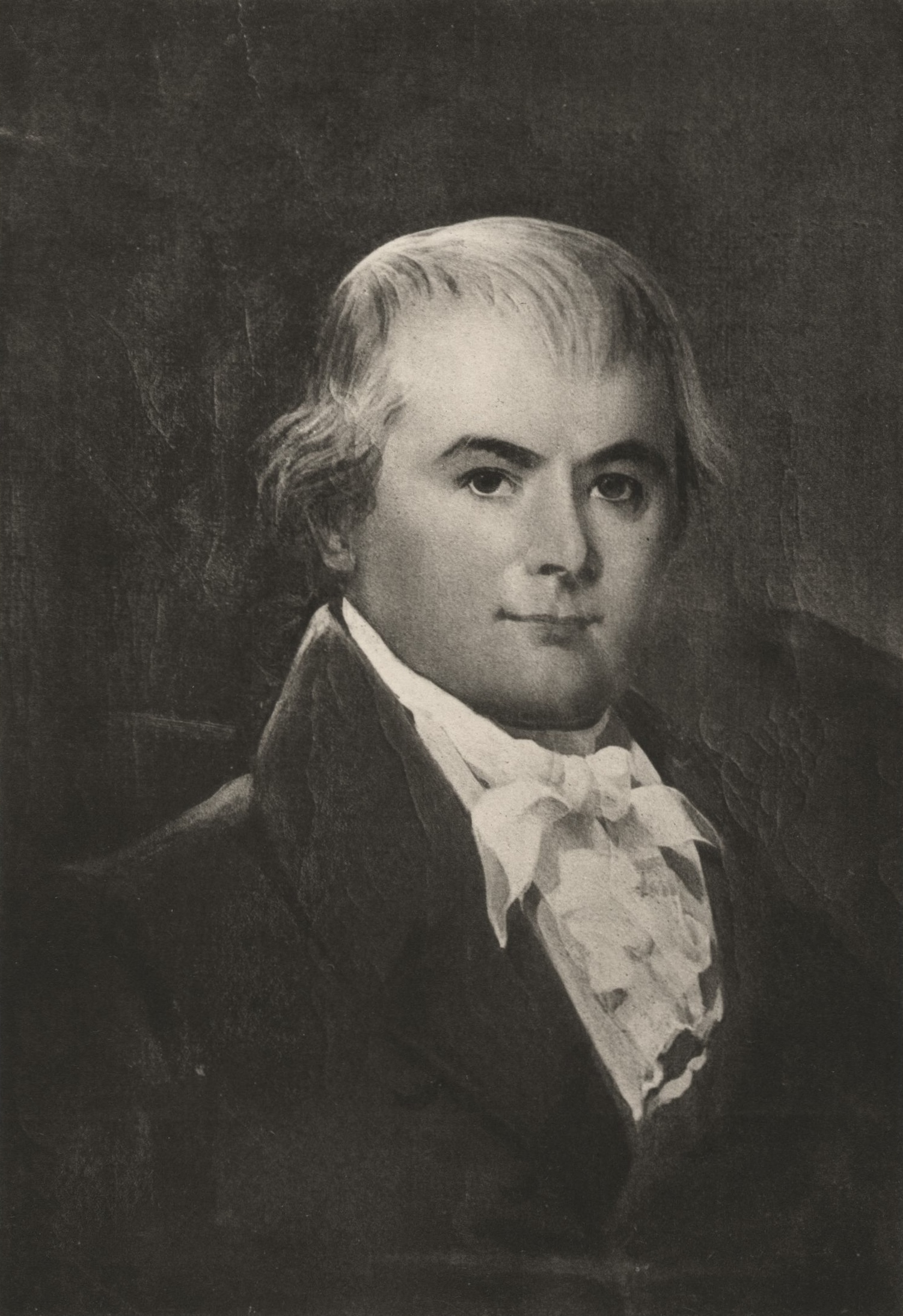
- Engraving, c. 1798

Member of the U.S. House of Representatives from Pennsylvania's 6th and at-large congressional district
- In office March 4, 1793 – March 3, 1795
- Preceded by: Redistricted
- Succeeded by: Samuel Maclay

Member of the Pennsylvania Senate
- In office February 1791 – January 20, 1794
- Preceded by: Office established
- Succeeded by: William Hepburn
- Constituency: Huntingdon, Luzerne, Northumberland

Chair of the Appropriations Committee
- In office 1791–1793

Chief Judge, Court of Common Pleas and Quarter Sessions
- In office May 4, 1785 – November 22, 1790
- Preceded by: Unknown
- Succeeded by: Unknown
- Constituency: Northumberland, Luzerne

Delegate to the Continental Congress from Pennsylvania
- In office 1785–resigned
- Preceded by: Unknown
- Succeeded by: Charles Pettit
- Constituency: Confederation Congress

Censor on the Council of Censors
- In office 1783–1790
- Preceded by: Office established
- Succeeded by: Office abolished
- Constituency: Northumberland County

Member of the Pennsylvania Assembly
- In office February 1780 – November 1783
- Preceded by: James McKnight
- Succeeded by: James McClenaghan
- Constituency: Northumberland County

Chair of the Armed Services Committee
- In office 1780–1783

Delegate to the Pennsylvania Provincial Convention
- In office July 15, 1776 – resigned
- Succeeded by: LTC Thomas Strawbridge
- Constituency: Chester County

Delegate to the Pennsylvania Provincial Conference
- In office June 18, 1776 – June 25, 1776
- Constituency: Chester County

Chair of Military Personnel Committee
- In office June 18, 1776 – June 25, 1776

Delegate to the Convention for the Province of Pennsylvania
- In office January 23, 1775 – January 28, 1775
- Constituency: Chester County

Delegate to the Committee of Inspection
- In office December 20, 1774 – 1775
- Constituency: Chester County

Personal details
- Born: August 3, 1736 Mill Creek, Delaware Colony, British America
- Died: May 1, 1816 (aged 79) Danville, Pennsylvania, U.S.
- Party: Patriot; Constitutionalist; Democratic-Republican; Anti-Federalist; Anti-Administration
- Spouse(s): Margaret Nevin (m. 1756; died 1770) Isabella Evans (m. 1772); Hannah Boyd (m. 1793)
- Children: 10, including Daniel
- Relatives: Montgomery Clan; Richard Montgomery; Montgomery Case; J. Montgomery Rice; C. Montgomery Marriott
- Education: Faggs Classical School
- Alma mater: William & Mary (dropout)
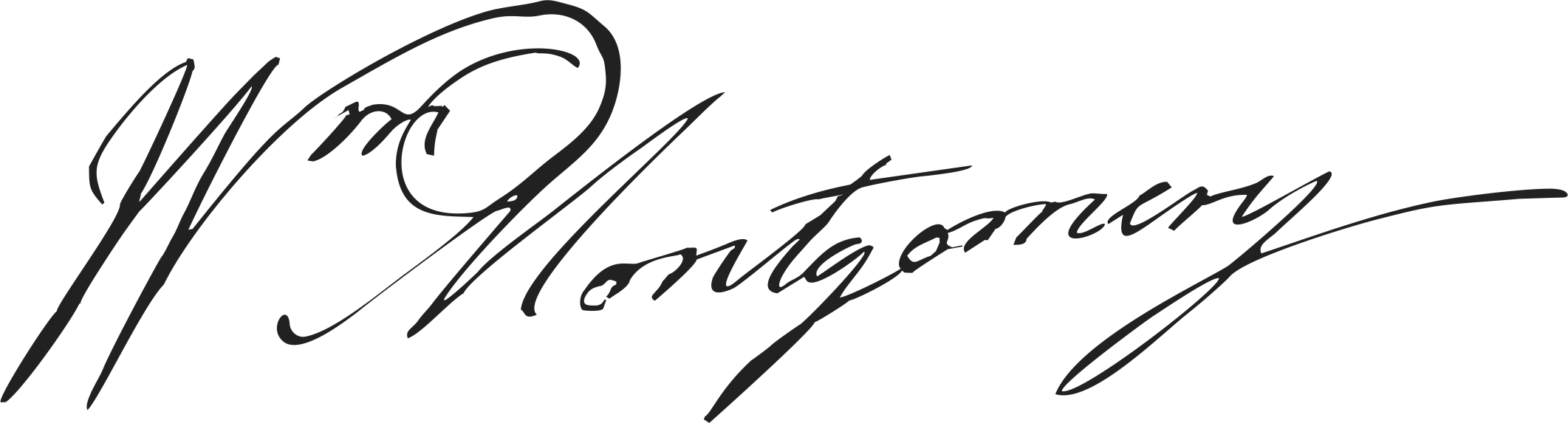
- Signature
- Website: United States Congress

Military service
- Allegiance: Great Britain; United Colonies; United States
- Branch/service: Associators; Continental Army; Pennsylvania Militia
- Years of service: 1757-75 (Associators); 1776-77 (Continental Army); 1793-1807 (Pennsylvania Militia)
- Rank: Colonel (Associators); Colonel (Continental Army); Major General (Pennsylvania Militia)
- Commands: 4th Elk Battalion, Associators; 1st PA Regiment Flying Camp, Continental Army; 7th Division, Pennsylvania Militia; 9th Division, Pennsylvania Militia
- Battles/wars: American Revolutionary War New York and New Jersey Campaign: Battle of Long Island; Battle of Fort Washington; Battle of Fort Lee; Ten Crucial Days

William Montgomery (August 3, 1736 – May 1, 1816) was a colonial-American patriot, pioneer, soldier, public servant, and abolitionist.

As a revolutionary patriot, he helped the Province of Pennsylvania declare independence from the British Empire, establish the Commonwealth of Pennsylvania, and save the American Revolution during the Ten Crucial Days. As a soldier, he served a total of 34 years, including 14 years as major general and division commander. As a public servant, he was elected or appointed to 16 different offices, including the Continental Congress, Pennsylvania Congress, and United States Congress, and co-authorized the creation of the United States Navy's first six frigates. As an abolitionist, he helped pass: a resolution to prohibit the future import of slaves into the Province of Pennsylvania in 1775, An Act for the Gradual Abolition of Slavery (the first law adopted by a democracy to end slavery in world history) in 1780, and the Slave Trade Act in 1794. He was one of seven congressmen who voted against the Fugitive Slave Act in 1793. As a pioneer he founded "Montgomery's Landing", later named Danville, Pennsylvania after his son, Daniel Montgomery.

== Early life ==
William Montgomery descends from Roger de Montgomery of Normandy via Arnulf de Montgomery through the Montgomery Clan. His grandparents, Major John (aka "Boyne Water") and Margaret (née Dunbar) Montgomery, immigrated from County Armagh, Ireland to the Delaware Colony in 1722. They acquired extensive lands in Mill Creek Hundred of the Twelve-Mile Circle. John was a founding elder in the White Clay Creek Presbyterian Church.

William's parents, Alexander and Mary (née McCullough) Montgomery, followed them to Mill Creek Hundred in 1730 and inherited a plantation and gristmill of 400 acres upon John's death. William Montgomery was born in Mill Creek Hundred on August 3, 1736, the third of six children, and spent his childhood working the plantation and gristmill. In 1743, Alexander and his partner, William Nevin (William's future father-in-law), purchased 650 acres adjacent to Faggs Manor in Londonderry Township, Chester County, Province of Pennsylvania. In 1747, at age 11, William and his 5 minor siblings were orphaned when their parents died. Their cause of death is unknown. Their guardians, Evan Rice and Robert Kirkwood, were from the White Clay Creek Presbyterian Church, but they were raised by their aunt and uncles (Thomas and Robert) who had also settled in Delaware and Pennsylvania. In his adolescence, William was educated in surveying, milling, trade, and management. He was taught by Samuel Blair and mentored by Dr. David Stewart. He dropped out of the College of William & Mary.

In 1756, William married Margaret Nevin and settled on the 822 acres he inherited (and acquired) in Londonderry Township. Over the next 14 years, they had six children, including Daniel Montgomery, and made it the most prosperous farm in Chester County. It primarily produced wheat. Margaret died in 1770 and William married Isabella Evans in 1772. They welcomed their first of four children in April 1773. In November 1773 he began acquiring land in Northumberland County from J. Cummings. On November 26, 1774 he acquired 180 acres along Mahoning Creek and Susquehanna River known as "Karkaase" from J. Simpson. Originally referred to as "Montgomery's Landing", it would become Danville, Pennsylvania after his son, Daniel Montgomery.

Following the Pennsylvania Militia Act of 1755, which compelled "all males between 17 and 45 years of age, having a freehold worth 150 pounds a year, to arm himself and appear for training on the first Monday of March, June, August, and November" for protection in the French and Indian War, William joined the Associators in 1757 and continued to serve for the next 17 years.

== Patriot ==
=== Background ===
By 1774, tensions over imperial rule had been escalating in the Thirteen Colonies for 14 years. It had been nine years since the Sons of Liberty formed, seven years since the Townshend Acts, four years since Golden Hill and the Boston Massacre, two years since Samuel Adams' Committee of Correspondence, one year since the Boston Tea Party, and 55 days since the First Continental Congress. Montgomery is a father of six children, a prominent 38-year-old farmer in Londonderry Township [Province of Pennsylvania], and had been serving in the Associators (militia) for 17 years. He is also a political activist whose correspondence with John Dickinson influenced Letters from a Farmer in Pennsylvania, a precursor to Thomas Paine's Common Sense.

William's oldest brother, Captain John Montgomery, was also a revolutionary patriot deeply involved in the grassroots effort for independence in the Province of North Carolina, which culminated in the War of the Regulation. He commanded a company in the Battle of Alamance and was wounded by the second canon volley. He also commanded a company at the Battle of Guilford Court House and was again wounded, then imprisoned. He was sentenced for execution but escaped.

William's distant cousin was Richard Montgomery, for whom he wrote a poem about his revolutionary service.

=== Political service ===
On December 20, 1774, Montgomery is nominated to the Chester County Committee of Inspection to enforce the trade boycott established by the First Continental Congress. The following month, he is nominated as a Chester County delegate to the Convention for the Province of Pennsylvania (January 23–28, 1775) where they pass 27 resolutions to "restore harmony with Great Britain" while logistically preparing for war. Eighty-six days later, the "shot heard round the world" ignites the American Revolutionary War and Siege of Boston. On June 30, 1775 the Pennsylvania Committee of Safety was established, essentially displacing the governing Provincial Assembly until the Pennsylvania Constitution of 1776, and William was re-commissioned a colonel in command of the 4th [Elk] Battalion, comprising 450 infantry in eight companies. In February 1776, the Chester County Committee of Inspection tasked Montgomery, along with two others, with safeguarding the county's gunpowder magazine.

On June 18, 1776, Montgomery is nominated as a Chester County delegate to the Pennsylvania Provincial Conference at Carpenters' Hall. Their proceedings ("Provincial Conference of Committees of the Province of Pennsylvania") officially declare the Province of Pennsylvania's independence from the British Empire, establish the Commonwealth of Pennsylvania, mobilize the Pennsylvania militia for the American Revolutionary War, and set up the machinery for the Pennsylvania Provincial Convention (July 15 – September 28, 1776) which frames the Pennsylvania Constitution of 1776. As the last holdout of the Thirteen Colonies, they also enable the United States Declaration of Independence to proceed nine days later, which ensures Montgomery's execution if caught by the British.

William was nominated as a Chester County delegate to the Pennsylvania Provincial Convention for establishing the Commonwealth constitution, but his battalion was deployed to New Jersey and he was unable to attend. His daughter-in-law's father, Thomas Strawbridge, went in his place.

=== Military service ===
After defeating the British Army in the Boston, General Washington anticipated General Howe would next seek control of New York City and relocated the Continental Army to fortify the area. With an indefensible number of potential invasion sites around New York Harbor and depleted ranks, Washington divided Continental forces between Manhattan and Brooklyn. On June 3, 1776, the Continental Congress granted Washington's request to stand up a Flying Camp of militia-based reserves. Montgomery's battalion was re-designated the 1st [Pennsylvania] Regiment and mobilized for the fortification of New Jersey. They arrived at Perth Amboy in mid-July, establishing a command post at the Proprietary House, and conducted rotating patrols along the 35-mile strait to Fort Lee. Within days, they were horrified by the arrival of the British Navy off the coast of Staten Island—340 transport ships carrying 32,000 infantry, 35 frigates, and 25 ships of the line bearing 64 cannons each with a range of 2 miles. Five of the latter alone had more collective firepower than the entire Continental Army. Each cost the equivalent of a modern aircraft carrier. It was the largest, most advanced, and most powerful amphibious invasion in world history until Operation Neptune 168 years later.

While repulsing British reconnaissance efforts into New Jersey, the 1st Regiment overheard the defeat of the Continental Army in the Battle of Long Island. After peace talks failed, Montgomery ordered four companies to Fort Lee and four companies to Fort Washington to buffer General Howe's landing at Kip's Bay Manhattan. When Fort Lee and Fort Washington are defeated (along with Montgomery's four companies who are taken prisoner and sent to prison "ships of hell"), Montgomery and his remaining companies, along with General Washington and the remaining Continental Army, retreated to Pennsylvania as they were pursued by General Cornwallis.

By December 1, 1776, Montgomery's regiment is stationed in Philadelphia to stifle Loyalist uprising. He is joined by his son, William Jr., who enlisted upon his 14th birthday, and is serving in Captain James McDowell's company as drummer. General Washington has encamped 30 miles northeast in Taylorsville. Ninety percent of Continental forces have been killed, captured, or deserted—believing the American Revolution is now a lost cause. With their term of enlistment now expired, most of the Flying Camp reserves have returned home. Washington's supplies are also depleted and General Cornwallis is bearing down on his position with 8,000 British and 2,000 Hessian infantry, outnumbering him 3 to 1. The revolution is hanging-on by a single fiber of the last thread. On December 18, Washington writes to his brother: "I think the game is pretty near up...You can form no idea of the perplexity of my situation. No man, I believe, ever had a greater choice of difficulties and less means to extricate himself from them. However under a full persuasion of the justice of our Cause I cannot but think the prospect will brighten, although for a wise purpose it is, at present hid under a cloud." On December 19, Thomas Paine echoes into eternity: "These are the times that try men's souls".

On the night of December 25–26, 1776—in the middle of a snowstorm—General Washington gathers the last of his men and launches operation "Victory or Death" across the Delaware River. Following their subsequent victory at the Battle of Trenton, Montgomery receives General Cadwalader's dispatch for militia reinforcements. Along with 1,800 militia, the 1st Regiment arrives in Crosswicks, New Jersey on January 1, then marches to Trenton where General Washington's army is now engaged with General Cornwallis at the Battle of Assunpink Creek. Rather than retreating back to safety (with his element of surprise now gone and two victories under his belt), Washington attacks Cornwallis' headquarters in the Battle of Princeton—defeating him and establishing his position to wage the Forage War for the next 3 months. Montgomery's regiment, among others, provided the vital diversion, which deceived Cornwallis that Washington's forces were still encamped, and simultaneously removed their supplies to Burlington, New Jersey.

== Pioneer ==
In November 1773, William began acquiring land in Northumberland County from J. Cummings. On November 26, 1774 he acquired 180 acres along Mahoning Creek and Susquehanna River known as "Karkaase" from J. Simpson. Following his service in the New York and New Jersey Campaign, William re-settled his family from Chester County to Northumberland. Originally referred to as "Montgomery's Landing", it would become known as Danville after his son, Daniel Montgomery. After developing his farm, William developed the first gristmill, sawmill, and trading post. In 1778, his family fled during the Big Runaway to Fort Augusta and returned following the Battle of Wyoming. In 1792, William constructed the General William Montgomery House. In the same year Daniel plotted the area between Mill Street and Church Street, the historic core of the town.

== Soldier ==
=== Background ===
Military service defined William's life and the Montgomerys he descends from. His family line has been traced to Roger de Montgomery through his fifth son Arnulf de Montgomery. Following William the Conqueror's invasion of England, their service continued through the Montgomery Clan and Lands of Lainshaw. William's great-grandfather, Major John Montgomery, and two of his sons were killed at the Battle of Boyne. His third son (William's grandfather), Captain John Montgomery, was badly wounded but survived. He was promoted to major and given the nickname "Boyne Water Major" for heroism. William's oldest brother, Captain John Montgomery, was also a revolutionary patriot deeply involved in the grassroots effort for independence in the Province of North Carolina, which culminated in the War of the Regulation. He commanded a company in the Battle of Alamance and was wounded by the second canon volley. He also commanded a company at the Battle of Guilford Court House and was again wounded, then imprisoned. He was sentenced for execution but escaped. William's cousin was Richard Montgomery, for whom he wrote a poem.

=== Service ===
In addition to his political service, Montgomery served in the military for 34 years.

- (1757–1774) Following the Pennsylvania Militia Act of 1755, which compelled "all males between 17 and 45 years of age, having a freehold worth 150 pounds a year, to arm himself and appear for training on the first Monday of March, June, August, and November" for protection in the French and Indian War, William joined the Associators in 1757 and continued to serve for the next 17 years, achieving the rank of colonel.
- (1776–1777) See William's patriot service above.
- (1793–1807) On April 17, 1793 Governor Thomas Mifflin commissioned Montgomery a major general in command of the 7th Division, Pennsylvania Militia for a seven year term. It encompassed the regiments of Northampton, Northumberland, and Luzerne counties. In 1800, his commission was renewed for another seven year term in command of the 9th Division.

=== Posterity ===
The tradition of Montgomery's serving and fighting has continued for generations, including three of William's sons. William Montgomery Jr., who enlisted upon his 14th birthday and served as a company drummer in his father's regiment during the New York and New Jersey Campaign, achieved the rank of major in the War of 1812. John Montgomery served under William's command in the 7th Division and achieved the rank of colonel. On July 27, 1809, Daniel Montgomery was commissioned a major general and transferred command of the 9th Division. William's great-great-grandson, James Montgomery Rice, fought extensively in the American Civil War, helped establish the United States National Guard, and honored William's service through Sons of the American Revolution. William's 4th great-grandson, Charles Montgomery Marriott, lost both of his hands, and was awarded the Silver Star, from a stielhandgranate while saving his platoon during the Rhineland Offensive of World War II.

== Public servant ==
In addition to his military service, which began at age 21, Montgomery was in continuous public service from age 38 to 72. In total, he was elected, appointed, or nominated to 16 different county, state, and federal offices.

- (1774–1776) Elected Assessor Chester County
- (1774) Nominated Delegate (Patriot), Chester County, Committee of Inspection
  - Enforced the trade boycott established by the First Continental Congress
- (1775) Nominated Delegate (Patriot), Chester County, Convention for the Province of Pennsylvania
  - Passed 27 resolutions to "restore harmony with Great Britain" while logistically preparing for war and voted in favor of a resolution for the Provincial Assembly to "prohibit the future import of slaves into the Province of Pennsylvania."
- (1776) Nominated Delegate (Patriot), Chester County, Pennsylvania Provincial Conference
  - Proceedings ("Provincial Conference of Committees of the Province of Pennsylvania") officially declare the Province of Pennsylvania's independence from the British Empire, establish the Commonwealth of Pennsylvania, mobilize the Pennsylvania militia for the American Revolutionary War, and set up the machinery for the Pennsylvania Provincial Convention (July 15 – September 28, 1776) which frames the Pennsylvania Constitution of 1776. As the last holdout of the Thirteen Colonies, they also enable the United States Declaration of Independence to proceed nine days later, which ensures Montgomery's execution if caught by the British.
  - Chair of Military Personnel Committee – "devised ways and means for raising 4500 men and to enquire into all matters to fit them for taking the field."
- (1776) Nominated Delegate (Patriot), Chester County, Pennsylvania Provincial Convention
  - His flying camp regiment was deployed by George Washington to reinforce New Jersey before he was able to attend. His daughter-in-law's father, Lieutenant Colonel Thomas Strawbridge, went in his place.
- (1780–1783) Elected Member (Constitutionalist), Northumberland County, Pennsylvania General Assembly (then unicameral).
  - Served in the Fourth, Fifth, Sixth, and Seventh legislative sessions.
  - Voted in favor of An Act for the Gradual Abolition of Slavery, the first law adopted by a democracy to end slavery in world history.
  - Chair of the Armed Services Committee – "devised ways and means for the support of the [Continental] army and keeping the ranks full" and "adjust a plan proposed for the greater case of the militia service"
- (1783–1807) Appointed Deputy Surveyor, Northumberland County
  - Re-appointed three times, Montgomery's longest-held office. Over his 24-year tenure, it is estimated he surveyed 1,600 tracts comprising ~500,000 acres.
- (1783) Appointed Trustee, Northumberland County, Dickinson College
- (1783–1790) Elected Censor (Constitutionalist), Northumberland County, Council of Censors – inspired by Ancient Rome, the first, and only, in American history.
  - Fought to preserve the Constitution of 1776. Endured until the Constitution of 1790 which established the bicameral legislature, and abolished the Council of Censors.
- (1785) Nominated Delegate, Northumberland County, Congress of the Confederation
  - Resigned nomination to accept appointment as President Judge.
- (1785–1790) Appointed President Judge, Court of Common Pleas, Quarter Sessions, and Orphans' Court.
  - Presided over Pennamite–Yankee War claims from 1787 to 1790
- (1791–1804) Associate Judge, Northumberland County
- (1791–1805) Commissioner, Pennsylvania Canal
- (1791–1794) Elected Senator (Democratic-Republican), Huntingdon, Luzerne, and Northumberland Counties, Pennsylvania General Assembly
  - Served in the Fifteenth, Sixteenth, Seventeenth, and Eighteenth legislative sessions.
  - Chair of the Appropriations Committee
- (1791–1793) Elected Member (Anti-Federalist), Pennsylvania's 6th District, U.S. House of Representatives
  - Served in the 2nd United States Congress
  - Voted in favor of the Militia Acts of 1792
  - One of seven Representatives who voted against the Fugitive Slave Act.
  - He was previously a candidate for this seat in 1791, finishing last of five candidates, and a candidate in 1788 for the at-large district.
- (1793–1795) Elected Member (Anti-Administration), Pennsylvania's at-large district, U.S. House of Representatives
  - Served in the 3rd United States Congress
  - Voted in favor of the Slave Trade Act of 1794
  - Voted in favor of the Naval Act of 1794
- (1804) Elected Elector, Pennsylvania, 1804 United States presidential election
- (1808) Elected Elector, Pennsylvania, 1808 United States presidential election

== Abolitionist ==
- (1756–1816) Extensively used indentured servants in lieu of slave labor on his farms, plantations, and businesses.
- (1775) As a delegate a Chester County delegate to the Convention for the Province of Pennsylvania, voted in favor of a resolution for the Provincial Assembly to "prohibit the future import of slaves into the Province of Pennsylvania."
- (1780) As a Pennsylvania Congressman, voted in favor of An Act for the Gradual Abolition of Slavery, the first law adopted by a democracy to end slavery in world history.
- (1793) As a United States Congressman, Montgomery was one of seven Representatives who voted against the Fugitive Slave Act.
- (1794) As a United States Congressman, voted in favor of the Slave Trade Act.

== Legacy ==
- According to historian James E. Gibson, "The Delegates from the Pennsylvania counties [to the Pennsylvania Provincial Conference] deserve equal honors with those of the signers of the Declaration of Independence, for in their own strong declaration of independence they took the same risks of English punishment as did the members of the Continental Congress."
- The Prison Ship Martyrs' Monument honors, among others, Montgomery's soldiers who were captured at Fort Washington.
- Ten Crucial Days is considered one of the most significant military offensives in history. According to George Otto Trevelyan: "It may be doubted whether so small a number of men ever employed so short a space of time with greater and more lasting effects upon the history of the world." Frederick the Great called them "the most brilliant in the world's history." President Coolidge called them "a military exploit of unparalleled brilliancy."
- Turn: Washington's Spies, season 1, episode 5 "Epiphany" – depicts Montgomery's diversion preceding the Battle of Princeton
- His homestead in Danville, the General William Montgomery House, was listed on the National Register of Historic Places in 1979 and is now a museum operated by the Montour County Historical Society.
- 151 years after William's regiment retreated across the Hudson River from Fort Washington to Fort Lee, his 3rd great-grandson, Montgomery Case, erected the George Washington Bridge in the same location. It was the longest main span bridge in the world upon completion, and is the busiest motor vehicle bridge in the world; transiting over one billion vehicles from 2008 to 2018.

U.S. House of Representatives
Preceded by None	Member of the U.S. House of Representatives from Pennsylvania's at-large congressional district 1793-1795	Succeeded by None
