= Daniel Montgomery Jr. =

American politician

Major General Daniel Montgomery Jr.

Member of the U.S. House of Representatives from Pennsylvania's 5th district
- In office March 4, 1807 – March 3, 1809
- Preceded by: Seat established
- Succeeded by: George Smith
- Constituency: Northumberland County

Member of the Pennsylvania Senate
- In office 1804–1806
- Preceded by: George Jacob Follmer
- Succeeded by: James Laird
- Constituency: Northumberland County

Member of the Pennsylvania House
- In office 1802–1803
- Preceded by: Samuel Dale
- Succeeded by: Leonard Rupert
- Constituency: Northumberland County

Personal details
- Born: October 30, 1765 Londonderry Township, Province of Pennsylvania, British America
- Died: December 30, 1831 (aged 66) Danville, Pennsylvania, U.S.
- Party: Democratic-Republican
- Spouse: Christina Strawbridge (m. 1791)
- Relations: Montgomery Clan
- Children: 7
- Parent: William Montgomery (father) Margaret Nevin (mother)
- Website: United States Congress

Military service
- Allegiance: Pennsylvania, America
- Branch/service: Pennsylvania Militia
- Years of service: ? — 1819
- Rank: Major General
- Commands: 81st Regiment; 8th Division; 9th Division

Daniel Montgomery Jr. (October 30, 1765 – December 30, 1831) was an American pioneer, soldier, and public servant.

== Biography ==
Daniel Montgomery Jr. was the third son of William Montgomery, and was fifteen years old when his father settled his lands in Northumberland County in Pennsylvania called "Montgomery's Landing" and later Danville, named after Daniel. Under the guidance and assistance of his father, he opened the first store in Danville. Soon he was the trusted merchant and factor of a wide circle of patrons. This first store building was where General William Montgomery House now stands. On November 27, 1791, Daniel Montgomery married Christiana Strawbridge. The next year he laid out the town of Danville — the part east of Mill street. The new town received its baptismal name from the abbreviation of his Christian name, through the partiality of his customers. From this time until his death he was the most prominent man in this part of the State.

Elected to the Legislature in 1802, he at once took his father's place as a trusted leader in the public enterprises and politics of his district. By leading men throughout the State he was recognized as a man of great influence in wisely shaping public affairs. During his active political life of many years he carried on his extensive mercantile establishment, purchased and owned large tracts of land. In 1805 he was lieutenant-colonel in the 81st Pennsylvania Militia. He was appointed major-general of the 9th Division July 27, 1809. He was the chief promoter in the building of turnpike roads in this portion of the State.

Elected to Congress in 1807 as a Democratic-Republican, he served out his term ably and acceptably and declined a reelection. He worked efficiently for the division of Northumberland county and the erection of Columbia and Union counties; Danville was made the county seat of Columbia county, and the father and son donated the land for the county buildings, and contributed largely in money towards their erection. In 1823, though strongly urged by prominent men all over the State, he declined to stand for the office of governor. In 1828 he was appointed one of the canal commissioners, and it was while he was in this office that the great internal State improvements were inaugurated — among others the North Branch canal was located and well advanced towards completion. He was a large stockholder and a strong promoter of the Danville Bridge Company, completing the bridge in 1829. He originated the project of the Danville & Pottsville railroad and was first president of the company.

U.S. House of Representatives
Preceded by Andrew Gregg	Member of the U.S. House of Representatives from Pennsylvania's 5th congressional district 1807–1809	Succeeded by George Smith
