= Corn Palace =

Multi-purpose venue in Mitchell, South Dakota

- The Corn Palace exterior in 2020

General information
- Type: Multi-purpose arena/facility
- Location: 604 North Main Street, Mitchell, South Dakota, U.S.
- Coordinates: 43.714644°N 98.026019°W
- Current tenants: Mitchell HS Kernels (SDHSAA Basketball); Dakota Wesleyan University Tigers (NAIA Basketball)
- Groundbreaking: 1891-92
- Completed: 1921 (dome and minarets added in 1937)
- Owner: City of Mitchell
- Operator: City of Mitchell

Height
- Antenna spire: 26.2 m (86 ft) (flagpole)
- Roof: 20.7 m (68 ft) (dome)

Technical details
- Floor count: 2
- Floor area: 4,042.2 m^{2} (43,510 sq ft)

Design and construction
- Architect: Rapp & Rapp

Other information
- Seating capacity: Basketball: 3,200 Concerts: 3,250

The Corn Palace, commonly advertised as The World's Only Corn Palace and the Mitchell Corn Palace, is a multi-purpose arena/facility located in Mitchell, South Dakota, United States. The Moorish Revival building is decorated with crop art; the murals and designs covering the building are made from corn and other grains, and a new design is constructed each year. The Corn Palace is a popular tourist destination, visited by up to 500,000 people each year.

The Corn Palace serves the community as a venue for concerts, sports event, exhibits and other community events. Each year, the Corn Palace is celebrated with a citywide festival, the Corn Palace Festival. Historically it was held at harvest time in September, but recently it has been held at the end of August. Other popular annual events include the Corn Palace Stampede Rodeo in July and the Corn Palace Polka Festival in September. It is also home to the Dakota Wesleyan University Tigers and the Mitchell High School Kernels basketball teams.

== History ==
In the late 19th century, a number of cities on the Great Plains constructed "crop palaces" (also known as "grain palaces") to promote themselves and their products. As the idea succeeded, it spread, including: a Corn Palace in Sioux City, Iowa, that was active from 1887 to 1891; a Corn Palace in Gregory, South Dakota; a Grain Palace in Plankinton, South Dakota; and a Bluegrass Palace in Creston, Iowa. From 1887 to 1930, at least thirty-four corn palaces were built across the Midwest United States; only the Mitchell Corn Palace has remained intact.

The original Mitchell Corn Palace (known as "The Corn Belt Exposition") was built in 1892 to showcase the rich soil of South Dakota and encourage people to settle in the area. It was a wooden castle structure on Mitchell's Main Street, constructed on land donated by Louis Beckwith, a member of the First Corn Palace Committee. In 1904–1905, the city of Mitchell mounted a challenge to the city of Pierre in an unsuccessful attempt to replace it as the state capital of South Dakota. As part of this effort, the Corn Palace was rebuilt in 1905. In 1921, the Corn Palace was rebuilt once again, with a design by the architectural firm Rapp and Rapp of Chicago. Russian-style onion domes and Moorish minarets were added in 1937, giving the Palace the distinctive appearance that it has today.

In 2004, national media attention was drawn to the Corn Palace, when it received Homeland Security funding. This drew criticism of the Department of Homeland Security (DHS) and its grant program. In 2007, the Corn Palace subsequently received $25,000 in DHS funding for a camera system useful for purposes including Barack Obama's visit in 2008, and as reported by the Mitchell Daily Republic, to protect a "new Fiberglass statue of the Corn Palace mascot Cornelius" in 2009. This statue sits across Main Street, west of the Corn Palace.

The Palace's domes were renovated in 2015 after shaking in strong winds. The new turrets are made of architectural metals.

== Mural construction ==
The exterior corn murals are replaced and redesigned each year with a new theme, with designs created by local artists. From 1948 to 1971, the South-Dakota born Native American artist Oscar Howe designed the panels. Calvin Schultz designed the murals from 1977 to 2002. From 2003 to 2017, the murals were designed by Cherie Ramsdell. No new mural was created in 2006 due to an extreme drought. Beginning in 2018, designs have been created by Dakota Wesleyan University students. As of 2018, it costs an estimated $175,000 each time the Palace is redecorated.

Twelve naturally occurring shades of corn are grown by local farmers to create the artwork. Artists' drawings are transferred to black tar paper labeled with codes corresponding to colors, providing a "corn-by-numbers" pattern showing where each colored cob should be nailed. Corn cobs are split in two lengthwise and nailed to the exterior of the building, using approximately 1.5 million nails and 325,000 ears of corn.

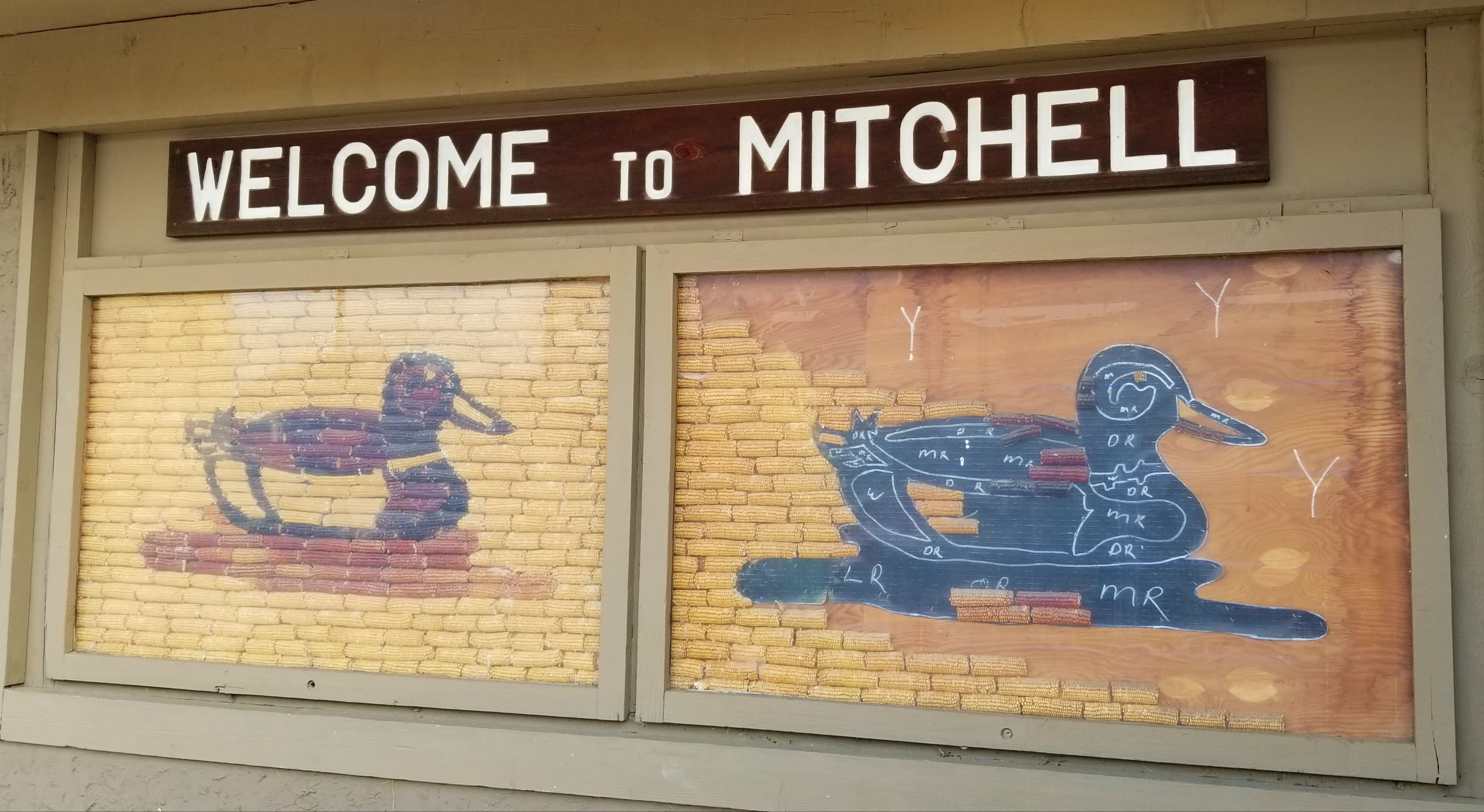
Display demonstrating the "corn-by-numbers" technique used to create murals

== Designs ==
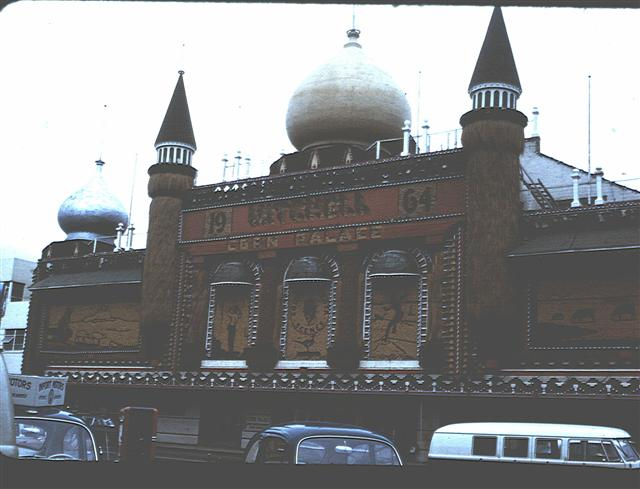
1964 - South Dakota Scenes

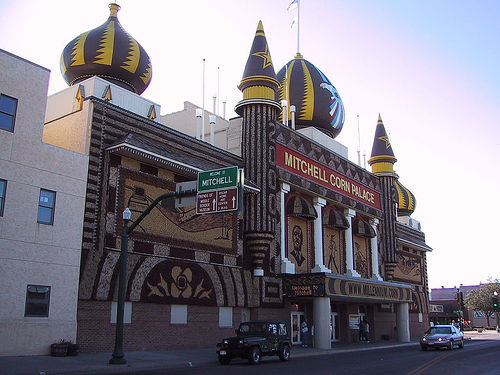
2000 - Millennium Corn

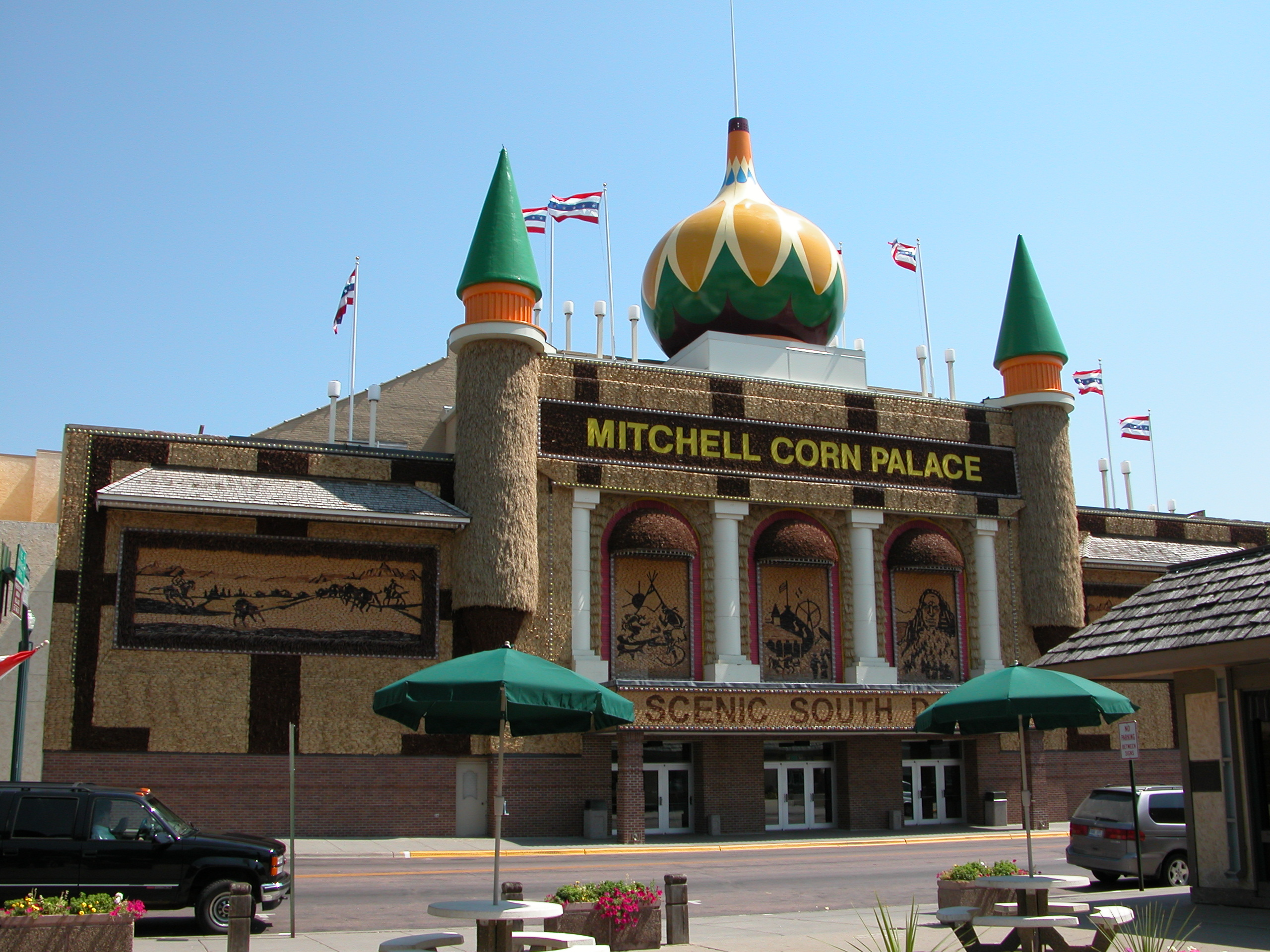
2003 - Scenic South Dakota

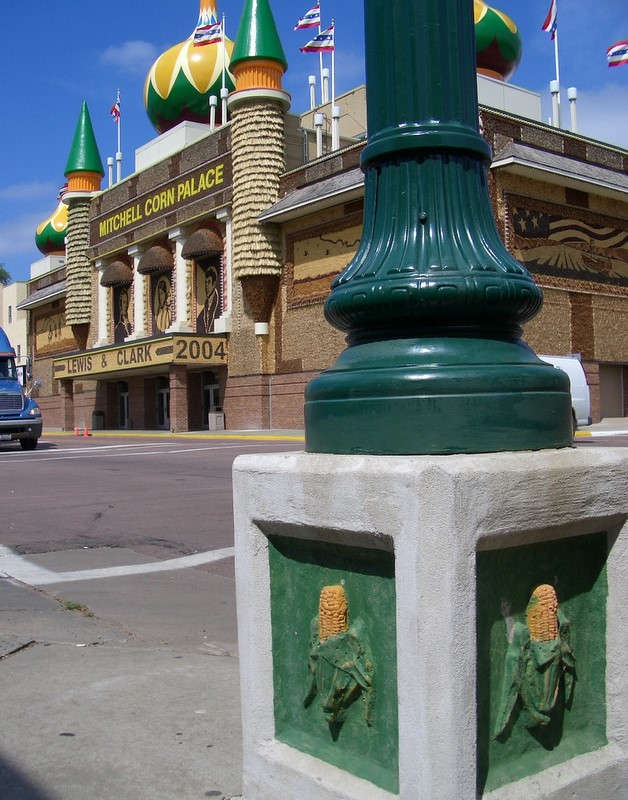
2004 - Lewis & Clark

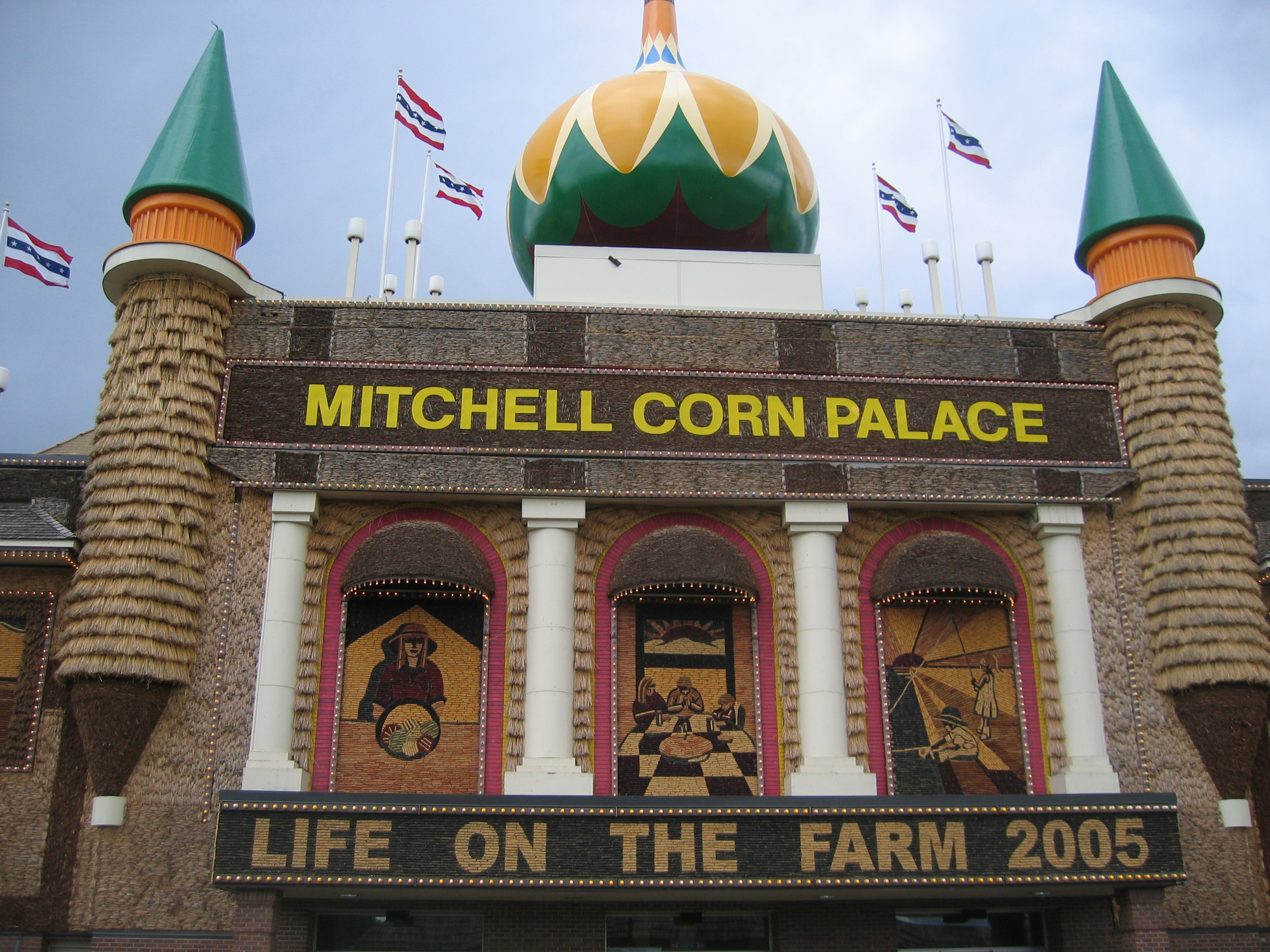
2005 - Life on the Farm

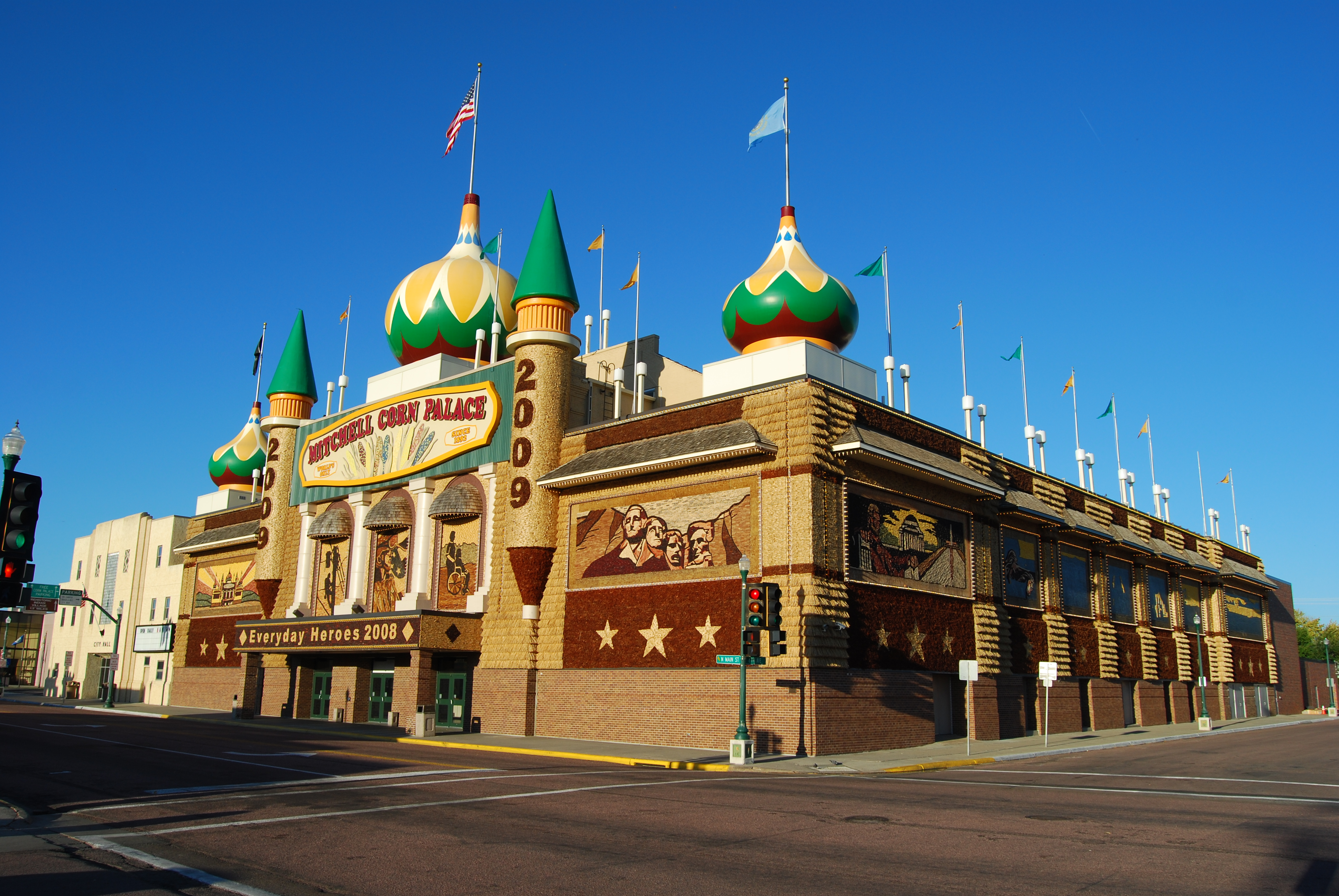
2008 - Everyday Heroes

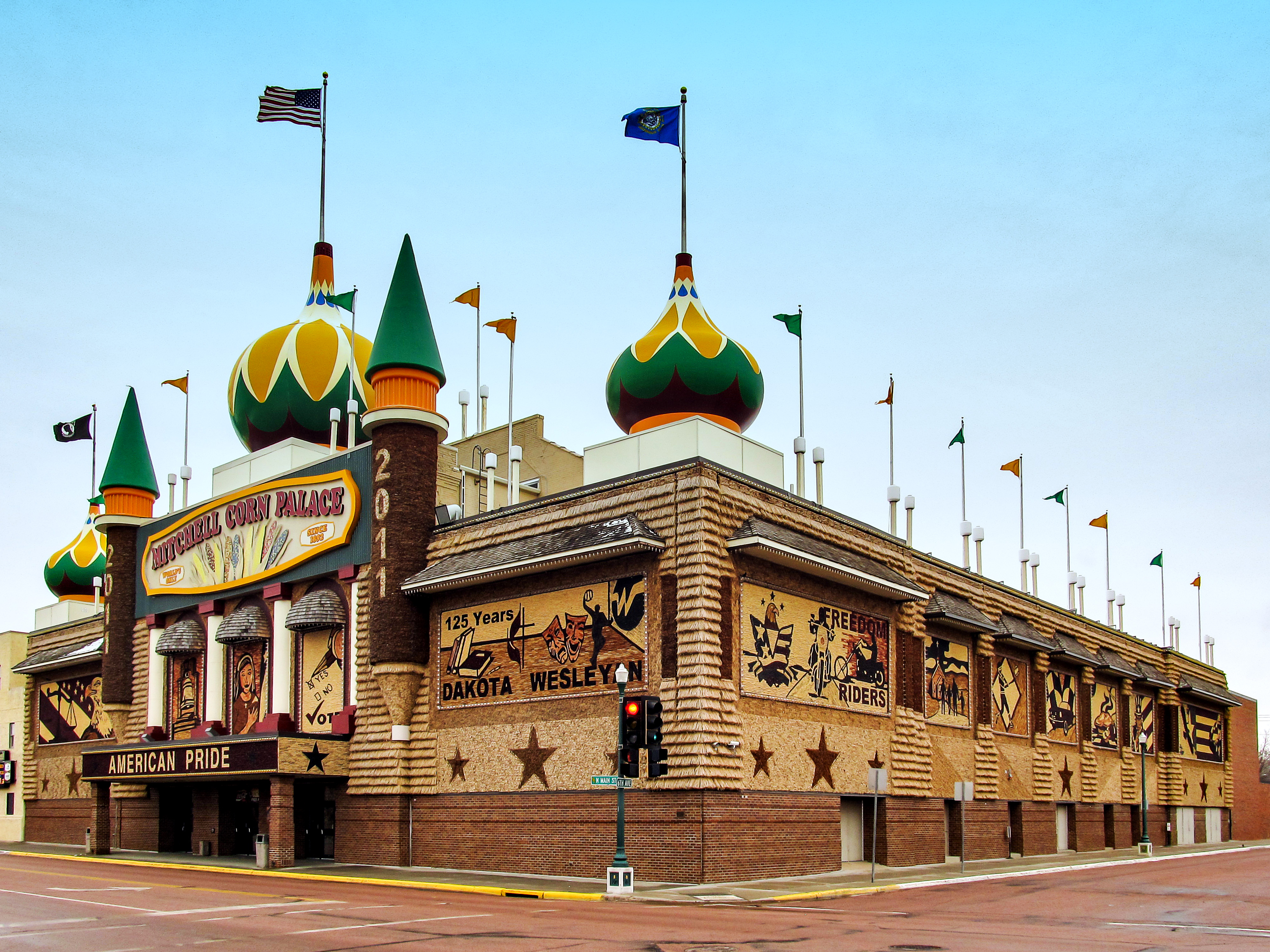
2011 - American Pride

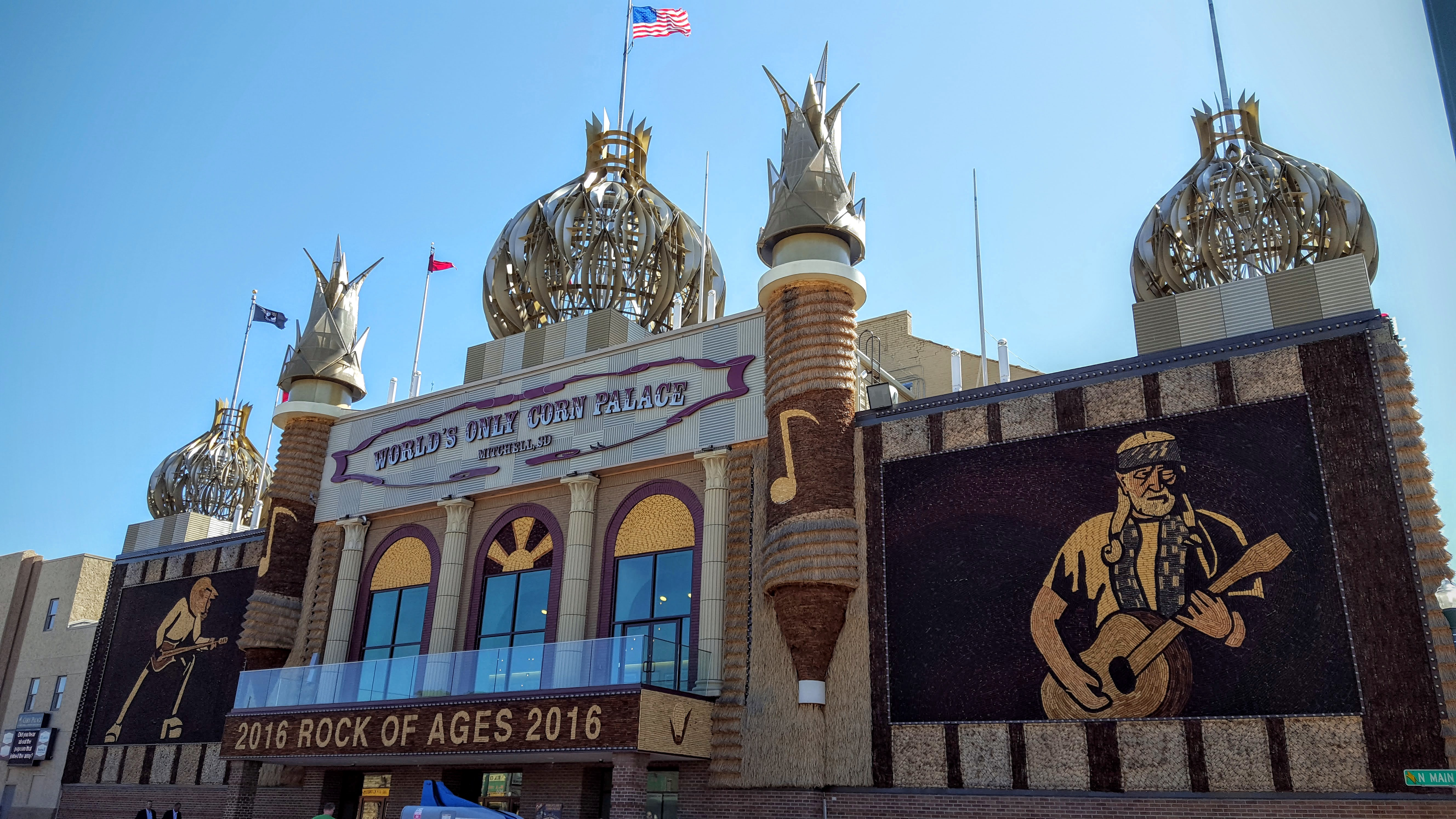
2016 - Rock of Ages

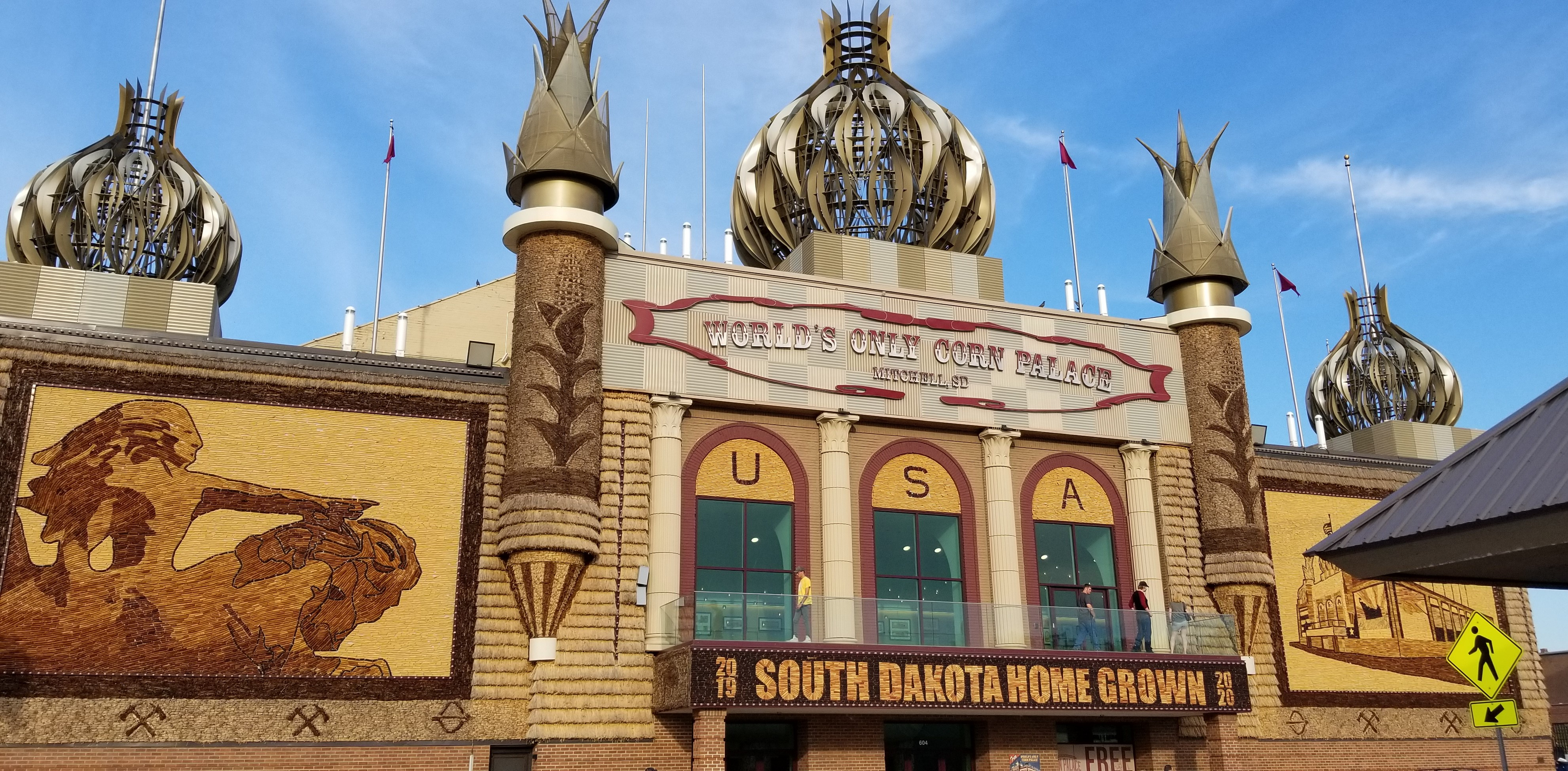
2020 - South Dakota Home Grown

== Bibliography ==
- Briggs, John Ely (1922). "The Sioux City Corn Palaces". The Palimpsest. 3 (10): 313–326. ISSN 0031-0360.
- A Chronological History of the World's Only Corn Palace — Mitchell, SD. Corn Palace Committee. 1992.
- "The World's Corniest Building." LIFE 38:1 (3 Jan 1955), 77.
- Guhin, Paula (2002). The King of Corn, Cal Schultz: Having the Times of His Life. Aberdeen, SD: Prairie Home Press. ISBN 978-0971965805.
- Mitchell Chamber of Commerce. A Year by Year History Of ... The World's Only Corn Palace. 5th ed. Mitchell, SD: Educator Supply Company, 1957.
- Pennington, Robert (1961). Oscar Howe: Artist of the Sioux. Sioux Falls, SD: Dakota Territory Centennial Commission.
- Rubin, Cynthia Elyce (Fall 1983). "The Midwestern Corn Palaces: A 'Maize' of Detail and Wonder". The Clarion: 24–31.
- Schwieder, Dorothy; Swanson, Patricia (Spring 1973). "The Sioux City Corn Palaces". Annals of Iowa. 41 (8): 1209–1227. doi:10.17077/0003-4827.11148. ISSN 0003-4827.
- Simpson, Pamela H. (2005). Breisch, Kenneth A.; Hoagland, Alison K. (eds.). "Cereal Architecture: Late-Nineteenth-Century Grain Palaces and Crop Art". Building Environments: Perspectives in Vernacular Architecture. X. Knoxville: University of Tennessee Press: 269–82. ISBN 978-1572334403.
- Simpson, Pamela H. (2003). "Turn-of-the-Century Midwestern Corn Festivals: Kiosks and Crop Art as American Icons". Arris. 14: 1–15. doi:10.1353/arr.2003.0000. S2CID 244121220.
