= Joes Creek, West Virginia =

- Unincorporated community
- Location within West Virginia Location within the United States
- Coordinates: 38°05′36″N 81°33′25″W
- Country: United States
- State: West Virginia
- County: Boone
- Elevation: 958 ft (292 m)
- Time zone: UTC-5 (Eastern (EST))
  - Summer (DST): UTC-4 (EDT)
- Area codes: 304 & 681
- GNIS feature ID: 1554815

Joes Creek is an unincorporated community and coal town located in Boone County, West Virginia, United States. Joes Creek is 14.5 miles (23.3 km) east-northeast of the town of Madison.
