= General William Montgomery House =

Historic house in Pennsylvania, United States

- Gen. William Montgomery House
- U.S. National Register of Historic Places
- Pennsylvania state historical marker
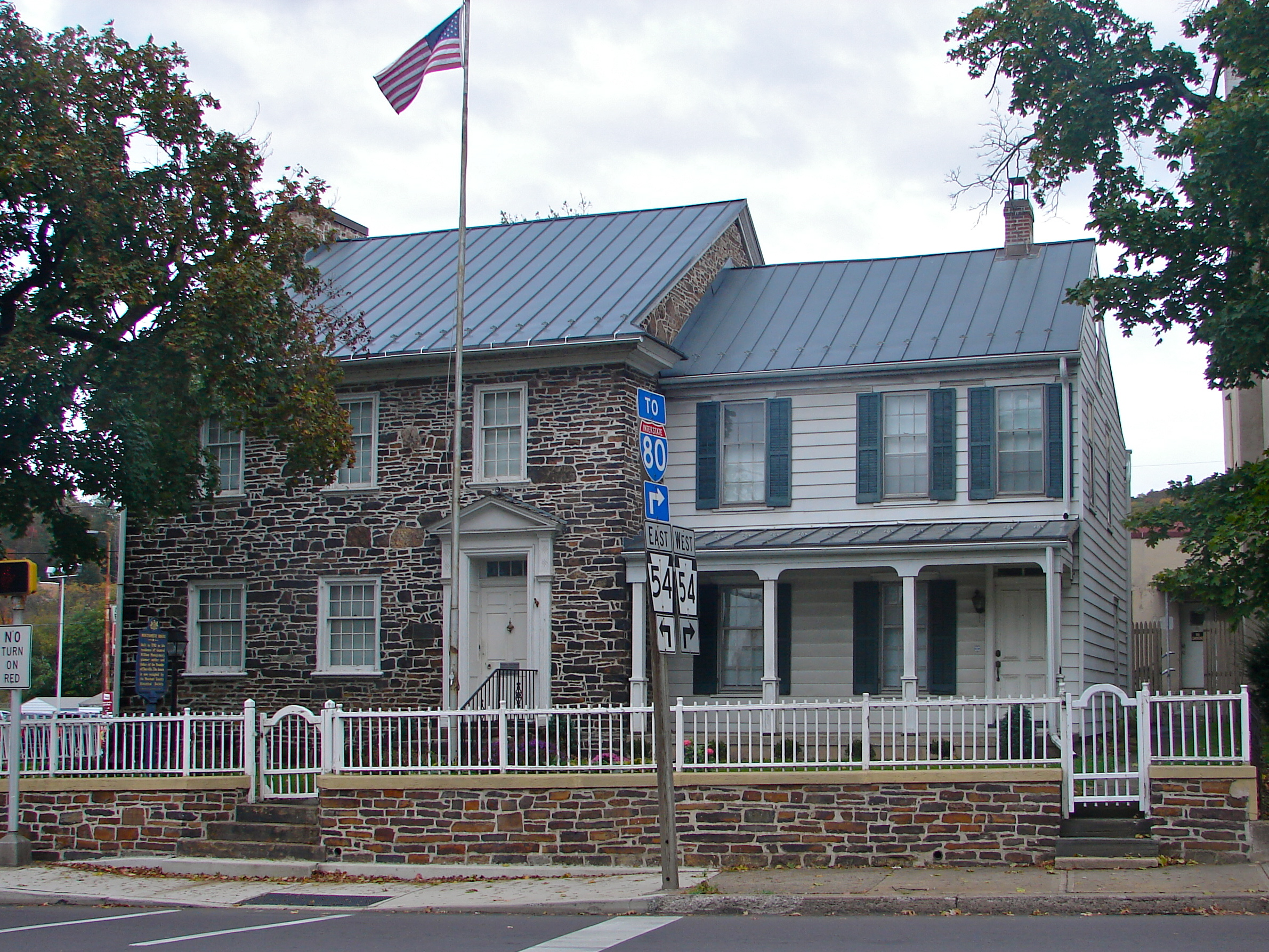

- Location within Pennsylvania Location within the United States
- Location: 1 and 3 Bloom St., Danville, Pennsylvania
- Coordinates: 40°57′52″N 76°37′0″W
- Area: 0.4 acres (0.16 ha)
- Built: 1777
- NRHP reference No.: 79002305

Significant dates
- Added to NRHP: August 09, 1979
- Designated PHMC: May 06, 1952

Gen. William Montgomery House is a historic home located at Danville in Montour County, Pennsylvania. It is a 2 1/2-story stone house with a pedimented gable roof. The main house is three bays by two bays. Attached to the stone structure is a gable-roofed, 2 1/2-story log and frame structure, thought to have been the original Montgomery House and constructed about 1777. It was the home of the developer of Danville, Gen. William Montgomery (1736–1816).

It was listed on the National Register of Historic Places in 1979.

Montgomery House is now owned by the Montour County Historical Society and is open for seasonal tours on Sunday afternoons.

== See also ==
- National Register of Historic Places listings in Montour County, Pennsylvania
