= Joe Creek, South Dakota =

Unincorporated community in South Dakota, U.S.

Coordinates: 44°8′57.39″N 99°47′41.66″W

Joe Creek is an unincorporated community in Hughes County, in the U.S. state of South Dakota.

== History ==
A post office called Joe Creek was established in 1919, and remained in operation until 1954. The community took its name from Joe Creek. Joe Creek had a population of 5 in 1940.

== See also ==
- Joe Creek (South Dakota)
