= Davidson Building (Sioux City, Iowa) =

- U.S. National Register of Historic Places
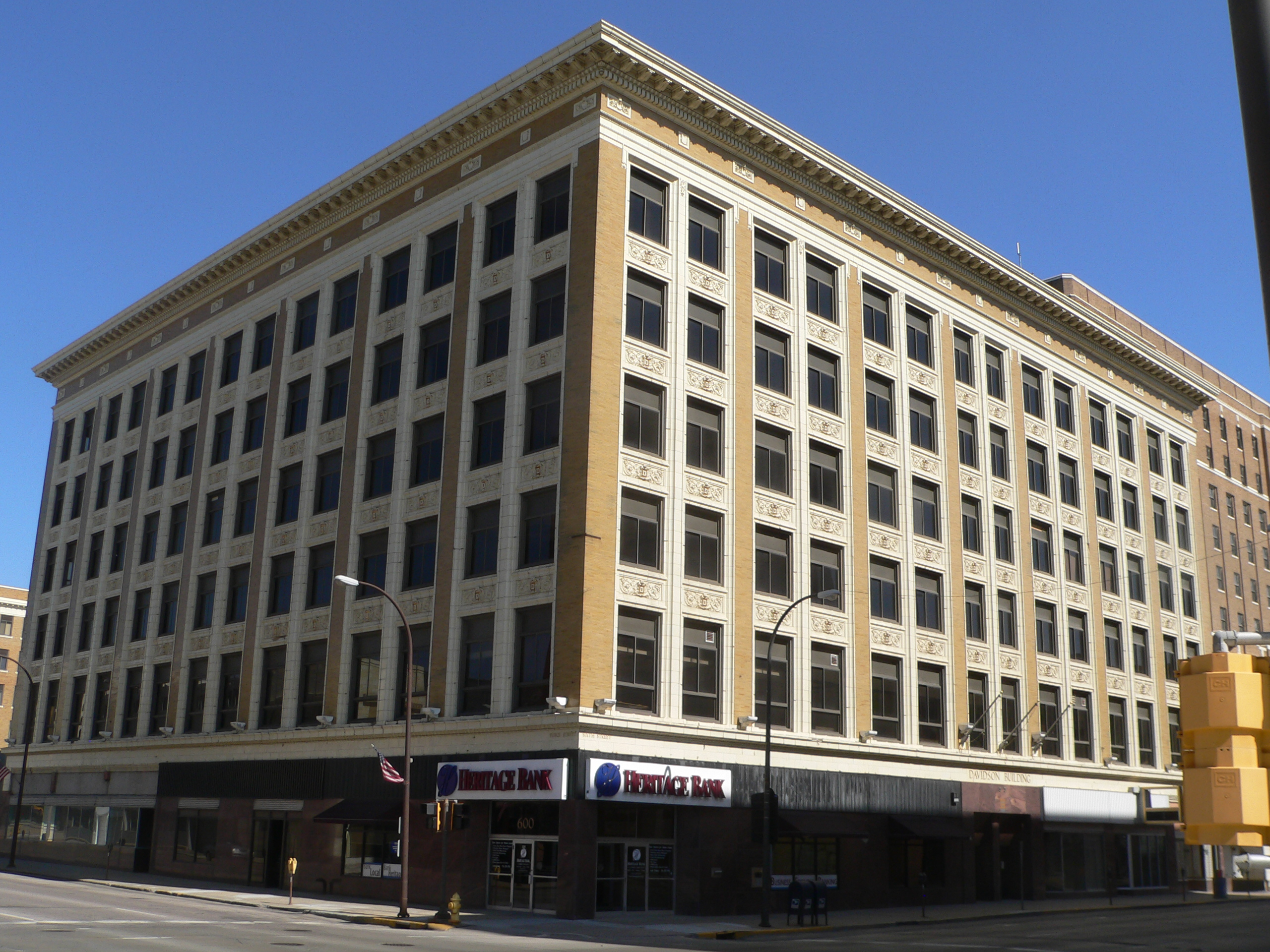

- Location within Iowa Location within the United States
- Location: 505 6th St. Sioux City, Iowa
- Coordinates: 42°29′48″N 96°24′17″W
- Area: less than one acre
- Built: 1913
- Built by: Lytle Construction Company
- Architect: William LaBarthe Steele
- Architectural style: Early Commercial
- NRHP reference No.: 99000736
- Added to NRHP: June 25, 1999

The Davidson Building is a historic building located in Sioux City, Iowa, United States. It was constructed by local businessmen and real estate developers Ben and Dave Davidson. They saw the need for an upscale office building for professionals. They hired prominent local architect William L. Steele to design the Early Commercial-style structure. It was built by the leading contractor in the city, Lytle Construction Company. Completed in 1913, it was Sioux City's first office building. The exterior of the L-shaped, six-story building is composed of terra cotta panels separated by vertical bands of Roman style brick, and capped with an ornate cornice. It is Sullivanesque in its design. Commercial space is located on the first floor, and office space occupies the upper floors. The building was listed on the National Register of Historic Places in 1999. In 2016 plans were unveiled to convert the building and the adjacent Warrior Hotel into a boutique hotel and apartments. The Davidson Building houses The Warrior Apartments, as well as 56 guest rooms for The Warrior Hotel on its second, third and fourth floors.
