= Joe Creek (Oklahoma) =

Joe Creek is a tributary of the Arkansas River in Tulsa County, Oklahoma. The stream headwaters arise just north of U.S. Route 64 in Tulsa and flow south-southwest for approximately seven miles to its confluence with the Arkansas River just north of the Creek Turnpike at 36°01′55″N 95°57′24″W.

== History ==
Joe Creek is named for Josiah Perryman, a prominent early settler and postmaster in Tulsa during the late 19th century. Perryman operated a ranch along the creek and helped establish Tulsa’s first post office in 1878. The surrounding land was originally part of the Creek Nation in Indian Territory, and the area developed as Tulsa expanded southward during the oil boom of the early 20th century.

Flooding has historically shaped development along Joe Creek. The flood of record occurred in October 1959, inundating neighborhoods and prompting calls for improved stormwater management. Tulsa’s vulnerability to flash floods led to major flood control initiatives beginning in the 1970s, including channelization projects and participation in the National Flood Insurance Program.

== Local protection project ==
Construction of the Joe Creek Flood Protection Project began in March 1978 and was completed in November 1980. The lower portion was built by a private developer, while the upper section was managed by the City of Tulsa. The project includes 10,800 feet of channel improvements along Joe Creek, 300 feet along Little Joe Creek, 360 feet along South Fork Creek, and 1,200 feet along an east bank tributary. Approximately 8,950 feet of the upstream channel is concrete-lined, while the remainder features stone slope protection.

Subsequent rehabilitation projects addressed erosion and structural failures in the downstream reach between East 71st Street and East 61st Street. Modern stabilization measures include riprap, armor cable, and retaining walls using the Redi-Rock system to prevent bank collapse and protect residential properties.

== Environmental and watershed management ==
Joe Creek is part of Tulsa’s stormwater drainage network and contributes to the Arkansas River watershed. Increased urbanization has led to higher runoff volumes, requiring comprehensive watershed studies and master drainage plans. The creek corridor also provides habitat for local wildlife and serves as a greenway for flood mitigation and recreation.

== Recreation ==
The Joe Creek Trail connects to the Tulsa River Parks system, offering approximately two miles of multi-use paths for walking, biking, and jogging. Trailheads are located near East 61st Street and Helmerich Park, with connections to the River Parks East Bank Trail. The area is popular for outdoor activities and links residential neighborhoods to the Arkansas River corridor.

== Tributaries ==
- Little Joe Creek
- South Fork Creek
