= Warrior Hotel =

- U.S. National Register of Historic Places
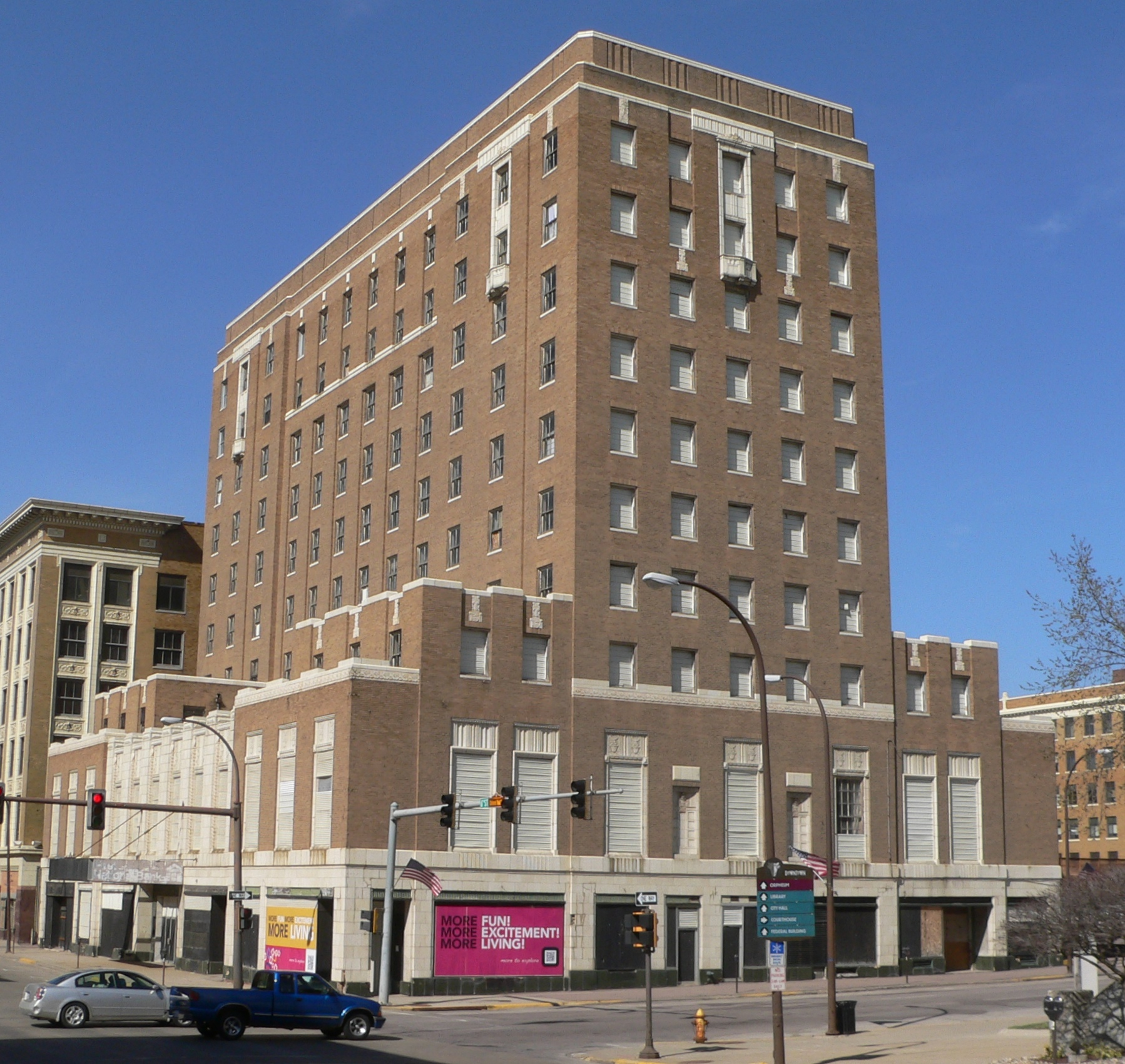
- View from the southeast, across 6th and Nebraska Streets

- Location within Iowa Location within the United States
- Location: 6th and Nebraska Sts. Sioux City, Iowa
- Coordinates: 42°29′47.6″N 96°24′14.1″W
- Built: 1930
- Architect: Alonzo H. Gentry
- Architectural style: Art Deco
- NRHP reference No.: 85001384
- Added to NRHP: June 27, 1985

The Warrior Hotel is a historic hotel opened in 1930 and restored in 2020, located in downtown Sioux City, Iowa, United States.

== Description ==
The building is eleven stories tall, and rises 128 feet (39 m) above the ground. The building was designed by Kansas City architect Alonzo H. Gentry in the Art Deco style. The brick exterior features terra cotta ornamentation. The hotel opened on December 20, 1930, built by the Eppley Hotel Company. Eppley was bought by Sheraton Hotels in 1956, and the hotel was renamed the Sheraton-Warrior. Sheraton remodeled the hotel in 1962, moving the lobby from the second floor to the ground floor and converting the hotel to a motel, renaming it the Sheraton-Warrior Motor Inn. In 1968, Sheraton sold the hotel to Gotham Hotels Limited, along with seventeen other aging properties, and it was renamed the Warrior Motor Inn. The hotel closed in 1971 following a strike by employees, but was sold and reopened the following year as the Aventino Motor Inn. It closed permanently in 1976. It was listed on the National Register of Historic Places in 1985.

The structure was tagged for building violations in the late 1990s, but was given a reprieve by the city due to its historical significance and the estimated $5 million it would cost to demolish. In 2006, the interior was gutted in preparation for converting the building into low-income senior housing, but the project stalled for lack of financing.

In November 2012, a group led by the Winnebago Tribe of Nebraska applied for a gaming license for a proposed $122-million casino and entertainment complex that would integrate the Warrior and the neighboring Davidson Building. State gaming regulators rejected the bid, awarding the license instead to a Hard Rock Casino to be built at the city's historic Battery Building.

In July 2017, Restoration St. Louis & Warrior ownership announced a plan to renovate the Warrior Hotel and adjacent Davidson Building into a 148-room Marriott Autograph Hotel at an estimated $73M. The hotel reopened in September 2020.
