= Joe Creek (South Dakota) =

Stream in South Dakota, U.S.

Coordinates: 44°08′34″N 99°47′33″W

Joe Creek is a stream in the U.S. state of South Dakota.

The creek was named for Joe Arnold, an Indian who often sold firewood to the local riverboat traffic.

== See also ==
- List of rivers of South Dakota
