= The Visitors (installation) =

2012 art installation by Ragnar Kjartansson

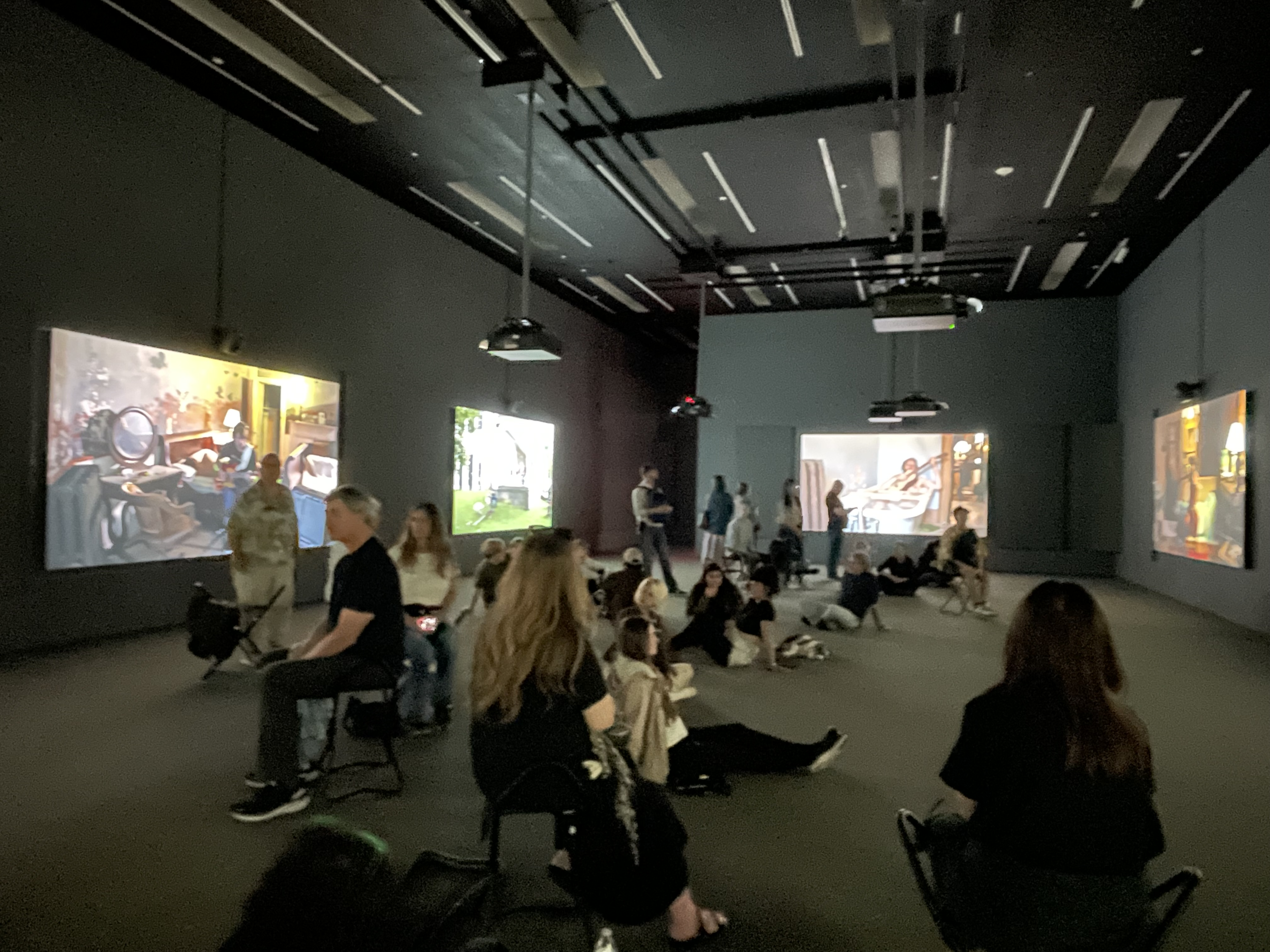
- The Visitors at SFMOMA in August 2025
- Artist: Ragnar Kjartansson
- Year: 2012
- Type: Installation art; video art
- Location: Shown in several places, including The Broad and The Guggenheim

The Visitors is a 2012 installation and video art piece created by Ragnar Kjartansson. Kjartansson named the piece for The Visitors, the final album by the Swedish pop band ABBA before their reunion in 2016. The piece was commissioned by the Migros Museum in Zurich, and was one of the museum's inaugural exhibits. The premiere of the piece marked Kjartansson's first solo show in Switzerland.

== Installation ==
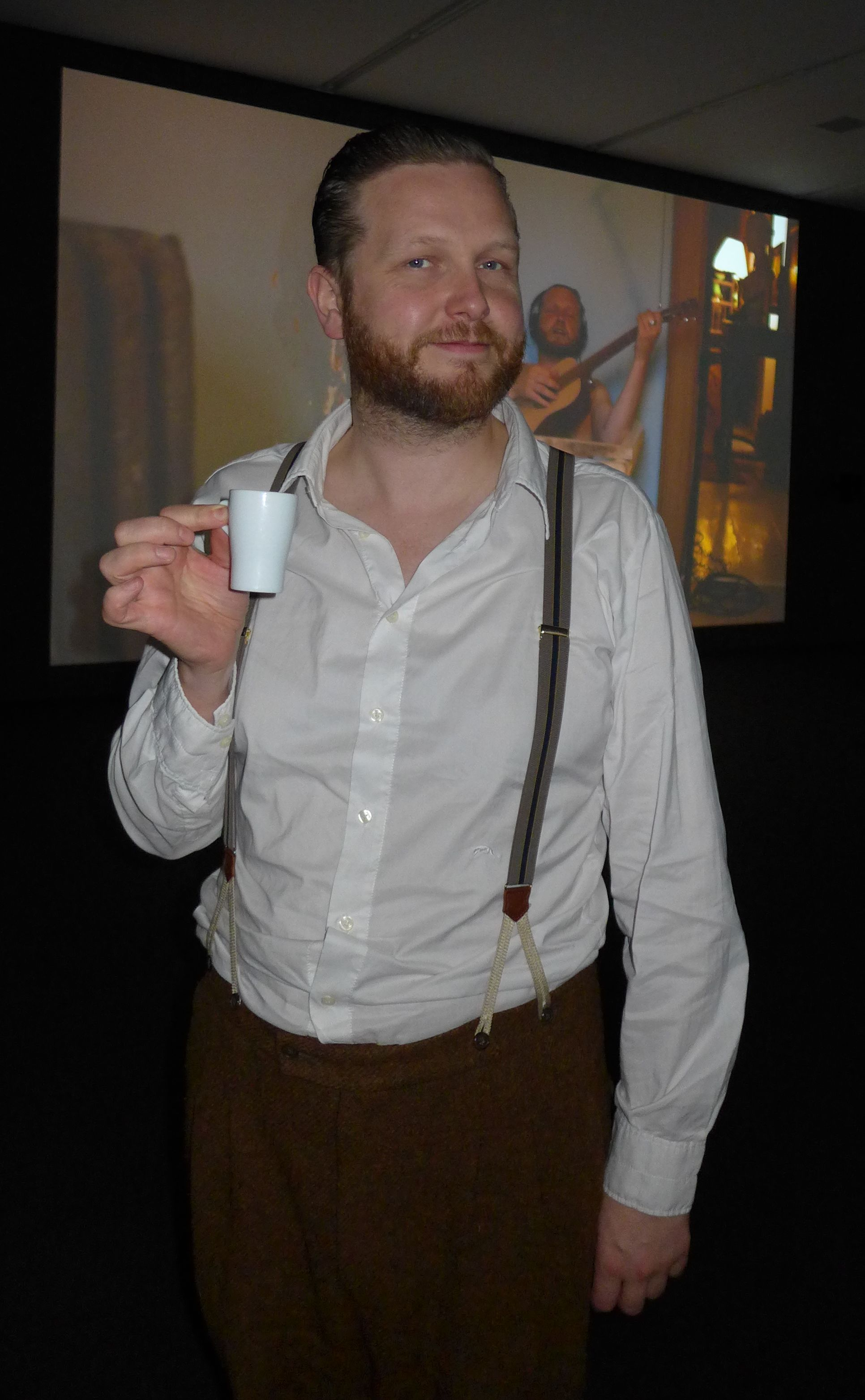
Ragnar Kjartansson standing in the Migros Museum, in Zurich, with a still image of his performance in The Visitors behind him.

The Visitors constitutes the performance of a song written by Ásdís Sif Gunnarsdóttir, Kjartansson's ex-wife. The piece is displayed across nine different screens, each featuring musicians or artists either by themselves or in groups in different rooms of a house, or outside, performing simultaneously but separately. One screen features Kjartansson by himself. Others featured in the piece include friends of Kjartansson, both from the artist's native Reykjavík and elsewhere, as well as residents of Rokeby Farm, where the piece was filmed.

=== Exhibition ===
The piece was originally shown at the Migros Museum in Switzerland, and premiered in the United States in early 2013 at the Luhring Augustine Gallery. The piece has since been displayed in several museums around the world, including the Gund Gallery at Kenyon College in Gambier, Ohio (the first North American showing of the piece), The Broad in Los Angeles, The Guggenheim in Bilbao, the Institute of Contemporary Art in Boston, the Turner House Gallery in Penarth, the Hirshhorn Museum and Sculpture Garden in Washington, D.C., the Frist Center for the Visual Arts in Nashville, Tennessee, the San Francisco Museum of Modern Art, the Phoenix Art Museum, the Dallas Museum of Art, the Museum of Contemporary Art in Montreal, Canada, Louisiana Museum of Modern Art in Denmark and the Buffalo AKG Art Museum.

== Filming ==
The piece was filmed at Rokeby Farm, located in upstate New York, near Barrytown. Rokeby is a home and estate that at one point belonged to the Astor family, and later the Livingston family. The property is now inhabited by various descendants of both families, and other tenants. The property was the site of an earlier 2007 piece by Kjartansson, titled The Blossoming Trees Performance, during which he recorded himself as a plein-air painter for two days. The estate has also been used by other artists, due to the unique interiors of the main house on the property.

== Cast and Crew ==
=== Musicians ===
- Ragnar Kjartansson – acoustic guitar, creator
- Davíð Þór Jónsson – piano, harmonica, hurdy-gurdy, co-composer
- Gyða Valtýsdóttir – cello
- Kristín Anna Valtýsdóttir – accordion, acoustic guitar
- Shahzad Ismaily – banjo, electric guitar
- Kjartan Sveinsson – piano, bass guitar
- Ólafur Jónsson – electric guitar
- Þorvaldur H. Gröndal – drums
- Alex Khan – acoustic guitar
- "Rokeby Choir" – backing vocalists

=== Also on film ===
- Jacqueline Falcone – "The Sleeping Beauty"
- Ania Aldrich – co-owner of Rokeby Estate
- Ricky Aldrich – co-owner of Rokeby Estate

=== Additional personnel ===
- Asdis Sif Gunnarsdottir – lyricist
- Tómas Örn Tómasson – director of photography
- Hákon Sverrisson – 1st assistant camera operator
- Richard Welnowsky – 2nd assistant camera operator
- Christopher McDonald – director of sound

== Reception ==
The piece has been positively reviewed, with critics highlighting Kjartansson's focus on repetition, a recurring theme in his performances.

In September 2019, The Guardian ranked The Visitors first in their Best Art of the 21st Century list, with critic Adrian Searle calling it "a kind of extended farewell to romanticism".
