= Horatio Gates Armstrong =

American soldier

- Born: June 1, 1790; Red Hook, New York, U.S.
- Died: April 6, 1858 (aged 67); Baltimore, Maryland, U.S.
- Spouse: Mary Hughes (m. 1814)
- Children: 3
- Relatives: John Armstrong Jr. (father); John Armstrong Sr. (grandfather); James Armstrong (uncle)
- Military career
- Allegiance: United States
- Branch: United States Army
- Service years: 1812–1813 (U.S. Army)
- Rank: Major (U.S. Army)
- Conflicts: War of 1812

Horatio Gates Armstrong (June 1, 1790 – April 6, 1858) was an American soldier who fought in the War of 1812.

== Early life and career ==
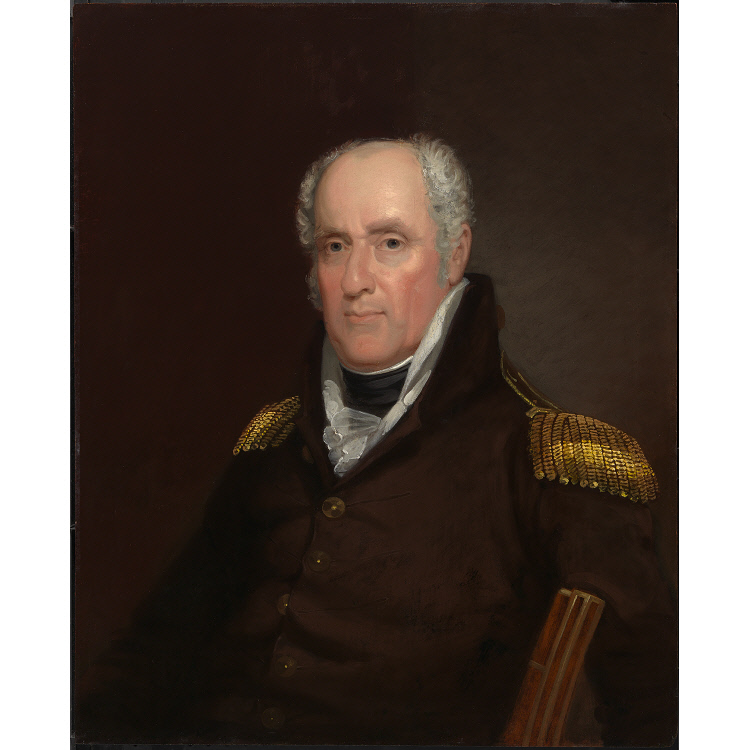
Portrait of Armstrong's father by John Wesley Jarvis

Armstrong was born on June 1, 1790, and was named after General Horatio Gates, whom his father had been aide to during the American Revolutionary War. He was the eldest of seven children born to John Armstrong Jr. and Alida (née Livingston) Armstrong (1761–1822), who married in 1789. His father served as a Continental Congressman, a U.S. Senator, U.S. Secretary of War, U.S. Minister to France.

Among his siblings was Henry Beekman Armstrong, also a soldier in the War of 1812; John Armstrong III, who became a gentleman farmer at La Bergerie; Robert Livingston Armstrong; Margaret Rebecca Armstrong (who married William Backhouse Astor Sr.); James Kosciuszko Armstrong and William Armstrong.

His paternal grandparents were General John Armstrong and Rebecca (née Lyon) Armstrong. Among his Armstrong family, who were of "distinguished Scottish descent," was uncle James Armstrong, a physician who became a U.S. Congressman. His paternal grandparents were Judge Robert Livingston and Margaret (née Beekman) Livingston. Among his Livingston family members were uncles Chancellor Robert R. Livingston and Edward Livingston.

During the War of 1812, Armstrong fought on the American side, heading a company known as the Capt. Horatio G. Armstrong Co. with the 23rd Regiment Infantry. He was eventually promoted to Major.

== Personal life ==
In 1814, Armstrong was married to Baltimore native Mary Hughes (1791–1866). Mary was the youngest daughter of Margaret (née Sanderson) Hughes and Christopher Hughes, a banker and investor in real estate originally from County Wexford, Ireland. Among her siblings was older brother, Christopher Hughes (who served as the U.S. Minister to Sweden and the Netherlands), and older sister Louisa Hughes (the wife of George Armistead). Together they had three children:

- John Horatio Armstrong (1815–1886), who married Caroline Amelia Scheldt (1828–1912) in 1844.
- Margaret Hughes Armstrong (1817–1870)
- Christopher Hughes Armstrong (1821–1884)

Armstrong died at his residence near Baltimore on April 6, 1858. His widow was the administratrix of his estate.
