= Josh Smith (artist) =

American artist based in New York City (born 1976)

- Born: 1976 (age 49–50); Okinawa, Japan
- Occupation: artist

Joshua Smith (born 1976) is an American artist based in New York City.

== Biography ==
Smith was born in Okinawa, Japan and raised in Tennessee. Trained as a printmaker, he initially began working with collages in the early 2000s. He combined photocopies, documents and drawing in layers to create abstract images reacting to surreal and expressionist ways of painting.

He first became known in the early 2000s, however, for a body of work that consisted of paintings featuring letters from his own name: Smith used the letters as a base for building abstract imagery. In recent years, he has made numerous partly-figurative series, including series featuring palm trees, skeletons, fishes and devils, among other varied themes. He also makes artist books and collages. Amongst Smith's favourite and more famous motifs is the Grim Reaper, which first appeared in 11 works for his 2017 solo exhibition at STANDARD (OSLO).

He also makes artist books, sculptures, ceramics, and collages.

Smith attended Miami University from 1994 to 1996 and the University of Tennessee from 1996 to 1998.

== Exhibitions ==
=== Solo exhibitions ===
- Josh Smith: Life Drawing, The Drawing Center, New York, NY, USA 2024
- Josh Smith: Keyhole, Xavier Hufkens, Brussels 2022
- Josh Smith Spectre at David Zwirner, London 2020
- Josh Smith at Bonner Kunstverein, Bonn 2016
- The American Dream at The Brant Foundation Art, Greenwich, Connecticut 2011
- Josh Smith at Deitch Studios, New York 2010
- Josh Smith at Luhring Augustine, New York City 2009
- Josh Smith at Jonathan Viner Gallery, London, 2007

=== Group exhibitions ===
- The Forever Now: Contemporary Painting in an Atemporal World, MOMA, New York, 2015
- Josh Smith in Surface to Surface, Jonathan Viner Gallery, London 2012
- Barbaric Freedom at Simon Lee, London 2010
- Josh Smith, Sophie von Hellermann at Museum Dhondt-Dhaenens, Deurle, 2010
