= Ragnar Kjartansson (performance artist) =

Contemporary Icelandic artist

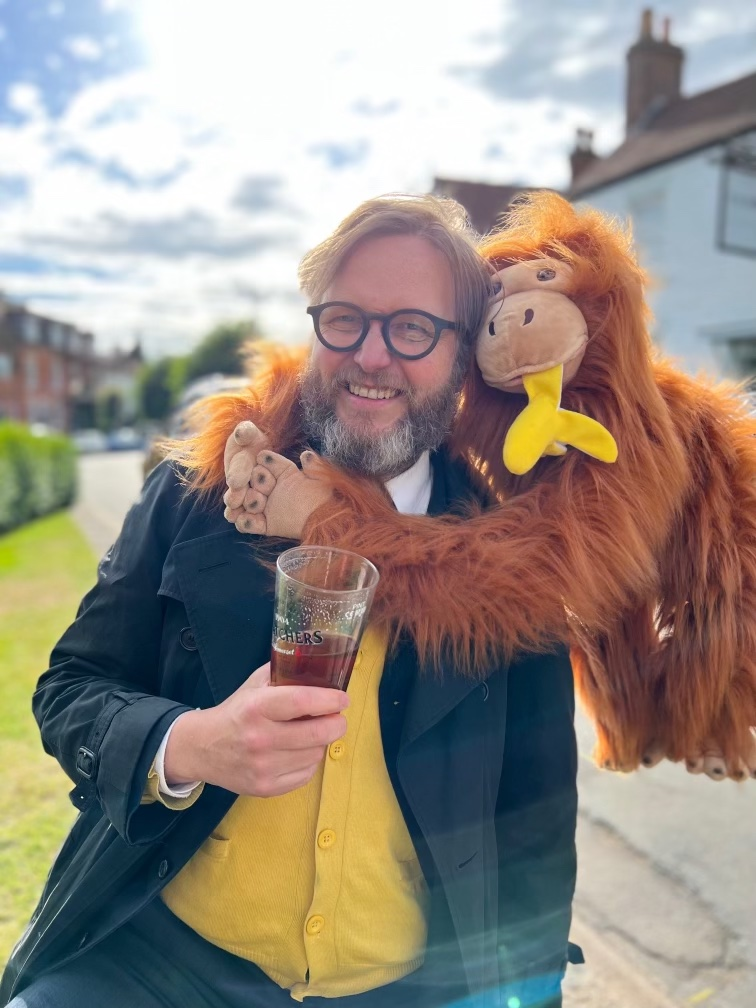
Ragnar Kjartansson, 2022

Ragnar Kjartansson ([ˈraknar̥ cʰar̥tansɔn]) is an Icelandic contemporary artist who engages multiple artistic mediums, creating video installations, performances, drawings, and paintings that draw upon myriad historical and cultural references. An underlying pathos and irony connect his works, with each deeply influenced by the comedy and tragedy of classical theater. The artist blurs the distinctions between mediums, approaching his painting practice as performance, likening his films to paintings, and his performances to sculpture. Throughout, Ragnar conveys an interest in beauty and its banality, and he uses durational, repetitive performance as a form of exploration.

Ragnar (b. 1976) lives and works in Reykjavík. Major solo shows include exhibitions at Reykjavík Art Museum, Reykjavík; the Barbican Centre, London; the Hirshhorn Museum and Sculpture Garden, Washington D.C.; the Musée d'art contemporain de Montréal; the Palais de Tokyo, Paris; the New Museum, New York; the Migros Museum of Contemporary Art, Zurich; the Fondazione Sandretto Re Rebaudengo, Turin; the Frankfurter Kunstverein; Louisiana Museum in Humlebæk, Denmark; the BAWAG Contemporary, Vienna, amongst others. Ragnar participated in The Encyclopedic Palace at the Venice Biennale in 2013, Manifesta 10 in St. Petersburg, Russia in 2014, and he represented Iceland at the 2009 Venice Biennale. He returned to the Venice Biennale in 2013 to show SS Hanover. He is the recipient of the 2015 Artes Mundi's Derek Williams Trust Purchase Award, and Performa's 2011 Malcolm McLaren Award.

== Early life ==
Ragnar Kjartansson was born in Reykjavík, Iceland to Kjartan Ragnarsson and Guðrún Ásmundsdóttir. His mother is a well-known actress in Iceland and his father is a director and playwright.

He was in and out of bands growing up, most notably as a member of the Icelandic band Trabant, an electronic-pop/rock band from Reykjavík, Iceland, known for its raw but powerful music and flamboyant live performances. Trabant's style of music is a blend of electronic music, punk, R&B and pop.

Ragnar graduated from the Iceland Academy of the Arts in 2001 and studied at the Royal Academy of Arts in Stockholm, in 2000, as an exchange student.

== Selected works and projects ==
=== No Tomorrow ===
No Tomorrow is a video installation by Ragnar, choreographer Margrét Bjarnadóttir, and composer Bryce Dessner. Spanning six screens that encircle the room, the installation surrounds viewers with a performance of spatial music written for eight dancers with eight guitars. Recorded from the center of the performers’ space, the installation is kaleidoscopic, capturing the dancers as they weave within each screen and across the channels; their movements and melodies ranging from pastorale to rock and roll. Combining a variety of classic Western references – blue jeans and white t-shirts, the draped silk curtains of mid-20th century song and dance films, as well as lyrics drawn from the Archaic Greek poet Sappho and adventurer Vivant Denon, two sensualists millennia apart – the work spins notions of idealization and iconography. It is also a reflection on our ideals of beauty, our search for it, and the absurdity of its representations, inspired by the frivolity and reality of Rococo paintings, classical ballet, and modern pop music videos. The performance was initially commissioned for the Iceland Dance Company in 2017.

=== Me and My Mother ===
Me and My Mother is an ongoing performance collaboration with Ragnar's mother where she repeatedly spits in his face. The performance is filmed every five years and began in 2000.

In 2015, Ragnar's mother Guðrún G. Ásmundsdóttir wrote about the performance: "It is trying for a mother and an actress with a fifty year acting career to spit on her own son – the son who has never been anything but a true blessing and has always made her laugh should life get difficult around them. This performance would never have existed had it not been for the enduring love and true respect they have for one another."

=== A Lot of Sorrow ===
MoMA PS1 presented the durational performance, A Lot of Sorrow, by Ragnar featuring The National on 5 May 2013. The band performed their song Sorrow a consecutive 99 times over the course of 6 hours.

=== The Visitors ===
The Visitors is a 2012 installation and video art piece created by Ragnar. He named the piece for The Visitors, the final album by the Swedish pop band ABBA. The piece was commissioned by the Migros Museum in Zurich, and was one of the museum's inaugural exhibits. The premiere of the piece marked Ragnar's first solo show in Switzerland.

The Visitors constitutes the performance of a song written by Ásdís Sif Gunnarsdóttir, Ragnar's ex-wife. The piece is displayed across nine different screens, each featuring musicians or artists either by themselves or in groups in different rooms of a house, or outside, performing simultaneously but separately. One screen features Ragnar by himself. Others featured in the piece include Ragnar's friends, both from the artist's native Reykjavík and elsewhere, as well as residents of Rokeby Farm, where the piece was filmed.

The piece was originally shown at the Migros Museum in Switzerland, and premiered in the United States in early 2013 at the Luhring Augustine Gallery. The piece has since been displayed in several museums around the world, including The Broad in Los Angeles, The Guggenheim in New York City, the Montreal Museum of Contemporary Art, the Institute of Contemporary Art in Boston, the Turner House Gallery in Penarth, the Hirshhorn Museum and Sculpture Garden in Washington, D.C., the Frist Center for the Visual Arts in Nashville, Tennessee, and the San Francisco Museum of Modern Art. The piece returned to the Institute of Contemporary Art in February 2019. The piece came to the Dallas Museum of Art in September 2019. It also went to the High Museum of Art in 2021 where it was displayed with Postcards to Marguerite "that draws a literary parallel to the musical exchange between friends in The Visitors."

The piece was filmed at Rokeby Farm, located in upstate New York, near Barrytown. Rokeby is a home and estate that at one point belonged to the Astor family, and later the Livingston family. The property is now inhabited by various descendants of both families, and other tenants. The property was the site of an earlier 2007 piece by Ragnar, titled The Blossoming Trees Performance, during which he recorded himself as a plein-air painter for two days. The estate has also been used by other artists, due to the unique interiors of the main house on the property.

=== The Palace of the Summerland ===
In 2014, Thyssen-Bornemisza Art Contemporary (TBA21) commissioned Ragnar and a group of 20 artists, musicians, and friends to create the two-part project The Palace of the Summerland.

=== The End ===
In 2009, Ragnar was selected as the official Icelandic representation at the 53rd International Art Exhibition – La Biennale di Venezia.

=== Death Is Elsewhere ===
In 2019, the Metropolitan Museum of Art premiered Death Is Elsewhere, a seven-channel video installation.

== Recognition ==
In 2016, Ragnar was honored as the year's Reykjavík City Artist. This is an honorary award, given to an artist who is believed to have excelled and made his mark on Icelandic art.

== Literature ==
- Ragnar Kjartansson: Epic Waste of Love and Understanding, Malou Wedel Bruun & Tine Colstrup (ed.), Humlebæk (Louisiana Museum of Modern Art) 2023, ISBN 978-87-93659-68-1
- Ragnar Kjartansson: não sofra mais, Carina Correia & Daniel Madeira (ed.), Coimbra (Círculo de Artes Plásticas de Coimbra) 2023, ISBN 978-972-8679-36-1
- Ragnar Kjartansson: Scheize Liebe Sehnsucht, Ulrike Groos & Carolin Wurzbacher (ed.), Berlin (Distanz) 2019, ISBN 978-3-95476-284-2
- Ragnar Kjartansson, Leila Hasham (ed.), London (Barbican; Koenig Books), 2016. ISBN 978-3-86335-970-6
- Ragnar Kjartansson, Scenes from Western Culture & A Lot of Sorrow, Jannie Haagemann (ed.), Copenhagen (Copenhagen Contemporary) 2016, ISBN 978-87-999426-2-6
- Ragnar Kjartansson, Frédéric Grossi (ed.), Paris (Palais de Tokyo), 2015. ISBN 978-2-84711-062-3
- Ragnar Kjartansson: Me, My Mother, My Father, and I, Massimiliano Gioni & Margot Norton (ed.), New York (New Museum), 2014. ISBN 978-0-915557-02-8
- Ragnar Kjartansson: To Music/An die Musik, Heike Munder (ed.), Zurich (Migros Museum für Gegenwartskunst; JRP Ringier), 2012. ISBN 978-3-03764-423-2
- Ragnar Kjartansson: The End, Christian Schoen (ed.), Ostfildern (Hatje Cantz) 2009, ISBN 978-3-7757-2333-6
- Icelandic Art Today (ed. by Christian Schoen and Halldór Björn Runólfsson), Hatje-Cantz, Ostfildern 2009 ISBN 978-3-7757-2295-7
