= St. Margaret's Home =

- U.S. National Register of Historic Places
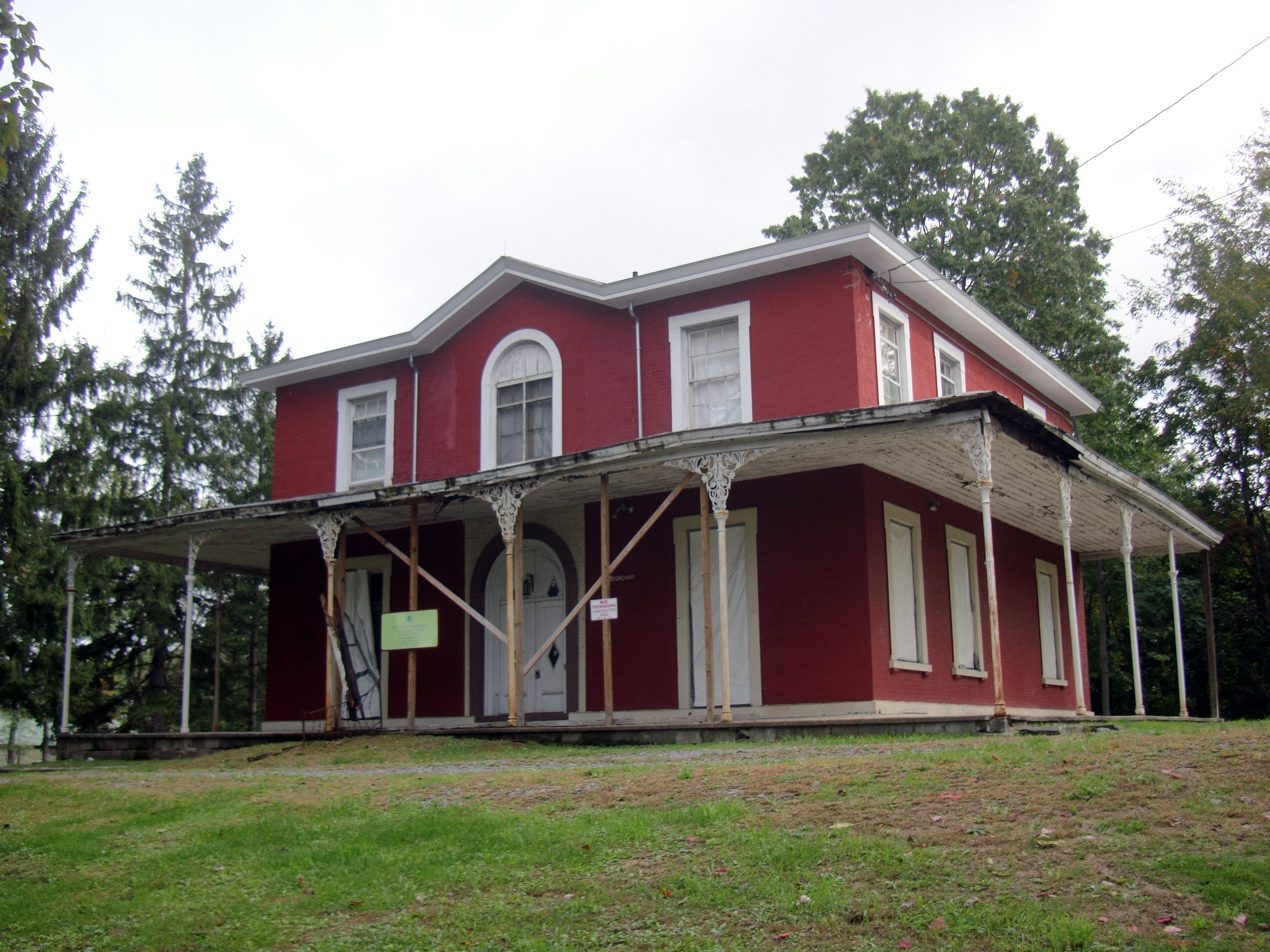

- Location within New York Location within the United States
- Location: 7260 South Broadway, Red Hook, New York
- Coordinates: 41°58′51″N 73°52′57″W
- Area: less than one acre
- Built: 1852-1853
- Architectural style: Italian Villa
- NRHP reference No.: 06000883
- Added to NRHP: September 28, 2006

St. Margaret's Home, also known as Mrs. Astor's Orphan Asylum, is a historic Episcopal orphanage located at 7260 South Broadway in Red Hook, Dutchess County, New York. It was built in 1852, and is a two-story, Italian Villa style brick building with brownstone trim. It features a front porch with fluted cast iron columns, French windows, and round arched center double entrance. Its construction and operation until 1872 was supported by Margaret Rebecca Armstrong Astor (1800-1872), wife of William Backhouse Astor, Sr. (1792-1875) From 1872 to 1875, its patron was Margaret Astor Ward Chanler, wife of John Winthrop Chanler (1826-1877), after which Congressman Chanler until his death in 1877 and afterwards the Chanler Estate. The orphanage closed in 1932.

It was added to the National Register of Historic Places in 2006.
