= James Armstrong (Pennsylvania politician) =

American politician

Member of the U.S. House of Representatives from Pennsylvania's at-large district
- In office March 4, 1793 – March 3, 1795
- Preceded by: None
- Succeeded by: None

Personal details
- Born: August 29, 1748 Carlisle, Province of Pennsylvania, British America
- Died: May 6, 1828 (aged 79) Carlisle, Pennsylvania, U.S.
- Party: Pro-Administration
- Spouse: Mary Stevenson (m. 1789; died 1813)
- Relations: John Armstrong Jr. (brother)
- Children: 9
- Parent: John Armstrong Sr.
- Education: Philadelphia Academy; Nassau Hall
- Alma mater: University of Pennsylvania

James Armstrong (August 29, 1748 – May 6, 1828) was an American judge, politician, medical doctor, and slave owner.

== Early life ==
Armstrong was born in Carlisle, Pennsylvania, on August 29, 1748. He was a son of Brigadier General and Continental Congressman John Armstrong and Rebecca (née Lyon) Armstrong (1719–1797). His older sister Rebecca Armstrong was the wife of James Turner and his younger brother was John Armstrong Jr., who became the U.S. Secretary of War and served as the Minister to France and a U.S. Senator from New York.

He was educated at the Philadelphia Academy and at Nassau Hall (later the College of New Jersey, and today known as Princeton University). He studied medicine at Dr. John Morgan's School in Philadelphia before graduating from the University of Pennsylvania in 1769.

== Career ==
After his graduation from medical school, he moved to Winchester in Frederick County, Virginia, where he established a medical practice.

During the American Revolutionary War, he served as a medical officer and is sometimes confused with several other James Armstrongs in the war. After the war, he spent three years in England to further his medical studies before returning to Carlisle in 1788. After Carlisle, he relocated to Mifflin County, Pennsylvania, where for twelve years he practiced medicine and was appointed as an associate Judge.

In 1792, he was elected as a Pro-Administration candidate to represent Pennsylvania in the United States House of Representatives from 1793 until 1795, serving in the 3rd U.S. Congress. After his single term in Congress, he returned to Carlisle in 1796 and continued practicing medicine. In 1796, he was elected a trustee of Dickinson College.

On September 12, 1808, he was appointed an associate judge of the Cumberland County Court.

== Personal life ==
In 1789, Armstrong was married to Mary Stevenson (1766–1813), a daughter of large land-owner and iron manufacturer George Stevenson, Esq. (formerly the deputy surveyor-general under Nicholas Scull for the "territories of Pennsylvania") and sister of Dr. George Stevenson, who served with distinction at the Battle of Brandywine. Together, they were the parents of nine children, including:

- John Wilkins Armstrong (1798–1870), a doctor who married Mary Susanna Shell (1813–1855) in 1825.
- Alfred Armstrong (1801–1884), who was thrice married—first to Mary, daughter of John Rankin, in 1829, second to Ann, daughter of Esq. Thomas Carothers, in 1838, and third to Mary, daughter of William Hamill, in 1863.

Armstrong died on May 6, 1828, in Carlisle and was buried in the Old Carlisle Cemetery.

He was the uncle of Mrs. William Backhouse Astor Sr.

=== Descendants ===
Through his son John, he was a grandfather of Mary Armstrong (1828–1898), wife of Christian Bowers Herman, and Cassius M. Armstrong (1846–1896), who married Jennie Hershman.

U.S. House of Representatives
Preceded by None	Member of the U.S. House of Representatives from Pennsylvania's at-large congressional district 1793–1795	Succeeded by None
