= The Astor Orphan =

Memoir by Alexandra Aldrich

- First edition
- Authors: Alexandra Aldrich
- Language: English
- Publisher: HarperCollins
- Publication date: 2013

The Astor Orphan is a 2013 memoir by Alexandra Aldrich, a member of the Astor family.

== Summary ==
Alexandra Aldrich, a direct descendant (5th great-granddaughter) of John Jacob Astor, recounts her childhood at Rokeby, a 43-room historic estate in Barrytown, New York. The family is land-rich but cash-poor. Her father is unemployed, and her grandmother is an alcoholic. The book ends as she leaves for boarding school.

== Critical reception ==
Publishers Weekly described the book as a "sparklingly mischievous debut".

In the Chicago Tribune, Kevin Nance compared it to Grey Gardens, adding that, "Aldrich delivers buckets of eccentricity." However, he argued that her "petulant grievance and thwarted entitlement" made the book "wearisome fast". He added that the dialogues lacked credibility, and that there is a "lack of an adult, emotionally mature perspective".

Writing for The New York Observer, Matthew Kassel argued that it "read[s] like a cross between Jane Eyre and Running with Scissors, adding that "it contain[ed] more than a few unsavory details about her family, personal things that one might not want the public to know about." He went on to say that "the book feels like a child's revenge on her family."

In Salon, Laura Miller called it "a mournful, curious tale of an anxious child's longing for security." She added that it lacked "the fluency of truly accomplished storytelling, but the story it tells is so extraordinary, and Aldrich's tone is so baldly honest, that the reader's attention will not flag.".

In The Boston Globe, Buzzy Jackson, the author of Shaking the Family Tree: Blue Bloods, Black Sheep, and Other Obsessions of an Accidental Genealogist, argued that it was "unpleasant for the reader to spend time with these spoiled, deranged people."

In the Star Tribune, Eric Hanson called the book, "wearying, gorgeous, ugly, sad, bohemian and only mildly sordid or scandalous by TV or literary standards."

The Kirkus Reviews said, "It’s a trick to tell a story this rich and complicated through the eyes of a child without losing the subtleties of character and nuances of history, but Aldrich pulls it off with aplomb."
