= John Armstrong Jr. =

American politician (1758–1843)

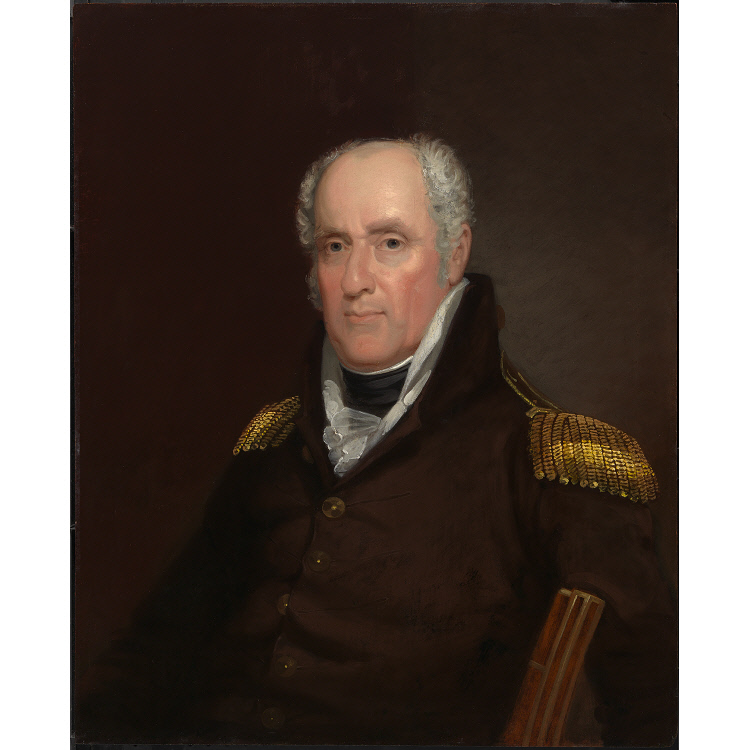
- Portrait by John Wesley Jarvis, c. 1807–1817

7th United States Secretary of War
- In office January 13, 1813 – September 27, 1814
- President: James Madison
- Preceded by: William Eustis
- Succeeded by: James Monroe

8th United States Minister to France
- In office November 18, 1804 – September 14, 1810
- President: Thomas Jefferson; James Madison
- Preceded by: Robert Livingston
- Succeeded by: Jonathan Russell

United States Senator from New York
- In office February 4, 1804 – June 30, 1804
- Preceded by: Theodorus Bailey
- Succeeded by: Samuel L. Mitchill
- In office November 10, 1803 – February 4, 1804
- Appointed by: George Clinton
- Preceded by: DeWitt Clinton
- Succeeded by: John Smith
- In office November 6, 1800 – February 5, 1802
- Preceded by: John Laurance
- Succeeded by: DeWitt Clinton

Member of the Continental Congress from Pennsylvania
- In office 1787–1788

Personal details
- Born: November 25, 1758 Carlisle, Pennsylvania. British America
- Died: April 1, 1843 (aged 84) Red Hook, New York, U.S.
- Party: Democratic-Republican
- Spouse: Alida Livingston (m. 1789; died 1822)
- Children: 7
- Relatives: John Armstrong (father); James Armstrong (brother)
- Education: Princeton University

Military service
- Allegiance: United States
- Branch/service: Continental Army; United States Army
- Years of service: 1775–1777, 1782–1783 (Continental Army); 1812–1813 (U.S. Army)
- Rank: Major (Continental Army); Brigadier General (U.S. Army)
- Battles/wars: American Revolutionary War; Battle of Princeton; Battles of Saratoga; War of 1812; Burning of Washington

John Armstrong Jr. (November 25, 1758 – April 1, 1843) was an American soldier, diplomat and statesman who was a delegate to the Continental Congress, U.S. Senator from New York, and United States Secretary of War under President James Madison. A member of the Democratic-Republican Party, Armstrong was United States Minister to France from 1804 to 1810. He was central to drawing up the Saint Lawrence Campaign plan during the War of 1812, whereby the USA would invade Canada in late 1813 and attempt to annex Montreal, a campaign which ended in abject failure for the Americans.

== Early life ==
Armstrong was born in Carlisle, Pennsylvania, the younger son of General John Armstrong Sr. and Rebecca (Lyon) Armstrong. John Sr. was a renowned Pennsylvania soldier born in Ireland of Scottish descent. John Jr.'s older brother was James Armstrong, who became a physician and U.S. Congressman.

After early education in Carlisle, John Jr. studied at the College of New Jersey, now Princeton University. He broke off his studies in Princeton in 1775 to return to Pennsylvania and join the fight in the Revolutionary War.

== Career ==
=== Revolutionary War ===
The young Armstrong initially joined a Pennsylvania militia regiment and the following year he was appointed as aide-de-camp to General Hugh Mercer of the Continental Army. In this role, he carried the wounded and dying General Mercer from the field at the Battle of Princeton. After the general died on January 12, 1777, Armstrong became an aide to General Horatio Gates. He stayed with Gates through the Battle of Saratoga then resigned due to problems with his health. In 1782 Gates asked him to return. Armstrong joined General Gates' staff as an aide with the rank of major, which he held through the rest of the war.

=== Newburgh letters ===
While in camp with Gates at Newburgh, New York, Armstrong became involved in the Newburgh Conspiracy. He is generally acknowledged as the author of the two anonymous letters directed at the officers in the camp. The first, titled "An Address to the Officers" (dated March 10, 1783), called for a meeting to discuss back pay and other grievances with the Congress and form a plan of action. After George Washington ordered the meeting canceled and called for a milder meeting on March 15, a second address appeared that claimed that this showed that Washington supported their actions.

Washington successfully defused this protest without a mutiny. While some of Armstrong's later correspondence acknowledged his role, there was never any official action that connected him with the anonymous letters.

=== After the revolution ===
Later in 1783 Armstrong returned home to Carlisle and became an Original Member of the Pennsylvania Society of the Cincinnati. He was named the Adjutant General of Pennsylvania's militia and also served as Secretary of the Commonwealth of Pennsylvania under Presidents Dickinson and Franklin. In 1784, he led a military force of four hundred militiamen into a controversy with Connecticut settlers in the Wyoming Valley of Pennsylvania. His tactics enraged the nearby states of Vermont and Connecticut, which sent their own militia into the area. Timothy Pickering was dispatched to forge a solution to the difficulty, and the settlers were able to keep title to the land they had tamed. In 1787 and 1788 Armstrong was sent as a delegate for Pennsylvania to the Congress of the Confederation. The Congress offered to make him chief justice of the Northwest Territory. He declined this, as well as all other public offices for the next dozen years.

Armstrong resumed public life after the resignation of John Laurance as U.S. Senator from New York. As a Jeffersonian Republican he was elected in November 1800 to a term ending in March 1801. He took his seat on November 6, and was re-elected on January 27 for a full term (1801–1807), but resigned on February 5, 1802. DeWitt Clinton was elected to fill the vacancy, but resigned in 1803, and Armstrong was appointed temporarily to his old seat.

In February 1804, Armstrong was elected again to the U.S. Senate to fill the vacancy caused by the resignation of Theodorus Bailey, thus moving from the Class 3 to the Class 1 seat on February 25, but served only four months before President Jefferson appointed him U.S. Minister to France.

To Paris Armstrong brought as his private secretary the United-Irish exile, David Bailie Warden. After serving as Consul, Warden was to author the first major work of reference for the diplomatic corps; a "pioneering" contribution to "the emergence of doctrinal views and a specialist literature on international law".

Armstrong served as Minister in Paris until September 1810. In 1806 he had also briefly also represented the United States at the court of Spain.

When the War of 1812 broke out, Armstrong was called to military service. He was commissioned as a Brigadier General, and placed in charge of the defenses for the port of New York. Then in 1813 President Madison named him Secretary of War. He was barely confirmed by the Senate on a vote of 18-15.

Henry Adams wrote of him:

In spite of Armstrong's services, abilities, and experience, something in his character always created distrust. He had every advantage of education, social and political connection, ability and self-confidence; he was only fifty-four years old, which was also the age of Monroe; but he suffered from the reputation of indolence and intrigue. So strong was the prejudice against him that he obtained only eighteen votes against fifteen in the Senate on his confirmation; and while the two senators from Virginia did not vote at all, the two from Kentucky voted in the negative. Under such circumstances, nothing but military success of the first order could secure a fair field for Monroe's rival.

Armstrong made a number of valuable changes to the armed forces but was so convinced that the British would not attack Washington D.C. that he did nothing to defend the city even when it became clear it was the objective of the invasion force. After the American defeat at the Battle of Bladensburg and the subsequent burning of Washington, Madison, usually a forgiving man, forced him to resign in September 1814.

=== Later life ===
Armstrong returned to his farm and resumed a quiet life. He published a number of histories, biographies, and some works on agriculture. He died at La Bergerie (later renamed Rokeby), the farm estate he built in Red Hook, New York in 1843 and is buried in the cemetery in Rhinebeck. Following the death of Paine Wingate in 1838, he became the last surviving delegate to the Continental Congress, and the only one to be photographed.

== Personal life ==
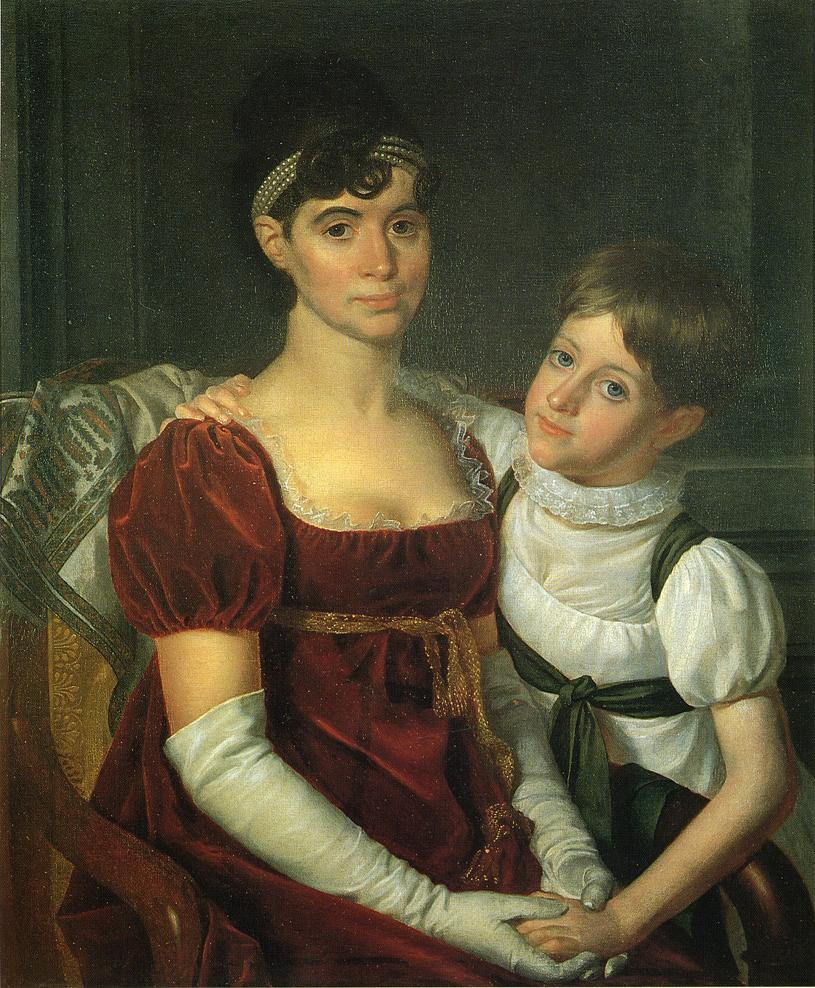
Alida Livingston Armstrong and Daughter, Rembrandt Peale, ca. 1810

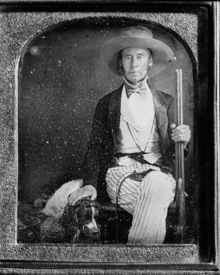
Daguerreotype of Armstrong in 1840. This photo is the only one of a person who served as a delegate to the Continental Congress.

In 1789, Armstrong married Alida Livingston (1761–1822), the youngest child of Judge Robert Livingston (1718–1775) and Margaret (née Beekman) Livingston. Alida was also the sister of Chancellor Robert R. Livingston and Edward Livingston. Together they had seven children:

- Maj Horatio Gates Armstrong (1790–1858), soldier in the War of 1812.
- Henry Beekman Armstrong (1791–1854), also a soldier in the War of 1812.
- John Armstrong (1794–1852), who moved to New York and took up life as a gentleman farmer at La Bergerie, a farm purchased from Alida's family in Dutchess County
- Robert Livingston Armstrong (1797–1834)
- Margaret Rebecca Armstrong (1800–1872), who married William Backhouse Astor Sr. (1792–1875) of the prominent Astor family.
- James Kosciuszko Armstrong (1801–1868)
- William Armstrong (1814–1902), who married Lucy A. Hickernell (1816–1894).

Armstrong died in Red Hook, New York on April 1, 1843. He was buried at the Rhinebeck Cemetery in Rhinebeck, New York.

=== Residences ===
==== Almont ====
Armstrong's initial farm in Dutchess County, called "Altmont" (also known as "The Meadows"), was originally part of the Schuyler patent. In 1795, he purchased a part of the farm from the Van Benthuysen family, and converted an existing barn into a two-story Federal style dwelling with twelve rooms. Around 1800, Armstrong sold "Almont" to Andrew and Anna Verplanck Deveaux. Deveaux died in 1812; in 1816 his widow sold "Deveaux Park" to John Stevens. The mansion burned down around 1879. In 1908, lumber rights to the white oak and chestnut forests were sold for timber for the New York market.

==== La Bergerie ====
After the death of Margaret Beekman Livingston, widow of Judge Robert Livingston, much of the Clermont land was distributed among the heirs. John R. Livingston received the land that would become the "Messena" estate. His sister Alida Livingston Armstrong inherited the property just to the south. There the Armstrong's created "La Bergerie", in English "the sheepfold" – an estate where they raised Merino sheep. The Merino sheep were a gift from the French Emperor Napoleon Bonaparte on Armstrong's departure after being Minister. The Astors purchased it for a summer home and renamed it Rokeby. Margaret Chanler Aldrich, great-granddaughter of Margaret Armstrong Astor, married Richard Aldrich. Rokeby remains in the Aldrich family.

== See also ==
- Rokeby (Barrytown, New York)

U.S. Senate
Preceded by John Laurance	U.S. senator (Class 3) from New York; 1800–1802; Served alongside: Gouverneur Morris	Succeeded by DeWitt Clinton
Preceded by DeWitt Clinton	U.S. senator (Class 3) from New York; 1803–1804; Served alongside: Theodorus Bailey	Succeeded by John Smith
Preceded by Theodorus Bailey	U.S. senator (Class 1) from New York; 1804; Served alongside: John Smith	Succeeded by Samuel Mitchill
Diplomatic posts
Preceded by Robert R. Livingston	U.S. Minister to France; 1804–1810	Succeeded by Joel Barlow
Political offices
Preceded by William Eustis	U.S. Secretary of War; Served under: James Madison; 1813–1814	Succeeded by James Monroe
