= Sophie von Hellermann =

- Born: 1975 (age 50–51); Munich, West Germany
- Education: Royal College of Art

Sophie von Hellermann (born 1975, Munich) is an artist based in London who gained a fine art degree at the Royal College of Art. She went to art school in London, and stayed because "It's magical." She has been inspired by German Romanticism and German Expressionism.

Von Hellermann has shown work internationally in exhibitions including "Dear Painter… Paint Me" at the Pompidou Centre in Paris, "On The Ground" at Vilma Gold in London, "Post Modern" at Greene Naftali in New York, and Margate, England. She was part of 2011's "Spring of September" annual exhibition in Toulouse.

She also had solo exhibits "Cold as a Witch's Tit" at Firstsite, Colchester (2013), and "Play With Fire" at Vilma Gold (2015). One of her pieces is in the permanent collection of the Tak Room at Hudson Yards as of 2019.

After the lockdown due to COVID-19, she was part of a re-opening exhibit in Berlin in May 2020.

In 2022, von Hellermann was commissioned by Oxford University's Jewish Country Houses Project and urKultur to create a site-specific artwork in Schloss Freienwalde, the former home of Walther Rathenau.
