= Rokeby (Barrytown, New York) =

- U.S. National Register of Historic Places
- U.S. Historic district
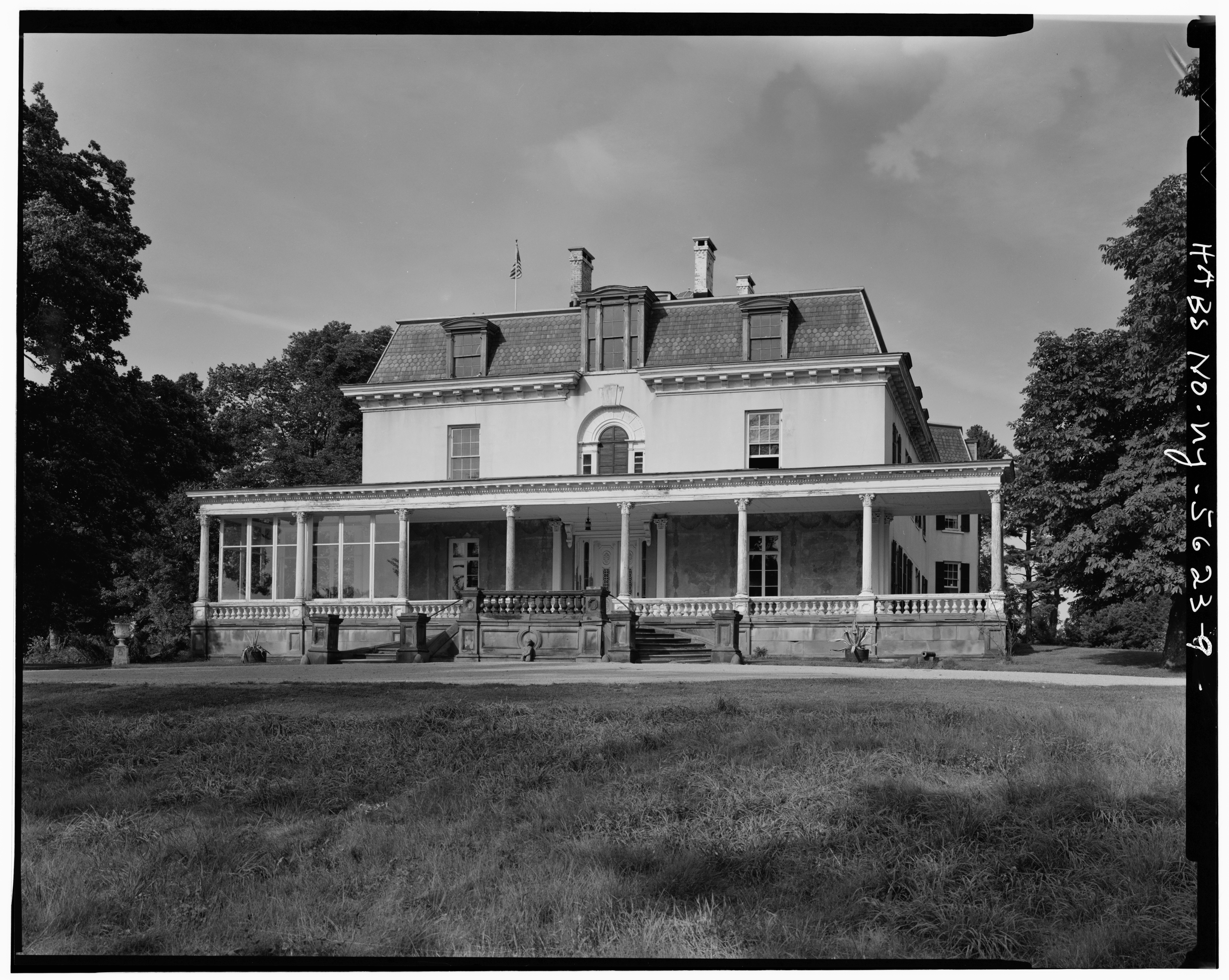
- Rokeby Estate Mansion, southeast front

- Location within New York Location within the United States
- Location: S of Barrytown between Hudson River and River Rd., Barrytown, New York
- Coordinates: 41°59′16″N 73°55′28″W
- Area: 437 acres (177 ha)
- Built: 1811–1815
- Architectural style: Second Empire
- NRHP reference No.: 75001181
- Added to NRHP: March 26, 1975

Rokeby, also known as La Bergerie, is a historic estate and federally recognized historic district located at Barrytown in Dutchess County, New York, United States. It includes seven contributing buildings and one contributing structure.

== History ==
The original section of the main house was built 1811–1815. Construction was interrupted by the War of 1812 when John Armstrong Jr. (1758-1843), the owner, served as a Brigadier General, Minister to France, and later as US Secretary of War under James Madison. When the British burned Washington DC in 1814, Armstrong received much of the blame, as he had previously insisted that the British would not attack Washington and failed to properly provide for the defense of the city; he consequently retired to finish building his estate on the Hudson River in 1815. The Armstrongs originally called their home "La Bergerie," French for "the sheepfold," as they were raising a large herd of Merino sheep which had been a gift from Napoleon Bonaparte.

In 1818, Armstrong's daughter, Margaret Rebecca, married William Backhouse Astor, Sr. (1795–1875), son and main heir of John Jacob Astor. In 1836, William Astor purchased the 728-acre estate from his father-in-law for $50,000. The portion of the property containing the Mudder Kill is said to have reminded Margaret Astor of the glen in Sir Walter Scott's epic poem, Rokeby, and she changed the estate's name from "La Bergerie" to "Rokeby."

== Description ==
Evidence suggests that the overall plan was designed by John Armstrong himself. It started as a rectangular, 2-story structure with a hipped roof topped by a square, pyramidal-roofed cupola. The house had a three-bay front facade with five-bay side elevations in the Federal style. There is a central entrance and interior hall which opens into three rooms on each side, and a curved staircase was located at the back of this hall. The staircase returned and entered a rectangular hall with a large skylight (known as a clerestory) on the second floor. The four front bedrooms were accessed from this hall. There was originally a second straight staircase that led from grade to an elaborate door with sidelights on the second floor which was open to the main hall. Due to later alterations, this feature is now completely enclosed. On the other side of the door, there is now a small vestibule, an arched passage, and a small flight of stairs descending to the main staircase. It features a Palladian window on the southeast face of the second story. A 1 1/2-story addition constructed of fieldstone was built about 1816.

In the mid-19th century, William Backhouse Astor enlarged the house from 20 rooms to 48, in brick with brownstone trim, with a semi-octagonal tower on the west side, a north wing, and a third floor throughout the building. Numerous additions were made between 1857–1858. These include the front columned veranda and brownstone Renaissance Revival staircase. The mansard roof, tower, and service wing were also additions from this period. The spectacular Gothic Revival library contained within the tower is reminiscent of the work of Alexander Jackson Davis. Architect and Chanler family friend Stanford White was hired to enlarge the west drawing room and to install the clerestory in 1895. A sun porch was added in the 1920s.

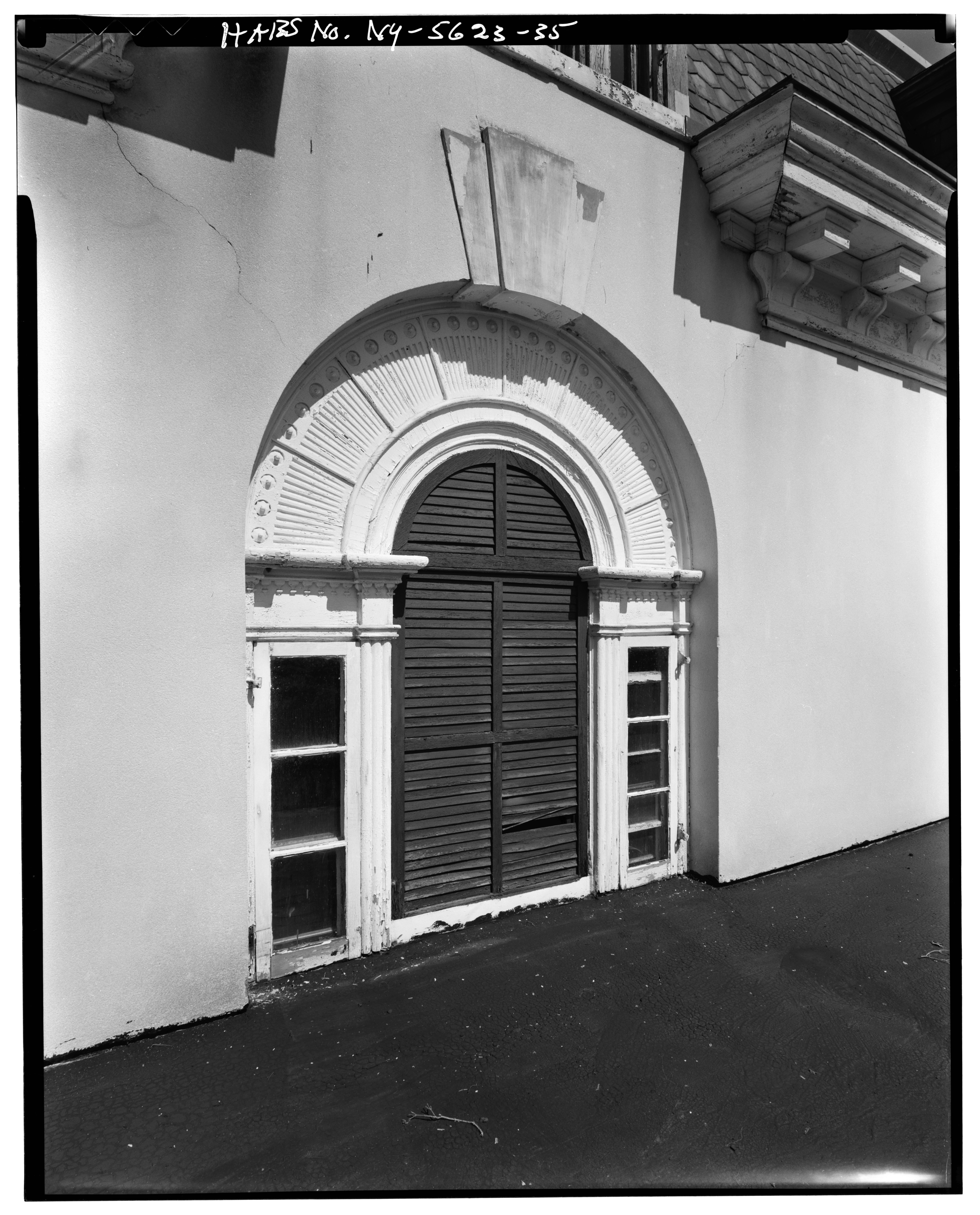
Palladian window, southeast facade.

The landscaping was improved about 1846 by Hans Jacob Ehlers, who removed a nearby hill to permit a view of the Hudson River. In 1911, the Olmsted Brothers enlarged the flower gardens and planted an apple orchard. The property also includes a pair of clapboarded wood-frame barns, additional stables (built about 1850 and destroyed by fire), greenhouse (converted to a garage in 1910, then to a residence in 1965), the square brick gardener's cottage, and a 1 1/2-story gatehouse. Additionally, there is a brick stable designed by McKim, Mead & White, and a private docking facility.

== Residents ==
John Armstrong Jr. lived at Rokeby following his retirement in 1814 until his death at home in 1843, and is buried in the cemetery in Rhinebeck. William and Rebecca Astor's daughter Emily married Samuel Cutler Ward, brother of Julia Ward Howe. Their daughter, Margaret Astor Ward (1838-1875) married John Winthrop Chanler (1826-1877).

The house was later home to the Astor Orphans, the children of John and Margaret, both of whom died of pneumonia. They left instructions that their ten children were to be raised at Rokeby. Most of them grew up to become well known in politics or the arts. John Winthrop Chanler's will provided $20,000 a year for each child for life (equivalent to $470,563 in 2018 dollars), enough to live comfortably by the standards of the time. They included:

- John Armstrong "Archie" Chanler (1862-1935), who married and later divorced novelist Amélie Louise Rives
- Winthrop Astor Chanler (1863-1926), who served in the Rough Riders in Cuba and was wounded at the Battle of Tayacoba
- Emily Astor Chanler (1864-1872), who died of scarlet fever
- Elizabeth Astor Winthrop Chanler (1866-1937), who married author John Jay Chapman
- William Astor Chanler (1867-1934), soldier, politician and explorer who married actress Minnie Ashley.
- Marion Ward Chanler (1868-1883), who died of pneumonia
- Lewis Stuyvesant Chanler (1869-1942), politician who married Julia Lynch Olin (1882–1961).
- Margaret Livingston Chanler (1870-1963), who served as a nurse with the American Red Cross during the Spanish–American War and who married Richard Aldrich (1863–1937)
- Robert Winthrop Chanler (1872-1930), artist who married and later divorced Natalina "Lina" Cavalieri (1874–1944)
- Alida Beekman Chanler (1873-1969) who married Christopher Temple Emmet.
- Egerton White Chanler (1874–1882), who died of a brain tumor

As the eldest son, John Armstrong Chanler inherited the property with all its stock, books, pictures, furniture, and personal property, on his twenty-first birthday in 1883, along with $100,000 (equivalent to $2,352,813 in 2018 dollars) for its maintenance, however after his marriage began to disintegrate, he moved to Roanoke Rapids, North Carolina. By agreement of the siblings, Margaret Livingston Chanler bought their shares in the estate during the 1890s. Her grandson Richard Aldrich inherited the estate upon her death in 1963. It is currently owned by the Aldrich family.

In 2013, former resident and Astor heiress Alexandra Aldrich (great-granddaughter of Margaret Livingston Chanler) published The Astor Orphan, a memoir set at Rokeby.

The house is currently the home to various artists and writers, including Processional Arts Workshop. It is also the site of the Shoving Leopard organic farm.

Ragnar Kjartansson's ''The Visitors'' (2012), an approximately hour-long video-performance, was filmed on location at Rokeby. Rokeby was the site of an earlier 2007 piece by Kjartansson, titled The Blossoming Trees Performance, during which he recorded himself as a plein air painter for two days. The estate has also been used by other artists, due to the unique interiors of the main house on the property.

== Heritage significance ==
It was added to the National Register of Historic Places in 1975.

== Gallery ==
Photos of La Bergerie by Mark Zeek, 1979.

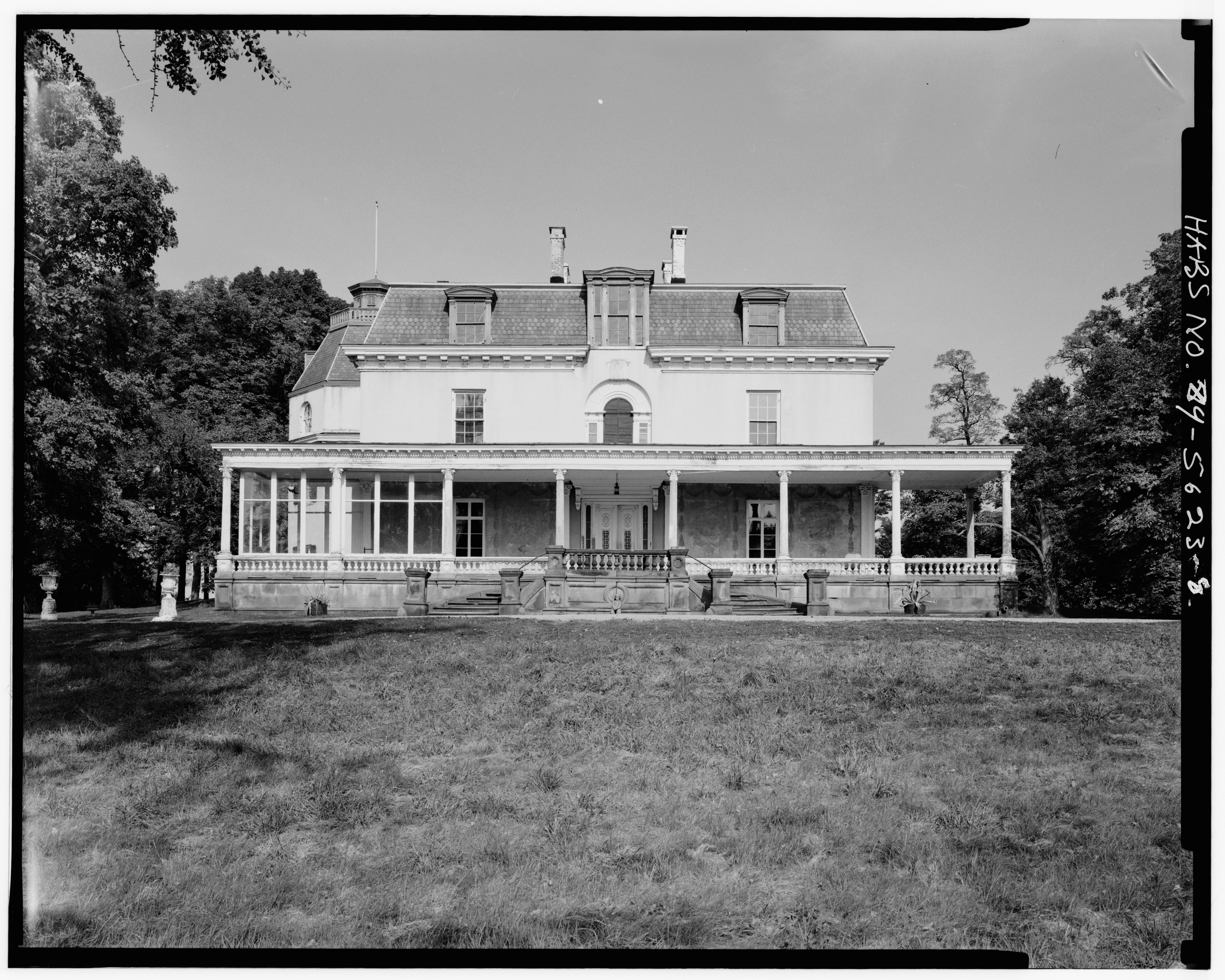
Front facade of the house, facing north

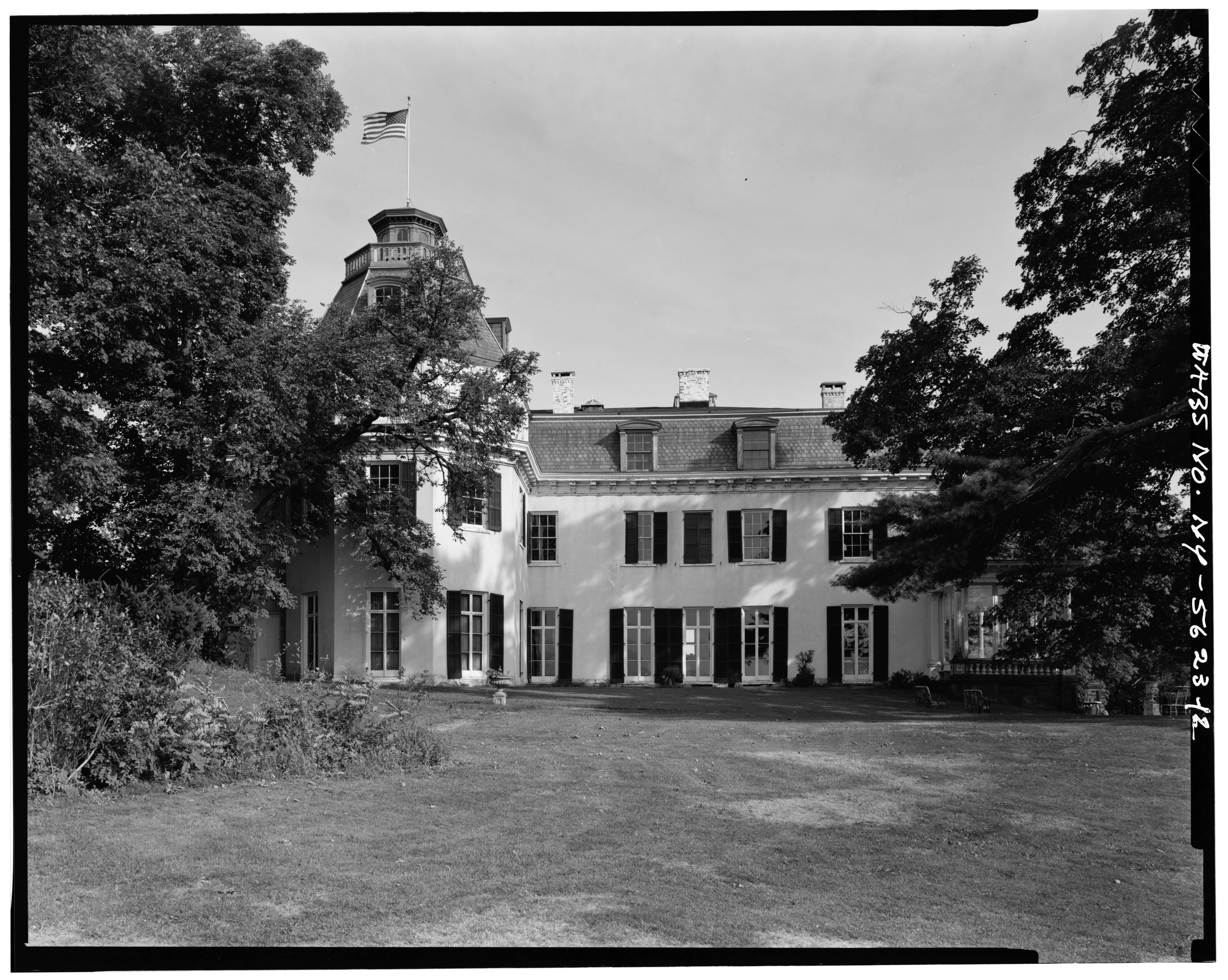
Northeast facade

The house received a library with tower, mansard roof and service wing in 1857–1858.

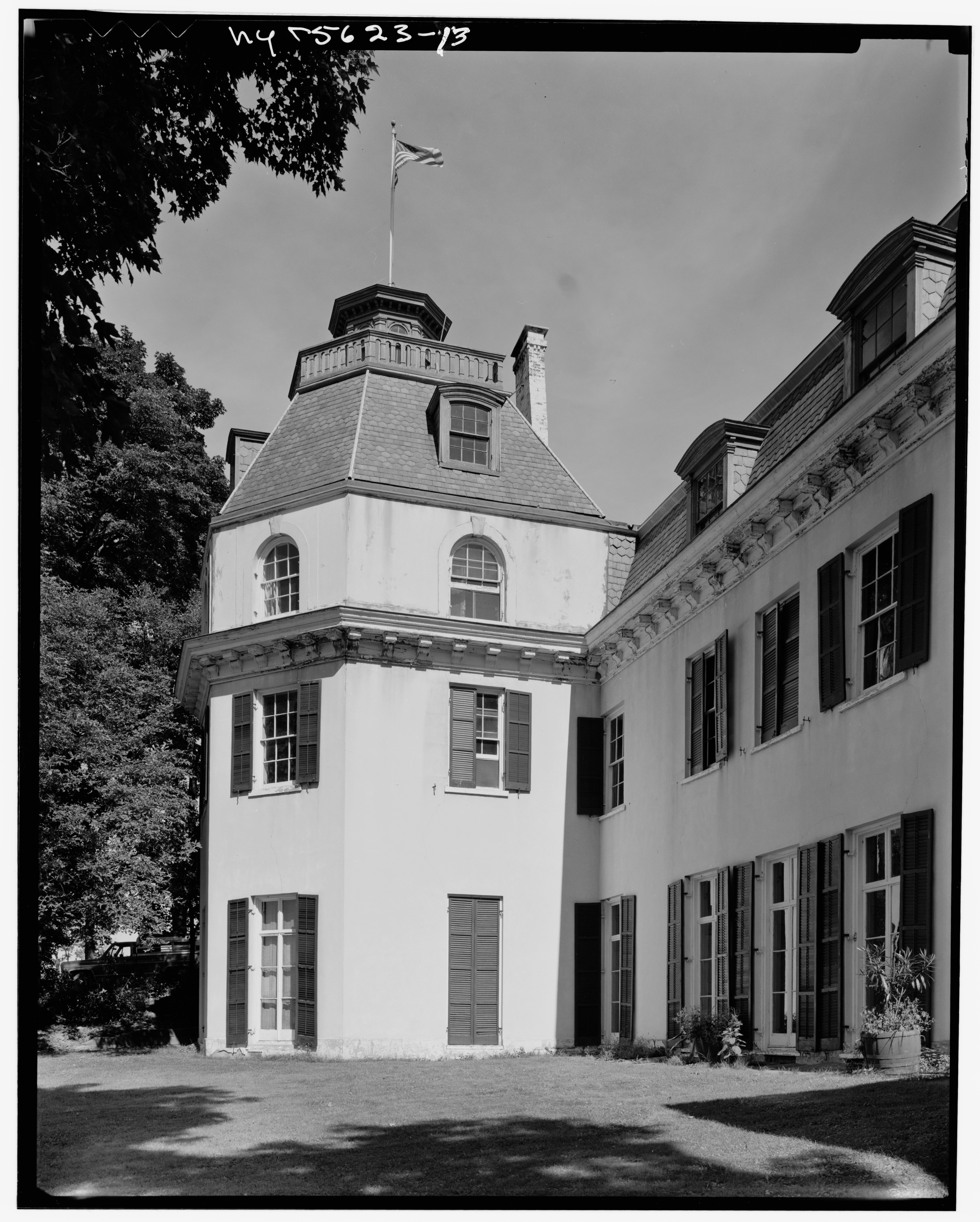
Library tower

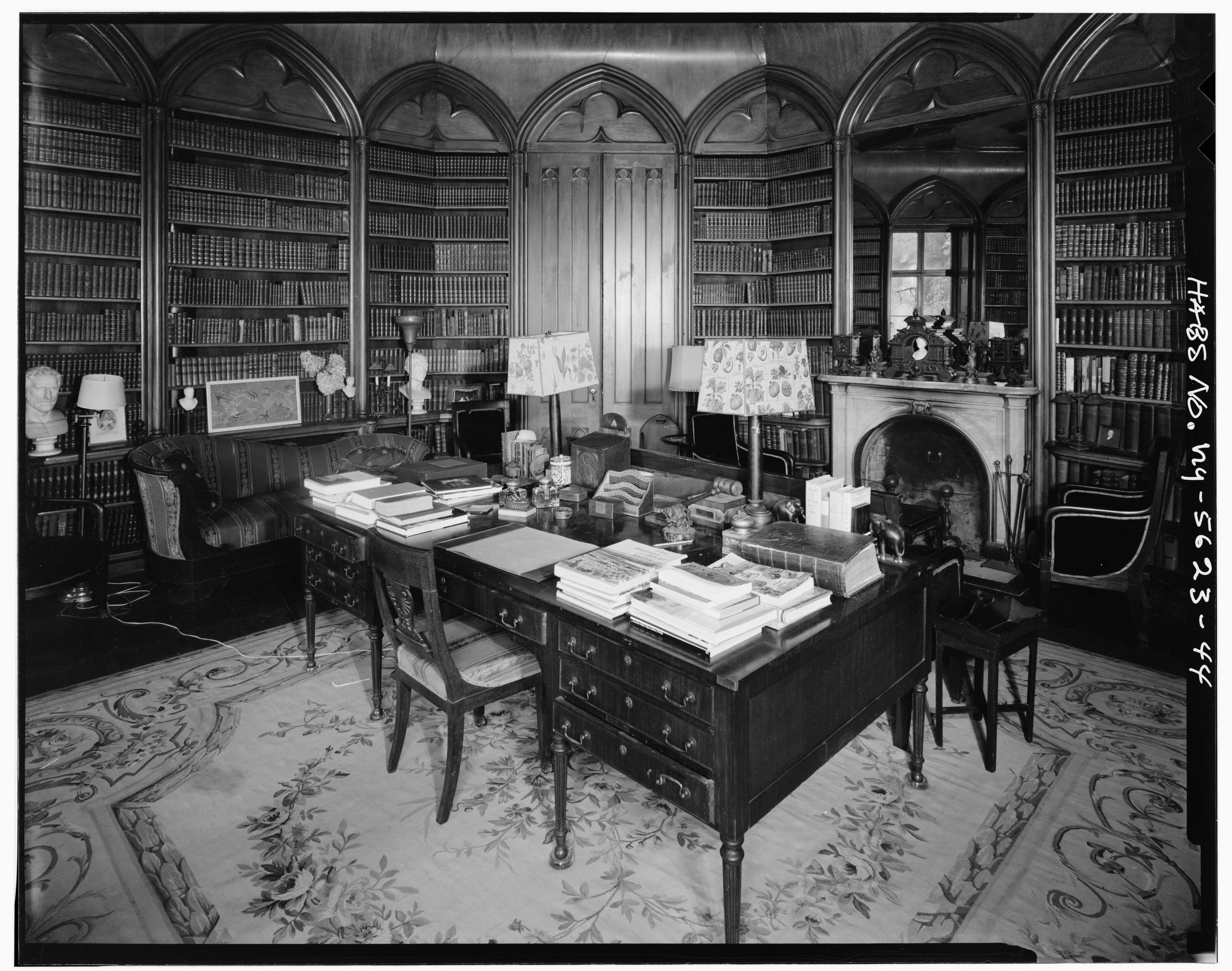
Library interior

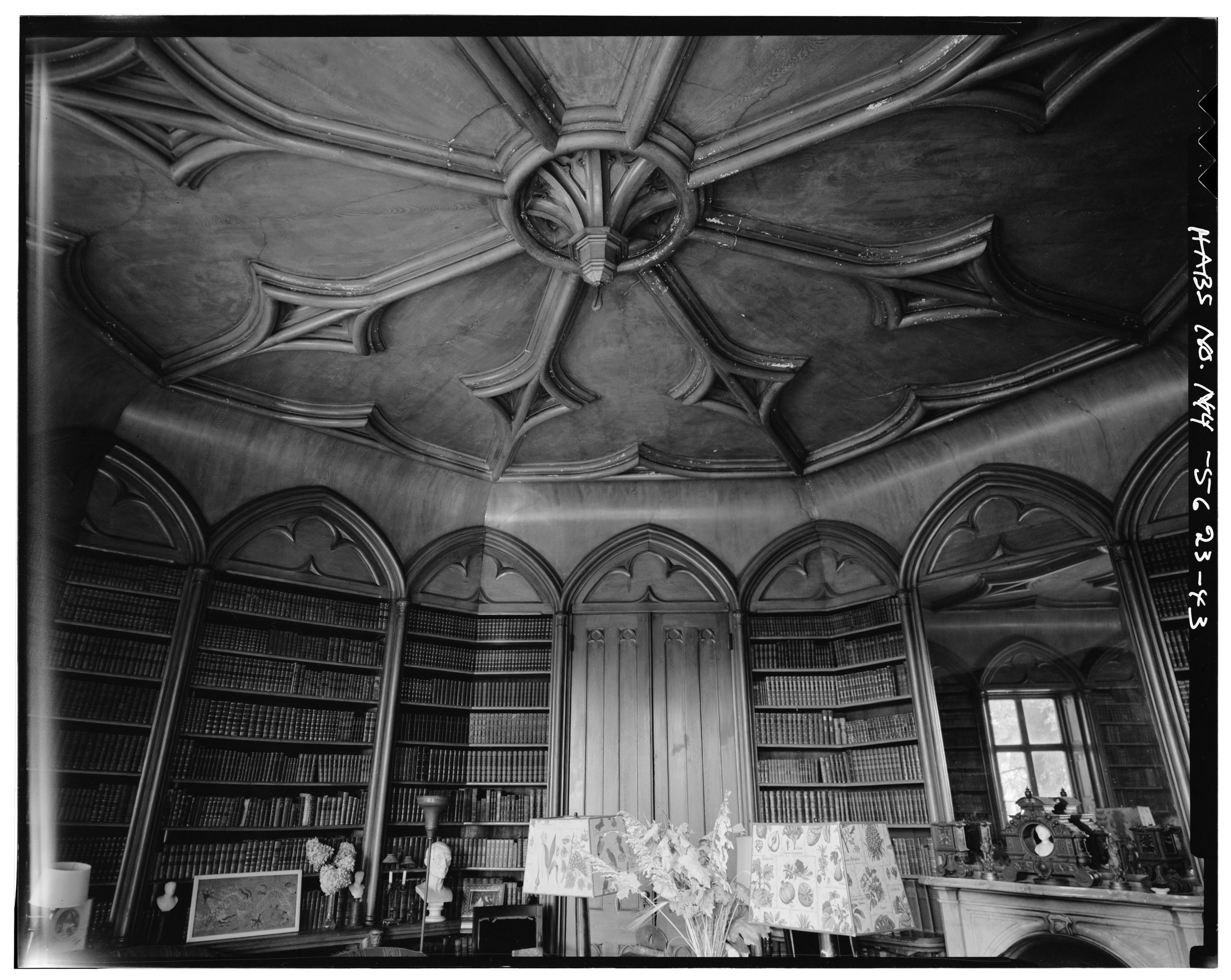
Library tower ceiling.

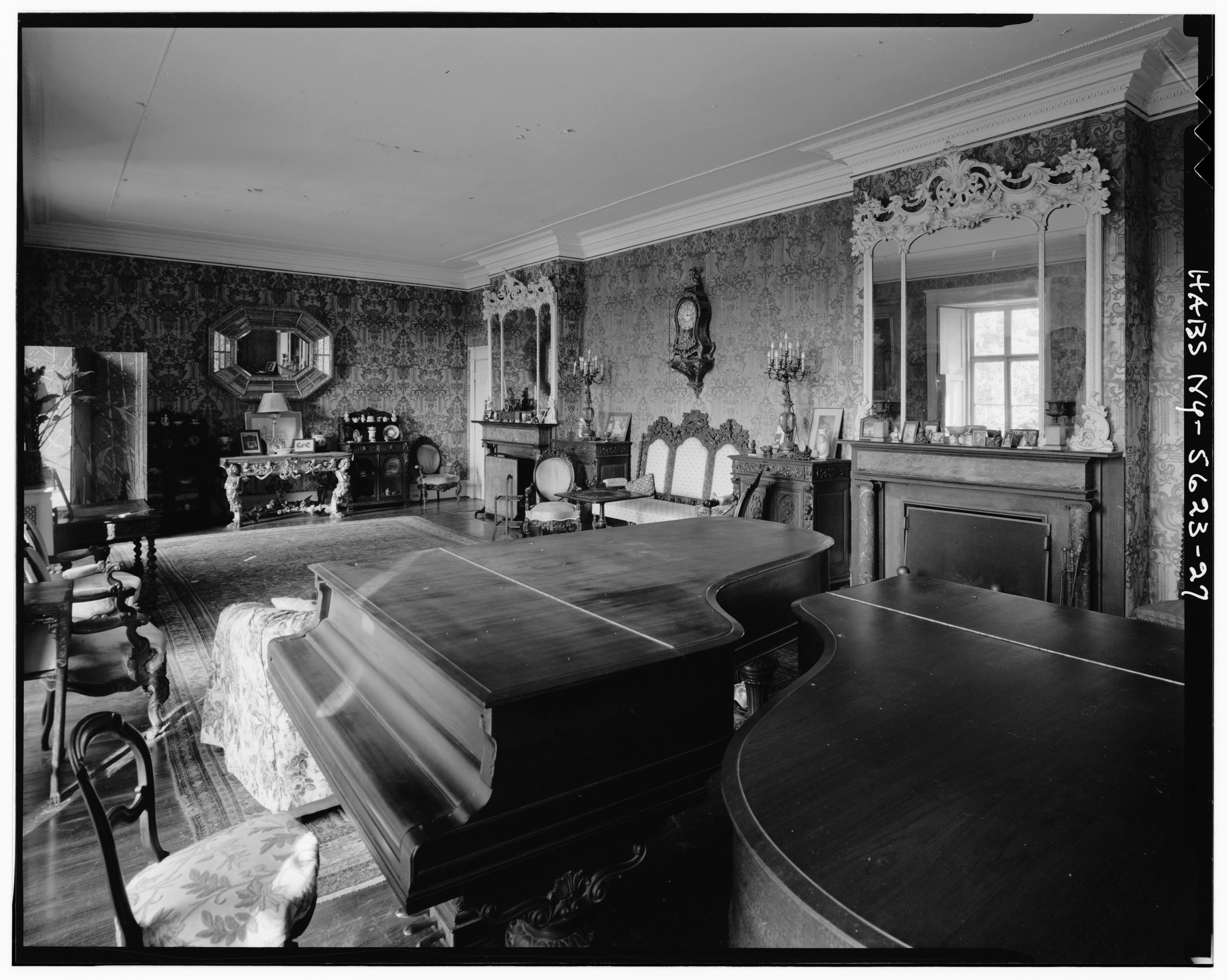
Drawing Room, northeast view.

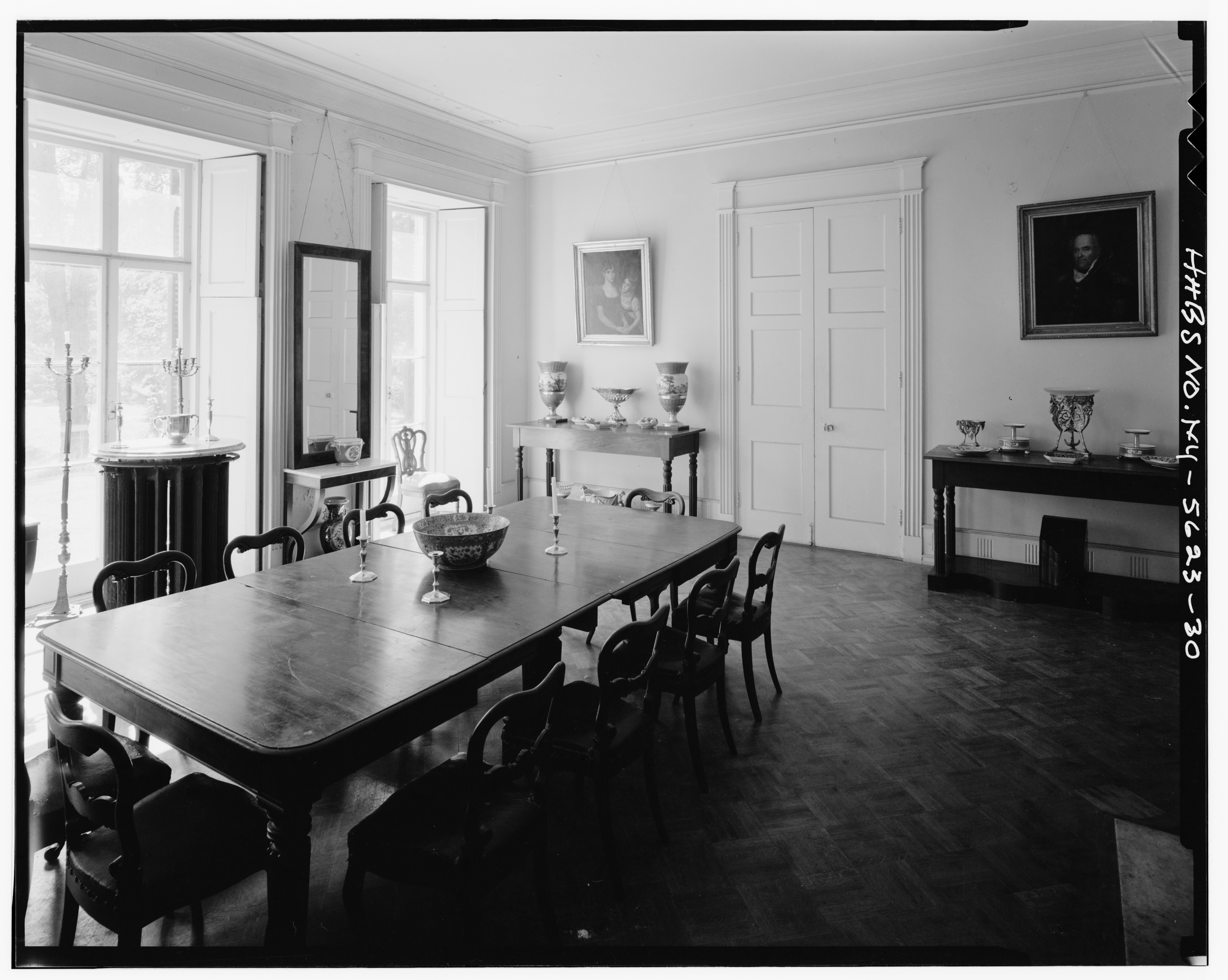
Dining Room, looking southeast.

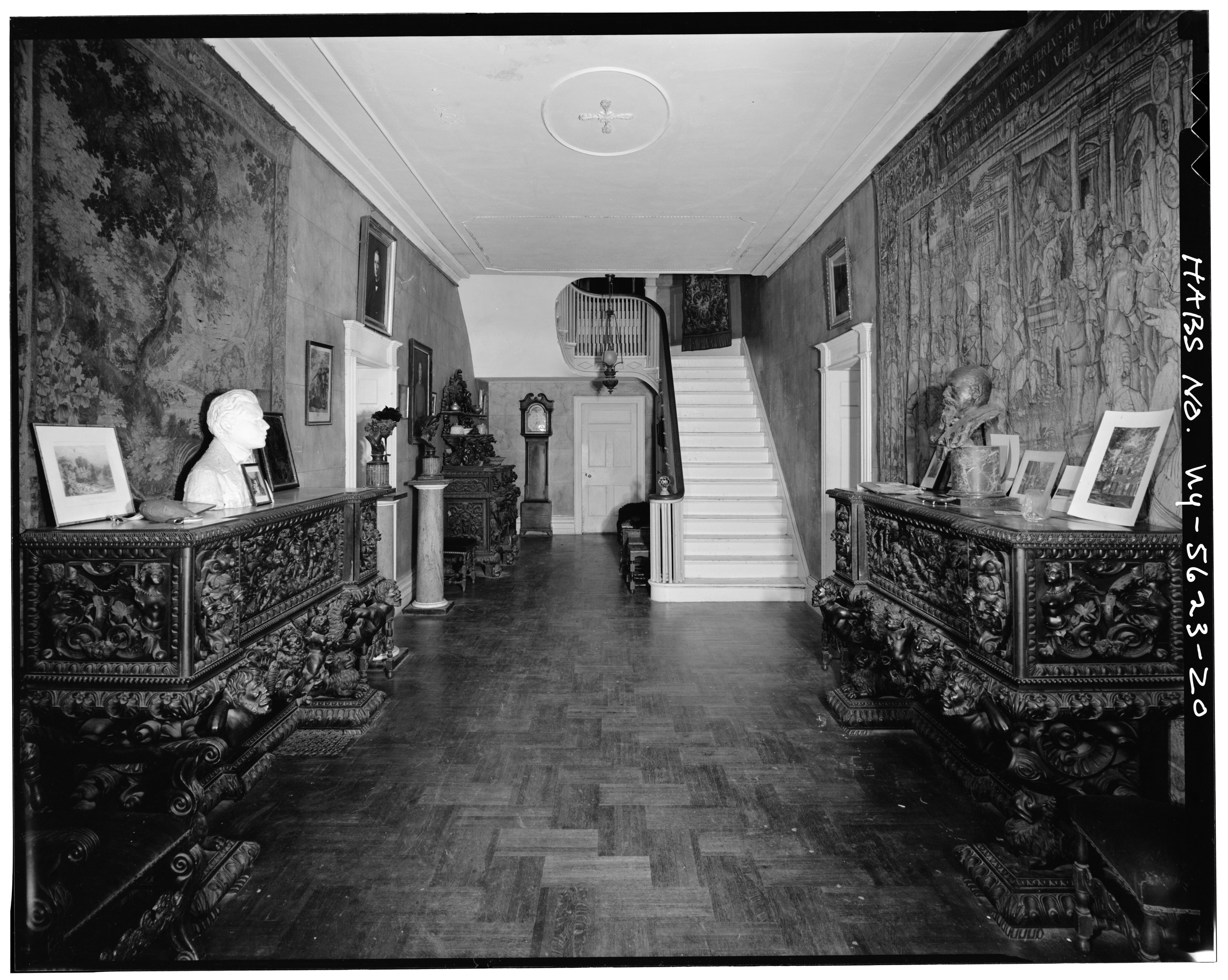
First floor stair hallway entrance.

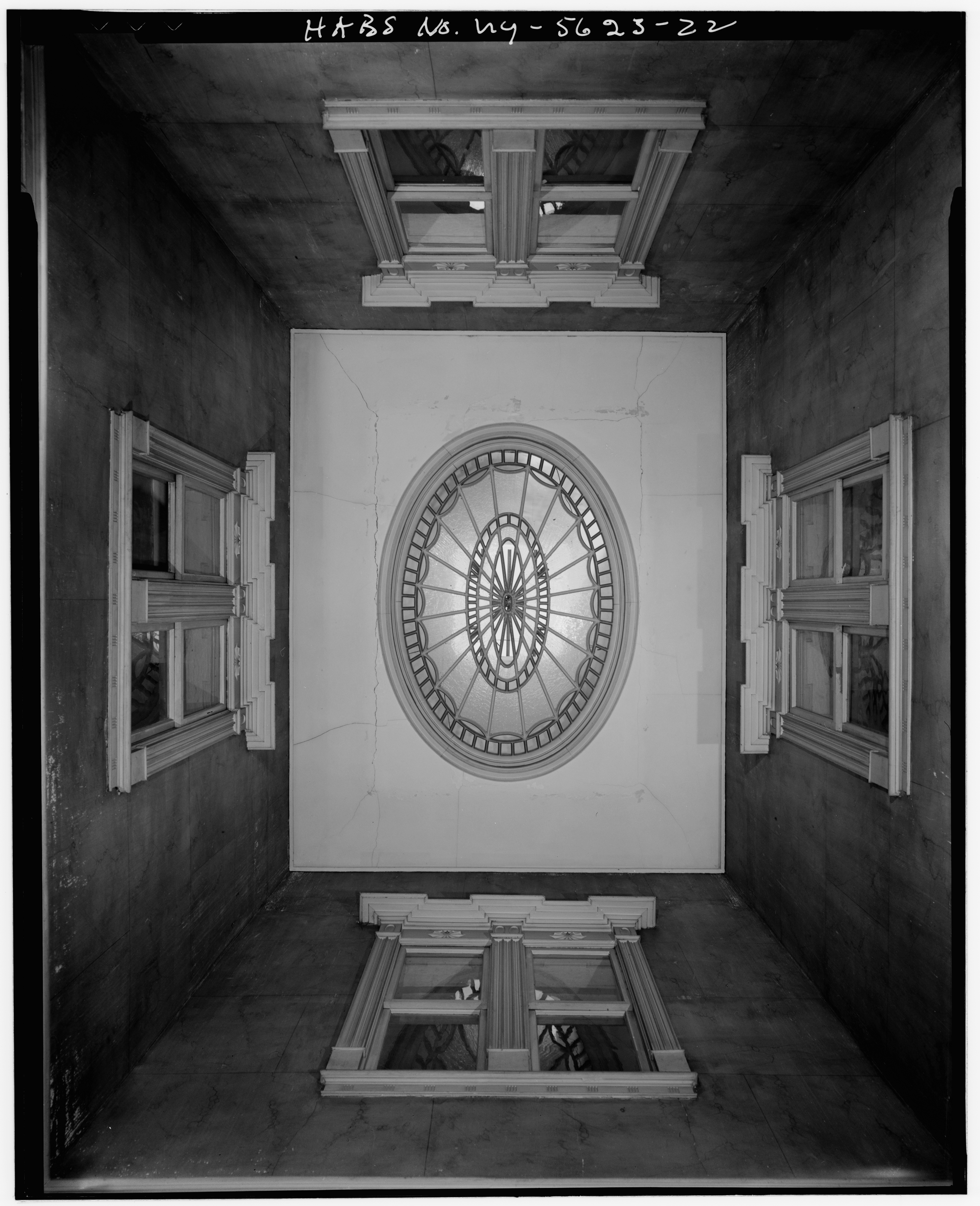
Clerestory over the second floor stairway

== See also ==
- Hudson River Historic District
- National Register of Historic Places listings in Dutchess County, New York
- Poets' Walk Park
