= William Backhouse Astor Sr. =

American businessman (1792–1875)

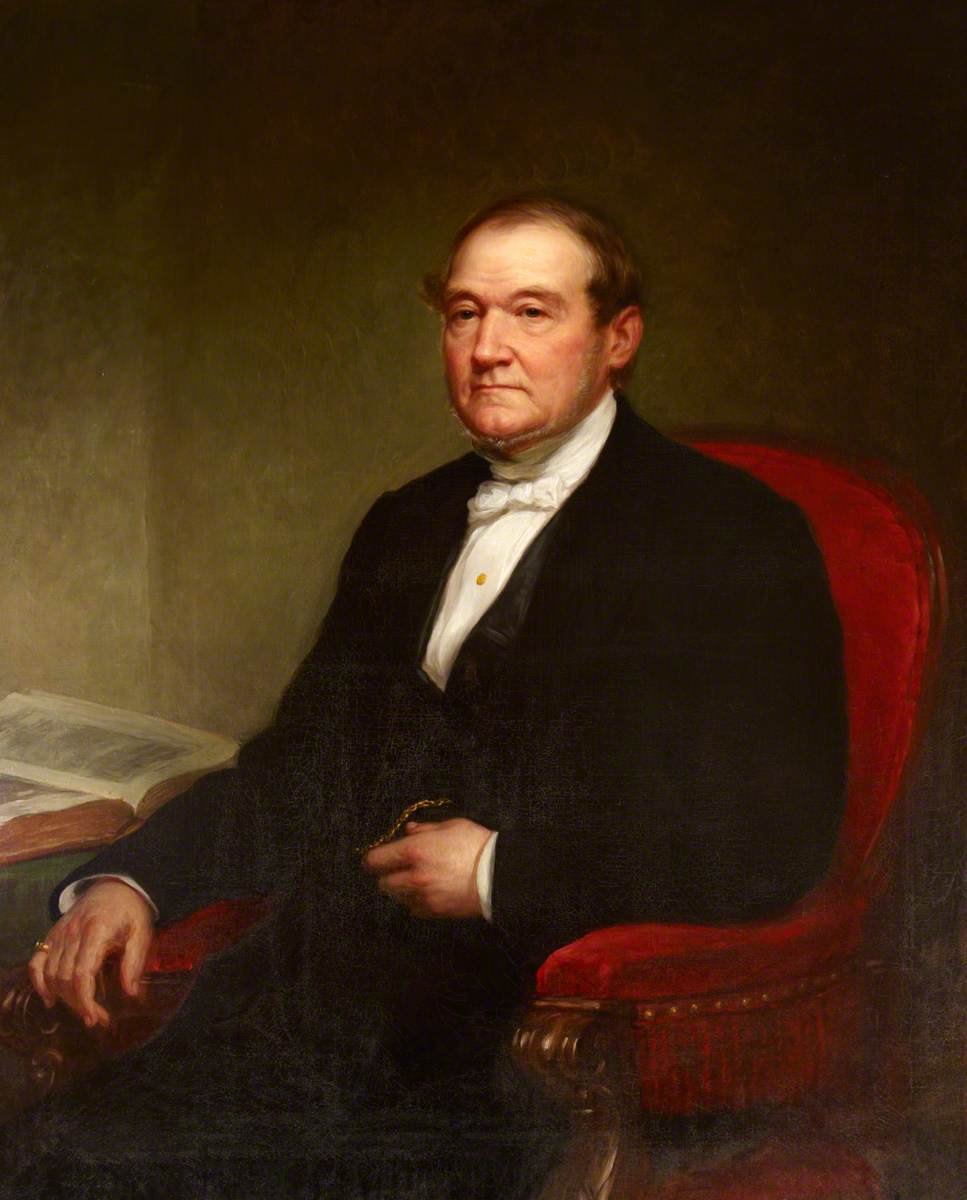
- Astor, c. 1850
- Born: William Backhouse Astor; September 19, 1792; New York City, U.S.
- Died: November 24, 1875 (aged 83); New York City, U.S.
- Burial place: Trinity Church Cemetery, New York City, U.S.
- Education: Columbia College; University of Göttingen; University of Heidelberg
- Spouse: Margaret Alida Rebecca Armstrong (m. 1818; died 1872)
- Children: 7, including John and William Jr.
- Parent(s): John Jacob Astor; Sarah Cox Todd
- Relatives: See Astor family

William Backhouse Astor Sr. (September 19, 1792 – November 24, 1875) was an American business magnate who inherited most of his father John Jacob Astor's fortune. He worked as a partner in his father's successful export business. His massive investment in Manhattan real estate enabled major donations to the Astor Library in the East Village, which became the New York Public Library.

== Early life ==
William was born in New York City on September 19, 1792, and named after William Backhouse, a friend of his father who was a New York merchant. He was a son of fur-trader John Jacob Astor (1763–1848) and Sarah Cox Todd (1761–1834). His seven siblings were Magdalena (1788–1832), Sarah (1790–1790), John Jr. (1791–1869), Dorothea (1795–1874), Henry (1797–1799), Eliza (1801–1838), and an unnamed brother who died shortly after his November 13, 1802, birth.

He attended local public schools. His spare hours and vacations were employed in assisting his father in the store. Official records show that he matriculated with the class of 1811 of Columbia College, but did not graduate from the institution. At Columbia, he was a member of the Peithologian Society and Philolexian Society, both undergraduate literary societies.

Instead, at age sixteen, he was sent to the University of Göttingen in Germany, where he joined the German Student Corps Curonia of the Baltic German students; later he moved to the University of Heidelberg. He chose as his tutor a student, afterward known as the Chevalier Christian Charles Josias von Bunsen, with whom he also traveled.

== Career ==
In 1815, he returned to the United States and entered partnership with his father, who changed the name of his firm to John Jacob Astor & Son and engaged in the China trade. William's elder brother John Jacob Astor Jr. was sickly and mentally unstable, and had no part in the business. He worked there until his father's death. One source argued that his role in the company was never anything more than as "an industrious and faithful head clerk", despite his official title of head of the firm's chief subsidiary, the American Fur Company, in its last several years of its ownership by Astor & Son.

Although William's fortunes grew with his father's company, he became a truly wealthy man when he inherited the estate, worth around $500,000 (equivalent to roughly $507 million in 2024), of his childless uncle Henry Astor I, who died in 1833. When John Jacob Astor Sr. died in 1848, William became the richest man in America.

=== Real estate ===
Following the example of his father, he invested in real estate, principally situated below Central Park, between 4th and 7th Avenues, which rapidly increased in value. For about 13 years prior to 1873, he was largely engaged in building until much of his hitherto unoccupied land was covered by houses. He was said to own in 1867 as many as 720 houses, and he was also heavily interested in railroad, coal, and insurance companies. His management of the family real estate holdings succeeded in multiplying their value, and he left an estate worth close to $50 million. His house at Barrytown, New York, known as Rokeby, was added to the National Register of Historic Places in 1975.

During the American Civil War, he successfully brought a case against the income tax imposed by the United States government, which was ruled unconstitutional.

=== Philanthropy ===
He added to the bequest of his father for the Astor Library the sum of $250,000, of which he paid during his lifetime $201,000 in land, books, and money. The Astor Library Building was completed under his directions in May, 1853. In 1855, he presented to the trustees the adjoining lot, and erected thereon a similar structure, which was completed in 1859. He next gave $50,000 for the purchase of books. He gave much patient attention for many years to the administration of the library.

He gave $50,000 to St. Luke's Hospital, and in his will he left $200,000 to the Astor Library, in addition to $49,000, the unexpended balance of his earlier donation. The gifts and bequests of William Backhouse Astor Sr. to the Astor Library amounted altogether to about $550,000. In 1879, William's eldest son John Jacob Astor III presented three lots adjoining the library building, and erected on them a third structure similar to the others, and added a story to the central building. His outlay, exclusive of land, was about $250,000, making the entire gift of the Astor family more than $1,000,000. In 1852–53, he built the St. Margaret's Home at Red Hook, New York, and supported it until his death in 1875.

== Personal life ==
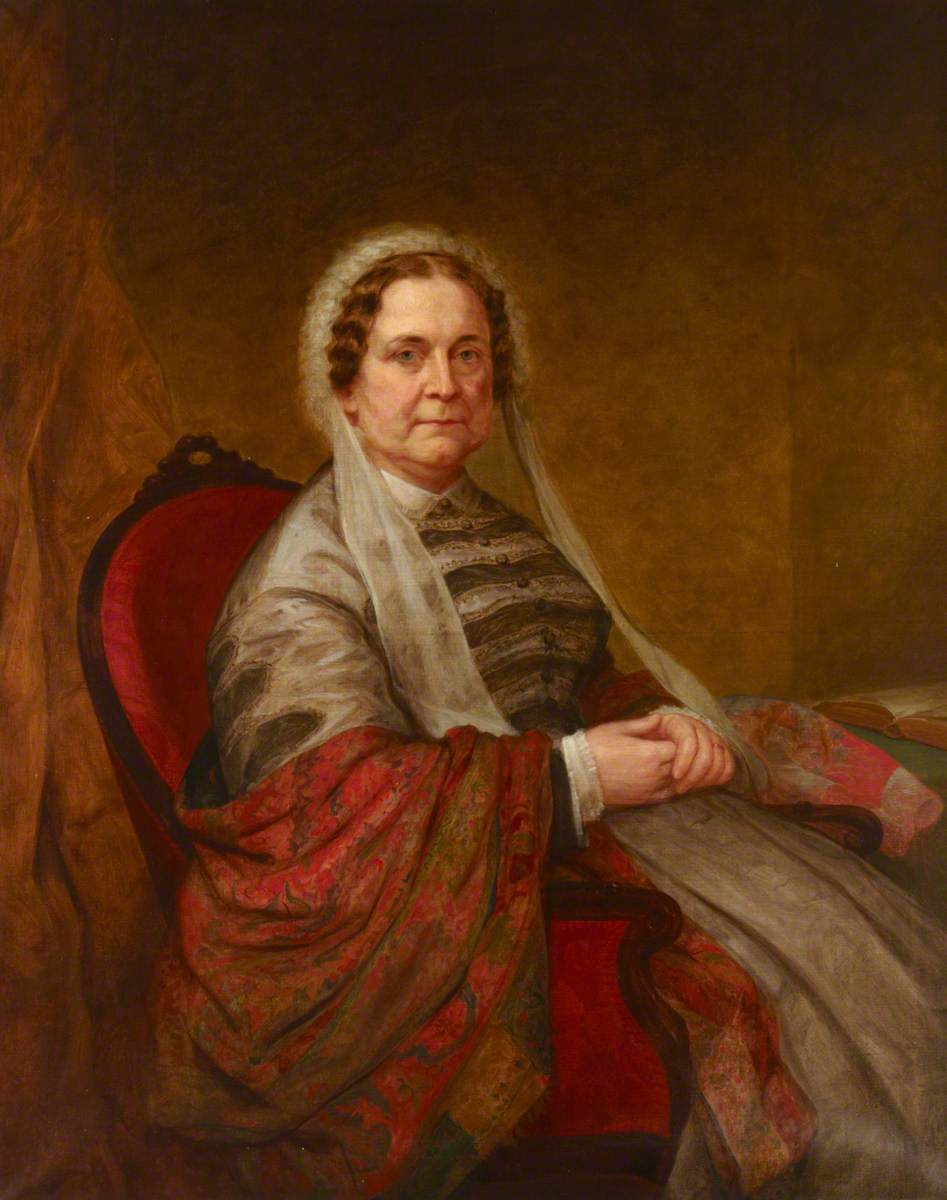
Portrait of Mrs. William Backhouse Astor (née Margaret Rebecca Armstrong), 1865

On May 20, 1818, William married Margaret Alida Rebecca Armstrong (1800–1872), the daughter of Senator John Armstrong Jr. and Alida (née Livingston) Armstrong and sister of Horatio Gates Armstrong. Her mother, a member of the prominent Livingston family, was the youngest child of Judge Robert Livingston and Margaret (née Beekman) Livingston as well as the sister of Chancellor Robert R. Livingston and Secretary of State Edward Livingston. Her father, John Armstrong Jr. was President James Madison's second Secretary of War. Together, William and Margaret had seven children:

1. Emily Astor (1819–1841), who married Samuel Cutler "Sam" Ward (1814–1884), a financier/lobbyist/author, on January 5, 1838, and had two children. (Note: Samuel Cutler Ward, a banker with Prime, Ward & King, was the son of Samuel Ward and the brother of poet Julia Ward Howe.)
2. John Jacob Astor III (1822–1890), who married Charlotte Augusta Matilda Gibbes (1825–1887) on December 9, 1846, and had one son.
3. Mary Alida Astor (1823–1881), who married John Carey (1821–1881) on April 16, 1850, and had three children.
4. Laura Eugenia Astor (1824–1902), who married Franklin Hughes Delano (1813–1893), on September 17, 1844 (no issue). (Note: Franklin Hughes Delano was the brother of Warren Delano and the uncle of Sara Ann Delano, who married James Roosevelt I (the parents of U.S. President Franklin Delano Roosevelt, who was born in 1882).)
5. William Backhouse Astor Jr. (1829–1892), who married socialite Caroline Webster "Lina" Schermerhorn (1830–1908) on September 20, 1853, and had five children.
6. Henry Astor III (1830–1918), who married Malvina Dinehart (1844–1918) in 1871 after which he was estranged from his family (no issue).
7. Sarah Todd Astor (1832–1832), who died in infancy.

As a wedding gift, Astor gave Franklin and Laura Delano the southernmost 100 acres of Rokeby estate. The estate came to be known as "Steen Valetje" (which means "little stone valley" in Dutch).

Margaret Astor died on February 15, 1872. William Astor survived his wife by three years, dying on November 24, 1875, in his townhouse at Lafayette Place in New York City. He was buried next to his wife in the Astor vault at Trinity Church Cemetery, designed by Frederick Clarke Withers, in New York City. In 1866, he conveyed the adjoining 142 acres of Rokeby to his son, Henry, who built a brick dwelling on this land, but in 1873, conveyed the property to Laura.

Astor's local newspaper The New York Times eulogised,

Mr. William B. Astor. an illness of four days ends an honored and successful life the public events in Mr. Astor's career a ripe scholar and philanthropic man. Mr William B. Astor, after an illness of only a few days, died at his residence in this City yesterday at 9:30 A.M., aged eighty three years. Mr. Astor was in his usual good health, except for a slight cold, until Saturday of last week. On that morning his cold began to trouble him and occasioned a severe cough.

== See also ==
- Rokeby (Barrytown, New York)
- "Steen Valetje"
