= Christian Schoen =

German art historian and curator (born 1970)

Christian Schoen (born 1970 in Marburg) is a German art historian and curator. He works on classical art (such as Albrecht Dürer or Auguste Rodin) and contemporary art phenomena. From 2000 to 2003 he co-curated the municipal gallery Lothringer13 in Munich. In 2005 he was appointed director of the Center for Icelandic Art, which he ran until 2010. As Commissioner he was responsible for the Icelandic Pavilion at the Biennale di Venezia 2007 and 2009. 2006 to 2008 he was member of the advisory board and the acquisition committee of the Reykjavík Art Museum. He co-founded the art festival Sequences in 2006. Since 2001 he is director of Osram Art Projects and assistant professor for transdisciplinary methods at the University St. Gallen (Switzerland).

== Publications (selection) ==
- GAEG: Thomas Huber/Wolfgang Aichner: passage2011, (Ed.) Hirmer, München 2012 ISBN 978-3-7774-5671-3
- Rúrí, (Ed.), Hatje-Cantz, Ostfildern 2011 ISBN 978-3-7757-2995-6
- Osram Seven Screens (Ed.), Hatje-Cantz, Ostfildern 2011 ISBN 978-3-7757-2804-1
- Icelandic Art Today, (Ed. C. Schoen by H.B. Runólfsson), Hatje-Cantz, Ostfildern 2009 ISBN 978-3-7757-2295-7
- Ragnar Kjartansson - The End, (Ed.), Hatje-Cantz, Ostfildern 2009 ISBN 978-3-7757-2333-6
- LIST icelandic art news, (Ed. with Jón Proppé) Reykjavik 2008, ISBN 3-936298-51-3
- Osram Art Projects 2007, Munich 2007, ISBN 3-936298-51-3
- Homesick, (Ed. by Hannes Sigurðsson), Akureyri 2006, ISBN 9979-9632-4-7
- Apfelböck oder über das Töten, Belleville, Munich 2005, ISBN 3-936298-51-3
- Albrecht Dürer. Adam und Eva Reimer Verlag, Berlin 2001, ISBN 3-496-01244-7
- lothringer13/halle. Aktuelle Kunst und neue Medien. Dokumentation 2000-2003,(Ed. by C. Schoen and M. Rosen) Norderstedt 2004, ISBN 3-8334-1840-0

== Essays ==
- Prolog für eine erfahrbare Zukunft/Prolog For a Future That Can be Experienced; in: repair. sind wir noch zu retten, Cat. Ars Electronica Festival, Ostfildern (Hatje Cantz) 2010, S. 216f
- Finnbogi Pétursson. Earth; in: ebda., S. 220f
- Benjamin Bergmann. Never Ever; in: ebda., S. 222
- Icelandic identity; in: Vanessa Adler (Ed.), Egill Saebjörnsson – The Book, Berlin 2009
- The Dead King; in: Christian Schoen (Ed.), Ragnar Kjartansson – The End, Ostfildern 2009, p. 63-78
- Iceland stuck between a rock and hard place; in: The Art Newspaper, #202, May 2009
- The End; in: Making Worlds - Fare Mondi, Cat. 53rd International Art Exhibition - La Biennale di Venezia, Verona 2009, p. 68/69
- Finnbogi Pétursson; in: Christian Schoen (Ed.), Icelandic Art Today, Ostfildern 2009, p. 90-95
- Georg Guðni; in: Christian Schoen (Ed.), Icelandic Art Today, Ostfildern 2009, p. 102-107
- Rúrí; in: Christian Schoen (Ed.), Icelandic Art Today, Ostfildern 2009, p. 258-263
- Sigurður Árni Sigurðsson; in: Christian Schoen (Ed.), Icelandic Art Today, Ostfildern 2009, p. 276-293
- Carolee Schneemann: The Icelandic Muse – Interview, LIST #18, 2008 (online)
- Vito Acconci – Interview, LIST #18, 2008 (online) and LIST 2008, p. 8
- Ragnar Kjartansson – Interview, LIST 2008, p. 16-17
- Rúrí – Interview, LIST 2008, p. 20-21
- Art Is Alchemy Is Art. Notes on Húbert Nóí’s Work, LIST 2008, p. 24
- Human Nature - Helgi Þorgils Fríðjónsson; in: Helgi Þorgils Fríðjónsson, Nordatlantens Brygge / North Atlantic House, Kopenhagen (Kat.), Reykjavík 2008, p. 50-51 (engl./Danish)
- Telling the Truth: Interview with Helgi Þorgils Friðjónsson; in: Helgi Þorgils Fríðjónsson, Nordatlantens Brygge / North Atlantic House, Kopenhagen (Kat.), Reykjavík 2008, p. 52 ff (engl./Danish) 65 00 N, 18 00 W. Observation from Inside and Out, LIST 2007, p. 4-5
- The Golden Plover Has Arrived – Eyfjörd’s Venice Project, LIST 2007, p. 14-15
- Steina Vasulka – Interview, LIST #4, #5 (online) und LIST 2007, p. 23
- Roni Horn, Interview (with Jón Proppé), LIST 2007, p. 26-28
- Monika Tress – Cadavres Exquis. Remnants of Existence, Nürnberg/Reykjavik 2007
- Tinsel Town/Mader, Stublic & Wiermann; in: DAMn, 10 – Design, Art & Architecture Magazine 2007
- Introduction Cat. Icelandic Pavilion at Biennale di Venezia: Steingrimur Eyfjörd: The Golden Plover Has Arrived, Reykjavik 2007
- Off With Their Heads. Interview with Diana Thater; in: OSRAM ART PROJECTS 2007
- Mader, Stublic, Wiermann: reprojected; in OSRAM ART PROJECTS 2007, Munich 2007
- Óðauðleg fegurð, Morgunblaðið (Lesbók), 8. Dezember 2007
- Ragnar Kjartansson: The Great Unrest; in: A Prior Magazine, 12, 2006, p. 141-163
- Flora Islandica: Junge Kunst in Island, in: Kunst und Kirche, 1/2006, p. 33-39
- Die Zeichen der Dinge. Zur Bedeutung der Fotografie im Werk Rodins; in: Auguste Rodin. Der Kuss. Die Paare, Ausst. Kat. Hypo-Kunsthalle München/ Museum Folkwang Essen, Munich 2006, S. 60
- Tobias Regensburger: Kunst – Leben – Überleben, Documentation of the project CAMP 2004 [MUC]
- Tobias Regensburger: Art – Life – Survival; in: NYartsmagazine November/December 2004
- Adam und Eva, nach Albrecht Dürer, in: Beutekunst unter Napoleon. Die französische Schenkung an Mainz 1803, Ausstellungskatalog Landesmuseum Mainz 2003, p. 299 – 304
- Adam und Eva, Achille Calzi und Ludovico Ferretti, in: Beutekunst unter Napoleon. Die französische Schenkung an Mainz 1803, Ausstellungskatalog Landesmuseum Mainz 2003, p. 304 – 305
- Adam und Eva, Johann Wierix, in: Beutekunst unter Napoleon. Die französische Schenkung an Mainz 1803, Ausstellungskatalog Landesmuseum Mainz 2003, p. 305 – 307

== Exhibitions ==
- Ragnar Kjartansson. The End, 2009, Icelandic Pavilion, Biennale di Venezia (Kommissar)
- The Chrono-Files (Jörg Auzinger, Maia Gusberti, Michael Aschauer, Sepp Deinhofer und Nik Thoenen, Peter Cornwell, Anja Krautgasser, infossil, Niki Passath, Axel Heide, Onesandzeros, Philip Pocock und Gregor Stehle, Artchalking) 2003, Städtische Kunsthalle lothringer13, München (Co-Kurator)
