= Luhring Augustine Gallery =

Art gallery in New York City

Coordinates: 40.7491°N 74.005°W

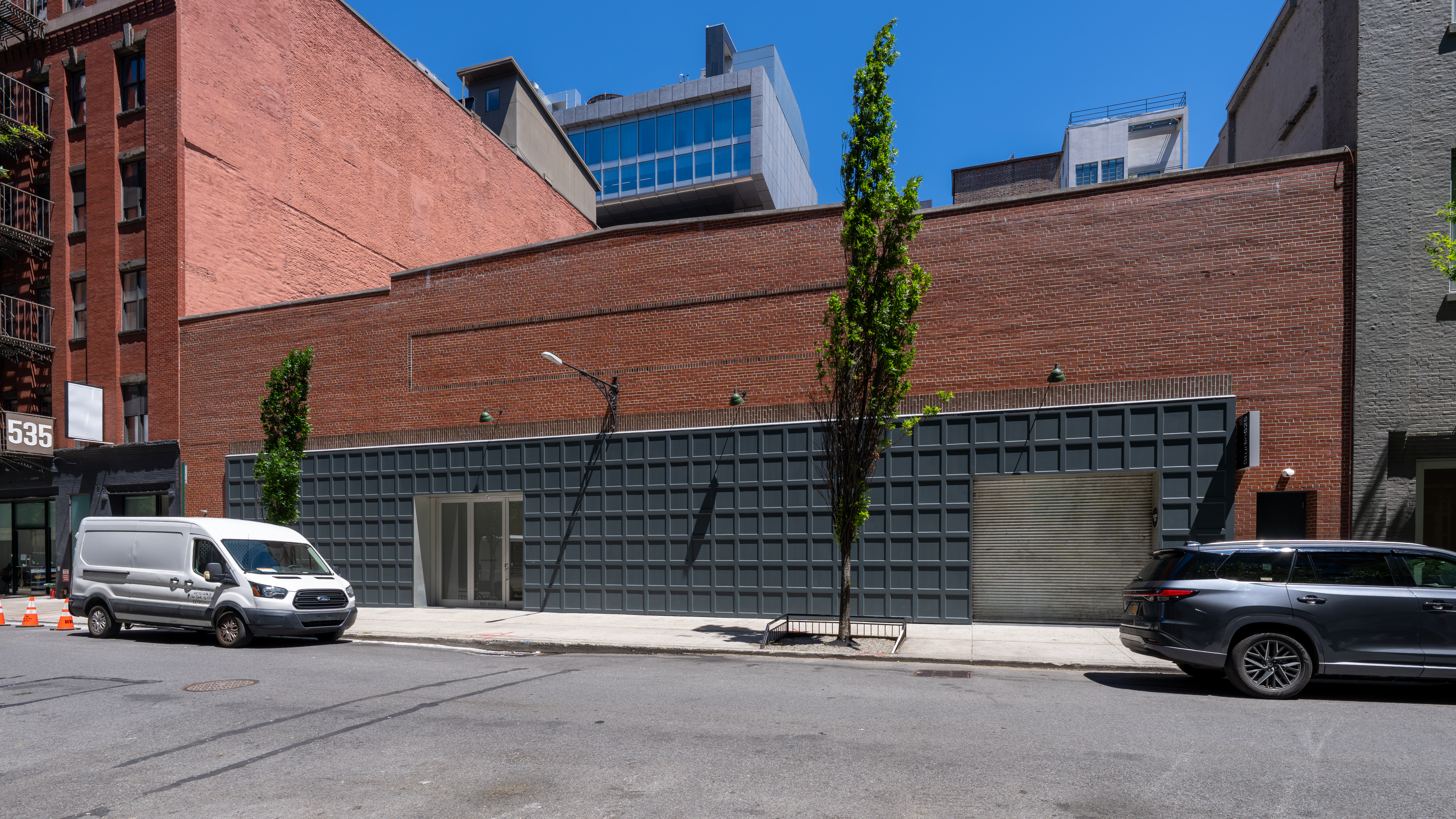
Luhring Augustine Gallery

The Luhring Augustine Gallery is an art gallery in New York City. The gallery has two locations: Chelsea and Tribeca. Its principal focus is the representation of an international group of contemporary artists whose diverse practices include painting, drawing, sculpture, video and photography.

== History ==
Luhring Augustine Gallery was founded in 1985 by co-owners Lawrence R. Luhring and Roland J. Augustine. From 1989 until 1992, the gallery also partnered with Galerie Max Hetzler on establishing Luhring Augustine Hetzler in Los Angeles. The 4,500 square feet (420 square metres) space was located in a refurbished building at 1330 4th Street in Santa Monica.

In 2012, Luhring Augustine opened a space in Bushwick, Brooklyn. In 2020, it opened a new 3,500 square feet (330 square metres) space in Tribeca.

The gallery is a member of the Art Dealers Association of America (ADAA). Roland Augustine served as president of the ADAA from 2006 to 2009.

== Artists ==
Each artist of the gallery has exhibited widely in museum and gallery contexts and has been regularly included in international exhibitions such as the Venice Bienniale, The Carnegie International, and Documenta. The exhibition program is best characterized by its adherence to a rigorous curatorial model that has incorporated critical monographic exhibitions such as Marcel Duchamp (1987), Gerhard Richter (1995) and Donald Judd (1999), which have served as historical antecedents for the contemporary program of the gallery.

Among others, Luhring Augustine Gallery has been representing the following living artists:

- Janine Antoni
- Charles Atlas
- Larry Clark
- Lee Friedlander (since 2019)
- Ragnar Kjartansson
- Jason Moran
- Michelangelo Pistoletto
- Pipilotti Rist
- Philip Taaffe (since 2012)
- Salman Toor (since 2020)
- Oscar Tuazon
- Rachel Whiteread (since 1992)
- Christopher Wool

In addition to living artists, Luhring Augustine Gallery also handles the estates of the following:

- Lygia Clark (since 2017)
- Jeremy Moon (since 2017)

Luhring Augustine Gallery has in the past represented the following:

- Simone Leigh (until 2020)
- Glenn Ligon (2009-2019)
- Daidō Moriyama (until 2019)
- Josh Smith (until 2017)
- Gregory Crewdson
- Joel Sternfeld

Since its founding, Luhring Augustine Gallery has also specialized in the resale of select works of art from the 20th century by artists such as Pablo Picasso, Jackson Pollock, Andy Warhol, Gerhard Richter and Sigmar Polke.

== Notable exhibitions ==
Janine Antoni's work Gnaw: Lard or Gnaw: Chocolate, the artist gnawing on lard and chocolate and turning them into lipsticks and chocolate boxes, was first exhibited at the gallery in 1992. Paul McCarthy's 1996 installation at the gallery, Yaa-Hoo, featured mechanized mannequins performing sexual acts.

The gallery's inaugural exhibition in their Bushwick, Brooklyn location was a solo installation by Charles Atlas titled The Illusion of Democracy, which featured two large-scale video projections, Plato’s Alley (2009) and Painting By Numbers (2008). Each installation displayed massive light projections of vertical lines, grids, and numerical values. The work was a departure from Atlas' more signature style of art making that involves collaborations with dancers and other artists. He reflected, "I tried to imagine I was an unknown artist with a different sensibility."

In addition to exhibiting the work of modern and contemporary artists, Luhring Augustine has, in collaboration with Sam Fogg Galler, hosted two historical exhibitions of Medieval Art: Of Earth and Heaven (2018) and Gothic Spirit (2020).
