= Migros Museum of Contemporary Art =

Art museum in Switzerland

Migros Museum für Gegenwartskunst
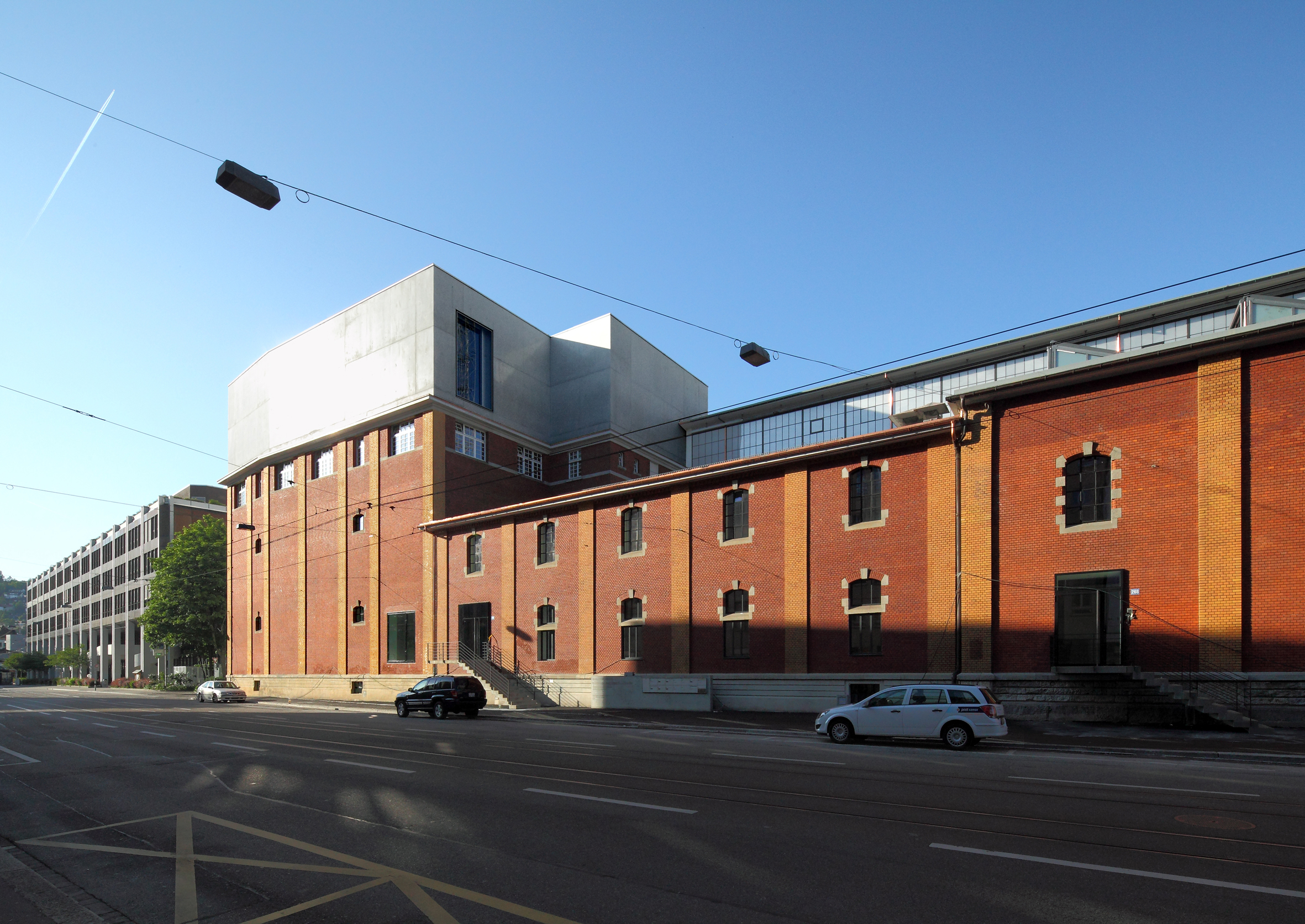
- Löwenbräukunst-Areal (2012)
- Established: 1996
- Location: Limmatstrasse 270, Zürich
- Coordinates: 47°23′21.8″N 8°31′29.6″E
- Type: Art museum
- Founders: Gottlieb Duttweiler, Rein Wolfs
- Directors: Catherine Reymond, Patrick Ilg, Tasnim Baghdadi, Michael Birchall and Nadia Schneider Willen
- Architect: Gigon/Guyer
- Website: www.migrosmuseum.ch

The Migros Museum of Contemporary Art (German: Migros Museum für Gegenwartskunst) is a museum for contemporary art in Zürich, Switzerland. Founded in 1996 by Gottlieb Duttweiler, the museum was directed by Rein Wolfs up until 2001, when he was replaced by Heike Munder.

It is the successor to the Halle für Internationale neue Kunst, which existed from 1978 until 1981. It receives financing from the cooperative society Migros, which dedicates 1% of earnings, the so-called Kulturprozent to culture.

The museum was renovated between 2010 and 2012 and reopened on August 31, 2012, with the first Swiss solo exhibition by Ragnar Kjartansson. The museum has two floors with a total area of approximately 1300 m^{2}. One floor is used to display the collection, the other is used for temporary exhibitions. The collection contains over 1300 works by 700 artists.

In 2023 it was announced that the museum would replace the traditional structure of having one single directorial figure with a pool of five departmental representatives each assuming an equal role in managing the institution. The team was formed by Catherine Reymond, Patrick Ilg, Tasnim Baghdadi, Michael Birchall and Nadia Schneider Willen.

== Exhibitions ==
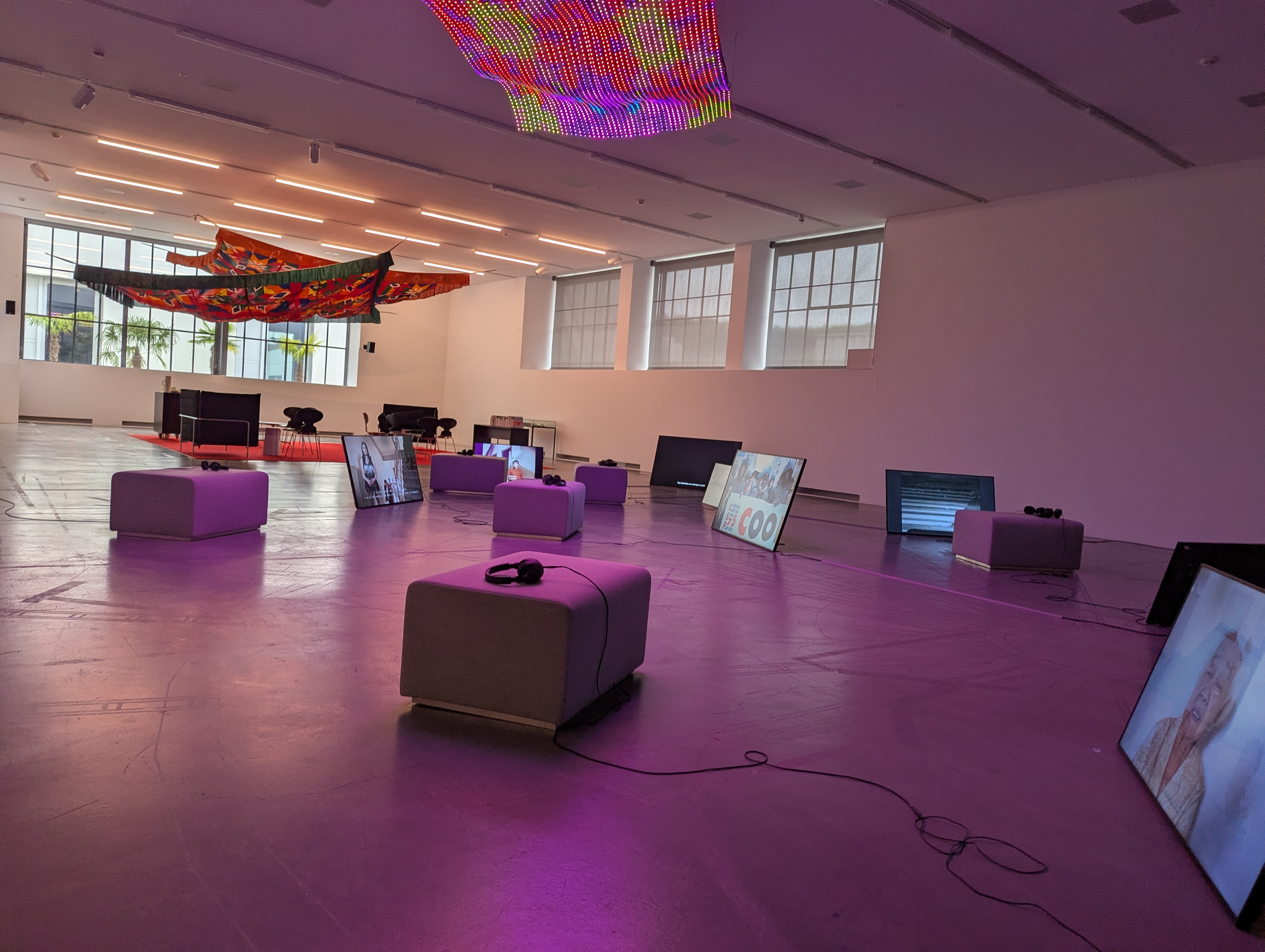
Disobedience Archive (Canopy for Broken Time)

Some of the artists who have had solo presentations of their work in the museum include:

- John Baldessari
- Stefan Banz
- Heidi Bucher
- Maurizio Cattelan
- Anne-Lise Coste
- Jimmie Durham
- Sylvie Fleury
- Kendell Geers
- Dorothy Iannone
- Mike Kelley
- Gianni Motti
- Cady Noland
- Yoko Ono
- Pamela Rosenkranz
- Xanti Schawinsky
- Tatiana Trouvé
- Cathy Wilkes
- Wu Tsang

== See also ==
- List of museums in Switzerland
