= Southampton Township =

Southampton Township may refer to:

- Southampton Township, New Jersey
- Southampton Township, Bedford County, Pennsylvania
- Southampton Township, Cumberland County, Pennsylvania
- Southampton Township, Franklin County, Pennsylvania
- Southampton Township, Somerset County, Pennsylvania

== See also ==
- Southampton (disambiguation)
- Lower Southampton Township
- Upper Southampton Township
