= Southampton Township, Pennsylvania =

Southampton Township is the name of some places in the U.S. state of Pennsylvania:

- Southampton Township, Bedford County, Pennsylvania
- Southampton Township, Cumberland County, Pennsylvania
- Southampton Township, Franklin County, Pennsylvania
- Southampton Township, Somerset County, Pennsylvania

== See also ==
- Southampton, Pennsylvania, an unincorporated community in southeastern Bucks County
- Southampton (disambiguation)
- Lower Southampton Township, Pennsylvania
- Upper Southampton Township, Bucks County, Pennsylvania
