= Twin Bridge =

Twin Bridge may refer to:

- Twin Bridge (Fayette, Iowa), listed on the National Register of Historic Places in Fayette County, Iowa
- Twin Bridge (Brownlee, Nebraska), listed on the National Register of Historic Places in Cherry County, Nebraska

== See also ==
- I-10 Twin Span Bridge, connecting New Orleans to Slidell, Louisiana
- McClay's Twin Bridge (East), a historic bridge in Franklin County, Pennsylvania
- McClay's Twin Bridge (West), a historic bridge in Franklin County, Pennsylvania
- Twin Bridges (disambiguation)
