= Twin Bridges =

Twin Bridges may refer:

- Twin bridges, a pair of parallel bridges

== Inhabited places in the United States ==
- Twin Bridges, California
- Twin Bridges, Montana
- Twin Bridges, Missouri, the former name of Evergreen, Missouri
- Twin Bridges, Nevada

== Bridges ==
=== United States ===
- I-10 Twin Span Bridge, between New Orleans and Slidell, Louisiana
- Bi-State Vietnam Gold Star Bridges, a pair of twin bridges that cross the Ohio River between Henderson, Kentucky and Evansville, Indiana
- Queensway Twin Bridges, Long Beach, California
- Thaddeus Kosciusko Bridge, north of Albany, New York
- Twin Bridges (Danville, Indiana), listed on the NRHP in Indiana
- Twin Bridges (Philadelphia), Pennsylvania
- Twin Bridges-West Paden Covered Bridge No. 121, a historic wooden covered bridge Columbia County, Pennsylvania
- The Twin Bridges or I-74 Bridge, connecting Bettendorf, Iowa and Moline, Illinois

=== Other places ===
- Ponts Jumeaux (French for Twin Bridges), Southern France

== Other uses ==
- Twin Bridges State Park, northeastern Oklahoma
- Twin Bridges Trailhead, near Strawberry, California

== See also ==
- Twin Bridge (disambiguation)
- Twin Bridges Airport (disambiguation)
