= Southampton (disambiguation) =

Southampton is the largest city in Hampshire, England.

Southampton may also refer to:

== Australia ==
- Southampton, Western Australia, a locality of the Shire of Donnybrook–Balingup
- Southampton homestead, historical homestead in Western Australia

== Canada ==
- Southampton, New Brunswick
- Southampton Parish, New Brunswick
- Southampton, Nova Scotia
- Southampton, Ontario
- Southampton Island in Nunavut

== United Kingdom ==
- Southampton (UK Parliament constituency), abolished in 1950
- Southampton F.C.
- Port of Southampton
- University of Southampton
- Earl of Southampton
- Duke of Southampton
- Baron Southampton
- Southampton Parish, Bermuda, British overseas territory

== United States ==
- Southampton, Massachusetts
- Southampton, St. Louis, Missouri, a neighborhood in the southwest portion of the city
- South Hampton, New Hampshire
- Southampton Township, New Jersey
- Southampton, New York
  - Southampton (village), New York
- Southampton, Pennsylvania
- Southampton Township, Bedford County, Pennsylvania
- Southampton Township, Cumberland County, Pennsylvania
- Southampton Township, Franklin County, Pennsylvania
- Southampton Township, Somerset County, Pennsylvania
- Southampton, Houston, Texas, a neighborhood in the southwest portion of the city
- Southampton County, Virginia

== Naval forces ==
- HMS Southampton (1693), a 48-gun fourth rate
- HMS Southampton (1757), a 32-gun fifth rate
- HMS Southampton (1820), a 60-gun fourth rate Southampton-class frigate launched in 1820
- HMS Southampton (1912), a 1910 Town-class cruiser
- HMS Southampton (83), a 1936 Town-class cruiser launched in 1936
- HMS Southampton (D90), a Type 42 destroyer launched in 1979
- USS Southampton (1841), a side-wheel steamer
- USS Southampton (AKA-66), a Tolland-class attack cargo ship that served from 1944 until 1946

== Other uses ==
- Southampton station (disambiguation), stations of the name
- Supermarine Southampton, a British 1930s flying boat
- Southampton Dock, a song by Pink Floyd

== See also ==
- Bloomsbury Square, formerly Southampton Square, London
- South Hampton (disambiguation)
- Southampton Row, Camden, London
- Southampton Street, London
