= Samuel Maclay =

American politician (1741–1811)

United States Senator from Pennsylvania
- In office March 4, 1803 – January 4, 1809
- Preceded by: James Ross
- Succeeded by: Michael Leib

Member of the U.S. House of Representatives from Pennsylvania's 6th district
- In office March 4, 1795 – March 3, 1797
- Preceded by: Andrew Gregg
- Succeeded by: John A. Hanna

Member of the Pennsylvania Senate
- In office 1798–1802

Member of the Pennsylvania House of Representatives
- In office 1797

Personal details
- Born: June 17, 1741 Lurgan Township, Province of Pennsylvania, British America
- Died: October 5, 1811 (aged 70) Buffalo Township, Pennsylvania, U.S.
- Party: Democratic-Republican

Samuel Maclay (June 17, 1741 – October 5, 1811) was an American politician from Union County, Pennsylvania. He served in the state legislature and represented Pennsylvania in both the U.S. House and the United States Senate.

== Biography ==
Maclay was born the younger brother of future Pennsylvania senator William Maclay. He was born in Lurgan Township in the Province of Pennsylvania at Maclay's Mill and served in the Revolutionary War. Maclay came to the Buffalo Valley in Union County in 1769, then in Cumberland and Berks Counties, to perform some of the first surveys, along with and under the supervision of brother William, in "the new purchase" of land made by the Penn Family pursuant to the Treaty at Fort Stanwix in 1768.

In 1790, Maclay performed work as a surveyor of the streams of northwestern Pennsylvania, equating to something of a "Lewis & Clark Expedition" of the dangerous interior wilds of Pennsylvania. He became an associate judge of Franklin County, Pennsylvania and served between 1792 and 1795. Maclay was the father of William Plunkett Maclay.

== Political life ==
Maclay was elected to the Fourth Congress. He served as a member of the lower house of the State legislature in 1797 and was a member of the Pennsylvania State Senate from 1798 to 1802 and served as speaker from 1801 to 1802.

He was elected to the United States Senate as a Democratic-Republican by the Pennsylvania legislature and began service in 1803. Popular among Pennsylvanians, he was an infrequent Senate speaker but was frequently mentioned as his party's possible candidate for governor, but was passed over in favor of Simon Snyder.

Maclay opposed the nomination of James Madison to the presidency by the Democratic-Republicans. He doubted how committed Madison was to the party, considering him a late convert, and backed George Clinton instead. Furthermore, Maclay was an opponent of the Embargo Act which had been passed during President Jefferson's second term. Despite the eventual repeal of the Embargo Act, Madison secured Pennsylvania's support and Maclay realized that he was out of step with his fellow party members and Pennsylvanians. Seeing no hope of reelection, he resigned from the Senate in 1809.

Maclay served in the Senate from March 4, 1803, until his resignation on January 4, 1809. He retired to Buffalo Township, Pennsylvania, where he died, at age 70. He was interred in the Driesbach Church Cemetery in Union County.

== Bibliography ==
- American National Biography; Dictionary of American Biography; Aurand, A. Monroe, Jr. The Genealogy of Samuel Maclay, 1741–1811. Harrisburg, Pennsylvania: Aurand Press, 1938;
- Maclay, Samuel. Journal of Samuel Maclay. Williamsport, Pennsylvania: Gazette & Bulletin Printing House, 1887.

U.S. House of Representatives
Preceded by At large on a General ticket: Thomas Fitzsimons; John W. Kittera; Thomas Hartley; Thomas Scott; James Armstrong; Peter G. Muhlenberg; Andrew Gregg; Frederick A.C. Muhlenberg; Daniel Hiester; William Irvine; William Findley; John Smilie and William Montgomery	Member of the U.S. House of Representatives from Pennsylvania's 10th congressional district 1795–1797 alongside: David Bard	Succeeded by David Bard
U.S. Senate
Preceded by James Ross	U.S. senator (Class 1) from Pennsylvania; 1803–1809; Served alongside: George Logan, Andrew Gregg	Succeeded by Michael Leib
