= 1802 United States Senate election in Pennsylvania =

The 1802 United States Senate election in Pennsylvania was held on December 14, 1802. Samuel Maclay was elected by the Pennsylvania General Assembly to the United States Senate.

== Results ==
Incumbent Federalist Senator James Ross, who was elected in 1794 and re-elected in 1797, was not a candidate for re-election to another term. The Pennsylvania General Assembly, consisting of the House of Representatives and the Senate, convened on December 14, 1802, to elect a new senator to fill the term beginning on March 4, 1803. The results of the vote of both houses combined are as follows:

State legislature results
Party	Candidate	Votes	%
Democratic-Republican	Samuel Maclay	66	59.46
Democratic-Republican	Isaac Weaver	28	25.23
Democratic-Republican	William Maclay	11	9.91
N/A	Not voting	6	5.41
Totals		111	100.00%

Preceded by 1797	Pennsylvania U.S. Senate election (Class I); 1802	Succeeded by 1808
