= Middle Spring Creek =

Stream in the U.S. state of Pennsylvania

Coordinates: 40.105252°N 77.559225°W

Middle Spring Creek is a 7.2-mile-long (11.6 km) tributary of the Conodoguinet Creek in Franklin and Cumberland counties in Pennsylvania in the United States.

The stream runs through the heart of Shippensburg and into Franklin County.

Middle Spring Creek joins the Conodoguinet just south of a village named Mowersville.

== See also ==
- List of rivers of Pennsylvania
