= Thomas McKean =

American Founding Father and politician (1734–1817)

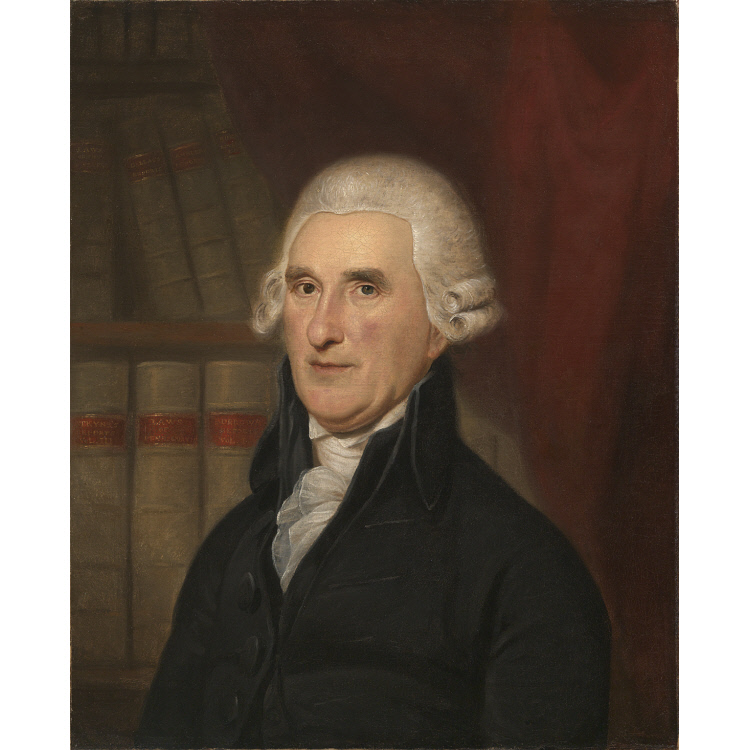
- Portrait by Charles Willson Peale, c. 1787–1800

2nd Governor of Pennsylvania
- In office December 17, 1799 – December 20, 1808
- Preceded by: Thomas Mifflin
- Succeeded by: Simon Snyder

Chief Justice of the Pennsylvania Supreme Court
- In office July 28, 1777 – December 17, 1799
- Preceded by: Benjamin Chew
- Succeeded by: Edward Shippen IV

2nd President of the Confederation Congress
- In office July 10, 1781 – November 4, 1781
- Preceded by: Samuel Huntington
- Succeeded by: John Hanson

Member of the Continental Congress from Delaware
- In office December 17, 1777 – February 1, 1783
- In office August 2, 1774 – November 7, 1776

2nd President of Delaware
- In office September 22, 1777 – October 20, 1777
- Preceded by: John McKinly
- Succeeded by: George Read

Personal details
- Born: March 19, 1734 New London Township, Pennsylvania Province, British America
- Died: June 24, 1817 (aged 83) Philadelphia, Pennsylvania, U.S.
- Resting place: Laurel Hill Cemetery
- Party: Federalist (before 1796); Democratic-Republican (1796–1817)
- Spouse(s): Mary Borden; Sarah Armitage

Thomas McKean (/mɪkˈkeɪn/; March 19, 1734 – June 24, 1817) was an American lawyer, politician, and Founding Father. During the American Revolution he was a Delaware delegate to the Continental Congress in Philadelphia, where he signed the Continental Association, the Declaration of Independence, and the Articles of Confederation. He served as President of Congress for four months in 1781. McKean was at various times a member of the Federalist and the Democratic-Republican parties and served as president of Delaware, chief justice of Pennsylvania, and the second governor of Pennsylvania. He also held numerous other public offices.

== Early life and education ==
McKean's coat of arms

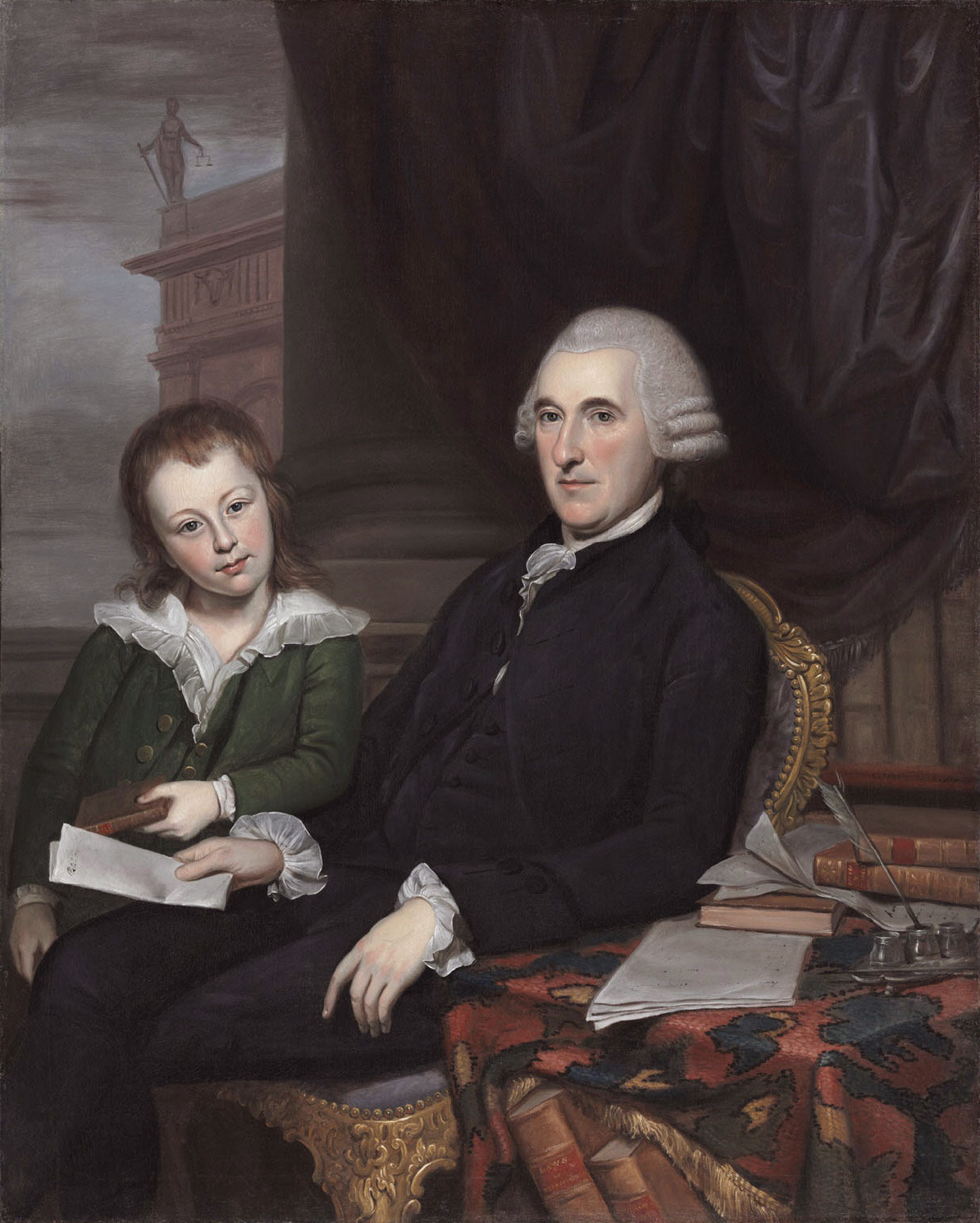
Portrait of McKean and his son Thomas Jr. by Charles Willson Peale, c. 1787

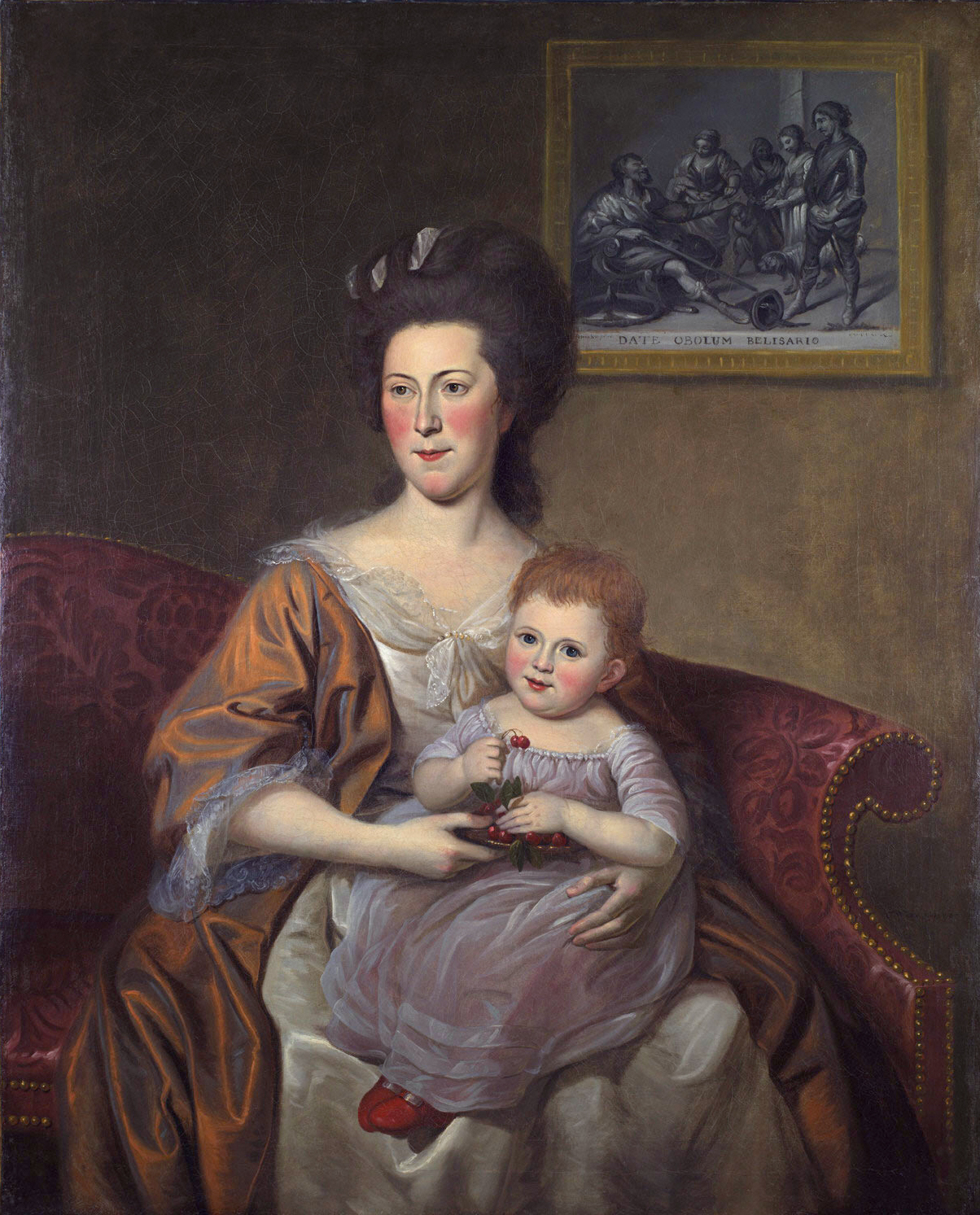
Sarah Armitage McKean with their daughter Maria Louisa (Charles Willson Peale, 1787)

McKean was born on March 19, 1734, in New London Township in the Province of Pennsylvania, then one of the Thirteen Colonies of British America, to William McKean and Letitia Finney. His father, William, immigrated from Ireland to the Colony of Pennsylvania in 1720, and was later listed as a tavern keeper.

When his mother, Letitia, died in the fall of 1742, it took a strain on Thomas's, father, William. He quickly became an alcoholic, and because of that, was incapable of raising his family. Thomas's younger sister, went to go live with their aunt and uncle, while eight-year-old Thomas, and ten-year-old, Robert began their education under Reverend Francis Alison at his school in New Castle, Delaware.

During his education, McKean took on a boyhood attitude, beyond his studies. By the time he reached his adolescence, he had learned how to ride a horse and shoot a gun. Though the school was simply for boys, McKean did interact with some females, which included Reverend Alison's wife, Hannah Armitage, and her toddler half-sister, Sarah Armitage, though McKean gave her little attention, preferring to be with his friends, Charles Thomson and George Read. After a decade studying at Dr. Alison's academy, McKean's brother, Robert, left for London to study medicine, which was the first time the two were separated.

In 1750, McKean finally finished his studies with Dr. Alison, and shortly thereafter moved in with his uncle, John Finney, who was a wealthy lawyer at the time. During this, McKean studied with his cousin, David Finney, and after four years, in 1754, he was finally admitted to the Bar (law).

At some point, McKean met Mary Borden, the daughter of Colonel Joseph Borden of New Jersey. They would marry on July 21, 1763 in Mary's hometown of Bordentown. Together, they had six children, two boys, and four girls, one of whom died in childhood. Mary Borden would die on March 12, 1773, in Delaware of an unknown cause.

After the death of Mary Borden, McKean reconnected with Sarah Armitage, who he married on September 16, 1774. They lived at the northeast corner of Third and Pine Street in Philadelphia. They had four children, one of whom married the Spanish diplomat, Carlos Martínez de Irujo, who was appointed to his position in 1796.

== Career ==
In 1755, he was admitted to the bar of the Lower Counties, as Delaware was then known, and likewise in the Province of Pennsylvania the following year. In 1756, he was appointed deputy attorney general for Sussex County. From the 1762–1763 session to the 1775–1776 session, he was a member of the General Assembly of the Lower Counties, serving as its speaker in 1772–1773. From July 1765, he also served as a judge of the Court of Common Pleas and began service as the customs collector at New Castle in 1771. In November 1765, his Court of Common Pleas became the first such court in the colonies to establish a rule for all the proceedings of the court to be recorded on unstamped paper. In 1768, McKean was elected to the revived American Philosophical Society.

Delaware was politically divided in the 18th century into loose political factions known as the "Court Party" and the "Country Party". The majority Court Party was generally Anglican, was strongest in Kent and Sussex counties, worked well with the colonial Proprietary government, and supported reconciliation with the British government. The minority Country Party was largely Irish Presbyterian, also referred to as "Scotch-Irish", was centered in New Castle County, Delaware, and quickly advocated independence from the British. The revolutionary slogan "no taxation without representation" had originated in the north of Ireland under the British Penal Laws, which denied Presbyterians and Catholics the right to vote for members of the parliament. McKean was the epitome of the Country Party politician and was, as much as anyone else, its leader. As such, he generally worked in partnership with Caesar Rodney from Kent County and in opposition to his friend and neighbor, George Read.

At the Stamp Act Congress of 1765, McKean and Caesar Rodney represented Delaware. McKean proposed the voting procedure that the Continental Congress later adopted: each colony, regardless of size or population, would have one vote. That decision set the precedent, the Congress of the Articles of Confederation adopted the practice, and the principle of state equality has continued in the composition of the United States Senate.

McKean quickly became one of the most influential members of the Stamp Act Congress. He was on the committee that drew the memorial to parliament and, with John Rutledge and Philip Livingston, revised its proceedings. On the last day of its session, when the business session ended, Timothy Ruggles, the president of the body, and a few other more cautious members refused to sign the memorial of rights and grievances. McKean arose and addressing the chair insisted that the president give his reasons for his refusal. After refusing at first, Ruggles remarked that "it was against his conscience." McKean then disputed his use of the word "conscience" so loudly and so long that a challenge was given by Ruggles and accepted in the presence of the Congress. However, Ruggles left the next morning at daybreak, and so the duel did not take place.

== American Revolution ==
The presentation of the Declaration of Independence to Congress.

In spite of his primary residence in Philadelphia, McKean remained the effective leader for American independence in Delaware. Along with Read and Caesar Rodney, he was one of Delaware's delegates to the First Continental Congress in 1774 and the Second Continental Congress in 1775 and 1776. Being an outspoken advocate of independence, McKean was a key voice in persuading others to vote for a split with Great Britain. When Congress began debating a resolution of independence in June 1776, Rodney was absent. Read was against independence, which meant that the Delaware delegation was split between McKean and Read and therefore could not vote in favor of independence. McKean requested that the absent Rodney ride all night from Dover to break the tie. After the vote in favor of independence on July 2, McKean participated in the debate over the wording of the official Declaration of Independence, which was approved on July 4.

A few days after McKean cast his vote, he left Congress to serve as colonel in command of the Fourth Battalion of the Pennsylvania Associators, a militia unit created by Benjamin Franklin in 1747. They joined General George Washington's defense of New York City at Perth Amboy, New Jersey. Being away, McKean was not available when most of the signers placed their signatures on the Declaration of Independence on August 2, 1776. Since his signature did not appear on the printed copy that was authenticated on January 17, 1777, it is assumed that he signed after that date, possibly as late as 1781.

Portrait by Charles Willson Peale, c. 1781–1782

In a conservative reaction against the advocates of American independence, the 1776-1777 Delaware General Assembly did not reelect either McKean or Rodney to the Continental Congress in October 1776. However, the British occupation after the Battle of Brandywine swung opinions enough that McKean was returned to Congress in October 1777 by the 1777–1778 Delaware General Assembly. During that time, he was constantly pursued by British forces. Over the course of the following years, he was forced to relocate his family five times.

He served continuously in the Congress until February 1, 1783. McKean helped draft the Articles of Confederation and voted for their adoption on March 1, 1781. When poor health caused Samuel Huntington to resign as president of Congress in July 1781, McKean was elected as his successor. He served from July 10 to November 4, 1781. The position was mostly ceremonial with no real authority, but the office required McKean to handle a good deal of correspondence and sign official documents. During his time in office, Lord Cornwallis's British army surrendered at Yorktown, which effectively ended the war.

== Government of Delaware ==
Meanwhile, McKean led the effort in the General Assembly of Delaware to declare its separation from the British government, which it did on June 15, 1776. In August, he was elected to the special convention to draft a new state constitution. Upon hearing of it, McKean made the long ride to Dover, Delaware, from Philadelphia in a single day, went to a room in an inn, and that night, virtually by himself, drafted the document. It was adopted September 20, 1776. The Delaware Constitution of 1776 became the first state constitution to be produced after the Declaration of Independence.

McKean was elected to Delaware's first House of Assembly for both the 1776–1777 and the 1778–1779 sessions, succeeding John McKinly as speaker on February 12, 1777, when McKinly became president of Delaware. Shortly after President McKinly's capture and imprisonment, McKean served as the president of Delaware for a month, from September 22 to October 20, 1777. That was the time needed for the successor George Read to return from the Continental Congress in Philadelphia and to assume the duties.

Immediately after the Battle of Brandywine, the British Army occupied Wilmington and much of northern New Castle County. Its navy also controlled the lower Delaware River and Delaware Bay. As a result, the state capital, New Castle, was unsafe as a meeting place, and the Sussex County seat, Lewes, was sufficiently disrupted by Loyalists that it was unable to hold a valid general election that autumn. As president, McKean was primarily occupied with recruitment of the militia and with keeping some semblance of civic order in the portions of the state still under his control.

Delaware General Assembly (sessions while President)
Year	Assembly	Senate Majority	Speaker	House Majority	Speaker
1776/77	1st	non-partisan	George Read	non-partisan	vacant

== Government of Pennsylvania ==
McKean started his long tenure as chief justice of Pennsylvania on July 28, 1777, and served in that capacity until 1799. There, he largely set the rules of justice for revolutionary Pennsylvania. According to the biographer John Coleman, "only the historiographical difficulty of reviewing court records and other scattered documents prevents recognition that McKean, rather than John Marshall, did more than anyone else to establish an independent judiciary in the United States. As chief justice under a Pennsylvania constitution he considered flawed, he assumed it the right of the court to strike down legislative acts it deemed unconstitutional, preceding by ten years the U.S. Supreme Court's establishment of the doctrine of judicial review. He augmented the rights of defendants and sought penal reform, but on the other hand was slow to recognize expansion of the legal rights of women and the processes in the state's gradual elimination of slavery."

He was a member of the convention of Pennsylvania that ratified the Constitution of the United States. In the Pennsylvania State Constitutional Convention of 1789/90, he argued for a strong executive and was himself a Federalist. Nevertheless, in 1796, dissatisfied with the Federalists' domestic policies and compromises with Great Britain, he became an outspoken Jeffersonian Republican, or Democratic-Republican.

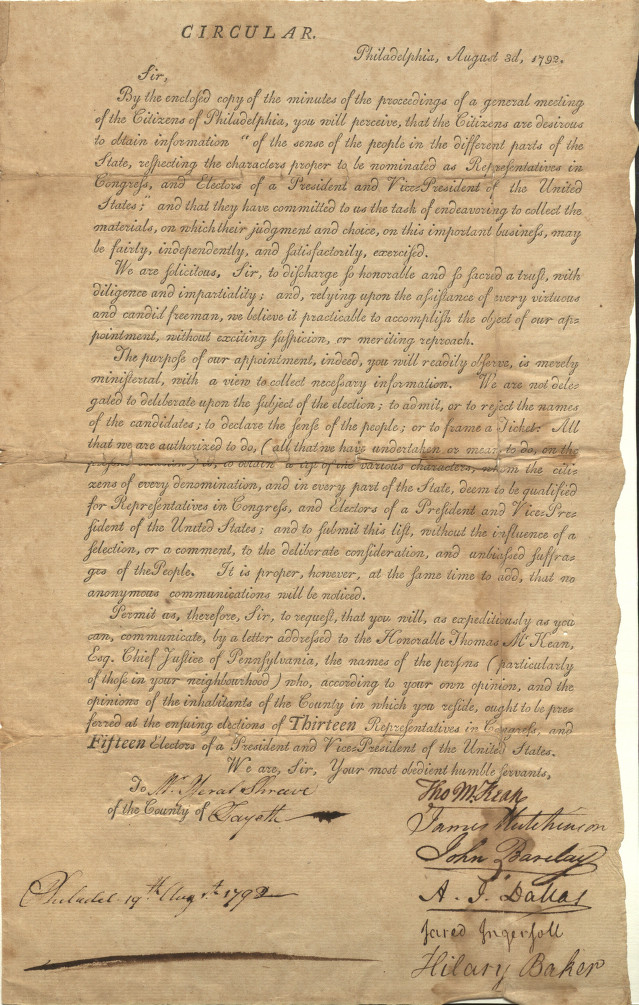
Letter from Thomas McKean to Israel Shreve, 1792

While chief justice of Pennsylvania, McKean played a role in the Whiskey Rebellion. On August 2, 1794, he took part in a conference on the rebellion. In attendance were Washington, his Cabinet, the governor of Pennsylvania, and other officials. Washington interpreted the rebellion to be a grave threat could mean "an end to our Constitution and laws." Washington advocated "the most spirited and firm measure" but held back on what that meant. McKean argued that the matter should be left up to the courts, not the military, to prosecute and punish the rebels. Alexander Hamilton insisted upon the "propriety of an immediate resort to Military force." Some weeks later, Mckean and General William Irvine wrote to Pennsylvania Governor Thomas Mifflin and discussed the mission of federal committees to negotiate with the Rebels, describing them as "well disposed." However, McKean and Irvine felt the government must suppress the insurrection to prevent it from spreading to nearby counties.

McKean was elected governor of Pennsylvania and served three terms from December 17, 1799, to December 20, 1808. In the 1799 election, he defeated the Federalist Party nominee James Ross and again more easily in the 1802 election. At first, McKean ousted Federalists from state government positions and so he has been called the father of the spoils system. However, in seeking a third term in 1805, McKean was at odds with factions of his own Democratic-Republican Party, and the Pennsylvania General Assembly instead nominated Speaker Simon Snyder for governor. McKean then forged an alliance with Federalists, called "the Quids," and defeated Snyder. Afterwards, he began removing Jeffersonians from state positions.

The governor's beliefs in stronger executive and judicial powers were bitterly denounced by the influential Aurora newspaper publisher William P. Duane and the Philadelphia populist Michael Leib. After they led public attacks calling for his impeachment, McKean filed a partially successful libel suit against Duane in 1805. The Pennsylvania House of Representatives impeached the governor in 1807, but, for the rest of his term, his friends prevented an impeachment trial from being held, and the matter was dropped. When the suit was settled after McKean left office, his son Joseph angrily criticized Duane's attorney for alleging out of context that McKean referred to the people of Pennsylvania as "clodpoles" (clodhoppers).

Some of McKean's other accomplishments included expanding free education for all and, at age eighty, leading a Philadelphia citizens group to organize a strong defense during the War of 1812. He spent his retirement in Philadelphia in writing, discussing political affairs, and enjoying the considerable wealth that he had earned through investments and real estate.

== Death, honors, and legacy ==
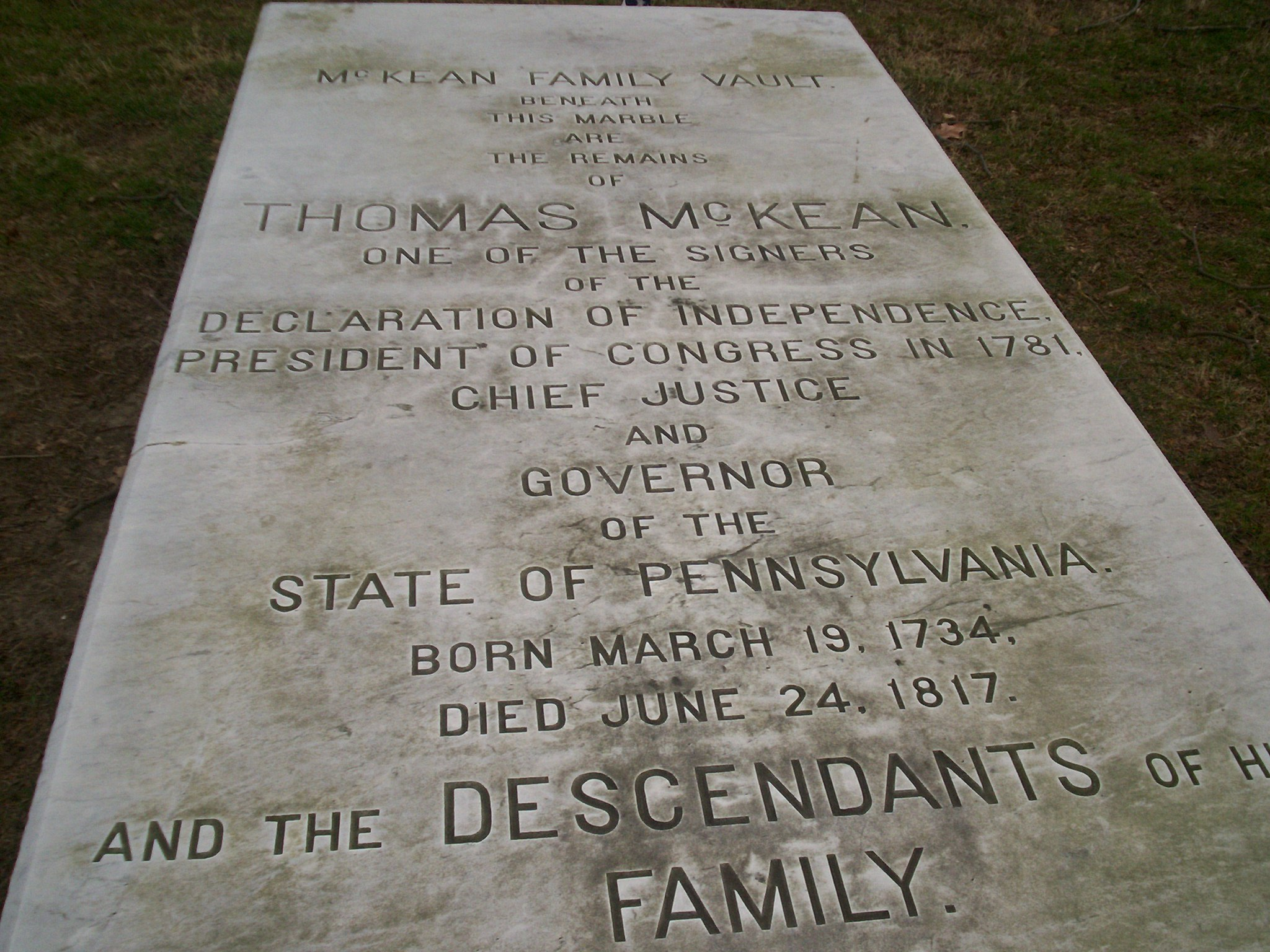
Thomas McKean gravestone in Laurel Hill Cemetery

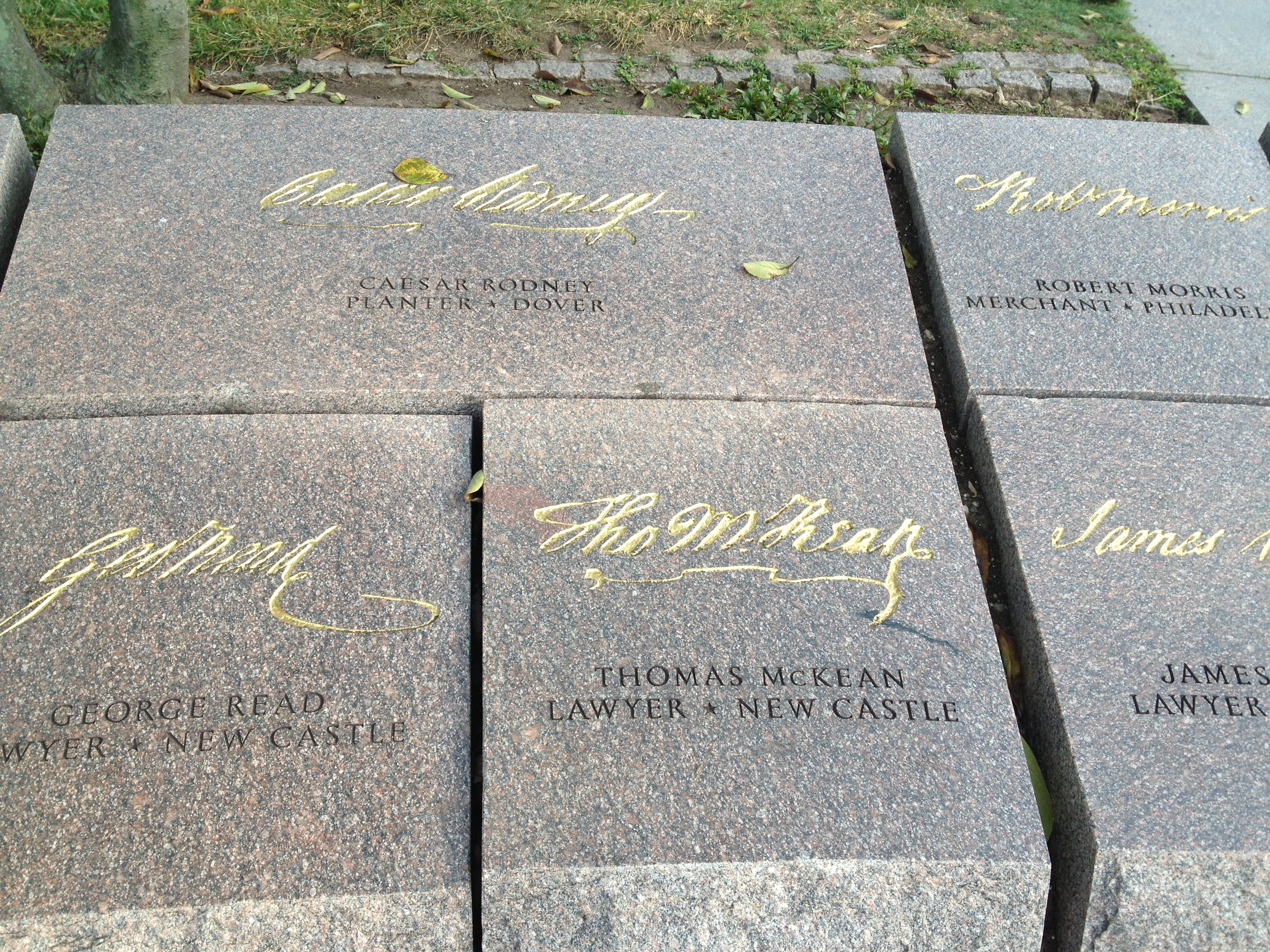
The Memorial to the 56 Signers of the Declaration of Independence in Washington, D.C., McKean's depicted signature is centered, bottom

McKean was a member of the Pennsylvania Society of the Cincinnati in 1785 and was subsequently its vice president.

McKean was also bestowed honorary LL.D. degrees (a) in 1781 by College of New Jersey (later renamed Princeton University), (b) in 1782 by Dartmouth College, and (c) in 1785 by his alma mater, University of Pennsylvania.

With University of Pennsylvania law professor James Wilson (Founding Father), McKean published "Commentaries on the Constitution of the United States" in 1790.

McKean died in Philadelphia and was buried in the First Presbyterian Church Cemetery there. In 1843, his body was moved to Laurel Hill Cemetery.

McKean County, Pennsylvania is named in his honor, as is Thomas McKean High School in New Castle County, also McKean Street in Philadelphia, and the McKean Hall dormitory at the University of Delaware. Penn State University also has a residence hall and a campus road named for him.

Oddly, the name of "Keap Street" in Brooklyn, New York, is the result of an erroneous effort to name a street after him. Many Brooklyn streets are named after signers of the Declaration of Independence, and "Keap Street" is the result of planners being unable to accurately read his signature. In some accounts the "M" of McKean was mistaken for a middle initial, and the flourish on the "n" in McKean led to the n being misread as a "p".

McKean was over six feet tall, and he typically wore a large cocked hat and carried a gold-headed cane. He was a man of quick temper and vigorous personality, "with a thin face, hawk nose and hot eyes." John Adams described him as "one of the three men in the Continental Congress who appeared to me to see more clearly to the end of the business than any others in the body." As chief justice and governor of Pennsylvania he was frequently the center of controversy.

== In popular culture ==
In the 1969 Broadway musical, 1776, McKean is portrayed as a gun-toting cantankerous old Scot who cannot get along with the wealthy and conservative planter George Read. In truth, McKean and Read belonged to opposing political factions in Delaware, but McKean was not a Scottish immigrant. His parents were Irish Presbyterians (referred to as "Scotch-Irish" in America and "Ulster Scots" by a minority in Northern Ireland). His surname is pronounced mc-CANE but was mispronounced as mc-KEEN in the film adaptation of the musical. McKean was portrayed by Bruce MacKay in the original Broadway cast and Ray Middleton in the 1972 film version.

== Almanac ==
Delaware elections were held October 1, and members of the General Assembly took office on October 20 or the following weekday. State Assemblymen had a one-year term. The whole General Assembly chose the Continental Congressmen for a one-year term and the State President for a three-year term. Judges of the Courts of Common Pleas were also selected by the General Assembly for the life of the person appointed. McKean served as state president only temporarily, filling the vacancy created by John McKinly's capture and resignation and awaiting the arrival of George Read.

Pennsylvania elections were held in October as well. The Pennsylvania Supreme Executive Council was created in 1776 and counsellors were popularly elected for three-year terms. A joint ballot of the Pennsylvania General Assembly and the council chose the president from among the twelve counsellors for a one-year term. The chief justice of the Pennsylvania Supreme Court was also selected by the General Assembly and Council for the life of the person appointed.

Public Offices
Office	State	Type	Location	Began office	Ended office	notes
Assemblyman	Lower Counties	Legislature	New Castle	October 20, 1763	October 20, 1764	
Assemblyman	Lower Counties	Legislature	New Castle	October 20, 1764	October 21, 1765	
Judge	Lower Counties	Judiciary	New Castle	1765	1774	Court of Common Pleas
Delegate	Lower Counties	Legislature	New York	October 7, 1765	October 19, 1765	Stamp Act Congress
Assemblyman	Lower Counties	Legislature	New Castle	October 21, 1765	October 20, 1766	
Assemblyman	Lower Counties	Legislature	New Castle	October 20, 1766	October 20, 1767	
Assemblyman	Lower Counties	Legislature	New Castle	October 20, 1767	October 20, 1768	
Assemblyman	Lower Counties	Legislature	New Castle	October 20, 1768	October 20, 1769	
Assemblyman	Lower Counties	Legislature	New Castle	October 20, 1769	October 20, 1770	
Assemblyman	Lower Counties	Legislature	New Castle	October 20, 1770	October 21, 1771	
Assemblyman	Lower Counties	Legislature	New Castle	October 21, 1771	October 20, 1772	
Assemblyman	Lower Counties	Legislature	New Castle	October 20, 1772	October 20, 1773	Speaker
Assemblyman	Lower Counties	Legislature	New Castle	October 20, 1773	October 20, 1774	
Delegate	Lower Counties	Legislature	Philadelphia	September 5, 1774	October 26, 1774	Continental Congress
Assemblyman	Lower Counties	Legislature	New Castle	October 20, 1774	October 20, 1775	
Delegate	Lower Counties	Legislature	Philadelphia	May 10, 1775	October 21, 1775	Continental Congress
Assemblyman	Lower Counties	Legislature	New Castle	October 20, 1775	June 15, 1776	
Delegate	Lower Counties	Legislature	Philadelphia	October 21, 1775	November 7, 1776	Continental Congress
Delegate	Delaware	Convention	Dover	August 27, 1776	September 21, 1776	State Constitution
State Representative	Delaware	Legislature	New Castle	October 28, 1776	September 22, 1777	Speaker
Chief Justice	Pennsylvania	Judiciary	Philadelphia	July 28, 1777	December 17, 1799	State Supreme Court
State President	Delaware	Executive	New Castle	September 22, 1777	October 20, 1777	Acting
Delegate	Delaware	Legislature	York	December 17, 1777	June 27, 1778	Continental Congress
Delegate	Delaware	Legislature	Philadelphia	July 2, 1778	January 18, 1779	Continental Congress
State Representative	Delaware	Legislature	Dover	October 20, 1778	October 20, 1779	
Delegate	Delaware	Legislature	Philadelphia	January 18, 1779	December 22, 1779	Continental Congress
Delegate	Delaware	Legislature	Philadelphia	December 24, 1779	February 10, 1781	Continental Congress
Delegate	Delaware	Legislature	Philadelphia	February 10, 1781	March 1, 1781	Continental Congress
President	Delaware	Legislature	Philadelphia	March 1, 1781	November 4, 1781	Confederation Congress
Delegate	Delaware	Legislature	Philadelphia	November 5, 1781	February 2, 1782	Confederation Congress
Delegate	Delaware	Legislature	Philadelphia	February 2, 1782	November 2, 1782	Confederation Congress
Delegate	Delaware	Legislature	Philadelphia	November 4, 1782	February 1, 1783	Confederation Congress
Delegate	Pennsylvania	Convention	Philadelphia	1789	1790	State Constitution
Governor	Pennsylvania	Executive	Philadelphia	December 17, 1799	December 15, 1802	
Governor	Pennsylvania	Executive	Philadelphia	December 15, 1802	December 18, 1805	
Governor	Pennsylvania	Executive	Philadelphia	December 18, 1805	December 20, 1808	

Delaware General Assembly service
Dates	Assembly	Chamber	Majority	Governor	Committees	District
1776/77	1st	State House	non-partisan	John McKinly	Speaker	New Castle at-large
1778/79	3rd	State House	non-partisan	Caesar Rodney		New Castle at-large

Election results
Year	Office	State	Subject	Party	Votes	%	Opponent	Party	Votes	%
1799	Governor	Pennsylvania	Thomas McKean	Republican	38,036	54%	James Ross	Federalist	32,641	46%
1802	Governor	Pennsylvania	Thomas McKean	Republican	47,879	83%	James Ross	Federalist	9,499	17%
1805	Governor	Pennsylvania	Thomas McKean	Independent	43,644	53%	Simon Snyder	Republican	38,438	47%

== See also ==
- Memorial to the 56 Signers of the Declaration of Independence

Political offices
Preceded by John McKinly	President of Delaware; 1777	Succeeded by George Read
Preceded by Samuel Huntington	President of the Continental Congress; 1781	Succeeded by John Hanson as President of the Confederation Congress
Preceded by Thomas Mifflin	Governor of Pennsylvania; 1799–1808	Succeeded by Simon Snyder
Party political offices
Preceded by Thomas Mifflin	Democratic-Republican nominee for Governor of Pennsylvania; 1799, 1802	Succeeded by Simon Snyder
