= Lurgan Township, Pennsylvania =

Township in Pennsylvania, US

Coordinates: 40°02′36″N 77°34′59″W

Lurgan Township, Franklin County, Pennsylvania
- Township
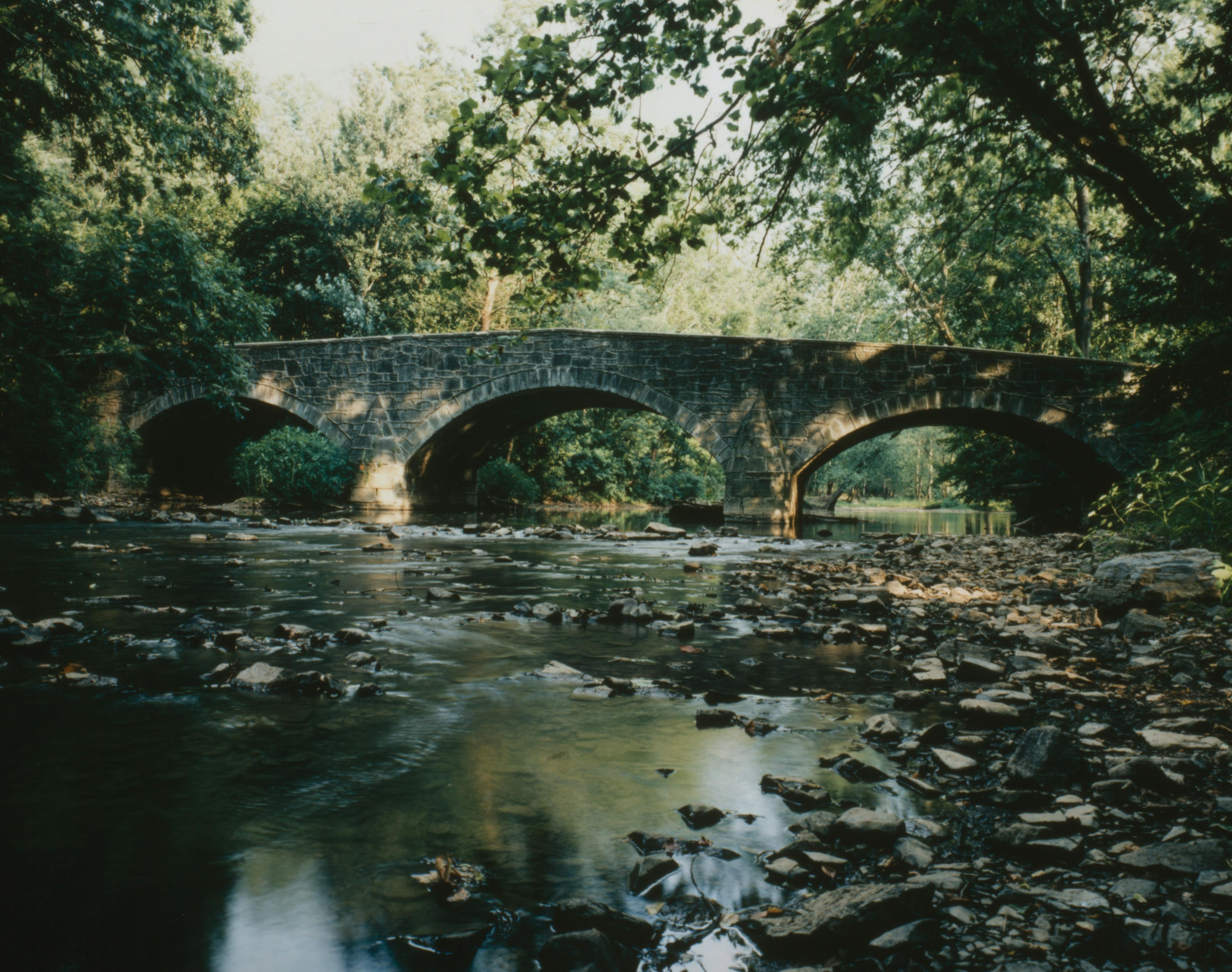
- Western McClay Twin Bridge

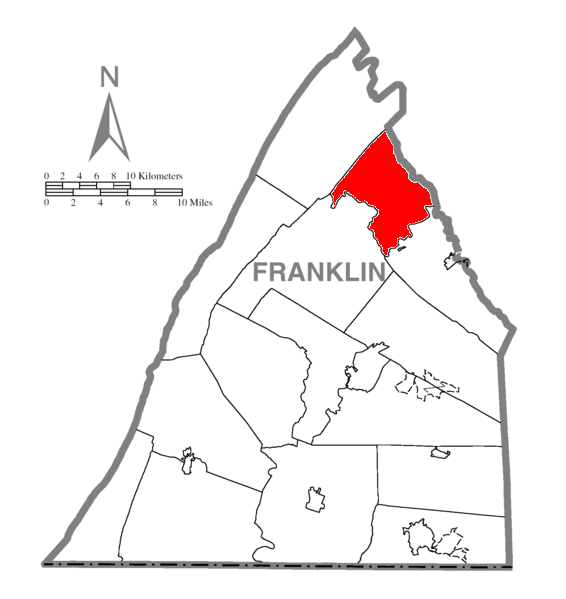
- Map of Franklin County, Pennsylvania highlighting Lurgan Township

- Map of Franklin County, Pennsylvania
- Country: United States
- State: Pennsylvania
- County: Franklin
- Settled: 1736
- Incorporated: 1743

Area
  - Total: 32.83 sq mi (85.03 km^{2})
  - Land: 32.72 sq mi (84.74 km^{2})
  - Water: 0.11 sq mi (0.29 km^{2})

Population (2020)
  - Total: 2,207
  - Estimate (2016): 2,179
  - Density: 66.6/sq mi (25.71/km^{2})
- Time zone: UTC-5 (Eastern (EST))
  - Summer (DST): UTC-4 (EDT)
- Area code: 717
- FIPS code: 42-055-45496
- Website: www.lurgantownship.org

Lurgan Township is a township in Franklin County, Pennsylvania, United States. The population was 2,207 at the 2020 census.

It was named after the town of Lurgan in Northern Ireland.

== History ==
The McClay's Twin Bridge (East) and McClay's Twin Bridge (West) were listed on the National Register of Historic Places in 1988. The bridges are near the site of Maclay's Mill. A Pennsylvania State Historic Marker to commemorate John Maclay, who built the mill in 1786, will be installed. John Maclay was a local soldier and politician, who represented Cumberland County at the Pennsylvania Provincial Conference in June 1776.

== Geography ==
Lurgan Township is in northeastern Franklin County, bordered to the northeast by Cumberland County. The southeastern two-thirds of the township are in the Cumberland Valley, while the northwestern third is in the Ridge and Valley Province of the Appalachian Mountains. Conodoguinet Creek, a tributary of the Susquehanna River, forms the southern boundary of the township, while the northwestern boundary follows the crest of Kittatinny Mountain. Blue Mountain runs parallel to and east of Kittatinny Mountain through the township.

Interstate 76, the Pennsylvania Turnpike, crosses the northern part of the township, with access from Exit 201, the Blue Mountain Interchange. West of the interchange, the turnpike passes through the Blue Mountain Tunnel and Kittatinny Mountain Tunnel in rapid succession. The largest community in the township is Roxbury, in the southwest. Other unincorporated communities are McKinney, Otterbein, Mowersville, and Lurgan.

According to the United States Census Bureau, the township has a total area of 32.8 square miles (85.0 km^{2}), of which 32.7 square miles (84.7 km^{2}) is land and 0.1 square miles (0.3 km^{2}), or 0.34%, is water.

=== Neighboring Townships ===
- Fannett Township (northwest)
- Hopewell Township (Cumberland County), (northeast)
- Letterkenny Township (southwest)
- Southampton Township (southeast)

== Communities ==
- Lurgan
- McKinney
- Mowersville
- Otterbein
- Roxbury

== Demographics ==
Historical population
Census	Pop.	Note	%±
2000	2,014		—
2010	2,151		6.8%
2020	2,207		2.6%
2016 (est.)	2,179		1.3%
U.S. Decennial Census

As of the census of 2000, there were 2,014 people, 710 households, and 572 families residing in the township. The population density was 61.4 inhabitants per square mile (23.7/km^{2}). There were 749 housing units at an average density of 22.8/sq mi (8.8/km^{2}). The racial makeup of the township was 98.76% White, 0.10% African American, 0.05% Native American, 0.20% Asian, 0.05% Pacific Islander, 0.35% from other races, and 0.50% from two or more races. Hispanic or Latino of any race were 0.50% of the population.

There were 710 households, out of which 36.6% had children under the age of 18 living with them, 71.8% were married couples living together, 5.2% had a female householder with no husband present, and 19.4% were non-families. 15.9% of all households were made up of individuals, and 6.6% had someone living alone who was 65 years of age or older. The average household size was 2.84 and the average family size was 3.18.

In the township the population was spread out, with 28.4% under the age of 18, 9.1% from 18 to 24, 28.4% from 25 to 44, 23.6% from 45 to 64, and 10.6% who were 65 years of age or older. The median age was 34 years. For every 100 females there were 104.9 males. For every 100 females age 18 and over, there were 102.7 males.

The median income for a household in the township was $41,681, and the median income for a family was $46,964. Males had a median income of $31,366 versus $25,469 for females. The per capita income for the township was $17,276. About 4.0% of families and 7.7% of the population were below the poverty line, including 11.6% of those under age 18 and 11.2% of those age 65 or over.
