= McClay's Twin Bridge (East) =

- Maclay's Twin Bridge (East)
- U.S. National Register of Historic Places
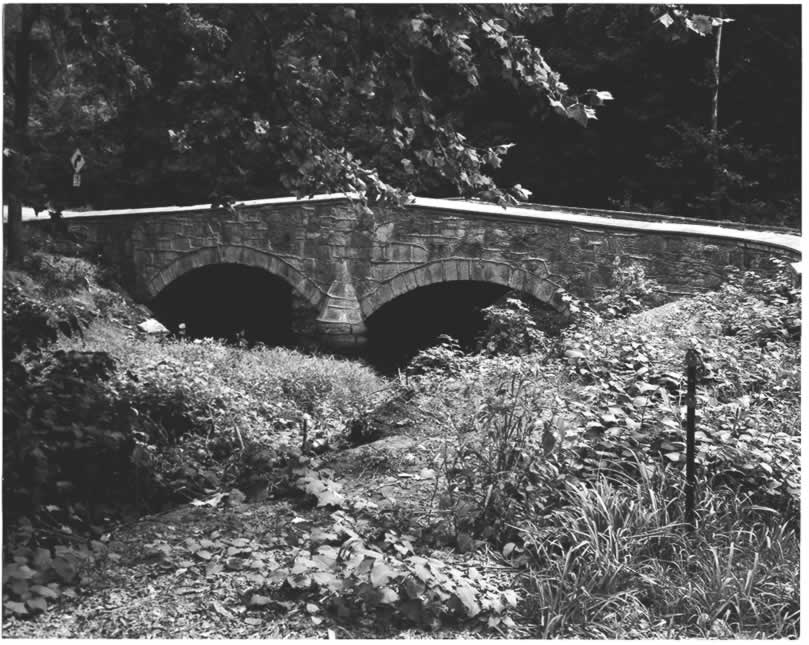
- Maclay's Twin Bridge (East), 1982

- Location within Pennsylvania Location within the United States
- Location: Legislative Route 28010 over a tributary of Conodoguinet Creek, near Middle Spring, Lurgan Township and Southampton Township, Pennsylvania
- Coordinates: 40°5′49″N 77°34′13″W
- Area: less than one acre
- Built: 1827
- Built by: Silas Harry
- Architectural style: Multi-span camelback arch
- MPS: Highway Bridges Owned by the Commonwealth of Pennsylvania, Department of Transportation TR
- NRHP reference No.: 88000777
- Added to NRHP: June 22, 1988

Maclay's Twin Bridge (East) is a historic multi-span stone arch bridge spanning a tributary of Conodoguinet Creek between Lurgan Township and Southampton Township in Franklin County, Pennsylvania. It is a 105-foot-long (32 m) bridge, with two spans each measuring 20 feet (6.1 m) long. It was constructed in 1827 and is a twin of McClay's Twin Bridge (West).

The bridge was listed on the National Register of Historic Places in 1988.

== See also ==
- List of bridges documented by the Historic American Engineering Record in Pennsylvania
- Maclay's Mill
