= Southampton station =

Southampton station may refer to:

In Southampton, England:

- Southampton Central railway station
- Southampton Airport Parkway railway station
- Southampton Terminus railway station (closed)
- Southampton West End railway station (closed)

In the United States:

- Southampton (LIRR station), in Southampton, New York, USA
- Southampton station (Pennsylvania), a former railroad station in Southampton, Pennsylvania, USA

== See also ==
- Southampton (disambiguation)
