= Ramp Covered Bridge =

- U.S. National Register of Historic Places
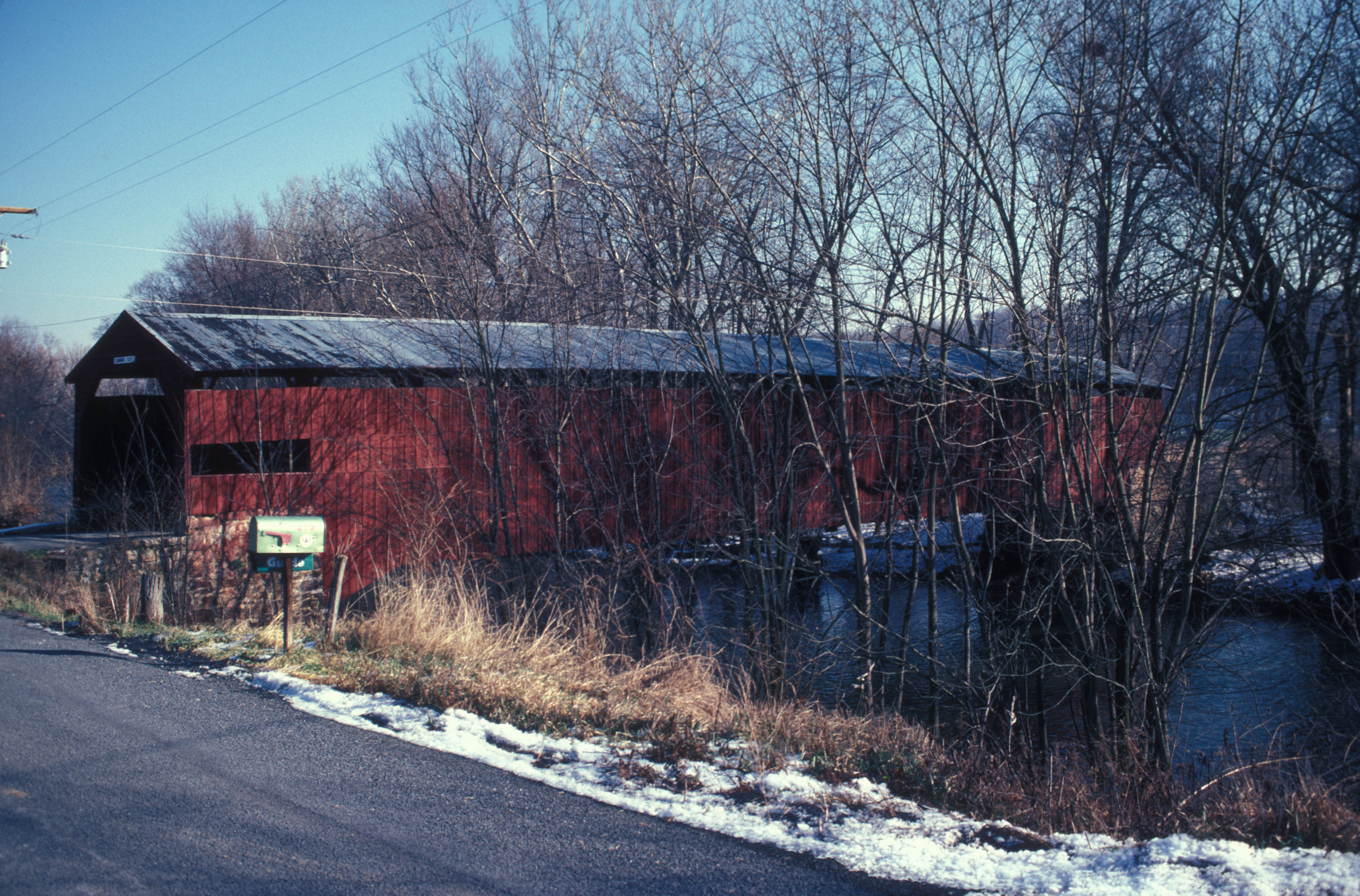

- Location within Pennsylvania Location within the United States
- Location: East of Newburg on Township 374, Hopewell Township, Pennsylvania
- Coordinates: 40°8′10″N 77°31′26″W
- Area: 0.1 acres (0.040 ha)
- Built: 1870
- Architectural style: Burr Arch Truss
- MPS: Covered Bridges of Adams, Cumberland, and Perry Counties TR
- NRHP reference No.: 80003480
- Added to NRHP: August 25, 1980

The Ramp Covered Bridge is a historic wooden covered bridge located at Hopewell Township in Cumberland County, Pennsylvania. It is a 130-foot-long (40 m), Burr Truss arch bridge constructed in 1870. It crosses the Conodoguinet Creek. It is one of 17 historic covered bridges in Adams, Cumberland, and Perry Counties.

It was listed on the National Register of Historic Places in 1980.
