= 1802 Pennsylvania gubernatorial election =

- October 12, 1802
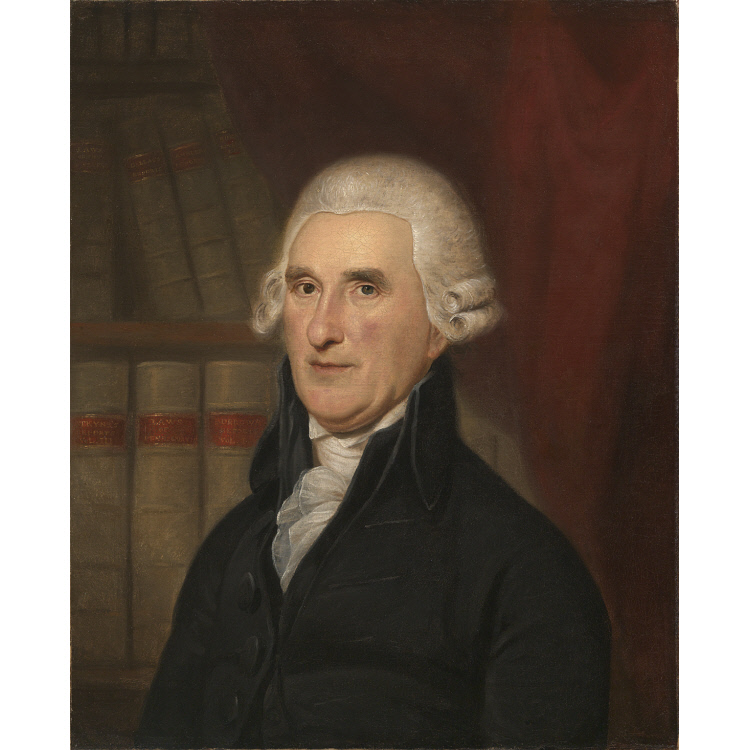

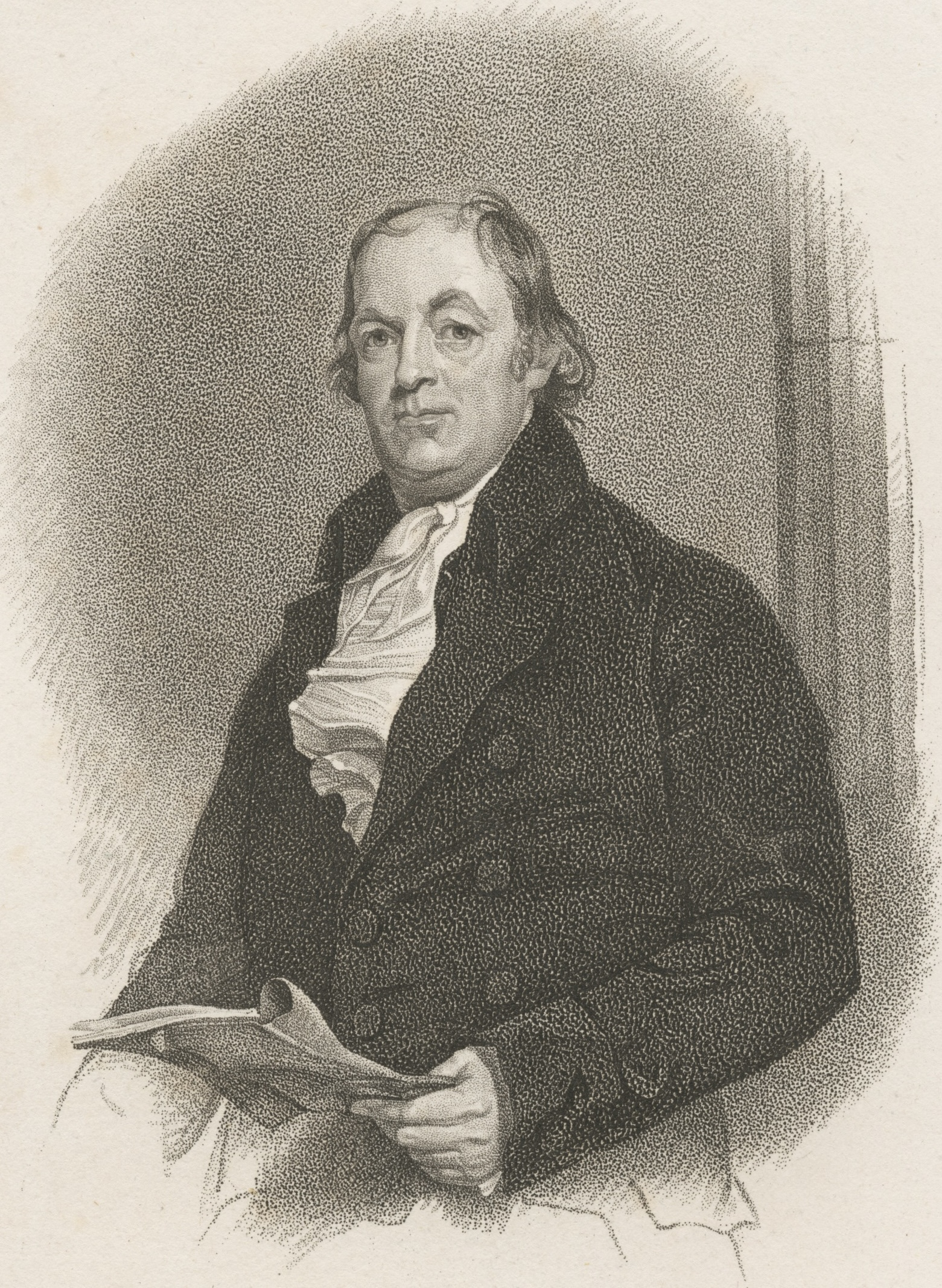
Nominee	Thomas McKean	James Ross
Party	Democratic-Republican	Federalist
Popular vote	47,879	17,037
Percentage	73.65%	26.21%
- County Results; McKean: 50–60% 60–70% 70–80% 80–90% 90–100% Ross: 50–60% 70–80%
Governor before election
Thomas McKean
Democratic-Republican
Elected Governor
Thomas McKean
Democratic-Republican

The 1802 Pennsylvania gubernatorial election occurred on October 12, 1802. Incumbent Democratic-Republican governor Thomas McKean successfully sought re-election to another term. As occurred in his prior campaign, he defeated U.S. Senator James Ross, a Federalist.

== Results ==
Pennsylvania gubernatorial election, 1802
Party	Candidate	Votes	%
Democratic-Republican	Thomas McKean (incumbent)	47,879	73.65
Federalist	James Ross	17,037	26.21
N/A	Others	94	0.15
Total votes		65,010	100.00
