= Lake of the Woods (California) =

Lake in the state of California, United States

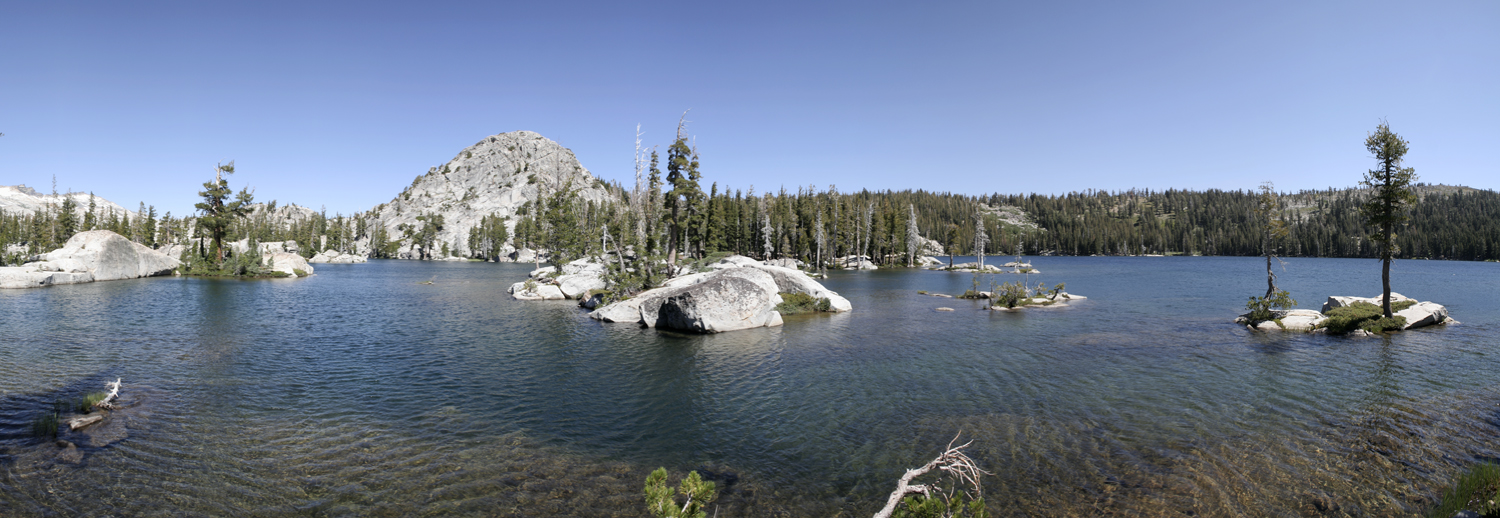

- Location within California Location within the United States
- Location: Desolation Wilderness, El Dorado County, California, US
- Coordinates: 38.8500°N 120.1194°W
- Lake type: Glacial lake
- Primary outflows: Terminal (evaporation)
- Basin countries: United States
- Max. length: .9 km (0.56 mi)
- Max. width: .6 km (0.37 mi)
- Surface elevation: 2,453 m (8,048 ft)
- References: U.S. Geological Survey Geographic Names Information System: Lake of the Woods (California)

The Lake of the Woods is a backcountry glacial lake in the Desolation Wilderness of the Eldorado National Forest, southwest of Lake Tahoe, in El Dorado County, California. It lies just southeast of Lake Aloha.

The lake is accessible by hiking west out of the Glen Alpine Springs Trailhead, Echo Lake (California) Trailhead or north out of the Twin Bridges Trailhead. The lake is known to contain Rainbow Trout and Brook Trout.

== See also ==
- List of lakes in California
