= 1797 United States Senate election in Pennsylvania =

The 1797 United States Senate election in Pennsylvania was held on February 16, 1797. Incumbent James Ross was re-elected by the Pennsylvania General Assembly to the United States Senate.

== Background ==
After Sen. Albert Gallatin was removed from office after his eligibility was successfully challenged, James Ross was elected by the General Assembly, consisting of the Pennsylvania House of Representatives and Pennsylvania State Senate, in 1794 to fill the remainder of the unexpired term, which was to expire on March 4, 1797.

== Results ==
The Pennsylvania General Assembly convened on February 16, 1797, to elect a senator to fill the term beginning on March 4, 1797. The results of the vote of both houses combined are as follows:

State legislature results
Party	Candidate	Votes	%
Federalist	James Ross (Inc.)	56	54.90
Democratic-Republican	William Irvine	38	37.25
N/A	Not voting	8	7.84
Total votes		102	100.00

Preceded by 1794	Pennsylvania U.S. Senate election (Class I); 1797	Succeeded by 1802
