= 1799 Pennsylvania gubernatorial election =

- October 8, 1799
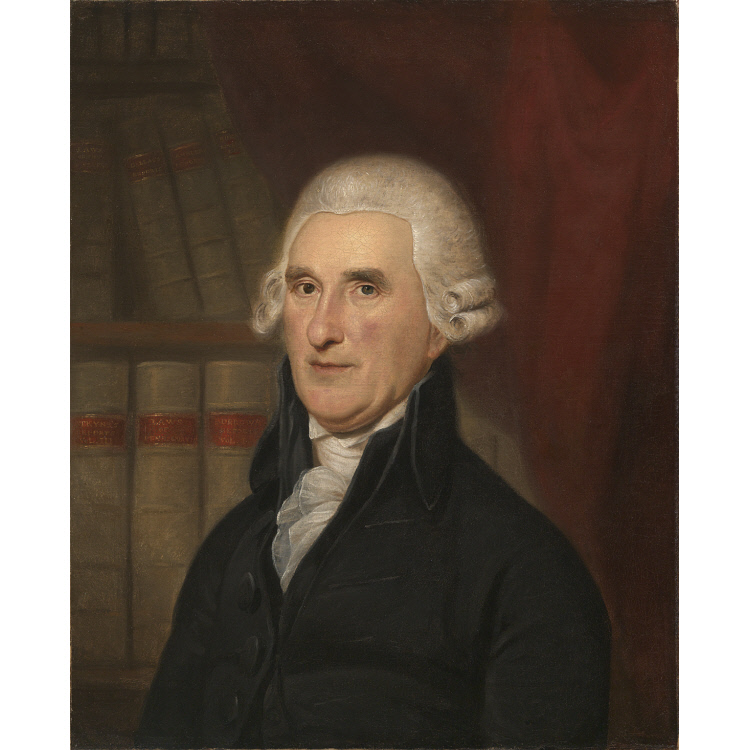

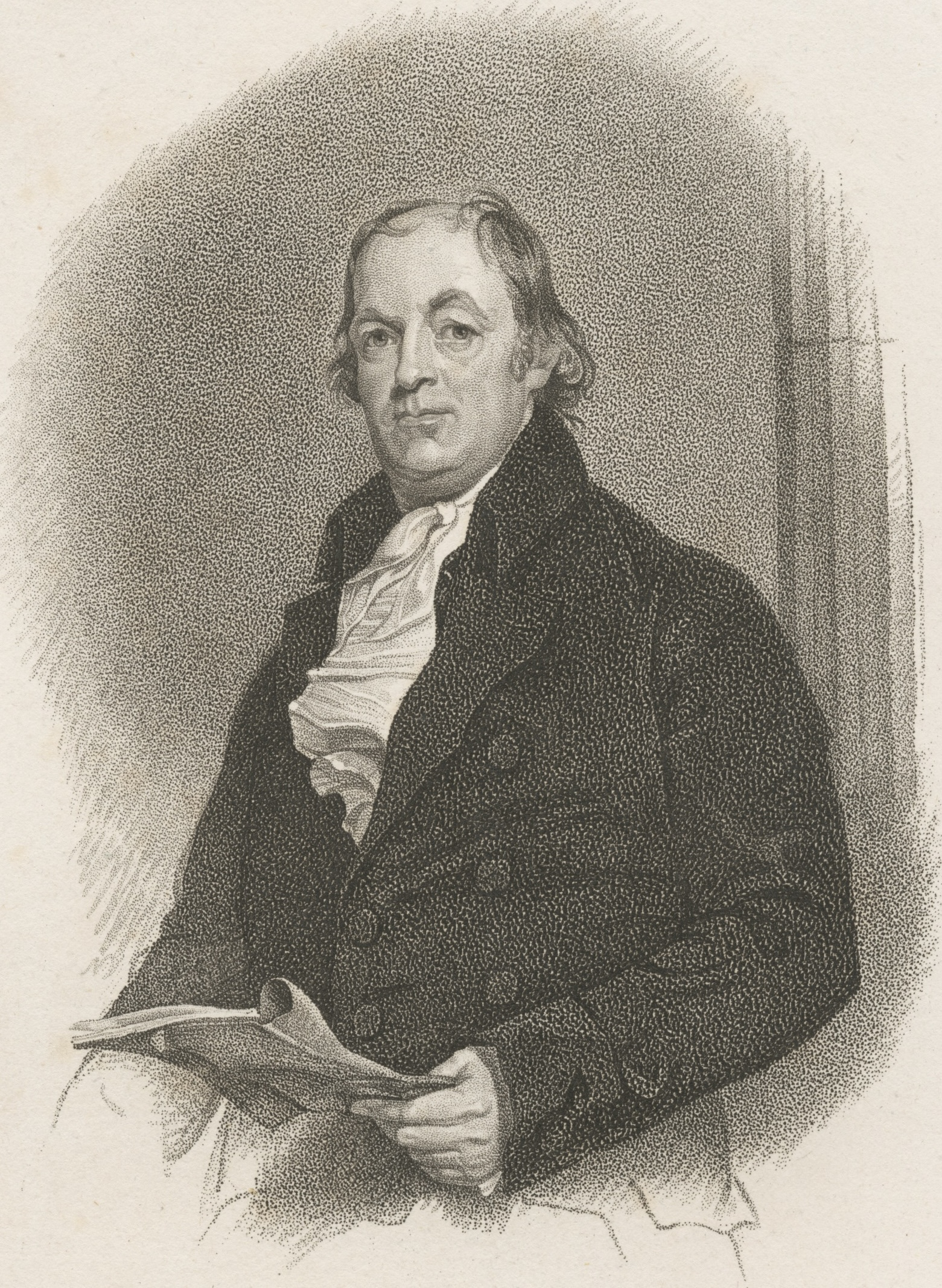
Nominee	Thomas McKean	James Ross
Party	Democratic-Republican	Federalist
Popular vote	38,036	32,641
Percentage	53.82%	46.18%
- County Results; McKean: 50–60% 60–70% 70–80% 80–90% Ross: 50–60% 60–70% 70–80% 80–90%
Governor before election
Thomas Mifflin
Democratic-Republican
Elected Governor
Thomas McKean
Democratic-Republican

The 1799 Pennsylvania gubernatorial election was between two candidates. Incumbent governor Thomas Mifflin was not running. The race was between Federalist U.S. Senator James Ross and Democratic-Republican Thomas McKean. The retired Chief Justice of the Pennsylvania Supreme Court, McKean was a Federalist and a Mifflin ally, as both supported strong state executive power but rejected the domestic policies of the national government.

Some historians have pointed to McKean's victory as a forecast of Thomas Jefferson's election in the 1800 United States presidential election the next year.

== Results ==
Pennsylvania gubernatorial election, 1799
Party	Candidate	Votes	%
Democratic-Republican	Thomas McKean	38,036	53.82
Federalist	James Ross	32,641	46.18
Total votes		70,677	100.00
