= Mainsville, Pennsylvania =

Unincorporated community in Pennsylvania, U.S.

Coordinates: 40°00′54″N 77°30′53″W

Mainsville is an unincorporated community in Southampton Township in Franklin County, in the U.S. state of Pennsylvania.

== History ==
Mainsville was founded ca. the 1860s.
