= South Hampton =

South Hampton may refer to:

- South Hampton, New Hampshire, USA
- South Hampton Roads, Virginia, USA

== See also ==
- Southampton
