= Twin Bridges Airport =

Twin Bridges Airport may refer to:

- Twin Bridges Airport (Idaho) in Ketchum, Idaho, United States (FAA: U61)
- Ruby Valley Field, formerly Twin Bridges Airport, in Twin Bridges, Montana, United States (FAA: 7S1)
