= Hopewell Township, Cumberland County, Pennsylvania =

Township in Pennsylvania, US

Coordinates: 40°07′25″N 77°30′59″W

- Township
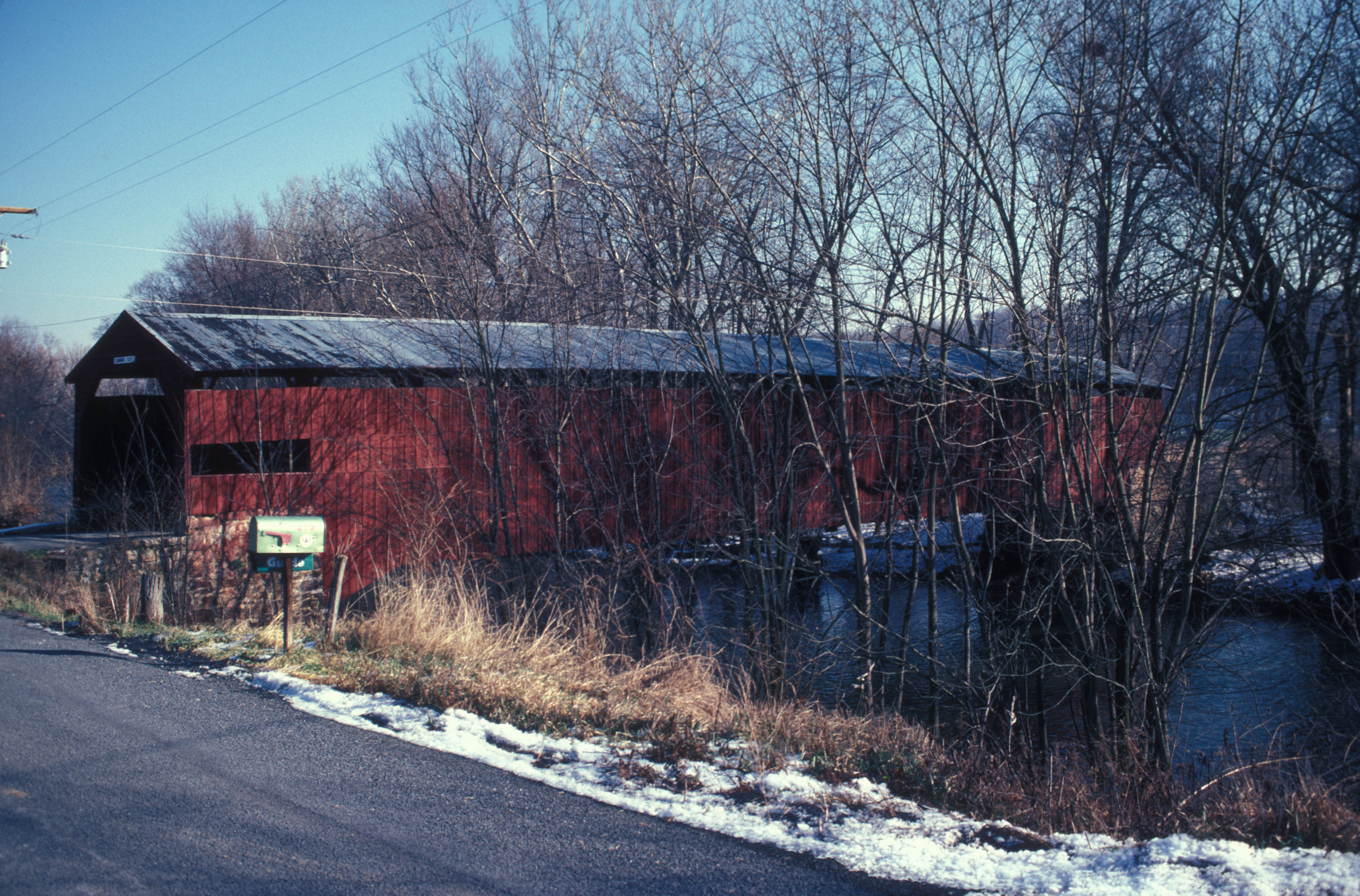
- Ramp Covered Bridge

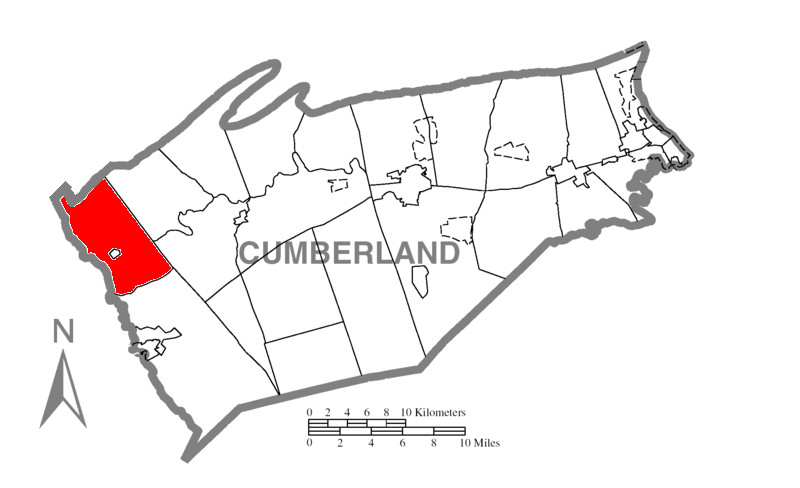
- Map of Cumberland County, Pennsylvania highlighting Hopewell Township

- Map of Cumberland County, Pennsylvania
- Country: United States
- State: Pennsylvania
- County: Cumberland

Government
  - Type: Board of Supervisors

Area
  - Total: 27.83 sq mi (72.07 km^{2})
  - Land: 27.67 sq mi (71.67 km^{2})
  - Water: 0.15 sq mi (0.40 km^{2})

Population (2020)
  - Total: 2,495 ▲
  - Estimate (2023): 2,532
  - Density: 88.4/sq mi (34.13/km^{2})
- Time zone: UTC-5 (Eastern (EST))
  - Summer (DST): UTC-4 (EDT)
- Area code: 717
- FIPS code: 42-041-35672
- Website: hopewelltownshipcc.com

Historical population
Census	Pop.	Note	%±
2000	2,096		—
2010	2,329		11.1%
2020	2,495		7.1%
2023 (est.)	2,532		1.5%
U.S. Decennial Census

Hopewell Township is a township in Cumberland County, Pennsylvania, United States. The population was 2,495 at the 2020 census, up from 2,329 at the 2010 census.

== History ==
The Ramp Covered Bridge was added to the National Register of Historic Places in 1980.

== Geography ==
Hopewell Township is in the northwestern corner of Cumberland County, bordered to the north by Perry County and to the west by Franklin County. The crest of Blue Mountain forms the Perry County boundary. The township surrounds the borough of Newburg, a separate municipality. Conodoguinet Creek flows from southwest to northeast across the southern part of the township.

Interstate 76, the Pennsylvania Turnpike, crosses the northern part of the township from east to west, with access from Exit 201 just to the west in Lurgan Township, Franklin County. From Exit 201 it is 43 miles (69 km) east to Harrisburg, the state capital, and 161 miles (259 km) west to Pittsburgh.

According to the United States Census Bureau, the township has a total area of 27.8 square miles (72.1 km^{2}), of which 27.7 square miles (71.7 km^{2}) is land and 0.15 square miles (0.4 km^{2}), or 0.56%, is water.

== Demographics ==
As of the census of 2000, there were 2,096 people, 688 households, and 601 families residing in the township. The population density was 74.6 inhabitants per square mile (28.8/km^{2}). There were 706 housing units at an average density of 25.1 units per square mile (9.7 units/km^{2}). The racial makeup of the township was 97.95% White, 0.72% African American, 0.52% Asian, 0.05% Pacific Islander, 0.14% from other races, and 0.62% from two or more races. Hispanic or Latino of any race were 0.72% of the population.

There were 688 households, out of which 40.4% had children under the age of 18 living with them, 78.2% were married couples living together, 5.4% had a female householder with no husband present, and 12.6% were non-families. 10.2% of all households were made up of individuals, and 4.4% had someone living alone who was 65 years of age or older. The average household size was 3.02 and the average family size was 3.23.

In the township the population was spread out, with 29.8% under the age of 18, 7.9% from 18 to 24, 27.7% from 25 to 44, 24.1% from 45 to 64, and 10.5% who were 65 years of age or older. The median age was 35 years. For every 100 females there were 99.1 males. For every 100 females age 18 and over, there were 98.2 males.

The median income for a household in the township was $44,118, and the median income for a family was $47,143. Males had a median income of $31,094 versus $24,583 for females. The per capita income for the township was $18,114. About 3.8% of families and 6.2% of the population were below the poverty line, including 8.6% of those under age 18 and 7.0% of those age 65 or over.
