= Southampton Township, Franklin County, Pennsylvania =

Township in Pennsylvania, US

Coordinates: 40°03′00″N 77°34′59″W

- Township
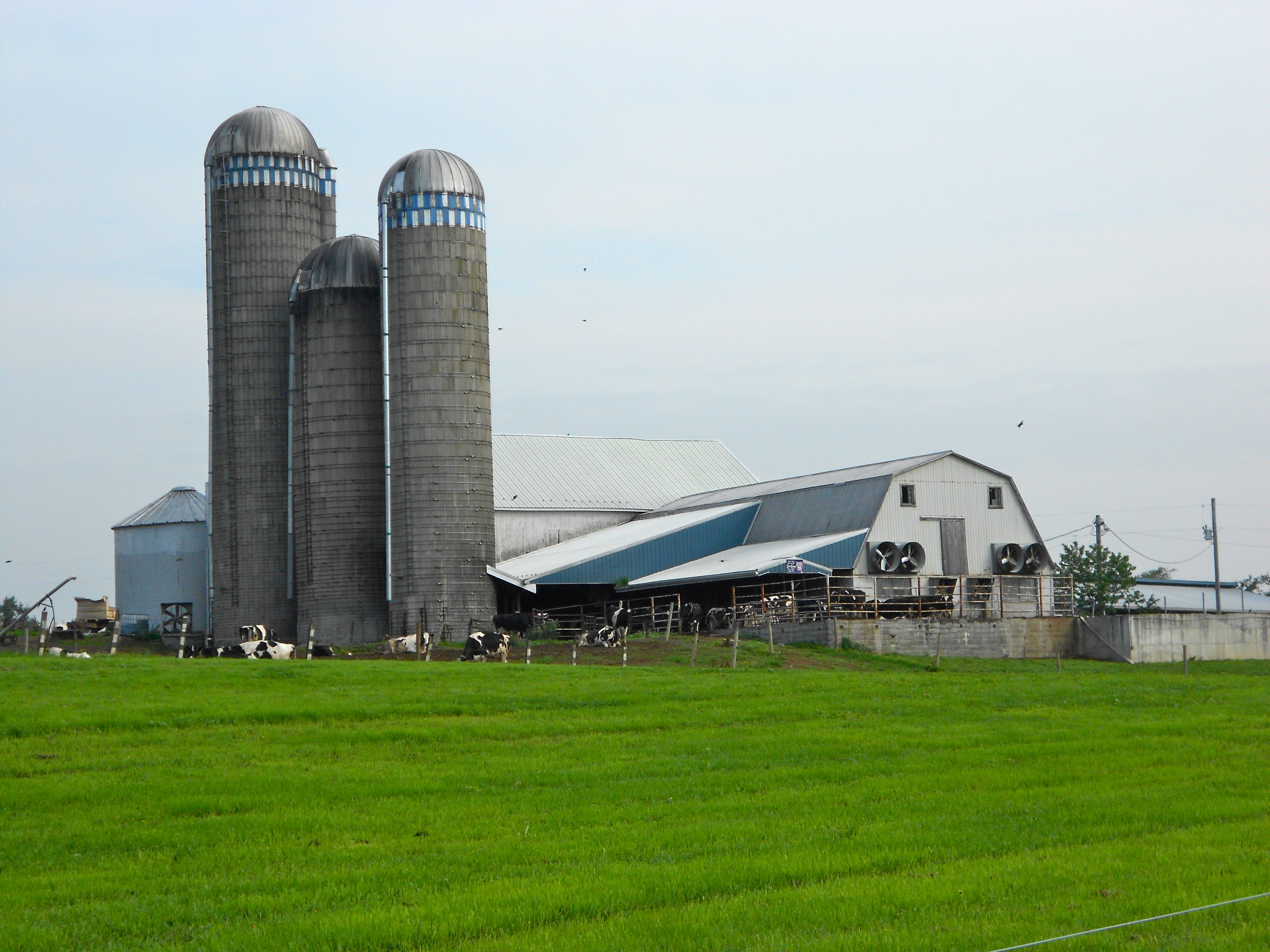
- Barn off Orrstown Road

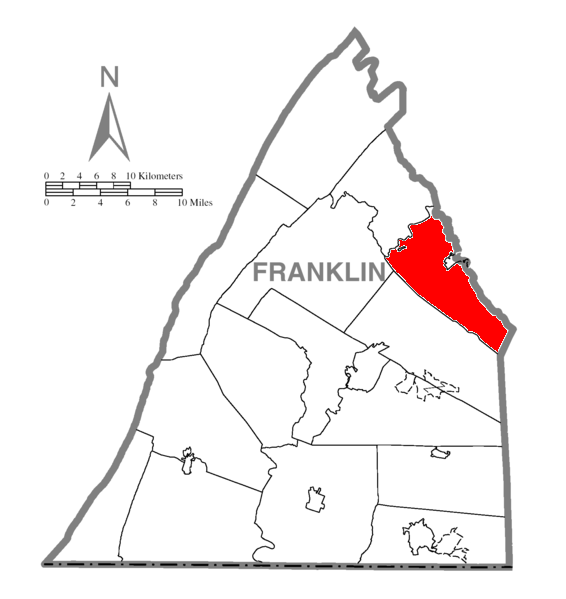
- Map of Franklin County, Pennsylvania highlighting Southampton Township

- Map of Franklin County, Pennsylvania
- Country: United States
- State: Pennsylvania
- County: Franklin
- Incorporated: 1783

Area
  - Total: 38.24 sq mi (99.04 km^{2})
  - Land: 38.23 sq mi (99.02 km^{2})
  - Water: 0.0077 sq mi (0.02 km^{2})

Population (2020)
  - Total: 8,566
  - Estimate (2016): 8,519
  - Density: 222.8/sq mi (86.04/km^{2})
- Time zone: UTC-5 (Eastern (EST))
  - Summer (DST): UTC-4 (EDT)
- Area code: 717
- FIPS code: 42-055-71912
- Website: www.southamptontownship.org

Southampton Township is a township that is located in Franklin County, Pennsylvania, United States. The population was 8,566 at the time of the 2020 census, an increase from the figure of 6,138 that was documented by the 2000 census.

== History ==
This American township was named after Southampton, England.

== Geography ==
This township is located in northeastern Franklin County and is bordered to the northeast by Cumberland County and the borough of Shippensburg.

The borough of Orrstown is surrounded by the northwestern part of the township, but like Shippensburg is a separate municipality. The county/township boundary follows Mains Run, Gum Run, and Middle Spring Creek, a tributary of Conodoguinet Creek and part of the Susquehanna River watershed.

A separate Southampton Township lies directly adjacent in Cumberland County.

Most of Southampton Township (Franklin County) is situated in the Cumberland Valley, but the southeastern end of the township extends up onto South Mountain, where the highest elevation in the township reaches 2,100 feet (640 m) on Big Pine Flat Ridge. The Appalachian Trail traverses South Mountain through the township.

According to the United States Census Bureau, the township has a total area of 38.2 square miles (99.0 km^{2}), of which 0.01 square miles (0.02 km^{2}), or 0.02%, is water.

=== Neighboring Townships ===
- Greene Township (south)
- Hopewell Township (Cumberland County), (northeast)
- Letterkenny Township (west)
- Lurgan Township (northwest)
- Southampton Township (Cumberland County) (east)

== Communities ==
- Mainsville
- Mongul
- Pinola

== Demographics ==
Historical population
Census	Pop.	Note	%±
2000	6,138		—
2010	7,987		30.1%
2020	8,566		7.2%
2016 (est.)	8,519		6.7%
U.S. Decennial Census

As of the census of 2000, there were 6,138 people, 2,271 households, and 1,741 families residing in the township.

The population density was 161.5 inhabitants per square mile (62.4/km^{2}). There were 2,359 housing units at an average density of 62.1 per square mile (24.0/km^{2}).

The racial makeup of the township was 96.73% White, 1.47% African American, 0.13% Native American, 0.52% Asian, 0.03% Pacific Islander, 0.13% from other races, and 0.99% from two or more races. Hispanic or Latino of any race were 0.64% of the population.

There were 2,271 households, out of which 37.2% had children under the age of 18 living with them, 64.4% were married couples living together, 8.9% had a female householder with no husband present, and 23.3% were non-families. 19.5% of all households were made up of individuals, and 8.2% had someone living alone who was 65 years of age or older.

The average household size was 2.70 and the average family size was 3.09.

Within the township, the population was spread out, with 29.0% under the age of 18, 7.4% from 18 to 24, 28.3% from 25 to 44, 22.8% from 45 to 64, and 12.5% who were 65 years of age or older. The median age was 35 years.

For every 100 females, there were 94.0 males. For every 100 females aged 18 and over, there were 91.2 males.

The median income for a household in the township was $42,266, and the median income for a family was $46,339. Males had a median income of $31,199 versus $22,473 for females.

The per capita income for the township was $16,981.

Approximately 5.5% of families and 8.9% of the population were living below the poverty line, including 11.5% of those under age 18 and 13.3% of those age 65 or over.

== Transportation ==
Interstate 81 and U.S. Route 11, running in parallel, cross the center of the township. I-81 leads northeast to Carlisle and southwest to Hagerstown, Maryland, and has one interchange (Exit 24) in the township. US-11, the local highway, passes northeast through Shippensburg and southwest through Chambersburg, the Franklin County seat, while also leading to the more distant destinations on I-81.
