= Mowersville, Pennsylvania =

Unincorporated community in Pennsylvania, U.S.

Coordinates: 40°06′43″N 77°34′55″W

Mowersville is an unincorporated community in Lurgan Township in northern Franklin County, in the U.S. state of Pennsylvania.

== History ==
A post office called Mowersville was established in 1868, and remained in operation until 1955. The community was named after Joseph Mower, a first settler.
