= Twin Bridges trailhead =

Trail in Strawberry, California

Coordinates: 38.811687°N 120.123634°W

The Twin Bridges trailhead or Pyramid Creek trailhead is located off U.S. Route 50 a couple miles east of Strawberry, California, west of Echo Pass.

Some of the destinations most accessed by the trailhead are Horsetail Falls (1 mi) and Ropi Lake (1.75 mi) or Lake of the Woods (3 mi) as well as the rest of the Desolation Wilderness. This trailhead offers a commonly accepted route to the summit of Pyramid Peak, although the most popular trailhead to Pyramid Peak is an unmarked trailhead at Rocky Canyon (which is about a mile west of the Pyramid Creek Trailhead). In winter only the first mile is easily accessible as there is very steep exposed terrain after the falls.
