= Maclay's Mill =

Former historic mill in Pennsylvania

Coordinates: 40.0967°N 77.5707°W

Maclay's Mill is the former site of a grist mill located approximately 4 miles (6.4 km) from Shippensburg, Pennsylvania along the Conodoguinet Creek.

Maclay's Mill

== History ==
Maclay's Mill was built along the area near the Conodoguinet Creek which was first settled in 1742 by Charles Maclay, Sr., who had arrived in America eight years prior. The mill was built around 1786 by Charles' son John Maclay. John Maclay was a local magistrate and a delegate from Cumberland County to the Pennsylvania Provincial Conference in June 1776. Although there is controversy as to the date, one family narrative includes a legend that the mill race leading to John Maclay's grist mill was dug by Hessian prisoners of war during the American Revolution. The mill lasted seven generations until it was dismantled in 1918 after being sold to Clarence Stouffer. Over its lifetime the mill was the childhood home of two United States Senators, William Maclay (politician) and Samuel Maclay, this also being the birthplace of the latter of the two.

== See also ==
- McClay's Twin Bridge (East)
- McClay's Twin Bridge (West)
