= James Ross (Pennsylvania politician) =

American politician and lawyer

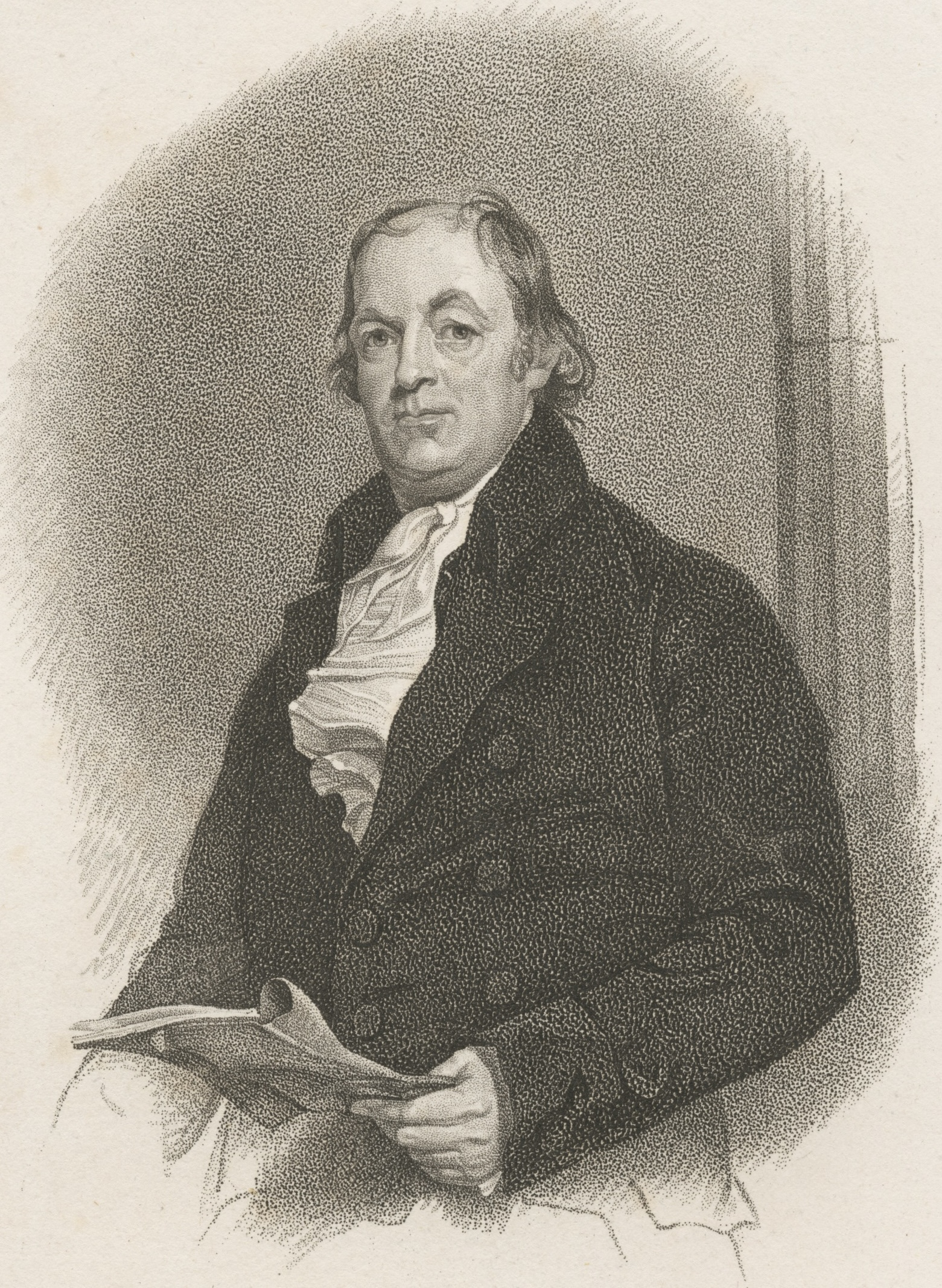
- Engraving by Charles Goodman & Robert Piggot after Thomas Sully

President pro tempore of the United States Senate
- In office March 1, 1799 – December 1, 1799
- Preceded by: John Laurance
- Succeeded by: Samuel Livermore

United States Senator from Pennsylvania
- In office April 24, 1794 – March 4, 1803
- Preceded by: Albert Gallatin
- Succeeded by: Samuel Maclay

Personal details
- Born: July 12, 1762 Delta, Province of Pennsylvania
- Died: November 27, 1847 (aged 85) Pittsburgh, Pennsylvania
- Party: Federalist

James Ross (July 12, 1762 – November 27, 1847) was an American politician and lawyer who represented Pennsylvania in the United States Senate from 1794 to 1803. During his tenure, he served as president pro tempore of the United States Senate from March to December 1799.

== Biography ==
Born near Delta, York County, Pennsylvania, he was the son of Joseph and Jane (Graham) Ross. At eighteen, after having received a classical education, he moved to Canonsburg, Pennsylvania and taught at what would become Washington and Jefferson College. He studied law and was admitted to the bar in 1784 focusing on land law. A Federalist, he was a member of the convention that drafted a new constitution for Pennsylvania in 1789–1790. In 1791 Ross was elected to the American Philosophical Society.

President George Washington appointed him to negotiate with the rebels of the Whiskey Rebellion, successfully defusing the situation without violence. On April 1, 1794, the Pennsylvania legislature elected him to the United States Senate to replace Albert Gallatin, who was removed by the legislature. There, he authored a new law for the public lands and fought President Thomas Jefferson's administration. He was elected to a second term in the Senate in 1797.

In 1800, with the 1800 Presidential Election on the horizon, Ross introduced a controversial bill whereby, after the electoral votes were counted in Congress, the ballots would be turned over to a committee chaired by the Chief Justice and consisting of twelve members, six from each house of Congress. The committee, acting behind closed doors, would be able to discard electoral votes deemed fraudulent after investigation. A group of horrified Republican Senators leaked the bill to arch-Republican Philadelphia printer William Duane, who published the contents in his Aurora on February 19, 1800. The Federalists quickly dropped the bill.

On January 15, 1803, amidst the controversies over Spain's revocation of the American right of deposit at New Orleans and French acquisition of Louisiana, Ross moved to afford Jefferson the ability to raise 50,000 troops to seize New Orleans. Jefferson did not want to have to use these troops, but the motion gave United States Minister to France Robert R. Livingston leverage in his negotiations, which resulted in the Louisiana Purchase.

He ran unsuccessfully for Governor of Pennsylvania in 1799, 1802, and 1808.

During the late 1810s he is listed as the Pittsburgh City Council President.

He died in Allegheny, which is now part of Pittsburgh. Ross Street in Downtown Pittsburgh (bordering the Pittsburgh City-County Building and the Allegheny County Courthouse), the Pittsburgh suburb of Ross Township, the Fox Chapel borough street James Ross Place, and Ross County, Ohio, and Ross Township, Jefferson County, Ohio are named in his honor.

== Bibliography ==
- United States Congress. "James Ross (id: R000448)". Biographical Directory of the United States Congress.

Party political offices
Preceded by Frederick Muhlenberg	Federalist nominee for Governor of Pennsylvania; 1799, 1802	Vacant Title next held by Himself
Vacant Title last held by Himself	Federalist nominee for Governor of Pennsylvania; 1808	Succeeded by William Tilghman
U.S. Senate
Preceded by Albert Gallatin	U.S. senator (Class 1) from Pennsylvania; 1794–1803; Served alongside: Robert Morris, William Bingham, J. Peter Muhlenberg, George Logan	Succeeded by Samuel Maclay
Political offices
Preceded by John Laurance	President pro tempore of the United States Senate; March 1, 1799 – December 1, 1799	Succeeded by Samuel Livermore
