= Southampton Township, Cumberland County, Pennsylvania =

Township in Pennsylvania, US

Coordinates: 40°03′00″N 77°27′59″W

- Township
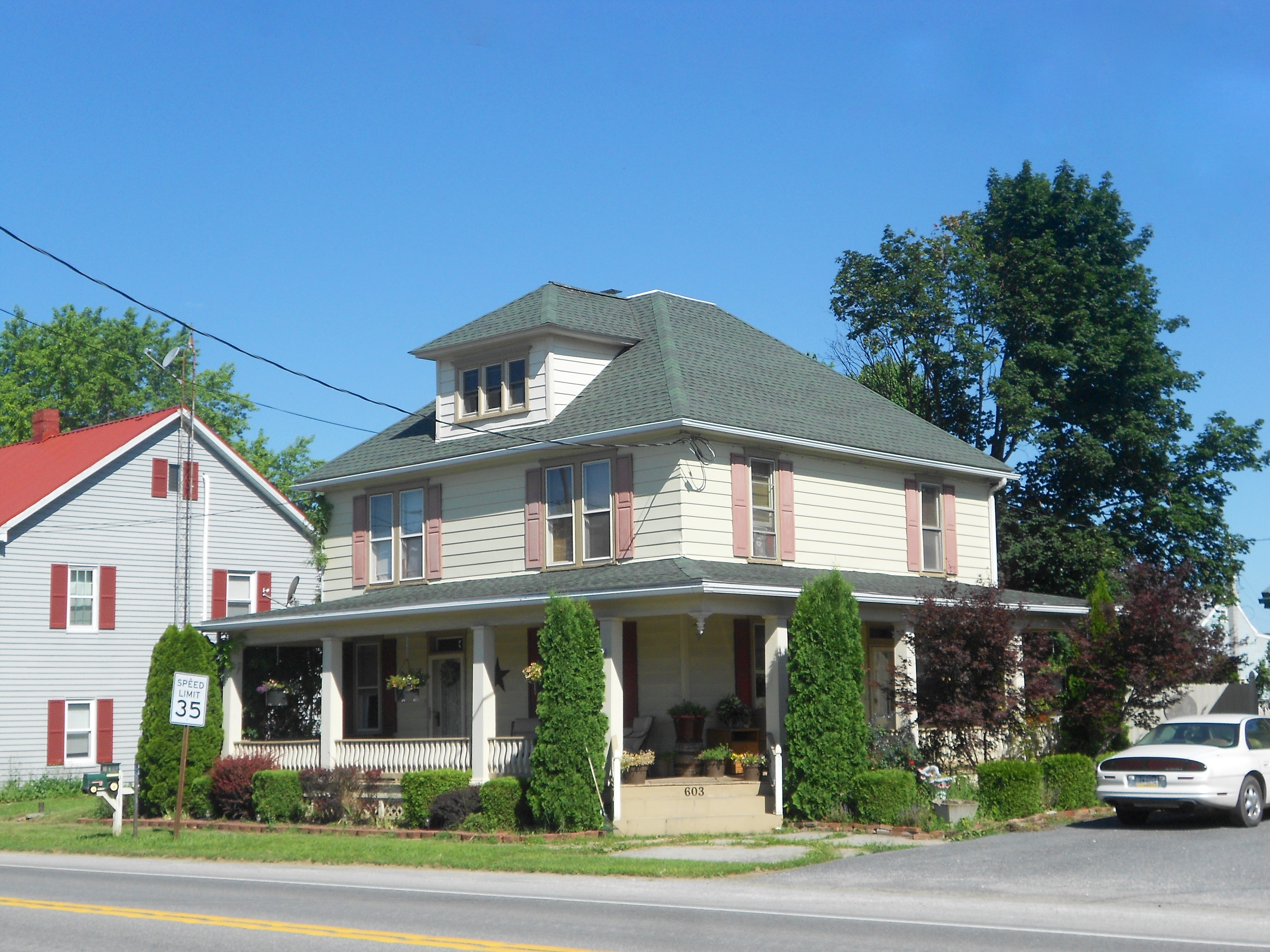
- House in Lee's Cross Roads

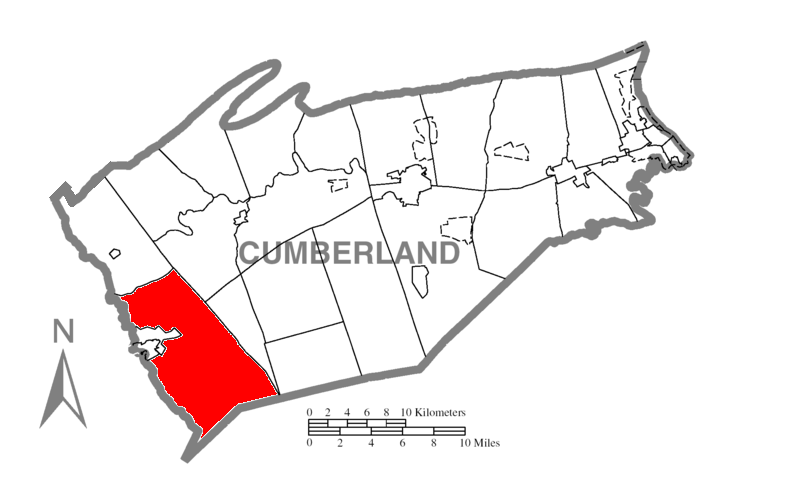
- Map of Cumberland County, Pennsylvania highlighting Southampton Township

- Map of Cumberland County, Pennsylvania
- Country: United States
- State: Pennsylvania
- County: Cumberland

Government
  - Type: Board of Supervisors

Area
  - Total: 51.60 sq mi (133.65 km^{2})
  - Land: 51.44 sq mi (133.24 km^{2})
  - Water: 0.16 sq mi (0.41 km^{2})

Population (2010)
  - Total: 6,359
  - Estimate (2016): 6,835
  - Density: 133/sq mi (51.3/km^{2})
- Time zone: UTC-5 (Eastern (EST))
  - Summer (DST): UTC-4 (EDT)
- Area code: 717
- FIPS code: 42-041-71904
- Website: southamptontwp.com

Historical population
Census	Pop.	Note	%±
2000	4,787		—
2010	6,359		32.8%
2016 (est.)	6,835		7.5%
U.S. Decennial Census

Southampton Township is a township in Cumberland County, Pennsylvania, United States. The population was 6,359 at the 2010 census, up from 4,787 at the 2000 census.

== Geography ==
Southampton Township occupies the southwestern corner of Cumberland County, bordered by Franklin County to the west and Adams County to the south. The township borders the borough of Shippensburg and neighboring Shippensburg Township on their north, east, and south. The northern half of the township is within the Cumberland Valley, while the southern half is occupied by South Mountain, with elevations exceeding 2,060 feet (630 m) in the Big Flat area of the mountain.

Interstate 81 crosses the northern part of the township, with access from Exit 29 (Pennsylvania Route 174). U.S. Route 11 crosses the township parallel to and north of I-81.

Unincorporated communities in the township include Middle Spring in the northwest, Lees Cross Roads in the east, and Cleversburg near the center. Most of the South Mountain part of the township is covered by Michaux State Forest, although there are private land holdings in the Big Flat area.

According to the United States Census Bureau, the township has a total area of 51.6 square miles (133.6 km^{2}), of which 51.4 square miles (133.2 km^{2}) is land and 0.15 square miles (0.4 km^{2}), or 0.32%, is water.

== Demographics ==
As of the census of 2000, there were 4,787 people, 1,649 households, and 1,335 families residing in the township. The population density was 91.3 inhabitants per square mile (35.3/km^{2}). There were 1,748 housing units at an average density of 33.3 per square mile (12.9/km^{2}). The racial makeup of the township was 98.04% White, 0.40% African American, 0.17% Native American, 0.31% Asian, 0.02% Pacific Islander, 0.23% from other races, and 0.84% from two or more races. Hispanic or Latino of any race were 0.75% of the population.

There were 1,649 households, out of which 38.0% had children under the age of 18 living with them, 71.7% were married couples living together, 5.4% had a female householder with no husband present, and 19.0% were non-families. 14.8% of all households were made up of individuals, and 5.9% had someone living alone who was 65 years of age or older. The average household size was 2.90 and the average family size was 3.23.

In the township the population was spread out, with 29.5% under the age of 18, 8.3% from 18 to 24, 29.2% from 25 to 44, 23.3% from 45 to 64, and 9.6% who were 65 years of age or older. The median age was 35 years. For every 100 females, there were 101.6 males. For every 100 females age 18 and over, there were 99.8 males.

The median income for a household in the township was $47,366, and the median income for a family was $50,119. Males had a median income of $34,934 versus $22,048 for females. The per capita income for the township was $17,458. About 5.0% of families and 8.8% of the population were below the poverty line, including 14.6% of those under age 18 and 4.6% of those age 65 or over.

== Education ==
The school district is Shippensburg Area School District.

A portion of Shippensburg University of Pennsylvania is in Southampton Township.
