= Conodoguinet Creek =

Stream in Pennsylvania, United States

Coordinates: 40°16′17″N 76°54′49″W

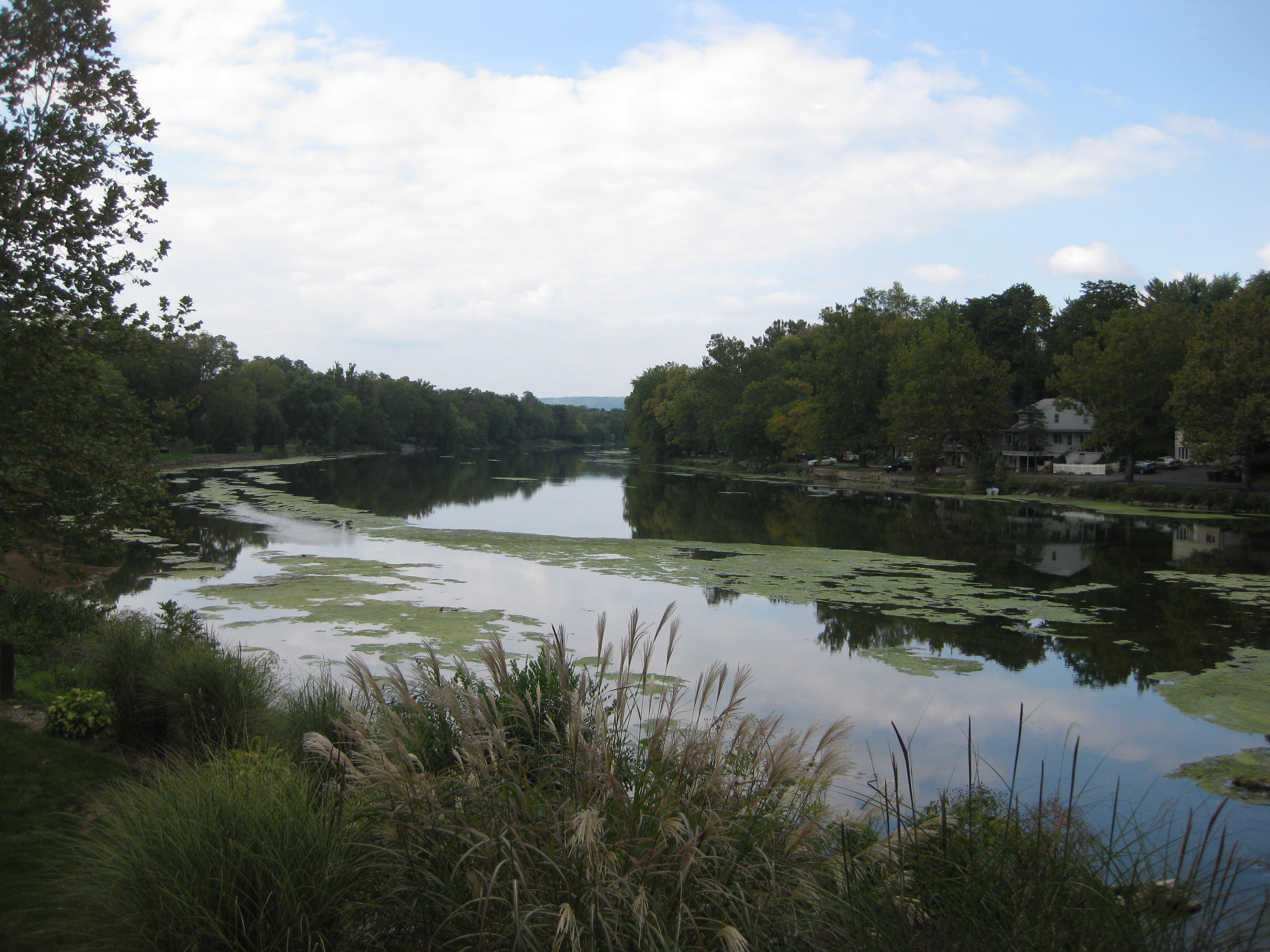
Conodoguinet Creek from its southern bank in Mechanicsburg, near Orrs Bridge Road

Conodoguinet Creek is a 104-mile-long (167 km) tributary of the Susquehanna River in South central Pennsylvania in the United States. The name is Native American, and means "A Long Way with Many Bends".

Conodoguinet Creek joins the Susquehanna River upstream of Harrisburg.

The headwaters for the Conodoguinet lie within the Fort Loudon, PA State Game Lands just East of Cowan's Gap State Park and McConnellsburg, PA. The Creek flows in a northerly direction through several State Games lands before emptying into the LetterKenny Reservoir near Roxbury, PA. From the reservoir, the Creek flows generally East passing Newville, Carlisle, and Mechanicsburg before terminating as it empties into the Susquehanna River.

The water divide between Conodoguinet Creek and Conococheague Creek is sometimes used as the boundary between the Hagerstown Valley and the Cumberland Valley. It flows past many mills, including Maclay's Mill. The Appalachian Trail crosses the creek near Carlisle.

== Bridges ==
- The Ramp Covered Bridge crosses Conodoguinet Creek at Hopewell Township in Cumberland County, Pennsylvania.
- There were formerly four more wooden covered bridges over the creek, but two were destroyed by storms ("Good Hope Mill" and "Watts Bridge") and the other three ("Erb's," "Orr's," and "Oyster Mill") were replaced by modern concrete bridges after they became so old as to be unreliable. Watts Bridge, near Creekside, the home of Frederick Watts, was also replaced by a concrete structure in the 1980s-90s; the Good Hope Mill bridge was never replaced after its destruction.
- Wolfs Bridge, a steel truss bridge in Middlesex Township, in Cumberland County, crosses the Conodoguinet Creek near Schlusser. It failed inspection in 2013, and a concrete replacement bridge will be completed in late 2020 or early 2021.
- Silver Spring Bridge, Silver Spring Township, Cumberland County, Pennsylvania was a covered bridge destroyed by the flood from Hurricane Agnes, June 1972. The new bridge, on Rich Valley Road, had already been in use for most traffic.
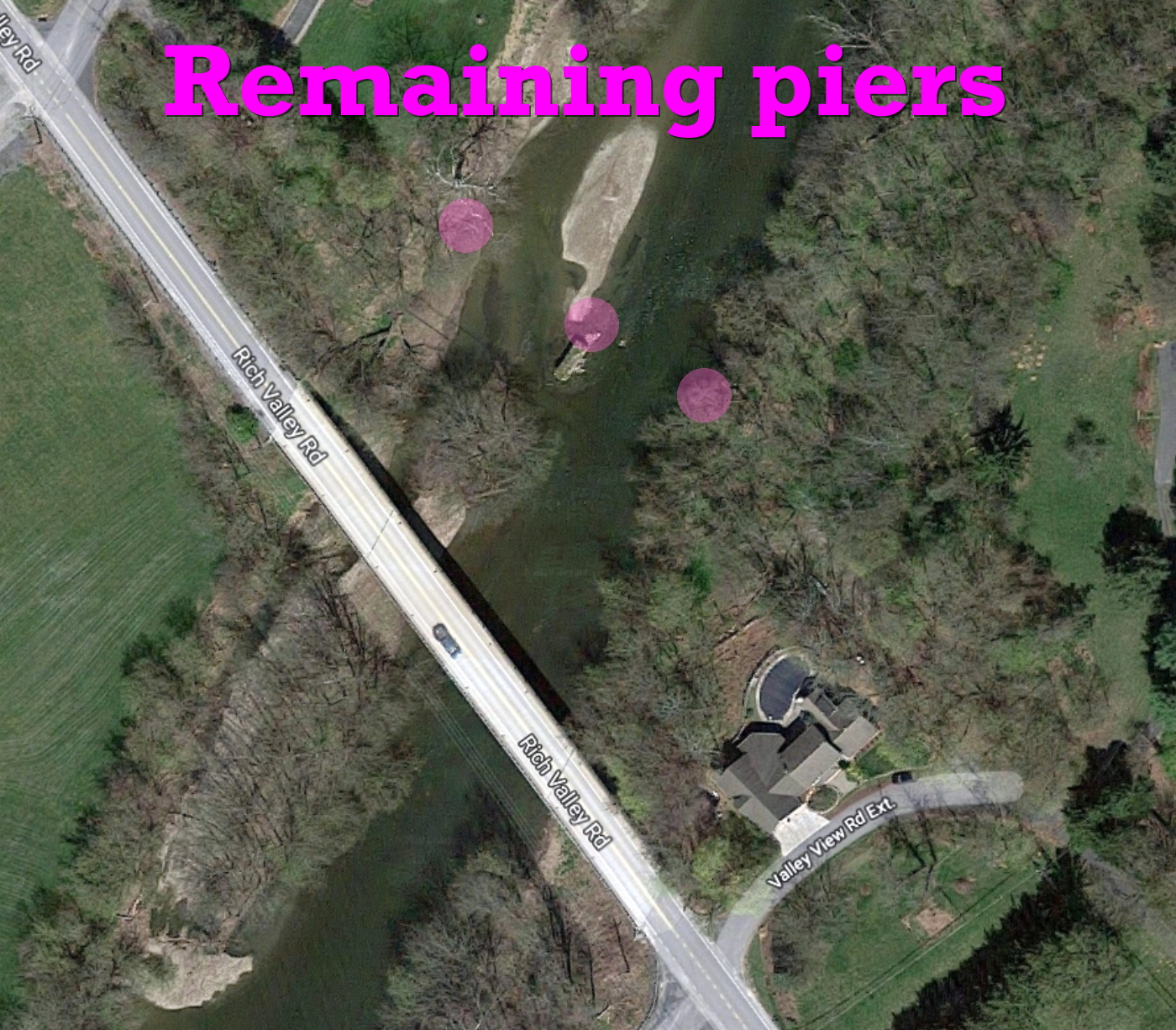
  Silver spring bridge pier

== See also ==
- List of rivers of Pennsylvania
