= List of former United States senators =

This is a complete list of former United States senators. As of November 2026, a total of 2,020 persons have served in the senate (including those currently serving).

In the party affiliation column, if a senator switched parties and served non-consecutive terms, their affiliation for each term is listed on the corresponding line.

== List of former senators ==
Name	Term	Class	State	Party	Lifespan
Joseph Carter Abbott	1868–1871	2	North Carolina	Republican	1825–1881
James Abdnor	1981–1987	3	South Dakota	Republican	1923–2012
Hazel Abel	1954	2	Nebraska	Republican	1888–1966
James Abourezk	1973–1979	2	South Dakota	Democratic	1931–2023
Spencer Abraham	1995–2001	1	Michigan	Republican	1952–present
John Adair	1805–1806	3	Kentucky	Democratic-Republican	1757–1840
Alva B. Adams	1923–1924; 1933–1941	3	Colorado	Democratic	1875–1941
Brock Adams	1987–1993	3	Washington	Democratic	1927–2004
John Quincy Adams	1803–1808	1	Massachusetts	Federalist	1767–1848
Robert H. Adams	1830	2	Mississippi	Democratic	1792–1830
Stephen Adams	1852–1857	1	Mississippi	Democratic	1807–1857
George Aiken	1941–1975	3	Vermont	Republican	1892–1984
Daniel Akaka	1990–2013	1	Hawaii	Democratic	1924–2018
James L. Alcorn	1871–1877	2	Mississippi	Republican	1816–1894
Nelson W. Aldrich	1881–1911	1	Rhode Island	Republican	1841–1915
Lamar Alexander	2003–2021	2	Tennessee	Republican	1940–present
Russell A. Alger	1902–1907	2	Michigan	Republican	1836–1907
Wayne Allard	1997–2009	2	Colorado	Republican	1943–present
J. Frank Allee	1903–1907	2	Delaware	Republican	1857–1938
George Allen	2001–2007	1	Virginia	Republican	1952–present
Henry J. Allen	1929–1930	3	Kansas	Republican	1868–1950
James Allen	1969–1978	3	Alabama	Democratic	1912–1978
John B. Allen	1889–1893; 1893	1	Washington	Republican	1845–1903
Maryon Pittman Allen	1978	3	Alabama	Democratic	1925–2018
Philip Allen	1853–1859	2	Rhode Island	Democratic	1785–1865
William Allen	1837–1849	3	Ohio	Democratic	1803–1879
William V. Allen	1893–1899; 1899–1901	1	Nebraska	Populist	1847–1924
William B. Allison	1873–1908	3	Iowa	Republican	1829–1908
Gordon Allott	1955–1973	2	Colorado	Republican	1907–1989
Adelbert Ames	1870–1874	1	Mississippi	Republican	1835–1933
Alexander O. Anderson	1840–1841	2	Tennessee	Democratic	1794–1869
Clinton Anderson	1949–1973	2	New Mexico	Democratic	1895–1975
Joseph Anderson	1797–1799; 1799–1815	2; 1	Tennessee	Democratic-Republican	1757–1837
Wendell R. Anderson	1976–1978	2	Minnesota	Democratic	1933–2016
Charles O. Andrews	1936–1946	1	Florida	Democratic	1877–1946
Mark Andrews	1981–1987	3	North Dakota	Republican	1926–2020
Levi Ankeny	1903–1909	3	Washington	Republican	1844–1921
Henry B. Anthony	1859–1884	2	Rhode Island	Republican	1815–1884
William S. Archer	1841–1847	2	Virginia	Whig	1789–1855
David H. Armstrong	1877–1879	3	Missouri	Democratic	1812–1893
John Armstrong Jr.	1800–1802; 1803–1804; 1804	3; 3; 1	New York	Democratic-Republican	1758–1843
William L. Armstrong	1979–1991	2	Colorado	Republican	1937–2016
Samuel G. Arnold	1862–1863	1	Rhode Island	Republican	1821–1880
John Ashcroft	1995–2001	1	Missouri	Republican	1942–present
Chester Ashley	1844–1848	2	Arkansas	Democratic	1790–1848
Eli P. Ashmun	1816–1818	1	Massachusetts	Federalist	1770–1819
Henry F. Ashurst	1912–1941	1	Arizona	Democratic	1874–1962
David Rice Atchison	1843–1855	3	Missouri	Democratic	1807–1886
Charles G. Atherton	1843–1849; 1853	3; 2	New Hampshire	Democratic	1804–1853
Warren Austin	1931–1946	1	Vermont	Republican	1877–1962
Kelly Ayotte	2011–2017	3	New Hampshire	Republican	1968–present
Nathan L. Bachman	1933–1937	2	Tennessee	Democratic	1878–1937
Augustus O. Bacon	1895–1914	2	Georgia	Democratic	1839–1914
George Edmund Badger	1846–1855	3	North Carolina	Whig	1795–1866
Arthur P. Bagby	1841–1848	3	Alabama	Democratic	1794–1858
James E. Bailey	1877–1881	1	Tennessee	Democratic	1822–1885
Joseph W. Bailey	1901–1913	2	Texas	Democratic	1862–1929
Josiah Bailey	1931–1946	2	North Carolina	Democratic	1873–1946
Theodorus Bailey	1803–1804	1	New York	Democratic-Republican	1758–1828
David Baird Jr.	1929–1930	2	New Jersey	Republican	1881–1955
David Baird Sr.	1918–1919	2	New Jersey	Republican	1839–1927
David J. Baker	1830	2	Illinois	Democratic	1792–1869
Edward D. Baker	1860–1861	2	Oregon	Republican	1811–1861
Howard Baker	1967–1985	2	Tennessee	Republican	1925–2014
Lucien Baker	1895–1901	2	Kansas	Republican	1846–1907
Abraham Baldwin	1799–1807	2	Georgia	Democratic-Republican	1754–1807
Henry P. Baldwin	1879–1881	1	Michigan	Republican	1814–1892
Raymond E. Baldwin	1946–1949	1	Connecticut	Republican	1893–1986
Roger Sherman Baldwin	1847–1851	1	Connecticut	Whig	1793–1863
Joseph H. Ball	1940–1942; 1943–1949	2	Minnesota	Republican	1905–1993
L. Heisler Ball	1903–1905; 1919–1925	1; 2	Delaware	Republican	1861–1932
John H. Bankhead	1907–1920	2	Alabama	Democratic	1842–1920
John H. Bankhead II	1931–1946	2	Alabama	Democratic	1872–1946
James Barbour	1815–1825	1	Virginia	Democratic-Republican	1775–1842
John S. Barbour Jr.	1889–1892	2	Virginia	Democratic	1820–1892
W. Warren Barbour	1931–1937; 1938–1943	2; 1	New Jersey	Republican	1888–1943
Thomas R. Bard	1900–1905	1	California	Republican	1841–1915
Alben W. Barkley	1927–1949; 1955–1956	3; 2	Kentucky	Democratic	1877–1956
Dean Barkley	2002–2003	2	Minnesota	Independence	1950–present
Isaac D. Barnard	1827–1831	1	Pennsylvania	Democratic	1791–1834
William Barnum	1876–1879	3	Connecticut	Democratic	1818–1889
Robert Woodward Barnwell	1850	2	South Carolina	Democratic	1801–1882
Frank A. Barrett	1953–1959	1	Wyoming	Republican	1892–1962
Alexander Barrow	1841–1846	2	Louisiana	Whig	1801–1846
Pope Barrow	1882–1883	2	Georgia	Democratic	1839–1903
Alexander G. Barry	1938–1939	3	Oregon	Republican	1892–1952
William T. Barry	1814–1816	2	Kentucky	Democratic-Republican	1784–1835
Bob Bartlett	1959–1968	2	Alaska	Democratic	1904–1968
Dewey F. Bartlett	1973–1979	2	Oklahoma	Republican	1919–1979
David Barton	1821–1824; 1824–1831	3	Missouri	Democratic-Republican; National Republican	1783–1837
Ross Bass	1964–1967	2	Tennessee	Democratic	1918–1993
Richard Bassett	1789–1793	2	Delaware	Federalist	1745–1815
William B. Bate	1887–1905	1	Tennessee	Democratic	1826–1905
Ephraim Bateman	1826–1829	1	New Jersey	National Republican	1780–1829
Isaac C. Bates	1841–1845	2	Massachusetts	Whig	1779–1845
Martin W. Bates	1857–1859	2	Delaware	Democratic	1786–1869
Max Baucus	1978–2014	2	Montana	Democratic	1941–present
James A. Bayard	1804–1813	2	Delaware	Federalist	1767–1815
James A. Bayard Jr.	1851–1864; 1867–1869	1	Delaware	Democratic	1799–1880
Richard H. Bayard	1836–1839; 1841–1845	1	Delaware	Whig	1796–1868
Thomas F. Bayard	1869–1885	1	Delaware	Democratic	1828–1898
Thomas F. Bayard Jr.	1922–1929	1	Delaware	Democratic	1868–1942
Birch Bayh	1963–1981	3	Indiana	Democratic	1928–2019
Evan Bayh	1999–2011	3	Indiana	Democratic	1955–present
J. Glenn Beall	1953–1965	1	Maryland	Republican	1894–1971
J. Glenn Beall Jr.	1971–1977	1	Maryland	Republican	1927–2006
James B. Beck	1877–1890	2	Kentucky	Democratic	1822–1890
J. C. W. Beckham	1915–1921	3	Kentucky	Democratic	1869–1940
Mark Begich	2009–2015	2	Alaska	Democratic	1962–present
Charles H. Bell	1879	3	New Hampshire	Republican	1823–1893
James Bell	1855–1856; 1856–1857	3	New Hampshire	Whig; Republican	1804–1857
John Bell	1847–1853; 1853–1856; 1856–1859	2	Tennessee	Whig; Whig; American	1796–1869
Samuel Bell	1823–1824; 1824–1835	2	New Hampshire	Democratic-Republican; National Republican	1770–1850
Henry Bellmon	1969–1981	3	Oklahoma	Republican	1921–2009
George H. Bender	1954–1957	3	Ohio	Republican	1896–1961
Christie Benet	1918	2	South Carolina	Democratic	1879–1951
Judah P. Benjamin	1853–1856; 1856–1861	2	Louisiana	Whig; Democratic	1811–1884
Bob Bennett	1993–2011	3	Utah	Republican	1933–2016
Wallace F. Bennett	1951–1974	3	Utah	Republican	1898–1993
Alfred W. Benson	1906–1907	2	Kansas	Republican	1843–1916
Elmer A. Benson	1935–1936	2	Minnesota	Farmer–Labor	1895–1985
Thomas Hart Benton	1821–1824; 1824–1851	1	Missouri	Democratic-Republican; Democratic	1782–1858
William Benton	1949–1953	1	Connecticut	Democratic	1900–1973
Lloyd Bentsen	1971–1993	1	Texas	Democratic	1921–2006
John M. Berrien	1825–1829; 1841–1845; 1845–1847; 1847–1852	3; 2; 2; 2	Georgia	Democratic; Whig; Whig; Whig	1781–1856
George L. Berry	1937–1938	2	Tennessee	Democratic	1882–1948
James H. Berry	1885–1907	2	Arkansas	Democratic	1841–1913
Thaddeus Betts	1839–1840	1	Connecticut	Whig	1789–1840
Albert J. Beveridge	1899–1911	1	Indiana	Republican	1862–1927
George M. Bibb	1811–1814; 1829–1835	2	Kentucky	Democratic-Republican; Democratic	1776–1859
William W. Bibb	1813–1816	2	Georgia	Democratic-Republican	1781–1820
Alan Bible	1954–1974	3	Nevada	Democratic	1909–1988
Joe Biden	1973–2009	2	Delaware	Democratic	1942–present
Asa Biggs	1855–1858	3	North Carolina	Democratic	1811–1878
William Bigler	1856–1861	3	Pennsylvania	Democratic	1814–1880
Theodore G. Bilbo	1935–1947	1	Mississippi	Democratic	1877–1947
Jeff Bingaman	1983–2013	1	New Mexico	Democratic	1943–present
Hiram Bingham III	1924–1933	3	Connecticut	Republican	1875–1956
Kinsley S. Bingham	1859–1861	2	Michigan	Republican	1808–1861
William Bingham	1795–1801	3	Pennsylvania	Federalist	1752–1804
Hugo Black	1927–1937	3	Alabama	Democratic	1886–1971
John Black	1832–1833; 1833–1836; 1836–1838	1	Mississippi	Democratic; National Republican; Whig	1800–1854
J. C. S. Blackburn	1885–1897; 1901–1907	3; 2	Kentucky	Democratic	1838–1918
James G. Blaine	1876–1881	2	Maine	Republican	1830–1893
John J. Blaine	1927–1933	3	Wisconsin	Republican	1875–1934
Francis Preston Blair Jr.	1871–1873	3	Missouri	Democratic	1821–1875
Henry W. Blair	1879–1885; 1885–1891	3	New Hampshire	Republican	1834–1920
William A. Blakley	1957; 1961	1; 2	Texas	Democratic	1898–1976
Newton C. Blanchard	1894–1897	3	Louisiana	Democratic	1849–1922
Cole L. Blease	1925–1931	2	South Carolina	Democratic	1868–1942
Jesse Bledsoe	1813–1814	3	Kentucky	Democratic-Republican	1776–1836
Rufus Blodgett	1887–1893	1	New Jersey	Democratic	1834–1910
Timothy Bloodworth	1795–1801	3	North Carolina	Democratic-Republican	1736–1814
William Blount	1796–1797	2	Tennessee	Democratic-Republican	1749–1800
Roy Blunt	2011–2023	3	Missouri	Republican	1950–present
Elijah Boardman	1821–1823	1	Connecticut	Democratic-Republican	1760–1823
J. Caleb Boggs	1961–1973	2	Delaware	Republican	1909–1993
Lewis V. Bogy	1873–1877	3	Missouri	Democratic	1813–1877
Kit Bond	1987–2011	3	Missouri	Republican	1939–2025
Homer Bone	1933–1944	3	Washington	Democratic	1883–1970
Newton Booth	1875–1881	1	California	Anti-Monopolist	1825–1892
William Borah	1907–1940	2	Idaho	Republican	1865–1940
Arthur I. Boreman	1869–1875	1	West Virginia	Republican	1823–1896
David Boren	1979–1994	2	Oklahoma	Democratic	1941–2025
Solon Borland	1848–1853	3	Arkansas	Democratic	1808–1864
Rudy Boschwitz	1978–1991	2	Minnesota	Republican	1930–present
Joe Bottum	1962–1963	3	South Dakota	Republican	1903–1984
Dominique Bouligny	1824–1829	2	Louisiana	National Republican	1773–1833
Jonathan Bourne Jr.	1907–1913	2	Oregon	Republican	1855–1940
George S. Boutwell	1873–1877	2	Massachusetts	Republican	1818–1905
Lemuel J. Bowden	1863–1864	1	Virginia	Union	1815–1864
Thomas M. Bowen	1883–1889	2	Colorado	Republican	1835–1906
Eva Bowring	1954	2	Nebraska	Republican	1892–1985
Barbara Boxer	1993–2017	3	California	Democratic	1940–present
James W. Bradbury	1847–1853	2	Maine	Democratic	1802–1901
William Bradford	1793–1797	2	Rhode Island	Federalist	1729–1808
Bill Bradley	1979–1997	2	New Jersey	Democratic	1943–present
Stephen R. Bradley	1791–1795; 1801–1813	3	Vermont	Democratic-Republican	1754–1830
William O'Connell Bradley	1909–1914	3	Kentucky	Republican	1847–1914
James H. Brady	1913–1918	3	Idaho	Republican	1862–1918
Nicholas F. Brady	1982	1	New Jersey	Republican	1930–present
Thomas Bragg	1859–1861	2	North Carolina	Democratic	1810–1872
Lawrence Brainerd	1854–1855	3	Vermont	Free Soil	1794–1870
John Branch	1823–1829	2	North Carolina	Democratic	1782–1863
Frank B. Brandegee	1905–1924	3	Connecticut	Republican	1864–1924
Sam G. Bratton	1925–1933	2	New Mexico	Democratic	1888–1963
Mike Braun	2019–2025	1	Indiana	Republican	1954–present
John Breaux	1987–2005	3	Louisiana	Democratic	1944–present
John Breckinridge	1801–1805	3	Kentucky	Democratic-Republican	1760–1806
John C. Breckinridge	1861	3	Kentucky	Democratic	1821–1875
Sidney Breese	1843–1849	3	Illinois	Democratic	1800–1878
Richard Brent	1809–1814	1	Virginia	Democratic-Republican	1757–1814
Daniel Brewster	1963–1969	3	Maryland	Democratic	1923–2007
Owen Brewster	1941–1952	1	Maine	Republican	1888–1961
Calvin S. Brice	1891–1897	3	Ohio	Democratic	1845–1898
John W. Bricker	1947–1959	1	Ohio	Republican	1893–1986
Styles Bridges	1937–1961	2	New Hampshire	Republican	1898–1961
Frank O. Briggs	1907–1913	2	New Jersey	Republican	1851–1913
Frank P. Briggs	1945–1947	1	Missouri	Democratic	1894–1992
Jesse D. Bright	1845–1862	1	Indiana	Democratic	1812–1875
Joseph L. Bristow	1909–1915	3	Kansas	Republican	1861–1944
Bill Brock	1971–1977	1	Tennessee	Republican	1930–2021
William E. Brock	1929–1931	2	Tennessee	Democratic	1872–1950
David C. Broderick	1857–1859	1	California	Democratic	1820–1859
Richard Brodhead	1851–1857	1	Pennsylvania	Democratic	1811–1863
Edward Brooke	1967–1979	2	Massachusetts	Republican	1919–2015
Walker Brooke	1852–1853	2	Mississippi	Whig	1813–1869
Smith W. Brookhart	1922–1926; 1927–1933	2; 3	Iowa	Republican	1869–1944
C. Wayland Brooks	1940–1949	2	Illinois	Republican	1897–1957
J. Melville Broughton	1948–1949	2	North Carolina	Democratic	1888–1949
Edwin S. Broussard	1921–1933	3	Louisiana	Democratic	1874–1934
Robert F. Broussard	1915–1918	3	Louisiana	Democratic	1864–1918
Albert G. Brown	1854–1861	2	Mississippi	Democratic	1813–1880
Arthur Brown	1896–1897	3	Utah	Republican	1843–1906
B. Gratz Brown	1863–1867	3	Missouri	Republican	1826–1885
Bedford Brown	1829–1840	2	North Carolina	Democratic	1795–1870
Ernest S. Brown	1954	3	Nevada	Republican	1903–1965
Ethan Allen Brown	1822–1824; 1824–1825	3	Ohio	Democratic-Republican; National Republican	1776–1852
Fred H. Brown	1933–1939	3	New Hampshire	Democratic	1879–1955
Hank Brown	1991–1997	2	Colorado	Republican	1940–present
James Brown	1813–1817; 1819–1823	2; 3	Louisiana	Democratic-Republican	1766–1835
John Brown	1792–1805	2	Kentucky	Democratic-Republican	1757–1837
Joseph E. Brown	1880–1891	3	Georgia	Democratic	1821–1894
Norris Brown	1907–1913	2	Nebraska	Republican	1863–1960
Prentiss M. Brown	1936–1943	2	Michigan	Democratic	1889–1973
Scott Brown	2010–2013	1	Massachusetts	Republican	1959–present
Sherrod Brown	2007–2025	1	Ohio	Democratic	1952–present
Sam Brownback	1996–2011	3	Kansas	Republican	1956–present
Orville Hickman Browning	1861–1863	2	Illinois	Republican	1806–1881
Parson Brownlow	1869–1875	1	Tennessee	Republican	1805–1877
Jim Broyhill	1986	3	North Carolina	Republican	1927–2023
Blanche Bruce	1875–1881	1	Mississippi	Republican	1841–1898
William Cabell Bruce	1923–1929	1	Maryland	Democratic	1860–1946
Norman Brunsdale	1959–1960	1	North Dakota	Republican	1891–1978
Nathan P. Bryan	1911–1917	1	Florida	Democratic	1872–1935
Richard Bryan	1989–2001	1	Nevada	Democratic	1937–present
William James Bryan	1907–1908	3	Florida	Democratic	1876–1908
James Buchanan	1834–1845	3	Pennsylvania	Democratic	1791–1868
C. Douglass Buck	1943–1949	2	Delaware	Republican	1890–1965
Charles R. Buckalew	1863–1869	1	Pennsylvania	Democratic	1821–1899
William A. Buckingham	1869–1875	1	Connecticut	Republican	1804–1875
James L. Buckley	1971–1976; 1976–1977	1	New York	Conservative; Republican	1923–2023
Alexander Buckner	1831–1833	3	Missouri	Democratic	1785–1833
Morgan Bulkeley	1905–1911	1	Connecticut	Republican	1837–1922
Robert J. Bulkley	1930–1939	3	Ohio	Democratic	1880–1965
William B. Bulloch	1813	2	Georgia	Democratic-Republican	1777–1852
William J. Bulow	1931–1943	2	South Dakota	Democratic	1869–1960
Dale Bumpers	1975–1999	3	Arkansas	Democratic	1925–2016
Berkeley L. Bunker	1940–1942	1	Nevada	Democratic	1906–1999
Jim Bunning	1999–2011	3	Kentucky	Republican	1931–2017
Thomas G. Burch	1946	2	Virginia	Democratic	1869–1951
Jocelyn Burdick	1992	1	North Dakota	Democratic	1922–2019
Quentin Burdick	1961–1992	1	North Dakota	Democratic	1908–1992
Edward R. Burke	1935–1941	1	Nebraska	Democratic	1880–1968
Thomas A. Burke	1953–1954	3	Ohio	Democratic	1898–1971
Elmer Burkett	1905–1911	1	Nebraska	Republican	1867–1935
Edwin C. Burleigh	1913–1916	2	Maine	Republican	1843–1916
Jacob Burnet	1828–1831	3	Ohio	National Republican	1770–1853
Henry E. Burnham	1901–1913	2	New Hampshire	Republican	1844–1917
Conrad Burns	1989–2007	1	Montana	Republican	1935–2016
Ambrose Burnside	1875–1881	1	Rhode Island	Republican	1824–1881
Aaron Burr	1791–1797	1	New York	Democratic-Republican	1756–1836
Richard Burr	2005–2023	3	North Carolina	Republican	1955–present
James Burrill Jr.	1817–1820	2	Rhode Island	Federalist	1772–1820
Roland Burris	2009–2010	3	Illinois	Democratic	1937–present
Julius C. Burrows	1895–1911	1	Michigan	Republican	1837–1915
Holm O. Bursum	1921–1925	2	New Mexico	Republican	1867–1953
Harold H. Burton	1941–1945	1	Ohio	Republican	1888–1964
Joseph R. Burton	1901–1906	2	Kansas	Republican	1852–1923
Theodore E. Burton	1909–1915; 1928–1929	3	Ohio	Republican	1851–1929
Prescott Bush	1953–1963	3	Connecticut	Republican	1895–1972
Harlan J. Bushfield	1943–1948	2	South Dakota	Republican	1882–1948
Vera C. Bushfield	1948	2	South Dakota	Republican	1889–1976
Andrew Butler	1846–1857	3	South Carolina	Democratic	1796–1857
Hugh A. Butler	1941–1954	1	Nebraska	Republican	1878–1954
John Marshall Butler	1951–1963	3	Maryland	Republican	1897–1978
Laphonza Butler	2023–2024	1	California	Democratic	1979–present
Marion Butler	1895–1901	2	North Carolina	Populist	1863–1938
Matthew Butler	1877–1895	2	South Carolina	Democratic	1836–1909
Pierce Butler	1789–1795; 1795–1796; 1802–1804	2; 2; 3	South Carolina	Federalist; Democratic-Republican; Democratic-Republican	1744–1822
William M. Butler	1924–1926	1	Massachusetts	Republican	1861–1937
Harry F. Byrd	1933–1965	1	Virginia	Democratic	1887–1966
Harry F. Byrd Jr.	1965–1970; 1970–1983	1	Virginia	Democratic; Independent	1914–2013
Robert Byrd	1959–2010	1	West Virginia	Democratic	1917–2010
James F. Byrnes	1931–1941	2	South Carolina	Democratic	1882–1972
George Cabot	1791–1796	1	Massachusetts	Federalist	1752–1823
Donelson Caffery	1892–1901	2	Louisiana	Democratic	1835–1906
Harry P. Cain	1946–1953	1	Washington	Republican	1906–1979
William M. Calder	1917–1923	1	New York	Republican	1869–1945
Alexander Caldwell	1871–1873	2	Kansas	Republican	1830–1917
John C. Calhoun	1832–1837; 1837–1843; 1845–1850	2	South Carolina	Nullifier; Democratic; Democratic	1782–1850
Wilkinson Call	1879–1897	3	Florida	Democratic	1834–1910
Johnson N. Camden	1881–1887; 1893–1895	1; 2	West Virginia	Democratic	1828–1908
Johnson N. Camden Jr.f	1914–1915	3	Kentucky	Democratic	1865–1942
Angus Cameron	1875–1881; 1881–1885	1; 3	Wisconsin	Republican	1826–1897
J. Donald Cameron	1877–1897	3	Pennsylvania	Republican	1833–1918
Ralph H. Cameron	1921–1927	3	Arizona	Republican	1863–1953
Simon Cameron	1845–1849; 1857–1861; 1867–1877	3; 1; 3	Pennsylvania	Democratic; Republican; Republican	1799–1889
Alexander Campbell	1809–1813	3	Ohio	Democratic-Republican	1779–1857
Ben Nighthorse Campbell	1993–1995; 1995–2005	3	Colorado	Democratic; Republican	1933–2025
George W. Campbell	1811–1814; 1815–1818	2; 1	Tennessee	Democratic-Republican	1769–1848
Frank J. Cannon	1896; 1896–1899	1	Utah	Republican; Silver Republican	1859–1933
Howard Cannon	1959–1983	1	Nevada	Democratic	1912–2002
Homer E. Capehart	1945–1963	3	Indiana	Republican	1897–1979
Allen T. Caperton	1875–1876	1	West Virginia	Democratic	1810–1876
Arthur Capper	1919–1949	2	Kansas	Republican	1865–1951
Hattie Caraway	1931–1945	3	Arkansas	Democratic	1878–1950
Thaddeus H. Caraway	1921–1931	3	Arkansas	Democratic	1871–1931
Ben Cardin	2007–2025	1	Maryland	Democratic	1943–present
Joseph M. Carey	1890–1895	2	Wyoming	Republican	1845–1924
Robert D. Carey	1930–1937	2	Wyoming	Republican	1878–1937
John S. Carlile	1861–1865	2	Virginia	Union	1817–1878
John G. Carlisle	1890–1893	2	Kentucky	Democratic	1834–1910
Frank Carlson	1950–1969	3	Kansas	Republican	1893–1987
Edward W. Carmack	1901–1907	2	Tennessee	Democratic	1858–1908
Jean Carnahan	2001–2002	1	Missouri	Democratic	1933–2024
Matthew H. Carpenter	1869–1875; 1879–1881	1; 3	Wisconsin	Republican	1824–1881
Tom Carper	2001–2025	1	Delaware	Democratic	1947–present
Charles Carroll of Carrollton	1789–1792	1	Maryland	Federalist	1737–1832
John A. Carroll	1957–1963	3	Colorado	Democratic	1901–1983
Thomas H. Carter	1895–1901; 1905–1911	2; 1	Montana	Republican	1854–1911
Edward P. Carville	1945–1947	1	Nevada	Democratic	1885–1956
Clifford P. Case	1955–1979	2	New Jersey	Republican	1904–1982
Francis Case	1951–1962	3	South Dakota	Republican	1896–1962
Bob Casey Jr.	2007–2025	1	Pennsylvania	Democratic	1960–present
Lyman R. Casey	1889–1893	1	North Dakota	Republican	1837–1914
Lewis Cass	1845–1848; 1849–1857	1	Michigan	Democratic	1782–1866
Eugene Casserly	1869–1873	1	California	Democratic	1820–1883
Charles W. Cathcart	1852–1853	3	Indiana	Democratic	1809–1888
Thomas B. Catron	1912–1917	1	New Mexico	Republican	1840–1921
Alexander G. Cattell	1866–1871	2	New Jersey	Republican	1816–1894
Jonathan Chace	1885–1889	2	Rhode Island	Republican	1829–1917
John Chafee	1976–1999	1	Rhode Island	Republican	1922–1999
Lincoln Chafee	1999–2007	1	Rhode Island	Republican	1953–present
Jerome B. Chaffee	1876–1879	3	Colorado	Republican	1825–1886
Joseph W. Chalmers	1845–1847	2	Mississippi	Democratic	1806–1853
George E. Chamberlain	1909–1921	3	Oregon	Democratic	1854–1928
Ezekiel F. Chambers	1826–1834	3	Maryland	National Republican	1788–1867
Henry H. Chambers	1825–1826	3	Alabama	Democratic	1790–1867
Saxby Chambliss	2003–2015	2	Georgia	Republican	1943–present
Christopher G. Champlin	1809–1811	1	Rhode Island	Federalist	1768–1840
Happy Chandler	1939–1945	2	Kentucky	Democratic	1898–1991
John Chandler	1820–1824; 1824–1829	2	Maine	Democratic-Republican; Democratic	1762–1841
William E. Chandler	1887–1889; 1889–1901	2	New Hampshire	Republican	1835–1917
Zachariah Chandler	1857–1875; 1879	1	Michigan	Republican	1813–1879
Virgil Chapman	1949–1951	2	Kentucky	Democratic	1895–1951
Robert M. Charlton	1852–1853	2	Georgia	Democratic	1807–1854
Dudley Chase	1813–1817; 1825–1831	3	Vermont	Democratic-Republican; National Republican	1771–1846
Salmon P. Chase	1849–1855; 1861	3	Ohio	Free Soil; Republican	1808–1873
Dennis Chávez	1935–1962	1	New Mexico	Democratic	1888–1962
Person Colby Cheney	1886–1887	2	New Hampshire	Republican	1828–1901
James Chesnut Jr.	1858–1860	2	South Carolina	Democratic	1815–1885
Jeffrey Chiesa	2013	2	New Jersey	Republican	1965–present
George M. Chilcott	1882–1883	2	Colorado	Republican	1828–1891
Lawton Chiles	1971–1989	1	Florida	Democratic	1930–1998
Horace Chilton	1891–1892; 1895–1901	1; 2	Texas	Democratic	1853–1932
William E. Chilton	1911–1917	1	West Virginia	Democratic	1858–1939
Nathaniel Chipman	1797–1803	1	Vermont	Federalist	1752–1843
Rufus Choate	1841–1845	1	Massachusetts	Whig	1799–1859
Isaac P. Christiancy	1875–1879	1	Michigan	Republican	1812–1890
Frank Church	1957–1981	3	Idaho	Democratic	1924–1984
Joseph Cilley	1846–1847	2	New Hampshire	Liberty	1791–1887
William C. C. Claiborne	1817	2	Louisiana	Democratic-Republican	1772–1817
Moses E. Clapp	1901–1917	1	Minnesota	Republican	1851–1929
Bennett Champ Clark	1933–1945	3	Missouri	Democratic	1890–1954
Clarence D. Clark	1895–1917	1	Wyoming	Republican	1851–1930
D. Worth Clark	1939–1945	3	Idaho	Democratic	1902–1955
Daniel Clark	1857–1866	3	New Hampshire	Republican	1809–1891
Dick Clark	1973–1979	2	Iowa	Democratic	1928–2023
Joseph S. Clark Jr.	1957–1969	3	Pennsylvania	Democratic	1901–1990
William A. Clark	1899–1900; 1901–1907	1; 2	Montana	Democratic	1839–1925
James P. Clarke	1903–1916	3	Arkansas	Democratic	1854–1916
John Hopkins Clarke	1847–1853	2	Rhode Island	Whig	1789–1870
Alexander S. Clay	1897–1910	3	Georgia	Democratic	1853–1910
Clement Claiborne Clay	1853–1861	2	Alabama	Democratic	1816–1882
Clement Comer Clay	1837–1841	3	Alabama	Democratic	1789–1866
Henry Clay	1806–1807; 1810–1811; 1831–1832; 1832–1842; 1849–1852	3; 2; 3; 3; 3	Kentucky	Democratic-Republican; Democratic-Republican; National Republican; Whig; Whig	1777–1852
John M. Clayton	1829–1836; 1845–1849; 1853–1855; 1855–1856	2; 1; 2; 2	Delaware	National Republican; Whig; Whig; Opposition	1796–1856
Joshua Clayton	1798	2	Delaware	Federalist	1744–1798
Powell Clayton	1871–1877	2	Arkansas	Republican	1833–1914
Thomas Clayton	1824–1825; 1825–1827; 1837–1847	1; 1; 2	Delaware	Federalist; National Republican; Whig	1777–1854
Max Cleland	1997–2003	2	Georgia	Democratic	1942–2021
Jeremiah Clemens	1849–1853	2	Alabama	Democratic	1814–1865
Earle Clements	1950–1957	3	Kentucky	Democratic	1896–1985
Thomas L. Clingman	1858–1861	3	North Carolina	Democratic	1812–1897
DeWitt Clinton	1802–1803	3	New York	Democratic-Republican	1769–1828
Hillary Clinton	2001–2009	1	New York	Democratic	1947–present
Dan Coats	1989–1999; 2011–2017	3	Indiana	Republican	1943–present
Thomas W. Cobb	1824–1828	2	Georgia	Democratic	1784–1830
Tom Coburn	2005–2015	3	Oklahoma	Republican	1948–2020
Thad Cochran	1978–2018	2	Mississippi	Republican	1937–2019
William Cocke	1796–1797; 1799–1805	1; 2	Tennessee	Democratic-Republican	1748–1828
Francis Cockrell	1875–1905	1	Missouri	Democratic	1834–1915
John S. Cohen	1932–1933	2	Georgia	Democratic	1870–1935
William Cohen	1979–1997	2	Maine	Republican	1940–present
Richard Coke	1877–1895	2	Texas	Democratic	1829–1897
Cornelius Cole	1867–1873	3	California	Republican	1822–1924
Norm Coleman	2003–2009	2	Minnesota	Republican	1949–present
John E. Colhoun	1801–1802	3	South Carolina	Democratic-Republican	1749–1802
Jacob Collamer	1855–1857; 1857–1865	3	Vermont	Opposition; Republican	1791–1865
Alfred H. Colquitt	1883–1894	2	Georgia	Democratic	1824–1894
Walter T. Colquitt	1843–1848	3	Georgia	Democratic	1799–1855
LeBaron B. Colt	1913–1924	2	Rhode Island	Republican	1846–1924
Joseph P. Comegys	1856–1857	2	Delaware	Opposition	1813–1893
B. B. Comer	1920	2	Alabama	Democratic	1848–1927
John Condit	1803–1809; 1809–1817	1; 2	New Jersey	Democratic-Republican	1755–1834
Omar D. Conger	1881–1887	1	Michigan	Republican	1818–1898
Roscoe Conkling	1867–1881	3	New York	Republican	1829–1888
Tom Connally	1929–1953	1	Texas	Democratic	1877–1963
John Conness	1863–1869	1	California	Republican	1821–1909
Simon B. Conover	1873–1879	3	Florida	Republican	1840–1908
Charles Magill Conrad	1842–1843	3	Louisiana	Whig	1804–1878
Kent Conrad	1987–1992; 1992–2013	3; 1	North Dakota	Democratic	1948–present
Marlow Cook	1968–1974	3	Kentucky	Republican	1926–2016
Marcus A. Coolidge	1931–1937	2	Massachusetts	Democratic	1865–1947
Henry Cooper	1871–1877	2	Tennessee	Democratic	1827–1884
James Cooper	1849–1855	3	Pennsylvania	Whig	1810–1863
John Sherman Cooper	1946–1949; 1952–1955; 1956–1973	2	Kentucky	Republican	1901–1991
Royal S. Copeland	1923–1938	1	New York	Democratic	1868–1938
Henry W. Corbett	1867–1873	3	Oregon	Republican	1827–1903
Guy Cordon	1944–1955	2	Oregon	Republican	1890–1969
Bob Corker	2007–2019	1	Tennessee	Republican	1952–present
Thomas Corwin	1845–1850	1	Ohio	Whig	1794–1865
Jon Corzine	2001–2006	1	New Jersey	Democratic	1947–present
Edward P. Costigan	1931–1937	2	Colorado	Democratic	1874–1939
Norris Cotton	1954–1974; 1975	3	New Hampshire	Republican	1900–1989
James Couzens	1922–1936	2	Michigan	Republican	1872–1936
Paul Coverdell	1993–2000	3	Georgia	Republican	1939–2000
Edgar Cowan	1861–1867	3	Pennsylvania	Republican	1815–1885
Mo Cowan	2013	2	Massachusetts	Democratic	1969–present
Samuel C. Crafts	1842–1843	3	Vermont	Whig	1768–1853
Aaron H. Cragin	1865–1877	2	New Hampshire	Republican	1821–1898
Larry Craig	1991–2009	2	Idaho	Republican	1945–present
Winthrop M. Crane	1904–1913	2	Massachusetts	Republican	1853–1920
Alan Cranston	1969–1993	3	California	Democratic	1914–2000
Coe I. Crawford	1909–1915	3	South Dakota	Republican	1858–1944
William H. Crawford	1807–1813	2	Georgia	Democratic-Republican	1772–1834
John Creswell	1865–1867	3	Maryland	Republican	1828–1891
Edward D. Crippa	1954	2	Wyoming	Republican	1899–1960
John J. Crittenden	1817–1819; 1835–1841; 1842–1848; 1855–1861	2; 2; 3; 3	Kentucky	Democratic-Republican; Whig; Whig; American	1787–1863
William E. Crow	1921–1922	1	Pennsylvania	Republican	1870–1922
Robert Crozier	1873–1874	2	Kansas	Republican	1827–1895
Charles A. Culberson	1899–1923	1	Texas	Democratic	1855–1925
Shelby M. Cullom	1883–1913	2	Illinois	Republican	1829–1914
John Culver	1975–1981	3	Iowa	Democratic	1932–2018
Albert B. Cummins	1908–1926	3	Iowa	Republican	1850–1926
Carl Curtis	1955–1979	2	Nebraska	Republican	1905–2000
Charles Curtis	1907–1913; 1915–1929	2; 3	Kansas	Republican	1860–1936
Alfred Cuthbert	1835–1843	3	Georgia	Democratic	1785–1856
Bronson M. Cutting	1927–1928; 1929–1935	1	New Mexico	Republican	1888–1935
Charles Cutts	1810–1813	3	New Hampshire	Democratic-Republican	1769–1846
Al D'Amato	1981–1999	3	New York	Republican	1937–present
David Daggett	1813–1819	3	Connecticut	Federalist	1764–1851
Porter H. Dale	1923–1933	3	Vermont	Republican	1867–1933
George M. Dallas	1831–1833	1	Pennsylvania	Democratic	1792–1864
Tristram Dalton	1789–1791	1	Massachusetts	Federalist	1738–1817
Judah Dana	1836–1837	1	Maine	Democratic	1772–1845
Samuel W. Dana	1810–1821	1	Connecticut	Federalist	1760–1830
John A. Danaher	1939–1945	3	Connecticut	Republican	1899–1990
John Danforth	1977–1995	1	Missouri	Republican	1936–present
Charles E. Daniel	1954	2	South Carolina	Democratic	1895–1964
John W. Daniel	1887–1910	1	Virginia	Democratic	1842–1910
Price Daniel	1953–1957	1	Texas	Democratic	1910–1988
Harry Darby	1949–1950	3	Kansas	Republican	1895–1987
Tom Daschle	1987–2005	3	South Dakota	Democratic	1947–present
Franklin Davenport	1798–1799	1	New Jersey	Federalist	1755–1832
Cushman K. Davis	1887–1900	1	Minnesota	Republican	1838–1900
David Davis	1877–1883	2	Illinois	Independent	1815–1886
Garrett Davis	1861–1872	3	Kentucky	Democratic	1801–1872
Henry G. Davis	1871–1883	2	West Virginia	Democratic	1823–1916
James J. Davis	1930–1945	3	Pennsylvania	Republican	1873–1947
Jeff Davis	1907–1913	2	Arkansas	Democratic	1862–1913
Jefferson Davis	1847–1851; 1857–1861	1	Mississippi	Democratic	1807/1808–1889
John Davis	1835–1836; 1836–1841; 1845–1853	2	Massachusetts	National Republican; Whig; Whig	1787–1854
Henry L. Dawes	1875–1893	1	Massachusetts	Republican	1816–1903
William C. Dawson	1849–1855	3	Georgia	Whig	1798–1856
Jonathan Dayton	1799–1805	2	New Jersey	Federalist	1760–1824
Mark Dayton	2001–2007	1	Minnesota	Democratic	1947–present
William L. Dayton	1842–1851	1	New Jersey	Whig	1807–1864
William F. De Saussure	1852–1853	2	South Carolina	Democratic	1792–1870
William J. Deboe	1897–1903	3	Kentucky	Republican	1849–1927
Dennis DeConcini	1977–1995	1	Arizona	Democratic	1937–present
Jim DeMint	2005–2013	3	South Carolina	Republican	1951–present
Charles S. Deneen	1925–1931	2	Illinois	Republican	1863–1940
George R. Dennis	1873–1879	3	Maryland	Democratic	1822–1882
Jeremiah Denton	1981–1987	3	Alabama	Republican	1924–2014
Chauncey Depew	1899–1911	1	New York	Republican	1834–1928
Jean Noël Destréhan	1812	2	Louisiana	Democratic-Republican	1754–1823
Mike DeWine	1995–2007	1	Ohio	Republican	1947–present
James DeWolf	1821–1824; 1824–1825	1	Rhode Island	Democratic-Republican; Democratic	1764–1837
Samuel Dexter	1799–1800	2	Massachusetts	Federalist	1761–1816
Nathaniel B. Dial	1919–1925	2	South Carolina	Democratic	1862–1940
Charles W. F. Dick	1904–1911	1	Ohio	Republican	1858–1945
Mahlon Dickerson	1817–1824; 1824–1829; 1829–1833	2; 2; 1	New Jersey	Democratic-Republican; Democratic; Democratic	1770–1853
Daniel S. Dickinson	1844–1851	1	New York	Democratic	1800–1866
L. J. Dickinson	1931–1937	2	Iowa	Republican	1873–1968
Philemon Dickinson	1790–1793	2	New Jersey	Federalist	1739–1809
William H. Dieterich	1933–1939	3	Illinois	Democratic	1876–1940
Charles H. Dietrich	1901–1905	1	Nebraska	Republican	1853–1924
Clarence Dill	1923–1935	1	Washington	Democratic	1884–1978
William P. Dillingham	1900–1923	3	Vermont	Republican	1843–1923
Everett Dirksen	1951–1969	3	Illinois	Republican	1896–1969
John Adams Dix	1845–1849	3	New York	Democratic	1798–1879
Alan J. Dixon	1981–1993	3	Illinois	Democratic	1927–2014
Archibald Dixon	1852–1855	3	Kentucky	Whig	1802–1876
James Dixon	1857–1869	1	Connecticut	Republican	1814–1873
Joseph M. Dixon	1907–1912; 1912–1913	2	Montana	Republican; Progressive	1867–1934
Nathan F. Dixon I	1839–1842	1	Rhode Island	Whig	1774–1842
Nathan F. Dixon III	1889–1895	2	Rhode Island	Republican	1847–1897
Chris Dodd	1981–2011	3	Connecticut	Democratic	1944–present
Thomas J. Dodd	1959–1971	1	Connecticut	Democratic	1907–1971
Augustus C. Dodge	1846–1855	3	Iowa	Democratic	1812–1883
Henry Dodge	1848–1857	1	Wisconsin	Democratic	1782–1867
Bob Dole	1969–1996	3	Kansas	Republican	1923–2021
Elizabeth Dole	2003–2009	2	North Carolina	Republican	1936–present
Jonathan P. Dolliver	1900–1910	2	Iowa	Republican	1858–1910
Joseph N. Dolph	1883–1895	2	Oregon	Republican	1835–1897
Pete Domenici	1973–2009	2	New Mexico	Republican	1932–2017
Peter H. Dominick	1963–1975	3	Colorado	Republican	1915–1981
Vic Donahey	1935–1941	1	Ohio	Democratic	1873–1946
Forrest C. Donnell	1945–1951	3	Missouri	Republican	1884–1980
Joe Donnelly	2013–2019	1	Indiana	Democratic	1955–present
James R. Doolittle	1857–1869	1	Wisconsin	Republican	1815–1897
Byron Dorgan	1992–2011	3	North Dakota	Democratic	1942–present
Stephen W. Dorsey	1873–1879	3	Arkansas	Republican	1842–1916
Paul Douglas	1949–1967	2	Illinois	Democratic	1892–1976
Stephen A. Douglas	1847–1861	2	Illinois	Democratic	1813–1861
Sheridan Downey	1939–1950	3	California	Democratic	1884–1961
Solomon W. Downs	1847–1853	2	Louisiana	Democratic	1801–1854
Wall Doxey	1941–1943	2	Mississippi	Democratic	1892–1962
Charles D. Drake	1867–1870	3	Missouri	Republican	1811–1892
Irving W. Drew	1918	3	New Hampshire	Republican	1845–1922
John F. Dryden	1902–1907	2	New Jersey	Republican	1839–1911
Henry A. du Pont	1906–1917	1	Delaware	Republican	1838–1926
T. Coleman du Pont	1921–1922; 1925–1928	1; 2	Delaware	Republican	1863–1930
Fred Dubois	1891–1896; 1896–1897; 1901–1907	3; 3; 2	Idaho	Republican; Silver Republican; Democratic	1851–1930
Charles E. Dudley	1829–1833	1	New York	Democratic	1780–1841
James H. Duff	1951–1957	3	Pennsylvania	Republican	1883–1969
F. Ryan Duffy	1933–1939	3	Wisconsin	Democratic	1888–1979
John Foster Dulles	1949	3	New York	Republican	1888–1959
David Durenberger	1978–1995	1	Minnesota	Republican	1934–2023
Charles Durkee	1855–1861	3	Wisconsin	Republican	1805–1870
John A. Durkin	1975–1980	3	New Hampshire	Democratic	1936–2012
Henry Dworshak	1946–1949; 1949–1962	2	Idaho	Republican	1894–1962
Thomas Eagleton	1969–1987	3	Missouri	Democratic	1929–2007
Joseph H. Earle	1897	3	South Carolina	Democratic	1847–1897
John P. East	1981–1986	3	North Carolina	Republican	1931–1986
James Eastland	1941; 1943–1978	2	Mississippi	Democratic	1904–1986
John Eaton	1818–1821; 1821–1829	1	Tennessee	Democratic-Republican	1790–1856
William W. Eaton	1875–1881	1	Connecticut	Democratic	1816–1898
Zales Ecton	1947–1953	1	Montana	Republican	1898–1961
Walter E. Edge	1919–1929	2	New Jersey	Republican	1873–1956
Alonzo J. Edgerton	1881	2	Minnesota	Republican	1827–1896
J. Howard Edmondson	1963–1964	2	Oklahoma	Democratic	1925–1971
George F. Edmunds	1866–1891	1	Vermont	Republican	1828–1919
Edward I. Edwards	1923–1929	1	New Jersey	Democratic	1863–1931
Elaine Edwards	1972	2	Louisiana	Democratic	1929–2018
Henry W. Edwards	1823–1827	1	Connecticut	Democratic	1779–1847
John Edwards	1792–1795	3	Kentucky	Democratic-Republican	1748–1837
John Edwards	1999–2005	3	North Carolina	Democratic	1953–present
Ninian Edwards	1818–1824	3	Illinois	Democratic-Republican	1775–1833
Davis Elkins	1911; 1919–1925	2	West Virginia	Republican	1876–1959
Stephen B. Elkins	1895–1911	2	West Virginia	Republican	1841–1911
Allen J. Ellender	1937–1972	2	Louisiana	Democratic	1890–1972
Christopher Ellery	1801–1805	2	Rhode Island	Democratic-Republican	1769–1840
John Elliott	1819–1825	3	Georgia	Democratic-Republican	1773–1827
Powhatan Ellis	1825–1826; 1827–1832	1	Mississippi	Democratic	1790–1863
Oliver Ellsworth	1789–1796	1	Connecticut	Federalist	1745–1807
Jonathan Elmer	1789–1791	1	New Jersey	Federalist	1745–1817
Franklin H. Elmore	1850	2	South Carolina	Democratic	1799–1850
Clair Engle	1959–1964	1	California	Democratic	1911–1964
James E. English	1875–1876	3	Connecticut	Democratic	1812–1890
John Ensign	2001–2011	1	Nevada	Republican	1958–present
Mike Enzi	1997–2021	2	Wyoming	Republican	1944–2021
John Wayles Eppes	1817–1819	2	Virginia	Democratic-Republican	1773–1823
John E. Erickson	1933–1934	2	Montana	Democratic	1863–1946
Richard P. Ernst	1921–1927	3	Kentucky	Republican	1858–1934
Sam Ervin	1954–1974	3	North Carolina	Democratic	1896–1985
James B. Eustis	1876–1879; 1885–1891	3	Louisiana	Democratic	1834–1899
Daniel J. Evans	1983–1989	1	Washington	Republican	1925–2024
George Evans	1841–1847	2	Maine	Whig	1797–1867
Josiah J. Evans	1853–1858	2	South Carolina	Democratic	1786–1858
William M. Evarts	1885–1891	3	New York	Republican	1818–1901
Edward Everett	1853–1854	2	Massachusetts	Whig	1794–1865
Thomas Ewing	1831–1837; 1850–1851	3; 1	Ohio	National Republican; Whig	1789–1871
William Lee D. Ewing	1835–1837	3	Illinois	Democratic	1795–1846
J. James Exon	1979–1997	2	Nebraska	Democratic	1921–2005
James G. Fair	1881–1887	1	Nevada	Democratic	1831–1894
Charles W. Fairbanks	1897–1905	3	Indiana	Republican	1852–1918
Lauch Faircloth	1993–1999	3	North Carolina	Republican	1928–2023
John Fairfield	1843–1847	1	Maine	Democratic	1797–1847
Albert B. Fall	1912–1921	2	New Mexico	Republican	1861–1944
Paul Fannin	1965–1977	1	Arizona	Republican	1907–2002
James T. Farley	1879–1885	3	California	Democratic	1829–1886
Charles B. Farwell	1887–1891	3	Illinois	Republican	1823–1903
Nathan A. Farwell	1864–1865	2	Maine	Republican	1812–1893
Charles James Faulkner	1887–1899	1	West Virginia	Democratic	1847–1929
William C. Feazel	1948	3	Louisiana	Democratic	1895–1965
Russ Feingold	1993–2011	3	Wisconsin	Democratic	1953–present
Dianne Feinstein	1992–2023	1	California	Democratic	1933–2023
Alpheus Felch	1847–1853	2	Michigan	Democratic	1804–1896
Charles N. Felton	1891–1893	1	California	Republican	1832–1914
Rebecca Latimer Felton	1922	3	Georgia	Democratic	1835–1930
James Fenner	1805–1807	2	Rhode Island	Democratic-Republican	1771–1846
Reuben Fenton	1869–1872; 1872–1875	1	New York	Republican; Liberal Republican	1819–1885
Homer S. Ferguson	1943–1955	2	Michigan	Republican	1889–1982
Bert M. Fernald	1916–1926	2	Maine	Republican	1858–1926
Woodbridge N. Ferris	1923–1928	1	Michigan	Democratic	1853–1928
Orris S. Ferry	1867–1872; 1872–1875; 1875	3	Connecticut	Republican; Liberal Republican; Republican	1823–1875
Thomas W. Ferry	1871–1883	2	Michigan	Republican	1827–1896
Simeon D. Fess	1923–1935	1	Ohio	Republican	1861–1936
William P. Fessenden	1854–1856; 1856–1864; 1865–1869	2	Maine	Whig; Republican; Republican	1806–1869
William Few	1789–1793	2	Georgia	Democratic-Republican	1748–1828
Richard Stockton Field	1862–1863	1	New Jersey	Republican	1803–1870
William Findlay	1821–1824; 1824–1827	1	Pennsylvania	Democratic-Republican; Democratic	1768–1846
Hamilton Fish	1851–1856; 1856–1857	1	New York	Whig; Republican	1808–1893
James Fisk	1817–1818	3	Vermont	Democratic-Republican	1763–1844
Graham N. Fitch	1857–1861	3	Indiana	Democratic	1809–1892
Peter Fitzgerald	1999–2005	3	Illinois	Republican	1960–present
Thomas Fitzgerald	1848–1849	1	Michigan	Democratic	1796–1855
Benjamin Fitzpatrick	1848–1849; 1853–1855; 1855–1861	2; 3; 3	Alabama	Democratic	1802–1869
Jeff Flake	2013–2019	1	Arizona	Republican	1962–present
J. W. Flanagan	1870–1875	1	Texas	Republican	1805–1887
Ralph Flanders	1946–1959	1	Vermont	Republican	1880–1970
Duncan U. Fletcher	1909–1936	3	Florida	Democratic	1859–1936
Frank Flint	1905–1911	1	California	Republican	1862–1929
George G. Fogg	1866–1867	3	New Hampshire	Republican	1813–1881
Hiram Fong	1959–1977	1	Hawaii	Republican	1906–2004
Samuel A. Foot	1827–1833	1	Connecticut	National Republican	1780–1846
Solomon Foot	1851–1856; 1856–1866	1	Vermont	Whig; Republican	1802–1866
Henry S. Foote	1847–1852	2	Mississippi	Democratic	1804–1880
Joseph B. Foraker	1897–1909	3	Ohio	Republican	1846–1917
Wendell Ford	1974–1999	3	Kentucky	Democratic	1924–2015
John Forsyth	1818–1819; 1829–1834	2; 3	Georgia	Democratic-Republican; Democratic	1780–1841
Addison G. Foster	1899–1905	1	Washington	Republican	1837–1917
Dwight Foster	1800–1803	2	Massachusetts	Federalist	1757–1823
Ephraim H. Foster	1838–1839; 1843–1845	1	Tennessee	Whig	1794–1854
Henry A. Foster	1844–1845	3	New York	Democratic	1800–1889
Lafayette S. Foster	1855–1856; 1856–1867	3	Connecticut	Whig; Republican	1806–1880
Murphy J. Foster	1901–1913	2	Louisiana	Democratic	1849–1921
Theodore Foster	1790–1801; 1801–1803	1	Rhode Island	Federalist; Democratic-Republican	1752–1828
Joseph S. Fowler	1866–1871	2	Tennessee	Republican	1820–1902
Wyche Fowler	1987–1993	3	Georgia	Democratic	1940–present
Sheila Frahm	1996	3	Kansas	Republican	1945–present
Joseph I. France	1917–1923	1	Maryland	Republican	1873–1939
John Brown Francis	1844–1845	1	Rhode Island	Law and Order	1791–1864
Al Franken	2009–2018	2	Minnesota	Democratic	1951–present
Jesse Franklin	1799–1805; 1807–1813	2; 3	North Carolina	Democratic-Republican	1760–1823
James B. Frazier	1905–1911	1	Tennessee	Democratic	1856–1937
Lynn Frazier	1923–1941	1	North Dakota	Republican	1874–1947
J. Allen Frear Jr.	1949–1961	2	Delaware	Democratic	1903–1993
Frederick Frelinghuysen	1793–1796	2	New Jersey	Federalist	1753–1804
Frederick T. Frelinghuysen	1866–1869; 1871–1877	1; 2	New Jersey	Republican	1817–1885
Joseph S. Frelinghuysen Sr.	1917–1923	1	New Jersey	Republican	1869–1948
Theodore Frelinghuysen	1829–1835	2	New Jersey	National Republican	1787–1862
John C. Frémont	1850–1851	1	California	Republican	1813–1890
Bill Frist	1995–2007	1	Tennessee	Republican	1952–present
Eligius Fromentin	1813–1819	3	Louisiana	Democratic-Republican	1767–1822
William P. Frye	1881–1911	2	Maine	Republican	1830–1911
J. William Fulbright	1945–1974	3	Arkansas	Democratic	1905–1995
Charles W. Fulton	1903–1909	3	Oregon	Republican	1853–1918
William S. Fulton	1836–1844	2	Arkansas	Democratic	1795–1844
John Gaillard	1805–1824; 1824–1826	3	South Carolina	Democratic-Republican; Democratic	1765–1826
Albert Gallatin	1793–1794	1	Pennsylvania	Democratic-Republican	1761–1849
Jacob H. Gallinger	1891–1918	3	New Hampshire	Republican	1837–1918
Robert J. Gamble	1901–1913	2	South Dakota	Republican	1851–1924
David H. Gambrell	1971–1972	2	Georgia	Democratic	1929–2021
Cory Gardner	2015–2021	2	Colorado	Republican	1974–present
Obadiah Gardner	1911–1913	2	Maine	Democratic	1852–1938
Augustus H. Garland	1877–1885	2	Arkansas	Democratic	1832–1899
Jake Garn	1974–1993	3	Utah	Republican	1932–present
Frank B. Gary	1908–1909	3	South Carolina	Democratic	1860–1922
Edward J. Gay	1918–1921	3	Louisiana	Democratic	1878–1952
John H. Gear	1895–1900	2	Iowa	Republican	1825–1900
John M. Gearin	1905–1907	2	Oregon	Democratic	1851–1930
James Z. George	1881–1897	1	Mississippi	Democratic	1826–1897
Walter F. George	1922–1957	3	Georgia	Democratic	1878–1957
Obadiah German	1809–1815	1	New York	Democratic-Republican	1766–1842
Peter G. Gerry	1917–1929; 1935–1947	1	Rhode Island	Democratic	1879–1957
Henry S. Geyer	1851–1855; 1855–1857	1	Missouri	Whig; Democratic	1790–1859
Charles H. Gibson	1891–1897	3	Maryland	Democratic	1842–1900
Ernest W. Gibson	1933–1940	3	Vermont	Republican	1872–1940
Ernest W. Gibson Jr.	1940–1941	3	Vermont	Republican	1901–1969
Paris Gibson	1901–1905	1	Montana	Democratic	1830–1920
Randall L. Gibson	1883–1892	2	Louisiana	Democratic	1832–1892
Abijah Gilbert	1869–1875	1	Florida	Republican	1806–1881
William Branch Giles	1804; 1804–1815	1; 2	Virginia	Democratic-Republican	1762–1830
Frederick H. Gillett	1925–1931	2	Massachusetts	Republican	1851–1935
Francis Gillette	1854–1855	3	Connecticut	Free Soil	1807–1879
Guy Gillette	1936–1945; 1949–1955	3; 2	Iowa	Democratic	1879–1973
Nicholas Gilman	1805–1814	2	New Hampshire	Democratic-Republican	1755–1814
Carter Glass	1920–1946	2	Virginia	Democratic	1858–1946
John Glenn	1974–1999	3	Ohio	Democratic	1921–2016
Otis F. Glenn	1928–1933	3	Illinois	Republican	1879–1959
Guy D. Goff	1925–1931	2	West Virginia	Republican	1866–1933
Nathan Goff Jr.	1913–1919	2	West Virginia	Republican	1843–1920
Phillips Lee Goldsborough	1929–1935	1	Maryland	Republican	1865–1946
Robert Henry Goldsborough	1813–1819; 1835–1836	3	Maryland	Federalist; National Republican	1779–1836
George Goldthwaite	1871–1877	2	Alabama	Democratic	1809–1879
Barry Goldwater	1953–1965; 1969–1987	1; 3	Arizona	Republican	1909–1998
Charles Goodell	1968–1971	1	New York	Republican	1926–1987
Benjamin Goodhue	1796–1800	1	Massachusetts	Federalist	1748–1814
Frank R. Gooding	1921–1928	3	Idaho	Republican	1859–1928
Chauncey Goodrich	1807–1813	3	Connecticut	Federalist	1759–1815
Carte Goodwin	2010	1	West Virginia	Democratic	1974–present
James Gordon	1909–1910	2	Mississippi	Democratic	1833–1912
John B. Gordon	1873–1880; 1891–1897	3	Georgia	Democratic	1832–1904
Al Gore	1985–1993	2	Tennessee	Democratic	1948–present
Albert Gore Sr.	1953–1971	1	Tennessee	Democratic	1907–1998
Christopher Gore	1813–1816	1	Massachusetts	Federalist	1758–1827
Thomas Gore	1907–1921; 1931–1937	3; 2	Oklahoma	Democratic	1870–1949
Arthur P. Gorman	1881–1899; 1903–1906	1; 3	Maryland	Democratic	1839–1906
Slade Gorton	1981–1987; 1989–2001	3; 1	Washington	Republican	1928–2020
Charles C. Gossett	1945–1946	2	Idaho	Democratic	1888–1974
Arthur R. Gould	1926–1931	2	Maine	Republican	1857–1946
Bob Graham	1987–2005	3	Florida	Democratic	1936–2024
Frank Porter Graham	1949–1950	2	North Carolina	Democratic	1886–1972
Lindsey Graham	2003–2026	2	South Carolina	Republican	1955–2026
William Alexander Graham	1840–1843	3	North Carolina	Whig	1804–1875
Phil Gramm	1985–2002	2	Texas	Republican	1942–present
Elijah S. Grammer	1932–1933	3	Washington	Republican	1868–1936
Rod Grams	1995–2001	1	Minnesota	Republican	1948–2013
Mike Gravel	1969–1981	3	Alaska	Democratic	1930–2021
Dixie Bibb Graves	1937–1938	3	Alabama	Democratic	1882–1965
George Gray	1885–1899	1	Delaware	Democratic	1840–1925
William Grayson	1789–1790	1	Virginia	Democratic-Republican	1740–1790
James S. Green	1857–1861	3	Missouri	Democratic	1817–1870
Theodore F. Green	1937–1961	2	Rhode Island	Democratic	1867–1966
Albert C. Greene	1845–1851	1	Rhode Island	Whig	1792–1863
Frank L. Greene	1923–1930	1	Vermont	Republican	1870–1930
Ray Greene	1797–1801	2	Rhode Island	Federalist	1765–1849
Andrew Gregg	1807–1813	3	Pennsylvania	Democratic-Republican	1755–1835
Judd Gregg	1993–2011	3	New Hampshire	Republican	1947–present
Robert P. Griffin	1966–1979	2	Michigan	Republican	1923–2015
James W. Grimes	1859–1869	2	Iowa	Republican	1816–1872
Dwight Griswold	1952–1954	2	Nebraska	Republican	1893–1954
Stanley Griswold	1809	3	Ohio	Democratic-Republican	1763–1815
Asle Gronna	1911–1921	3	North Dakota	Republican	1858–1922
James Black Groome	1879–1885	3	Maryland	Democratic	1838–1893
La Fayette Grover	1877–1883	2	Oregon	Democratic	1823–1911
Ernest Gruening	1959–1969	3	Alaska	Democratic	1887–1974
Felix Grundy	1829–1838; 1839–1840	1	Tennessee	Democratic	1775–1840
Joseph R. Grundy	1929–1930	3	Pennsylvania	Republican	1863–1961
Joseph F. Guffey	1935–1947	1	Pennsylvania	Democratic	1870–1959
Simon Guggenheim	1907–1913	2	Colorado	Republican	1867–1941
Walter Guion	1918	3	Louisiana	Democratic	1849–1927
James Gunn	1789–1797; 1797–1801	3	Georgia	Democratic-Republican; Federalist	1753–1801
Chan Gurney	1939–1951	3	South Dakota	Republican	1896–1985
Edward Gurney	1969–1974	3	Florida	Republican	1914–1996
James Guthrie	1865–1868	2	Kentucky	Democratic	1792–1869
William M. Gwin	1850–1855; 1857–1861	3	California	Democratic	1805–1885
Kay Hagan	2009–2015	2	North Carolina	Democratic	1953–2019
Chuck Hagel	1997–2009	2	Nebraska	Republican	1946–present
John S. Hager	1873–1875	1	California	Democratic	1818–1890
Eugene Hale	1881–1911	1	Maine	Republican	1836–1918
Frederick Hale	1917–1941	1	Maine	Republican	1874–1963
John P. Hale	1847–1848; 1848–1853; 1855–1856; 1856–1865	2	New Hampshire	Independent Democrat; Free Soil; Free Soil; Republican	1806–1873
Wilton E. Hall	1944–1945	3	South Carolina	Democratic	1901–1980
Morgan C. Hamilton	1870–1873; 1873–1875; 1875–1877	2	Texas	Republican; Liberal Republican; Republican	1809–1893
William T. Hamilton	1869–1875	1	Maryland	Democratic	1820–1888
Hannibal Hamlin	1848–1856; 1856–1857; 1857–1861; 1869–1881	1	Maine	Democratic; Republican; Republican; Republican	1809–1891
James H. Hammond	1857–1860	3	South Carolina	Democratic	1807–1864
Wade Hampton III	1879–1891	3	South Carolina	Democratic	1818–1902
Mark Hanna	1897–1904	1	Ohio	Republican	1837–1904
Robert Hanna	1831–1832	1	Indiana	National Republican	1786–1858
Edward A. Hannegan	1843–1849	3	Indiana	Democratic	1807–1859
Henry C. Hansbrough	1891–1909	3	North Dakota	Republican	1848–1933
Clifford Hansen	1967–1978	2	Wyoming	Republican	1912–2009
Alexander C. Hanson	1816–1819	1	Maryland	Federalist	1786–1819
Martin D. Hardin	1816–1817	2	Kentucky	Federalist	1780–1823
Benjamin F. Harding	1862–1865	2	Oregon	Democratic	1823–1899
Warren G. Harding	1915–1921	3	Ohio	Republican	1865–1923
Thomas W. Hardwick	1914–1919	2	Georgia	Democratic	1872–1944
Tom Harkin	1985–2015	2	Iowa	Democratic	1939–present
James Harlan	1855–1857; 1857–1865; 1867–1873	3	Iowa	Free Soil; Republican; Republican	1820–1899
Robert Goodloe Harper	1816	1	Maryland	Federalist	1765–1825
William Harper	1826	3	South Carolina	Democratic	1790–1847
John W. Harreld	1921–1927	3	Oklahoma	Republican	1872–1950
Fred R. Harris	1964–1973	2	Oklahoma	Democratic	1930–2024
Ira Harris	1861–1867	3	New York	Republican	1802–1875
Isham G. Harris	1877–1897	2	Tennessee	Democratic	1818–1897
John S. Harris	1868–1871	2	Louisiana	Republican	1825–1906
Kamala Harris	2017–2021	3	California	Democratic	1964–present
William A. Harris	1897–1903	3	Kansas	Populist	1841–1909
William J. Harris	1919–1932	2	Georgia	Democratic	1868–1932
Benjamin Harrison	1881–1887	1	Indiana	Republican	1833–1901
Pat Harrison	1919–1941	2	Mississippi	Democratic	1881–1941
William Henry Harrison	1825–1828	3	Ohio	National Republican	1773–1841
Gary Hart	1975–1987	3	Colorado	Democratic	1936–present
Philip Hart	1959–1976	1	Michigan	Democratic	1912–1976
Thomas C. Hart	1945–1946	1	Connecticut	Republican	1877–1971
Vance Hartke	1959–1977	1	Indiana	Democratic	1919–2003
James M. Harvey	1874–1877	2	Kansas	Republican	1833–1894
Floyd Haskell	1973–1979	2	Colorado	Democratic	1916–1998
Daniel O. Hastings	1928–1937	2	Delaware	Republican	1874–1966
Carl Hatch	1933–1949	2	New Mexico	Democratic	1889–1963
Orrin Hatch	1977–2019	1	Utah	Republican	1934–2022
Henry D. Hatfield	1929–1935	1	West Virginia	Republican	1875–1962
Mark Hatfield	1967–1997	2	Oregon	Republican	1922–2011
Paul G. Hatfield	1978	2	Montana	Democratic	1928–2000
William Hathaway	1973–1979	2	Maine	Democratic	1924–2013
Henry P. Haun	1859–1860	1	California	Democratic	1815–1860
Harry B. Hawes	1926–1933	3	Missouri	Democratic	1869–1947
Albert W. Hawkes	1943–1949	2	New Jersey	Republican	1878–1971
Benjamin Hawkins	1789–1791; 1791–1795	3	North Carolina	Federalist; Democratic-Republican	1754–1816
Paula Hawkins	1981–1987	3	Florida	Republican	1927–2009
Joseph R. Hawley	1881–1905	1	Connecticut	Republican	1826–1905
S. I. Hayakawa	1977–1983	1	California	Republican	1906–1992
Carl Hayden	1927–1969	3	Arizona	Democratic	1877–1972
Arthur P. Hayne	1858	2	South Carolina	Democratic	1788–1867
Robert Y. Hayne	1823–1824; 1824–1831; 1831–1832	2	South Carolina	Democratic-Republican; Democratic; Nullifier	1791–1839
Monroe Hayward	1899	1	Nebraska	Republican	1840–1899
William Henry Haywood Jr.	1843–1846	3	North Carolina	Democratic	1801–1852
George Hearst	1886; 1887–1891	1	California	Democratic	1820–1891
Felix Hebert	1929–1935	1	Rhode Island	Republican	1874–1969
Chic Hecht	1983–1989	1	Nevada	Republican	1928–2006
Howell Heflin	1979–1997	2	Alabama	Democratic	1921–2005
J. Thomas Heflin	1920–1931	2	Alabama	Democratic	1869–1951
John Heinz	1977–1991	1	Pennsylvania	Republican	1938–1991
John N. Heiskell	1913	2	Arkansas	Democratic	1872–1972
Henry Heitfeld	1897–1901; 1901–1903	3	Idaho	Populist; Democratic	1859–1938
Heidi Heitkamp	2013–2019	1	North Dakota	Democratic	1955–present
Dean Heller	2011–2019	1	Nevada	Republican	1960–present
Jesse Helms	1973–2003	2	North Carolina	Republican	1921–2008
George Helmy	2024	1	New Jersey	Democratic	1979–present
James A. Hemenway	1905–1909	3	Indiana	Republican	1860–1923
John Hemphill	1859–1861	2	Texas	Democratic	1803–1862
Charles Henderson	1918–1921	3	Nevada	Democratic	1873–1954
J. Pinckney Henderson	1857–1858	1	Texas	Democratic	1808–1858
John Henderson	1839–1845	1	Mississippi	Whig	1797–1857
John B. Henderson	1862–1865; 1865–1869	1	Missouri	Union; Republican	1826–1913
Thomas A. Hendricks	1863–1869	1	Indiana	Democratic	1819–1885
William Hendricks	1825–1837	3	Indiana	National Republican	1782–1850
Robert C. Hendrickson	1949–1955	2	New Jersey	Republican	1898–1964
Thomas C. Hennings Jr.	1951–1960	3	Missouri	Democratic	1903–1960
John Henry	1789–1797	3	Maryland	Federalist	1750–1798
Frank Hereford	1877–1881	1	West Virginia	Democratic	1825–1891
Clyde L. Herring	1937–1943	2	Iowa	Democratic	1879–1945
Weldon B. Heyburn	1903–1912	3	Idaho	Republican	1852–1912
Bourke B. Hickenlooper	1945–1969	3	Iowa	Republican	1896–1971
Joe Hickey	1961–1962	2	Wyoming	Democratic	1911–1970
Thomas Holliday Hicks	1862–1865	3	Maryland	Unconditional Union	1798–1865
Anthony Higgins	1889–1895	2	Delaware	Republican	1840–1912
Benjamin Harvey Hill	1877–1882	2	Georgia	Democratic	1823–1882
David B. Hill	1892–1897	3	New York	Democratic	1843–1910
Isaac Hill	1831–1836	3	New Hampshire	Democratic	1789–1851
J. Lister Hill	1938–1969	3	Alabama	Democratic	1894–1984
Joshua Hill	1868–1873	3	Georgia	Republican	1812–1891
Nathaniel P. Hill	1879–1885	3	Colorado	Republican	1832–1900
William Luther Hill	1936	3	Florida	Democratic	1873–1951
James Hillhouse	1796–1810	1	Connecticut	Federalist	1754–1832
William Hindman	1800–1801	3	Maryland	Federalist	1743–1822
Frank Hiscock	1887–1893	1	New York	Republican	1834–1914
Gilbert Hitchcock	1911–1923	1	Nebraska	Democratic	1859–1934
Herbert E. Hitchcock	1936–1938	3	South Dakota	Democratic	1867–1958
Phineas Hitchcock	1871–1877	2	Nebraska	Republican	1831–1881
George F. Hoar	1877–1904	2	Massachusetts	Republican	1826–1904
John Sloss Hobart	1798	1	New York	Federalist	1738–1805
John D. Hoblitzell Jr.	1958	2	West Virginia	Republican	1912–1962
Kaneaster Hodges Jr.	1977–1979	2	Arkansas	Democratic	1938–2022
Clyde R. Hoey	1945–1954	3	North Carolina	Democratic	1877–1954
Spessard Holland	1946–1971	1	Florida	Democratic	1892–1971
Fritz Hollings	1966–2005	3	South Carolina	Democratic	1922–2019
Henry F. Hollis	1913–1919	2	New Hampshire	Democratic	1869–1949
Rufus C. Holman	1939–1945	3	Oregon	Republican	1877–1959
David Holmes	1820–1825	1	Mississippi	Democratic-Republican	1769–1832
John Holmes	1820–1824; 1824–1827; 1829–1833	1	Maine	Democratic-Republican; National Republican; National Republican	1773–1843
Rush Holt Sr.	1935–1941	1	West Virginia	Democratic	1905–1955
Albert J. Hopkins	1903–1909	3	Illinois	Republican	1846–1922
Outerbridge Horsey	1810–1821	1	Delaware	Federalist	1777–1842
Andrew Jackson Houston	1941	2	Texas	Democratic	1854–1941
George S. Houston	1879	3	Alabama	Democratic	1811–1879
Sam Houston	1846–1855; 1855–1859	2	Texas	Democratic; American	1793–1863
Guy V. Howard	1936–1937	2	Minnesota	Republican	1879–1954
Jacob M. Howard	1862–1871	2	Michigan	Republican	1805–1871
John Eager Howard	1796–1803	1	Maryland	Federalist	1752–1827
Timothy O. Howe	1861–1879	3	Wisconsin	Republican	1816–1883
James B. Howell	1870–1871	2	Iowa	Republican	1816–1880
Jeremiah B. Howell	1811–1817	2	Rhode Island	Democratic-Republican	1771–1822
Robert B. Howell	1923–1933	1	Nebraska	Republican	1864–1933
Benjamin Howland	1804–1809	1	Rhode Island	Democratic-Republican	1755–1821
Roman Hruska	1954–1976	1	Nebraska	Republican	1904–1999
Henry Hubbard	1835–1841	2	New Hampshire	Democratic	1784–1857
Walter Dee Huddleston	1973–1985	2	Kentucky	Democratic	1926–2018
James W. Huffman	1945–1946	1	Ohio	Democratic	1894–1980
Daniel Elliott Huger	1843–1845	2	South Carolina	Democratic	1779–1854
Charles J. Hughes Jr.	1909–1911	3	Colorado	Democratic	1853–1911
Harold Hughes	1969–1975	3	Iowa	Democratic	1922–1996
James H. Hughes	1937–1943	2	Delaware	Democratic	1867–1953
William Hughes	1913–1918	2	New Jersey	Democratic	1872–1918
Cordell Hull	1931–1933	2	Tennessee	Democratic	1871–1955
Gordon J. Humphrey	1979–1990	2	New Hampshire	Republican	1940–present
Hubert Humphrey	1949–1964; 1971–1978	2; 1	Minnesota	Democratic	1911–1978
Muriel Humphrey	1978	1	Minnesota	Democratic	1912–1998
Robert Humphreys	1956	2	Kentucky	Democratic	1893–1977
Lester C. Hunt	1949–1954	2	Wyoming	Democratic	1892–1954
John Hunter	1796–1798	2	South Carolina	Democratic-Republican	1750–1802
Richard C. Hunter	1934–1935	1	Nebraska	Democratic	1884–1941
Robert M. T. Hunter	1847–1861	2	Virginia	Democratic	1809–1887
William Hunter	1811–1821	1	Rhode Island	Federalist	1774–1849
Jabez W. Huntington	1840–1847	1	Connecticut	Whig	1788–1847
Eppa Hunton	1892–1895	2	Virginia	Democratic	1822–1908
Paul O. Husting	1915–1917	3	Wisconsin	Democratic	1866–1917
Tim Hutchinson	1997–2003	2	Arkansas	Republican	1949–present
Kay Bailey Hutchison	1993–2013	1	Texas	Republican	1943–present
John J. Ingalls	1873–1891	3	Kansas	Republican	1833–1900
Jim Inhofe	1994–2023	2	Oklahoma	Republican	1934–2024
Daniel Inouye	1963–2012	3	Hawaii	Democratic	1924–2012
John L. M. Irby	1891–1897	3	South Carolina	Democratic	1854–1900
James Iredell Jr.	1828–1831	3	North Carolina	Democratic	1788–1853
Johnny Isakson	2005–2019	3	Georgia	Republican	1944–2021
Alfred Iverson Sr.	1855–1861	3	Georgia	Democratic	1798–1873
Irving Ives	1947–1959	1	New York	Republican	1896–1962
Ralph Izard	1789–1795	3	South Carolina	Federalist	1741/1742–1804
Andrew Jackson	1797–1798; 1823–1825	1; 2	Tennessee	Democratic-Republican	1767–1845
Henry M. Jackson	1953–1983	1	Washington	Democratic	1912–1983
Howell E. Jackson	1881–1886	1	Tennessee	Democratic	1832–1895
James Jackson	1793–1795; 1801–1806	2; 3	Georgia	Democratic-Republican	1757–1806
Samuel D. Jackson	1944	3	Indiana	Democratic	1895–1951
William P. Jackson	1912–1914	1	Maryland	Republican	1868–1939
Charles Tillinghast James	1851–1857	1	Rhode Island	Democratic	1805–1862
Ollie Murray James	1913–1918	2	Kentucky	Democratic	1871–1918
Spencer Jarnagin	1843–1847	2	Tennessee	Whig	1792–1853
Thomas J. Jarvis	1894–1895	3	North Carolina	Democratic	1836–1915
Jacob Javits	1957–1981	3	New York	Republican	1904–1986
Jim Jeffords	1989–2001; 2001–2007	1	Vermont	Republican; Independent	1934–2014
William E. Jenner	1944–1945; 1947–1959	3; 1	Indiana	Republican	1908–1985
Benning W. Jenness	1845–1846	2	New Hampshire	Democratic	1806–1879
Roger Jepsen	1979–1985	2	Iowa	Republican	1928–2020
Daniel T. Jewett	1870–1871	3	Missouri	Republican	1807–1906
Mike Johanns	2009–2015	2	Nebraska	Republican	1950–present
Andrew Johnson	1857–1862; 1875	1	Tennessee	Democratic	1808–1875
Charles F. Johnson	1911–1917	1	Maine	Democratic	1859–1930
Edwin C. Johnson	1937–1955	2	Colorado	Democratic	1884–1970
Edwin S. Johnson	1915–1921	3	South Dakota	Democratic	1857–1933
Henry Johnson	1818–1823; 1823–1824; 1844–1849	2; 2; 3	Louisiana	Democratic-Republican; National Republican; Whig	1783–1864
Herschel V. Johnson	1848–1849	3	Georgia	Democratic	1812–1880
Hiram Johnson	1917–1945	1	California	Republican	1866–1945
Lyndon B. Johnson	1949–1961	2	Texas	Democratic	1908–1973
Magnus Johnson	1923–1925	2	Minnesota	Farmer–Labor	1871–1936
Martin N. Johnson	1909	3	North Dakota	Republican	1850–1909
Reverdy Johnson	1845–1849; 1863–1868	1	Maryland	Whig; Democratic	1796–1876
Richard Mentor Johnson	1819–1824; 1824–1829	2	Kentucky	Democratic-Republican; Democratic	1780–1850
Robert Ward Johnson	1853–1861	3	Arkansas	Democratic	1814–1879
Tim Johnson	1997–2015	2	South Dakota	Democratic	1946–2024
Waldo P. Johnson	1861–1862	3	Missouri	Democratic	1817–1885
William Samuel Johnson	1789–1791	3	Connecticut	Federalist	1727–1819
J. Bennett Johnston	1972–1997	2	Louisiana	Democratic	1932–2025
John W. Johnston	1870–1871; 1871–1883	2	Virginia	Democratic	1818–1889
Joseph F. Johnston	1907–1913	3	Alabama	Democratic	1843–1913
Josiah S. Johnston	1824–1833	3	Louisiana	National Republican	1784–1833
Olin D. Johnston	1945–1965	3	South Carolina	Democratic	1896–1965
Rienzi Melville Johnston	1913	2	Texas	Democratic	1849–1926
Samuel Johnston	1789–1793	2	North Carolina	Federalist	1733–1816
Benjamin F. Jonas	1879–1885	3	Louisiana	Democratic	1834–1911
Andrieus A. Jones	1917–1927	1	New Mexico	Democratic	1862–1927
Charles W. Jones	1875–1887	1	Florida	Democratic	1834–1897
Doug Jones	2018–2021	2	Alabama	Democratic	1954–present
George Jones	1807	2	Georgia	Democratic-Republican	1766–1838
George Wallace Jones	1848–1859	2	Iowa	Democratic	1804–1896
James C. Jones	1851–1856; 1856–1857	1	Tennessee	Whig; Democratic	1809–1859
James K. Jones	1885–1903	3	Arkansas	Democratic	1839–1908
John P. Jones	1873–1895; 1895–1901; 1901–1903	3	Nevada	Republican; Silverite; Republican	1829–1912
Wesley L. Jones	1909–1932	3	Washington	Republican	1863–1932
B. Everett Jordan	1958–1973	2	North Carolina	Democratic	1896–1974
Len Jordan	1962–1973	2	Idaho	Republican	1899–1983
Elias Kane	1825–1835	3	Illinois	Democratic	1794–1835
David Karnes	1987–1989	1	Nebraska	Republican	1948–2020
Nancy Kassebaum	1978–1997	2	Kansas	Republican	1932–2026
Bob Kasten	1981–1993	3	Wisconsin	Republican	1942–present
Ted Kaufman	2009–2010	2	Delaware	Democratic	1939–present
William Marmaduke Kavanaugh	1913	2	Arkansas	Democratic	1866–1915
Hamilton F. Kean	1929–1935	1	New Jersey	Republican	1862–1941
John Kean	1899–1911	1	New Jersey	Republican	1852–1914
Thomas Kearns	1901–1905	1	Utah	Republican	1862–1918
Kenneth Keating	1959–1965	1	New York	Republican	1900–1975
Estes Kefauver	1949–1963	2	Tennessee	Democratic	1903–1963
Frank B. Kellogg	1917–1923	1	Minnesota	Republican	1856–1937
William Pitt Kellogg	1868–1872; 1877–1883	3; 2	Louisiana	Republican	1830–1918
James K. Kelly	1871–1877	2	Oregon	Democratic	1819–1903
William Kelly	1822–1825	3	Alabama	Democratic-Republican	1786–1834
James P. Kem	1947–1953	1	Missouri	Republican	1890–1965
Dirk Kempthorne	1993–1999	3	Idaho	Republican	1951–2026
John B. Kendrick	1917–1933	1	Wyoming	Democratic	1857–1933
John E. Kenna	1883–1893	2	West Virginia	Democratic	1848–1893
Anthony Kennedy	1857–1863	1	Maryland	American	1810–1892
John F. Kennedy	1953–1960	1	Massachusetts	Democratic	1917–1963
Robert F. Kennedy	1965–1968	1	New York	Democratic	1925–1968
Ted Kennedy	1962–2009	1	Massachusetts	Democratic	1932–2009
Richard R. Kenney	1897–1901	2	Delaware	Democratic	1856–1931
Joseph Kent	1833–1837	1	Maryland	Whig	1779–1837
William S. Kenyon	1911–1922	2	Iowa	Republican	1869–1933
John W. Kern	1911–1917	1	Indiana	Democratic	1849–1917
Francis Kernan	1875–1881	1	New York	Democratic	1816–1892
John Leeds Kerr	1841–1843	3	Maryland	Whig	1780–1844
Joseph Kerr	1814–1815	1	Ohio	Democratic-Republican	1765–1837
Robert S. Kerr	1949–1963	2	Oklahoma	Democratic	1896–1963
Bob Kerrey	1989–2001	1	Nebraska	Democratic	1943–present
John Kerry	1985–2013	2	Massachusetts	Democratic	1943–present
David M. Key	1875–1877	1	Tennessee	Democratic	1824–1900
Henry W. Keyes	1919–1937	2	New Hampshire	Republican	1862–1938
Harley M. Kilgore	1941–1956	1	West Virginia	Democratic	1893–1956
John Pendleton King	1833–1837	2	Georgia	Democratic	1799–1888
Preston King	1857–1863	1	New York	Republican	1806–1865
Rufus King	1789–1796; 1813–1825	3	New York	Federalist	1755–1827
William H. King	1917–1941	1	Utah	Democratic	1863–1949
William R. King	1819–1844; 1848–1852	2; 3	Alabama	Democratic	1786–1853
William F. Kirby	1916–1921	3	Arkansas	Democratic	1867–1934
Mark Kirk	2010–2017	3	Illinois	Republican	1959–present
Paul G. Kirk	2009–2010	1	Massachusetts	Democratic	1938–present
Samuel J. Kirkwood	1866–1867; 1877–1881	3; 2	Iowa	Republican	1813–1894
Aaron Kitchell	1805–1809	2	New Jersey	Democratic-Republican	1744–1820
Alfred B. Kittredge	1901–1909	3	South Dakota	Republican	1861–1911
Nehemiah R. Knight	1821–1824; 1824–1832; 1832–1841	2	Rhode Island	Democratic-Republican; National Republican; Whig	1780–1854
William Knowland	1945–1959	1	California	Republican	1908–1974
Philander C. Knox	1904–1909; 1917–1921	1	Pennsylvania	Republican	1853–1921
Herb Kohl	1989–2013	1	Wisconsin	Democratic	1935–2023
Bob Krueger	1993	1	Texas	Democratic	1935–2022
Thomas Kuchel	1953–1969	3	California	Republican	1910–1994
Jon Kyl	1995–2013; 2018	1; 3	Arizona	Republican	1942–2026
James H. Kyle	1891–1901	3	South Dakota	Populist	1854–1901
Robert M. La Follette	1906–1925	1	Wisconsin	Republican	1855–1925
Robert M. La Follette Jr.	1925–1934; 1934–1947	1	Wisconsin	Republican; Progressive	1895–1953
Abner Lacock	1813–1819	3	Pennsylvania	Democratic-Republican	1770–1837
Edwin F. Ladd	1921–1925	3	North Dakota	Republican	1859–1925
William Laird III	1956	1	West Virginia	Democratic	1916–1974
Lucius Quintus Cincinnatus Lamar	1877–1885	2	Mississippi	Democratic	1825–1893
John Lambert	1809–1815	1	New Jersey	Democratic-Republican	1746–1823
Mary Landrieu	1997–2015	2	Louisiana	Democratic	1955–present
Harry Lane	1913–1917	2	Oregon	Democratic	1855–1917
Henry S. Lane	1861–1867	3	Indiana	Republican	1811–1881
Jim Lane	1861–1866	2	Kansas	Republican	1814–1866
Joseph Lane	1859–1861	3	Oregon	Democratic	1801–1881
John Langdon	1789–1793; 1793–1801	3	New Hampshire	Federalist; Democratic-Republican	1741–1819
William Langer	1941–1959	1	North Dakota	Republican	1886–1959
James Lanman	1819–1825	3	Connecticut	Democratic-Republican	1767–1841
Elbridge G. Lapham	1881–1885	3	New York	Republican	1814–1890
Octaviano Ambrosio Larrazolo	1928–1929	1	New Mexico	Republican	1859–1930
Milton Latham	1860–1863	1	California	Democratic	1827–1882
Asbury Latimer	1903–1908	3	South Carolina	Democratic	1851–1908
Henry Latimer	1795–1801	1	Delaware	Federalist	1752–1819
John Laurance	1796–1800	3	New York	Federalist	1750–1810
Frank Lausche	1957–1969	3	Ohio	Democratic	1895–1990
Frank Lautenberg	1982–2001; 2003–2013	1; 2	New Jersey	Democratic	1924–2013
Paul Laxalt	1974–1987	3	Nevada	Republican	1922–2018
Luke Lea	1911–1917	1	Tennessee	Democratic	1879–1945
Edward L. Leahy	1949–1950	1	Rhode Island	Democratic	1886–1953
Patrick Leahy	1975–2023	3	Vermont	Democratic	1940–present
Walter Leake	1817–1820	1	Mississippi	Democratic-Republican	1762–1825
Blair Lee I	1914–1917	1	Maryland	Democratic	1857–1944
Joshua B. Lee	1937–1943	2	Oklahoma	Democratic	1892–1967
Richard Henry Lee	1789–1792	2	Virginia	Democratic-Republican	1732–1794
Herbert H. Lehman	1950–1957	3	New York	Democratic	1878–1963
Michael Leib	1809–1814	1	Pennsylvania	Democratic-Republican	1760–1822
Benjamin W. Leigh	1834–1836	2	Virginia	National Republican	1781–1849
George LeMieux	2009–2011	3	Florida	Republican	1969–present
Alton Lennon	1953–1954	2	North Carolina	Democratic	1906–1986
Irvine Lenroot	1918–1927	3	Wisconsin	Republican	1869–1949
Carl Levin	1979–2015	2	Michigan	Democratic	1934–2021
Dixon H. Lewis	1844–1848	2	Alabama	Democratic	1802–1848
J. Hamilton Lewis	1913–1919; 1931–1939	2	Illinois	Democratic	1863–1939
John F. Lewis	1870–1875	1	Virginia	Republican	1818–1895
Joe Lieberman	1989–2006; 2006–2013	1	Connecticut	Democratic; Independent Democrat	1942–2024
Blanche Lincoln	1999–2011	3	Arkansas	Democratic	1960–present
William Lindsay	1893–1901	2	Kentucky	Democratic	1835–1909
Lewis F. Linn	1833–1843	3	Missouri	Democratic	1796–1843
Henry F. Lippitt	1911–1917	1	Rhode Island	Republican	1856–1933
Samuel Livermore	1793–1801	2	New Hampshire	Federalist	1732–1803
Edward Livingston	1829–1831	2	Louisiana	Democratic	1764–1836
Edward Lloyd	1819–1824; 1824–1826	3	Maryland	Democratic-Republican; Democratic	1779–1834
James Lloyd	1797–1800	3	Maryland	Federalist	1745–1820
James Lloyd	1808–1813; 1822–1824; 1824–1826	1; 2; 2	Massachusetts	Federalist; National Republican; National Republican	1769–1831
Cyrus Locher	1928	3	Ohio	Democratic	1878–1929
Francis Locke Jr.	1814–1815	3	North Carolina	Democratic-Republican	1776–1823
Henry Cabot Lodge	1893–1924	1	Massachusetts	Republican	1850–1924
Henry Cabot Lodge Jr.	1937–1944; 1947–1953	2; 1	Massachusetts	Republican	1902–1985
Kelly Loeffler	2020–2021	3	Georgia	Republican	1970–present
Scott Loftin	1936	1	Florida	Democratic	1878–1953
George Logan	1801–1807	3	Pennsylvania	Democratic-Republican	1753–1821
John A. Logan	1871–1877; 1879–1886	2; 3	Illinois	Republican	1826–1886
M. M. Logan	1931–1939	2	Kentucky	Democratic	1874–1939
William Logan	1819–1820	3	Kentucky	Democratic-Republican	1776–1822
Augustine Lonergan	1933–1939	3	Connecticut	Democratic	1874–1947
Chester I. Long	1903–1909	3	Kansas	Republican	1860–1934
Edward V. Long	1960–1968	3	Missouri	Democratic	1908–1972
Huey Long	1932–1935	2	Louisiana	Democratic	1893–1935
Oren E. Long	1959–1963	3	Hawaii	Democratic	1889–1965
Rose McConnell Long	1936–1937	2	Louisiana	Democratic	1892–1970
Russell B. Long	1948–1987	3	Louisiana	Democratic	1918–2003
William Lorimer	1909–1912	3	Illinois	Republican	1861–1934
Trent Lott	1989–2007	1	Mississippi	Republican	1941–present
Walter Lowrie	1819–1825	3	Pennsylvania	Democratic-Republican	1784–1868
Scott W. Lucas	1939–1951	3	Illinois	Democratic	1892–1968
Richard Lugar	1977–2013	1	Indiana	Republican	1932–2019
Alva M. Lumpkin	1941	2	South Carolina	Democratic	1886–1941
Wilson Lumpkin	1837–1841	2	Georgia	Democratic	1783–1870
Ernest Lundeen	1937–1940	2	Minnesota	Farmer–Labor	1878–1940
Hall S. Lusk	1960	2	Oregon	Democratic	1883–1983
Lucius Lyon	1837–1839	1	Michigan	Democratic	1800–1851
Willis B. Machen	1872–1873	3	Kentucky	Democratic	1810–1893
Connie Mack III	1989–2001	1	Florida	Republican	1940–present
Samuel Maclay	1803–1809	1	Pennsylvania	Democratic-Republican	1741–1811
William Maclay	1789–1791	1	Pennsylvania	Democratic-Republican	1737–1804
Nathaniel Macon	1815–1824; 1824–1828	3	North Carolina	Democratic-Republican; Democratic	1757–1837
Warren Magnuson	1944–1981	3	Washington	Democratic	1905–1989
Allan B. Magruder	1812–1813	3	Louisiana	Democratic-Republican	1775–1822
William Mahone	1881–1887	1	Virginia	Readjuster	1826–1895
Francis Malbone	1809	1	Rhode Island	Federalist	1759–1809
Stephen Mallory	1851–1861	1	Florida	Democratic	1812–1873
Stephen Mallory II	1897–1907	3	Florida	Democratic	1848–1907
George W. Malone	1947–1959	1	Nevada	Republican	1890–1961
Francis T. Maloney	1935–1945	1	Connecticut	Democratic	1894–1945
Joe Manchin	2010–2025	1	West Virginia	Democratic; Independent	1947–present
Charles F. Manderson	1883–1895	2	Nebraska	Republican	1837–1911
Willie P. Mangum	1831–1833; 1833–1836; 1840–1853	3; 3; 2	North Carolina	Democratic; National Republican; Whig	1792–1861
Mike Mansfield	1953–1977	1	Montana	Democratic	1903–2001
Lee Mantle	1895–1896; 1896–1899	1	Montana	Republican; Silver Republican	1851–1934
William L. Marcy	1831–1833	3	New York	Democratic	1786–1857
William Marks	1825–1831	3	Pennsylvania	National Republican	1778–1858
Humphrey Marshall	1795–1801	3	Kentucky	Federalist	1760–1841
Gilman Marston	1889	2	New Hampshire	Republican	1811–1890
Alexander Martin	1793–1799	2	North Carolina	Democratic-Republican	1740–1807
Edward Martin	1947–1959	1	Pennsylvania	Republican	1879–1967
George B. Martin	1918–1919	2	Kentucky	Democratic	1876–1945
John Martin	1893–1895	2	Kansas	Democratic	1833–1913
Thomas E. Martin	1955–1961	2	Iowa	Republican	1893–1971
Thomas S. Martin	1895–1919	2	Virginia	Democratic	1847–1919
James E. Martine	1911–1917	1	New Jersey	Democratic	1850–1925
Mel Martínez	2005–2009	3	Florida	Republican	1946–present
Armistead Thomson Mason	1816–1817	2	Virginia	Democratic-Republican	1787–1819
James M. Mason	1847–1861	1	Virginia	Democratic	1798–1871
Jeremiah Mason	1813–1817	3	New Hampshire	Federalist	1768–1848
Jonathan Mason	1800–1803	1	Massachusetts	Federalist	1756–1831
Stevens Thomson Mason	1794–1803	1	Virginia	Democratic-Republican	1760–1803
William E. Mason	1897–1903	3	Illinois	Republican	1850–1921
William A. Massey	1912–1913	1	Nevada	Republican	1856–1914
Harlan Mathews	1993–1994	2	Tennessee	Democratic	1927–2014
Elisha Mathewson	1807–1811	2	Rhode Island	Democratic-Republican	1767–1853
Charles Mathias	1969–1987	3	Maryland	Republican	1922–2010
Spark Matsunaga	1977–1990	1	Hawaii	Democratic	1916–1990
Stanley Matthews	1877–1879	3	Ohio	Republican	1824–1889
Mack Mattingly	1981–1987	3	Georgia	Republican	1931–present
Samuel B. Maxey	1875–1887	1	Texas	Democratic	1825–1895
Burnet R. Maybank	1941–1954	2	South Carolina	Democratic	1899–1954
Earle B. Mayfield	1923–1929	1	Texas	Democratic	1881–1964
William Gibbs McAdoo	1933–1938	3	California	Democratic	1863–1941
George W. McBride	1895–1901	2	Oregon	Republican	1854–1911
John McCain	1987–2018	3	Arizona	Republican	1936–2018
Pat McCarran	1933–1954	3	Nevada	Democratic	1876–1954
Eugene McCarthy	1959–1971	1	Minnesota	Democratic	1916–2005
Joseph McCarthy	1947–1957	1	Wisconsin	Republican	1908–1957
Claire McCaskill	2007–2019	1	Missouri	Democratic	1953–present
John L. McClellan	1943–1977	2	Arkansas	Democratic	1896–1977
Jim McClure	1973–1991	2	Idaho	Republican	1924–2011
Louis E. McComas	1899–1905	1	Maryland	Republican	1846–1907
William J. McConnell	1890–1891	3	Idaho	Republican	1839–1925
Medill McCormick	1919–1925	2	Illinois	Republican	1877–1925
James B. McCreary	1903–1909	3	Kentucky	Democratic	1838–1918
Thomas C. McCreery	1868–1871; 1873–1879	2; 3	Kentucky	Democratic	1816–1890
Roscoe C. McCulloch	1929–1930	3	Ohio	Republican	1880–1958
Porter J. McCumber	1899–1923	1	North Dakota	Republican	1858–1933
James W. McDill	1881–1883	2	Iowa	Republican	1834–1894
Alexander McDonald	1868–1871	2	Arkansas	Republican	1832–1903
Joseph E. McDonald	1875–1881	1	Indiana	Democratic	1819–1891
James A. McDougall	1861–1867	3	California	Democratic	1817–1867
George McDuffie	1842–1846	3	South Carolina	Democratic	1790–1851
Samuel D. McEnery	1897–1910	3	Louisiana	Democratic	1837–1910
Ernest McFarland	1941–1953	1	Arizona	Democratic	1894–1984
Gale W. McGee	1959–1977	1	Wyoming	Democratic	1915–1992
George McGill	1930–1939	3	Kansas	Democratic	1879–1963
George McGovern	1963–1981	3	South Dakota	Democratic	1922–2012
J. Howard McGrath	1947–1949	1	Rhode Island	Democratic	1903–1966
Joseph McIlvaine	1823–1824; 1824–1826	1	New Jersey	Democratic-Republican; National Republican	1769–1826
Thomas J. McIntyre	1962–1979	2	New Hampshire	Democratic	1915–1992
Samuel McKean	1833–1839	1	Pennsylvania	Democratic	1787–1841
Kenneth McKellar	1917–1953	1	Tennessee	Democratic	1869–1957
John McKinley	1826–1831; 1837	3	Alabama	Democratic	1780–1852
William B. McKinley	1921–1926	3	Illinois	Republican	1856–1926
Louis McLane	1827–1829	1	Delaware	Democratic	1786–1857
Anselm J. McLaurin	1894–1895; 1901–1909	2	Mississippi	Democratic	1848–1909
John L. McLaurin	1897–1903	3	South Carolina	Democratic	1860–1934
George P. McLean	1911–1929	1	Connecticut	Republican	1857–1932
John McLean	1824–1825; 1829–1830	3; 2	Illinois	Democratic	1791–1830
Brien McMahon	1945–1952	3	Connecticut	Democratic	1903–1952
William H. McMaster	1925–1931	2	South Dakota	Republican	1877–1968
James McMillan	1889–1902	2	Michigan	Republican	1838–1902
Samuel J. R. McMillan	1875–1887	1	Minnesota	Republican	1826–1897
Patrick V. McNamara	1955–1966	2	Michigan	Democratic	1894–1966
Charles L. McNary	1917–1918; 1918–1944	2	Oregon	Republican	1874–1944
John R. McPherson	1877–1895	2	New Jersey	Democratic	1833–1897
John J. McRae	1851–1852	1	Mississippi	Democratic	1815–1868
Samuel McRoberts	1841–1843	2	Illinois	Democratic	1799–1843
Martha McSally	2019–2020	3	Arizona	Republican	1966–present
James M. Mead	1938–1947	1	New York	Democratic	1885–1964
Rice W. Means	1924–1927	3	Colorado	Republican	1877–1949
Edwin L. Mechem	1962–1964	1	New Mexico	Republican	1912–2002
Return J. Meigs Jr.	1808–1810	1	Ohio	Democratic-Republican	1764–1825
John Melcher	1977–1989	1	Montana	Democratic	1924–2018
Prentiss Mellen	1818–1820	1	Massachusetts	Federalist	1764–1840
Bob Menendez	2006–2024	1	New Jersey	Democratic	1954–present
David Meriwether	1852	3	Kentucky	Democratic	1800–1893
William Duhurst Merrick	1838–1845	1	Maryland	Whig	1793–1857
Augustus Summerfield Merrimon	1873–1879	3	North Carolina	Democratic	1830–1892
Jesse H. Metcalf	1924–1937	2	Rhode Island	Republican	1860–1942
Lee Metcalf	1961–1978	2	Montana	Democratic	1911–1978
Thomas Metcalfe	1848–1849	3	Kentucky	Whig	1780–1855
Howard Metzenbaum	1974; 1976–1995	3; 1	Ohio	Democratic	1917–2008
Barbara Mikulski	1987–2017	3	Maryland	Democratic	1936–present
Joseph Millard	1901–1907	2	Nebraska	Republican	1836–1922
John Milledge	1806–1809	3	Georgia	Democratic-Republican	1757–1818
Bert H. Miller	1949	2	Idaho	Democratic	1879–1949
Homer V. M. Miller	1869–1871	2	Georgia	Democratic	1814–1896
Jack Miller	1961–1973	2	Iowa	Republican	1916–1994
Jacob W. Miller	1841–1853	2	New Jersey	Whig	1800–1862
John E. Miller	1937–1941	2	Arkansas	Democratic	1888–1981
John Franklin Miller	1881–1886	1	California	Republican	1831–1886
Stephen Decatur Miller	1831–1833	3	South Carolina	Nullifier	1787–1838
Warner Miller	1881–1887	1	New York	Republican	1838–1918
Zell Miller	2000–2005	3	Georgia	Democratic	1932–2018
Eugene Millikin	1941–1957	3	Colorado	Republican	1891–1958
Elijah H. Mills	1820–1824; 1824–1827	1	Massachusetts	Federalist; National Republican	1776–1829
Roger Q. Mills	1892–1899	1	Texas	Democratic	1832–1911
John Milton	1938	1	New Jersey	Democratic	1881–1977
William Hall Milton	1908–1909	3	Florida	Democratic	1864–1942
Sherman Minton	1935–1941	1	Indiana	Democratic	1890–1965
Charles B. Mitchel	1861	3	Arkansas	Democratic	1815–1864
George J. Mitchell	1980–1995	1	Maine	Democratic	1933–present
Hugh Mitchell	1945–1946	1	Washington	Democratic	1907–1996
John H. Mitchell	1873–1879; 1885–1897; 1901–1905	3; 3; 2	Oregon	Republican	1835–1905
John I. Mitchell	1881–1887	1	Pennsylvania	Republican	1838–1907
John L. Mitchell	1893–1899	1	Wisconsin	Democratic	1842–1904
Stephen Mix Mitchell	1793–1795	3	Connecticut	Federalist	1743–1835
Samuel L. Mitchill	1804–1809	1	New York	Democratic-Republican	1764–1831
Walter Mondale	1964–1976	2	Minnesota	Democratic	1928–2021
Hernando Money	1897–1911	1	Mississippi	Democratic	1839–1912
James Monroe	1790–1794	1	Virginia	Democratic-Republican	1758–1831
Mike Monroney	1951–1969	3	Oklahoma	Democratic	1902–1980
Joseph Montoya	1964–1977	1	New Mexico	Democratic	1915–1978
Blair Moody	1951–1952	1	Michigan	Democratic	1902–1954
Gideon C. Moody	1889–1891	3	South Dakota	Republican	1832–1904
Wyman B. S. Moor	1848	1	Maine	Democratic	1811–1869
A. Harry Moore	1935–1938	1	New Jersey	Democratic	1879–1952
Andrew Moore	1804; 1804–1809	2; 1	Virginia	Democratic-Republican	1752–1821
Edward H. Moore	1943–1949	2	Oklahoma	Republican	1871–1950
Gabriel Moore	1831–1833; 1833–1837	3	Alabama	Democratic; National Republican	1785–1845
James T. Morehead	1841–1847	2	Kentucky	Whig	1797–1854
Edwin D. Morgan	1863–1869	1	New York	Republican	1811–1883
John T. Morgan	1877–1907	2	Alabama	Democratic	1824–1907
Robert B. Morgan	1975–1981	3	North Carolina	Democratic	1925–2016
David L. Morril	1817–1823	2	New Hampshire	Democratic-Republican	1772–1849
Justin S. Morrill	1867–1898	3	Vermont	Republican	1810–1898
Lot M. Morrill	1861–1869; 1869–1876	1; 2	Maine	Republican	1813–1883
Gouverneur Morris	1800–1803	1	New York	Federalist	1752–1816
Robert Morris	1789–1795	3	Pennsylvania	Federalist	1734–1806
Thomas Morris	1833–1839	1	Ohio	Democratic	1776–1844
Cameron A. Morrison	1930–1932	3	North Carolina	Democratic	1869–1953
Dwight Morrow	1930–1931	2	New Jersey	Republican	1873–1931
Jeremiah Morrow	1813–1819	3	Ohio	Democratic-Republican	1771–1852
Wayne Morse	1945–1952; 1952–1955; 1955–1969	3	Oregon	Republican; Independent; Democratic	1900–1974
Jackson Morton	1849–1855	3	Florida	Whig	1794–1874
Oliver P. Morton	1867–1877	3	Indiana	Republican	1823–1877
Thruston Morton	1957–1968	3	Kentucky	Republican	1907–1982
Carol Moseley Braun	1993–1999	3	Illinois	Democratic	1947–present
George H. Moses	1918–1933	3	New Hampshire	Republican	1869–1944
John Moses	1945	3	North Dakota	Democratic	1885–1945
Frank Moss	1959–1977	1	Utah	Democratic	1911–2003
Alexandre Mouton	1837–1842	3	Louisiana	Democratic	1804–1885
Daniel Patrick Moynihan	1977–2001	1	New York	Democratic	1927–2003
Peter Muhlenberg	1801	3	Pennsylvania	Democratic-Republican	1746–1807
Frederick W. Mulkey	1907; 1918	2	Oregon	Republican	1874–1924
Markwayne Mullin	2023–2026	2	Oklahoma	Republican	1977–present
Karl Mundt	1948–1973	2	South Dakota	Republican	1900–1974
Abe Murdock	1941–1947	1	Utah	Democratic	1893–1979
Frank Murkowski	1981–2002	3	Alaska	Republican	1933–present
Edward Murphy Jr.	1893–1899	1	New York	Democratic	1834–1911
George Murphy	1965–1971	1	California	Republican	1902–1992
Louis Murphy	1933–1936	3	Iowa	Democratic	1875–1936
Maurice J. Murphy Jr.	1961–1962	2	New Hampshire	Republican	1927–2002
James E. Murray	1934–1961	2	Montana	Democratic	1876–1961
Edmund Muskie	1959–1980	1	Maine	Democratic	1914–1996
Francis J. Myers	1945–1951	3	Pennsylvania	Democratic	1901–1956
Henry L. Myers	1911–1923	1	Montana	Democratic	1862–1943
Arnold Naudain	1830–1836	1	Delaware	National Republican	1790–1872
Matthew M. Neely	1923–1929; 1931–1941; 1949–1958	1; 2; 2	West Virginia	Democratic	1874–1958
Arthur E. Nelson	1942–1943	2	Minnesota	Republican	1892–1955
Ben Nelson	2001–2013	1	Nebraska	Democratic	1941–present
Bill Nelson	2001–2019	1	Florida	Democratic	1942–present
Gaylord Nelson	1963–1981	3	Wisconsin	Democratic	1916–2005
Knute Nelson	1895–1923	2	Minnesota	Republican	1843–1923
James Nesmith	1861–1867	3	Oregon	Democratic	1820–1885
Maurine Neuberger	1960–1967	2	Oregon	Democratic	1907–2000
Richard L. Neuberger	1955–1960	2	Oregon	Democratic	1912–1960
Harry S. New	1917–1923	1	Indiana	Republican	1858–1937
Truman H. Newberry	1919–1922	2	Michigan	Republican	1864–1945
Francis G. Newlands	1903–1917	3	Nevada	Democratic	1846–1917
Robert C. Nicholas	1836–1841	2	Louisiana	Democratic	1787–1856
Wilson Cary Nicholas	1799–1804	2	Virginia	Democratic-Republican	1761–1820
Alfred O. P. Nicholson	1840–1842; 1859–1861	1; 2	Tennessee	Democratic	1808–1876
Samuel D. Nicholson	1921–1923	3	Colorado	Republican	1859–1923
Don Nickles	1981–2005	3	Oklahoma	Republican	1948–present
John Milton Niles	1835–1839; 1843–1849	1; 3	Connecticut	Democratic	1787–1856
George S. Nixon	1905–1912	1	Nevada	Republican	1860–1912
Richard Nixon	1950–1953	3	California	Republican	1913–1994
James Noble	1816–1831	1	Indiana	National Republican	1785–1831
Peter Norbeck	1921–1936	3	South Dakota	Republican	1870–1936
George W. Norris	1913–1936; 1936–1943	2	Nebraska	Republican; Independent	1861–1944
Moses Norris Jr.	1849–1855	3	New Hampshire	Democratic	1799–1855
William North	1798	1	New York	Federalist	1755–1836
Daniel Sheldon Norton	1865–1870	2	Minnesota	Republican	1829–1870
John Norvell	1837–1841	2	Michigan	Democratic	1789–1850
Thomas M. Norwood	1871–1877	2	Georgia	Democratic	1830–1913
Amos Nourse	1857	1	Maine	Republican	1794–1877
John F. Nugent	1918–1921	3	Idaho	Democratic	1868–1931
Sam Nunn	1972–1997	2	Georgia	Democratic	1938–present
Gerald Nye	1925–1945	3	North Dakota	Republican	1892–1971
James W. Nye	1864–1873	3	Nevada	Republican	1815–1876
Herbert O'Conor	1947–1953	1	Maryland	Democratic	1896–1960
W. Lee O'Daniel	1941–1949	2	Texas	Democratic	1890–1969
James A. O'Gorman	1911–1917	1	New York	Democratic	1860–1943
Joseph C. O'Mahoney	1934–1953; 1954–1961	1; 2	Wyoming	Democratic	1884–1962
Barack Obama	2005–2008	3	Illinois	Democratic	1961–present
Tasker Oddie	1921–1933	3	Nevada	Republican	1870–1950
Aaron Ogden	1801–1803	1	New Jersey	Federalist	1756–1839
Richard J. Oglesby	1873–1879	3	Illinois	Republican	1824–1899
Simeon Olcott	1801–1805	2	New Hampshire	Federalist	1735–1815
George T. Oliver	1909–1917	1	Pennsylvania	Republican	1848–1919
Thomas W. Osborn	1868–1873	3	Florida	Republican	1833–1898
Harrison Gray Otis	1817–1822	2	Massachusetts	Federalist	1765–1848
Lee S. Overman	1903–1930	3	North Carolina	Democratic	1854–1930
John H. Overton	1933–1948	3	Louisiana	Democratic	1875–1948
Robert L. Owen	1907–1925	2	Oklahoma	Democratic	1856–1947
Bob Packwood	1969–1995	3	Oregon	Republican	1932–2026
Algernon Paddock	1875–1881; 1887–1893	1	Nebraska	Republican	1830–1897
Carroll S. Page	1908–1923	1	Vermont	Republican	1843–1925
John Page	1836–1837	3	New Hampshire	Democratic	1787–1865
Elijah Paine	1795–1801	3	Vermont	Federalist	1757–1842
John M. Palmer	1891–1897	3	Illinois	Democratic	1817–1900
Thomas W. Palmer	1883–1889	2	Michigan	Republican	1830–1913
William A. Palmer	1818–1824; 1824–1825	3	Vermont	Democratic-Republican; National Republican	1781–1860
Nahum Parker	1807–1810	3	New Hampshire	Democratic-Republican	1760–1839
Richard E. Parker	1836–1837	2	Virginia	Democratic	1783–1840
Albion Parris	1827–1828	1	Maine	Democratic	1788–1857
John F. Parrott	1819–1824; 1824–1825	3	New Hampshire	Democratic-Republican; National Republican	1767–1836
Frank C. Partridge	1930–1931	1	Vermont	Republican	1861–1943
Samuel Pasco	1887–1899	1	Florida	Democratic	1834–1917
John Pastore	1950–1976	1	Rhode Island	Democratic	1907–2000
William Paterson	1789–1790	2	New Jersey	Federalist	1745–1806
David T. Patterson	1866–1869	1	Tennessee	Democratic	1818–1891
James W. Patterson	1867–1873	3	New Hampshire	Republican	1823–1893
John J. Patterson	1873–1879	3	South Carolina	Republican	1830–1912
Roscoe C. Patterson	1929–1935	1	Missouri	Republican	1876–1954
Thomas M. Patterson	1901–1907	2	Colorado	Democratic	1839–1916
John Patton Jr.	1894–1895	1	Michigan	Republican	1850–1907
Frederick G. Payne	1953–1959	1	Maine	Republican	1904–1978
Henry B. Payne	1885–1891	3	Ohio	Democratic	1810–1896
Thomas H. Paynter	1907–1913	2	Kentucky	Democratic	1851–1921
Roger C. Peace	1941	2	South Carolina	Democratic	1899–1968
James Pearce	1843–1856; 1856–1862	3	Maryland	Whig; Democratic	1805–1862
James B. Pearson	1962–1978	2	Kansas	Republican	1920–2009
Henry R. Pease	1874–1875	1	Mississippi	Republican	1835–1907
William A. Peffer	1891–1897	3	Kansas	Populist	1831–1912
Claiborne Pell	1961–1997	2	Rhode Island	Democratic	1918–2009
George H. Pendleton	1879–1885	3	Ohio	Democratic	1825–1889
Isaac S. Pennybacker	1845–1847	1	Virginia	Democratic	1805–1847
Boies Penrose	1897–1921	3	Pennsylvania	Republican	1860–1921
Claude Pepper	1936–1951	3	Florida	Democratic	1900–1989
George W. Pepper	1922–1927	3	Pennsylvania	Republican	1867–1961
Charles H. Percy	1967–1985	2	Illinois	Republican	1919–2011
LeRoy Percy	1910–1913	2	Mississippi	Democratic	1860–1929
David Perdue	2015–2021	2	Georgia	Republican	1949–present
Bishop W. Perkins	1892–1893	2	Kansas	Republican	1841–1894
George C. Perkins	1893–1915	3	California	Republican	1839–1923
Kirtland I. Perky	1912–1913	3	Idaho	Democratic	1867–1939
Richard F. Pettigrew	1889–1896; 1896–1901	2	South Dakota	Republican; Silver Republican	1848–1926
John Pettit	1853–1855	3	Indiana	Democratic	1807–1877
Edmund Pettus	1897–1907	3	Alabama	Democratic	1821–1907
James D. Phelan	1915–1921	3	California	Democratic	1861–1930
Samuel S. Phelps	1839–1851; 1853–1854	1; 3	Vermont	Whig	1793–1855
Lawrence C. Phipps	1919–1931	2	Colorado	Republican	1862–1958
Israel Pickens	1826	3	Alabama	Democratic	1780–1827
Timothy Pickering	1803–1811	2	Massachusetts	Federalist	1745–1829
Franklin Pierce	1837–1842	3	New Hampshire	Democratic	1804–1869
Gilbert A. Pierce	1889–1891	3	North Dakota	Republican	1839–1901
Austin F. Pike	1883–1886	2	New Hampshire	Republican	1819–1886
Samuel H. Piles	1905–1911	1	Washington	Republican	1858–1940
Charles Pinckney	1798–1801	2	South Carolina	Democratic-Republican	1754–1824
William B. Pine	1925–1931	2	Oklahoma	Republican	1877–1942
William Pinkney	1819–1822	1	Maryland	Democratic-Republican	1764–1822
Key Pittman	1913–1940	1	Nevada	Democratic	1872–1940
Orville H. Platt	1879–1905	3	Connecticut	Republican	1827–1905
Thomas C. Platt	1881; 1897–1909	1; 3	New York	Republican	1833–1910
James Pleasants	1819–1822	2	Virginia	Democratic-Republican	1769–1836
Preston B. Plumb	1877–1891	2	Kansas	Republican	1837–1891
William Plumer	1802–1807	3	New Hampshire	Federalist	1759–1850
George Poindexter	1830–1831; 1831–1835	2	Mississippi	Democratic; National Republican	1779–1853
Miles Poindexter	1911–1913; 1913–1915; 1915–1923	1	Washington	Republican; Progressive; Republican	1868–1946
Luke P. Poland	1865–1867	3	Vermont	Republican	1815–1887
Trusten Polk	1857–1862	1	Missouri	Democratic	1811–1876
William P. Pollock	1918–1919	2	South Carolina	Democratic	1870–1922
Atlee Pomerene	1911–1923	1	Ohio	Democratic	1863–1937
Samuel C. Pomeroy	1861–1873	3	Kansas	Republican	1816–1891
John Pool	1868–1873	3	North Carolina	Republican	1826–1884
James P. Pope	1933–1939	3	Idaho	Democratic	1884–1966
John Pope	1807–1813	3	Kentucky	Democratic-Republican	1770–1845
Alexander Porter	1833–1836; 1836–1837; 1843–1844	3	Louisiana	National Republican; Whig; Whig	1785–1844
Augustus Seymour Porter	1840–1845	1	Michigan	Whig	1798–1872
Rob Portman	2011–2023	3	Ohio	Republican	1955–present
Thomas Posey	1812–1813	2	Louisiana	Democratic-Republican	1750–1818
Charles E. Potter	1952–1959	1	Michigan	Republican	1916–1979
Samuel J. Potter	1803–1804	1	Rhode Island	Democratic-Republican	1753–1804
Richard Potts	1793–1796	1	Maryland	Federalist	1753–1808
Lazarus Powell	1859–1865	2	Kentucky	Democratic	1812–1867
Thomas C. Power	1890–1895	2	Montana	Republican	1839–1923
Daniel D. Pratt	1869–1875	1	Indiana	Republican	1813–1877
Thomas Pratt	1850–1856; 1856–1857	1	Maryland	Whig; Democratic	1804–1869
Samuel Prentiss	1831–1836; 1836–1842	3	Vermont	National Republican; Whig	1782–1857
Larry Pressler	1979–1997	2	South Dakota	Republican	1942–present
William C. Preston	1833–1837; 1837–1842	3	South Carolina	Nullifier; Whig	1794–1860
Samuel Price	1876–1877	1	West Virginia	Democratic	1805–1884
Oliver H. Prince	1828–1829	2	Georgia	Democratic	1787–1837
Jeter C. Pritchard	1895–1903	3	North Carolina	Republican	1857–1921
Redfield Proctor	1891–1908	1	Vermont	Republican	1831–1908
Winston L. Prouty	1959–1971	1	Vermont	Republican	1906–1971
William Proxmire	1957–1989	1	Wisconsin	Democratic	1915–2005
David Pryor	1979–1997	2	Arkansas	Democratic	1934–2024
Luke Pryor	1880	3	Alabama	Democratic	1820–1900
Mark Pryor	2003–2015	2	Arkansas	Democratic	1963–present
George E. Pugh	1855–1861	3	Ohio	Democratic	1822–1876
James L. Pugh	1880–1897	3	Alabama	Democratic	1820–1907
William E. Purcell	1910–1911	3	North Dakota	Democratic	1856–1928
William A. Purtell	1952; 1953–1959	3; 1	Connecticut	Republican	1897–1978
Gladys Pyle	1938–1939	3	South Dakota	Republican	1890–1989
Joseph V. Quarles	1899–1905	1	Wisconsin	Republican	1843–1911
Matthew Quay	1887–1899; 1901–1904	1	Pennsylvania	Republican	1833–1904
Dan Quayle	1981–1989	3	Indiana	Republican	1947–present
George L. P. Radcliffe	1935–1947	1	Maryland	Democratic	1877–1974
Samuel M. Ralston	1923–1925	1	Indiana	Democratic	1857–1925
Alexander Ramsey	1863–1875	1	Minnesota	Republican	1815–1903
Jennings Randolph	1958–1985	2	West Virginia	Democratic	1902–1998
John Randolph	1825–1827	1	Virginia	Democratic	1773–1833
Theodore F. Randolph	1875–1881	1	New Jersey	Democratic	1826–1883
Joseph E. Ransdell	1913–1931	2	Louisiana	Democratic	1858–1954
Matt W. Ransom	1872–1895	2	North Carolina	Democratic	1826–1904
Robert Rantoul Jr.	1851	1	Massachusetts	Democratic	1805–1852
Joseph L. Rawlins	1897–1903	3	Utah	Democratic	1850–1926
Charles A. Rawson	1922	2	Iowa	Republican	1867–1936
Isidor Rayner	1905–1912	1	Maryland	Democratic	1850–1912
George Read	1789–1793	1	Delaware	Federalist	1733–1798
Jacob Read	1795–1801	3	South Carolina	Federalist	1752–1816
John H. Reagan	1887–1891	1	Texas	Democratic	1818–1905
Alfred E. Reames	1938	3	Oregon	Democratic	1870–1943
Clyde M. Reed	1939–1949	3	Kansas	Republican	1871–1949
David A. Reed	1922–1935	1	Pennsylvania	Republican	1880–1953
James A. Reed	1911–1929	1	Missouri	Democratic	1861–1944
Philip Reed	1806–1813	3	Maryland	Democratic-Republican	1760–1829
Thomas Buck Reed	1826–1827; 1829	1; 2	Mississippi	Democratic	1787–1829
David Settle Reid	1854–1859	2	North Carolina	Democratic	1813–1891
Harry Reid	1987–2017	3	Nevada	Democratic	1939–2021
Hiram R. Revels	1870–1871	2	Mississippi	Republican	1827–1901
Chapman Revercomb	1943–1949; 1956–1959	2; 1	West Virginia	Republican	1895–1979
Robert R. Reynolds	1932–1945	3	North Carolina	Democratic	1884–1963
Samuel W. Reynolds	1954	1	Nebraska	Republican	1890–1988
Robert Barnwell Rhett	1850–1852	2	South Carolina	Democratic	1800–1876
Abraham Ribicoff	1963–1981	3	Connecticut	Democratic	1910–1998
Benjamin F. Rice	1868–1872; 1872–1873	3	Arkansas	Republican; Liberal Republican	1828–1905
Henry M. Rice	1858–1863	1	Minnesota	Democratic	1816–1894
Harry A. Richardson	1907–1913	2	Delaware	Republican	1853–1928
William Alexander Richardson	1863–1865	2	Illinois	Democratic	1811–1875
George R. Riddle	1864–1867	1	Delaware	Democratic	1817–1867
Harrison H. Riddleberger	1883–1889	2	Virginia	Readjuster	1844–1890
Henry M. Ridgely	1827–1829	2	Delaware	Democratic	1779–1847
Donald Riegle	1976–1995	1	Michigan	Democratic	1938–2026
William Cabell Rives	1832–1834; 1836–1839; 1841–1845	2; 1; 1	Virginia	Democratic; Democratic; Whig	1793–1868
William N. Roach	1893–1899	1	North Dakota	Democratic	1840–1902
William H. Roane	1837–1841	2	Virginia	Democratic	1787–1845
Chuck Robb	1989–2001	1	Virginia	Democratic	1939–present
Asher Robbins	1825–1836; 1836–1839	1	Rhode Island	National Republican; Whig	1761–1845
Jonathan Roberts	1814–1821	1	Pennsylvania	Democratic-Republican	1771–1854
Pat Roberts	1997–2021	2	Kansas	Republican	1936–present
A. Willis Robertson	1946–1966	2	Virginia	Democratic	1887–1971
Edward V. Robertson	1943–1949	2	Wyoming	Republican	1881–1963
Thomas J. Robertson	1868–1877	2	South Carolina	Republican	1823–1897
Arthur Raymond Robinson	1925–1935	1	Indiana	Republican	1881–1961
John M. Robinson	1830–1841	2	Illinois	Democratic	1794–1843
Jonathan Robinson	1807–1815	1	Vermont	Democratic-Republican	1756–1819
Joseph T. Robinson	1913–1937	2	Arkansas	Democratic	1872–1937
Moses Robinson	1791–1797	1	Vermont	Democratic-Republican	1741–1813
John M. Robsion	1930	2	Kentucky	Republican	1873–1948
Jay Rockefeller	1985–2015	2	West Virginia	Democratic	1937–2026
Julius Rockwell	1854–1855	2	Massachusetts	Whig	1805–1888
Caesar Augustus Rodney	1822–1823	1	Delaware	Democratic-Republican	1772–1824
Daniel Rodney	1826–1827	2	Delaware	National Republican	1764–1846
Edward H. Rollins	1877–1883	2	New Hampshire	Republican	1824–1889
Mitt Romney	2019–2025	1	Utah	Republican	1947–present
Elihu Root	1909–1915	3	New York	Republican	1845–1937
Joseph Rosier	1941–1942	2	West Virginia	Democratic	1870–1951
Edmund G. Ross	1866–1871	2	Kansas	Republican	1826–1907
James Ross	1794–1803	1	Pennsylvania	Federalist	1762–1847
Jonathan Ross	1899–1900	3	Vermont	Republican	1826–1905
William Roth	1971–2001	1	Delaware	Republican	1921–2003
John Rowan	1825–1831	3	Kentucky	Democratic	1773–1843
Marco Rubio	2011–2025	3	Florida	Republican	1971–present
Warren Rudman	1981–1993	3	New Hampshire	Republican	1930–2012
Benjamin Ruggles	1815–1824; 1824–1833	1	Ohio	Democratic-Republican; National Republican	1783–1857
John Ruggles	1835–1841	2	Maine	Democratic	1789–1874
Thomas Jefferson Rusk	1846–1857	1	Texas	Democratic	1803–1857
Donald S. Russell	1965–1966	3	South Carolina	Democratic	1906–1998
Richard Russell Jr.	1933–1971	2	Georgia	Democratic	1897–1971
John Rutherfurd	1791–1798	1	New Jersey	Federalist	1760–1840
Dwight M. Sabin	1883–1889	2	Minnesota	Republican	1843–1902
Frederic M. Sackett	1925–1930	2	Kentucky	Republican	1868–1941
Ken Salazar	2005–2009	3	Colorado	Democratic	1955–present
Pierre Salinger	1964	1	California	Democratic	1925–2004
Leverett Saltonstall	1945–1967	2	Massachusetts	Republican	1892–1979
Newell Sanders	1912–1913	2	Tennessee	Republican	1850–1939
Wilbur F. Sanders	1890–1893	1	Montana	Republican	1834–1905
Nathan Sanford	1815–1821; 1826–1831	3	New York	Democratic-Republican; National Republican	1777–1838
Terry Sanford	1986–1993	3	North Carolina	Democratic	1917–1998
Rick Santorum	1995–2007	1	Pennsylvania	Republican	1958–present
Paul Sarbanes	1977–2007	1	Maryland	Democratic	1933–2020
Aaron A. Sargent	1873–1879	3	California	Republican	1827–1887
Ben Sasse	2015–2023	2	Nebraska	Republican	1972–present
Jim Sasser	1977–1995	1	Tennessee	Democratic	1936–2024
Eli Saulsbury	1871–1889	2	Delaware	Democratic	1817–1893
Willard Saulsbury Jr.	1913–1919	2	Delaware	Democratic	1861–1927
Willard Saulsbury Sr.	1859–1871	2	Delaware	Democratic	1820–1892
Alvin Saunders	1877–1883	2	Nebraska	Republican	1817–1899
Frederick A. Sawyer	1868–1873	3	South Carolina	Republican	1822–1891
Philetus Sawyer	1881–1893	1	Wisconsin	Republican	1816–1900
William B. Saxbe	1969–1974	3	Ohio	Republican	1916–2010
Thomas D. Schall	1925–1935	2	Minnesota	Republican	1878–1935
Harrison Schmitt	1977–1983	1	New Mexico	Republican	1935–present
Andrew Frank Schoeppel	1949–1962	2	Kansas	Republican	1894–1962
James Schureman	1799–1801	1	New Jersey	Federalist	1756–1824
Carl Schurz	1869–1871; 1871–1875	1	Missouri	Republican; Liberal Republican	1829–1906
Karl C. Schuyler	1932–1933	3	Colorado	Republican	1877–1933
Philip Schuyler	1789–1791; 1797–1798	1	New York	Federalist	1733–1804
Harry Schwartz	1937–1943	2	Wyoming	Democratic	1869–1955
Richard Schweiker	1969–1981	3	Pennsylvania	Republican	1926–2015
Lewis B. Schwellenbach	1935–1940	1	Washington	Democratic	1894–1948
Hugh Scott	1959–1977	1	Pennsylvania	Republican	1900–1994
John Scott	1869–1875	1	Pennsylvania	Republican	1824–1896
Nathan B. Scott	1899–1911	1	West Virginia	Republican	1842–1924
W. Kerr Scott	1954–1958	2	North Carolina	Democratic	1896–1958
William L. Scott	1973–1979	2	Virginia	Republican	1915–1997
James G. Scrugham	1942–1945	1	Nevada	Democratic	1880–1945
Fred A. Seaton	1951–1952	2	Nebraska	Republican	1909–1974
William K. Sebastian	1848–1861	2	Arkansas	Democratic	1812–1865
Theodore Sedgwick	1796–1799	2	Massachusetts	Federalist	1746–1813
James Semple	1843–1847	2	Illinois	Democratic	1798–1866
Jeff Sessions	1997–2017	2	Alabama	Republican	1946–present
Ambrose H. Sevier	1836–1848	3	Arkansas	Democratic	1801–1848
William H. Seward	1849–1855; 1855–1861	3	New York	Whig; Republican	1801–1872
William J. Sewell	1881–1887; 1895–1901	1; 2	New Jersey	Republican	1835–1901
Horatio Seymour	1821–1824; 1824–1833	1	Vermont	Democratic-Republican; National Republican	1778–1857
John Seymour	1991–1992	1	California	Republican	1937–2026
John F. Shafroth	1913–1919	2	Colorado	Democratic	1854–1922
William Sharon	1875–1881	1	Nevada	Republican	1821–1885
James Sheafe	1801–1802	3	New Hampshire	Federalist	1755–1829
William Paine Sheffield Sr.	1884–1885	2	Rhode Island	Republican	1820–1907
Richard Shelby	1987–1994; 1994–2023	3	Alabama	Democratic; Republican	1934–present
Ether Shepley	1833–1836	1	Maine	Democratic	1789–1877
Morris Sheppard	1913–1941	2	Texas	Democratic	1875–1941
John Sherman	1861–1877; 1881–1897	3; 1	Ohio	Republican	1823–1900
Lawrence Y. Sherman	1913–1921	3	Illinois	Republican	1858–1939
Roger Sherman	1791–1793	3	Connecticut	Federalist	1721–1793
James Shields	1849–1855; 1858–1859; 1879	3; 2; 3	Illinois; Minnesota; Missouri	Democratic	1810–1879
John K. Shields	1913–1925	2	Tennessee	Democratic	1858–1934
Henrik Shipstead	1923–1941; 1941–1947	1	Minnesota	Farmer–Labor; Republican	1881–1960
Benjamin F. Shively	1909–1916	3	Indiana	Democratic	1857–1916
Samuel M. Shortridge	1921–1933	3	California	Republican	1861–1952
Hugh Ike Shott	1942–1943	2	West Virginia	Republican	1866–1953
George L. Shoup	1890–1901	2	Idaho	Republican	1836–1904
Nathaniel Silsbee	1826–1835	2	Massachusetts	National Republican	1773–1850
F. M. Simmons	1901–1931	2	North Carolina	Democratic	1854–1940
James F. Simmons	1841–1847; 1857–1862	2; 1	Rhode Island	Whig; Republican	1795–1864
Joseph Simon	1898–1903	3	Oregon	Republican	1851–1935
Paul Simon	1985–1997	2	Illinois	Democratic	1928–2003
Alan Simpson	1979–1997	2	Wyoming	Republican	1931–2025
Milward Simpson	1962–1967	2	Wyoming	Republican	1897–1993
Kyrsten Sinema	2019–2025	1	Arizona	Democratic; Independent	1976–present
James H. Slater	1879–1885	3	Oregon	Democratic	1826–1899
James M. Slattery	1939–1940	2	Illinois	Democratic	1878–1948
John Slidell	1853–1861	3	Louisiana	Democratic	1793–1871
George Smathers	1951–1969	3	Florida	Democratic	1913–2007
William H. Smathers	1937–1943	2	New Jersey	Democratic	1891–1955
Benjamin A. Smith II	1960–1962	1	Massachusetts	Democratic	1916–1991
Bob Smith	1990–2003	2	New Hampshire	Republican	1941–present
Daniel Smith	1798–1799; 1805–1809	1; 2	Tennessee	Democratic-Republican	1748–1818
Delazon Smith	1859	2	Oregon	Democratic	1816–1860
Ellison D. Smith	1909–1944	3	South Carolina	Democratic	1864–1944
Gordon H. Smith	1997–2009	2	Oregon	Republican	1952–present
H. Alexander Smith	1944–1959	1	New Jersey	Republican	1880–1966
Hoke Smith	1911–1921	3	Georgia	Democratic	1855–1931
Israel Smith	1803–1807	1	Vermont	Democratic-Republican	1759–1810
James Smith Jr.	1893–1899	1	New Jersey	Democratic	1851–1927
John Smith	1803–1808	1	Ohio	Democratic-Republican	1735–1824
John Smith	1804–1813	3	New York	Democratic-Republican	1735–1816
John Walter Smith	1908–1921	3	Maryland	Democratic	1845–1925
Marcus A. Smith	1912–1921	3	Arizona	Democratic	1851–1924
Margaret Chase Smith	1949–1973	2	Maine	Republican	1897–1995
Nathan Smith	1833–1835	1	Connecticut	National Republican	1777–1835
Oliver H. Smith	1837–1843	3	Indiana	Whig	1794–1859
Perry Smith	1837–1843	3	Connecticut	Democratic	1783–1852
Ralph T. Smith	1969–1970	3	Illinois	Republican	1915–1972
Samuel Smith	1803–1815; 1822–1824; 1824–1833	1	Maryland	Democratic-Republican; Democratic-Republican; Democratic	1752–1839
Truman Smith	1849–1854	3	Connecticut	Whig	1791–1884
William Smith	1816–1823; 1826–1831	2; 3	South Carolina	Democratic-Republican; Democratic	1762–1840
William Alden Smith	1907–1919	2	Michigan	Republican	1859–1932
Willis Smith	1950–1953	2	North Carolina	Democratic	1887–1953
Reed Smoot	1903–1933	3	Utah	Republican	1862–1941
Olympia Snowe	1995–2013	1	Maine	Republican	1947–present
Pierre Soulé	1847; 1849–1853	2; 3	Louisiana	Democratic	1801–1870
Samuel L. Southard	1821–1823; 1833–1837; 1837–1842	1	New Jersey	Democratic-Republican; National Republican; Whig	1787–1842
John Sparkman	1946–1979	2	Alabama	Democratic	1899–1985
Arlen Specter	1981–2009; 2009–2011	3	Pennsylvania	Republican; Democratic	1930–2012
Jesse Speight	1845–1847	1	Mississippi	Democratic	1795–1847
John S. Spence	1836–1840	3	Maryland	Whig	1788–1840
George E. Spencer	1868–1879	3	Alabama	Republican	1836–1893
Lloyd Spencer	1941–1943	2	Arkansas	Democratic	1893–1981
Selden P. Spencer	1918–1925	3	Missouri	Republican	1862–1925
William Spong Jr.	1966–1973	2	Virginia	Democratic	1920–1997
John Coit Spooner	1885–1891; 1897–1907	3	Wisconsin	Republican	1843–1919
Peleg Sprague	1829–1835	2	Maine	National Republican	1793–1880
William Sprague III	1842–1844	1	Rhode Island	Whig	1799–1856
William Sprague IV	1863–1873; 1873–1875	1	Rhode Island	Republican; Liberal Republican	1830–1915
Presley Spruance	1847–1853	2	Delaware	Whig	1785–1863
Watson C. Squire	1889–1897	3	Washington	Republican	1838–1926
Debbie Stabenow	2001–2025	1	Michigan	Democratic	1950–present
Robert Stafford	1971–1989	1	Vermont	Republican	1913–2006
Robert N. Stanfield	1921–1927	3	Oregon	Republican	1877–1945
William A. Stanfill	1945–1946	2	Kentucky	Republican	1892–1971
Leland Stanford	1885–1893	3	California	Republican	1824–1893
Augustus Owsley Stanley	1919–1925	2	Kentucky	Democratic	1867–1958
Joseph Stanton Jr.	1790–1793	2	Rhode Island	Democratic-Republican	1739–1807
Benjamin Stark	1861–1862	2	Oregon	Democratic	1820–1898
Ozora P. Stearns	1871	2	Minnesota	Republican	1831–1896
Daniel F. Steck	1926–1931	2	Iowa	Democratic	1881–1950
Frederick Steiwer	1927–1938	3	Oregon	Republican	1883–1939
John C. Stennis	1947–1989	1	Mississippi	Democratic	1901–1995
Hubert D. Stephens	1923–1935	1	Mississippi	Democratic	1875–1946
Isaac Stephenson	1907–1915	3	Wisconsin	Republican	1829–1918
Thomas Sterling	1913–1925	2	South Dakota	Republican	1851–1930
Ted Stevens	1968–2009	2	Alaska	Republican	1923–2010
Adlai Stevenson III	1970–1981	3	Illinois	Democratic	1930–2021
John W. Stevenson	1871–1877	2	Kentucky	Democratic	1812–1886
David Stewart	1849–1850	1	Maryland	Whig	1800–1858
David W. Stewart	1926–1927	3	Iowa	Republican	1887–1974
Donald Stewart	1978–1981	3	Alabama	Democratic	1940–present
John Wolcott Stewart	1908	1	Vermont	Republican	1825–1915
Tom Stewart	1938–1949	2	Tennessee	Democratic	1892–1972
William M. Stewart	1864–1875; 1887–1893; 1893–1901; 1901–1905	1	Nevada	Republican; Republican; Silver Republican; Republican	1827–1909
Francis B. Stockbridge	1887–1894	1	Michigan	Republican	1826–1894
John P. Stockton	1865–1866; 1869–1875	2; 1	New Jersey	Democratic	1826–1900
Richard Stockton	1796–1799	2	New Jersey	Federalist	1764–1828
Robert F. Stockton	1851–1853	1	New Jersey	Democratic	1795–1866
Montfort Stokes	1816–1823	2	North Carolina	Democratic-Republican	1762–1842
David Stone	1801–1807; 1813–1814	3	North Carolina	Democratic-Republican	1770–1818
Richard Stone	1975–1980	3	Florida	Democratic	1928–2019
William J. Stone	1903–1918	3	Missouri	Democratic	1848–1918
Clement Storer	1817–1819	3	New Hampshire	Democratic-Republican	1760–1830
Thomas M. Storke	1938–1939	3	California	Democratic	1876–1971
Luther Strange	2017–2018	2	Alabama	Republican	1953–present
Robert Strange	1836–1840	3	North Carolina	Democratic	1796–1854
Caleb Strong	1789–1796	2	Massachusetts	Federalist	1745–1819
Charles E. Stuart	1853–1859	2	Michigan	Democratic	1810–1887
Daniel Sturgeon	1840–1851	1	Pennsylvania	Democratic	1789–1878
Patrick Joseph Sullivan	1929–1930	2	Wyoming	Republican	1865–1935
William V. Sullivan	1898–1901	2	Mississippi	Democratic	1857–1918
Charles Sumner	1851–1857; 1857–1872; 1872–1874	1	Massachusetts	Free Soil; Republican; Liberal Republican	1811–1874
Thomas Sumter	1801–1810	2	South Carolina	Democratic-Republican	1734–1832
John E. Sununu	2003–2009	2	New Hampshire	Republican	1964–present
George Sutherland	1905–1917	1	Utah	Republican	1862–1942
Howard Sutherland	1917–1923	1	West Virginia	Republican	1865–1950
Claude A. Swanson	1910–1933	1	Virginia	Democratic	1862–1939
Benjamin Swift	1833–1836; 1836–1839	1	Vermont	National Republican; Whig	1781–1847
George R. Swift	1946	2	Alabama	Democratic	1887–1972
Stuart Symington	1953–1976	1	Missouri	Democratic	1901–1988
Steve Symms	1981–1993	3	Idaho	Republican	1938–2024
Horace Tabor	1883	2	Colorado	Republican	1830–1899
Kingsley A. Taft	1946–1947	1	Ohio	Republican	1903–1970
Robert A. Taft	1939–1953	3	Ohio	Republican	1889–1953
Robert Taft Jr.	1971–1976	1	Ohio	Republican	1917–1993
Thomas Taggart	1916	3	Indiana	Democratic	1856–1929
Charles Tait	1809–1819	3	Georgia	Democratic-Republican	1768–1835
Isham Talbot	1815–1819; 1820–1824; 1824–1825	3	Kentucky	Democratic-Republican; Democratic-Republican; National Republican	1773–1837
Jim Talent	2002–2007	1	Missouri	Republican	1956–present
James Taliaferro	1899–1911	1	Florida	Democratic	1847–1934
Nathaniel P. Tallmadge	1833–1839; 1839–1844	1	New York	Democratic; Whig	1795–1864
Herman Talmadge	1957–1981	3	Georgia	Democratic	1913–2002
Benjamin Tappan	1839–1845	1	Ohio	Democratic	1773–1857
Josiah Tattnall	1796–1799	2	Georgia	Democratic-Republican	1762–1803
Glen H. Taylor	1945–1951	3	Idaho	Democratic	1904–1984
John Taylor of Caroline	1792–1794; 1803; 1822–1824	2; 1; 2	Virginia	Democratic-Republican	1753–1824
John Taylor	1810–1816	2	South Carolina	Democratic-Republican	1770–1832
Robert Love Taylor	1907–1912	2	Tennessee	Democratic	1850–1912
Waller Taylor	1816–1824; 1824–1825	3	Indiana	Democratic-Republican; National Republican	1786–1826
Henry Tazewell	1794–1799	2	Virginia	Democratic-Republican	1753–1799
Littleton Waller Tazewell	1824–1832	2	Virginia	Democratic	1774–1860
Henry M. Teller	1876–1882; 1885–1897; 1897–1901; 1901–1909	2; 3; 3; 3	Colorado	Republican; Republican; Silver Republican; Democratic	1830–1914
John C. Ten Eyck	1859–1865	2	New Jersey	Republican	1814–1879
Joseph M. Terrell	1910–1911	3	Georgia	Democratic	1861–1912
Jon Tester	2007–2025	1	Montana	Democratic	1956–present
John Milton Thayer	1867–1871	2	Nebraska	Republican	1820–1906
Charles S. Thomas	1913–1921	3	Colorado	Democratic	1849–1934
Craig L. Thomas	1995–2007	1	Wyoming	Republican	1933–2007
Elbert D. Thomas	1933–1951	3	Utah	Democratic	1883–1953
Elmer Thomas	1927–1951	3	Oklahoma	Democratic	1876–1965
Jesse B. Thomas	1818–1824; 1824–1829	2	Illinois	Democratic-Republican; National Republican	1777–1853
John Thomas	1928–1933; 1940–1945	3; 2	Idaho	Republican	1874–1945
Fountain L. Thompson	1909–1910	3	North Dakota	Democratic	1854–1942
Fred Thompson	1994–2003	2	Tennessee	Republican	1942–2015
John Burton Thompson	1853–1857; 1857–1859	2	Kentucky	Whig; American	1810–1874
Thomas W. Thompson	1814–1817	2	New Hampshire	Federalist	1766–1821
William H. Thompson	1913–1919	2	Kansas	Democratic	1871–1928
William H. Thompson	1933–1934	1	Nebraska	Democratic	1853–1937
John Renshaw Thomson	1853–1862	1	New Jersey	Democratic	1800–1862
John Thornton	1910–1915	3	Louisiana	Democratic	1846–1917
Buckner Thruston	1805–1809	2	Kentucky	Democratic-Republican	1763–1845
Allen G. Thurman	1869–1881	1	Ohio	Democratic	1813–1895
Strom Thurmond	1954–1956; 1956–1964; 1964–2003	2	South Carolina	Democratic; Democratic; Republican	1902–2003
John M. Thurston	1895–1901	2	Nebraska	Republican	1847–1916
Edward J. Thye	1947–1959	1	Minnesota	Republican	1896–1969
Isaac Tichenor	1796–1797; 1815–1821	1	Vermont	Federalist	1754–1848
Edward Tiffin	1807–1809	3	Ohio	Democratic-Republican	1766–1829
Benjamin Tillman	1895–1918	2	South Carolina	Democratic	1847–1918
John Tipton	1832–1839	1	Indiana	Democratic	1786–1839
Thomas Tipton	1867–1873; 1873–1875	1	Nebraska	Republican; Liberal Republican	1817–1899
Charles W. Tobey	1939–1953	3	New Hampshire	Republican	1880–1953
Gideon Tomlinson	1831–1837	3	Connecticut	National Republican	1780–1854
Robert Toombs	1853–1855; 1855–1861	2	Georgia	Whig; Democratic	1810–1885
Pat Toomey	2011–2023	3	Pennsylvania	Republican	1961–present
Robert Torricelli	1997–2003	2	New Jersey	Democratic	1951–present
Isaac Toucey	1852–1857	1	Connecticut	Democratic	1792–1869
John Tower	1961–1985	2	Texas	Republican	1925–1991
Charles A. Towne	1900–1901	1	Minnesota	Democratic	1858–1928
Charles E. Townsend	1911–1923	1	Michigan	Republican	1856–1924
John G. Townsend Jr.	1929–1941	1	Delaware	Republican	1871–1964
Uriah Tracy	1796–1807	3	Connecticut	Federalist	1755–1807
Park Trammell	1917–1936	1	Florida	Democratic	1876–1936
Paul Trible	1983–1989	1	Virginia	Republican	1946–present
William A. Trimble	1819–1821	3	Ohio	Democratic-Republican	1786–1821
James F. Trotter	1838	1	Mississippi	Democratic	1802–1866
George Troup	1816–1818; 1829–1833	2	Georgia	Democratic-Republican; Democratic	1780–1856
Harry S. Truman	1935–1945	1	Missouri	Democratic	1884–1972
Jonathan Trumbull Jr.	1795–1796	3	Connecticut	Federalist	1740–1809
Lyman Trumbull	1855–1857; 1857–1872; 1872–1873	3	Illinois	Democratic; Republican; Liberal Republican	1813–1896
Paul Tsongas	1979–1985	2	Massachusetts	Democratic	1941–1997
James M. Tunnell	1941–1947	1	Delaware	Democratic	1879–1957
John V. Tunney	1971–1977	1	California	Democratic	1934–2018
Thomas B. Turley	1897–1901	2	Tennessee	Democratic	1845–1910
George Turner	1897–1901; 1901–1903	3	Washington	Silver Republican; Democratic	1850–1932
James Turner	1805–1816	2	North Carolina	Democratic-Republican	1766–1824
Hopkins L. Turney	1845–1851	1	Tennessee	Democratic	1797–1857
David Turpie	1863; 1887–1899	1	Indiana	Democratic	1828–1909
Joseph Tydings	1965–1971	1	Maryland	Democratic	1928–2018
Millard Tydings	1927–1951	3	Maryland	Democratic	1890–1961
John Tyler	1827–1833; 1833–1836	1	Virginia	Democratic; National Republican	1790–1862
Lawrence Tyson	1925–1929	2	Tennessee	Democratic	1861–1929
Mark Udall	2009–2015	2	Colorado	Democratic	1950–present
Tom Udall	2009–2021	2	New Mexico	Democratic	1948–present
William B. Umstead	1946–1948	2	North Carolina	Democratic	1895–1954
Joseph R. Underwood	1847–1853	2	Kentucky	Whig	1791–1876
Oscar Underwood	1915–1927	3	Alabama	Democratic	1862–1929
Thomas R. Underwood	1951–1952	2	Kentucky	Democratic	1898–1956
William Upham	1843–1853	3	Vermont	Whig	1792–1853
Robert W. Upton	1953–1954	3	New Hampshire	Republican	1884–1972
Martin Van Buren	1821–1824; 1824–1828	1	New York	Democratic-Republican; Democratic	1782–1862
Nicholas Van Dyke	1817–1824; 1824–1826	2	Delaware	Federalist; National Republican	1770–1826
Frederick Van Nuys	1933–1944	3	Indiana	Democratic	1874–1944
Peter G. Van Winkle	1863–1867; 1867–1869	1	West Virginia	Union; Republican	1808–1872
Charles Van Wyck	1881–1887	1	Nebraska	Republican	1824–1895
JD Vance	2023–2025	3	Ohio	Republican	1984–present
Zebulon Vance	1879–1894	3	North Carolina	Democratic	1830–1894
Arthur Vandenberg	1928–1951	1	Michigan	Republican	1884–1951
James K. Vardaman	1913–1919	2	Mississippi	Democratic	1861–1930
Joseph Bradley Varnum	1811–1817	2	Massachusetts	Democratic-Republican	1751–1821
Abraham B. Venable	1803–1804	1	Virginia	Democratic-Republican	1758–1811
George Graham Vest	1879–1903	3	Missouri	Democratic	1830–1904
George Vickers	1868–1873	3	Maryland	Democratic	1801–1879
William F. Vilas	1891–1897	3	Wisconsin	Democratic	1840–1908
John Vining	1793–1798	2	Delaware	Federalist	1758–1802
David Vitter	2005–2017	3	Louisiana	Republican	1961–present
George Voinovich	1999–2011	3	Ohio	Republican	1936–2016
Daniel W. Voorhees	1877–1897	3	Indiana	Democratic	1827–1897
Benjamin Wade	1851–1856; 1856–1869	1	Ohio	Whig; Republican	1800–1878
Bainbridge Wadleigh	1873–1879	3	New Hampshire	Republican	1831–1891
James W. Wadsworth Jr.	1915–1927	3	New York	Republican	1877–1952
George A. Waggaman	1831–1835	2	Louisiana	National Republican	1782–1843
Robert F. Wagner	1927–1949	3	New York	Democratic	1877–1953
Frederic C. Walcott	1929–1935	1	Connecticut	Republican	1869–1949
John Wales	1849–1851	1	Delaware	Whig	1783–1863
Freeman Walker	1819–1821	2	Georgia	Democratic-Republican	1780–1827
George Walker	1814	2	Kentucky	Democratic-Republican	1763–1819
Isaac P. Walker	1848–1855	3	Wisconsin	Democratic	1815–1872
James D. Walker	1879–1885	3	Arkansas	Democratic	1830–1906
John Walker	1790	1	Virginia	Federalist	1744–1809
John Williams Walker	1819–1822	3	Alabama	Democratic-Republican	1783–1823
Robert J. Walker	1835–1845	2	Mississippi	Democratic	1801–1869
Walter Walker	1932	3	Colorado	Democratic	1883–1956
Garret D. Wall	1835–1841	2	New Jersey	Democratic	1783–1850
James Walter Wall	1863	1	New Jersey	Democratic	1820–1872
William A. Wallace	1875–1881	1	Pennsylvania	Democratic	1827–1896
Monrad Wallgren	1940–1945	1	Washington	Democratic	1891–1961
Malcolm Wallop	1977–1995	1	Wyoming	Republican	1933–2011
Arthur Walsh	1943–1944	1	New Jersey	Democratic	1896–1947
David I. Walsh	1919–1925; 1926–1947	2; 1	Massachusetts	Democratic	1872–1947
John Walsh	2014–2015	2	Montana	Democratic	1960–present
Patrick Walsh	1894–1895	2	Georgia	Democratic	1840–1899
Thomas J. Walsh	1913–1933	2	Montana	Democratic	1859–1933
Herbert S. Walters	1963–1964	2	Tennessee	Democratic	1891–1973
Edward C. Walthall	1885–1894; 1895–1898	2	Mississippi	Democratic	1831–1898
George Walton	1795–1796	2	Georgia	Federalist	1749–1804
Matthias Ward	1858–1859	1	Texas	Democratic	1805–1861
Nicholas Ware	1821–1824	2	Georgia	Democratic-Republican	1769–1824
John Warner	1979–2009	2	Virginia	Republican	1927–2021
Willard Warner	1868–1871	2	Alabama	Republican	1826–1906
William Warner	1905–1911	1	Missouri	Republican	1840–1916
Francis E. Warren	1890–1893; 1895–1929	1; 2	Wyoming	Republican	1844–1929
William B. Washburn	1874–1875	1	Massachusetts	Republican	1820–1887
William D. Washburn	1889–1895	2	Minnesota	Republican	1831–1912
Charles W. Waterman	1927–1932	3	Colorado	Republican	1861–1932
Arthur V. Watkins	1947–1959	1	Utah	Republican	1886–1973
Clarence W. Watson	1911–1913	2	West Virginia	Democratic	1864–1940
James Watson	1798–1800	1	New York	Federalist	1750–1806
James E. Watson	1916–1933	3	Indiana	Republican	1864–1948
Thomas E. Watson	1921–1922	3	Georgia	Democratic	1856–1922
Jim Webb	2007–2013	1	Virginia	Democratic	1946–present
William R. Webb	1913	2	Tennessee	Democratic	1842–1926
Daniel Webster	1827–1833; 1833–1841; 1845–1850	1	Massachusetts	National Republican; Whig; Whig	1782–1852
John W. Weeks	1913–1919	2	Massachusetts	Republican	1860–1926
Sinclair Weeks	1944	2	Massachusetts	Republican	1893–1972
Lowell Weicker	1971–1989	1	Connecticut	Republican	1931–2023
Adonijah Welch	1868–1869	1	Florida	Republican	1821–1889
Herman Welker	1951–1957	3	Idaho	Republican	1906–1957
John B. Weller	1852–1857	1	California	Democratic	1812–1875
Ovington Weller	1921–1927	3	Maryland	Republican	1862–1947
George L. Wellington	1897–1903	3	Maryland	Democratic	1852–1927
John S. Wells	1855	3	New Hampshire	Democratic	1803–1860
William H. Wells	1799–1804; 1813–1817	2	Delaware	Federalist	1769–1829
Paul Wellstone	1991–2002	2	Minnesota	Democratic	1944–2002
J. R. West	1871–1872; 1872; 1872–1877	2	Louisiana	Republican; Liberal Republican; Republican	1822–1898
William Stanley West	1914	2	Georgia	Democratic	1849–1914
James Westcott	1845–1849	3	Florida	Democratic	1802–1880
George P. Wetmore	1895–1907; 1908–1913	2	Rhode Island	Republican	1846–1921
Jesse Wharton	1814–1815	2	Tennessee	Democratic-Republican	1782–1833
Burton K. Wheeler	1923–1947	1	Montana	Democratic	1882–1975
Kenneth S. Wherry	1943–1951	2	Nebraska	Republican	1892–1951
James Whitcomb	1849–1852	3	Indiana	Democratic	1795–1852
Albert Smith White	1839–1845	1	Indiana	Whig	1803–1864
Edward Douglass White	1891–1894	3	Louisiana	Democratic	1845–1921
Frank White	1914–1915	3	Alabama	Democratic	1847–1922
Hugh Lawson White	1825–1835; 1835–1836; 1836–1840	2	Tennessee	Democratic; National Republican; Whig	1773–1840
Samuel White	1801–1809	1	Delaware	Federalist	1770–1809
Stephen M. White	1893–1899	1	California	Democratic	1853–1901
Wallace H. White	1931–1949	2	Maine	Republican	1877–1952
Jenkin Whiteside	1809–1811	2	Tennessee	Democratic-Republican	1772–1822
Washington C. Whitthorne	1886–1887	1	Tennessee	Democratic	1825–1891
William Pinkney Whyte	1868–1869; 1875–1881; 1906–1908	1; 1; 3	Maryland	Democratic	1824–1908
Louis Wigfall	1859–1861	1	Texas	Democratic	1816–1874
Leonard Wilcox	1842–1843	3	New Hampshire	Democratic	1799–1850
Alexander Wiley	1939–1963	3	Wisconsin	Republican	1884–1967
Xenophon P. Wilfley	1918	3	Missouri	Democratic	1871–1931
William Wilkins	1831–1834	3	Pennsylvania	Democratic	1779–1865
Morton S. Wilkinson	1859–1865	2	Minnesota	Republican	1819–1894
Calvin Willey	1825–1831	3	Connecticut	National Republican	1776–1858
Waitman T. Willey	1861–1863; 1863–1871	1; 2	Virginia; West Virginia	Union; Republican	1811–1900
Abram Williams	1886–1887	1	California	Republican	1832–1911
George H. Williams	1925–1926	3	Missouri	Republican	1871–1963
George Henry Williams	1865–1871	2	Oregon	Republican	1823–1910
Harrison A. Williams	1959–1982	1	New Jersey	Democratic	1919–2001
Jared W. Williams	1853–1854	2	New Hampshire	Democratic	1796–1864
John Williams	1815–1823	2	Tennessee	Democratic-Republican	1778–1837
John J. Williams	1947–1970	1	Delaware	Republican	1904–1988
John Sharp Williams	1911–1923	1	Mississippi	Democratic	1854–1932
John Stuart Williams	1879–1885	3	Kentucky	Democratic	1818–1898
Reuel Williams	1837–1843	1	Maine	Democratic	1783–1862
Thomas Hickman Williams	1838–1839	1	Mississippi	Democratic	1801–1851
Thomas Hill Williams	1817–1824; 1824–1829	2	Mississippi	Democratic-Republican; Democratic	1780–1840
Ben M. Williamson	1930–1931	2	Kentucky	Democratic	1864–1941
Frank B. Willis	1921–1928	3	Ohio	Republican	1871–1928
Raymond E. Willis	1941–1947	1	Indiana	Republican	1875–1956
David Wilmot	1861–1863	1	Pennsylvania	Republican	1814–1868
Ephraim K. Wilson II	1885–1891	3	Maryland	Democratic	1821–1891
George A. Wilson	1943–1949	2	Iowa	Republican	1884–1953
Henry Wilson	1855; 1855–1856; 1856–1873	2	Massachusetts	Free Soil; American; Republican	1812–1875
James F. Wilson	1883–1895	2	Iowa	Republican	1828–1895
James J. Wilson	1815–1821	1	New Jersey	Democratic-Republican	1775–1824
John L. Wilson	1895–1899	1	Washington	Republican	1850–1912
Pete Wilson	1983–1991	1	California	Republican	1933–present
Robert Wilson	1862–1863	3	Missouri	Union	1803–1870
William Windom	1870–1871; 1871–1881; 1881–1883	2	Minnesota	Republican	1827–1891
Paine Wingate	1789–1793	2	New Hampshire	Democratic-Republican	1739–1838
Robert C. Winthrop	1850–1851	1	Massachusetts	Whig	1809–1894
Tim Wirth	1987–1993	3	Colorado	Democratic	1939–present
Garrett Withers	1949–1950	3	Kentucky	Democratic	1884–1953
Robert E. Withers	1875–1881	1	Virginia	Democratic	1821–1907
Harris Wofford	1991–1995	1	Pennsylvania	Democratic	1926–2019
Thomas A. Wofford	1956	2	South Carolina	Democratic	1908–1978
Edward O. Wolcott	1889–1901	2	Colorado	Republican	1848–1905
Josiah O. Wolcott	1917–1921	1	Delaware	Democratic	1877–1938
William Woodbridge	1841–1847	2	Michigan	Whig	1780–1861
Levi Woodbury	1825–1831; 1841–1845	3; 2	New Hampshire	Democratic	1789–1851
John D. Works	1911–1917	1	California	Republican	1847–1928
Thomas Worthington	1803–1807; 1810–1814	3; 1	Ohio	Democratic-Republican	1773–1827
George G. Wright	1871–1877	2	Iowa	Republican	1820–1896
Joseph A. Wright	1862–1863	1	Indiana	Democratic	1810–1867
Robert Wright	1801–1806	3	Maryland	Democratic-Republican	1752–1826
Silas Wright	1833–1844	3	New York	Democratic	1795–1847
William Wright	1853–1859; 1863–1866	2; 1	New Jersey	Democratic	1794–1866
Louis C. Wyman	1974–1975	3	New Hampshire	Republican	1917–2002
Ralph Yarborough	1957–1971	1	Texas	Democratic	1903–1996
Richard Yates Sr.	1865–1871	2	Illinois	Republican	1815–1873
Lafayette Young	1910–1911	2	Iowa	Republican	1848–1926
Milton Young	1945–1981	3	North Dakota	Republican	1897–1983
Richard M. Young	1837–1843	3	Illinois	Democratic	1798–1861
Stephen M. Young	1959–1971	1	Ohio	Democratic	1889–1984
David Levy Yulee	1845–1851; 1855–1861	1; 3	Florida	Democratic	1810–1886
Edward Zorinsky	1976–1987	1	Nebraska	Democratic	1928–1987

== See also ==
- Classes of United States senators
- List of current United States senators
- Seniority in the United States Senate
- Unseated members of the United States Congress
