= 2nd United States Congress =

Legislative term from 1791–1793

←	1st	3rd	→
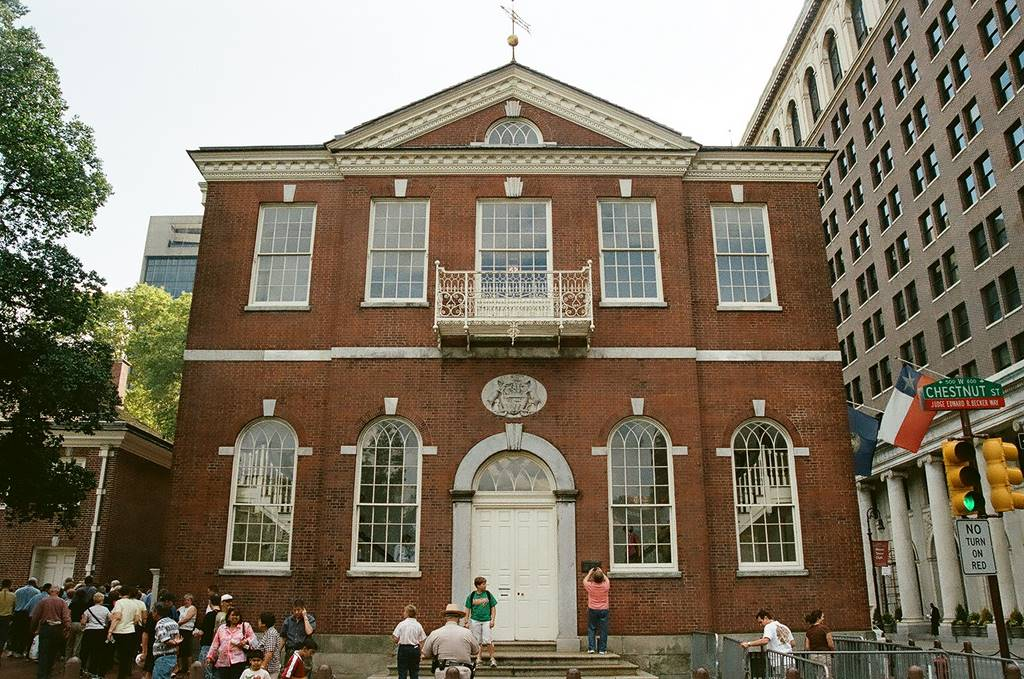
- Congress Hall (2007)

Overview
- Legislative body: United States Congress
- Jurisdiction: United States
- Term: March 4, 1791 – March 3, 1793

Senate
- Members: 26–30
- President: John Adams (P)
- President pro tempore: Richard Henry Lee (P); John Langdon (P)
- Party control: Pro-Administration

House of Representatives
- Members: 65-69
- Speaker: Jonathan Trumbull Jr. (P)
- Party control: Pro-Administration

Sessions
- Special (Note: Special session of the Senate.): March 4, 1791 – March 4, 1791
- 1st: October 24, 1791 – May 8, 1792
- 2nd: November 5, 1792 – March 2, 1793

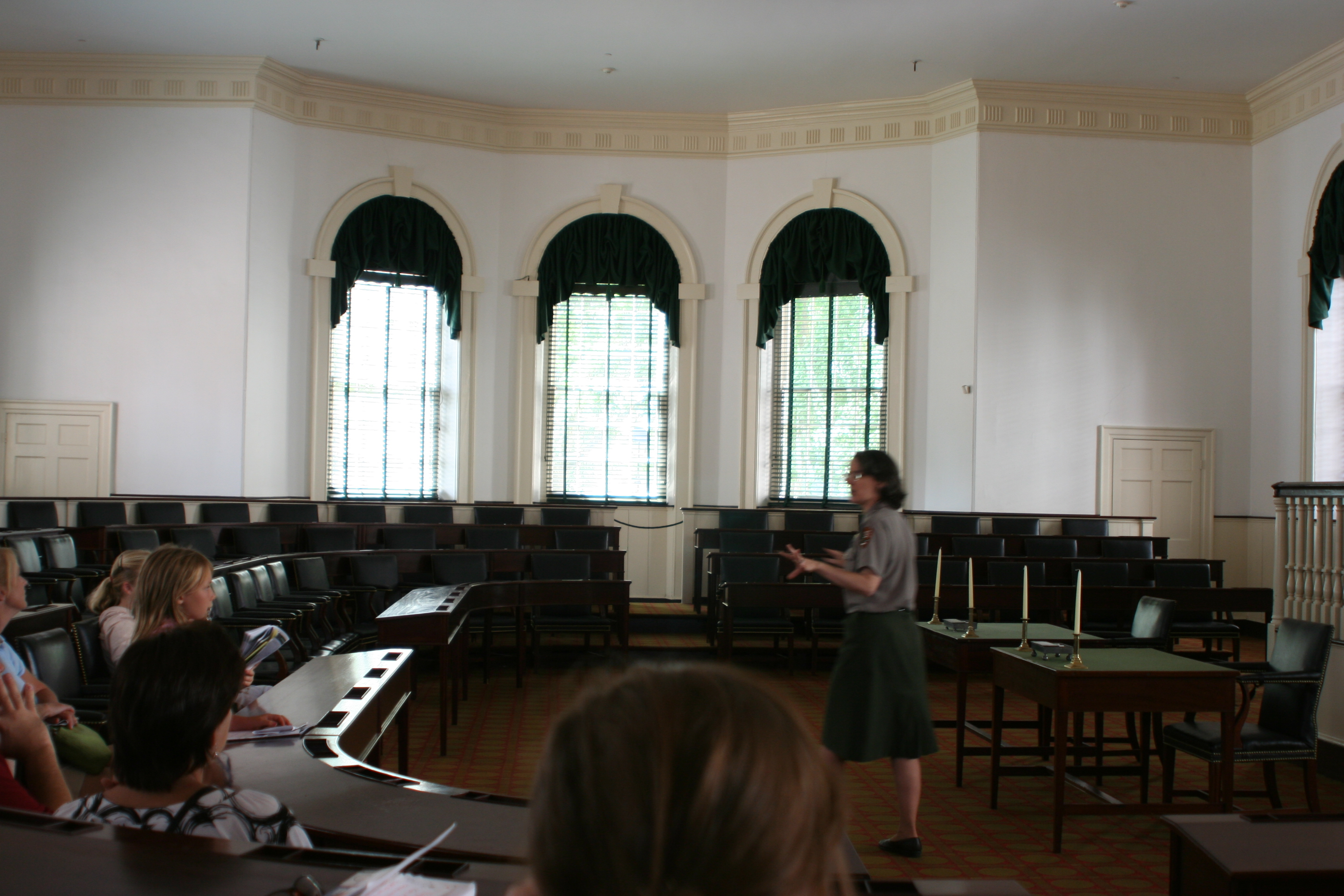
Modern tour group visiting the House of Representatives chamber at Congress Hall

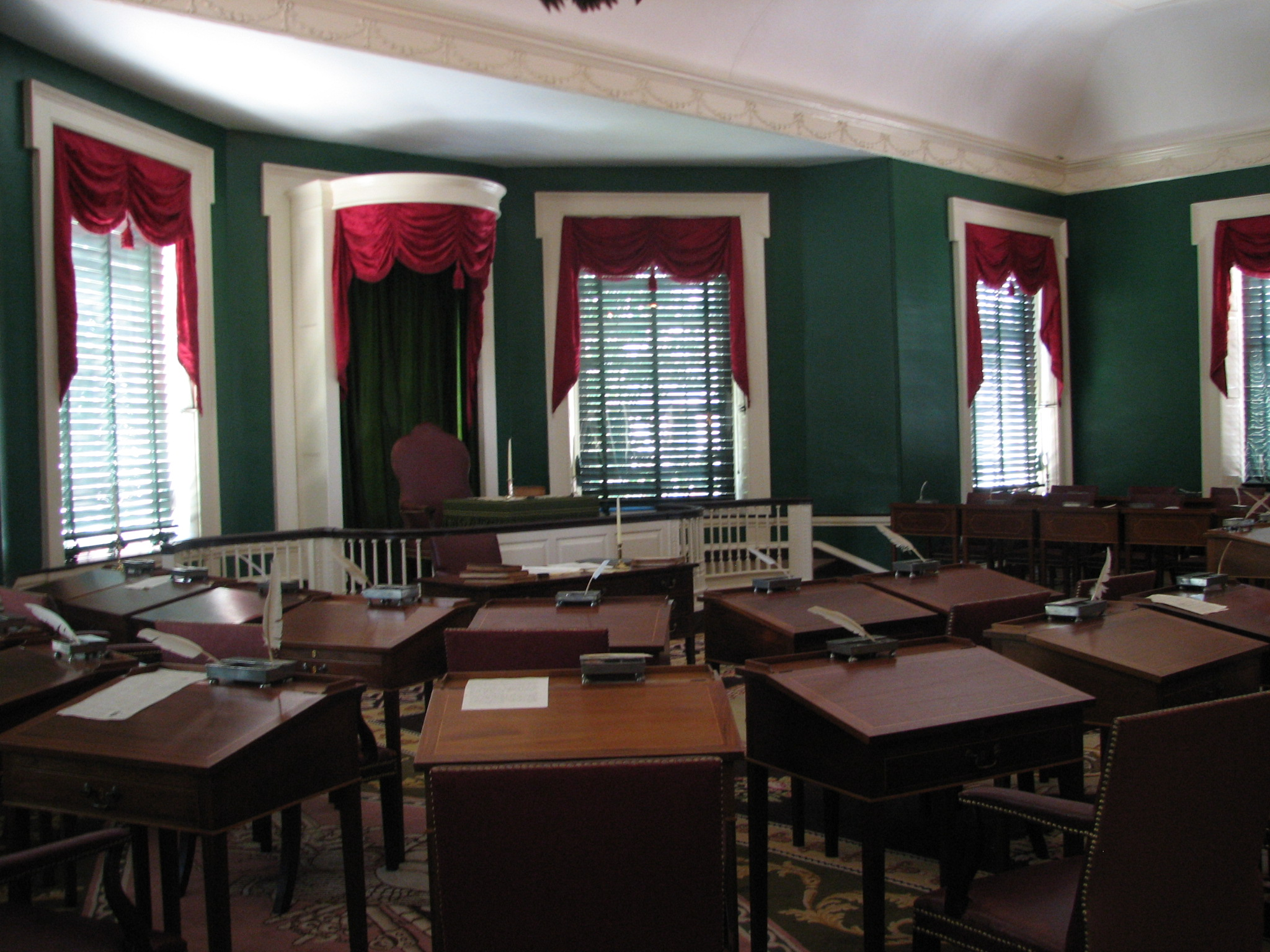
Senate chamber at Congress Hall

The 2nd United States Congress, consisting of the United States Senate and the United States House of Representatives, met at Congress Hall in Philadelphia, Pennsylvania, from March 4, 1791, to March 4, 1793, during the third and fourth years of George Washington's presidency. The apportionment of seats in the House of Representatives was based on the provisions of Article I, Section 2, Clause 3 of the United States Constitution. Additional House seats were assigned to the two new states of Vermont and Kentucky. Both chambers had a Pro-Administration majority.

== Major events ==
- April 5, 1792: President Washington used the veto for the first time, vetoing a bill designed to apportion representatives among U.S. states.
- April–May, 1792: the House conducted the government's first investigative hearings, examining Gen. Arthur St. Clair's Defeat in the Battle of the Wabash.
- October 13, 1792: Foundation of Washington, D.C.: The cornerstone of the United States Executive Mansion, now known as the White House, was laid.

== Major legislation ==
- February 20, 1792: Postal Service Act, Sess. 1, ch. 7, 1 Stat. 232, established the U.S. Post Office
- March 1, 1792: Act relative to the Election of a President and Vice President of the United States, and to Presidential Succession, Sess. 1, ch. 8, 1 Stat. 239, stated the process for electors and Congress to follow when electing a president and vice president, and established which federal officer would act as president if both the offices of president and vice president became vacant.
- April 2, 1792: Coinage Act of 1792, Sess. 1, ch. 16, 1 Stat. 246, established the United States Mint and regulated coinage
- April 14, 1792: Apportionment Act of 1792, Sess. 1, ch. 23 1 Stat. 253, increased the size of the House of Representatives from 69 seats in the 2nd Congress to 105 in the 3rd and apportioned those seats among the several states according to the 1790 census
- May 2, 1792: First Militia Act of 1792, Sess. 1, ch. 28, 1 Stat. 264, empowered the president to call out the militias of the various states in the event of an invasion or rebellion.
- May 5, 1792: Debtors' Prison Relief Act of 1792, Sess. 1, ch. 29, 1 Stat. 265, established penal regulations and restrictions for persons' gaoled for property debt, tax evasion, and tax resistance.
- May 8, 1792: Second Militia Act of 1792, Sess. 1, ch. 33, 1 Stat. 271, required that every free able-bodied white male citizen of the various states, between the ages of 18 and 45, enroll in the militia of the state in which they reside.
- February 12, 1793: Fugitive Slave Act of 1793, Sess. 2, ch. 7, 1 Stat. 302
- March 2, 1793: Judiciary Act of 1793 (including Anti-Injunction Act), Sess. 2, ch. 22, 1 Stat. 333

== States admitted ==
- March 4, 1791: Vermont was admitted as the 14th state, 1 Stat. 191
- June 1, 1792: Kentucky was admitted as the 15th state, 1 Stat. 189

== Constitutional amendments ==
- December 15, 1791: The first 10 amendments to the United States Constitution, collectively known as the Bill of Rights, were ratified by the requisite number of states (then 11) to become part of the Constitution.

== Party summary ==
There were no political parties in this Congress. Members are informally grouped into factions of similar interest, based on an analysis of their voting record.

Details on changes are shown below in the "Changes in membership" section.

=== Senate ===
During this congress, two new Senate seats were added for each of the new states of Vermont and Kentucky.

Senate membership

Beginning of the Congress

End of the Congress

	Faction (Shading indicates faction control)		Total	
	Anti-Administration (A)	Pro-Administration (P)	Total	Vacant
End of previous Congress	8	18	26	0
Begin	8	17	25	1
March 4, 1791 (Note: In Connecticut: William Samuel Johnson resigned.)	8	16	24	2
June 13, 1791 (Note: In Connecticut: Roger Sherman was elected to fill the vacancy created when William Samuel Johnson resigned.)	8	17	25	1
November 4, 1791 (Note: In Vermont: the state was admitted to the Union on March 4, 1791, and elected two Senators.)	10	17	27	1
June 18, 1792 (Note: In Kentucky: the state was admitted to the Union on June 1, 1792, and elected two Senators.)	12	17	29	1
October 8, 1792 (Note: In Virginia: Richard Henry Lee resigned.)	11	17	28	2
October 18, 1792 (Note: In Virginia: John Taylor was elected to fill the vacancy created when Richard Henry Lee resigned.)	12	17	29	1
November 30, 1792 (Note: In Maryland: Charles Carroll resigned.)	12	16	28	2
January 10, 1793 (Note: In Maryland: Richard Potts was elected to fill the vacancy created when Charles Carroll resigned.)	12	17	29	1
February 28, 1793 (Note: In Pennsylvania: the legislature, having failed to elect a Senator at the start of the Congress, did so now. Albert Gallatin was not actually seated until the next Congress.)	13	17	30	0
Final voting share	43.3%	56.7%		
Beginning of the next Congress	14	16	30	0

=== House of Representatives ===
Members of the House of Representatives as shared by each state

During this congress, two new House seats were added for each of the new states of Vermont and Kentucky. (Sess. 3, ch. 9, 1 Stat. 191)

House membership

Beginning of the Congress

End of the Congress

	Faction (Shading indicates faction control)		Total	
	Anti-Administration (A)	Pro-Administration (P)	Total	Vacant
End of previous Congress	28	36	64	1
Begin March 4, 1791	25	37	62	3
April 4, 1791 (Note: In Massachusetts's 8th district, George Thatcher was seated late after three runoff elections.)	25	38	63	2
October 24, 1791 (Note: In New York's 1st district, Representative-elect James Townsend died before the Congress began, and Thomas Tredwell was elected to fill the seat. In Vermont, two seats were added as the state joined the union.)	28	38	66	1
November 1791 (Note: In Maryland's 3rd district, William Pinkney resigned.)	28	37	65	2
February 6, 1792 (Note: In Maryland's 3rd district, John Francis Mercer was elected to fill the vacancy created when William Pinkney resigned.)	29	37	66	1
March 21, 1792 (Note: In Georgia's 1st district, Anthony Wayne had been elected in a contested election, and his seat was now declared vacant.)	28	37	65	2
April 2, 1792 (Note: In Massachusetts's 6th district, George Leonard was seated late after seven runoff elections.)	28	38	66	1
June 1, 1792 (Note: When Kentucky entered the union, it received two seats. In Virginia's 2nd district, John Brown resigned to become a Senator from Kentucky. the seat was not filled until the next Congress)	27	38	65	4
November 8, 1792 (Note: In Kentucky's 2nd district, Alexander D. Orr was elected to the new seat.)	28	38	66	3
November 9, 1792 (Note: In Kentucky's 1st district, Christopher Greenup was elected to the new seat.)	29	38	67	2
November 22, 1792 (Note: In Georgia's 1st district, John Milledge was elected to the seat declared vacant because the previous election was contested.)	30	38	68	1
December 6, 1792 (Note: In Maryland's 2nd district, Joshua Seney resigned to become a judge.)	29	38	67	2
January 30, 1793 (Note: In Maryland's 2nd district, William Hindman was elected to fill the vacancy created when Joshua Seney resigned.)	29	39	68	1
Final voting share	42.6%	57.4%		
Beginning of the next Congress	55	50	105	0

== Leadership ==
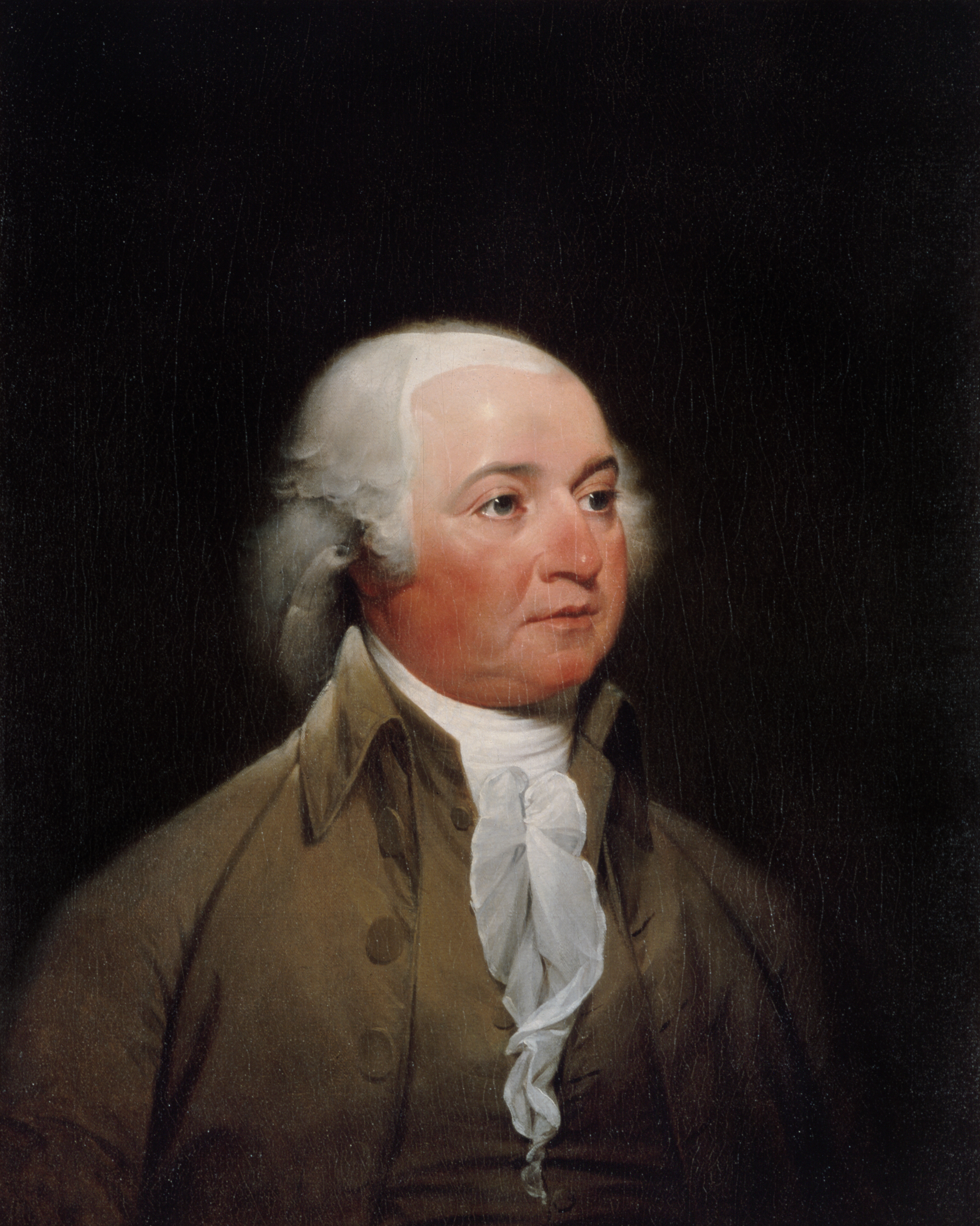
Senate President John Adams

=== Senate ===
- President: John Adams (P)
- President pro tempore:
  - Richard Henry Lee (P)
  - John Langdon (P), elected November 5, 1792

=== House of Representatives ===
- Speaker: Jonathan Trumbull Jr. (P)

== Members ==
This list is arranged by chamber, then by state. Senators are listed by class, and representatives are listed by district.

=== Senate ===
Senators were elected by the state legislatures every two years, with one-third beginning new six-year terms with each Congress. Preceding the names in the list below are Senate class numbers, which indicate the cycle of their election. In this Congress, Class 1 meant their term began in this Congress, facing re-election in 1796; Class 2 meant their term ended with this Congress, facing re-election in 1792; and Class 3 meant their term began in the last Congress, facing re-election in 1794.

==== Connecticut ====
▌1. Oliver Ellsworth (P)
▌3. William S. Johnson (P), until March 4, 1791

▌Roger Sherman (P), from June 13, 1791

==== Delaware ====
▌1. George Read (P)
▌2. Richard Bassett (P)

==== Georgia ====
▌2. William Few (A)
▌3. James Gunn (A)

==== Kentucky ====
▌2. John Brown (A), from June 18, 1792
▌3. John Edwards (A), from June 18, 1792

==== Maryland ====
▌1. Charles Carroll (P), until November 30, 1792

▌Richard Potts (P), from February 4, 1793

▌3. John Henry (P)

==== Massachusetts ====
▌1. George Cabot (P)
▌2. Caleb Strong (P)

==== New Hampshire ====
▌2. Paine Wingate (A)
▌3. John Langdon (P)

==== New Jersey ====
▌1. John Rutherfurd (P)
▌2. Philemon Dickinson (P)

==== New York ====
▌1. Aaron Burr (A)
▌3. Rufus King (P)

==== North Carolina ====
▌2. Samuel Johnston (P)
▌3. Benjamin Hawkins (P)

==== Pennsylvania ====
▌1. Albert Gallatin (A), from February 28, 1793 (not formally installed until next Congress)
▌3. Robert Morris (P)

==== Rhode Island ====
▌1. Theodore Foster (P)
▌2. Joseph Stanton Jr. (A)

==== South Carolina ====
▌2. Pierce Butler (A)
▌3. Ralph Izard (P)

==== Vermont ====
▌1. Moses Robinson (A), from October 17, 1791
▌3. Stephen R. Bradley (A), from October 17, 1791

==== Virginia ====
▌2. Richard Henry Lee (A), until October 8, 1792

▌John Taylor of Caroline (A), from December 12, 1792

▌1. James Monroe (A)

Senators' party membership by state at the opening of the 2nd Congress in March 1791. 2 Anti-Administration 1 Anti-Administration and 1 Pro-Administration 2 Pro-Administration

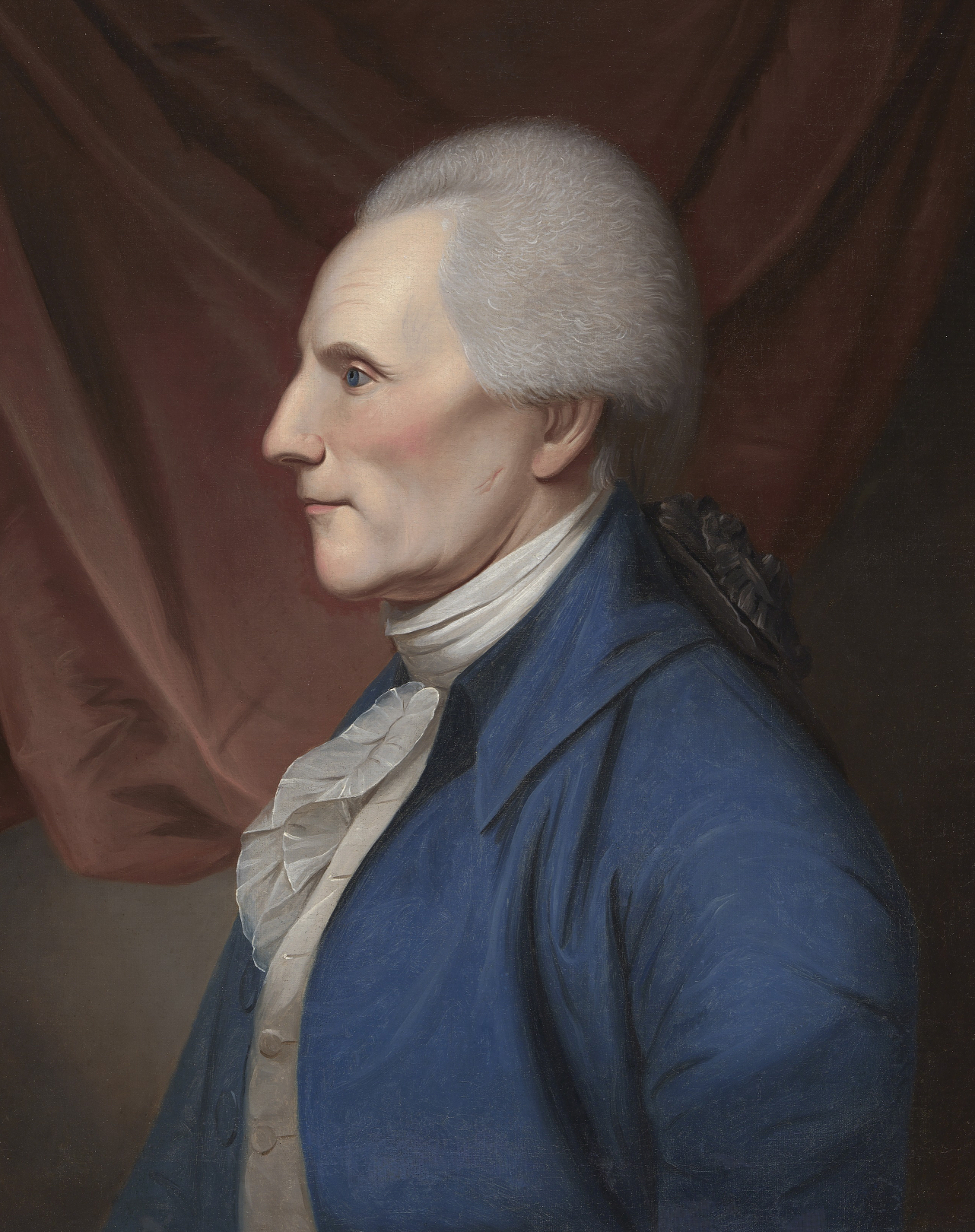
President pro tempore Richard Henry Lee

=== House of Representatives ===
The names of representatives are preceded by their districts.

==== Connecticut ====
All representatives were elected statewide on a general ticket.

▌At-large. James Hillhouse (P)
▌At-large. Amasa Learned (P)
▌At-large. Jonathan Sturges (P)
▌At-large. Jonathan Trumbull Jr. (P)
▌At-large. Jeremiah Wadsworth (P)

==== Delaware ====
▌At-large. John Vining (P)

==== Georgia ====
All representatives were elected statewide from individual districts.

▌1. Anthony Wayne (A), until March 21, 1792 (seat declared vacant)

▌John Milledge (A), from November 22, 1792

▌2. Abraham Baldwin (A)
▌3. Francis Willis (A)

==== Kentucky ====
▌1. Christopher Greenup (A), from November 9, 1792
▌2. Alexander D. Orr (A), from November 8, 1792

==== Maryland ====
All representatives were elected statewide from individual districts.

▌1. Philip Key (P)
▌2. Joshua Seney (A), until December 6, 1792

▌William Hindman (P), from January 30, 1793

▌3. William Pinkney (P), until November 9, 1791

▌John F. Mercer (A), from February 6, 1792

▌4. Samuel Sterett (A)
▌5. William Vans Murray (P)
▌6. Upton Sheredine (A)

==== Massachusetts ====
▌1. Fisher Ames (P)
▌2. Benjamin Goodhue (P)
▌3. Elbridge Gerry (A)
▌4. Theodore Sedgwick (P)
▌5. Shearjashub Bourne (P)
▌6. George Leonard (P), from April 2, 1792 (late election)
▌7. Artemas Ward (P)
▌8. George Thatcher (P), from April 4, 1791 (late election)

==== New Hampshire ====
All representatives were elected statewide on a general ticket.

▌At-large. Nicholas Gilman (P)
▌At-large. Samuel Livermore (P)
▌At-large. Jeremiah Smith (P)

==== New Jersey ====
All representatives were elected statewide on a general ticket.

▌At-large. Elias Boudinot (P)
▌At-large. Abraham Clark (P)
▌At-large. Jonathan Dayton (P)
▌At-large. Aaron Kitchell (A)

==== New York ====
▌1. Thomas Tredwell (A), from October 24, 1791
▌2. John Laurance (P)
▌3. Egbert Benson (P)
▌4. Cornelius C. Schoonmaker (A)
▌5. Peter Silvester (P)
▌6. James Gordon (P)

==== North Carolina ====
There was a special redistricting for this Congress.

▌1. John Steele (P)
▌2. Nathaniel Macon (A)
▌3. John Baptist Ashe (A)
▌4. Hugh Williamson (A)
▌5. William Barry Grove (P)

==== Pennsylvania ====
▌1. Thomas Fitzsimons (P)
▌2. Frederick Muhlenberg (A)
▌3. Israel Jacobs (P)
▌4. Daniel Hiester (A)
▌5. John W. Kittera (P)
▌6. Andrew Gregg (A)
▌7. Thomas Hartley (P)
▌8. William Findley (A)

==== Rhode Island ====
▌At-large. Benjamin Bourne (P)

==== South Carolina ====
▌1. William L. Smith (P)
▌2. Robert Barnwell (P)
▌3. Daniel Huger (P)
▌4. Thomas Sumter (A)
▌5. Thomas Tudor Tucker (A)

==== Vermont ====
▌1. Israel Smith (A), from October 31, 1791
▌2. Nathaniel Niles (A), from October 31, 1791

==== Virginia ====
▌1. Alexander White (P)
▌2. John Brown (A), until June 1, 1792 (when his district became Kentucky)

Vacant thereafter

▌3. Andrew Moore (A)
▌4. Richard Bland Lee (P)
▌5. James Madison (A)
▌6. Abraham B. Venable (A)
▌7. John Page (A)
▌8. Josiah Parker (P)
▌9. William B. Giles (A)
▌10. Samuel Griffin (A)

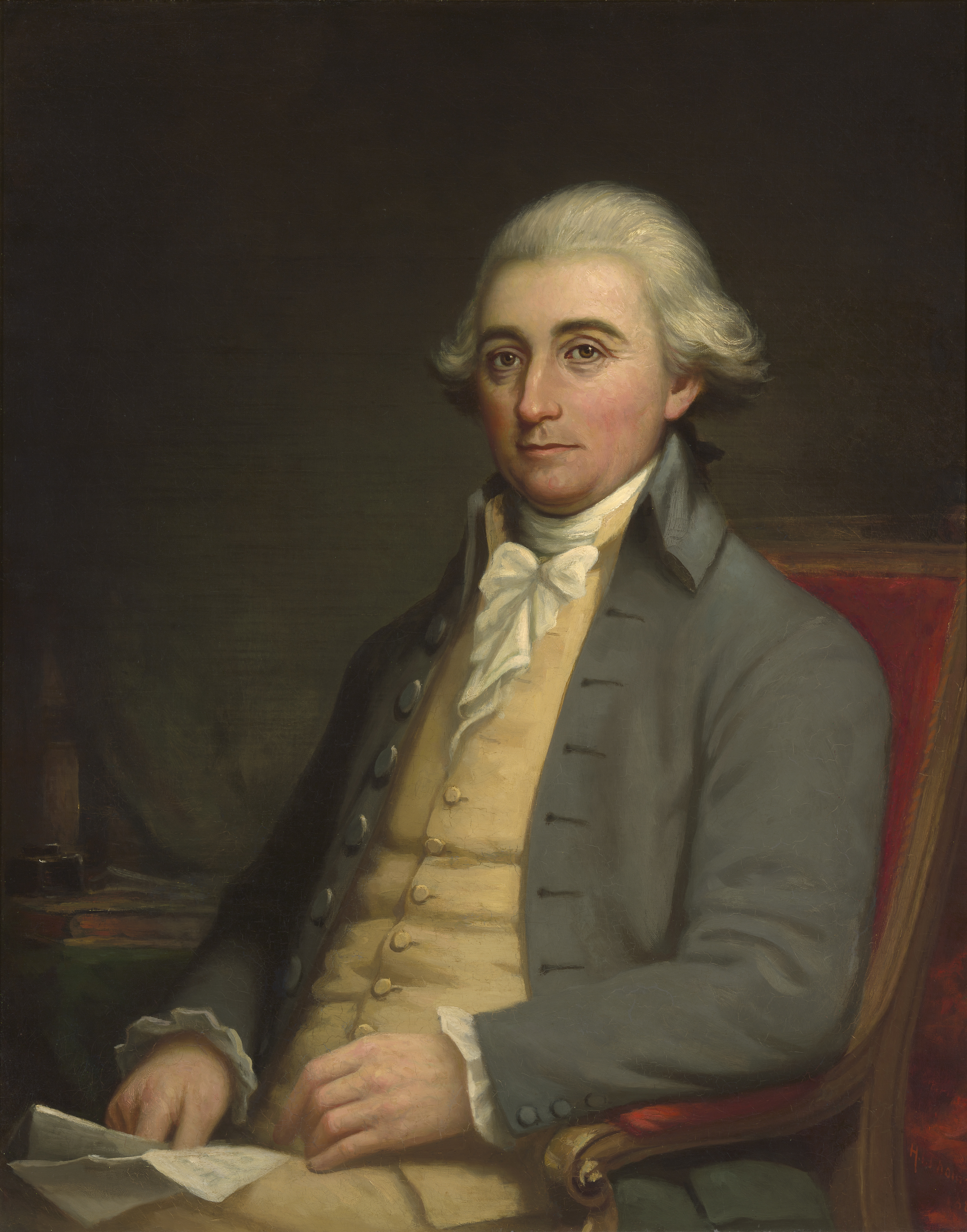
Speaker Jonathan Trumbull Jr.

== Membership changes ==
There were no political parties in this Congress. Members are informally grouped into factions of similar interest, based on an analysis of their voting record.

Vermont and Kentucky were newly admitted as states and are first represented in this Congress.

=== Senate ===
There were three resignations and four new seats of admitted states, resulting in a three-seat net gain of the Anti-Administration Senators.

Senate changes
State (class)	Vacated by	Reason for change	Successor	Date of successor's formal installation (Note: When seated or oath administered, not necessarily when service began.)
Connecticut (3)	William S. Johnson (P)	Resigned March 4, 1791. Successor elected June 13, 1791.	Roger Sherman (P)	June 13, 1791
Vermont (3)	New seat	Vermont was admitted to the Union March 4, 1791. Winners elected October 17, 1791.	Stephen R. Bradley (A)	November 4, 1791
Vermont (1)	New seat	Vermont was admitted to the Union March 4, 1791. Winners elected October 17, 1791.	Moses Robinson (A)	November 4, 1791
Kentucky (3)	New seat	Kentucky was admitted to the Union June 1, 1792. Winners elected June 18, 1792.	John Edwards (A)	June 18, 1792
Kentucky (2)	New seat	Kentucky was admitted to the Union June 1, 1792. Winners elected June 18, 1792.	John Brown (A)	June 18, 1792
Virginia (2)	Richard Henry Lee (A)	Resigned October 8, 1792. Successor elected October 18, 1792.	John Taylor (A)	October 18, 1792
Maryland (1)	Charles Carroll (P)	Resigned November 30, 1792. Successor elected January 10, 1793.	Richard Potts (P)	January 10, 1793

=== House of Representatives ===
There were 3 resignations, 1 vacancy of a member-elect, 1 contested election, 2 late elections, and 4 new seats of admitted states, resulting in a 3-seat net gain of the Anti-Administration members and a 1-seat net gain of the Pro-Administration members.

House changes
District	Vacated by	Reason for change	Successor	Date of successor's formal installation
Massachusetts 8th	Vacant	Due to failure to reach a majority, four ballots were needed to elect. Incumbent was elected late April 4, 1791.	George Thatcher (P)	April 4, 1791
New York 1st	Vacant	Representative-elect James Townsend died on May 24, 1790, before Congress assembled.	Thomas Tredwell (A)	October 24, 1791
Vermont 1st	New seat	Vermont was admitted to the Union on March 4, 1791.	Israel Smith (A)	October 24, 1791
Vermont 2nd	New seat	Vermont was admitted to the Union on March 4, 1791.	Nathaniel Niles (A)	October 24, 1791
Maryland 3rd	William Pinkney (P)	Resigned November 1791	John Francis Mercer (A)	February 6, 1792
Massachusetts 6th	Vacant	Due to failure to reach a majority, eight ballots were needed to elect. Incumbent was elected late April 2, 1792.	George Leonard (P)	April 2, 1792
Virginia 2nd	John Brown (A)	Resigned June 1, 1792, to become U.S. Senator from Kentucky.	Vacant	Seat went with Kentucky
Kentucky 2nd	New seat	Kentucky was admitted to the Union on June 1, 1792.	Alexander D. Orr (A)	November 8, 1792
Kentucky 1st	New seat	Kentucky was admitted to the Union on June 1, 1792.	Christopher Greenup (A)	November 9, 1792
Georgia 1st	Anthony Wayne (A)	Anthony Wayne served until March 21, 1792, when seat declared vacant because the election was contested	John Milledge (A)	November 22, 1792
Maryland 2nd	Joshua Seney (A)	Resigned December 6, 1792.	William Hindman (P)	January 30, 1793

== Committees ==
Lists of committees and their party leaders.

=== Senate ===
- Whole

=== House of Representatives ===
- Elections (Chairman: Samuel Livermore)
- Rules (Select)
- Whole

=== Joint committees ===
- Enrolled Bills (Chairman: John Rutherfurd)

== Employees ==
=== Senate ===
- Secretary: Samuel A. Otis
- Doorkeeper: James Mathers
- Chaplain: William White (Episcopalian)

=== House of Representatives ===
- Clerk: John Beckley
- Sergeant at Arms: Joseph Wheaton
- Doorkeeper: Gifford Dalley
- Chaplain:
  - Samuel Blair Presbyterian
  - Ashbel Green, Presbyterian, elected November 5, 1792

== See also ==
- 1790 United States elections (elections leading to this Congress)
  - 1790–91 United States Senate elections
  - 1790–91 United States House of Representatives elections
- 1792 United States elections (elections during this Congress, leading to the next Congress)
  - 1792 United States presidential election
  - 1792–93 United States Senate elections
  - 1792–93 United States House of Representatives elections
