= 3rd United States Congress =

Legislative term from 1793-1795

←	2nd	4th	→
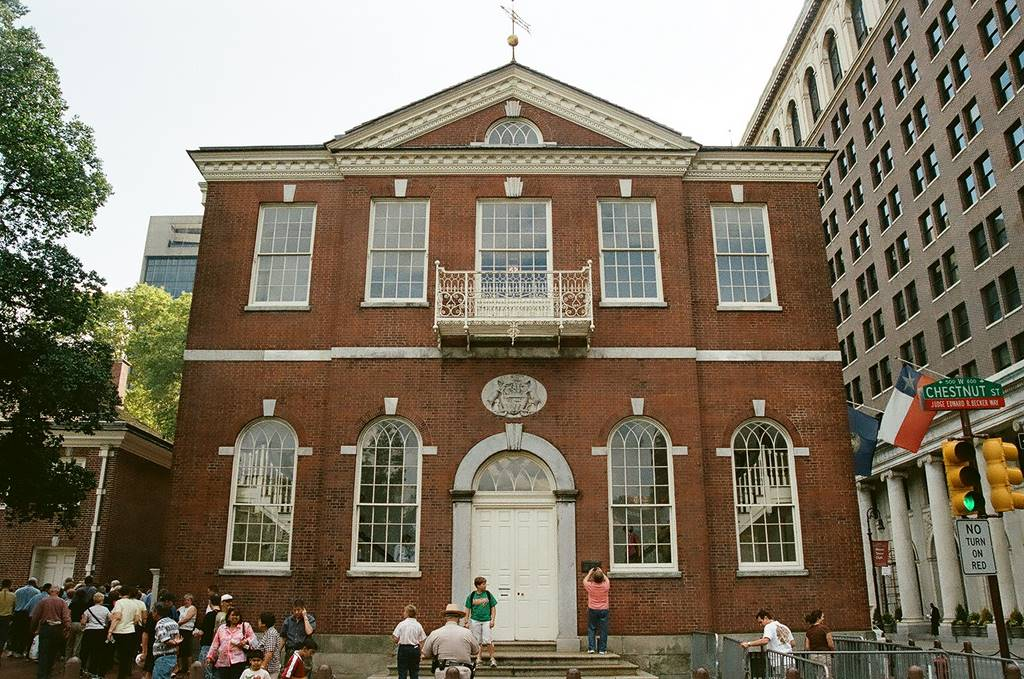
- Congress Hall (2007)

Overview
- Legislative body: United States Congress
- Jurisdiction: United States
- Term: March 4, 1793 – March 3, 1795

Senate
- Members: 30
- President: John Adams (P)
- President pro tempore: John Langdon (P); Ralph Izard (P); Henry Tazewell (P)
- Party control: Pro-Administration

House of Representatives
- Members: 105 representatives 1 non-voting delegates
- Speaker: Frederick Muhlenberg (A)
- Party control: Anti-Administration

Sessions
- Special (Note: Special session of the Senate.): March 4, 1793 – March 4, 1793
- 1st: December 2, 1793 – June 9, 1794
- 2nd: November 3, 1794 – March 3, 1795

The 3rd United States Congress was a meeting of the legislative branch of the United States federal government, consisting of the United States Senate and the United States House of Representatives. It met at Congress Hall in Philadelphia, Pennsylvania from March 4, 1793, to March 4, 1795, during the fifth and sixth years of George Washington's presidency.

The apportionment of seats in the House of Representatives was governed by the Apportionment Act of 1792 and based on the 1790 census. The Senate had a Pro-Administration majority, and the House had an Anti-Administration majority.

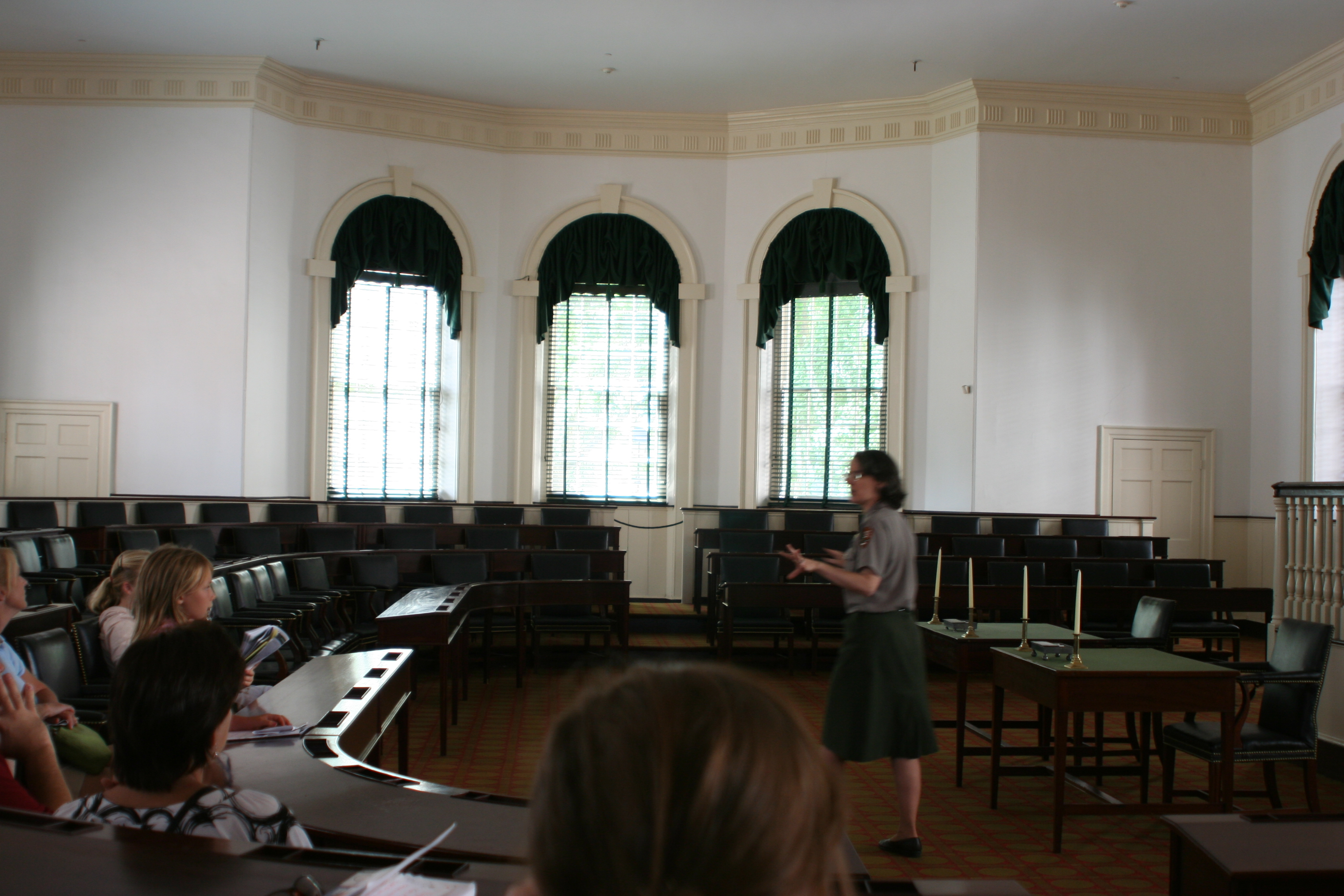
House of Representatives chamber at Congress Hall

== Major events ==
- March 4, 1793: President George Washington begins his second term.
- April 22, 1793: George Washington signed the Neutrality Proclamation.
- February 11, 1794: Wishing to avoid charges of being a Star Chamber, the Senate holds its first public session, resolving "That the Senate doors be opened".
- March 14, 1794: Eli Whitney was granted a patent for the cotton gin.
- March 27, 1794: The federal government authorized the construction of the original six frigates of the United States Navy.
- August 7, 1794: Whiskey Rebellion began: Farmers in the Monongahela Valley of Pennsylvania rebelled against the federal tax on liquor and distilled drinks.
- August 20, 1794: Battle of Fallen Timbers — American troops under General Anthony Wayne forced a confederacy of Shawnee, Mingo, Delaware, Wyandot, Miami, Ottawa, Chippewa and Pottawatomie warriors into a disorganized retreat.

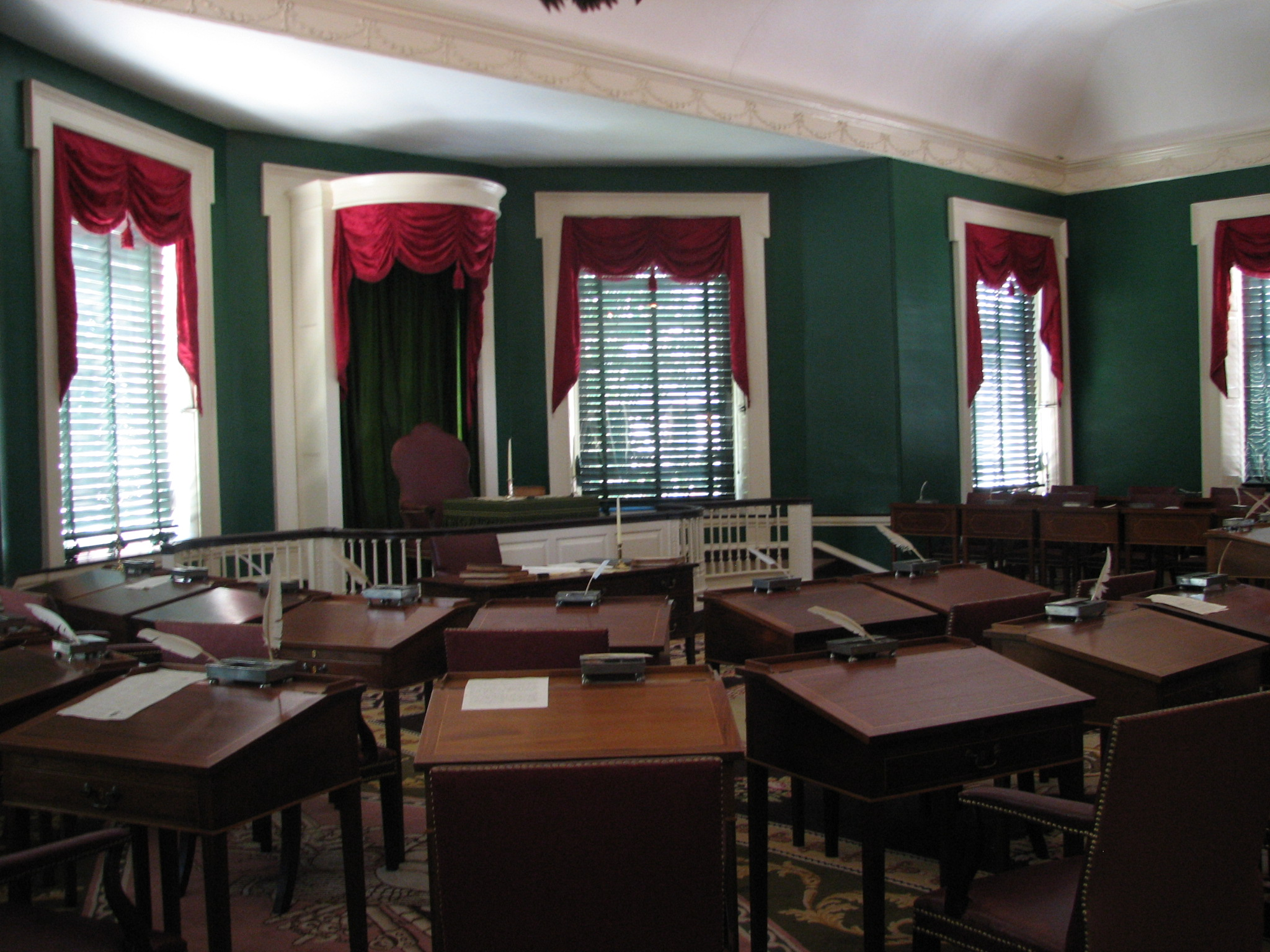
Senate chamber at Congress Hall

== Major legislation ==
- January 13, 1794: Flag Act of 1794, Sess. 1, ch. 1, 1 Stat. 341
- March 22, 1794: Slave Trade Act of 1794, Sess. 1, ch. 11, 1 Stat. 347
- March 27, 1794: Naval Act of 1794, Sess. 1, ch. 12, 1 Stat. 350
- January 29, 1795: Naturalization Act of 1795, Sess. 2, ch. 20, 1 Stat. 414

== Constitutional amendments ==
- March 4, 1794: Approved an amendment to the United States Constitution clarifying judicial power over foreign nationals, and limiting the ability of citizens to sue states in federal courts and under federal law, and submitted it to the state legislatures for ratification 1 Stat. 402.
  - February 7, 1795: The Eleventh Amendment to the United States Constitution was ratified by the requisite number of states (then 12) to become part of the Constitution.

== Treaties ==
- November 19, 1794: The United States and the Kingdom of Great Britain signed the Jay Treaty, which attempted to clear up some of the lingering problems left over from the American Revolutionary War

== Faction summary ==
There were no political parties in this Congress. Members are informally grouped into factions of similar interest, based on an analysis of their voting record.

Details on changes are shown below in the "Changes in membership" section.

=== Senate ===
	Faction (shading shows control)		Total	Vacant
	Anti- Administration (A)	Pro- Administration (P)	Total	Vacant
End of previous congress	13	17	30	0
Begin	14	16	30	0
End	13	17	30	0
Final voting share	43.3%	56.7%		
Beginning of next congress	10 (Note: Democratic-Republican)	20 (Note: Federalist)	30	2

=== House of Representatives ===
Members of the House of Representatives as shared by each state

	Faction (shading shows control)		Total	Vacant
	Anti- Administration (A)	Pro- Administration (P)	Total	Vacant
End of previous congress	29	39	68	1
Begin	55	50	105	0
End	54	49	103	2
Final voting share	52.4%	47.6%		
Non-voting members	1	0	1	0
Beginning of next congress	58 (Note: Democratic-Republican)	46 (Note: Federalist)	104	1

== Leadership ==
=== Senate ===
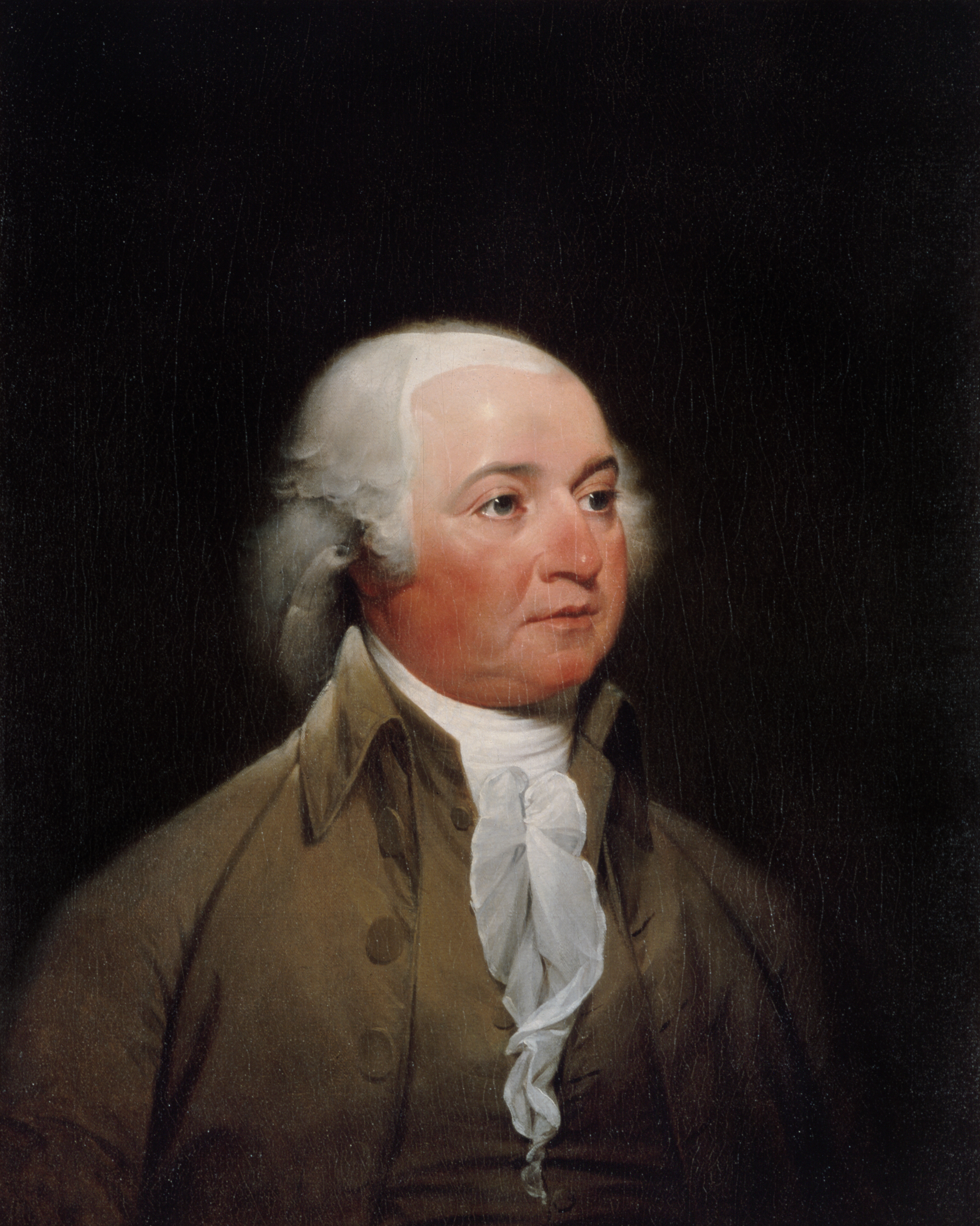
Senate President John Adams

- President: John Adams (P)
- President pro tempore: John Langdon (P), until December 2, 1793
  - Ralph Izard (P), May 31, 1794 – November 9, 1794
  - Henry Tazewell (P), from February 20, 1795

=== House of Representatives ===
- Speaker: Frederick Muhlenberg (A)

== Members ==
This list is arranged by chamber, then by state. Senators are listed by class, and representatives are listed by district.

Skip to House of Representatives, below

=== Senate ===
Senators were elected by the state legislatures every two years, with one-third beginning new six-year terms with each Congress. Preceding the names in the list below are Senate class numbers, which indicate the cycle of their election.

==== Connecticut ====
▌1. Oliver Ellsworth (P)
▌3. Roger Sherman (P), until July 23, 1793

▌Stephen Mitchell (P), from December 2, 1793

==== Delaware ====
▌1. George Read (P), until September 18, 1793

▌Henry Latimer (P), from February 7, 1795

▌2. John Vining (P)

==== Georgia ====
▌2. James Jackson (A)
▌3. James Gunn (A)

==== Kentucky ====
▌2. John Brown (A)
▌3. John Edwards (A)

==== Maryland ====
▌1. Richard Potts (P)
▌3. John Henry (P)

==== Massachusetts ====
▌1. George Cabot (P)
▌2. Caleb Strong (P)

==== New Hampshire ====
▌2. Samuel Livermore (P)
▌3. John Langdon (A)

==== New Jersey ====
▌1. John Rutherfurd (P)
▌2. Frederick Frelinghuysen (P)

==== New York ====
▌1. Aaron Burr (A)
▌3. Rufus King (P)

==== North Carolina ====
▌2. Alexander Martin (A)
▌3. Benjamin Hawkins (A)

==== Pennsylvania ====
▌1. Albert Gallatin (A), until February 28, 1794

▌James Ross (P), from April 24, 1794

▌3. Robert Morris (P)

==== Rhode Island ====
▌1. Theodore Foster (P)
▌2. William Bradford (P)

==== South Carolina ====
▌2. Pierce Butler (A)
▌3. Ralph Izard (P)

==== Vermont ====
▌1. Moses Robinson (A)
▌3. Stephen R. Bradley (A)

==== Virginia ====
▌1. James Monroe (A), until May 27, 1794

▌Stevens Mason (A), from November 18, 1794

▌2. John Taylor of Caroline (A), until May 11, 1794

▌Henry Tazewell (A), from December 29, 1794

Senators' party membership by state at the opening of the 3rd Congress in March 1793. 2 Anti-Administration 1 Anti-Administration and 1 Pro-Administration 2 Pro-Administration

Senate presidents pro tempore

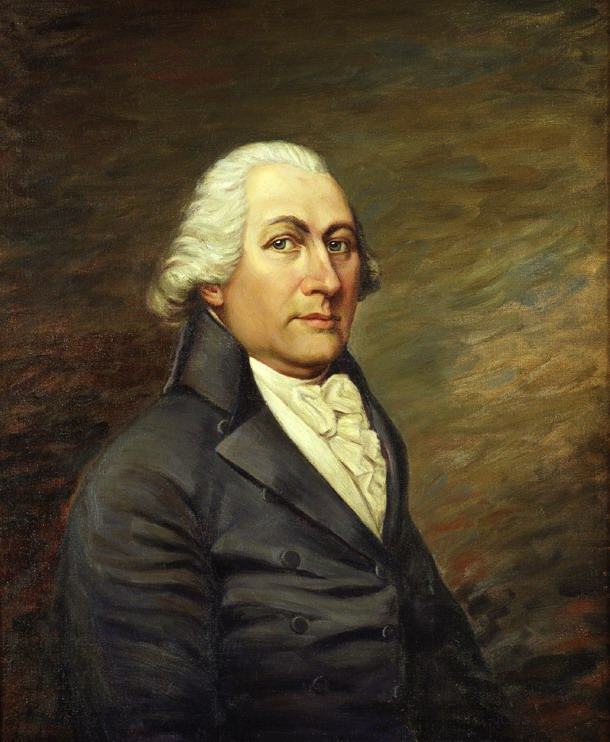
John Langdon
(until December 2, 1793)

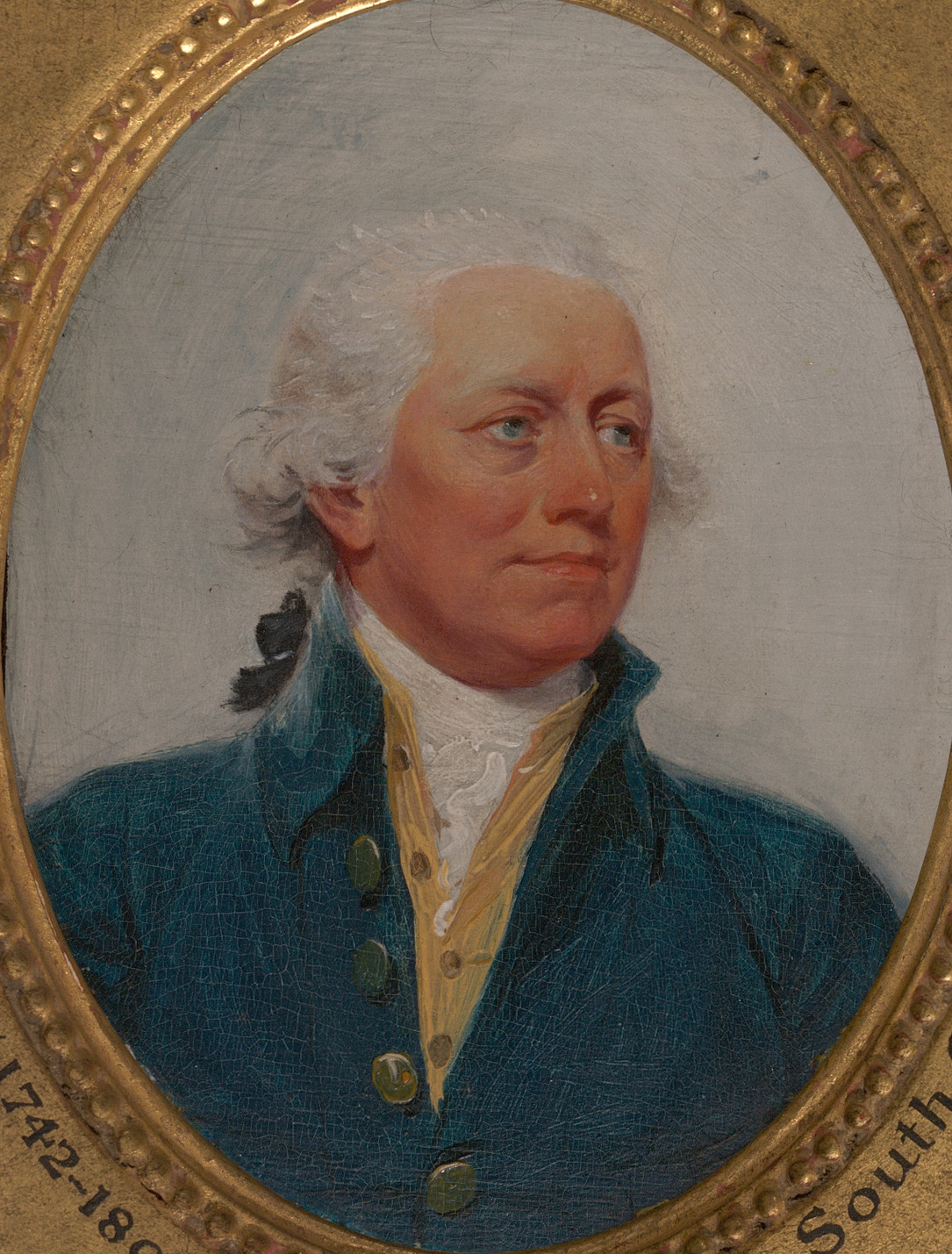
Ralph Izard
(May 31, 1794 – November 9, 1794)

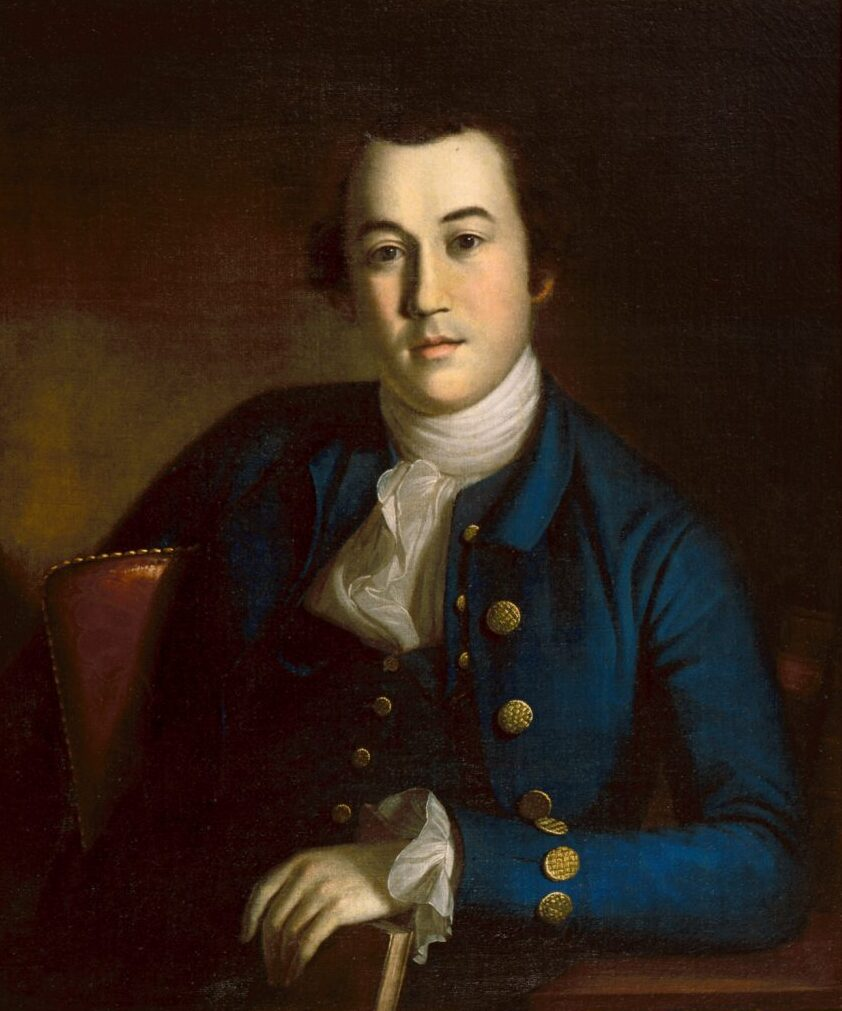
Henry Tazewell
(from February 20, 1795)

=== House of Representatives ===
The names of representatives are preceded by their district numbers.

==== Connecticut ====
All representatives were elected statewide on a general ticket.

▌At-large. Joshua Coit (P)
▌At-large. James Hillhouse (P)
▌At-large. Amasa Learned (P)
▌At-large. Zephaniah Swift (P)
▌At-large. Uriah Tracy (P)
▌At-large. Jonathan Trumbull Jr. (P)
▌At-large. Jeremiah Wadsworth (P)

==== Delaware ====
▌At-large. John Patten (A), until February 14, 1794

▌Henry Latimer (P), February 14, 1794 – February 7, 1795
Vacant thereafter

==== Georgia ====
Both representatives were elected statewide on a general ticket.

▌At-large. Abraham Baldwin (A)
▌At-large. Thomas P. Carnes (A)

==== Kentucky ====
▌1. Christopher Greenup (A)
▌2. Alexander D. Orr (A)

==== Maryland ====
▌1. George Dent (P)
▌2. John Mercer (A), until April 13, 1794

▌Gabriel Duvall (A), from November 11, 1794

▌3. Uriah Forrest (P), until November 8, 1794

▌Benjamin Edwards (P), from January 2, 1795

▌4. Thomas Sprigg (A)
▌5. Samuel Smith (A)
▌6. Gabriel Christie (A)
▌7. William Hindman (P)
▌8. William Vans Murray (P)

==== Massachusetts ====
There was a single at-large seat along with four plural districts, each of which had multiple representatives elected at-large on a general ticket.

▌1a. Fisher Ames (P)
▌1b. Samuel Dexter (P)
▌1c. Benjamin Goodhue (P)
▌1d. Samuel Holten (A)
▌2a. Dwight Foster (P)
▌2b. William Lyman (A)
▌2c. Theodore Sedgwick (P)
▌2d. Artemas Ward (P)
▌3a. Shearjashub Bourne (P)
▌3b. Peleg Coffin Jr. (P)
▌4a. Henry Dearborn (A)
▌4b. George Thatcher (P)
▌4c. Peleg Wadsworth (P)
▌At-large. David Cobb (P)

==== New Hampshire ====
All representatives were elected statewide on a general ticket.

▌At-large. Nicholas Gilman (P)
▌At-large. John Sherburne (A)
▌At-large. Jeremiah Smith (P)
▌At-large. Paine Wingate (P)

==== New Jersey ====
All representatives were elected statewide on a general ticket.

▌At-large. John Beatty (P)
▌At-large. Elias Boudinot (P)
▌At-large. Lambert Cadwalader (P)
▌At-large. Abraham Clark (P), until September 15, 1794

▌Aaron Kitchell (A), from January 29, 1795

▌At-large. Jonathan Dayton (P)

==== New York ====
▌1. Thomas Tredwell (A)
▌2. John Watts (P)
▌3. Philip Van Cortlandt (A)
▌4. Peter Van Gaasbeck (P)
▌5. Theodorus Bailey (A)
▌6. Ezekiel Gilbert (P)
▌7. John E. Van Alen (P)
▌8. Henry Glen (P)
▌9. James Gordon (P)
▌10. Silas Talbot (P), until June 5, 1794

Vacant thereafter

==== North Carolina ====
▌1. Joseph McDowell (A)
▌2. Matthew Locke (A)
▌3. Joseph Winston (A)
▌4. Alexander Mebane (A)
▌5. Nathaniel Macon (A)
▌6. James Gillespie (A)
▌7. William Barry Grove (P)
▌8. William Johnston Dawson (A)
▌9. Thomas Blount (A)
▌10. Benjamin Williams (A)

==== Pennsylvania ====
All representatives were elected statewide on a general ticket.

▌At-large. James Armstrong (P)
▌At-large. William Findley (A)
▌At-large. Thomas Fitzsimons (P)
▌At-large. Andrew Gregg (A)
▌At-large. Thomas Hartley (P)
▌At-large. Daniel Hiester (A)
▌At-large. William Irvine (A)
▌At-large. John Wilkes Kittera (P)
▌At-large. William Montgomery (A)
▌At-large. Frederick A. C. Muhlenberg (A)
▌At-large. John Peter G. Muhlenberg (A)
▌At-large. Thomas Scott (P)
▌At-large. John Smilie (A)

==== Rhode Island ====
Both representatives were elected statewide on a general ticket.

▌At-large. Benjamin Bourne (P)
▌At-large. Francis Malbone (P)

==== South Carolina ====
▌1. William L. Smith (P)
▌2. John Hunter (A)
▌3. Lemuel Benton (A)
▌4. Richard Winn (A)
▌5. Alexander Gillon (A), until October 6, 1794

▌Robert Goodloe Harper (P), from February 9, 1795

▌6. Andrew Pickens (A)

==== Vermont ====
▌1. Israel Smith (A)
▌2. Nathaniel Niles (A)

==== Virginia ====
▌1. Robert Rutherford (A)
▌2. Andrew Moore (A)
▌3. Joseph Neville (A)
▌4. Francis Preston (A)
▌5. George Hancock (P)
▌6. Isaac Coles (A)
▌7. Abraham B. Venable (A)
▌8. Thomas Claiborne (A)
▌9. William B. Giles (A)
▌10. Carter B. Harrison (A)
▌11. Josiah Parker (P)
▌12. John Page (A)
▌13. Samuel Griffin (P)
▌14. Francis Walker (A)
▌15. James Madison (A)
▌16. Anthony New (A)
▌17. Richard Bland Lee (P)
▌18. John Nicholas (A)
▌19. John Heath (A)

==== Non-voting members ====
Territory South of the River Ohio ("Southwest Territory", later "Tennessee"). James White, seated September 3, 1794

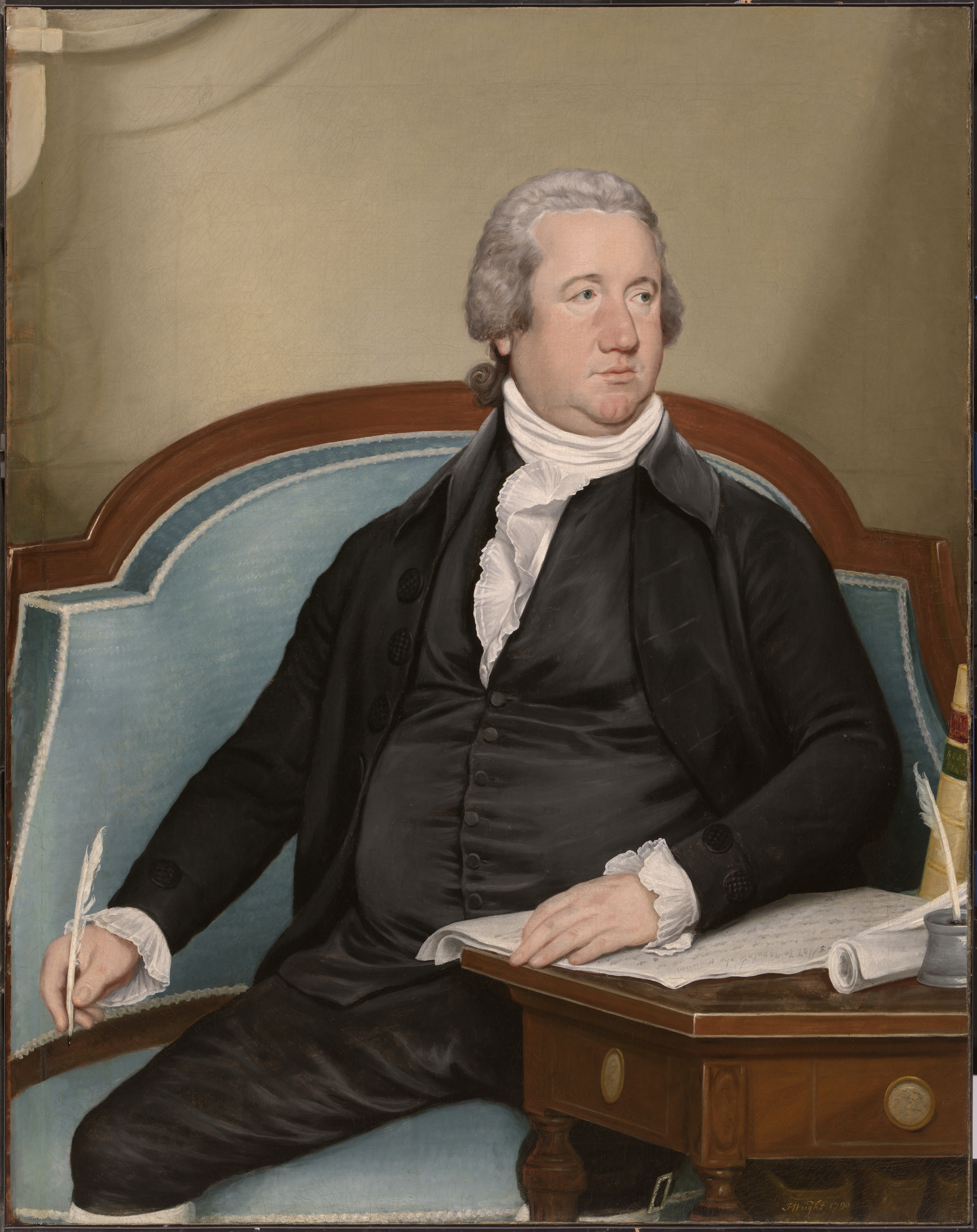
Speaker of the House of Representatives Frederick Muhlenberg

== Changes in membership ==
The count below reflects changes from the beginning of the first session of this Congress

=== United States Senate ===
There were 1 death, 3 resignations, 1 late election, and 1 contested election.

Senate changes
State (class)	Vacated by	Reason for change	Successor	Date of successor's formal installation (Note: When seated or oath administered, not necessarily when service began.)
Pennsylvania (1)	Vacant	Legislature failed to elect senator during the previous Congress. Successor elected February 28, 1793, but not seated until this Congress.	Albert Gallatin (A)	Seated December 2, 1793
Connecticut (3)	Roger Sherman (P)	Died July 23, 1793.	Stephen M. Mitchell (P)	Elected December 2, 1793
Delaware (1)	George Read (P)	Resigned on September 18, 1793. Kensey Johns was appointed on March 19, 1794, but not permitted to qualify.	Henry Latimer (P)	Appointed February 7, 1795
Pennsylvania (1)	Albert Gallatin (A)	Credentials were contested and the seat was declared vacant February 28, 1794.	James Ross (P)	Elected April 24, 1794
Virginia (1)	James Monroe (A)	Resigned May 11, 1794, to become United States Minister to France.	Stevens T. Mason (A)	Elected November 18, 1794
Virginia (2)	John Taylor (A)	Resigned May 11, 1794.	Henry Tazewell (A)	Elected November 18, 1794

=== House of Representatives ===
There were 2 deaths, 3 resignations, and 1 contested election.

House changes
District	Vacated by	Reason for change	Successor	Date of successor's formal installation
Delaware at-large	John Patten (A)	Contested election; served until February 14, 1794.	Henry Latimer (P)	Seated February 14, 1794
Territory South of the River Ohio	Vacant	Delegate seat established.	James White Non-voting delegate	Elected September 3, 1794
Maryland 2nd	John Francis Mercer (A)	Resigned April 13, 1794.	Gabriel Duvall (A)	Seated November 11, 1794
New York 10th	Silas Talbot (P)	Accepted appointment to the U.S. Navy June 5, 1794.	Vacant	Not filled in this Congress
New Jersey at-large	Abraham Clark (P)	Died September 15, 1794.	Aaron Kitchell (P)	Seated January 29, 1795
South Carolina 5th	Alexander Gillon (A)	Died October 6, 1794.	Robert Goodloe Harper (P)	Seated February 9, 1795
Maryland 3rd	Uriah Forrest (P)	Resigned November 8, 1794.	Benjamin Edwards (P)	Seated January 2, 1795
Delaware at-large	Henry Latimer (P)	Resigned February 7, 1795, having been elected U.S. Senator.	Vacant	Not filled in this Congress

== Committees ==
Lists of committees and their party leaders.

=== Senate ===
- Whole

=== House of Representatives ===
- Claims (Chairman: Uriah Tracy)
- Elections (Chairman: William Loughton Smith then Jonathan Dayton)
- Rules (Select)
- Ways and Means (Chairman: William Loughton Smith)
- Whole

=== Joint committees ===
- Enrolled Bills (Chairman: John Rutherfurd)

== Employees ==
- Architect of the Capitol: William Thornton

=== Senate ===
- Chaplain: William White (Episcopalian)
- Doorkeeper: James Mathers
- Secretary: Samuel Allyne Otis

=== House of Representatives ===
- Chaplain: Ashbel Green (Presbyterian)
- Clerk: John J. Beckley
- Doorkeeper: Gifford Dalley
- Sergeant at Arms: Joseph Wheaton

== See also ==
- 1792 United States elections (elections leading to this Congress)
  - 1792 United States presidential election
  - 1792–93 United States Senate elections
  - 1792–93 United States House of Representatives elections
- 1794 United States elections (elections during this Congress, leading to the next Congress)
  - 1794–95 United States Senate elections
  - 1794–95 United States House of Representatives elections
