= 1794–95 United States Senate elections =

- Dates vary by state
- Class 3

10 of the 30 seats in the United States Senate (plus special elections) 16 seats needed for a majority
	Majority party	Minority party
Party	Federalist	Democratic-Republican
Seats before	16 (as Pro-Administration)	13 (as Anti-Administration)
Seats after	19	10
Seat change	▲3	▼3
Seats up	5 (as Pro-Administration)	5 (as Anti-Administration)
Races won	8	2
- Federalist hold Federalist gain Democratic-Republican hold
Majority Faction before election
Pro-Administration
Elected Majority Faction
Federalist

The 1794–95 United States Senate elections were held on various dates in various states. As these U.S. Senate elections were prior to the ratification of the Seventeenth Amendment in 1913, senators were chosen by state legislatures. Senators were elected over a wide range of time throughout 1794 and 1795, and a seat may have been filled months late or remained vacant due to legislative deadlock. In these elections, terms were up for the senators in Class 3.

This was the first election cycle with organized political parties in the United States, with the Federalist Party emerging from the Pro Administration coalition, and the Democratic-Republican Party emerging from the Anti-Administration coalition.

== Results summary ==
Senate party division, 4th Congress (1795–1797)

- Majority party: Federalist (20)
- Minority party: Democratic-Republican (10)
- Other parties: 0
- Total seats: 30

== Change in composition ==
=== Before the elections ===
Note: There were no political parties in the 3rd Congress. Members are informally grouped here into factions of similar interest, based on an analysis of their voting record.

After the March 31, 1794 special election in Pennsylvania.

A_{5}	A_{4}	A_{3}	A_{2}	A_{1}					
A_{6}	A_{7}	A_{8}	A_{9} Ga. Ran	A_{10} Ky. Unknown	A_{11} N.H. Ran	A_{12} N.C. Unknown	A_{13} Vt. Ran	V_{1} Del.	P_{16} S.C. Retired
Majority →									P_{16} S.C. Retired
P_{6}	P_{7}	P_{8}	P_{9}	P_{10}	P_{11}	P_{12} Conn. Retired	P_{13} Md. Ran	P_{14} N.Y. Ran	P_{15} Pa. Retired
P_{5}	P_{4}	P_{3}	P_{2}	P_{1}					

=== Results of the elections ===
A_{5}	A_{4}	A_{3}	A_{2}	A_{1}					
A_{6}	A_{7}	A_{8}	DR_{1} N.H. Gain from A	DR_{2} N.C. Gain from A	V_{1} Del.	F_{8} Vt. Gain from A	F_{7} S.C. Gain from P	F_{6} Pa. Gain from P	F_{5} N.Y. Gain from P
									F_{4} Md. Gain from P
P_{6}	P_{7}	P_{8}	P_{9}	P_{10}	P_{11}	F_{1} Conn. Gain from P	F_{2} Ga. Gain from A	F_{3} Ky. Gain from A	F_{4} Md. Gain from P
P_{5}	P_{4}	P_{3}	P_{2}	P_{1}					

=== Beginning of the next Congress ===
Seven senators who were considered "Anti-Administration" became Democratic-Republicans and eleven "Pro-Administration" became Federalists.

DR_{5} Changed	DR_{4} Changed	DR_{3} Changed	DR_{2} Changed	DR_{1} Changed					
DR_{6} Changed	DR_{7} Changed	DR_{8} Changed	DR_{9}	DR_{10}	F_{20} Del. Gain	F_{19}	F_{18}	F_{17}	F_{16}
Majority →									F_{16}
F_{6} Changed	F_{7} Changed	F_{8} Changed	F_{9} Changed	F_{10} Changed	F_{11} Changed	F_{12}	F_{13}	F_{14}	F_{15}
F_{5} Changed	F_{4} Changed	F_{3} Changed	F_{2} Changed	F_{1} Changed					

Key:

A_{#}	Anti-Administration
DR_{#}	Democratic-Republican
F_{#}	Federalist
P_{#}	Pro-Administration
V_{#}	Vacant

== Race summaries ==
Except if/when noted, the number following candidates is the whole number vote(s), not a percentage.

=== Special elections during the 3rd Congress ===
In these special elections, the winner was seated before March 4, 1795; ordered by election date.

State	Incumbent			Results	Candidates
State	Senator	Party	First elected	Results	Candidates
Pennsylvania (Class 1)	Albert Gallatin	Anti-Administration	[[1794 United States Senate special election in Pennsylvania|1793 (special)]]	Incumbent disqualified February 28, 1794. New senator elected March 31, 1794. Pro-Administration gain. Winner became a Federalist in the next Congress.	▌ ✓ James Ross (Pro-Admin.) 51.72%; ▌Robert Coleman (Unknown) 40.23%; ▌Samuel Sitgreaves (Federalist) 1.15%; Not voting 6.7%
Virginia (Class 1)	James Monroe	Anti-Administration	[[1790 United States Senate special election in Virginia|1790 (special)]]	Incumbent resigned May 11, 1794 to become U.S. Minister to France. New senator elected November 18, 1794. Anti-Administration hold. Winner became a Democratic-Republican in the next Congress.	▌ ✓ Stevens Thomson Mason (Anti-Admin.); [data missing]
Virginia (Class 2)	John Taylor	Anti-Administration	[[1792 United States Senate special election in Virginia|1792 (special)]]	Incumbent resigned May 11, 1794. New senator elected November 18, 1794. Anti-Administration hold. Winner became a Democratic-Republican in the next Congress.	▌ ✓ Henry Tazewell (Anti-Admin.); [data missing]
Delaware (Class 1)	Vacant			George Read (P) resigned September 18, 1793 to become Chief Justice of Delaware. New senator elected February 7, 1795. Pro-Administration gain. Winner became a Federalist in the next Congress.	▌ ✓ Henry Latimer (Pro-Admin.) 15; ▌John Dickinson (Anti-Admin.) 14

=== Races leading to the 4th Congress ===
In these regular elections, the winner was seated on March 4, 1795; ordered by state.

All of the elections involved the Class 3 seats.

State	Incumbent			Results	Candidates
State	Senator	Party	First elected	Results	Candidates
Connecticut	Stephen Mitchell	Pro-Administration	1793 (appointed)	Incumbent appointee retired. New senator's election date unknown. Federalist gain.	▌ ✓ Jonathan Trumbull, Jr. (Federalist); [data missing]
Georgia	James Gunn	Anti-Administration	1789	Incumbent re-elected November 13, 1794 as a Federalist. Federalist gain.	▌ ✓ James Gunn (Federalist) 36; ▌Edward Telfair (Unknown) 12; ▌William Few (Unknown) 3
Kentucky	John Edwards	Anti-Administration	[[1792 United States Senate elections in Kentucky|1792 (new state)]]	Incumbent retired or lost re-election. New senator elected in 1794 on the second ballot. Federalist gain.	▌ ✓ Humphrey Marshall (Federalist) 28; ▌John Breckinridge (Democratic-Republican) 22
Maryland	John Henry	Pro-Administration	1788	Incumbent re-elected in 1795 as a Federalist. Federalist gain.	▌ ✓ John Henry (Federalist); [data missing]
New Hampshire	John Langdon	Anti-Administration	1788	Incumbent re-elected on an unknown date as a Democratic-Republican. Democratic-Republican gain.	▌ ✓ John Langdon (Democratic-Republican); [data missing]
New York	Rufus King	Pro-Administration	1789	Incumbent re-elected January 27, 1795 to a new party. Federalist gain.	▌ ✓ Rufus King (Federalist) 47; ▌Thomas Tillotson (Federalist) 30; ▌John Lawrence (Federalist) 1
North Carolina	Benjamin Hawkins	Anti-Administration	1789	Incumbent retired or lost re-election. New senator elected in 1795 on the fifth ballot. Democratic-Republican gain.	▌ ✓ Timothy Bloodworth (Democratic-Republican); ▌John Leigh (Unknown); ▌Alfred Moore (Federalist); ▌Nathaniel Macon (Democratic-Republican) Withdrew; ▌John Skinner (Unknown) Withdrew; ▌Charles Johnson (Democratic-Republican) Withdrew; ▌William Lenoir (Unknown)
Pennsylvania	Robert Morris	Pro-Administration	1788	Incumbent retired. New senator elected February 26, 1795. Federalist gain.	▌ ✓ William Bingham (Federalist) 58; ▌Peter Muhlenberg (Democratic-Republican) 35
South Carolina	Ralph Izard	Pro-Administration	1789	Incumbent retired. New senator elected in 1794 on the second ballot. Federalist gain.	▌ ✓ Jacob Read (Federalist); ▌John Hunter (Democratic-Republican)
Vermont	Stephen R. Bradley	Anti-Administration	[[1791 United States Senate elections in Vermont|1791 (new state)]]	Incumbent lost re-election. New senator elected in 1794. Federalist gain.	▌ ✓ Elijah Paine (Federalist); [data missing]

=== Elections during the 4th Congress ===
There were no elections in 1795 after March 4.

== Delaware (special) ==
Delaware special election
- February 7, 1795
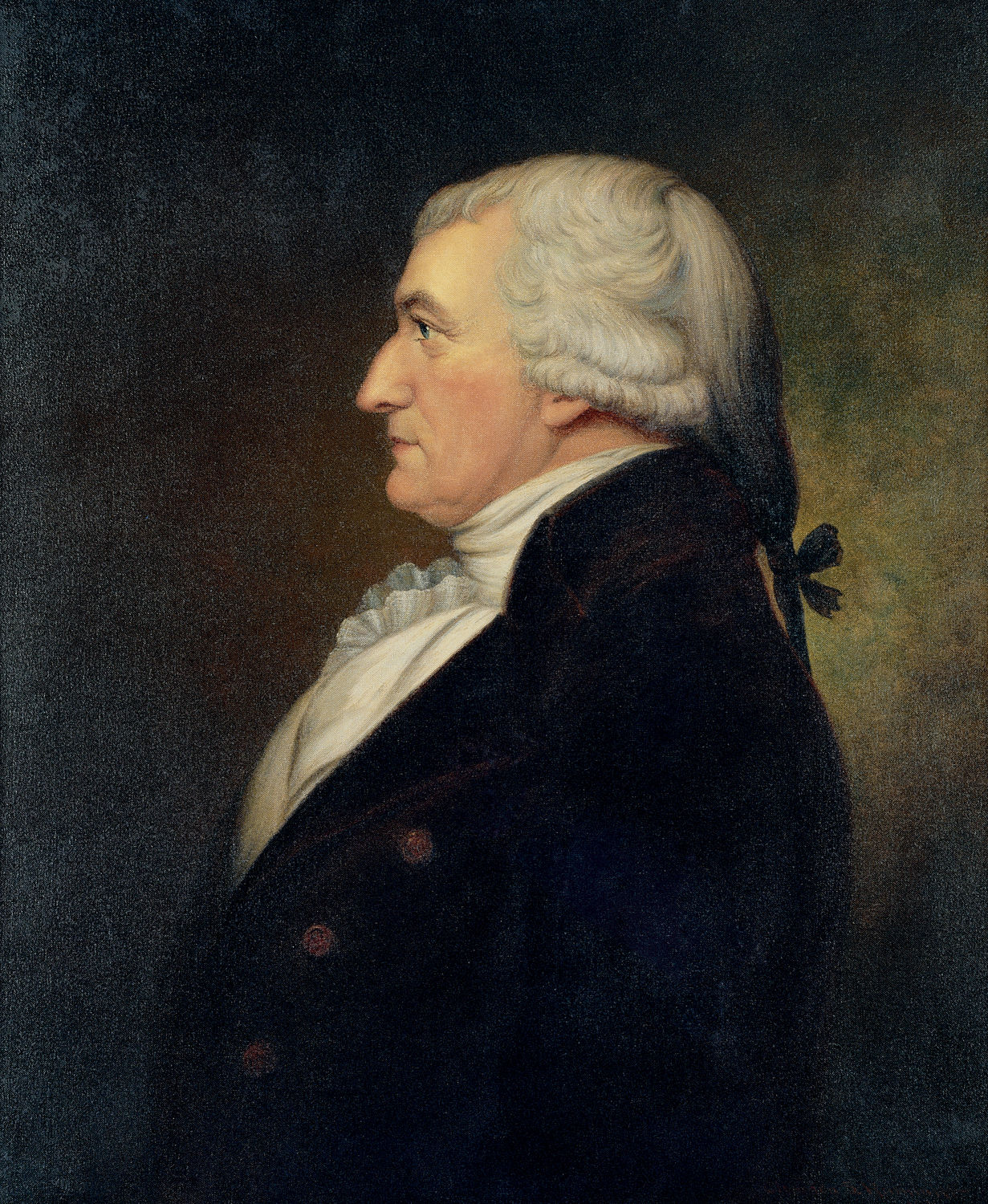

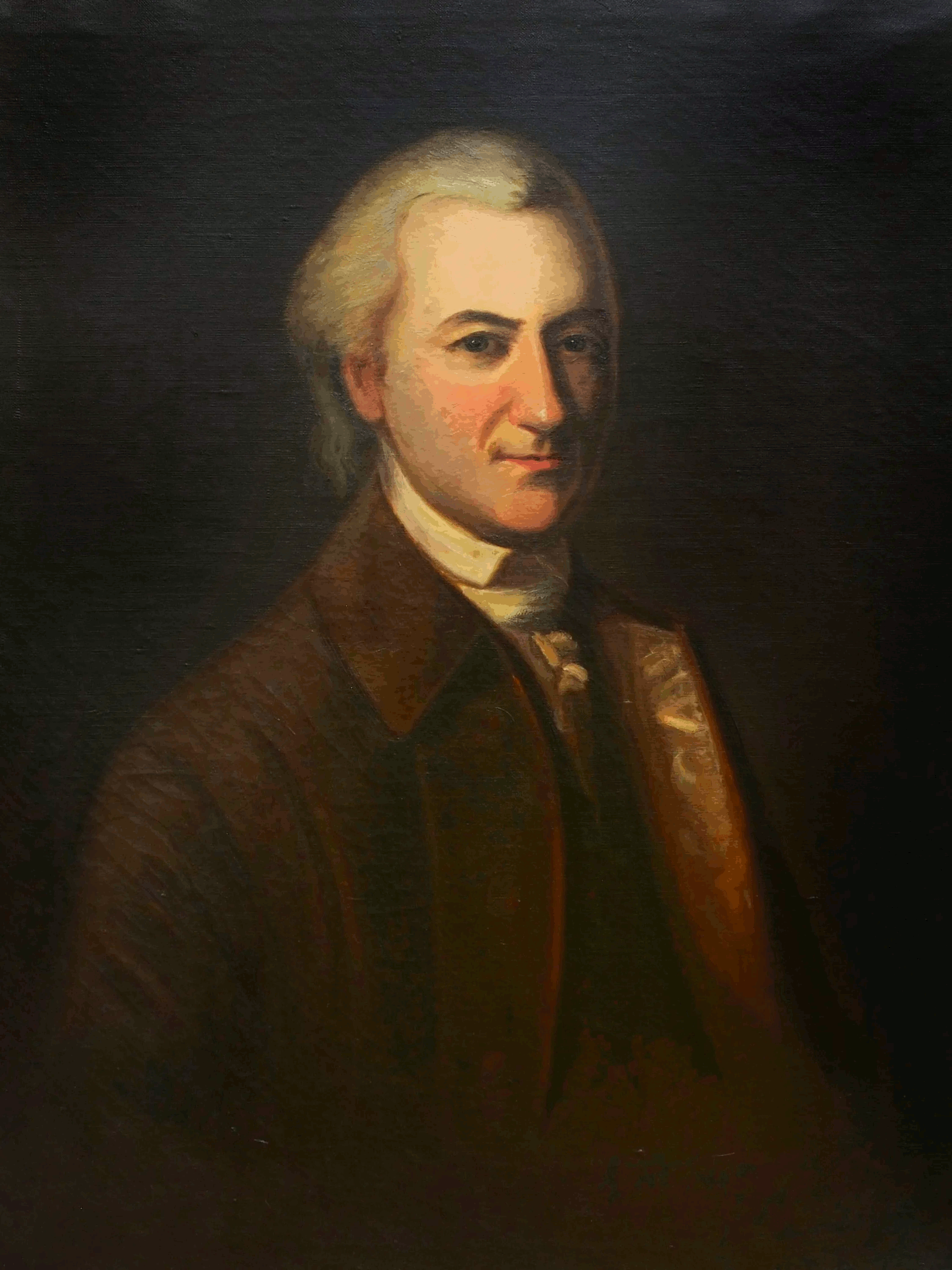
Nominee	Henry Latimer	John Dickinson
Party	Federalist	Democratic-Republican
Popular vote	15	14
Percentage	51.72%	48.28%
U.S. senator before election
George Read
Federalist
Elected U.S. Senator
Henry Latimer
Federalist

The Delaware special election was held February 7, 1795. Incumbent Senator George Read had resigned to take the position of Chief Justice of the Delaware Supreme Court. Henry Latimer defeated the former Governor of Delaware, Governor of Pennsylvania and Continental Congressmen from Delaware and Pennsylvania by one vote.

1795 United States Senate election in Delaware
Party	Candidate	Votes	%
Federalist	Henry Latimer	15	51.72%
Democratic-Republican	John Dickinson	14	48.28%
Total votes		29	100%

== Maryland ==
1795 United States Senate election in Maryland
- December 16, 1794

80 members of the Maryland General Assembly
Candidate	John Henry	James Lloyd
Party	Federalist	Democratic-Republican
Legislative vote	-
Percentage	-%	%

John Henry won election over James Lloyd by an unknown number of votes for the Class 3 seat.

== Pennsylvania ==
=== Pennsylvania (special) ===
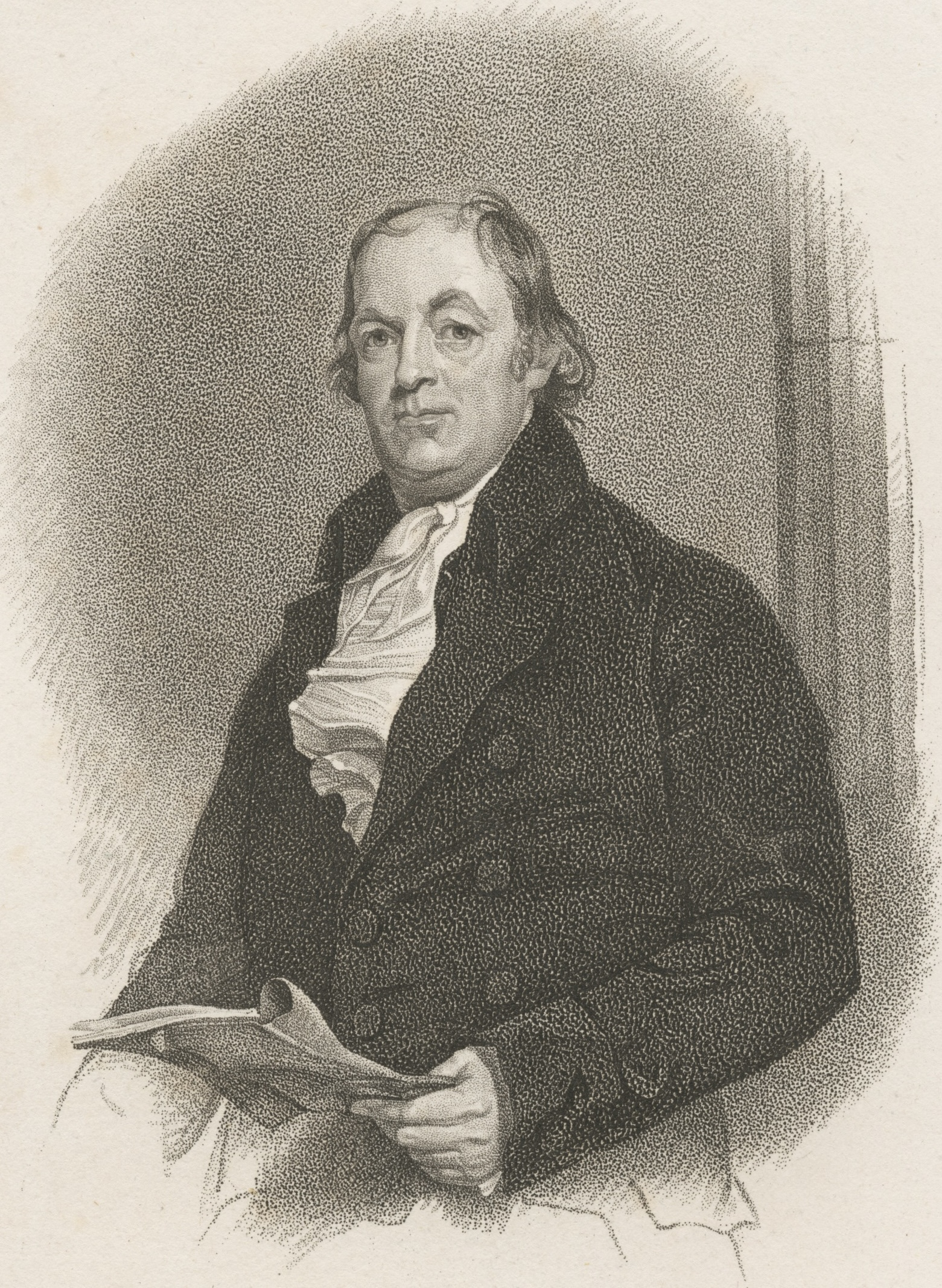
Senator James Ross

Pennsylvania special election, March 31, 1794
Party	Candidate	Votes	%
Pro-Administration	James Ross	45	51.72%
Unknown	Robert Coleman	35	40.23%
Federalist	Samuel Sitgreaves	1	1.15%
N/A	Not voting	6	6.70%
Total votes		87	100%

=== Pennsylvania (regular) ===
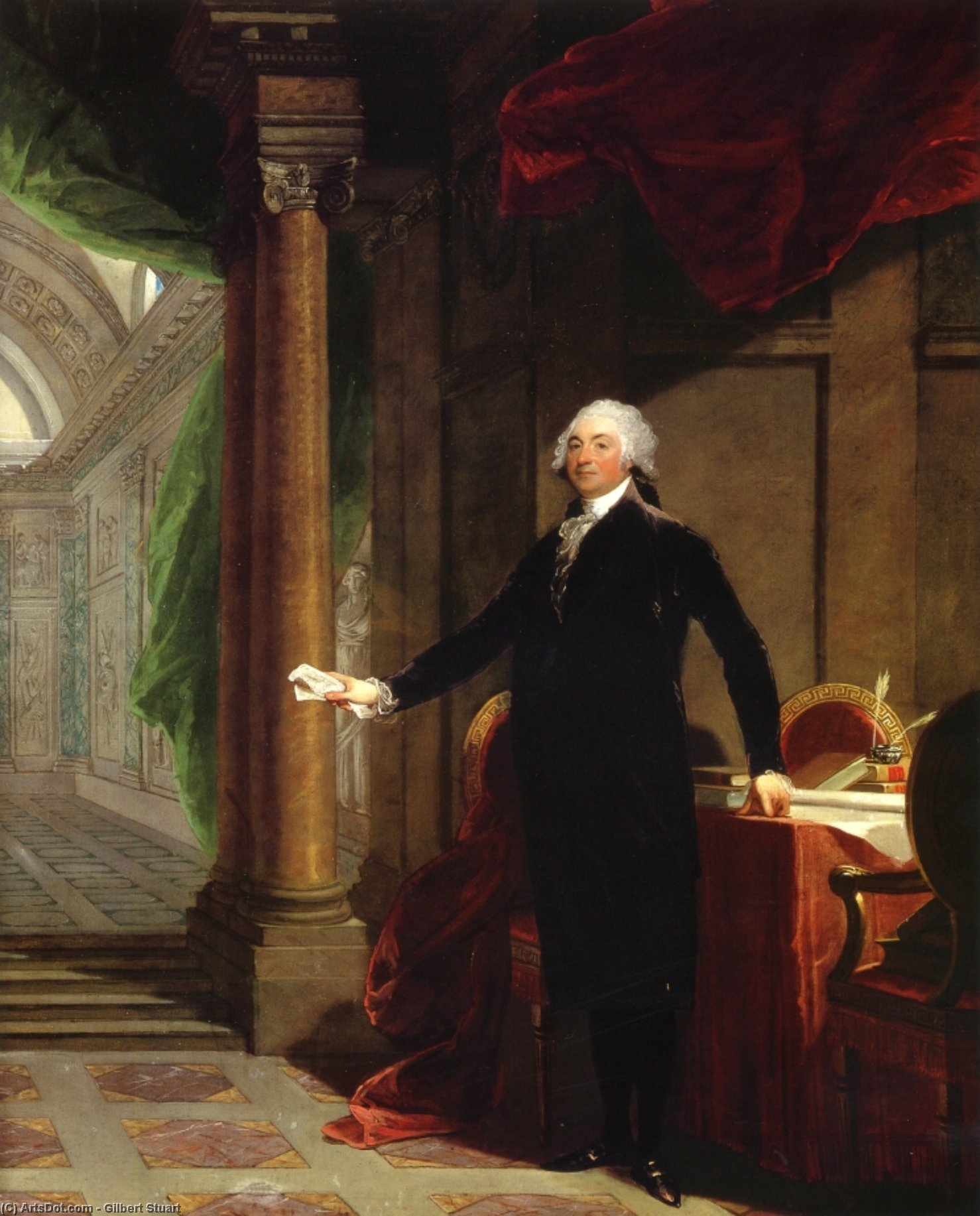
Senator William Bingham

Incumbent Federalist Robert Morris, who was elected in 1788, was not a candidate for re-election to another term. The Pennsylvania General Assembly convened on February 26, 1795, to elect a senator for the term beginning March 4, 1795.

Pennsylvania general election, February 26, 1795
Party	Candidate	Votes	%
Pro-Administration	William Bingham	58	56.86%
Anti-Administration	Peter Muhlenberg	35	34.31%
N/A	Not voting	9	8.82%
Total votes		102	100%

== Virginia ==
Even though neither of Virginia's incumbent's terms were up, both resigned in 1794, leading to two special elections.

Future-president James Monroe resigned March 27, 1794 to become U.S. Minister to France.

Stevens Thomson Mason was elected November 18, 1794 and would become a Democratic-Republican in the next Congress.

=== Virginia (special, class 2) ===
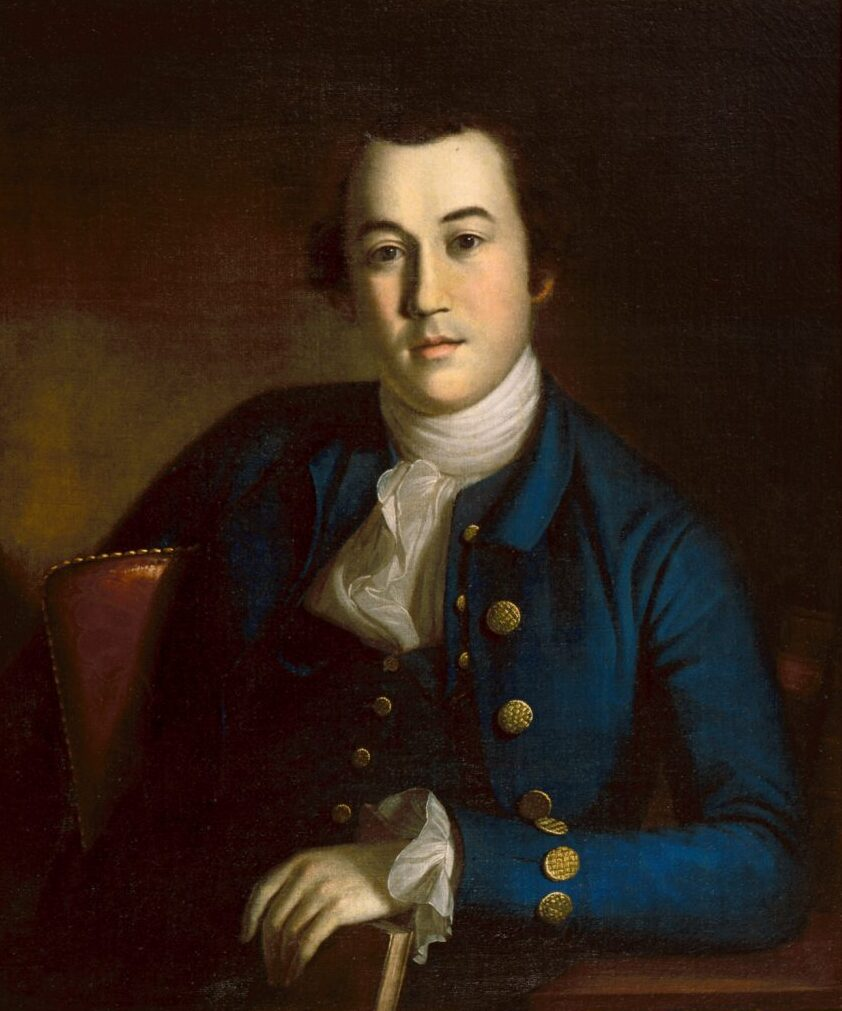
Senator Henry Tazewell

Incumbent John Taylor of Caroline resigned May 11, 1794.

Henry Tazewell was elected November 18, 1794 and would become a Democratic-Republican in the next Congress.

== See also ==
- 1794 United States elections
  - 1794–95 United States House of Representatives elections
- 3rd United States Congress
- 4th United States Congress
