= 1795 United States Senate special election in Delaware =

- March 16, 1795
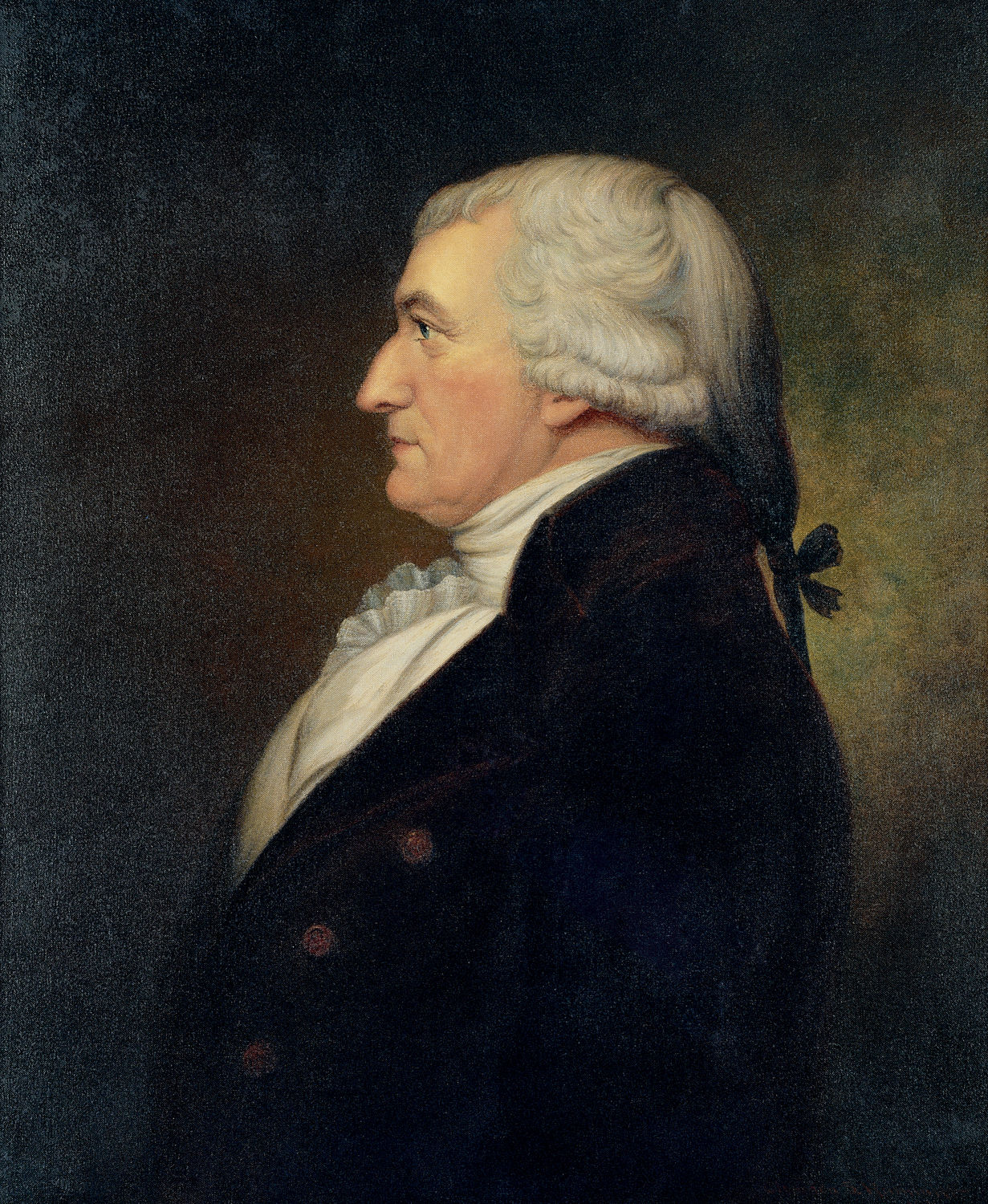

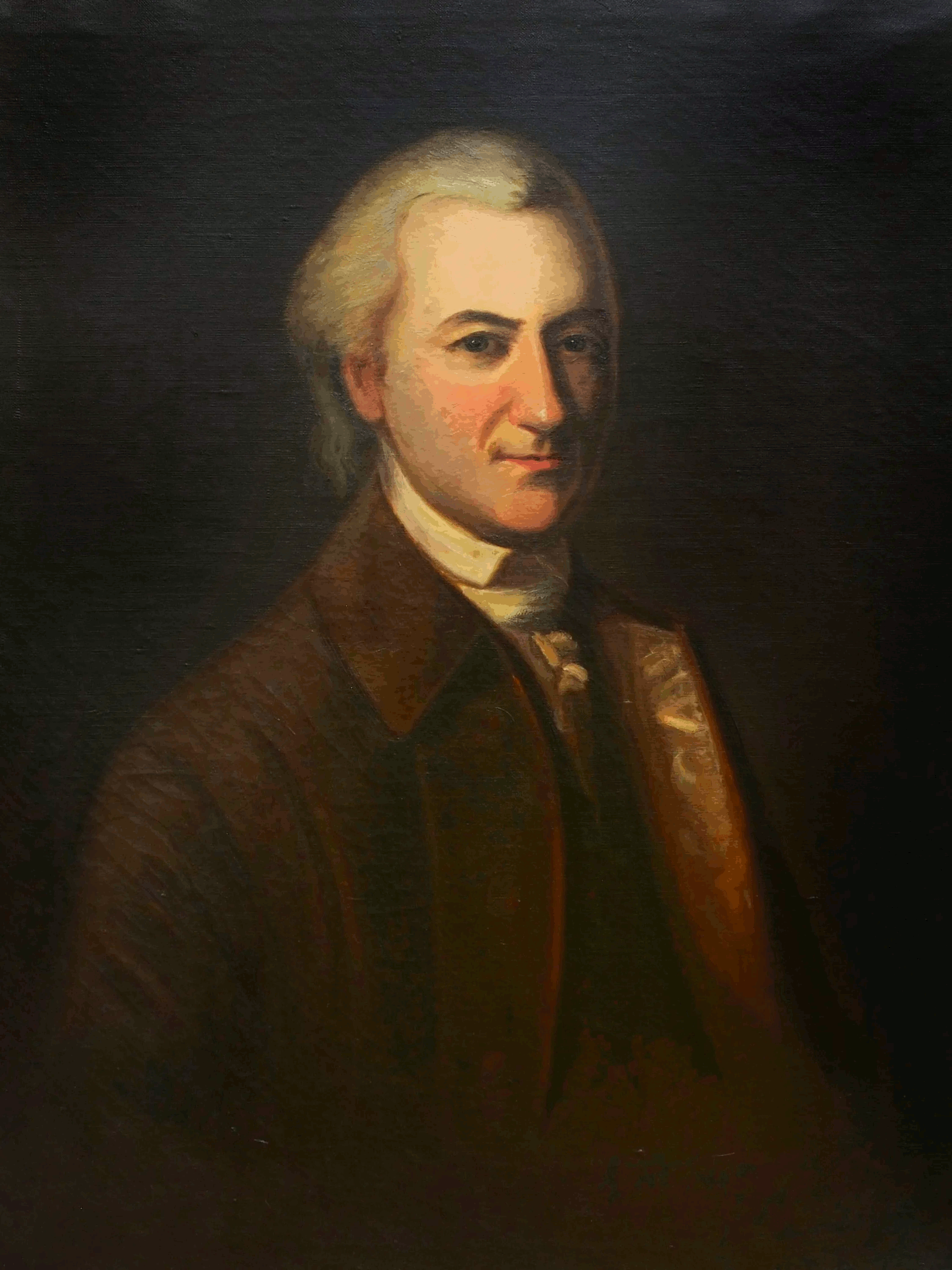
Nominee	Henry Latimer	John Dickinson
Party	Federalist	Democratic-Republican
Popular vote	15	14
Percentage	51.72%	48.28%
U.S. senator before election
George Read
Federalist
Elected U.S. Senator
Henry Latimer
Federalist

The 1795 United States Senate special election in Delaware was held on March 16, 1795. Former Senator George Read had resigned to take the position of Chief Justice of the Delaware Supreme Court. Henry Latimer defeated the former governor of Delaware, governor of Pennsylvania and Continental Congressman John Dickinson from Delaware and Pennsylvania by one vote.

== Results ==
1795 United States Senate special election in Delaware
Party	Candidate	Votes	%
Federalist	Henry Latimer	15	51.72%
Democratic-Republican	John Dickinson	14	48.28%
Total votes		29	100%

== See also ==
- 1794–95 United States Senate elections
