= Gifford Dalley =

American politician

Gifford Dalley was a United States House of Representatives officer from 1789 to 1795. He served as the House Doorkeeper for the First, Second, and Third United States Congresses. At various times, Dalley's last name appeared in official records as "Dalley," "Dally," or "Dudley."

Gifford Dalley was the son of Henry Dalley of Middlesex, New Jersey and Sarah Gifford daughter of John Gifford of Perth Amboy, New Jersey, who was bound to Lewis Morris (governor). Sarah Gifford and Henry Dalley received a license for marriage on November 9, 1739. Gifford Dalley had two sisters in the Tavern business. His sister Elizabeth Dalley was married to Samuel Fraunces. His sister Catherine Dalley married William Slater and next married John Simmons. Gifford Dalley, Samuel Fraunces and John Simmons are all Tavern owners of record. Another sister, Mary Dalley, is listed in 1790 as living at 107 Market St. Philadelphia where she operated an important boarding houses for many years. Mary was also an enterprising business woman who sold tea in addition working as a tailor. His sister Sarah married Walter Broock (Ten Brock) at Trinity Church, NYC in 1756. There was also a brother Joseph Dalley.

Gifford Dalley married Anna Pettit in New York on July 4, 1767.

Dalley was manager at City Tavern, Philadelphia, PA. Dalley later leased the London Coffee House, Philadelphia.
