= William Loughton Smith =

American politician

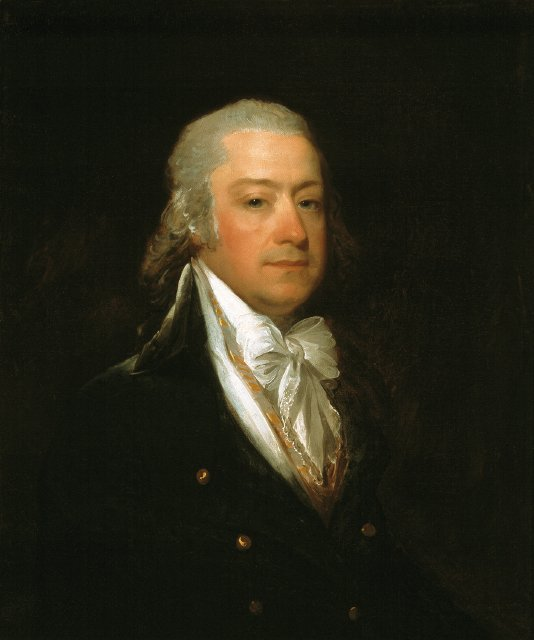
- Portrait by Gilbert Stuart, c. 1795

United States Minister to Portugal
- In office September 8, 1797 – September 9, 1801
- President: John Adams; Thomas Jefferson
- Preceded by: David Humphreys
- Succeeded by: Thomas Sumter Jr.

Chair of the House Ways and Means Committee
- In office 1794–1797
- Preceded by: Thomas Fitzsimons
- Succeeded by: Robert G. Harper

Member of the U.S. House of Representatives from South Carolina's 1st district
- In office April 13, 1789 – July 10, 1797
- Preceded by: Constituency established
- Succeeded by: Thomas Pinckney

Member of the South Carolina House of Representatives from Charles Town (St. James, Goose Creek)
- In office January 3, 1785 – May 22, 1789

Personal details
- Born: William Loughton Smith; October 2, 1758 Charles Town, Province of South Carolina, British America
- Died: December 19, 1812 (aged 54) Charleston, South Carolina, U.S.
- Party: Federalist
- Spouses: Charlotte Izard (m. 1758; died 1792) Charlotte Wragg (m. 1805)
- Children: 4 (2 per marriage)
- Parent(s): Benjamin Smith; Anne Loughton
- Relatives: Ralph Izard (father-in-law, first marriage)
- Education: Middle Temple
- Occupation: politician

William Loughton Smith (1758 – December 19, 1812) was an American lawyer, politician, and diplomat from Charleston, South Carolina. He represented South Carolina as a Federalist in the United States House of Representatives from 1789 until 1797, during which time he served as chairman of the Committee on Ways and Means.

== Early life and legal career ==
Coat of Arms of William Loughton Smith

Smith was born in Charles Town in the Province of South Carolina in 1758 to Benjamin Smith and Anne Loughton. His father earned his fortune as an importer of British luxury goods (primarily furniture and high-end silverware) into Charleston. His father's considerable wealth allowed him to sit out the Revolutionary War while obtaining his education in Europe.

In 1774, Smith studied law at the Middle Temple in London, Great Britain and continued his studies in Geneva from 1774 to 1778. Smith remained in Europe for the remainder of the American Revolutionary War.

In 1783, Smith returned to South Carolina. He was admitted to the bar in 1784 and began practicing law in Charleston and he quickly became locally famous as the most able lawyer in Charleston.

== Political career ==
In 1784, Smith served as a member of the South Carolina privy council. In 1786, Smith was elected warden of the city of Charleston in 1786, equivalent to a city council member today. From 1787 to 1788, Smith served in the South Carolina House of Representatives.

Smith was known for being outspokenly pro-George Washington and was elected as a Pro-Administration candidate to the First Congress in 1788 to South Carolina's 1st congressional district. His election was contested by his opponent David Ramsey, who claimed that, because Smith had only returned to the newly founded United States in 1783, he had not been a U.S. citizen for seven years, a constitutional requirement for election to the House. This was the first invocation of Congress's power, established under Article I, Section 5 of the Constitution, to serve as the "Judge of the Elections, Returns and Qualifications of its own Members"; the House found that Smith was qualified, with James Madison noting that "it is an established maxim, that birth is the criterion of allegiance." During the Washington administration, Smith accompanied Washington on tours of Rhode Island and the Southern states.

Smith was subsequently reelected to the Second Congress and Third Congress. Smith later joined the Federalist Party and was reelected to the Fourth and Fifth Congress under that ticket. In the Third Congress, Smith served as chair of the Committee on Elections. In the Fourth and Fifth Congresses, Smith served as chair of the Committee on Ways and Means.

As chair of the Committee on Ways and Means, Smith acted as a Federalist floor leader and was known as a close collaborator and House spokesman for Treasury Secretary Alexander Hamilton.

On July 10, 1797, Smith resigned from Congress to serve as United States Ambassador to Portugal. He held the position until September 9, 1801, when he was recalled and took a leave of absence. Smith returned to Charleston and ran for Congress again in 1804, 1806, and 1808, but lost all of those elections to the Democratic-Republican Party candidate Robert Marion.

In 1808, Smith was commissioned as a lieutenant in the South Carolina Militia. That same year, Smith was elected to the South Carolina House of Representatives.

== Later life and death ==
Following his career in politics, Smith served as president of the Santee Canal Company, vice president of the Charleston Library Society, and vice president of the St. Cecilia Society.

Smith died of an illness in Charleston, S.C., December 19, 1812. He was interred in St. Philip's Churchyard.

== Political views ==
In a special session of United States Congress called by John Adams in 1797, Smith introduced ten resolutions calling for increased naval defense and shore fortifications in response to the growing crisis in Franco-American relations.

Smith was opposed to the emancipation of slaves, believing it would benefit neither whites nor blacks. As he explained on the floor of the House of Representatives on March 17, 1790:

"If the blacks did not intermarry with the whites, they would remain black until the end of time; for it was not contended that liberating them would whitewash them; if they did intermarry with the whites, then the white race would be extinct, and the American people would all be of mulatto breed. In whatever light, therefore, the subject was viewed, the folly of emancipation was manifest."

In 1808, his politics shifted away from Alexander Hamilton and toward Thomas Jefferson, with Smith embracing the Embargo Act of 1807 as a way to increase the U.S.'s self-sufficiency.

U.S. House of Representatives
Preceded by Position established	Member of the U.S. House of Representatives from South Carolina's 1st congressional district 1789–1797	Succeeded by Thomas Pinckney
Diplomatic posts
Preceded by John Quincy Adams (1796)	United States Minister Plenipotentiary to Portugal; 1797–1801	Succeeded by Thomas Sumter, Jr. (1809)
