= James Lloyd (Maryland politician) =

American politician (1745–1830)

United States Senator from Maryland
- In office December 8, 1797 – December 1, 1800
- Preceded by: John Henry
- Succeeded by: William Hindman

Personal details
- Born: 1756 Chestertown, Maryland
- Died: September 20, 1830 (aged 73–74) Easton, Maryland
- Party: Federalist

James Lloyd (1756 – September 20, 1830) was an American politician.

Lloyd as born at Farley (now Fairlee) near Chestertown, Maryland. He pursued classical studies and studied law, was admitted to the bar, and commenced practice. He was commissioned second lieutenant in the Kent County militia in 1776 and served during the American Revolutionary War. He was a general in the War of 1812 and he freed captive Francis Scott Key from Fort McHenry.

Lloyd was elected as a Federalist to the United States Senate to fill the vacancy caused by the resignation of John Henry and served from December 8, 1797, until December 1, 1800, when he resigned. On June 27, 1798, Lloyd introduced the Sedition Act of 1798, a part of the Alien and Sedition Acts.

He engaged in the practice of law afterwards. James Lloyd died at Ratcliffe Manor, near Easton, Maryland on September 20, 1830. He was interred at Clover Fields, the estate of his daughter in Queen Anne's County, Maryland.

== See also ==
- United States Congress. "James Lloyd (id: L000377)". Biographical Directory of the United States Congress.

U.S. Senate
Preceded by John Henry	U.S. senator (Class 3) from Maryland; 1797–1800; Served alongside: John E. Howard	Succeeded by William Hindman
