= 1792 United States elections =

Elections for the 3rd U.S. Congress

- ← 1790 1791 1792 1793 1794 → Presidential election year
- Incumbent president: George Washington (Independent)
- Next Congress: 3rd

Presidential election
- Electoral vote
- George Washington: 132
- Presidential election results map. Tan denotes states won by Washington. Numbers indicate the number of electoral votes cast by each state.

Senate elections
- Overall control: Pro-Administration hold
- Seats contested: 10 of 30 seats
- Net seat change: Pro-Administration +1

House elections
- Overall control: Anti-Administration gain
- Seats contested: All 105 voting members
- Net seat change: Anti-Administration +24
- House of Representatives elections Pro-Administration (F) majority Anti-Administration (DR) majority Even split

Elections were held for the 3rd United States Congress, in 1792 and 1793. Congress was broadly divided between a Pro-Administration faction supporting the policies of the George Washington's administration and an Anti-Administration faction opposed to those policies. Due to this, the Federalist Party (generally overlapping with the Pro-Administration faction) and the Democratic-Republican Party (generally overlapping with the Anti-Administration faction) were starting to emerge as the distinct political parties of the First Party System. In this election, the Pro-Administration faction maintained control of the Senate, but lost its majority in the House.

== Events of the election ==
In the presidential election, incumbent President George Washington was re-elected without any major opposition. Washington had considered retirement, but was convinced to seek re-election for the purpose of national unity. Though Washington went unchallenged, Governor George Clinton of New York sought to unseat John Adams as vice president. However, Adams received the second most electoral votes, and so was re-elected to office. Washington remained unaffiliated with any political faction or party throughout his presidency.

In the House, 37 seats were added following the 1790 census. The Anti-Administration faction picked up several seats, narrowly taking the majority from the Pro-Administration faction. However, Frederick Muhlenberg, who leaned closer to the Pro-Administration faction, was elected Speaker of the House.

In the Senate, the Anti-Administration faction picked up one seat, but the Pro-Administration faction maintained a small majority.

== See also ==
- 1792 United States presidential election
- 1792–93 United States House of Representatives elections
- 1792–93 United States Senate elections
