= Joshua Seney =

American politician (1756–1798)

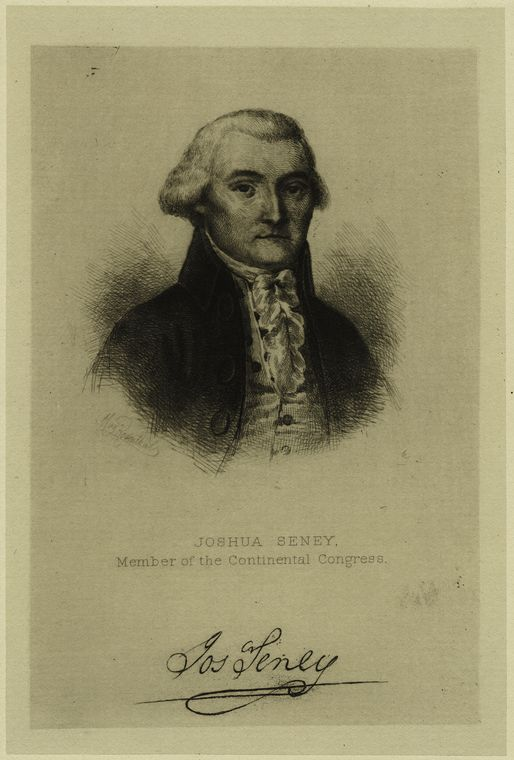

Member-elect of the U.S. House of Representatives from Maryland's 7th district
- Died before assuming office
- Preceded by: William Hindman
- Succeeded by: Joseph Hopper Nicholson

Member of the U.S. House of Representatives from Maryland's 2nd district
- In office March 4, 1789 – December 6, 1792
- Preceded by: Constituency established
- Succeeded by: William Hindman

Personal details
- Born: March 4, 1756 near Church Hill, Maryland, British America
- Died: October 20, 1798 (aged 42) near Church Hill, Maryland, U.S.
- Party: Anti-Administration (before 1792); Democratic-Republican (1792–1798)
- Spouse: Frances Nicholson
- Relatives: William Few (brother-in-law); Albert Gallatin (brother-in-law); John Montgomery (brother-in-law)
- Education: College of Philadelphia (BA)

Joshua Seney (March 4, 1756 – October 20, 1798) was an American farmer and lawyer from Queen Anne's County, Maryland. He represented the state of Maryland in the Continental Congress, and the second district of Maryland in the House of Representatives.

== Early life ==
Joshua was born to John Seney (1730–1795) and Ruth (née Benton) Seney in 1756 on the family farm near Church Hill in the Province of Maryland. His grandfather, Solomon, was a French Huguenot refugee who arrived in Maryland around 1727. By the time Joshua was born the family were prosperous farmers and planters. He was educated in local schools and then attended the College of Philadelphia (now the University of Pennsylvania), graduating in 1773.

== Career ==
After Seney was admitted to the bar, he confined himself to a private practice. In 1779, he served as the High Sheriff of Queen Anne's County, Maryland.

=== Continental Congress ===
During the early days of the Revolutionary War Seney busied himself with the care of the family's farms since his father was active as a Lt. Colonel in the militia. He was appointed the sheriff of Queen Anne's County in 1779. He was elected to the Maryland state House of Delegates, and served there from 1785 to 1787. In 1788, Seney was sent as a delegate to the Continental Congress.

=== United States Congress ===
After returning to his farm, Seney was again called to political service when he was elected to the First United States Congress in 1789. He was re-elected for the 1791–1793 term as an Anti-Administration candidate but resigned from Congress on December 6, 1792, to take up his new duties as a judge of the state court for the district of Baltimore. He served as Chief Justice of the Third Judicial District of Maryland from 1792 to 1796.

In 1798, Seney ran for Congress again as a Republican. He defeated the incumbent Federalist, William Hindman but died before taking office.

== Personal life ==
Seney was married to Frances "Fanny" Nicholson (1771–1851) of the prominent Nicholson family of Maryland. Fanny was the daughter of Commodore James Nicholson and was the sister of Catherine "Kitty" Nicholson (wife of William Few), Hannah Nicholson (wife of Albert Gallatin), James Witter Nicholson (husband of Ann Griffin, daughter of Isaac Griffin), Maria Nicholson (wife of John Montgomery), and Jehoiadden Nicholson (wife of James Chrystie). Together, Joshua and Fanny were the parents of:

- Joshua Seney Jr. (1793–1854), who married Ann Ebert (1803–1879), the parents of Judge Henry William Seney.

Seney died at home on October 20, 1798, and was buried in a family plot on his farm near Church Hill in Queen Anne's County. His grave can now be found in the churchyard of St. Luke's Church.

U.S. House of Representatives
New constituency	Member of the U.S. House of Representatives from Maryland's 2nd congressional district 1789—1792	Succeeded by William Hindman
Preceded by William Hindman	Member-elect of the U.S. House of Representatives from Maryland's 7th congressional district 1798	Succeeded by Joseph Hopper Nicholson
