= 1794 United States elections =

Elections for the 4th U.S. Congress

- ← 1792 1793 1794 1795 1796 → Midterm elections
- Incumbent president: George Washington (Independent)
- Next Congress: 4th

Senate elections
- Overall control: Federalist hold
- Seats contested: 10 of 30 seats
- Net seat change: Federalist +3

House elections
- Overall control: Democratic-Republican hold
- Seats contested: All 105 voting seats
- Net seat change: Democratic-Republican +5

Elections occurred in the middle of President George Washington's second term. Members of the 4th United States Congress were chosen in this election. Tennessee was admitted as a state during the 4th Congress. The election took place at the beginning of the First Party System, with the Democratic-Republican Party and the Federalist Party emerging as political parties, succeeding the anti-administration faction and the pro-administration faction.

In the House, the Democratic-Republicans picked up a small number of seats, increasing their majority. However, Federalist Jonathan Dayton was elected Speaker of the House, defeating Frederick Muhlenberg, who had a less clear partisan affiliation.

In the Senate, the Federalists picked up a moderate number of seats, increasing their majority.

Washington remained unaffiliated with any political faction or party throughout his presidency.

== See also ==
- 1794–95 United States House of Representatives elections
- 1794–95 United States Senate elections
