= Richard Potts =

American judge (1753-1808)

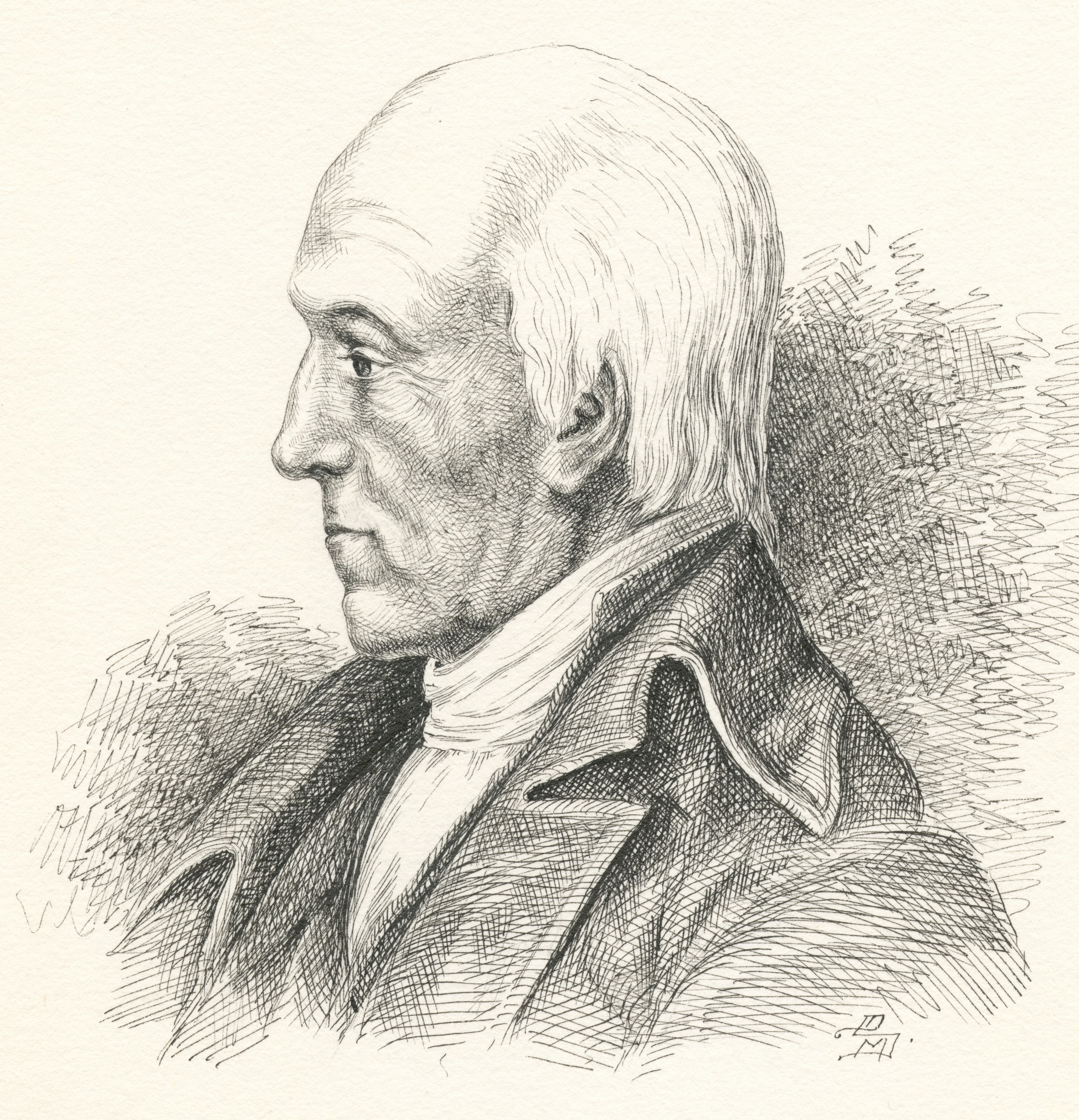

United States Senator from Maryland
- In office January 10, 1793 – October 24, 1796
- Preceded by: Charles Carroll
- Succeeded by: John E. Howard

United States Attorney for the District of Maryland
- In office 1789–1791
- Appointed by: George Washington
- Preceded by: Office established
- Succeeded by: Zebulon Hollingsworth

Personal details
- Born: July 19, 1753 Upper Marlboro, Maryland
- Died: November 26, 1808 (aged 55) Frederick, Maryland
- Resting place: Mount Olivet Cemetery
- Party: Pro-Administration

Richard Potts (July 19, 1753 – November 26, 1808) was an American politician and jurist.

== Early life and career ==
Potts was born in Upper Marlboro, Maryland, and lived there until he moved with his family to the Barbados Islands in 1757. He returned to Maryland and settled in the state capital of Annapolis in 1761, where he studied law. He commenced the practice of law in Frederick County, Maryland in 1775. Potts served as a member of the committee of observation for Frederick County in 1776 and as military aide to the Governor of Maryland in 1777.

== Law career ==
Potts served as clerk of the Frederick County court from 1777 to 1778, and as prosecuting attorney for Frederick, Montgomery, and Washington Counties in 1784. He was appointed by President George Washington as United States attorney for Maryland, and served from 1789 to 1791.

He was a delegate to the Maryland State Convention of 1788, to vote whether Maryland should ratify the proposed Constitution of the United States. Potts also served as a member of the Continental Congress in 1781, and as member of the Maryland convention which ratified the Constitution of the United States in 1788.

From 1791 to 1793 and again from 1796 to 1801, Potts served as chief judge of the fifth judicial circuit of the State. He was later appointed associate justice of the Maryland Court of Appeals, a position he served in from 1801 to 1804.

== Political career ==
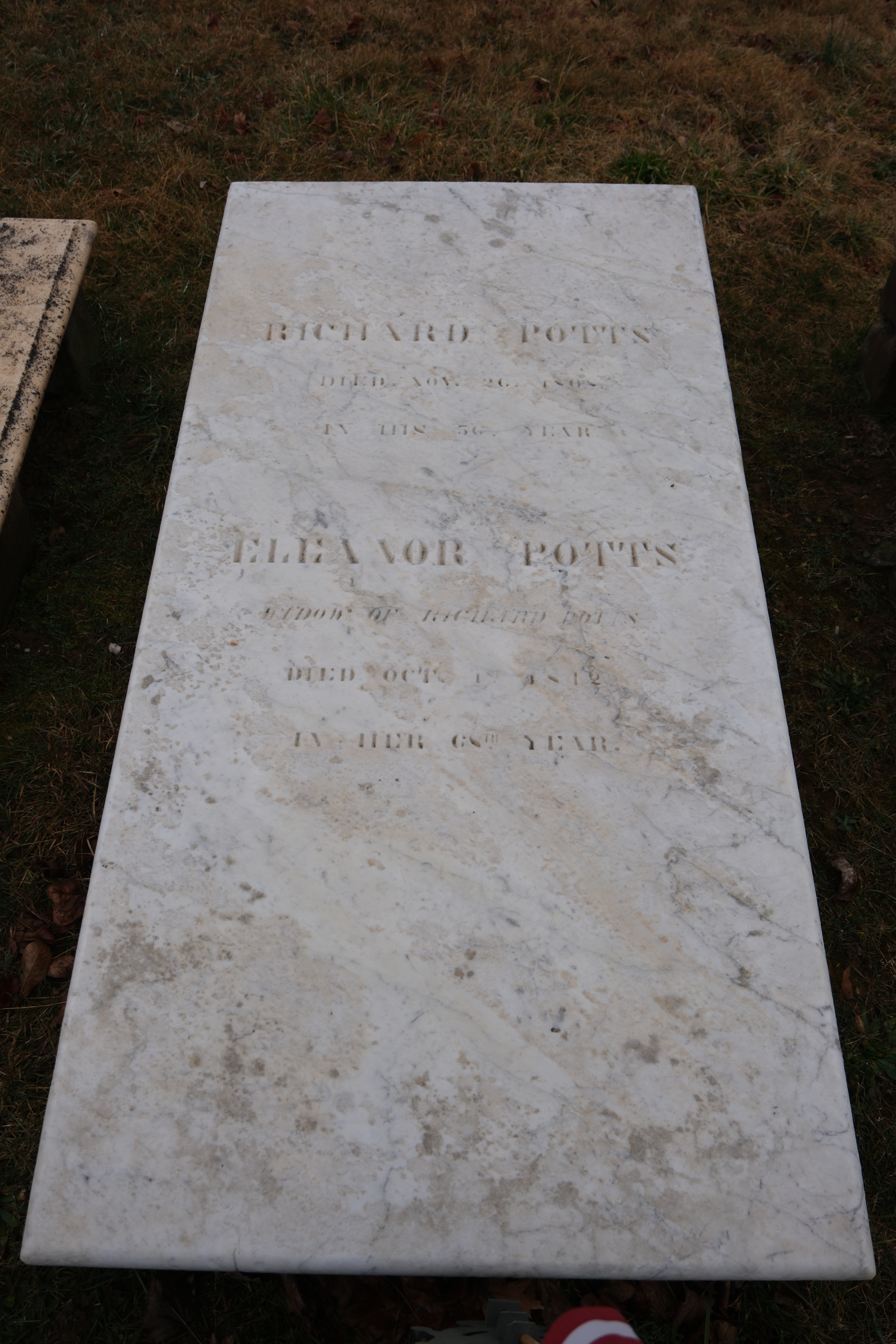
Grave of Potts and his wife at Mount Olivet Cemetery

Potts' political career included two terms in the Maryland House of Delegates from 1779 to 1780, and again from 1787 to 1788. He declined the nomination to be elected to the Maryland State Senate in 1787, but served as a presidential elector in 1792. He was elected to the United States Senate to fill the vacancy caused by the resignation of Charles Carroll of Carrollton and served from January 10, 1793, to October 24, 1796, when he also resigned. Potts declined an appointment as Secretary of State in 1795. Potts died in Frederick in 1808, and was interred in All Saints’ Parish Cemetery until his reinterment in Mount Olivet Cemetery in Frederick.

U.S. Senate
Preceded by Charles Carroll	U.S. senator (Class 1) from Maryland; 1793–1796; Served alongside: John Henry	Succeeded by John E. Howard
