= William Hindman =

American politician (1743–1822)

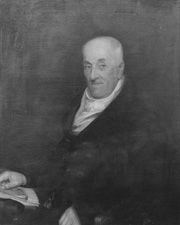

United States Senator from Maryland
- In office December 12, 1800 – November 19, 1801
- Preceded by: James Lloyd
- Succeeded by: Robert Wright

Member of the U.S. House of Representatives from Maryland's 7th district
- In office March 4, 1793 – March 3, 1799
- Preceded by: District created
- Succeeded by: Joshua Seney (Elect)

Member of the U.S. House of Representatives from Maryland's 2nd district
- In office January 30, 1793 – March 3, 1793
- Preceded by: Joshua Seney
- Succeeded by: John F. Mercer

Member of the Maryland House of Delegates
- In office 1799-1800

Personal details
- Born: April 1, 1743 Dorchester County, Province of Maryland, British America
- Died: January 19, 1822 (aged 78) Baltimore, Maryland, U.S.
- Party: Federalist
- Education: University of Pennsylvania

William Hindman (April 1, 1743 – January 19, 1822) was an American lawyer and statesman from Talbot County, Maryland. He represented Maryland in the Continental Congress, and in the federal Congress as both a Representative from the second and seventh districts, and as a U.S. Senator.

William was born in Dorchester County in the Province of Maryland, the second son of Jacob Hindman (1713–1766) and Mary Trippe Hindman (died 1782). Jacob was a plantation owner from Talbot county who served as sheriff of Talbot County from 1745 to 1748, and as a member of the colonial Assembly. William studied law at the Inns of Court in London, returning to Maryland in 1765. He was admitted to the bar, and practiced law in Talbot County.

From 1775 and 1777, Hindman served in Maryland's revolutionary government, as the state's Treasurer for the Eastern Shore. He resigned this post when he was elected to the state Senate in 1777. He was re-elected several times, and served until 1784. Maryland sent him as a delegate to the Continental Congress in 1785 and 1786.

Hindman returned to Maryland and served on the governor's executive council from 1789 to 1792. In 1792 voters returned him to the state Senate, but later that year he was elected to the United States House of Representatives after the resignation of Joshua Seney. He served in the Congress from 1793 to 1799, when he returned to his plantation, although he served in the state's House of Representatives in 1799 and 1800. In the U.S. House, he was one of nine representatives to vote against the Eleventh Amendment to the United States Constitution.

In 1800, Maryland's U.S. Senator James Lloyd resigned, and Hindman was named to finish his term. He served in the United States Senate from December 1800 until November 1801. In the Senate, he was aligned with the Federalists. He declined to run for re-election.

Hindman died in Baltimore, Maryland, and is buried in St. Paul's Burial Ground there.

== See also ==
- Annapolis Convention (1774–1776)

Political offices
| Preceded by No one | Treasurer of the Eastern Shore of Maryland; 1775–1777 | Succeeded by James Hindman |
U.S. House of Representatives
| Preceded by Joshua Seney | Member of the U.S. House of Representatives from Maryland's 2nd congressional district 1793 | Succeeded by John Francis Mercer |
| Preceded by New district | Member of the U.S. House of Representatives from Maryland's 7th congressional district 1793–1799 | Succeeded by Joshua Seney; Elect |
U.S. Senate
| Preceded by James Lloyd | U.S. senator (Class 3) from Maryland; 1800–1801; Served alongside: John E. Howard | Succeeded by Robert Wright |
