= John Henry (Maryland politician) =

American politician (1750–1798)

8th Governor of Maryland
- In office November 17, 1797 – November 14, 1798
- Preceded by: John H. Stone
- Succeeded by: Benjamin Ogle
- In office March 4, 1789 – December 10, 1797
- Preceded by: Position established
- Succeeded by: James Lloyd

Personal details
- Born: November 1750 Dorchester County, Province of Maryland, British America
- Died: December 16, 1798 (aged 48) Dorchester County, U.S.
- Party: Federalist Party; Democratic-Republican
- Spouse: Margaret Campbell (m. 1787; died 1789)
- Children: John Campbell Henry; Francis Jenkins Henry
- Education: College of New Jersey

John Henry (November 1750 – December 16, 1798) was the eighth governor of Maryland and member of the United States Senate. He was born at his family's estate (Weston), located near Vienna in Dorchester County.

== Early life ==
John Henry was born in November 1750. He was the son of Dorothy Rider and Col. John Henry and the grandson of Rev. John Henry, a Presbyterian minister who came to America in the early 1700s. His grandmother, Mary King, has been claimed without proof to be the daughter of an Irish baronet. His mother was a descendant of one of the early settlers of Dorchester County.

Henry attended West Nottingham Academy in Cecil County, Maryland and graduated from the College of New Jersey (later Princeton University) in 1769; he then studied law at the Middle Temple (one of the Inns of Court where English barristers are trained) in London. He returned to the United States in 1775 and practiced law in Dorchester County.

== Career ==
He was a member of the Episcopal Church and the United States Democratic-Republican Party. Originally, he was a member of the Federalist Party.

Henry served as a member of Maryland House of Delegates from 1777 to 1780 and a member of the Maryland State Senate from 1780 to 1790. During that time he was chosen as a delegate to the Continental Congress from Maryland from 1778 to 1780 and from 1785 to 1786; during his service, he was a member of the committee that prepared the ordinance for the government of the Northwest Territory. He was elected as an inaugural Senator from Maryland, serving 1789 as a Federalist till his resignation on December 10, 1797, to assume the Governorship.

In the 1796 election, Henry received two electoral votes for President of the United States. He served as Governor of Maryland from 1797 to 1798. In this capacity, he exchanged letters with then Vice-President, Thomas Jefferson.

== Personal life ==
On March 6, 1787, Henry was married to Margaret Campbell (1769–1789), the daughter of John and Elizabeth (née Goldsborough) Campbell of Caroline County. Her sister married Philip Francis and was the grandmother of Gov. Philip Francis Thomas. Margaret died, aged 20, shortly after the birth of their second son. Their two sons were:

- John Campbell Henry (1787–1857), who married Mary Nevett Steele (1789–1873), the daughter of James Steele (1760–1816) and a sister of U.S. Rep. John Nevett Steele and Isaac Nevett Steele, a Baltimore lawyer.
- Francis Jenkins Henry (b. 1789), who died unmarried soon after becoming of age.

He died in Dorchester County, at Weston, the same estate where he had been born. Henry is buried in Christ Episcopal Church Cemetery in Cambridge.

=== Descendants ===
Henry was a grandfather to John and Mary's eight children, John Francis Henry (1813–1847), Dr. James Winfield Henry (1815–1889), Francis Jenkins Henry (1816–1902), Catherine Henry Lloyd (1818–1886), Daniel Maynadier Henry (1823–1899), Isabella Elizabeth Henry Steele (1825–1912), Mary Henry Goldsborough (1828–1911), Rider Henry (1828–1900), and Charlotte Augusta Page Henry Goldsborough (1834–1908).

U.S. Senate
Preceded by Position established	U.S. senator (Class 3) from Maryland; 1789–1797; Served alongside: Charles Carroll, Richard Potts, John E. Howard	Succeeded by James Lloyd
Political offices
Preceded by John Hoskins Stone	Governor of Maryland; 1797–1798	Succeeded by Benjamin Ogle
