= List of United States representatives in the 4th Congress =

This is a complete list of United States representatives during the 4th United States Congress listed by seniority. For the most part, representatives are ranked by the beginning of their terms in office.

As an historical article, the districts and party affiliations listed reflect those during the 4th Congress (March 4, 1795 – March 3, 1797). Seats and party affiliations on similar lists for other congresses will be different for certain members.

This article describes the criteria for seniority in the House of Representatives and sets out the list of members by seniority. It is prepared on the basis of the interpretation of seniority applied to the House of Representatives in the current congress. In the absence of information to the contrary, it is presumed that the twenty-first-century practice is identical to the seniority customs used during the 4th Congress.

== House seniority ==
Seniority in the House, for representatives with unbroken service, depends on the date on which the members first term began. That date is either the start of the Congress (4 March in odd numbered years, for the era up to and including the 73rd Congress starting in 1933) or the date of a special election during the Congress. Since many members start serving on the same day as others, ranking between them is based on alphabetical order by the last name of the representative.

Representatives in early congresses were often elected after the legal start of the Congress. Representatives are attributed with unbroken seniority, from the legal start of the congressional term, if they were the first person elected to a seat in a Congress. The date of the election is indicated in a note.

The seniority date is normally taken from the members entry in the Biographical Directory of the United States Congress, except where the date given is the legal start of the Congress and the actual election (for someone who was not the first person elected to the seat in that Congress) was later. The date of election is taken from United States Congressional Elections 1788-1997. In a few instances the latter work provides dates, for the start and end of terms, which correct those in the Biographical Directory.

The Biographical Directory normally uses the date of a special election, as the seniority date. However, mostly in early congresses, the date of the member taking his seat can be the one given. The date of the special election is mentioned in a note to the list below, when that date is not used as the seniority date by the Biographical Directory.

Representatives who returned to the House, after having previously served, are credited with service equal to one less than the total number of terms they served. When a representative has served a prior term of less than two terms (i.e., prior term minus one equals less than one), he is ranked above all others whose service begins on the same day.

== Leadership ==
In this Congress the only formal leader was the speaker of the House. A speakership ballot was held on December 7, 1795, and Jonathan Dayton (F-NJ) was elected.

== Standing committees ==
The House created its first standing committee, on April 13, 1789. There were four standing committees in the 4th Congress. In addition there was a Ways and Means Committee. Although the Ways and Means Committee was not formally added to the main list of standing committees until 1802, the 2011 committee considers it to be a forerunner.

Committees, in this period, were appointed for a session at a time and not necessarily for every one in a Congress. The speaker appointed the members.

This list refers to the standing committees of the House in the 4th Congress, the year of establishment as a standing committee, the number of members assigned to the committee and the dates of appointment in each session, the end of the session and its chairman. Chairmen, who were re-appointed after serving in the previous Congress, are indicated by an *.

No.	Committee	From	Members	Appointed	Chairman
1	Claims	1794	7	December 10, 1795 – June 1, 1796	*Uriah Tracy (F-CT)
1	Claims	1794	7	December 8, 1796 – March 3, 1797	Dwight Foster (F-MA)
2	Commerce and Manufactures	1795	7	December 14, 1795 – June 1, 1796	Benjamin Goodhue (F-MA)
2	Commerce and Manufactures	1795	7	December 9, 1796 – March 3, 1797	John Swanwick (DR-PA)
3	Elections	1789	7	December 7, 1795 – June 1, 1796	Abraham B. Venable (DR-VA)
3	Elections	1789	7	December 6, 1796 – March 3, 1797	Abraham B. Venable (DR-VA)
4	Revisal and Unfinished Business	1795	3	December 9, 1795 – June 1, 1796	Nicholas Gilman (F-NH)
4	Revisal and Unfinished Business	1795	3	December 6, 1796 – March 3, 1797	Nicholas Gilman (F-NH)
5	Ways and Means	[1794]	14	December 21, 1795-June 1, 1796	*William L. Smith (F-SC)
5	Ways and Means	[1794]	16	December 16, 1796 – March 3, 1797	*William L. Smith (F-SC)

== List of representatives by seniority ==
A numerical rank is assigned to each of the 105 members initially elected to the 4th Congress. Other members, who were not the first person elected to a seat but who joined the House during the Congress, are not assigned a number (apart from the member from a new state numbered 106).

Two representatives-elect were not sworn in, as they respectively declined to serve and resigned (probably before the start of this Congress). The list below includes the representatives-elect (with name in italics), with the seniority they would have held if they had been sworn in.

Party designations used in this article are D-R for Democratic-Republican members and F for Federalist representatives. Designations used for service in the first three congresses are A for Anti-Administration members and P for Pro-Administration representatives.

U.S. House seniority
Rank	Representative	Party	District	Seniority date	Notes
Four consecutive terms
1	Fisher Ames	F	MA-8	March 4, 1789	(P) 1789–95. Last term while serving as a member of the House.
2	Abraham Baldwin	DR	GA-al	March 4, 1789	(A) 1789–95
3	Nicholas Gilman	F	NH-al	March 4, 1789	(P) 1789–95. Chairman: Revisal and Unfinished Business. Last term while serving as a member of the House.
4	Benjamin Goodhue	F	MA-10	March 4, 1789	(P) 1789–95. Chairman: Commerce and Manufactures. Resigned, to become US Senator: June 1796.
5	Thomas Hartley	F	PA-8	March 4, 1789	(P) 1789–95
6	Daniel Hiester	DR	PA-5	March 4, 1789	(A) 1789–95. Resigned on July 1, 1796, while still serving as a member of the House.
7	James Madison	DR	VA-15	March 4, 1789	(A) 1789–95. Elected to this Congress: March 16, 1795. Last term while serving as a member of the House.
8	Andrew Moore	DR	VA-2	March 4, 1789	(A) 1789–95. Elected to this Congress: March 16, 1795. Last term while serving as a member of the House until 8th Congress.
9	Frederick Muhlenberg	DR	PA-2	March 4, 1789	(P) 1789–91; (A) 1791–95. Last term while serving as a member of the House.
10	John Page	DR	VA-12	March 4, 1789	(A) 1789–95. Elected to this Congress: March 16, 1795. Last term while serving as a member of the House.
11	Josiah Parker	F	VA-11	March 4, 1789	(A) 1789–93; (P) 1793–95. Elected to this Congress: March 16, 1795.
12	Theodore Sedgwick	F	MA-1	March 4, 1789	(P) 1789–95. Resigned, to become US Senator: June 1796. Last term while serving as a member of the House until 6th Congress.
13	William L. Smith	F	SC-1	March 4, 1789	(P) 1789–95. Chairman: Ways and Means.
14	George Thatcher	F	MA-14	March 4, 1789	(P) 1789–95
15	Jonathan Trumbull, Jr.	F	CT-al	March 4, 1789	(P) 1789–95. Resigned, as Representative-elect: c. February 1795.
16	William B. Giles	DR	VA-9	December 7, 1790	(A) December 7, 1790–95. Elected to this Congress: March 16, 1795.
17	Benjamin Bourne	F	RI-al	December 17, 1790	(P) December 17, 1790–95. Resigned 1796 while still serving as a member of the House.
Three consecutive terms
18	Jonathan Dayton	F	NJ-al	March 4, 1791	(P) 1791–95. Speaker of the House.
19	William Findley	DR	PA-11	March 4, 1791	(A) 1791–95
20	Andrew Gregg	DR	PA-9	March 4, 1791	(A) 1791–95
21	William B. Grove	F	NC-7	March 4, 1791	(P) 1791–95
22	James Hillhouse	F	CT-al	March 4, 1791	(P) 1791–95. Resigned, to become United States Senator: July 1, 1796.
23	John W. Kittera	F	PA-7	March 4, 1791	(P) 1791–95
24	Nathaniel Macon	DR	NC-5	March 4, 1791	(A) 1791–95
25	William V. Murray	F	MD-8	March 4, 1791	(P) 1791–95. Last term while serving as a member of the House.
26	Jeremiah Smith	F	NH-al	March 4, 1791	(P) 1791–95
27	Abraham B. Venable	DR	VA-7	March 4, 1791	(A) 1791–95. Elected to this Congress: March 16, 1795. Chairman: Elections.
28	Israel Smith	DR	VT-1	October 17, 1791	(A) October 17, 1791–95. Last term while serving as a member of the House until 7th Congress.
29	Alexander D. Orr	DR	KY-2	November 8, 1792	(A) November 8, 1792–95. Elected to this Congress: September 5, 1795. Last term while serving as a member of the House.
30	Christopher Greenup	DR	KY-1	November 9, 1792	(A) November 9, 1792–95. Elected to this Congress: September 5, 1795. Last term while serving as a member of the House.
31	William Hindman	F	MD-7	January 30, 1793	(P) January 30, 1793–95
Three non-consecutive terms
32	Isaac Coles	DR	VA-6	March 4, 1793	Previously served (A) 1789-91 while as a member of the House (A) 1793–95. Elected to this Congress: March 16, 1795. Last term while serving as a member of the House.
33	George Leonard	F	MA-7	March 4, 1795	Previously served (P) 1789-93 while as a member of the House. Elected to this Congress: June 1, 1795. Last term while serving as a member of the House.
Two consecutive terms
34	Theodorus Bailey	DR	NY-5	March 4, 1793	(A) 1793–95. Last term while serving as a member of the House until 6th Congress.
35	Lemuel Benton	DR	SC-3	March 4, 1793	(A) 1793–95
36	Thomas Blount	DR	NC-9	March 4, 1793	(A) 1793–95
37	Gabriel Christie	DR	MD-6	March 4, 1793	(A) 1793–95. Last term while serving as a member of the House until 6th Congress.
38	Thomas Claiborne	DR	VA-8	March 4, 1793	(A) 1793–95. Elected to this Congress: March 16, 1795.
39	Henry Dearborn	DR	MA-12	March 4, 1793	(A) 1793–95. Last term while serving as a member of the House.
40	George Dent	F	MD-1	March 4, 1793	(P) 1793–95
41	Dwight Foster	F	MA-4	March 4, 1793	(P) 1793–95. Chairman: Claims (1796).
42	Ezekiel Gilbert	F	NY-6	March 4, 1793	(P) 1793–95. Last term while serving as a member of the House.
43	James Gillespie	DR	NC-6	March 4, 1793	(A) 1793–95
44	Henry Glen	F	NY-8	March 4, 1793	(P) 1793–95
45	George Hancock	F	VA-5	March 4, 1793	(P) 1793–95. Elected to this Congress: March 16, 1795. Last term while serving as a member of the House.
46	Carter B. Harrison	DR	VA-10	March 4, 1793	(A) 1793–95. Elected to this Congress: March 16, 1795.
47	John Heath	DR	VA-19	March 4, 1793	(A) 1793–95. Elected to this Congress: March 16, 1795. Last term while serving as a member of the House.
48	Matthew Locke	DR	NC-2	March 4, 1793	(A) 1793–95
49	William Lyman	DR	MA-2	March 4, 1793	(A) 1793–95. Last term while serving as a member of the House.
50	Francis Malbone	F	RI-al	March 4, 1793	(P) 1793–95. Last term while serving as a member of the House.
51	Anthony New	DR	VA-16	March 4, 1793	(A) 1793–95. Elected to this Congress: March 16, 1795.
52	John Nicholas	DR	VA-18	March 4, 1793	(A) 1793–95. Elected to this Congress: March 16, 1795.
53	Francis Preston	DR	VA-4	March 4, 1793	(A) 1793–95. Elected to this Congress: March 16, 1795. Last term while serving as a member of the House.
54	Robert Rutherford	DR	VA-1	March 4, 1793	(A) 1793–95. Elected to this Congress: March 16, 1795. Last term while serving as a member of the House.
55	John S. Sherburne	DR	NH-al	March 4, 1793	(A) 1793–95. Last term while serving as a member of the House.
56	Samuel Smith	DR	MD-5	March 4, 1793	(A) 1793–95
57	Thomas Sprigg	DR	MD-4	March 4, 1793	(A) 1793–95. Last term while serving as a member of the House.
58	John E. Van Alen	F	NY-7	March 4, 1793	(P) 1793–95
59	Philip Van Cortlandt	DR	NY-3	March 4, 1793	(A) 1793–95
60	Peleg Wadsworth	F	MA-13	March 4, 1793	(P) 1793–95
61	Richard Winn	DR	SC-4	March 4, 1793	(A) 1793–95. Last term while serving as a member of the House until 7th Congress.
62	Uriah Tracy	F	CT-al	April 8, 1793	(P) April 8, 1793–95. Chairman: Claims. Resigned on October 13, 1796, while still serving as a member of the House.
63	Joshua Coit	F	CT-al	November 11, 1793	(P) November 11, 1793–95
64	Zephaniah Swift	F	CT-al	November 11, 1793	(P) November 11, 1793–95. Last term while serving as a member of the House.
65	John Patten	DR	DE-al	March 4, 1795	Previously served (A) 1793-February 14, 1794 while in the House. Last term while serving as a member of the House.
66	Gabriel Duvall	DR	MD-2	May 5, 1794	(A) May 5, 1794–95. Resigned on March 28, 1796, while still serving in the House.
67	Aaron Kitchell	F	NJ-al	January 29, 1795	Previously served (P) 1791-93 while as a member of the House. (P) January 29-March 3, 1795. Last term while serving as a member of the House until 6th Congress.
68	Robert G. Harper	F	SC-5	February 9, 1795	Special election to 3rd Congress: October 13–14, 1794. (P) February 9-March 3, 1795.
Two non-consecutive terms
69	Robert Barnwell	F	SC-2	March 4, 1795	Previously served (P) 1791-93 while in the House. Declined to serve, as Representative-elect, before the Congress started.
70	John Hathorn	D-R	NY-4	March 4, 1795	Previously served (A) 1789-91 while as a member of the House. Last term while serving as a member of the House.
71	Abiel Foster	F	NH-al	March 4, 1795	Previously served (P) June 22, 1789-91 while as a member of the House.
72	John Milledge	D-R	GA-al	March 4, 1795	Previously served (A) November 22, 1792-93 while as a member of the House.
One term
73	David Bard	DR	PA-10	March 4, 1795	
74	Theophilus Bradbury	F	MA-11	March 4, 1795	Elected to this Congress: March 23, 1795
75	Richard Brent	DR	VA-17	March 4, 1795	Elected to this Congress: March 16, 1795
76	Nathan Bryan	DR	NC-10	March 4, 1795	
77	Daniel Buck	F	VT-2	March 4, 1795	Only term while serving as a member of the House (elected to 5th Congress but did not serve)
78	Dempsey Burges	DR	NC-8	March 4, 1795	
79	Samuel J. Cabell	DR	VA-14	March 4, 1795	Elected to this Congress: March 16, 1795
80	John Clopton	DR	VA-13	March 4, 1795	Elected to this Congress: March 16, 1795
81	William Cooper	F	NY-10	March 4, 1795	Only term while serving as a member of the House until 6th Congress
82	Jeremiah Crabb	F	MD-3	March 4, 1795	Only term while serving in the House. Resigned 1796 while still serving as a member of the House.
83	Samuel Earle	DR	SC-6	March 4, 1795	Only term while serving as a member of the House.
84	Jesse Franklin	DR	NC-3	March 4, 1795	Only term while serving as a member of the House.
85	Nathaniel Freeman, Jr.	F	MA-5	March 4, 1795	
86	Albert Gallatin	DR	PA-12	March 4, 1795	
87	Chauncey Goodrich	F	CT-al	March 4, 1795	
88	Roger Griswold	F	CT-al	March 4, 1795	
...	Wade Hampton	DR	SC-2	March 4, 1795	Special election before start of term. Only term until 8th Congress.
89	Jonathan N. Havens	DR	NY-1	March 4, 1795	
90	Thomas Henderson	F	NJ-al	March 4, 1795	Only term while serving as a member of the House.
91	James Holland	DR	NC-1	March 4, 1795	Only term while serving as a member of the House until 7th Congress
92	George Jackson	DR	VA-3	March 4, 1795	Elected to this Congress: March 16, 1795. Only term while serving as a member of the House until 6th Congress
93	Edward Livingston	DR	NY-2	March 4, 1795	
94	Samuel Lyman	F	MA-3	March 4, 1795	
95	Samuel Maclay	DR	PA-6	March 4, 1795	Only term while serving as a member of the House.
96	John Reed, Sr.	F	MA-6	March 4, 1795	
97	John Richards	DR	PA-4	March 4, 1795	Seated, after an election dispute: January 18, 1796. Only term while serving as a member of the House.
98	Samuel Sitgreaves	F	PA-4	March 4, 1795	
99	Isaac Smith	F	NJ-al	March 4, 1795	Only term while serving as a member of the House.
100	John Swanwick	DR	PA-1	March 4, 1795	Chairman: Commerce and Manufactures (1796)
101	Absalom Tatom	DR	NC-4	March 4, 1795	Resigned on June 1, 1796, while serving as a member of the House.
102	Richard Thomas	F	PA-3	March 4, 1795	
103	Mark Thomson	F	NJ-al	March 4, 1795	
104	Joseph B. Varnum	DR	MA-9	March 4, 1795	Elected to this Congress: March 28, 1795
105	John Williams	F	NY-9	March 4, 1795	
Members joining the House, after the start of the Congress
...	Nathaniel Smith	F	CT-al	April 13, 1795	Special election
...	Richard Sprigg, Jr.	DR	MD-2	May 5, 1796	Special election
...	Elisha R. Potter	F	RI-al	November 15, 1796	Special election
...	William F. Strudwick	F	NC-4	November 28, 1796	Special election. Only term while serving as a member of the House.
...	William Craik	F	MD-3	December 5, 1796	Special election
...	James Davenport	F	CT-al	December 5, 1796	Special election
106	Andrew Jackson	D-R	TN-al	December 5, 1796	Representative from a new state
...	Samuel Sewall	F	MA-10	December 7, 1796	Special election
...	George Ege	F	PA-5	December 8, 1796	Special election
...	Samuel W. Dana	F	CT-al	January 3, 1797	Special election
...	Thomson J. Skinner	DR	MA-1	January 27, 1797	Special election
Non voting Member
a	James White	-	TN-al	September 4, 1794	Delegate from the Southwest Territory (later TN). Term ended June 1, 1796 when TN admitted.

== See also ==
- 4th United States Congress
- List of United States congressional districts
- List of United States senators in the 4th Congress
