= List of United States senators in the 4th Congress =

This is a complete list of United States senators during the 4th United States Congress listed by seniority from March 4, 1795, to March 3, 1797.

The United States Senate has an official chronological list of senators, accessible from its website, which provides information about the seniority of senators serving in the relevant Congress.

== Seniority rules ==
A Chronological List of United States Senators includes the following explanation of how it assigns seniority.

From 1789 to 1958, senators whose terms began on the same day are listed alphabetically. Beginning in 1959, senators are listed according to commencement of first Senate term by order of service, determined by former service in order as senator, vice president, House member, cabinet secretary, governor, and then by state population. This latter system for calculating order of service has been used by the modern Senate for many years for the purposes of office assignment. It is unclear just when the Senate first began applying such criteria.

Rank column: This consecutively numbers senators, serving in the relevant Congress, according to seniority in that Congress. Seniority is based upon the method used by the chronological list. If the senator is not the first person to hold the seat, in the Congress, then he is given the number of the preceding senator followed by a lower case letter. In addition, if the senator would have had different seniority (if the method used from 1959 was followed) a further number is given in brackets and italicised

A senator with broken service is placed before other senators starting service on the same day, but after senators with unbroken service starting before that date.

Senate No. column: The chronological guide gives an official number to each senator. This is the number set out in this column. That number is retained even if the senator has broken service.

As an historical article, the states and party affiliations listed reflect those during the Congress. Seats and party affiliations on similar lists for other congresses will be different for certain members. During this Congress, there were two parties represented. Senators are classified as Democratic-Republican (DR) or Federalist (F).

== Terms of service ==
Class	Terms of service of senators that expired in years
Class 2	Terms of service of senators that expired in 1797 (DE, GA, KY, MA, NC, NH, NJ, RI, SC, TN, and VA.)
Class 3	Terms of service of senators that expired in 1799 (CT, DE, MD, NH, NJ, NY, PA, RI, SC, and VT.)
Class 1	Terms of service of senators that expired in 1801 (CT, GA, IN, KY, LA, MA, MD, NC, NY, PA, TN, VA, and VT.)

== U.S. Senate seniority list ==
Rank	Historical rank	Senator (party-state)	Seniority date	Alternative rank
1	2	Pierce Butler (DR-SC)	March 4, 1789	None of the factors apply to members first elected to the 1st and 2nd congresses, so alphabetical order is used. The results of the 1790 census were not available until after the 2nd Congress convened in 1791.
2	5	Oliver Ellsworth (F-CT)	March 4, 1789	None of the factors apply to members first elected to the 1st and 2nd congresses, so alphabetical order is used. The results of the 1790 census were not available until after the 2nd Congress convened in 1791.
3	9	James Gunn (F-GA)	March 4, 1789	None of the factors apply to members first elected to the 1st and 2nd congresses, so alphabetical order is used. The results of the 1790 census were not available until after the 2nd Congress convened in 1791.
4	10	John Henry (F-MD)	March 4, 1789	None of the factors apply to members first elected to the 1st and 2nd congresses, so alphabetical order is used. The results of the 1790 census were not available until after the 2nd Congress convened in 1791.
5	13	John Langdon (DR-NH)	March 4, 1789	None of the factors apply to members first elected to the 1st and 2nd congresses, so alphabetical order is used. The results of the 1790 census were not available until after the 2nd Congress convened in 1791.
6	20	Caleb Strong (F-MA)	March 4, 1789	None of the factors apply to members first elected to the 1st and 2nd congresses, so alphabetical order is used. The results of the 1790 census were not available until after the 2nd Congress convened in 1791.
7	22	Rufus King (F-NY)	July 16, 1789	None of the factors apply to members first elected to the 1st and 2nd congresses, so alphabetical order is used. The results of the 1790 census were not available until after the 2nd Congress convened in 1791.
8	26	Theodore Foster (F-RI)	June 7, 1790	None of the factors apply to members first elected to the 1st and 2nd congresses, so alphabetical order is used. The results of the 1790 census were not available until after the 2nd Congress convened in 1791.
9	31	Aaron Burr (DR-NY)	March 4, 1791	None of the factors apply to members first elected to the 1st and 2nd congresses, so alphabetical order is used. The results of the 1790 census were not available until after the 2nd Congress convened in 1791.
10	32	George Cabot (F-MA)	March 4, 1791	None of the factors apply to members first elected to the 1st and 2nd congresses, so alphabetical order is used. The results of the 1790 census were not available until after the 2nd Congress convened in 1791.
11	33	John Rutherfurd (F-NJ)	March 4, 1791	None of the factors apply to members first elected to the 1st and 2nd congresses, so alphabetical order is used. The results of the 1790 census were not available until after the 2nd Congress convened in 1791.
12	35	Moses Robinson (DR-VT)	October 17, 1791	
13	36	John Brown (DR-KY)	June 18, 1792	
14	39	Richard Potts (F-MD)	January 10, 1793	
15 (19)	40	William Bradford (F-RI)	March 4, 1793	Livermore, House 4 years; Jackson, House 2 years; Martin, governor (including a period after ratification of the constitution by NC); Frelinghuysen, NJ 9th in population (1790 census); Bradford, RI 14th in population (1790 census); Vining, DE 15th in population (1790 census).
16 (18)	41	Frederick Frelinghuysen (F-NJ)	March 4, 1793	Livermore, House 4 years; Jackson, House 2 years; Martin, governor (including a period after ratification of the constitution by NC); Frelinghuysen, NJ 9th in population (1790 census); Bradford, RI 14th in population (1790 census); Vining, DE 15th in population (1790 census).
17 (16)	42	James Jackson (DR-GA)	March 4, 1793	Livermore, House 4 years; Jackson, House 2 years; Martin, governor (including a period after ratification of the constitution by NC); Frelinghuysen, NJ 9th in population (1790 census); Bradford, RI 14th in population (1790 census); Vining, DE 15th in population (1790 census).
18 (15)	43	Samuel Livermore (F-NH)	March 4, 1793	Livermore, House 4 years; Jackson, House 2 years; Martin, governor (including a period after ratification of the constitution by NC); Frelinghuysen, NJ 9th in population (1790 census); Bradford, RI 14th in population (1790 census); Vining, DE 15th in population (1790 census).
19 (17)	44	Alexander Martin (DR-NC)	March 4, 1793	Livermore, House 4 years; Jackson, House 2 years; Martin, governor (including a period after ratification of the constitution by NC); Frelinghuysen, NJ 9th in population (1790 census); Bradford, RI 14th in population (1790 census); Vining, DE 15th in population (1790 census).
20	45	John Vining (F-DE)	March 4, 1793	Livermore, House 4 years; Jackson, House 2 years; Martin, governor (including a period after ratification of the constitution by NC); Frelinghuysen, NJ 9th in population (1790 census); Bradford, RI 14th in population (1790 census); Vining, DE 15th in population (1790 census).
21	47	James Ross (F-PA)	April 24, 1794	
22	48	Stevens Thomson Mason (DR-VA)	November 18, 1794	Two senators from Virginia. No factor applies except state population, which is equal, so alphabetical order is used.
23	49	Henry Tazewell (DR-VA)	November 18, 1794	Two senators from Virginia. No factor applies except state population, which is equal, so alphabetical order is used.
24	50	Henry Latimer (F-DE)	February 7, 1795	
25 (27)	51	William Bingham (F-PA)	March 4, 1795	Trumbull, House 6 years; Bloodworth, House 11 months; Bingham, PA 3rd in population (1790 census); Read, SC 8th in population (1790 census); Paine, VT 11th in population (1790 census); Marshall, KY 13th in population (1790 census).
26	52	Timothy Bloodworth (DR-NC)	March 4, 1795	Trumbull, House 6 years; Bloodworth, House 11 months; Bingham, PA 3rd in population (1790 census); Read, SC 8th in population (1790 census); Paine, VT 11th in population (1790 census); Marshall, KY 13th in population (1790 census).
27 (30)	53	Humphrey Marshall (F-KY)	March 4, 1795	Trumbull, House 6 years; Bloodworth, House 11 months; Bingham, PA 3rd in population (1790 census); Read, SC 8th in population (1790 census); Paine, VT 11th in population (1790 census); Marshall, KY 13th in population (1790 census).
28 (29)	54	Elijah Paine (F-VT)	March 4, 1795	Trumbull, House 6 years; Bloodworth, House 11 months; Bingham, PA 3rd in population (1790 census); Read, SC 8th in population (1790 census); Paine, VT 11th in population (1790 census); Marshall, KY 13th in population (1790 census).
29 (28)	55	Jacob Read (F-SC)	March 4, 1795	Trumbull, House 6 years; Bloodworth, House 11 months; Bingham, PA 3rd in population (1790 census); Read, SC 8th in population (1790 census); Paine, VT 11th in population (1790 census); Marshall, KY 13th in population (1790 census).
30 (25)	56	Jonathan Trumbull Jr. (F-CT)	March 4, 1795	Trumbull, House 6 years; Bloodworth, House 11 months; Bingham, PA 3rd in population (1790 census); Read, SC 8th in population (1790 census); Paine, VT 11th in population (1790 census); Marshall, KY 13th in population (1790 census).
30a	57	George Walton (F-GA)	November 16, 1795	
30b	58	Josiah Tattnall (DR-GA)	February 20, 1796	
30d	59	Benjamin Goodhue (F-MA)	June 11, 1796	Two senators from Massachusetts. No factors apply except House service and state population, which are equal, so alphabetical order is used.
30e	60	Theodore Sedgwick (F-MA)	June 11, 1796	Two senators from Massachusetts. No factors apply except House service and state population, which are equal, so alphabetical order is used.
31	61	William Blount (DR-TN)	August 2, 1796	Two senators from Tennessee. No factor applies except state population, which is equal, so alphabetical order is used.
32	62	William Cocke (DR-TN)	August 2, 1796	Two senators from Tennessee. No factor applies except state population, which is equal, so alphabetical order is used.
32a	63	Uriah Tracy (F-CT)	October 13, 1796	
32b	64	Isaac Tichenor (F-VT)	October 18, 1796	
32c	65	John Laurance (F-NY)	November 9, 1796	
32d	66	Richard Stockton (F-NJ)	November 12, 1796	
32e	67	John Eager Howard (F-MD)	November 30, 1796	
30c	68	James Hillhouse (F-CT)	December 6, 1796	
32f	69	John Hunter (DR-SC)	December 8, 1796	

== See also ==
- 4th United States Congress
- List of United States representatives in the 4th Congress
