= List of United States senators in the 5th Congress =

This is a complete list of United States senators during the 5th United States Congress listed by seniority from March 4, 1797, to March 3, 1799.

The United States Senate has an official chronological list of senators, accessible from its website.

== Seniority rules ==
A Chronological List of United States Senators includes the following explanation of how it assigns seniority.

From 1789 to 1958, senators whose terms began on the same day are listed alphabetically. Beginning in 1959, senators are listed according to commencement of first Senate term by order of service, determined by former service in order as senator, vice president, House member, cabinet secretary, governor, and then by state population. This latter system for calculating order of service has been used by the modern Senate for many years for the purposes of office assignment. It is unclear just when the Senate first began applying such criteria.

Rank column: This consecutively numbers senators, serving in the relevant Congress, according to seniority in that Congress. Seniority is based upon the method used by the chronological list. If the senator is not the first person to hold the seat, no number is included in the list.

A senator with broken service is placed before other senators starting service on the same day, but after senators with unbroken service starting before that date.

Senate No. column: The chronological guide gives an official number to each senator. This is the number set out in this column. That number is retained even if the senator has broken service.

As an historical article, the states and party affiliations listed reflect those during the Congress. Seats and party affiliations on similar lists for other congresses will be different for certain members. During this Congress, there were two parties represented. Senators are classified as Democratic-Republican (DR) or Federalist (F).

== Terms of service ==
Class	Terms of service of senators that expired in years
Class 2	Terms of service of senators that expired in 1799 (DE, GA, KY, MA, NC, NH, NJ, RI, SC, TN, and VA.)
Class 3	Terms of service of senators that expired in 1801 (CT, DE, MD, NH, NJ, NY, PA, RI, SC, and VT.)
Class 1	Terms of service of senators that expired in 1803 (CT, GA, IN, KY, MA, MD, NC, NY, PA, TN, VA, and VT.)

== Seniority list ==
Rank	Historical rank	Senator (party-state)	Seniority date
1	9	James Gunn (F-GA)	March 4, 1789
2	10	John Henry (F-MD)	March 4, 1789
3	13	John Langdon (DR-NH)	March 4, 1789
4	26	Theodore Foster (F-RI)	June 7, 1790
5	33	John Rutherfurd (F-NJ)	March 4, 1791
6	36	John Brown (DR-KY)	June 18, 1792
7	40	William Bradford (F-RI)	March 4, 1793
8	43	Samuel Livermore (F-NH)	March 4, 1793
9	44	Alexander Martin (DR-NC)	March 4, 1793
10	45	John Vining (F-DE)	March 4, 1793
11	47	James Ross (F-PA)	April 24, 1794
12	48	Stevens Thomson Mason (DR-VA)	November 18, 1794
13	49	Henry Tazewell (DR-VA)	November 18, 1794
14	50	Henry Latimer (F-DE)	February 7, 1795
15	51	William Bingham (F-PA)	March 4, 1795
16	52	Timothy Bloodworth (DR-NC)	March 4, 1795
17	53	Humphrey Marshall (F-KY)	March 4, 1795
18	54	Elijah Paine (F-VT)	March 4, 1795
19	55	Jacob Read (F-SC)	March 4, 1795
20	58	Josiah Tattnall (DR-GA)	February 20, 1796
21	59	Benjamin Goodhue (F-MA)	June 11, 1796
22	60	Theodore Sedgwick (F-MA)	June 11, 1796
23	61	William Blount (DR-TN)	August 2, 1796
24	62	William Cocke (DR-TN)	August 2, 1796
25	63	Uriah Tracy (DR-CT)	October 13, 1796
26	64	Isaac Tichenor (F-VT)	October 18, 1796
27	65	John Laurance (F-NY)	November 9, 1796
28	66	Richard Stockton (F-NJ)	November 12, 1796
29	67	John Eager Howard (F-MD)	November 30, 1796
30	68	James Hillhouse (F-CT)	December 6, 1796
31	69	John Hunter (DR-SC)	December 8, 1796
32	22	Philip John Schuyler (F-NY)	March 4, 1797
...	70	Joseph Inslee Anderson (DR-TN)	September 26, 1797
...	71	Andrew Jackson (DR-TN)	September 26, 1797
...	72	Nathaniel Chipman (F-VT)	October 17, 1797
...	73	Ray Greene (F-RI)	November 13, 1797
...	74	James Lloyd (F-MD)	December 11, 1797
...	75	John Sloss Hobart (F-NY)	January 11, 1798
...	76	Joshua Clayton (F-DE)	January 19, 1798
...	77	William North (F-NY)	May 15, 1798
...	78	James Watson (F-NY)	August 17, 1798
...	79	Daniel Smith (DR-TN)	October 6, 1798
...	80	Franklin Davenport (F-NJ)	December 5, 1798
...	81	Charles Pinckney (DR-SC)	December 6, 1798
...	82	William Hill Wells (F-DE)	January 17, 1799

== See also ==
- 5th United States Congress
- List of United States representatives in the 5th Congress
