= Alexander Mebane =

American politician (1744–1795)

Member of the U.S. House of Representatives from North Carolina's 4th district
- In office March 4, 1793 – July 5, 1795
- Preceded by: Hugh Williamson
- Succeeded by: Absalom Tatom

Personal details
- Born: November 26, 1744 Lancaster County, Pennsylvania, British America
- Died: July 5, 1795 (aged 50) Hawfields, North Carolina, U.S.
- Spouse: Mary Armstrong

Military service
- Allegiance: United States of America
- Branch/service: North Carolina militia
- Years of service: 1775–1789
- Rank: Brigadier General
- Commands: Orange County Regiment of the North Carolina militia (1776–1780), Commissary General for the State of North Carolina (1780–1783)
- Battles/wars: American Revolutionary War; Battle of Lindley's Mill

Alexander Mebane Jr. (November 26, 1744 – July 5, 1795) was a U.S. Congressman from the state of North Carolina from 1793 to 1795. He was also a brigadier general in the North Carolina militia during the Revolutionary War.

== Early life ==
Alexander Mebane Jr. was one of twelve children born to Alexander Mebane Sr. and Mary Tinnin. Born in Lancaster County in the Province of Pennsylvania, he moved to Hawfields, North Carolina, by the time his father received a land grant in 1754. Mebane attended common schools in Orange County. He served as a delegate to the Provincial Congress of North Carolina in 1776, was named justice of the peace in 1776, the first sheriff of Orange County under statehood in 1777, and auditor of the Hillsborough district in 1783 and 1784.

== Military service ==
Alexander served in the following positions during the American Revolution:

- Colonel in the Southern Orange County Regiment of militia (1776–1777)
- Colonel over the Orange County Regiment of militia (1777–1780)
- Commissary General for the State of North Carolina, with the rank of Brigadier General (1780–1783)
- Colonel of the horse for the Hillsborough District (1788)
- General of the Hillsborough District (1789)

== Political career ==
Mebane was an Anti-Federalist member of the conventions in Hillsborough in 1788 and in Fayetteville in 1789 which considered ratification of the United States Constitution. Mebane served in the North Carolina House of Commons from 1787 to 1792, unsuccessfully ran for the 2nd congressional district in 1791, and was elected to the 3rd United States Congress in 1792, where he served one term representing the 4th congressional district (March 4, 1793 – March 3, 1795). He was re-elected to the 4th United States Congress, but died before the term began. Mebane was one of the original trustees of the University of North Carolina at Chapel Hill.

== Death ==
Alexander Mebane, Jr. died at Hawfields in Orange County, on July 5, 1795, shortly after he finished his first term in Congress. He is buried at First Hawfields Burying Ground, Cheeks Township, Orange County, North Carolina.

Mebane, North Carolina is named for him.

U.S. House of Representatives
Preceded by Hugh Williamson	Member of the U.S. House of Representatives from North Carolina's 4th congressional district 1793–1795	Succeeded by Absalom Tatom
