= George W. Erving =

American diplomat

4th United States Minister to Spain
- In office August 24, 1816 – May 15, 1819
- Preceded by: Charles Pinckney
- Succeeded by: John Forsyth

Personal details
- Born: 1769
- Died: July 22, 1850 (aged 80–81)

George William Erving (1769—July 22, 1850) was an American diplomat.

He was U.S. Consul in London, from 1801 to 1804. He was Chargé d'Affaires of the United States in Madrid from 1804 to 1809, Special Negotiator to Copenhagen in 1811, and U.S. Minister to Spain, from 1814 to 1819. He was United States Chargé d'Affaires to the Ottoman Empire, before 1831. Erving was elected a member of the American Antiquarian Society in 1834.

His papers are held at Yale University.
