= List of United States representatives in the 5th Congress =

This is a complete list of United States representatives during the 5th United States Congress listed by seniority. For the most part, representatives are ranked by the beginning of their terms in office.

As an historical article, the districts and party affiliations listed reflect those during the 5th Congress (March 4, 1797 – March 3, 1799). Seats and party affiliations on similar lists for other congresses will be different for certain members.

This article describes the criteria for seniority in the House of Representatives and sets out the list of members by seniority. It is prepared on the basis of the interpretation of seniority applied to the House of Representatives in the current congress. In the absence of information to the contrary, it is presumed that the twenty-first-century practice is identical to the seniority customs used during the 5th Congress.

== House seniority ==
Seniority in the House, for representatives with unbroken service, depends on the date on which the members first term began. That date is either the start of the Congress (4 March in odd-numbered years, for the era up to and including the 73rd Congress starting in 1933) or the date of a special election during the Congress. Since many members start serving on the same day as others, ranking between them is based on alphabetical order by the last name of the representative.

Representatives in early congresses were often elected after the legal start of the Congress. Representatives are attributed with unbroken seniority, from the legal start of the congressional term, if they were the first person elected to a seat in a Congress. The date of the election is indicated in a note.

The seniority date is normally taken from the members entry in the Biographical Directory of the United States Congress, except where the date given is the legal start of the Congress and the actual election (for someone who was not the first person elected to the seat in that Congress) was later. The date of election is taken from United States Congressional Elections 1788-1997. In a few instances the latter work provides dates, for the start and end of terms, which correct those in the Biographical Directory.

The Biographical Directory normally uses the date of a special election, as the seniority date. However, mostly in early congresses, the date of the member taking his seat can be the one given. The date of the special election is mentioned in a note to the list below, when that date is not used as the seniority date by the Biographical Directory.

Representatives who returned to the House, after having previously served, are credited with service equal to one less than the total number of terms they served. When a representative has served a prior term of less than two terms (i.e., prior term minus one equals less than one), he is ranked above all others whose service begins on the same day.

== Leadership ==
In this Congress the only formal leader was the speaker of the House. A speakership ballot was held on May 15, 1797, and Jonathan Dayton (F-NJ) was re-elected for a second consecutive term.

== Standing committees ==
The House created its first standing committee, on April 13, 1789. There were four standing committees, listed in the rules of the 5th Congress. In addition there was a Ways and Means Committee. Although the Ways and Means Committee was not formally added to the main list of standing committees until 1802, the current committee considers it to be a forerunner.

Committees, in this period, were appointed for a session at a time and not necessarily for every one in a Congress. The speaker appointed the members.

This list refers to the standing committees of the House in the 5th Congress, the year of establishment as a standing committee, the number of members assigned to the committee and the dates of appointment in each session, the end of the session and its chairman. Chairmen, who were re-appointed after serving in the previous Congress, are indicated by an *.

No.	Committee	From	Members	Appointed	Chairman
1	Claims	1794	7	November 21, 1797 – July 16, 1798	*Dwight Foster (F-MA)
1	Claims	1794	7	December 10, 1798 – March 3, 1799	*Dwight Foster (F-MA)
2	Commerce and Manufactures	1795	7	November 21, 1797 – July 16, 1798	Edward Livingston (DR-NY)
2	Commerce and Manufactures	1795	7	December 10, 1798 – March 3, 1799	Samuel Smith (DR-MD)
3	Elections	1789	7	May 15, 1797 – July 10, 1797	Joshua Coit (F-CT)
3	Elections	1789	7	November 17, 1797 – July 16, 1798	Joshua Coit (F-CT)
3	Elections	1789	7	December 5, 1798 – March 3, 1799	Joseph B. Varnum (DR-MA)
4	Revisal and Unfinished Business	1795	3	May 18, 1797 – July 10, 1797	Jeremiah Smith (F-NH)
4	Revisal and Unfinished Business	1795	3	November 15, 1797 – July 16, 1798	Nathaniel Macon (DR-NC)
4	Revisal and Unfinished Business	1795	3	December 10, 1798 – March 3, 1799	George Thatcher (F-MA)
5	Ways and Means	[1794]	7	June 10, 1797 – July 10, 1797	*William L. Smith (F-SC)
5	Ways and Means	[1794]	16	December 4, 1797 – July 16, 1798	Robert G. Harper (F-SC)
5	Ways and Means	[1794]	9	December 14, 1798 – March 3, 1799	Robert G. Harper (F-SC)

== List of representatives by seniority ==
A numerical rank is assigned to each of the 106 members initially elected to the 5th Congress. Other members, who were not the first person elected to a seat but who joined the House during the Congress, are not assigned a number.

Four representatives-elect were not sworn in, as one refused to serve and three resigned. The list below includes the representatives-elect (with name in italics), with the seniority they would have held if they had been sworn in.

Party designations used in this article are D-R for Democratic-Republican members and F for Federalist representatives. Designations used for service in the first three congresses are (A) for Anti-Administration members and (P) for Pro-Administration representatives.

U.S. House seniority
Rank	Representative	Party	District	Seniority date	Notes
Five consecutive terms
1	Abraham Baldwin	DR	GA-al	March 4, 1789	(A) 1789–95. Last term while serving as a member of the House.
2	Thomas Hartley	F	PA-8	March 4, 1789	(P) 1789-95
3	Josiah Parker	F	VA-11	March 4, 1789	(A) 1789-93; (P) 1793–95. Elected to this Congress: March 20, 1797.
4	William L. Smith	F	SC-1	March 4, 1789	(P) 1789–95. Chairman: Ways and Means. Resigned on July 10, 1797, while still serving as a member of the House.
5	George Thatcher	F	MA-14	March 4, 1789	(P) 1789–95. Chairman: Revisal and Unfinished Business (1798).
6	William B. Giles	DR	VA-9	December 7, 1790	(A) December 7, 1790–95. Elected to this Congress: March 20, 1797. Resigned on October 2, 1798, while still serving as a member of the House. Last term while serving as a member of the House until 7th Congress.
7	Benjamin Bourne	F	RI-al	December 17, 1790	(P) December 17, 1790–95. Resigned, as Representative-elect: 1796.
Four consecutive terms
8	Jonathan Dayton	F	NJ-al	March 4, 1791	(P) 1791–95. Speaker of the House. Last term while serving as a member of the House.
9	William Findley	DR	PA-11	March 4, 1791	(A) 1791–95. Last term while serving as a member of the House until 8th Congress.
10	Andrew Gregg	DR	PA-9	March 4, 1791	(A) 1791-95
11	William B. Grove	F	NC-7	March 4, 1791	(P) 1791-95
12	John W. Kittera	F	PA-7	March 4, 1791	(P) 1791-95
13	Nathaniel Macon	DR	NC-5	March 4, 1791	(A) 1791–95. Chairman: Revisal and Unfinished Business (1797).
14	Jeremiah Smith	F	NH-al	March 4, 1791	(P) 1791–95. Chairman: Revisal and Unfinished Business. Resigned on July 26, 1797, while still serving as a member of the House.
15	Abraham B. Venable	DR	VA-7	March 4, 1791	(A) 1791–95. Elected to this Congress: March 20, 1797. Last term while serving as a member of the House.
16	William Hindman	F	MD-7	January 30, 1793	(P) January 30, 1793–95. Last term while serving as a member of the House.
Three consecutive terms
17	Lemuel Benton	DR	SC-3	March 4, 1793	(A) 1793–95. Last term while serving as a member of the House.
18	Thomas Blount	DR	NC-9	March 4, 1793	(A) 1793–95. Last term while serving as a member of the House until 9th Congress.
19	Thomas Claiborne	DR	VA-8	March 4, 1793	(A) 1793–95. Elected to this Congress: March 20, 1797. Last term while serving as a member of the House until 7th Congress.
20	George Dent	F	MD-1	March 4, 1793	(P) 1793-95
21	Dwight Foster	F	MA-4	March 4, 1793	(P) 1793–95. Chairman: Claims.
22	James Gillespie	DR	NC-6	March 4, 1793	(A) 1793–95. Last term while serving as a member of the House until 8th Congress.
23	Henry Glen	F	NY-8	March 4, 1793	(P) 1793-95
24	Carter B. Harrison	DR	VA-10	March 4, 1793	(A) 1793–95. Elected to this Congress: March 20, 1797. Last term while serving as a member of the House.
25	Matthew Locke	DR	NC-2	March 4, 1793	(A) 1793–95. Last term while serving as a member of the House.
26	Anthony New	DR	VA-16	March 4, 1793	(A) 1793–95. Elected to this Congress: March 20, 1797.
27	John Nicholas	DR	VA-18	March 4, 1793	(A) 1793–95. Elected to this Congress: March 20, 1797.
28	Samuel Smith	DR	MD-5	March 4, 1793	(A) 1793–95. Chairman: Commerce and Manufactures (1798).
29	John E. Van Alen	F	NY-7	March 4, 1793	(P) 1793–95. Last term while serving as a member of the House.
30	Philip Van Cortlandt	DR	NY-3	March 4, 1793	(A) 1793-95
31	Peleg Wadsworth	F	MA-13	March 4, 1793	(P) 1793-95
32	Uriah Tracy	F	CT-al	April 8, 1793	(P) April 8, 1793–95. Resigned, as Representative-elect: October 13, 1796.
33	Joshua Coit	F	CT-al	November 11, 1793	(P) November 11, 1793–95. Chairman: Elections. Died on September 5, 1798, while still serving as a member of the House.
34	Zephaniah Swift	F	CT-al	November 11, 1793	(P) November 11, 1793–95. Resigned, as a Representative-elect, probably before his term started.
35	Robert G. Harper	F	SC-5	February 9, 1795	(P) February 9-March 3, 1795. Chairman: Ways and Means (1797).
Three non-consecutive terms
36	Thomas Sumter	D-R	SC-4	March 4, 1797	Previously served (A) 1789-93 while as a member of the House.
37	Abiel Foster	F	NH-al	March 4, 1795	Previously served (P) June 22, 1789-91 while as a member of the House.
38	John Milledge	D-R	GA-al	March 4, 1795	Previously served (A) November 22, 1792-93 while as a member of the House. Last term while serving as a member of the House until 7th Congress.
Two consecutive terms
39	David Bard	DR	PA-10	March 4, 1795	Last term while serving as a member of the House until 8th Congress.
40	Theophilus Bradbury	F	MA-11	March 4, 1795	Resigned on July 24, 1797, while still serving as a member of the House.
41	Richard Brent	DR	VA-17	March 4, 1795	Elected to this Congress: March 20, 1797. Last term while serving as a member of the House until 7th Congress.
42	Nathan Bryan	DR	NC-10	March 4, 1795	Died on June 4, 1798, while still serving as a member of the House.
43	Daniel Buck	F	VT-2	March 4, 1795	Refused to serve, when a Representative-elect
44	Dempsey Burges	DR	NC-8	March 4, 1795	Last term while serving as a member of the House.
45	Samuel J. Cabell	DR	VA-14	March 4, 1795	Elected to this Congress: March 20, 1797
46	John Clopton	DR	VA-13	March 4, 1795	Elected to this Congress: March 20, 1797. Last term while serving as a member of the House until 7th Congress.
47	Nathaniel Freeman, Jr.	DR	MA-5	March 4, 1795	(F) 1795–97. Last term while serving as a member of the House.
48	Albert Gallatin	DR	PA-12	March 4, 1795	
49	Chauncey Goodrich	F	CT-al	March 4, 1795	
50	Roger Griswold	F	CT-al	March 4, 1795	
51	Jonathan N. Havens	DR	NY-1	March 4, 1795	
52	Edward Livingston	DR	NY-2	March 4, 1795	Chairman: Commerce and Manufactures (1797)
53	Samuel Lyman	F	MA-3	March 4, 1795	
54	John Reed, Sr.	F	MA-6	March 4, 1795	
55	Samuel Sitgreaves	F	PA-4	March 4, 1795	Resigned in 1798 while still serving as a member of the House.
56	John Swanwick	DR	PA-1	March 4, 1795	Died on August 1, 1798, while still serving as a member of the House.
57	Richard Thomas	F	PA-3	March 4, 1795	
58	Mark Thomson	F	NJ-al	March 4, 1795	Last term while serving as a member of the House.
59	Joseph B. Varnum	DR	MA-9	March 4, 1795	Chairman: Elections (1798)
60	John Williams	F	NY-9	March 4, 1795	Last term while serving as a member of the House.
61	Nathaniel Smith	F	CT-al	April 13, 1795	Last term while serving as a member of the House.
62	Richard Sprigg, Jr.	DR	MD-2	May 5, 1796	Last term while serving as a member of the House until 7th Congress.
...	Elisha R. Potter	F	RI-al	November 15, 1796	Special election before start of term. Resigned in June 1797 while still serving as a member of the House. Last term while serving as a member of the House until 11th Congress.
63	William Craik	F	MD-3	December 5, 1796	
64	Andrew Jackson	D-R	TN-al	December 5, 1796	Resigned, to become a US Senator: September 1797
65	Samuel Sewall	F	MA-10	December 7, 1796	
66	George Ege	F	PA-5	December 8, 1796	Resigned in October 1797 while still serving as a member of the House.
67	Samuel W. Dana	F	CT-al	January 3, 1797	
68	Thomson J. Skinner	DR	MA-1	January 27, 1797	Last term while serving as a member of the House until 8th Congress.
Two non-consecutive terms
69	James Schureman	F	NJ-al	March 4, 1797	Previously served (P) 1789-91 while as a member of the House. Last term while serving as a member of the House until 13th Congress.
70	Thomas Sinnickson	F	NJ-al	March 4, 1797	Previously served (P) 1789-91 while as a member of the House. Last term while serving as a member of the House.
One term
71	George Baer, Jr.	F	MD-4	March 4, 1797	
72	James A. Bayard	F	DE-al	March 4, 1797	
73	David Brooks	F	NY-5	March 4, 1797	Only term while serving as a member of the House.
74	Stephen Bullock	F	MA-7	March 4, 1797	Elected to this Congress: April 3, 1797. Only term while serving as a member of the House.
75	Christopher G. Champlin	F	RI-al	March 4, 1797	
76	John Chapman	F	PA-4	March 4, 1797	Only term while serving as a member of the House.
77	Matthew Clay	DR	VA-6	March 4, 1797	Elected to this Congress: March 20, 1797
78	James Cochran	F	NY-10	March 4, 1797	Only term while serving as a member of the House.
79	Thomas T. Davis	DR	KY-1	March 4, 1797	Elected to this Congress: September 2, 1797
80	John Dawson	DR	VA-15	March 4, 1797	Elected to this Congress: March 20, 1797
81	John Dennis	F	MD-8	March 4, 1797	
82	Lucas C. Elmendorf	DR	NY-4	March 4, 1797	
83	Thomas Evans	F	VA-12	March 4, 1797	Elected to this Congress: March 20, 1797
84	John Fowler	DR	KY-2	March 4, 1797	Elected to this Congress: September 2, 1797
85	Jonathan Freeman	F	NH-al	March 4, 1797	
86	William Gordon	F	NH-al	March 4, 1797	
87	John A. Hanna	DR	PA-6	March 4, 1797	
88	David Holmes	DR	VA-2	March 4, 1797	Elected to this Congress: March 20, 1797
89	Hezekiah L. Hosmer	F	NY-6	March 4, 1797	Only term while serving as a member of the House.
90	James H. Imlay	F	NJ-al	March 4, 1797	
91	Walter Jones	DR	VA-19	March 4, 1797	Elected to this Congress: March 20, 1797. Only term while serving as a member of the House until 8th Congress.
92	Matthew Lyon	DR	VT-1	March 4, 1797	
93	James Machir	F	VA-3	March 4, 1797	Elected to this Congress: March 20, 1797. Only term while serving as a member of the House.
94	William Matthews	F	MD-6	March 4, 1797	Only term while serving as a member of the House.
95	Blair McClenachan	DR	PA-2	March 4, 1797	Only term while serving as a member of the House.
96	Joseph McDowell	DR	NC-1	March 4, 1797	Only term while serving as a member of the House.
97	Daniel Morgan	F	VA-1	March 4, 1797	Elected to this Congress: March 20, 1797. Only term while serving as a member of the House.
98	Harrison G. Otis	F	MA-8	March 4, 1797	
99	Isaac Parker	F	MA-12	March 4, 1797	Elected to this Congress: April 3, 1797. Only term while serving as a member of the House.
100	John Rutledge, Jr.	F	SC-2	March 4, 1797	
101	William Shepard	F	MA-2	March 4, 1797	
102	William Smith	DR	SC-6	March 4, 1797	Only term while serving as a member of the House.
103	Richard Stanford	DR	NC-4	March 4, 1797	
104	Abram Trigg	DR	VA-4	March 4, 1797	Elected to this Congress: March 20, 1797
105	John J. Trigg	DR	VA-5	March 4, 1797	Elected to this Congress: March 20, 1797
106	Robert Williams	DR	NC-3	March 4, 1797	
Members joining the House, after the start of the Congress
...	James Davenport	F	CT-al	April 10, 1797	Previously served December 5, 1796–97. Special election. Died on August 3, 1797, while still serving as a member of the House.
...	John Allen	F	CT-al	April 10, 1797	Special election. Only term while serving in the House (elected to but did not serve in 6th Congress)
...	Lewis R. Morris	F	VT-2	May 22, 1797	Special election
...	William Edmond	F	CT-al	November 13, 1797	Special election: September 18, 1797
...	Thomas Tillinghast	F	RI-al	November 13, 1797	Special election: August 29, 1797. Only term while serving in the House until 7th Congress.
...	William C. C. Claiborne	D-R	TN-al	November 23, 1797	Special election: October 15, 1797
...	Thomas Pinckney	F	SC-1	November 23, 1797	Special election: September 4–5, 1797
...	Bailey Bartlett	F	MA-11	November 27, 1797	Special election: August 4, 1797
...	Peleg Sprague	F	NH-al	December 15, 1797	Special election: October 30, 1797
...	Joseph Hiester	DR	PA-5	December 1, 1798	Special election: October 10, 1797
...	Jonathan Brace	F	CT-al	December 3, 1798	Special election: October 22, 1798
...	Joseph Eggleston	DR	VA-9	December 3, 1798	Special election: November 1, 1798
...	Robert Waln	F	PA-1	December 3, 1798	Special election: October 9, 1798
...	Robert Brown	DR	PA-4	December 4, 1798	Special election: October 9, 1798
...	Richard D. Spaight	DR	NC-10	December 10, 1798	Special election: August 2, 1798

== See also ==
- 5th United States Congress
- List of United States congressional districts
- List of United States senators in the 5th Congress
