= John E. Colhoun =

American politician (1749–1802)

John Ewing Colhoun
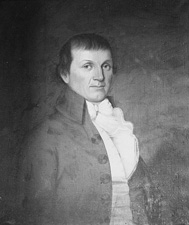

United States Senator from South Carolina
- In office March 4, 1801 – October 26, 1802
- Preceded by: Jacob Read
- Succeeded by: Pierce Butler

Member of the South Carolina House of Representatives
- In office 1778–1800

Personal details
- Born: John Ewing Colhoun c. 1749 Staunton, Virginia
- Died: October 26, 1802 (aged 52–53) Pendleton, South Carolina, U.S.
- Party: Democratic-Republican
- Spouse: Floride Bonneau
- Children: 3, including Floride Calhoun
- Education: Princeton University
- Occupation: Planter, legislator
- Profession: Lawyer
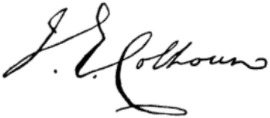
- Signature

John Ewing Colhoun (c. 1749 – October 26, 1802) was a United States senator and lawyer from South Carolina.

Colhoun, was born in Staunton, Virginia, where he attended common schools before graduating from the College of New Jersey (now Princeton University) in 1774. He was a member of the South Carolina House of Representatives from 1778 to 1800. He studied to be a lawyer and was admitted to the bar in 1783, commencing practice in Charleston, South Carolina. He was a farmer and was elected a member of the privy council and was also a commissioner of confiscated estates in 1785.

== Origin and family ==
Colhoun (and Calhoun) is a surname that originated in Ulster to where Colhoun's great-great-great-grandfather Robert Colquhoun migrated from Dumbarton, Dunbartonshire, in Scotland. Colhoun was born to Ulster Scots immigrants to colonial America from County Donegal. Colhoun appears to have himself changed his surname from Calhoun to Colhoun.

Colhoun married Floride Bonneau a member of a prominent Charleston, South Carolina, Huguenot family. They had three children: John Ewing Jr. who became a planter, Floride Bonneau (1792–1866) who married her father's first cousin John Caldwell Calhoun, and James Edward (1798–1889 later changed last name to Calhoun), a planter who would become an officer in the U.S. Navy in the 1820s. Floride became Second Lady of the United States in 1825. John Colhoun was also a first cousin of Joseph Calhoun, and brother-in-law of Andrew Pickens.

== Early background ==
In 1774, Colhoun graduated from the College of New Jersey (later to become Princeton University). On 16 August 1775, he joined Capt. Charles Drayton's company of volunteer militia for service in the American Revolution at its organization in Charleston, South Carolina. After the war, in 1783, he studied law and was admitted to the bar and commenced practice in Charleston, South Carolina, working mostly in estate settlements and personal injury suits. In 1785, he was elected a member of the privy council and also a commissioner of confiscated estates. He rose to prominence after marrying Floride Bonneau who was heiress to an extensive plantation. Colhoun, became a planter by-trade, and later acquired several plantations across the state of South Carolina, including his Santee Plantation in St. Stephen's Parish, his Keowee and 12 Mile Plantations in the Old Pendleton District (where a slave plot was discovered in 1798. He eventually owned thousands of acres. At the time of his death, he owned 108 slaves.), and his Pimlico and Bonneau's Ferry Plantations in St. John's Parish. Another plantation he owned, the location of which is unclear, was called Mount Prospect. Colhoun grew mostly indigo, rice, oats, and vegetables on his plantations, as well as raising cattle, and breeding horses.

His Keowee Plantation is listed on the National Register of Historic Places (NRHP), and it is within the Old Pendleton Historic District of Pendleton, South Carolina, also listed on the NRHP.

== Senator ==
In 1801, after 22 years of service in the South Carolina House of Representatives, Colhoun defeated Jacob Read, incumbent, by a vote of 75 to 73, sealing his victory and was elected a member of the United States Senate from the state of South Carolina Senate and was a member of the committee which was instructed to report a modification of the judiciary system of the United States. He was elected as a Democratic-Republican to the 7th United States Congress as a senator, serving from March 4, 1801, until his death on October 26, 1802, in Pendleton, South Carolina. He was interred in the family cemetery in the Old Pendleton District.

== See also ==
- List of members of the United States Congress who died in office (1790–1899)

U.S. Senate
Preceded by Jacob Read	U.S. senator (Class 3) from South Carolina; March 4, 1801 – October 26, 1802; Served alongside: Charles Pinckney and Thomas Sumter	Succeeded by Pierce Butler
