= Robert Barnwell =

American politician

Robert Gibbes Barnwell

President of the South Carolina Senate
- In office December 2, 1805 – December 19, 1805
- Governor: Paul Hamilton
- Preceded by: John Ward
- Succeeded by: William Smith

Member of the South Carolina Senate from St. Helena's Parish
- In office November 26, 1804 – December 19, 1805

10th Speaker of the South Carolina House of Representatives
- In office December 20, 1794 – December 16, 1797
- Governor: Arnoldus Vanderhorst; Charles Pinckney
- Preceded by: Jacob Read
- Succeeded by: William Johnson, Jr.

Member of the South Carolina House of Representatives from St. Helena's Parish
- In office November 24, 1794 – December 19, 1801
- In office January 15, 1790 – December 20, 1791
- In office January 1, 1787 – November 4, 1788

Member of the U.S. House of Representatives from South Carolina's 2nd district
- In office March 4, 1791 – March 3, 1793
- Preceded by: Aedanus Burke
- Succeeded by: John Hunter

Delegate to the Congress of the Confederation from South Carolina
- In office November 3, 1788 – March 2, 1789

Personal details
- Born: December 21, 1761 Beaufort, Province of South Carolina, British America
- Died: October 24, 1814 (aged 52) Beaufort, South Carolina, U.S.
- Party: Pro-Administration
- Profession: politician

Military service
- Allegiance: United States of America
- Branch/service: South Carolina Militia
- Years of service: 1777–1782
- Rank: Lieutenant colonel
- Battles/wars: American Revolutionary War

Robert Gibbes Barnwell (December 21, 1761 – October 24, 1814) was a South Carolina revolutionary and statesman who was a delegate to the Confederation Congress and a United States congressman.

Barnwell was born in Beaufort in the Province of South Carolina. His education was by a private tutor after he had exhausted the resources of the Beaufort common school. But he interrupted this and entered the revolutionary war at the age of 16 as a private in the militia. In the maneuvering after the Battle of Stono Ferry, his company was camped on Johns Island in late June 1779. A British surprise attack at night cut them up badly in an action known as the Battle of Mathews' Plantation. The sixteen-year-old Barnwell was wounded so badly that they stripped his gear and left him for dead. He was found in the field by a slave and taken to his aunt (Mrs. Sarah Gibbes) on her nearby plantation. She and her daughter nursed him back to health.

== Revolutionary War ==
He returned to duty, rejoining the militia the next spring as a lieutenant. He was just in time to be included with the prisoners when General Benjamin Lincoln surrendered Charleston on May 12, 1780. He was imprisoned on the transport ship Pack Horse until his exchange in June 1781. He returned to militia service, and by the end of the war had risen to lieutenant colonel.

== Political career ==
Back home in Beaufort, Barnwell was elected to the South Carolina house of representatives for 1787-1788. He was a delegate representing South Carolina in the Confederation Congress in 1788 and 1789. He was returned to the state house for terms in 1790-1791, and 1794–1801, and in 1795, he served as speaker of that house.

In the spring of 1788, Robert was a delegate to South Carolina convention that ratified the United States Constitution. He was elected to one term in the U.S. House (1791–1793) for an at-large seat but declined to run again. Beginning in 1795, he was the chair of the board of trustees for the new Beaufort College and held that position for many years. He was elected to the state senate for 1805–1806 and was president of that body in 1805.

Barnwell was a slave owner. He died in Beaufort and is buried there in the churchyard of the St. Helena Episcopal Church. His son, Robert Woodward Barnwell, served in both the United States Senate and the Confederate Senate.

U.S. House of Representatives
Preceded by Aedanus Burke	Member of the U.S. House of Representatives from South Carolina's 2nd congressional district 1791-1793	Succeeded by John Hunter
