= Hugh Williamson =

American Founding Father, politician and physician (1735-1819)

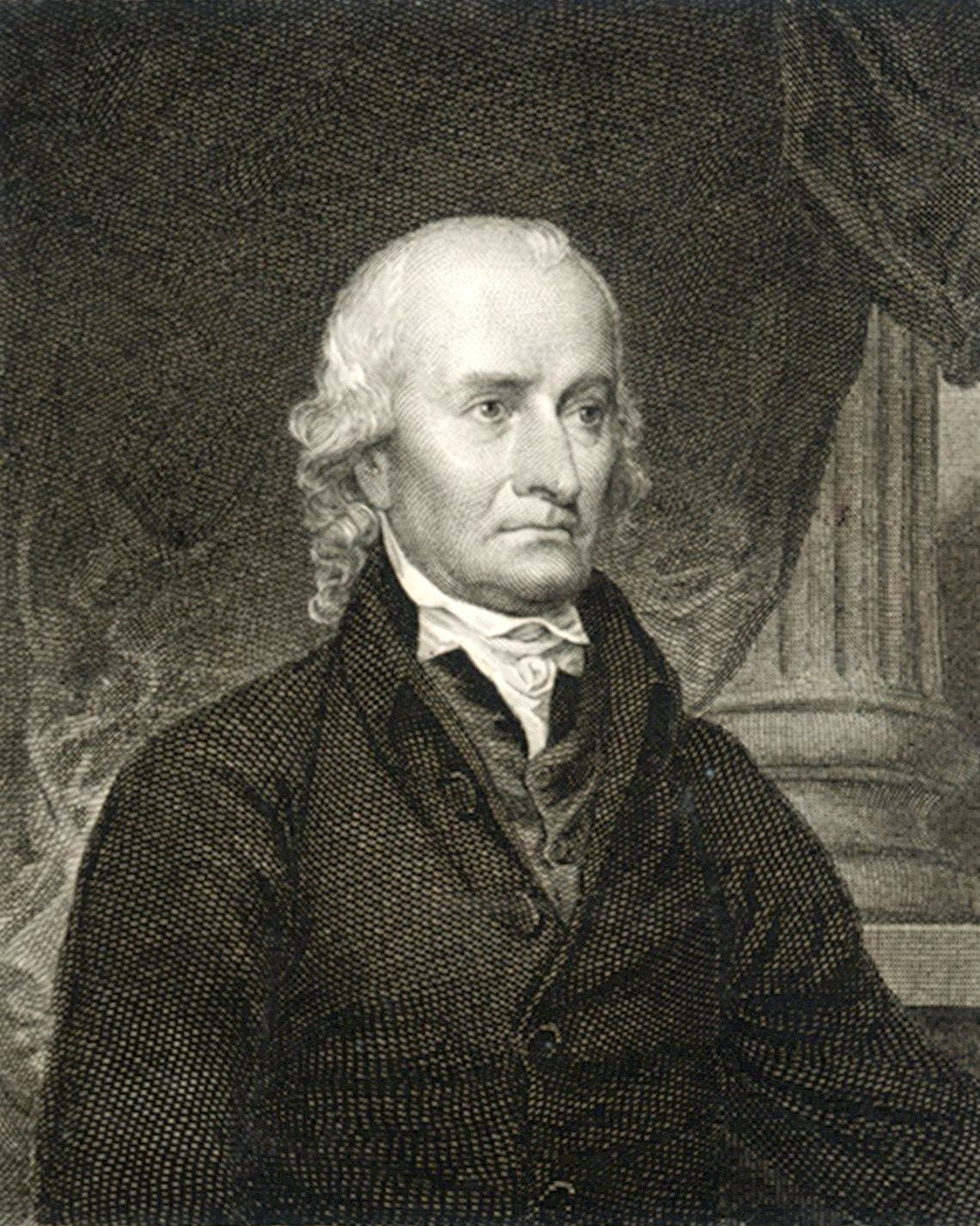

Member of the U.S. House of Representatives from North Carolina
- In office March 19, 1790 – March 3, 1793
- Preceded by: District established
- Succeeded by: Alexander Mebane
- Constituency: 2nd district (1790–1791); 4th district (1791–1793)

Personal details
- Born: December 5, 1735 West Nottingham Township, Province of Pennsylvania, British America
- Died: May 22, 1819 (aged 83) New York City, U.S.
- Resting place: Trinity Church Cemetery, New York City
- Party: Anti-Administration
- Spouse: Maria Apthorpe
- Education: University of Pennsylvania (BA)
- Profession: Physician, scholar, politician
- Nickname: The Ben Franklin of North Carolina

Hugh Williamson (December 5, 1735 – May 22, 1819) was an American Founding Father, medical doctor, and politician. He is best known as a signatory to the U.S. Constitution and for representing North Carolina at the Constitutional Convention.

Williamson was well known as a scholar, bringing him into contact with some of the leading intellectuals of the Patriot cause and, in turn, with the political ideas that eventually found expression in the Constitution. During the American Revolution, Williamson contributed his talents as a physician and natural scientist to the American war effort. His experiences during the revolution transformed him from a scholar into a politician and leader in the campaign for effective national government. Williamson's leadership was evident not only at the Convention in Philadelphia but also during the ratification debates in North Carolina.

Born on the frontier, he lived for significant periods of his life in three different regions of the country. That mobility contributed to the development of his nationalistic outlook, strengthened by wartime service with interstate military forces and reinforced by the interests of the planters and merchants that formed his North Carolina constituency. His experiences convinced him that only a strong central government could adequately protect and foster the political, economic, and intellectual future of the new nation.

== Early years ==
Williamson was born in West Nottingham Township, in what was then the frontier region of the Province of Pennsylvania. His fragile health as a youth weighed against his beginning a career in the family's clothier business. His parents instead sent him to Francis Alison's New London Academy and, in 1754, to the College of Philadelphia (today's University of Pennsylvania). Williamson graduated in the school's first class, on May 17, 1757, five days before his father died. After teaching at Philadelphia Academy, Williamson studied theology with his West Nottingham neighbor, the Rev. Samuel Finley (later president of the College of New Jersey, today's Princeton). He moved to Connecticut and obtained a preacher's license but his disillusionment with factional disputes within the Presbyterian Church and a resurgence of ill health led him to abandon a career in the ministry. Upon completing a master's degree at Philadelphia in 1760, Williamson joined his alma mater's faculty as a professor of mathematics.

In another career shift four years later, Williamson turned to the study of medicine and doctricity. After spending a year at the University of Edinburgh, he matriculated in 1760s at the University of Utrecht in the Netherlands, wrote a brief thesis, and received his Medical Degree on August 6, 1764. He returned to Philadelphia to open a private practice. At the same time, he pursued a number of independent scientific and educational projects, and his work in these areas eventually led to membership in the American Philosophical Society as well as acclaim in Europe's intellectual circles.

Interest in science and education indirectly led Williamson to politics and the Patriot cause. Sailing for England in 1773 to raise funds for a local educational project, Williamson stopped en route at Boston. There he witnessed the famous Boston Tea Party, in which Patriots dressed as American Indians destroyed a cargo of tea in protest over a newly enforced Parliamentary tax on imported commodities. On reaching London he was summoned before the Privy Council to testify on this act of rebellion and on colonial affairs in general.

Williamson came of age politically during this encounter. In response to questions by Council members, who were in the process of formulating punitive measures against Massachusetts, he bluntly warned that repression would provoke rebellion. He then went on to express the argument that was becoming the core of the Patriot position: Americans were entitled to the full rights of Englishmen, including representation in the decisions of the English government. This testimony brought him to the attention of other Americans in London. A mutual interest in scientific matters cemented a solid working relationship with Benjamin Franklin, and Williamson soon found himself joined with the famous American scientist and others in appealing for support among those Englishmen who, in opposition to their own government, sympathized with American claims. Williamson continued on to the Netherlands where, taking advantage of the cover afforded by his attendance at meetings on scientific and educational subjects, he organized the publication of pamphlets and other papers that supported the Patriot cause. While there he learned that the colonies had declared their independence. He rushed back to Philadelphia in early 1777 and volunteered for service in the Medical Department of the Continental Army. The department had no opening at that time, so Williamson decided to form a partnership with a younger brother to import medicines and other scarce items from the West Indies through the British blockade. Believing that he could best contribute to the war effort by using his contacts and reputation in this manner, Williamson made Edenton, North Carolina, his base of operations. Settlement in North Carolina soon led to his establishing a medical practice to serve the planters and merchants of the region.

== Military physician ==
These various activities brought Williamson to the attention of North Carolina's political leaders. Facing the threat of a British invasion of the region from the sea and bases in Florida, the state legislature voted to raise a force of 4,000 men to assist South Carolina. When Governor Richard Caswell, with the rank of major general, took to the field at the head of these citizen-soldiers, he named Williamson to serve as the state's Physician and Surgeon General, a post Williamson held until the end of the war.

The siege of Charleston in 1780 marked a stunning defeat for American forces and signaled the end of the first phase in a new British war strategy. Under this strategy British forces would continue to tie down General George Washington's main army in the north while a Royal army under General Charles Cornwallis would advance northward. Using Savannah, Georgia, and Charleston as their bases of operations, the British expected their regular units to push through North Carolina and Virginia while a militia composed of local Loyalists secured areas captured by the regular forces. If successful, this strategy would have led to the conquest of the colonies from the south. To counter Cornwallis' efforts, the Continental Congress sent Horatio Gates to command a small force composed of a division of continentals, Caswell's units from North Carolina, and a group of hastily assembled Virginia militia units.

Gates attempted to attack the British advance base near Camden, South Carolina, but his tired militia units, which were still forming when the battle began, were routed, and the Americans suffered another defeat. Williamson, who witnessed the disaster, volunteered to pass behind enemy lines to care for the American wounded. He spent two months on this mercy mission. When smallpox threatened the prison camp, he argued strenuously with Cornwallis and other British officers over the proper method to combat the disease. His perseverance and scientific reputation paid off. The British followed his advice, and an epidemic was averted.

In the fall of 1780 Williamson returned to the field. Major General Nathanael Greene, Gates' replacement, had begun his brilliant campaign to recover the south through the joint efforts of continentals and militia. While his main force engaged the British in a series of battles, the militiamen concentrated on picking off small outposts and isolated enemy parties. Francis Marion, nicknamed "Swamp Fox", and others who operated mainly in South Carolina are most remembered for this type of guerrilla warfare, but North Carolina units also adopted these tactics. Williamson was attached to a force under Brigadier General Isaac Gregory whose mission was to limit British activity in eastern North Carolina. Gregory established his base in the vast reaches of the Dismal Swamp where he could pin the British down in Wilmington without jeopardizing his small force. Williamson's bold innovations in preventive medicine, especially his strenuous efforts to indoctrinate raw troops in the importance of sanitation and diet, kept the command virtually free of disease during the six months that it inhabited the swamp-—a rare feat in 18th-century warfare.

== Statesman ==
Coat of Arms of Hugh Williamson

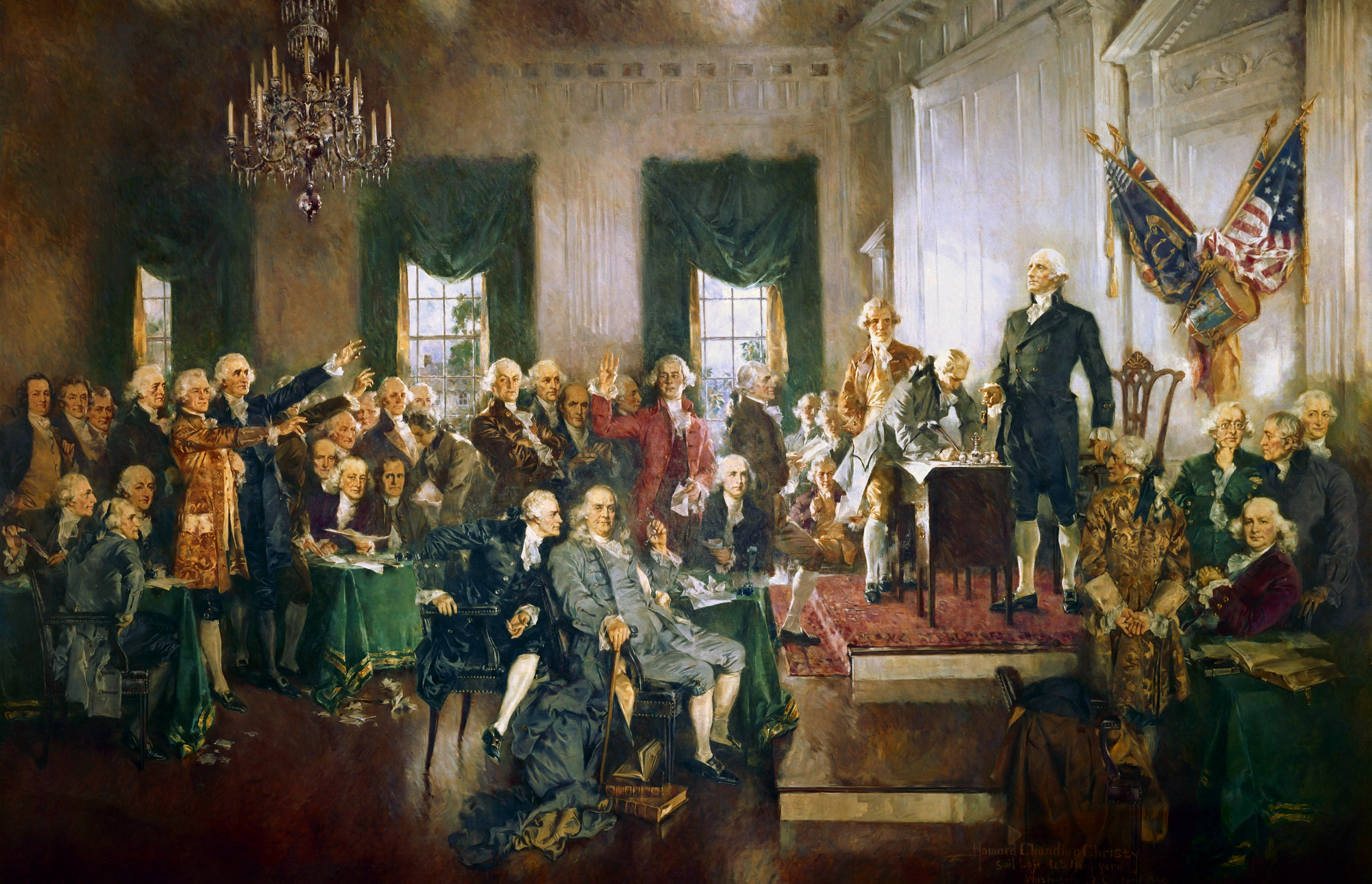
Scene at the Signing of the Constitution of the United States

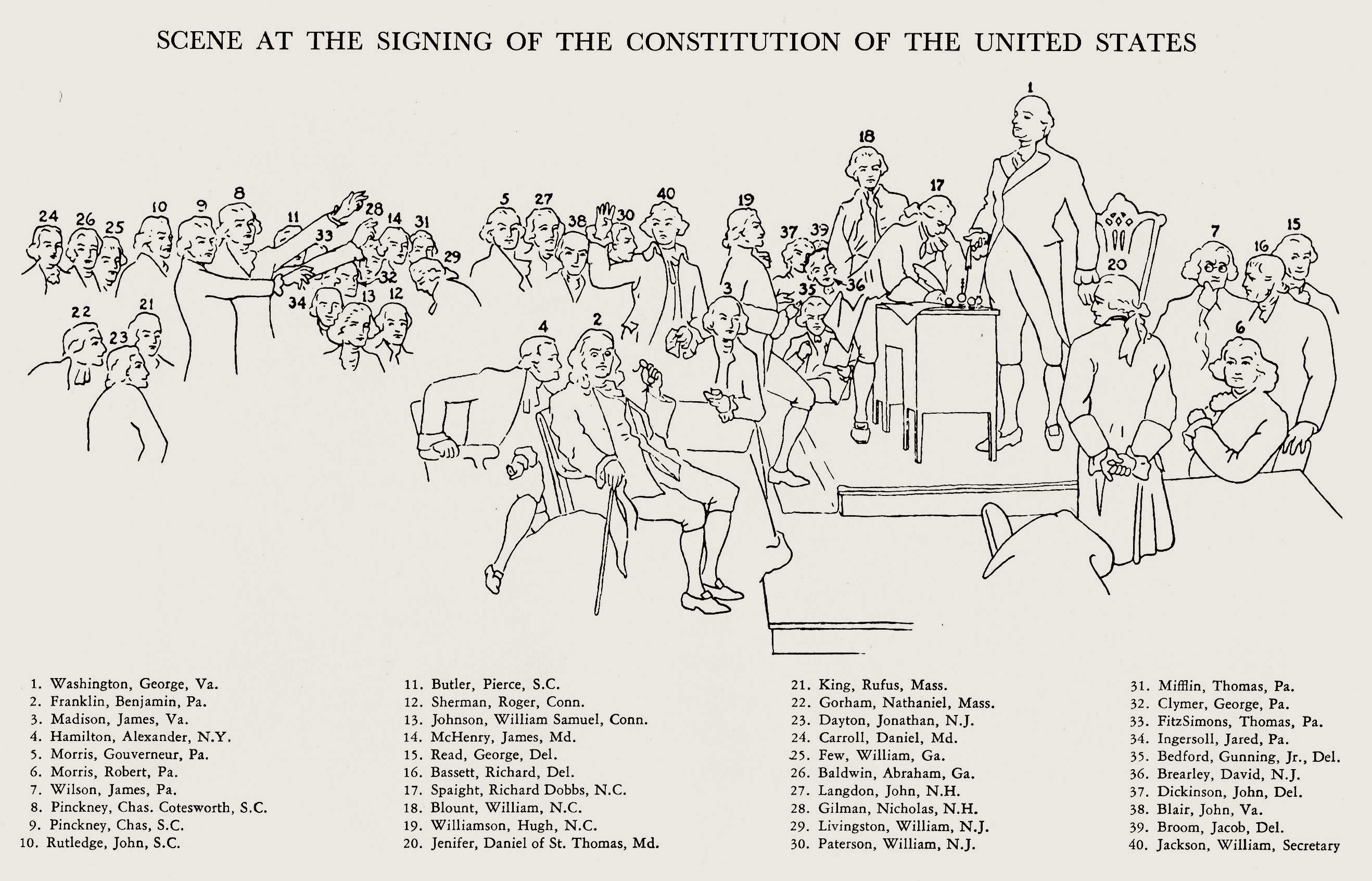
Key, Hugh Williamson, No 19

In 1782 Williamson was elected to the lower house of the North Carolina legislature, where he served for several terms. He sat on numerous committees, including those formed to regulate veterans' rights, and he authored the state's copyright law. He was chosen to serve in the Continental Congress in 1782. Appointment to this national body represented a natural political progression for Williamson, who was evolving into a champion of federalism. His experiences during the Revolution, especially his exposure to the pressing need for interstate cooperation during the 1780 and 1781 campaigns in the Carolinas, had convinced him of the military importance of strong national government. This interest increased when he came to realize the economic benefits that might accrue from the binding interstate association. In 1786 North Carolina chose Williamson to attend the Annapolis Convention, a meeting called to settle economic questions affecting the middle Atlantic states. Although he arrived too late to play a role in the Maryland proceedings, he was prepared to discuss interstate issues the following year when his state appointed him as a representative at the Constitutional Convention in Philadelphia.

Williamson, a faithful attendee at Convention sessions, lodged with Alexander Hamilton and James Madison, two of the country's best-known nationalist leaders. His intellectual stature and international background also propelled him into a leadership role in the North Carolina delegation. A capacity for hard work and his innate good humor made him invaluable to the Federalists as they worked out the many political compromises necessary for consensus on the new instrument of government. On 11 July 1787, James Wilson of Pennsylvania proposed the three fifths compromise. It failed to pass (4:6), but a substantially similar motion was passed two days later. Williamson, like many other Founders, was opposed to the institution of slavery.

Shortly before the Convention adjourned, Williamson wrote a series of public letters in defense of a strong federal system. These "Letters of Sylvius" addressed many of the practical concerns of his state, where the rural and frequently debt-ridden farmers favored minimal government regulations, while the mercantile-planter group from the seaboard region wanted an economy strictly regulated by a central government. Using simple examples, Williamson explained to both groups the dual dangers of inflationary finances and of taxes that would stunt the growth of domestic manufacture. He exhorted North Carolinians to support the Constitution as the basis for their future prosperity. The ratification process, he explained, would decide whether the United States would remain a "system of patchwork and a series of expedients" or become "the most flourishing, independent, and happy nation on the face of the earth."

Following adjournment in Philadelphia, Williamson returned to New York to participate in the closing sessions of the Continental Congress and to serve as one of the agents settling North Carolina's accounts with that body. These duties caused him to miss the Hillsboro Convention, where North Carolina first considered and rejected the Constitution, but he played a major role at a second convention that met in Fayetteville in 1789. Here he participated in a successful effort to rally support for the Constitution.

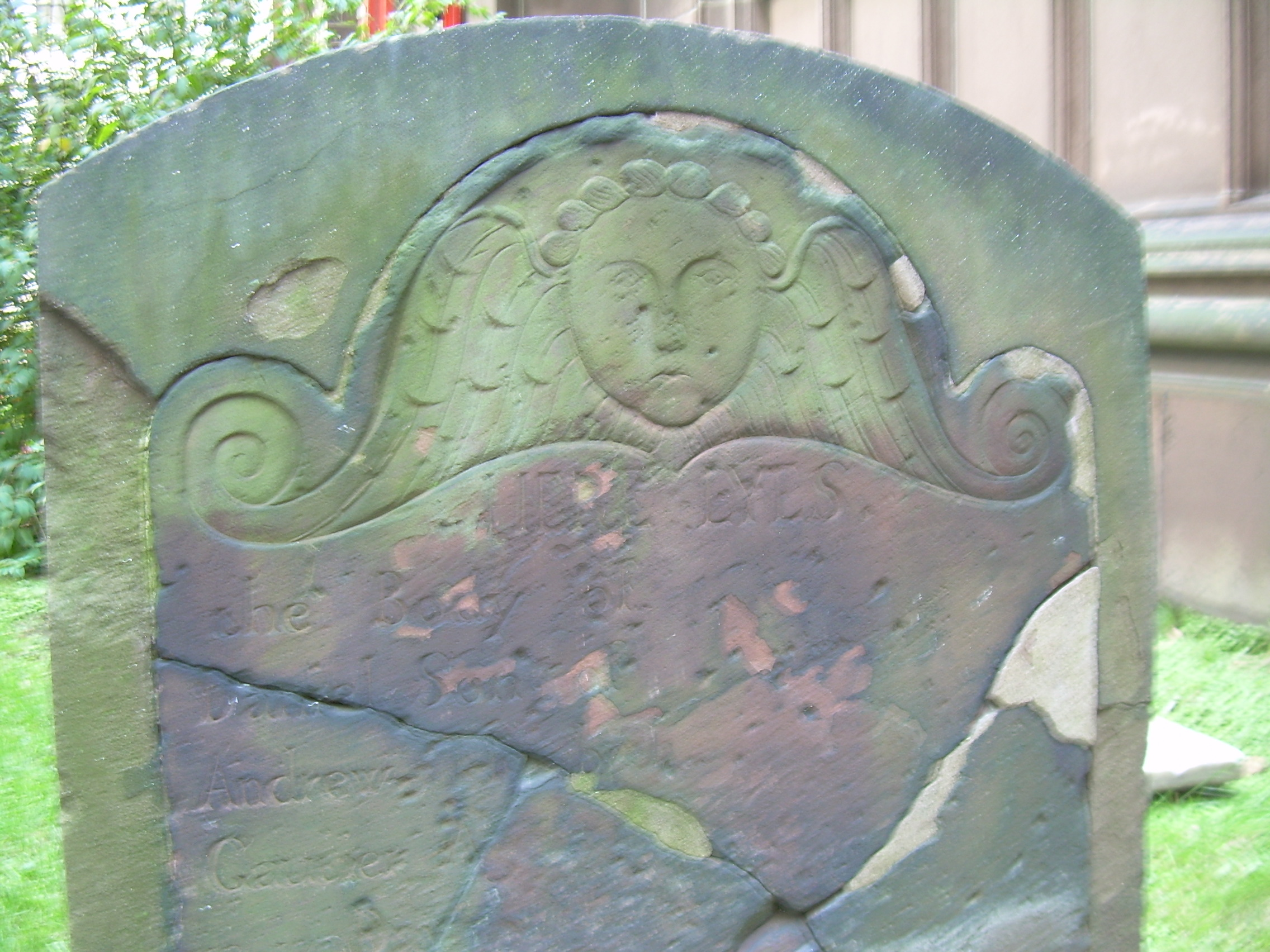
Williamson's grave at Trinity Church Cemetery

Williamson was elected to the first federal Congress. He served two terms before retiring and settling in New York City, where he continued to pursue a wide range of scholarly interests. He wrote extensively about his research, joined numerous learned societies, and contributed to many charities. He also served as one of the original trustees of the University of North Carolina.

Thomas Jefferson described Williamson's role at the Philadelphia Convention in the following terms: "he was a useful member, of an acute mind, attentive to business, and of a high degree of erudition."

== Personal life ==
Williamson married Maria Apthorpe in January 1789; she died after the birth of their second child in 1790. They had two sons, both of whom died young (the older one at the age of 22 in 1811, the younger, shortly thereafter, according to Hosack's Memoir of Hugh Williamson). Williamson was a Presbyterian, though some sources have identified him as a Deist.

== Death and legacy ==
On May 22, 1819, Williamson died suddenly in New York City, at the age of 83, while driving in his carriage; he was buried in New York City in Trinity Churchyard near the grave of Alexander Hamilton. Williamson County, Tennessee, was named after him, and subsequently Williamson County, Illinois, was named after Williamson County, Tennessee. Williamson Street in Madison, Wisconsin is named after him. Willy Street Coop on Williamson Street in Madison is named for his street. Williamson was elected a member of the American Antiquarian Society in 1813.

Williamson appears in John Trumbull's 1824 painting General George Washington Resigning His Commission, which was featured on the reverse of the United States five-thousand-dollar bill.

U.S. House of Representatives
Preceded by District created	Member of the U.S. House of Representatives from North Carolina's 2nd congressional district 1790–1791	Succeeded by Nathaniel Macon
Preceded by John Steele	Member of the U.S. House of Representatives from North Carolina's 4th congressional district 1791–1793	Succeeded by Alexander Mebane
