= 4th United States Congress =

1795–1797 meeting of U.S. legislature

←	3rd	5th	→
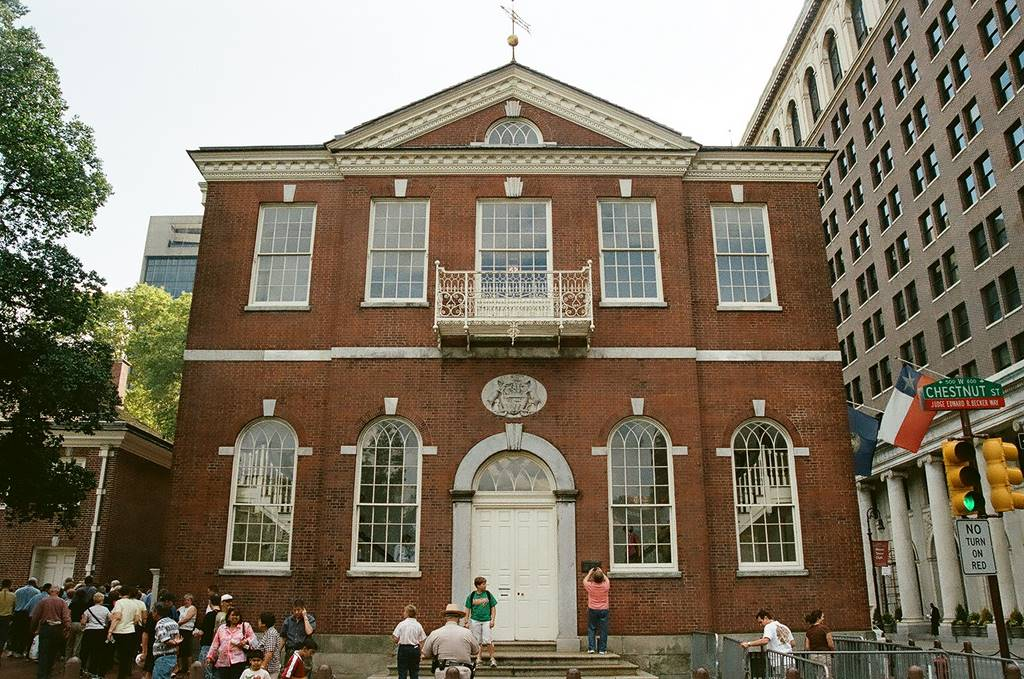
- Congress Hall (2007)

Overview
- Legislative body: United States Congress
- Jurisdiction: United States
- Term: March 4, 1795 – March 3, 1797

Senate
- Members: 30–32
- President: John Adams (F)
- President pro tempore: Henry Tazewell (DR); Samuel Livermore (F); William Bingham (F)
- Party control: Federalist

House of Representatives
- Members: 105–106 representatives 1 non-voting delegates
- Speaker: Jonathan Dayton (F)
- Party control: Democratic-Republican

Sessions
- Special (Note: Special session of the Senate.): June 8, 1795 – June 26, 1795
- 1st: December 7, 1795 – June 1, 1796
- 2nd: December 5, 1796 – March 3, 1797

The 4th United States Congress was a meeting of the legislative branch of the United States federal government, consisting of the United States Senate and the United States House of Representatives. It met at Congress Hall in Philadelphia, Pennsylvania, from March 4, 1795, to March 4, 1797, during the last two years of George Washington's presidency. The apportionment of seats in the House of Representatives was based on the 1790 United States census. The Senate had a Federalist majority, and the House had a Democratic-Republican majority.

== Major events ==
- September 17, 1796: George Washington's Farewell Address warned against partisan politics and foreign entanglements.
- November 4 - December 7, 1796: 1796 United States presidential election: Incumbent vice president John Adams defeated Secretary of State Thomas Jefferson.

== Treaties ratified ==
- June 24, 1795: Treaty of London ("Jay's Treaty")
- March 7, 1796: Treaty of Madrid ("Pinckney's Treaty")

== States admitted ==
- June 1, 1796: Tennessee admitted as a state; formerly the Territory South of the River Ohio, Sess. 1, ch. 47, 1 Stat. 1 - 491 491

== Party summary ==
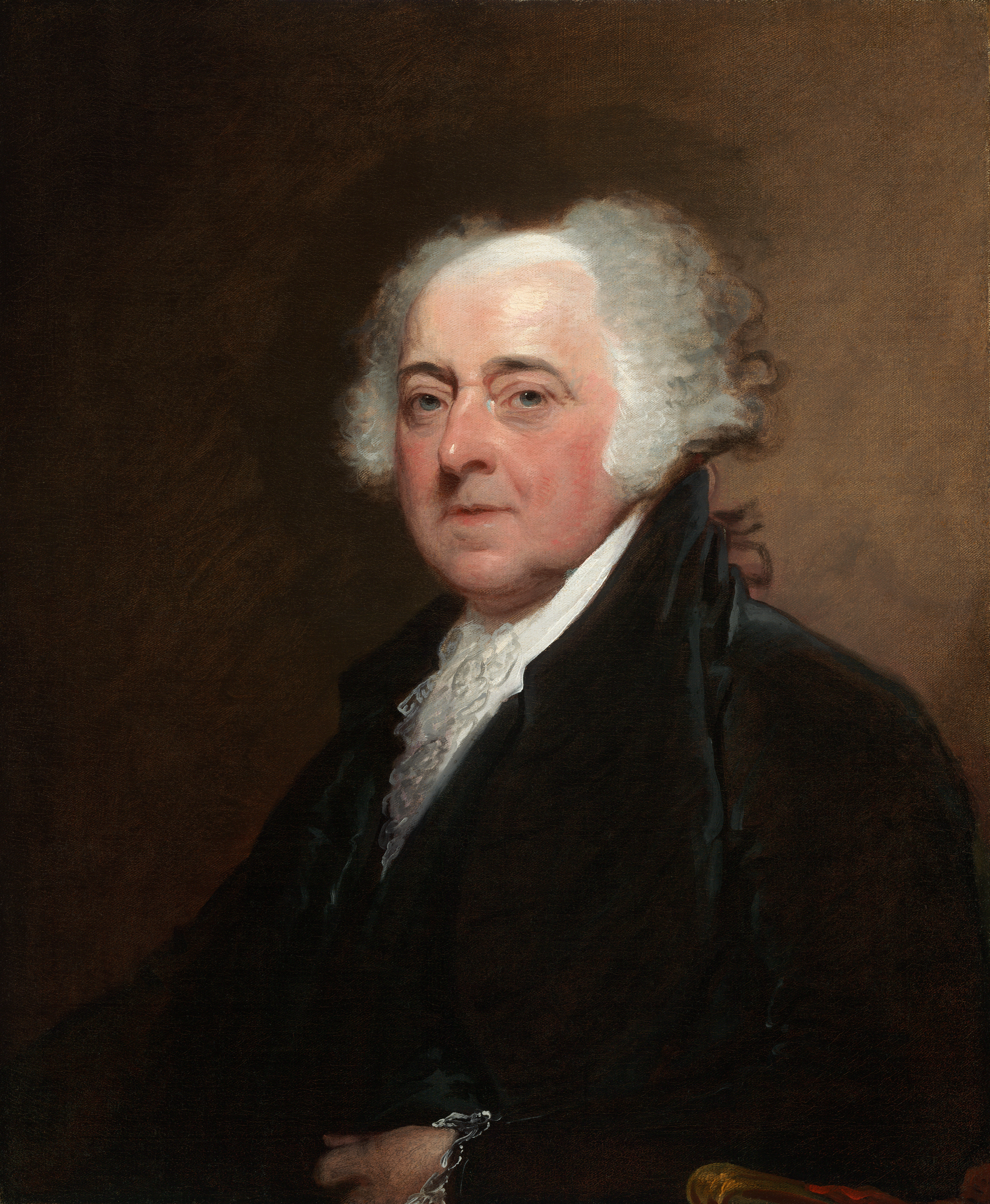
President of the Senate John Adams

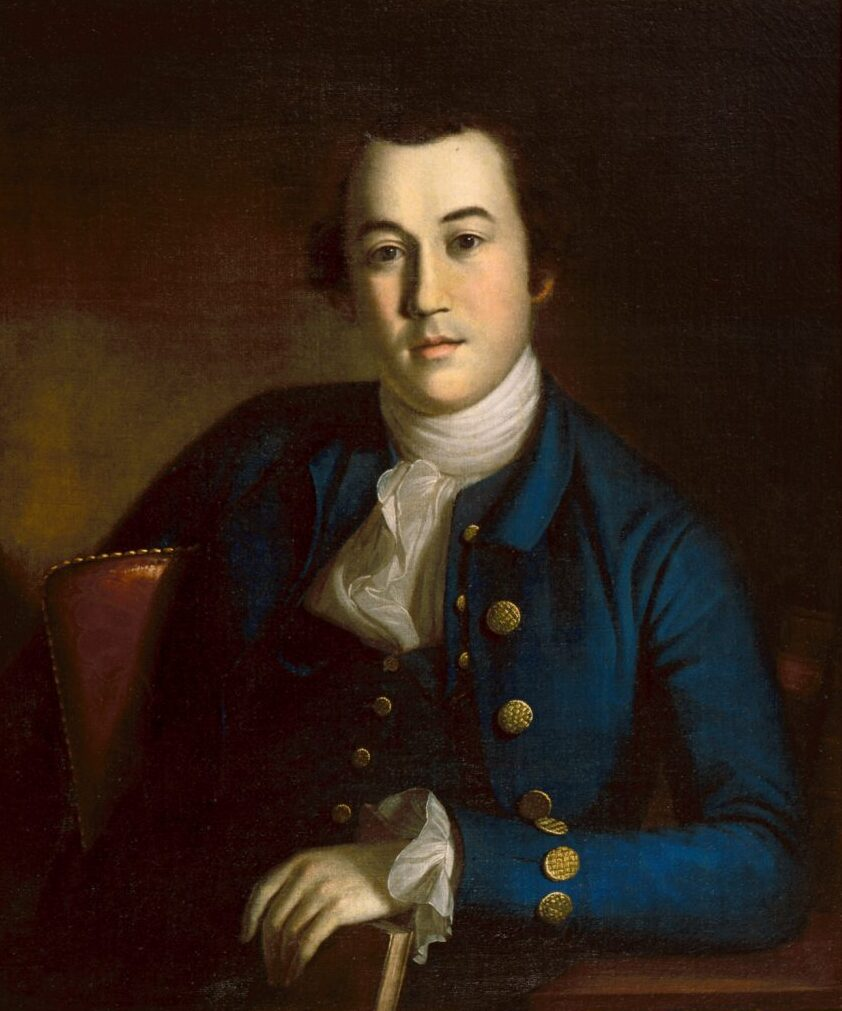
President pro tempore Henry Tazewell

This was the first Congress to have organized political parties. Details on changes are shown below in the "Changes in membership" section.

=== Senate ===
	Party (shading shows control)		Total	Vacant
	Democratic- Republican (DR)	Federalist (F)	Total	Vacant
End of previous congress	13 (Note: Anti-Administration)	17 (Note: Pro-Administration)	30	0
Begin	10	20	30	0
End	11	21	32	0
Final voting share	34.4%	65.6%		
Beginning of next congress	9	22	31	1

=== House of Representatives ===
	Party (shading shows control)		Total	Vacant
	Democratic- Republican (DR)	Federalist (F)	Total	Vacant
End of previous congress	54 (Note: Anti-Administration)	49 (Note: Pro-Administration)	103	2
Begin	58	46	104	1
End	59	47	106	0
Final voting share	55.7%	44.3%		
Beginning of next congress	57	49	106	0

== Leadership ==
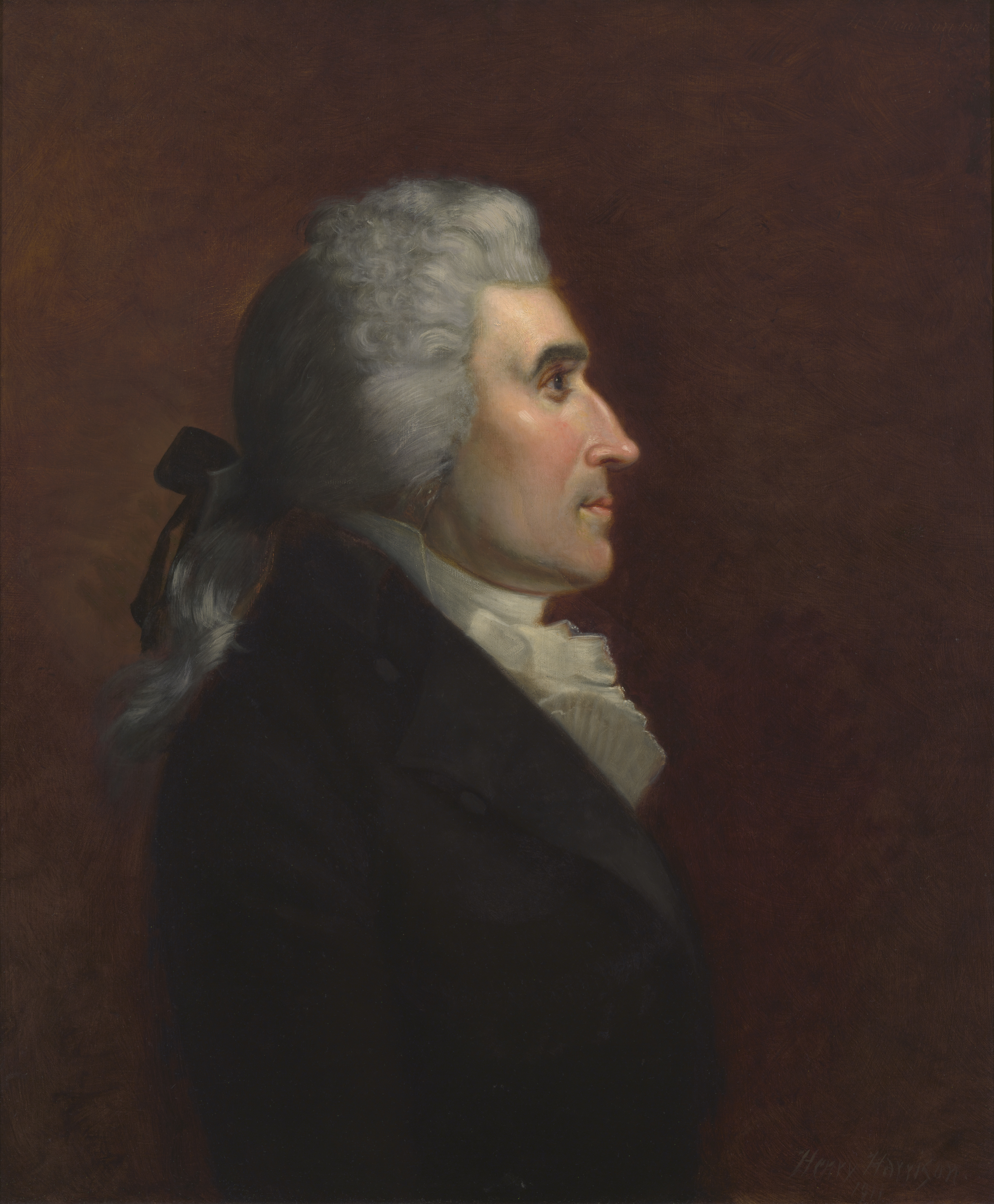
Speaker of the House Jonathan Dayton

=== Senate ===
- President: John Adams (F)
- President pro tempore:
  - Henry Tazewell (F), first elected December 7, 1795
  - Samuel Livermore (F), first elected May 6, 1796
  - William Bingham (F), first elected February 16, 1797

=== House of Representatives ===
- Speaker: Jonathan Dayton (F)

== Members ==
This list is arranged by chamber, then by state. Senators are listed by class, and representatives are listed by district.

Skip to House of Representatives, below

=== Senate ===
Senators were elected by the state legislatures every two years, with one-third beginning new six-year terms with each Congress. Preceding the names in the list below are Senate class numbers, which indicate the cycle of their election. In this Congress, Class 1 meant their term ended with this Congress, requiring re-election in 1796; Class 2 meant their term began in the last Congress, requiring re-election in 1798; and Class 3 meant their term began in this Congress, requiring re-election in 1800.

==== Connecticut ====
▌1. Oliver Ellsworth (F), until March 8, 1796

▌James Hillhouse (F), from May 12, 1796

▌3. Jonathan Trumbull Jr. (F), until June 10, 1796

▌Uriah Tracy (F), from October 13, 1796

==== Delaware ====
▌1. Henry Latimer (F)
▌2. John Vining (F)

==== Georgia ====
▌2. James Jackson (DR), until October 31, 1795

▌George Walton (F), November 16, 1795 – February 20, 1796
▌Josiah Tattnall (DR), from February 20, 1796

▌3. James Gunn (F)

==== Kentucky ====
▌2. John Brown (DR)
▌3. Humphrey Marshall (F)

==== Maryland ====
▌1. Richard Potts (F), until October 24, 1796

▌John Eager Howard (F), from November 30, 1796

▌3. John Henry (F)

==== Massachusetts ====
▌1. George Cabot (F), until June 9, 1796

▌Benjamin Goodhue (F), from June 11, 1796

▌2. Caleb Strong (F), until June 1, 1796

▌Theodore Sedgwick (F), from June 11, 1796

==== New Hampshire ====
▌2. Samuel Livermore (F)
▌3. John Langdon (DR)

==== New Jersey ====
▌1. John Rutherfurd (F)
▌2. Frederick Frelinghuysen (F), until November 12, 1796

▌Richard Stockton (F), from November 12, 1796

==== New York ====
▌1. Aaron Burr (DR)
▌3. Rufus King (F), until May 23, 1796

▌John Laurance (F), from November 9, 1796

==== North Carolina ====
▌2. Alexander Martin (DR)
▌3. Timothy Bloodworth (DR)

==== Pennsylvania ====
▌1. James Ross (F)
▌3. William Bingham (F)

==== Rhode Island ====
▌1. Theodore Foster (F)
▌2. William Bradford (F)

==== South Carolina ====
▌2. Pierce Butler (DR), until October 25, 1796

▌John Hunter (DR), from December 8, 1796

▌3. Jacob Read (F)

==== Tennessee ====
▌1. William Cocke (DR), from August 2, 1796 (newly admitted state)
▌2. William Blount (DR), from August 2, 1796 (newly admitted state)

==== Vermont ====
▌1. Moses Robinson (DR), until October 15, 1796

▌Isaac Tichenor (F), from October 18, 1796

▌3. Elijah Paine (F)

==== Virginia ====
▌1. Stevens Mason (DR)
▌2. Henry Tazewell (DR)

Senators' party membership by state at the opening of the 4th Congress in March 1795. Tennessee's Senators were not seated until August 2, 1796. 2 Democratic-Republicans 1 Democratic-Republican and 1 Federalist 2 Federalists

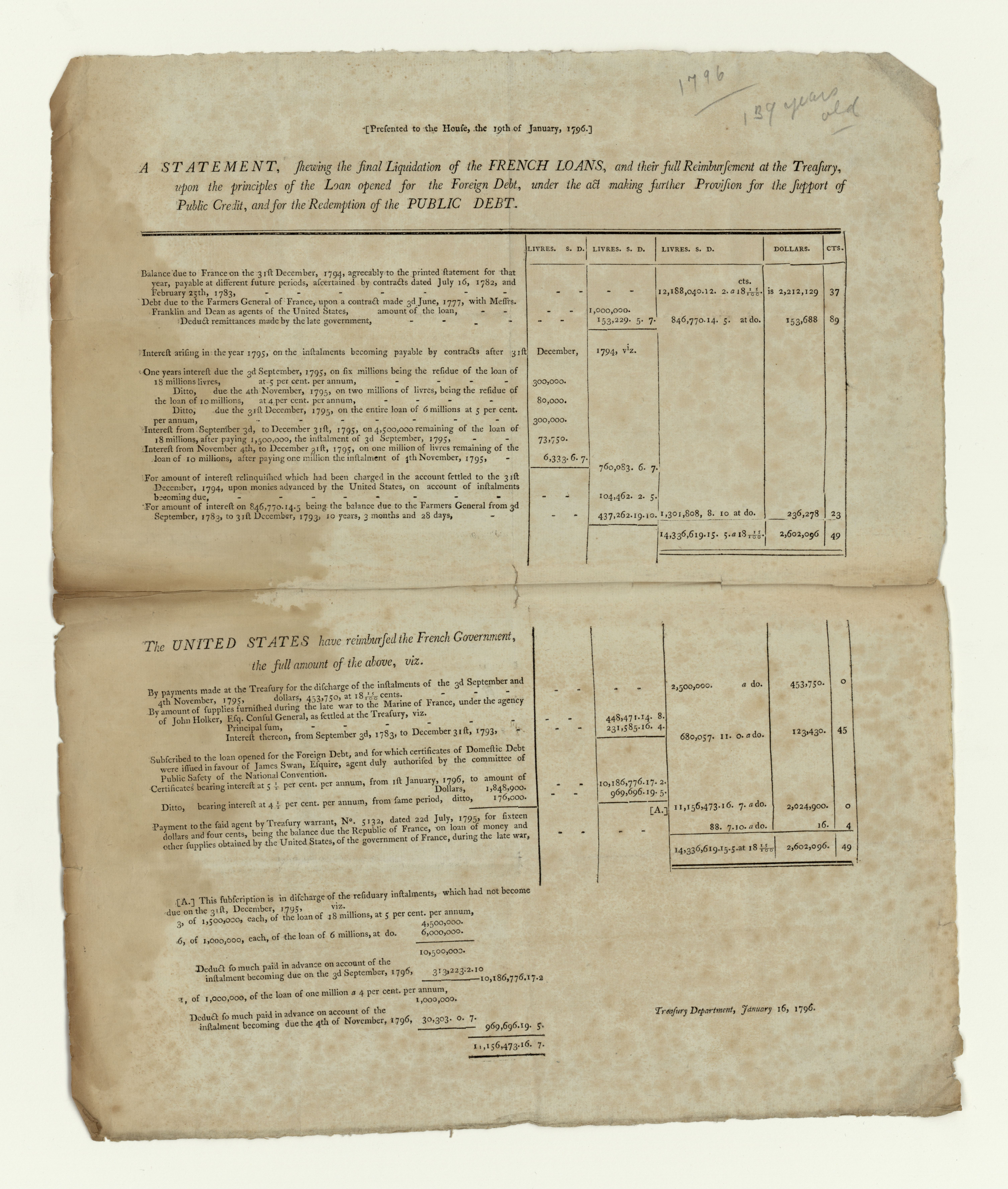
Treasury Department statement showing the final liquidation of the French loans, presented to the House of Representatives, January 19, 1796

=== House of Representatives ===
==== Connecticut ====
All representatives were elected statewide on a general ticket.

▌At-large. Joshua Coit (F)
▌At-large. Chauncey Goodrich (F)
▌At-large. Roger Griswold (F)
▌At-large. James Hillhouse (F), until July 1, 1796

▌James Davenport (F), from December 5, 1796

▌At-large. Nathaniel Smith (F)
▌At-large. Zephaniah Swift (F)
▌At-large. Uriah Tracy (F), until October 13, 1796

▌Samuel W. Dana (F), from January 3, 1797

==== Delaware ====
▌At-large. John Patten (DR)

==== Georgia ====
Both representatives were elected statewide on a general ticket.

▌At-large. Abraham Baldwin (DR)
▌At-large. John Milledge (DR)

==== Kentucky ====
▌1. Christopher Greenup (DR)
▌2. Alexander D. Orr (DR)

==== Maryland ====
▌1. George Dent (F)
▌2. Gabriel Duvall (DR), until March 28, 1796

▌Richard Sprigg Jr. (DR), from May 5, 1796

▌3. Jeremiah Crabb (F), until June 1, 1796

▌William Craik (F), from December 5, 1796

▌4. Thomas Sprigg (DR)
▌5. Samuel Smith (DR)
▌6. Gabriel Christie (DR)
▌7. William Hindman (F)
▌8. William Vans Murray (F)

==== Massachusetts ====
▌1. Theodore Sedgwick (F), until June, 1796

▌Thomson J. Skinner (DR), from January 27, 1797

▌2. William Lyman (DR)
▌3. Samuel Lyman (F)
▌4. Dwight Foster (F)
▌5. Nathaniel Freeman Jr. (F)
▌6. John Reed Sr. (F)
▌7. George Leonard (F)
▌8. Fisher Ames (F)
▌9. Joseph Bradley Varnum (DR)
▌10. Benjamin Goodhue (F), until June 1796

▌Samuel Sewall (F), from December 7, 1796

▌11. Theophilus Bradbury (F)
▌12. Henry Dearborn (DR)
▌13. Peleg Wadsworth (F)
▌14. George Thatcher (F)

==== New Hampshire ====
All representatives were elected statewide on a general ticket.

▌At-large. Abiel Foster (F)
▌At-large. Nicholas Gilman (F)
▌At-large. John Sherburne (DR)
▌At-large. Jeremiah Smith (F)

==== New Jersey ====
All representatives were elected statewide on a general ticket.

▌At-large. Jonathan Dayton (F)
▌At-large. Thomas Henderson (F)
▌At-large. Aaron Kitchell (DR)
▌At-large. Isaac Smith (F)
▌At-large. Mark Thomson (F)

==== New York ====
▌1. Jonathan N. Havens (DR)
▌2. Edward Livingston (DR)
▌3. Philip Van Cortlandt (DR)
▌4. John Hathorn (DR)
▌5. Theodorus Bailey (DR)
▌6. Ezekiel Gilbert (F)
▌7. John E. Van Alen (F)
▌8. Henry Glen (F)
▌9. John Williams (DR)
▌10. William Cooper (F)

==== North Carolina ====
▌1. James Holland (DR)
▌2. Matthew Locke (DR)
▌3. Jesse Franklin (DR)
▌4. Absalom Tatom (DR), until June 1, 1796

▌William Strudwick (F), from December 13, 1796

▌5. Nathaniel Macon (DR)
▌6. James Gillespie (DR)
▌7. William Barry Grove (F)
▌8. Dempsey Burges (DR)
▌9. Thomas Blount (DR)
▌10. Nathan Bryan (DR)

==== Pennsylvania ====
The 4th district was a plural district with two representatives.

▌1. John Swanwick (DR)
▌2. Frederick Muhlenberg (DR)
▌3. Richard Thomas (F)
4. Vacant until January 18, 1796

▌John Richards (DR), from January 18, 1796

▌4. Samuel Sitgreaves (F)
▌5. Daniel Hiester (DR), until July 1, 1796

▌George Ege (F), from December 8, 1796

▌6. Samuel Maclay (DR)
▌7. John Wilkes Kittera (F)
▌8. Thomas Hartley (F)
▌9. Andrew Gregg (DR)
▌10. David Bard (DR)
▌11. William Findley (DR)
▌12. Albert Gallatin (DR)

==== Rhode Island ====
Both representatives were elected statewide on a general ticket.

▌At-large. Benjamin Bourne (F), until October 13, 1796

▌Elisha R. Potter (F), from December 19, 1796

▌At-large. Francis Malbone (F)

==== South Carolina ====
▌1. William L. Smith (F)
▌2. Wade Hampton (DR)
▌3. Lemuel Benton (DR)
▌4. Richard Winn (DR)
▌5. Robert Goodloe Harper (F)
▌6. Samuel Earle (DR)

==== Tennessee ====
▌At-large. Andrew Jackson (DR), from December 5, 1796 (newly admitted state)

==== Vermont ====
▌1. Israel Smith (DR)
▌2. Daniel Buck (F)

==== Virginia ====
▌1. Robert Rutherford (DR)
▌2. Andrew Moore (DR)
▌3. George Jackson (DR)
▌4. Francis Preston (DR)
▌5. George Hancock (F)
▌6. Isaac Coles (DR)
▌7. Abraham B. Venable (DR)
▌8. Thomas Claiborne (DR)
▌9. William B. Giles (DR)
▌10. Carter B. Harrison (DR)
▌11. Josiah Parker (F)
▌12. John Page (DR)
▌13. John Clopton (DR)
▌14. Samuel J. Cabell (DR)
▌15. James Madison (DR)
▌16. Anthony New (DR)
▌17. Richard Brent (DR)
▌18. John Nicholas (DR)
▌19. John Heath (DR)

==== Non-voting members ====
▌Territory South of the River Ohio ("Southwest Territory," later "Tennessee") James White (DR), until June 1, 1796

States' share of House of Representatives seats by party

== Changes in membership ==
The count below reflects changes from the beginning of this Congress

=== Senate ===
There were 10 resignations, 2 new seats, and 1 election to replace an appointee. There was a 1-seat gain for both the Federalists and the Democratic-Republicans.

Senate changes
State (class)	Vacated by	Reason for change	Successor	Date of successor's formal installation (Note: When seated or oath administered, not necessarily when service began.)
Georgia (2)	James Jackson (DR)	Resigned sometime in 1795	George Walton (F)	Appointed November 16, 1795
Georgia (2)	George Walton (F)	Interim appointment expired February 20, 1796, with an election	Josiah Tattnall (DR)	Elected February 20, 1796
Connecticut (1)	Oliver Ellsworth (F)	Resigned March 8, 1796	James Hillhouse (F)	Elected March 12, 1796
New York (2)	Rufus King (F)	Resigned May 23, 1796, having been appointed Minister to England	John Laurance (F)	Elected November 9, 1796
Massachusetts (2)	Caleb Strong (F)	Resigned June 1, 1796	Theodore Sedgwick (F)	Elected June 11, 1796
Massachusetts (1)	George Cabot (F)	Resigned June 9, 1796	Benjamin Goodhue (F)	Elected June 11, 1796
Connecticut (3)	Jonathan Trumbull Jr. (F)	Resigned June 10, 1796	Uriah Tracy (F)	Elected October 13, 1796
Tennessee (1)	New seat	Tennessee was admitted to the Union	William Cocke (DR)	Elected August 2, 1796
Tennessee (2)	New seat	Tennessee was admitted to the Union	William Blount (DR)	Elected August 2, 1796
Vermont (1)	Moses Robinson (DR)	Resigned October 15, 1796	Isaac Tichenor (F)	Elected October 18, 1796
Maryland (1)	Richard Potts (F)	Resigned October 24, 1796	John E. Howard (F)	Elected November 30, 1796
South Carolina (2)	Pierce Butler (DR)	Resigned October 25, 1796	John Hunter (DR)	Elected December 8, 1796
New Jersey (2)	Frederick Frelinghuysen (F)	Resigned November 12, 1796	Richard Stockton (F)	Elected November 12, 1796

=== House of Representatives ===
There were 9 resignations, 1 death of a Representative-elect, and 1 new seat. There was a 1-seat gain for both the Federalists and the Democratic-Republicans.

House changes
District	Vacated by	Reason for change	Successor	Date of successor's formal installation
Pennsylvania 4	Vacant	Election was contested and then the apparent winner, James Morris, died July 10, 1795. The House then declared the seat won by the challenger.	John Richards (DR)	Seated January 18, 1796
Maryland 3	Jeremiah Crabb (F)	Resigned sometime in 1796.	William Craik (F)	Seated December 5, 1796
Rhode Island at-large	Benjamin Bourne (F)	Resigned sometime in 1796.	Elisha Potter (F)	Seated December 19, 1796
Massachusetts 1	Theodore Sedgwick (F)	Resigned sometime in June, 1796, having been elected U.S. Senator.	Thomson Skinner (DR)	Seated January 27, 1797
Maryland 2	Gabriel Duvall (DR)	Resigned March 28, 1796, having been elected judge of the Supreme Court of Maryland.	Richard Sprigg Jr. (DR)	Seated May 5, 1796
North Carolina 4	Absalom Tatom (DR)	Resigned June 1, 1796.	William Strudwick (F)	Seated December 13, 1796
Massachusetts 10	Benjamin Goodhue (F)	Resigned sometime in June 1796, having been elected U.S. Senator.	Samuel Sewall (F)	Seated December 7, 1796
Connecticut at-large	James Hillhouse (F)	Resigned July 1, 1796, having been elected U.S. Senator.	James Davenport (F)	Seated December 5, 1796
Territory South of the River Ohio	James White	Served until June 1, 1796, when Tennessee was admitted to the Union.	District eliminated	
Tennessee at-large	New seat	Tennessee was admitted to the Union June 1, 1796. Seat remained vacant until December 5, 1796.	Andrew Jackson (DR)	Seated December 5, 1796
Pennsylvania 5	Daniel Hiester (DR)	Resigned July 1, 1796.	George Ege (F)	Seated December 8, 1796
Connecticut at-large	Uriah Tracy (F)	Resigned October 13, 1796, having been elected U.S. Senator.	Samuel Dana (F)	Seated January 3, 1797

== Committees ==
Lists of committees and their party leaders.

=== Senate ===
- Whole

=== House of Representatives ===
- Claims (Chairman: Uriah Tracy then Dwight Foster)
- Commerce and Manufactures (Chairman: Benjamin Goodhue then John Swanwick)
- Elections (Chairman: Abraham B. Venable)
- Revisal and Unfinished Business (Chairman: Nicholas Gilman)
- Rules (Select)
- Ways and Means (Chairman: William Loughton Smith)
- Whole

=== Joint committees ===
- Enrolled Bills (Chairman: N/A then Richard Stockton)

== Officers ==
- Architect of the Capitol: William Thornton

=== Senate ===
- Chaplain: William White, Episcopalian
- Doorkeeper: James Mathers
- Secretary: Samuel A. Otis

=== House of Representatives ===
- Chaplain: Ashbel Green, Presbyterian
- Clerk: John Beckley
- Doorkeeper: Thomas Claxton
- Sergeant at Arms: Joseph Wheaton

== See also ==
- 1794 United States elections (elections leading to this Congress)
  - 1794–95 United States Senate elections
  - 1794–95 United States House of Representatives elections
- 1796 United States elections (elections during this Congress, leading to the next Congress)
  - 1796 United States presidential election
  - 1796–97 United States Senate elections
  - 1796–97 United States House of Representatives elections
