= Absalom Tatom =

American politician

Member of the U.S. House of Representatives from North Carolina's 4th district
- In office March 4, 1795 – June 1, 1796
- Preceded by: Alexander Mebane
- Succeeded by: William F. Strudwick

Personal details
- Born: 1742 North Carolina, U.S.
- Died: December 20, 1802 (aged 59–60) Raleigh, North Carolina, U.S.
- Resting place: Old City Cemetery
- Party: Democratic-Republican

Absalom Tatom (1742 – December 20, 1802) was a U.S. Congressman from North Carolina from 1795 to 1796.

== Biography ==
Born in North Carolina in 1742, Tatom was a sergeant in the Greenville, North Carolina Militia in 1763; he served in North Carolina Militia during the American Revolutionary War, where he was commissioned first lieutenant on September 1, 1775, and promoted to the rank of captain June 29, 1776. He resigned from the Continental Army on September 19, 1776.

On August 15, 1778, Tatom enlisted as assistant quartermaster and keeper of the arsenal in the State service at Hillsborough, North Carolina; he was contractor for Hillsborough in 1778 and named major of detachment of the North Carolina Light Horse February 12, 1779.

In 1779, Tatom served as clerk of court in Randolph County; he was elected to the North Carolina House of Commons, but, because of his county clerk position, was disqualified from service in the legislature. In 1781, Tatom was district auditor for Hillsborough.

Tatom rose in state government; in 1782, he was one of three commissioners appointed by Congress to survey lands granted to Continental soldiers in the western territory (later Tennessee); that same year, he was a private secretary of Governor Thomas Burke and state tobacco agent. The Continental Congress named him surveyor of North Carolina in May 1785 and was named commissioner to sign State paper money in December 1785.

In 1788, Tatom was a delegate to the convention which considered ratification of the United States Constitution. In 1794, Tatom was elected as a Democratic-Republican to the 4th United States Congress where he served from March 4, 1795, until his resignation on June 1, 1796. Tatom was later a member of the state House of Commons from 1797 to 1802; he died in Raleigh, North Carolina, in December 1802 and is buried in the Old City Cemetery.

U.S. House of Representatives
Preceded by Alexander Mebane	Member of the U.S. House of Representatives from North Carolina's 4th congressional district 1795–1796	Succeeded by William F. Strudwick
