= William Francis Strudwick =

American politician

Member of the U.S. House of Representatives from North Carolina's 4th district
- In office December 13, 1796 – March 3, 1797
- Preceded by: Absalom Tatom
- Succeeded by: Richard Stanford

Personal details
- Born: May 12, 1770 Stag Park, Wilmington, North Carolina, U.S.
- Died: July 31, 1810 (aged 40)
- Party: Federalist

William Francis Strudwick (May 12, 1770 – July 31, 1810) was a U.S. representative from the state of North Carolina between 1796 and 1797.

Strudwick, born at "Stag Park," near Wilmington, North Carolina in 1770, was a farmer with a limited education. In 1789, he was a delegate to the state constitutional convention; he also served in the North Carolina Senate in 1792 and 1793. In 1796, Strudwick was elected as a Federalist to the 4th United States Congress to fill the vacancy caused by the resignation of Rep. Absalom Tatom, and served from November 28, 1796 to March 3, 1797. In 1801, he joined the North Carolina House of Representatives, where he served until 1803. Strudwick died in 1810 and is buried in a private cemetery at Hawfields, North Carolina.

U.S. House of Representatives
| Preceded by Absalom Tatom | Member of the U.S. House of Representatives from North Carolina's 4th congressional district 1796–1797 | Succeeded by Richard Stanford |
