= Charles Pinckney (governor) =

American Founding Father and politician (1757–1824)

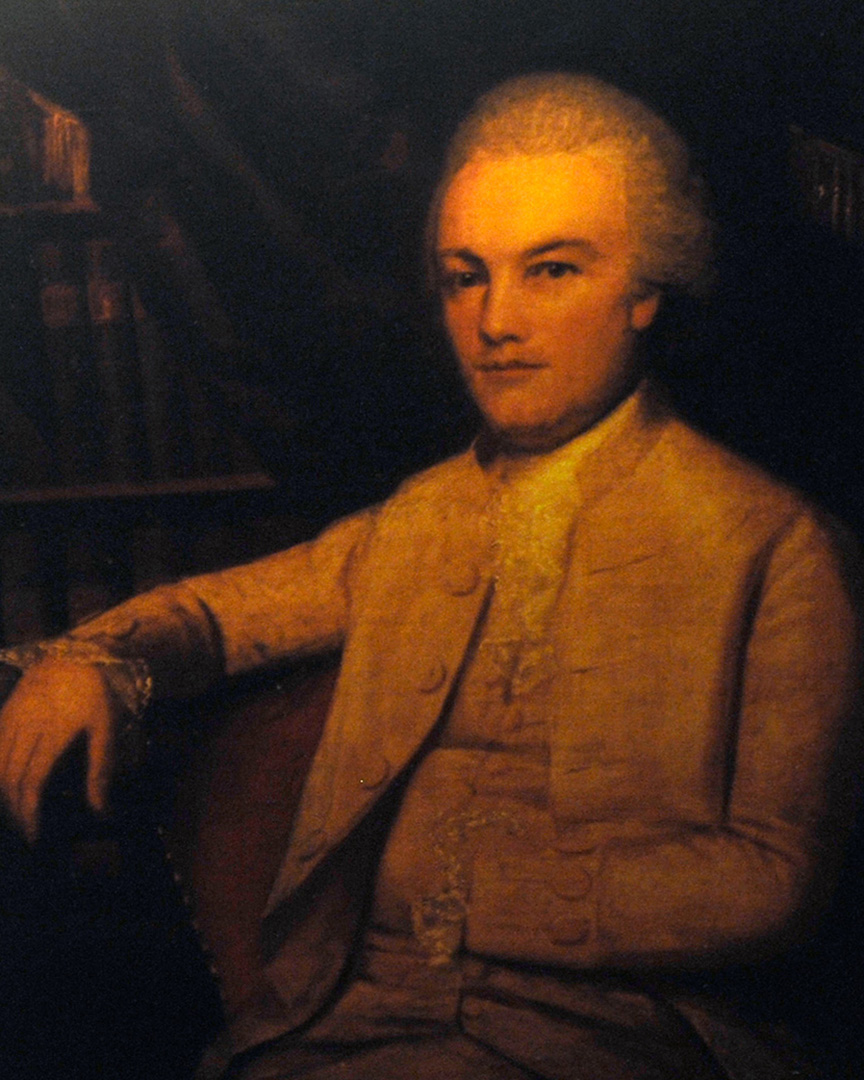
- Portrait by Gilbert Stuart

37th Governor of South Carolina
- In office December 1, 1806 – December 10, 1808
- Lieutenant: John Hopkins
- Preceded by: Paul Hamilton
- Succeeded by: John Drayton
- In office December 1, 1796 – December 6, 1798
- Lieutenant: Robert Anderson
- Preceded by: Arnoldus Vanderhorst
- Succeeded by: Edward Rutledge
- In office January 27, 1789 – December 5, 1792
- Lieutenant: Alexander Gillon; Isaac Holmes
- Preceded by: Thomas Pinckney
- Succeeded by: William Moultrie

Member of the U.S. House of Representatives from South Carolina's 1st district
- In office March 4, 1819 – March 3, 1821
- Preceded by: Henry Middleton
- Succeeded by: Joel Roberts Poinsett

3rd United States Minister to Spain
- In office June 6, 1801 – October 25, 1804
- President: Thomas Jefferson
- Preceded by: David Humphreys
- Succeeded by: George W. Erving

United States Senator from South Carolina
- In office December 6, 1798 – June 6, 1801
- Preceded by: John Hunter
- Succeeded by: Thomas Sumter

Delegate from South Carolina to the Congress of the Confederation
- In office November 1, 1784 – October 30, 1787

1st President of the South Carolina Senate
- In office August 31, 1779 – January 8, 1782
- Preceded by: Position established
- Succeeded by: John Lloyd

Member of the South Carolina Senate from St. Phillip's and St. Michael's Parish
- In office August 31, 1779 – January 8, 1782

Member of the South Carolina House of Representatives from St. Phillip's and St. Michael's Parish
- In office November 26, 1810 – November 28, 1814

Member of the South Carolina House of Representatives from Christ Church Parish
- In office November 24, 1806 – December 9, 1806
- In office November 26, 1792 – December 8, 1796
- In office January 1, 1787 – January 21, 1789

Personal details
- Born: October 26, 1757 Charles Town, Province of South Carolina, British America
- Died: October 29, 1824 (aged 67) Charleston, South Carolina, U.S.
- Resting place: Saint Philip's Episcopal Church Cemetery, Charleston; 32.7792°N 79.9291°W
- Party: Federalist
- Other political affiliations: Democratic-Republican
- Spouse: Mary Eleanor Laurens
- Relations: Colonel Charles Pinckney (father); Frances Brewton (mother)
- Children: 3
- Profession: Lawyer, Statesman

Charles Pinckney Jr. (October 26, 1757 – October 29, 1824) was an American Founding Father, planter, and politician who was a signer of the United States Constitution. He was elected and served as the 37th governor of South Carolina, later serving two more non-consecutive terms. He also served as a U.S. Senator and a member of the House of Representatives. He was a first cousin once removed of fellow signer Charles Cotesworth Pinckney. Pinckney's descendants included seven future South Carolina governors, including men related to the Maybank and Rhett families.

== Early life and education ==
Armorial Achievement of Charles Pinckney

Pinckney was born and educated in Charles Town in the Province of South Carolina. His father, Colonel Charles Pinckney, was a wealthy lawyer and planter. His mother was Frances Brewton (b. 1733), daughter of a goldsmith and sister of Miles Brewton and Rebecca Brewton Motte, who were both also prominent in Charleston history.

His father had signed a loyalty oath to the British after they occupied Charleston in 1780 during the American Revolutionary War. This oath enabled him to keep his property. On his death in 1782, the senior Pinckney bequeathed Snee Farm, a plantation outside the city, and the enslavement of numerous people, to his eldest son Charles.

== Marriage and family ==
Busy with the war and his political career, Pinckney did not marry until 1788. He married Mary Eleanor Laurens on April 27, 1788, at Saint Philip's Church in Charleston. Mary was the daughter of Henry Laurens, a wealthy and politically powerful South Carolina slave trader. They had at least three children.

Among his in-laws were father-in-law Henry Laurens, Colonel John Laurens, and U.S. Representative David Ramsay. A brother-in-law married the daughter of South Carolina Governor John Rutledge.

== Career ==
Pinckney was elected as a delegate to the Third Continental Congress (1777–78). Pinckney started to practice law in Charleston in 1779 at age 21. About that time, well after the War for Independence had begun, Pinckney enlisted in the militia. Pinckney became a lieutenant and served at the siege of Savannah. When Charleston fell to the British the following year, Pinckney was captured; he was held as a prisoner until June 1781 and sent north for a potential exchange. Pinckney did not return to Charleston until 1783. The British also captured Pinckney's father. Pinckney and more than 160 men signed oaths of allegiance to the British to avoid having property confiscated. After the war, Pinckney was fined 12% on his property for having sworn the oath of allegiance.

Pinckney was elected again to the Continental Congress following the war, serving from 1784 to 1787. He was also elected to the state legislature for several terms (1779–1780, 1786–1789, and 1792–1796). As a nationalist, he worked in Congress to ensure that the United States would receive navigation rights from Spain to the Mississippi River and to strengthen congressional power.

Pinckney eventually owned several plantations and a townhouse in Charleston in addition to Snee Farm: Frankville and Hopton, situated on both sides of the Congaree River, near Columbia; a plantation in Georgetown consisting of 560 acres of tidal swamp and 600 acres of high land; a tract of 1,200 acres called Lynches Creek; Fee Farm on the Ashepoo River; Shell Hall, a house with four acres of land at Haddrell's Point in Christ Church Parish; a house and garden lot on Meeting Street, Charleston; Wright's Savannah plantation on the Carolina side of the Savannah River; and a tract of land on the Santee River above the canal, including a ferry, called Mount Tacitus. After Pinckney married Eleanor Laurens in 1788, the elegant three-story brick home at 16 Meeting Street in Charleston presumably became his principal residence. In the 1790 federal census, he is recorded as enslaving "14 slaves in St. Philip's and St. Michael's Parish, 52 slaves in St. Bartholomew, and 45 slaves in the Orangeburg District," all in addition to Snee Farm, where his father's probate record had listed 40 enslaved people in 1787.

=== Constitutional Convention ===
Pinckney's role in the Constitutional Convention is controversial. Although one of the youngest delegates, he later claimed to have been the most influential one and contended he had submitted a draft, known as the Pinckney Plan, that was the basis of the final Constitution. This narrative was strongly disputed by James Madison and some of the other framers. Pinckney submitted an elaborate form of the Virginia Plan, proposed first by Edmund Randolph; other delegates disregarded it. Historians assess him as an important contributing delegate. Pinckney boasted that he was 24, allowing him to claim distinction as the youngest delegate, but he was 29 years old at the time of the convention. He attended full-time, spoke often and effectively, contributed to the final draft, and resolved problems that arose during the debates. He also worked to ratify the Constitution in South Carolina (1788).

At the convention, Pierce Butler and Pinckney, both from South Carolina, introduced the Fugitive Slave Clause (Article IV, Section II, Clause III). James Wilson of Pennsylvania objected, saying that it was special protection for enslavers, requiring all state governments to enforce it at taxpayers' expense, in places where no one or most residents did not enslave people. Butler withdrew the clause, but the next day, a Southerner reinstated it, and the convention adopted it without further objection. This clause was added to the clause that provided extradition for fugitives from justice.

No Person held to Service or Labour in one State, under the Laws thereof, escaping into another, shall, in Consequence of any Law or Regulation therein, be discharged from such Service or Labour, but shall be delivered up on Claim of the Party to whom such Service or Labour may be due.

This clause was first applied to fugitive slaves and required that they be extradited upon enslavers' claims. Despite the clause, free states sometimes declined to enforce it. The Fugitive Slave Act of 1850 increased requirements on the states and penalties for failure to assist in re-enslavement. This practice was not eliminated until the Thirteenth Amendment abolished the institution of slavery. In 1864, during the Civil War, an effort to repeal this clause of the Constitution had failed.

Pinckney introduced a clause in the Constitution opposing an established state religion. His No Religious Test Clause read as follows:

no religious test shall ever be required as a qualification to any office or public trust under the United States

Once the phrase was included in a vote, it passed with little opposition. For the first time, an official of a national government was not required to have a religion. Pinckney is also responsible for the inclusion of the writ of habeas corpus into the Constitution. Initially introduced as "Nor shall the privilege of the Writ of Habeas Corpus ever be suspended, except in case of rebellion or invasion", it is now a part of Article 1 of the United States Constitution.

=== Later career ===
Pinckney's political career blossomed. From 1789 to 1792, the state legislature elected him as governor of South Carolina, in 1790 he chaired the state constitutional convention, and in 1792 he received 8 votes from the legislature for the U.S. Senate. During this period, he became associated with the Federalist Party, where he and his cousin Charles Cotesworth Pinckney were leaders. But, with the passage of time, the former's views began to change. In 1795 he attacked the Federalist-backed Jay Treaty. He increasingly began casting his lot with Carolina back-country Democratic-Republicans against his eastern elite. The population in the western part of the state was increasing, but legislative apportionment favored the Low Country planters. In 1796 Pinckney was elected governor again by the state legislature. In 1798 his Democratic-Republican supporters in the legislature elected him to the U.S. Senate.

Pinckney strongly opposed the actions of his former party. In the presidential election of 1800, Pinckney served as Thomas Jefferson's campaign manager in South Carolina. The victorious Jefferson appointed Pinckney as minister to Spain (1801–05). Pinckney tried but failed to gain Spanish Florida cession to the United States. Pinckney facilitated Spanish acquiescence in the transfer of Louisiana from France to the United States in 1803 by the Louisiana Purchase. (Spain had already returned rule of this territory to France under Napoleon.)

Pinckney returned from Spain to Charleston and the leadership of the state Democratic-Republican Party. Pinckney served in the legislature in 1805–06 and was elected again as governor (1806–08). In this position, he favored legislative reapportionment to give more fair representation to back-country districts. Pinckney also advocated universal white manhood suffrage. He served again in the legislature from 1810 to 1814 and then temporarily withdrew from politics. In 1818, he won the U.S. House of Representatives election, where he fought against the Missouri Compromise. A major enslaver whose wealth depended on enslaved labor at his plantations, Pinckney supported an expansion of the institution of slavery to new territories and states.

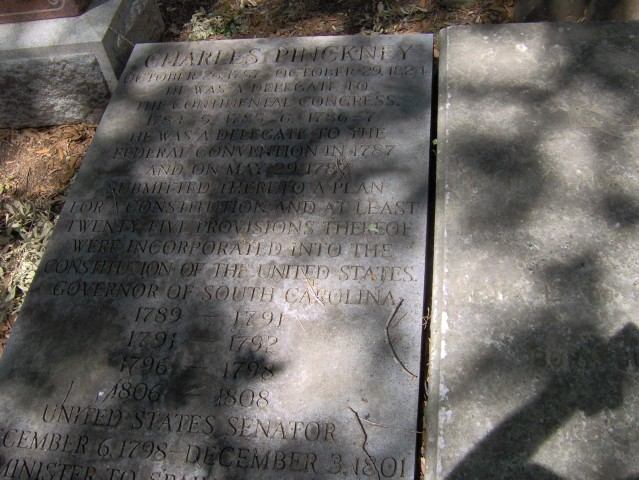
Pinckney's grave at St. Philip's in Charleston

In 1821, with his health beginning to fail, Pinckney retired for the last time from politics. Pinckney died in 1824. A memorial was erected in St. Michael's Church in Charleston, South Carolina. The memorial was sculpted by Solomon Gibson (younger brother of John Gibson) in Liverpool in Great Britain.

== Legacy and honors ==
Pinckney's Snee Farm plantation is maintained as Charles Pinckney National Historic Site. The nearby Charles Pinckney Elementary School in Mount Pleasant is named for him. His son, Henry L. Pinckney, was a U.S. Representative from South Carolina and mayor of Charleston. His daughter married Robert Young Hayne, who became a U.S. Representative, mayor of Charleston, and governor of South Carolina. Pinckney was a Freemason and a Solomon's Lodge No. 1 member in Charleston.

== See also ==
- U.S. Constitution, slavery debate in Convention
- Independent state legislature theory: constitutional legal theory ascribed to Pinckney.

Political offices
Preceded by Thomas Pinckney	Governor of South Carolina; 1789–1792	Succeeded by William Moultrie
Preceded by Arnoldus Vanderhorst	Governor of South Carolina; 1796–1798	Succeeded by Edward Rutledge
Preceded by Paul Hamilton	Governor of South Carolina; 1806–1808	Succeeded by John Drayton
U.S. Senate
Preceded by John Hunter	U.S. senator (Class 2) from South Carolina; 1798–1801; Served alongside: Jacob Read, John Ewing Colhoun	Succeeded by Thomas Sumter
Diplomatic posts
Preceded by David Humphreys	U.S. Minister to Spain; 1802–1804	Succeeded by George W. Erving
U.S. House of Representatives
Preceded by Henry Middleton	Member of the U.S. House of Representatives from South Carolina's 1st congressional district 1819–1821	Succeeded by Joel R. Poinsett
