= John Hunter (South Carolina politician) =

American politician

United States Senator from South Carolina
- In office December 8, 1796 – November 26, 1798
- Preceded by: Pierce Butler
- Succeeded by: Charles Pinckney

Member of the U.S. House of Representatives from South Carolina's 2nd district
- In office March 4, 1793 – March 3, 1795
- Preceded by: Robert Barnwell
- Succeeded by: Wade Hampton I

Member of the South Carolina House of Representatives from Laurens County
- In office January 3, 1791 – March 3, 1793
- Preceded by: Constituency established
- Succeeded by: James Saxon

Member of the South Carolina House of Representatives from Little River District
- In office January 3, 1785 – January 20, 1790

Personal details
- Born: c. 1752 Province of South Carolina, British America
- Died: December 30, 1802 (aged 49–50) Laurens District, South Carolina, U.S.
- Party: Democratic-Republican

John Hunter (c. 1752 – December 30, 1802) was an American farmer from Newberry, South Carolina. He represented South Carolina in the U.S. House from 1793 until 1795 and in the United States Senate from 1796 to 1798.

Hunter was born in the Province of South Carolina around 1752, but his exact date of birth is not known. He was educated in South Carolina and became a plantation owner and operator near Newberry, South Carolina. He served in the South Carolina House of Representatives from 1786 to 1792, and was a Federalist presidential elector in 1792.

In 1792 he was elected to the United States House of Representatives. He served in the 3rd Congress, March 4, 1793 to March 3, 1795. He was elected to the United States Senate as a Democratic-Republican, filling the vacancy caused by the resignation of Pierce Butler; he served from December 8, 1796, to November 26, 1798, when he resigned. He previously ran for the other Senate seat in 1794, losing to state House speaker Jacob Read.

After leaving the Senate, Hunter resumed operation of his plantations. He died on December 30, 1802, and was interred at Little River/Dominick Presbyterian Cemetery in Newberry County, South Carolina.

U.S. Senate
Preceded by Pierce Butler	U.S. senator (Class 2) from South Carolina; 1796–1798; Served alongside: Jacob Read	Succeeded by Charles Pinckney
U.S. House of Representatives
Preceded by Robert Barnwell	Member of the U.S. House of Representatives from South Carolina's 2nd congressional district 1793–1795	Succeeded by Wade Hampton I
