= Jacob Read =

American politician

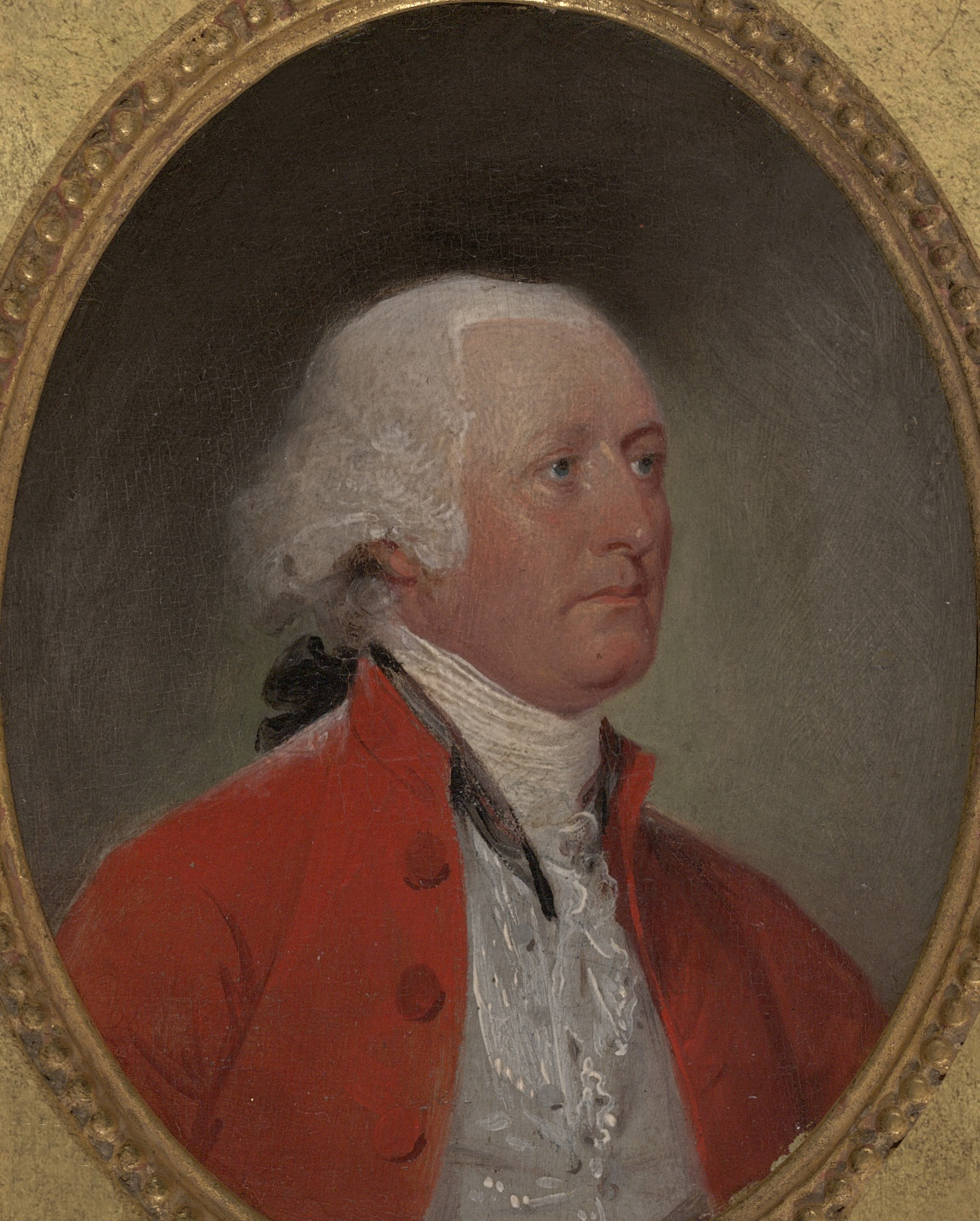
- Portrait miniature by John Trumbull, c. 1793

President pro tempore of the United States Senate
- In office November 22, 1797 – December 12, 1797
- Preceded by: William Bradford
- Succeeded by: Theodore Sedgwick

United States Senator from South Carolina
- In office March 4, 1795 – March 3, 1801
- Preceded by: Ralph Izard
- Succeeded by: John E. Colhoun

9th Speaker of the South Carolina House of Representatives
- In office January 5, 1789 - December 17, 1794
- Preceded by: John J. Pringle
- Succeeded by: Robert Barnwell

Personal details
- Born: 1752 near Charleston, South Carolina
- Died: July 17, 1816 (aged 63–64) near Charleston, South Carolina, U.S.
- Resting place: I'on Cemetery (Historic Hobcaw Cemetery), Bond/Read Family Cemetery
- Party: Federalist
- Occupation: planter; politician
- Profession: Lawyer

Jacob Read (1752 – July 17, 1816) was an American lawyer and politician from Charleston, South Carolina. He represented South Carolina in both the Continental Congress (1783–1785) and the United States Senate (1795–1801).

== Biography ==
Read was born at "Hobcaw" plantation in Christ Church Parish, near Charleston, South Carolina, in 1752. After he completed preparatory studies, he studied law and was admitted to the bar. He also studied in England from 1773 to 1776. He joined other Americans in London in 1774 in a petition against the Boston port bill.

== Career ==
When Read returned to the United States, he served South Carolina in various military and civil capacities during the Revolutionary War. He was sent with other Americans as a prisoner of the British to St. Augustine from 1780 to 1781. He was a member of the State assembly in 1782, and of the privy council in 1783. He served as a Member of the Continental Congress from 1783 to 1785, and was a member of the South Carolina House of Representatives from St. Philip's and St. Michael's Parish. His service in the state lower house lasted from January 8, 1782, to December 17, 1794, and served as Speaker for the last five years in that house. He ran for the U.S. House of Representatives in 1793.

Elected as a Federalist to the United States Senate, Read served a single term from March 4, 1795, to March 3, 1801. He served as president pro tempore of the Senate during the Fifth Congress for about a month, but was an unsuccessful candidate for reelection. He was succeeded by Democratic-Republican John E. Colhoun.

== Death ==
Read died in Charleston, South Carolina, on July 17, 1816 (age about 64 years). He is interred in the Bond/Read family cemetery at "Hobcaw," in Christ Church Parish, near Charleston.

U.S. Senate
Preceded by Ralph Izard	U.S. senator (Class 3) from South Carolina; 1795–1801; Served alongside: Pierce Butler, John Hunter, Charles Pinckney	Succeeded by John Ewing Colhoun
Political offices
Preceded by William Bradford	President pro tempore of the United States Senate; November 22, 1797 – December 12, 1797	Succeeded by Theodore Sedgwick
