= 1796 United States presidential election in Massachusetts =

- November 7, 1796
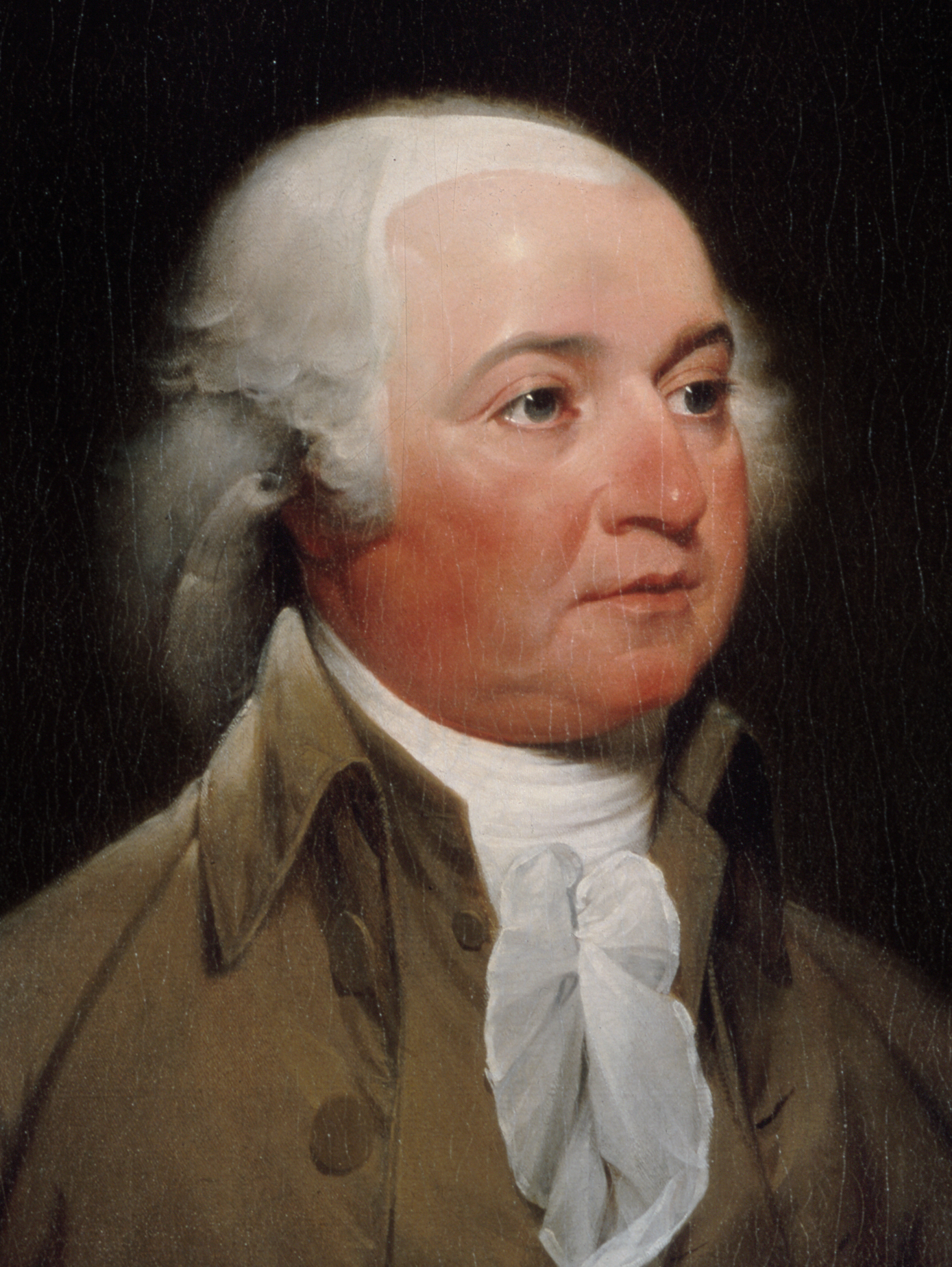
Nominee	John Adams
Party	Federalist
Home state	Massachusetts
Running mate	Thomas Pinckney
Electoral vote	16
Popular vote	8,104
Percentage	100.00%
County results
Adams
50-60%
60-70%
70–80%
80–90%
90-100%
Jefferson
60-70%
President before election
George Washington
Independent
Elected President
John Adams
Federalist

A presidential election was held in Massachusetts on November 7, 1796, as part of the 1796 United States presidential election. The Federalist vice president John Adams defeated the Democratic-Republican former secretary of state Thomas Jefferson.

Federalist electors carried seven electoral districts with a majority of the popular vote. The Massachusetts General Court subsequently chose Federalists to represent the seven remaining districts, and appointed two additional electors to represent the state at-large. The electors voted for Adams as a bloc but split their second votes among three other candidates. Divisions among Northern Federalists allowed Jefferson to succeed Adams as vice president under the rule which awarded the office to the runner-up in the presidential election.

== Candidates ==
=== 1st Eastern District ===
==== Appointed ====
- Thomas Rice, former Massachusetts senator (Federalist)

==== Eliminated in legislature ====
- Amos Stoddard, attorney

=== 2nd Eastern District ===
==== Elected ====
- Stephen Longfellow (Federalist)

=== 3rd Eastern District ===
==== Elected ====
- Nathaniel Wells (Federalist)

==== Eliminated in election ====
- Ichabod Goodwin

==== Eliminated in election ====
- Lemuel Weeks

=== 1st Middle District ===
==== Elected ====
- Thomas Dawes, president of the Massachusetts Senate (Federalist)

==== Eliminated in election ====
- Samuel Adams, governor of Massachusetts (Democratic-Republican)

=== 2nd Middle District ===
==== Appointed ====
- Elbridge Gerry, former U.S. representative from Massachusetts's 3rd congressional district (Federalist)

== Results by presidential candidates ==
1796 United States presidential election in Massachusetts
Party	Candidate	Votes	%
Federalist	John Adams	8,104	100.00%
Total votes		8,104	100.00%

=== Results by county ===
1796 United States presidential election in Massachusetts
County	John Adams Federalist		Margin		Total (Note: Direct results for John Adams and Thomas Jefferson are taken from all electors with either a formal ticket pledge, or a submitted electoral vote, for each county.)
County	#	%	#	%	Total
Barnstable	373	100.00%	373	100.00%	373
Berkshire	443	100.00%	443	100.00%	443
Bristol	132	100.00%	132	100.00%	132
Cumberland	227	100.00%	227	100.00%	227
Dukes	88	100.00%	88	100.00%	88
Essex	491	100.00%	491	100.00%	491
Hampshire	1,161	100.00%	1,161	100.00%	1,161
Hancock	70	100.00%	70	100.00%	70
Lincoln	464	100.00%	464	100.00%	464
Middlesex	686	100.00%	686	100.00%	686
Nantucket	86	100.00%	86	100.00%	86
Norfolk	385	100.00%	385	100.00%	385
Plymouth	498	100.00%	498	100.00%	498
Suffolk	1,470	100.00%	1,470	100.00%	1,470
Washington	No data		No data		
Worcester	1,158	100.00%	1,158	100.00%	1,158
York	372	100.00%	372	100.00%	372
Total	8,104	100.00%	8,104	100.00%	8,104

=== Results by district ===
1796 United States presidential election in Massachusetts
District	E.V.	John Adams Federalist			Margin		Total (Note: Direct results for John Adams and Thomas Jefferson are taken from all electors with either a formal ticket pledge, or a submitted electoral vote, for each district.)
District	E.V.	#	%	E.V.	#	%	Total
At-large electors	2	-	-	2	-	-	-
First Western	1	499	100.00%	1	499	100.00%	499
Second Western	1	539	100.00%	1	539	100.00%	539
Third Western	1	685	100.00%	1	685	100.00%	685
Fourth Western	1	963	100.00%	1	963	100.00%	963
First Southern	1	547	100.00%	1	547	100.00%	547
Second Southern	1	651	100.00%	1	651	100.00%	651
Third Southern	1	245	100.00%	1	245	100.00%	245
First Middle	1	1,715	100.00%	1	1,715	100.00%	1,715
Second Middle	1	527	100.00%	1	527	100.00%	527
Third Middle	1	235	100.00%	1	235	100.00%	235
Fourth Middle	1	365	100.00%	1	365	100.00%	365
First Eastern	1	325	100.00%	1	325	100.00%	325
Second Eastern	1	418	100.00%	1	418	100.00%	418
Third Eastern	1	390	100.00%	1	390	100.00%	390
Total	16	8,104	100.00%	16	8,104	100.00%	8,104

== Results by presidential electors ==
1796 United States presidential election in Massachusetts
Party	Candidate	Votes	%
Federalist	Federalist electors	12,176	79.25%
Democratic-Republican	Democratic-Republican electors	3,188	20.75%
Total votes		15,364	100.00%

=== Results by county ===
1796 United States presidential election in Massachusetts
County	Federalist electors		Democratic-Republican electors		Margin		Total
County	#	%	#	%	#	%	Total
Barnstable	645	100.00%	0	0.00%	645	100.00%	645
Berkshire	558	41.95%	772	58.05%	-214	-16.10%	1,330
Bristol	245	100.00%	0	0.00%	245	100.00%	245
Cumberland	316	100.00%	0	0.00%	316	100.00%	316
Dukes	95	94.06%	6	5.94%	89	88.12%	101
Essex	820	93.39%	58	6.61%	762	86.78%	878
Hampshire	2,212	94.65%	125	5.35%	2,087	89.30%	2,337
Hancock	108	100.00%	0	0.00%	108	100.00%	108
Lincoln	774	100.00%	0	0.00%	774	100.00%	774
Middlesex	1,421	69.90%	612	30.10%	809	39.80%	2,033
Nantucket	88	100.00%	0	0.00%	88	100.00%	88
Norfolk	495	62.50%	297	37.50%	198	25.00%	792
Plymouth	570	95.00%	30	5.00%	540	90.00%	600
Suffolk	1,487	60.30%	979	39.70%	508	20.60%	2,466
Washington	No data		No data		No data		
Worcester	1,872	87.52%	267	12.48%	1,605	75.04%	2,139
York	470	91.80%	42	8.20%	428	83.60%	512
Total	12,176	79.25%	3,188	20.75%	8,988	58.50%	15,364

==== Results by county swing ====
Swing compared to the 1792 election
County	Party		Status
County	Federalist	Democratic-Republican	Status
County	± pp	± pp	Status
Barnstable	0.00 pp	0.00 pp	Hold
Berkshire	▼36.37 pp	▲36.37 pp	Flip
Bristol	▲28.57 pp	▼28.57 pp	Gain
Cumberland	▲0.34 pp	▼0.34 pp	Gain
Dukes	▼5.94 pp	▲5.94 pp	Loss
Essex	▲4.86 pp	▼4.86 pp	Gain
Hampshire	▲14.99 pp	▼14.99 pp	Gain
Hancock	0.00 pp	0.00 pp	Hold
Lincoln	0.00 pp	0.00 pp	Hold
Middlesex	▲7.60 pp	▼7.60 pp	Gain
Nantucket	0.00 pp	0.00 pp	Hold
Norfolk	No data	No data	New
Plymouth	▼4.55 pp	▲4.55 pp	Loss
Suffolk	▼10.04 pp	▲10.04 pp	Loss
Washington	No data	No data	N/A
Worcester	▲11.62 pp	▼11.62 pp	Gain
York	▲1.71 pp	▼1.71 pp	Gain
Total	▲1.06 pp	▼1.06 pp	Gain

=== Results by district ===
1796 United States presidential election in Massachusetts
District	E.V.	Federalist electors			Democratic-Republican electors			Margin		Total
District	E.V.	#	%	E.V.	#	%	E.V.	#	%	Total
At-large electors	2	-	-	2	-	-	0	-	-	-
First Western	1	667	43.03%	1	883	56.97%	0	-216	-13.94%	1,550
Second Western	1	1,427	99.93%	1	1	0.07%	0	1,426	99.86%	1,428
Third Western	1	1,194	98.92%	1	13	1.08%	0	1,181	97.84%	1,207
Fourth Western	1	1,092	83.81%	1	211	16.19%	0	881	67.62%	1,303
First Southern	1	971	99.39%	1	6	0.61%	0	965	98.78%	977
Second Southern	1	656	92.26%	1	55	7.74%	0	601	84.52%	711
Third Southern	1	390	100.00%	1	0	0.00%	0	390	100.00%	390
First Middle	1	1,718	55.38%	1	1,384	44.62%	0	334	10.76%	3,102
Second Middle	1	1,173	68.68%	1	535	31.32%	0	638	37.36%	1,708
Third Middle	1	586	100.00%	1	0	0.00%	0	586	100.00%	586
Fourth Middle	1	634	91.62%	1	58	8.38%	0	576	83.24%	692
First Eastern	1	644	100.00%	1	0	0.00%	0	644	100.00%	644
Second Eastern	1	523	100.00%	1	0	0.00%	0	523	100.00%	523
Third Eastern	1	501	92.27%	1	42	7.73%	0	459	84.54%	543
Total	16	12,176	79.25%	16	3,188	20.75%	0	8,988	58.50%	15,364

=== Results by elector ===
1796 United States presidential election in Massachusetts's 1st congressional district: First Western
Party	Candidate	Votes	%
Democratic-Republican	Simon Larned (Note: Democratic-Republican leader in politics.) (Note: Failed to reach a majority of votes.)	748	34.57%
Federalist	David Rossiter (Note: Federalist elector for this election. Failed to reach a majority of votes and was subsequently selected to be a presidential elector by the Massachusetts General Court. Federalist candidate for the Massachusetts state senate in 1799.)	499	23.06%
Unknown	Truman Wheeler	426	19.69%
Federalist	Thomas Ives (Note: Described as being a zealous federalist in politics. Federalist candidate for the Massachusetts state senate in 1799. No documented political/oppositional shift noted during the 1790s.)	157	7.26%
Unknown	Jonathan Remington	140	6.47%
Democratic-Republican	Thompson J. Skinner (Note: Democratic-Republican candidate for the Massachusetts state senate in 1796.)	50	2.31%
Democratic-Republican	John Bacon (Note: Democratic-Republican candidate for the Massachusetts state senate in 1796.)	49	2.26%
Unknown	William Walker	32	1.48%
Democratic-Republican	Barnabas Bidwell (Note: Began his political career in 1788 as an early federalist. Changed his affiliation to republican during the 1790s while "casting his lot" with Thomas Jefferson in politics. Figuratively wore a "Jacobin cap" in 1798. 'Jacobin' was the federalist epithet for democratic-republicans during this period.)	31	1.43%
Unknown	Samuel Larned	19	0.88%
Federalist	Ephraim Williams (Note: Federalist candidate for the 5th United States Congress (1797-1799). Federalist candidate Massachusetts House of Representatives in 1800. No documented political/oppositional shift noted during the 1790s.)	8	0.37%
Federalist	Daniel Dewey (Note: Federalist in politics.)	2	0.09%
Unknown	Dicky Jones	1	0.05%
Unknown	William Bacon	1	0.05%
Federalist	Woodbridge Little (Note: A man with conservative tendencies, who inevitably allied himself with federalists in state affairs.)	1	0.05%
Total votes		2,164	100.00%

1796 United States presidential election in Massachusetts's 2nd congressional district: Second Western
Party	Candidate	Votes	%
Federalist	Ebenezer Hunt (Note: Federalist elector for this election. Failed to reach a majority of votes and was subsequently selected to be a presidential elector by the Massachusetts General Court.)	539	36.05%
Federalist	Caleb Strong (Note: Federalist elector for this election.)	412	27.56%
Federalist	William Shepard (Note: Federalist candidate for the Massachusetts senate in 1796.)	287	19.20%
Federalist	Justin Ely	157	10.50%
Unknown	Samuel Henshaw	47	3.14%
Federalist	David Sexton	25	1.67%
Unknown	John Williams	16	1.07%
Federalist	John Hastings	3	0.20%
Federalist	Samuel Fowler	3	0.20%
Unknown	Warham Parks	2	0.13%
Unknown	Abel Whitney	1	0.07%
Unknown	John Taylor	1	0.07%
Federalist	Joseph Lyman (Note: Federalist elector for this election.)	1	0.07%
Democratic-Republican	William Lyman (Note: Democratic-Republican represenatative for the 4th United States Congress (1795-1797).)	1	0.07%
Total votes		1,495	100.00%

1796 United States presidential election in Massachusetts's 3rd congressional district: Third Western
Party	Candidate	Votes	%
Federalist	Ebenezer Mattoon (Note: Federalist elector for this election.)	685	56.61%
Federalist	Daniel Bigelow (Note: Federalist candidate for the Massachusetts state senate in 1796.)	394	32.56%
Federalist	Thomas Dwight	64	5.29%
Federalist	Jonathan Warner	49	4.05%
Democratic-Republican	Martin Kinsley (Note: Democratic-Republican candidate for the Massachusetts senate in 1796.)	13	1.07%
Unknown	Simeon Strong	2	0.17%
Unknown	Adam Clark	1	0.08%
Federalist	Caleb Strong	1	0.08%
Federalist	Samuel Lyman	1	0.08%
Total votes		1,210	100.00%

1796 United States presidential election in Massachusetts's 4th congressional district: Fourth Western
Party	Candidate	Votes	%
Federalist	Joseph Allen (Note: Federalist elector for this election.)	963	72.84%
Democratic-Republican	Moses Gill (Note: Democratic-Republican candidate for the Massachusetts governor in 1797.)	138	10.44%
Federalist	Artemas Ward	127	9.61%
Democratic-Republican	Levi Lincoln Sr. (Note: Democratic-Republican leader in 1796.)	73	5.52%
Unknown	Nathaniel Paine	17	1.29%
Federalist	John Sprague (Note: Federalist candidate for the Massachusetts senate in 1796.)	2	0.15%
Unknown	Thomas Mar Baker	1	0.08%
Unknown	Joseph Dorr	1	0.08%
Total votes		1,322	100.00%

1796 United States presidential election in Massachusetts's 5th congressional district: First Southern
Party	Candidate	Votes	%
Federalist	Ebenezer Bacon (Note: Federalist elector for this election.)	547	55.93%
Federalist	Solomon Freeman (Note: Federalist candidate for the Massachusetts state senate in 1796.)	260	26.58%
Federalist	Walter Spooner (Note: Was an earnest federalist during the 1790s, when party lines were drawn after the settlement of government. No documented political/oppositional shift noted during the 1790s.)	130	13.29%
Federalist	Daniel Davis (Note: Federalist partisan.)	32	3.27%
Democratic-Republican	William Jernigan (Note: Democratic-Republican candidate for the Massachusetts state senate in 1796.)	6	0.61%
Federalist	David Thatcher (Note: Supported the federal constitution. Federalist candidate for the Massachusetts state senate in 1799. No documented political/oppositional shift noted during the 1790s.)	2	0.20%
Unknown	Timothy Phinney	1	0.10%
Total votes		978	100.00%

1796 United States presidential election in Massachusetts's 6th congressional district: Second Southern
Party	Candidate	Votes	%
Federalist	William Sever (Note: Federalist elector for this election. Failed to reach a majority of votes and was subsequently selected to be a presidential elector by the Massachusetts General Court.)	398	47.32%
Federalist	Edward Robbins (Note: Federalist elector for this election. Failed to reach a majority of votes and was subsequently selected to be an at-large presidential elector by the Massachusetts General Court.)	253	30.08%
Unknown	Joshua Thomas	77	9.16%
Unknown	Benjamin Beale	40	4.76%
Democratic-Republican	James Warren (Note: Anti-Federalist candidate who transitioned into a Democratic-Republican in national politics after 1789.)	32	3.80%
Democratic-Republican	Ebenezer Thayer (Note: Democratic-Republican candidate for the Massachusetts state senate in 1796.)	21	2.50%
Unknown	Charles Cushing	5	0.59%
Federalist	George Partridge (Note: Federalist candidate for the 5th United States Congress (1797-1799).)	5	0.59%
Unknown	John Turner	2	0.24%
Unknown	Joseph Voss	2	0.24%
Democratic-Republican	Josiah Smith (Note: Democratic-Republican candidate for the Massachusetts state senate in 1796.)	2	0.24%
Unknown	Henry Warren	2	0.24%
Unknown	Nathan Cushing	1	0.12%
Unknown	Samuel Angier	1	0.12%
Total votes		841	100.00%

1796 United States presidential election in Massachusetts's 7th congressional district: Third Southern
Party	Candidate	Votes	%
Federalist	Elisha May (Note: Federalist elector for this election. Failed to reach a majority of votes and was subsequently selected to be a presidential elector by the Massachusetts General Court.)	245	25.39%
Unknown	Seth Padelford	220	22.80%
Unknown	Zephaniah Leonard	206	21.35%
Unknown	James Williams	142	14.72%
Federalist	William Baylies (Note: Federalist elector for this election.)	64	6.63%
Federalist	Stephen Bullock (Note: Federalist representative for the 5th United States Congress (1797-1799).)	42	4.35%
Federalist	Seth Bullard (Note: Federalist candidate for the Massachusetts state senate in 1796.)	27	2.80%
Federalist	George Leonard (Note: Federalist representative for the 4th United States Congress (1795-1797).)	9	0.93%
Unknown	Josiah Dean	5	0.52%
Unknown	Samuel Tobey	2	0.21%
Federalist	Stephen Metcalf	2	0.21%
Federalist	Laban Wheaton (Note: Federalist candidate for the 5th United States Congress (1797-1799).)	1	0.10%
Total votes		965	100.00%

1796 United States presidential election in Massachusetts's 8th congressional district: First Middle
Party	Candidate	Votes	%
Federalist	Thomas Dawes Jr. (Note: Federalist elector for this election. Federalist candidate for the Massachusetts state senate in 1796.)	1,712	55.19%
Democratic-Republican	Samuel Adams (Note: Democratic-Republican governor, serving from 1793-1797.)	1,377	44.39%
Democratic-Republican	William Heath (Note: Self-described Republican in a letter of congratulations to John Adams, dated April 10th, 1797.)	5	0.16%
Federalist	Increase Sumner (Note: Federalist elector for this election. Failed to reach a majority of votes and was subsequently selected to be an at-large presidential elector by the Massachusetts General Court.)	3	0.10%
Federalist	Harrison Gray Otis (Note: Federalist elector for this election.)	2	0.06%
Democratic-Republican	James Bowdoin (Note: Democratic-Republican candidate for the Massachusetts state senate in 1796.)	1	0.03%
Federalist	John Adams (Note: Federalist candidate for United States president in 1796.)	1	0.03%
Democratic-Republican	William Eustis (Note: Democratic-Republican candidate for the Massachusetts state senate in 1796.)	1	0.03%
Total votes		3,102	100.00%

1796 United States presidential election in Massachusetts's 9th congressional district: Second Middle
Party	Candidate	Votes	%
Democratic-Republican	James Winthrop (Note: Failed to reach a majority of votes. Anti-Federalist candidate who transitioned into a Democratic-Republican in national politics after 1789.)	529	30.28%
Federalist	Elbridge Gerry (Note: Federalist elector for this election. Failed to reach a majority of votes and was subsequently selected to be a presidential elector by the Massachusetts General Court.)	527	30.17%
Federalist	Eleazer Brooks (Note: Federalist candidate for the Massachusetts state senate in 1796.)	494	28.28%
Federalist	Francis Dana (Note: Federalist elector for this election.)	67	3.84%
Federalist	Ebenezer Bridge	66	3.78%
Unknown	Henry Bromfield	36	2.06%
Federalist	Elijah Brigham	18	1.03%
Democratic-Republican	Joseph Bradley Varnum (Note: Democratic-Republican for the 4th United States Congress (1795-1797).)	6	0.34%
Unknown	Edward Barnes	1	0.06%
Unknown	John B. Varnum	1	0.06%
Unknown	Jonas Brooks	1	0.06%
Federalist	Samuel Hoar (Note: Federalist partisan early in his life, before transitioning into a Whig.)	1	0.06%
Total votes		1,747	100.00%

1796 United States presidential election in Massachusetts's 10th congressional district: Third Middle
Party	Candidate	Votes	%
Unknown	John Norris (Note: Failed to reach a majority of votes.)	235	28.55%
Federalist	Samuel Holten (Note: Federalist elector for this election. Failed to reach a majority of votes and was subsequently selected to be a presidential elector by the Massachusetts General Court.)	235	28.55%
Federalist	Benjamin Hall (Note: Election returns from the Town of Medford recorded all 41 votes for presidential elector Benjamin Hall. Medford showed unequivocal support for John Adams, as being the successor to George Washington, for the 1796 presidential election..)	162	19.68%
Federalist	Loammi Baldwin	124	15.07%
Federalist	Moses Brown (Note: Federalist partisan who was in direct opposition of Thomas Jefferson, and his friends. Federalist candidate for the House of Representatives in 1799.)	41	4.98%
Federalist	Elbridge Gerry (Note: Federalist elector for this election.)	19	2.31%
Federalist	Samuel Sewall (Note: Federalist elector for this election.)	5	0.61%
Unknown	Jonathan Ingersoll	2	0.24%
Total votes		823	100.00%

1796 United States presidential election in Massachusetts's 11th congressional district: Fourth Middle
Party	Candidate	Votes	%
Federalist	Samuel Phillips Jr. (Note: Federalist elector for this election.)	365	52.29%
Federalist	Bailey Bartlett	265	37.97%
Democratic-Republican	Thomas Kittredge (Note: A republican partisan in politics, he was strongly devoted to the republican party, led by Thomas Jefferson.)	57	8.17%
Unknown	John Mycall	3	0.43%
Federalist	Theophilus Bradbury (Note: Federalist representative for the 4th United States Congress (1795-1797), and the 5th United States Congress (1797-1799).)	3	0.43%
Unknown	John Kittredge	2	0.29%
Democratic-Republican	Josiah Smith	1	0.14%
Unknown	Samuel Tufts	1	0.14%
Federalist	Stephen Choate (Note: Federalist candidate for the Massachusetts state senate in 1796.)	1	0.14%
Total votes		698	100.00%

1796 United States presidential election in Massachusetts's 12th congressional district: First Eastern
Party	Candidate	Votes	%
Federalist	Thomas Rice (Note: Federalist elector for this election. Failed to reach a majority of votes and was subsequently selected to be a presidential elector by the Massachusetts General Court.)	325	42.04%
Federalist	Amos Stoddard (Note: Federalist partisan and supporter of John Adams. In January 1797, Stoddard published a political piece under the pseudonym "An Old Soldier" where he advocated for a federalist candidate to unseat Democratic-Republican incumbent Henry Dearborn.)	157	20.31%
Federalist	Daniel Cony (Note: Federalist candidate for the Massachusetts state senate in 1796.)	130	16.82%
Unknown	Jedediah Jewett	36	4.66%
Unknown	Dummer Sewall	28	3.62%
Federalist	Isaac Parker	19	2.46%
Unknown	Samuel Hernden	19	2.46%
Unknown	Arthur Lithgow	17	2.20%
Unknown	Nathaniel Thwing	15	1.94%
Unknown	John Rice	14	1.81%
Federalist	Jonathan Bowman (Note: Federalist candidate for the 4th United States Congress (1795-1797).)	12	1.55%
Federalist	Alexander Campbell	1	0.13%
Total votes		773	100.00%

1796 United States presidential election in Massachusetts's 13th congressional district: Second Eastern
Party	Candidate	Votes	%
Federalist	Stephen Longfellow (Note: Federalist elector for this election.)	418	52.05%
Unknown	Lemuel Weeks	123	15.32%
Unknown	John Waite	75	9.34%
Federalist	John Kilby Smith (Note: Federalist candidate for the Massachusetts state senate in 1796.)	69	8.59%
Unknown	Samuel Thompson	25	3.11%
Unknown	Francis Winter	24	2.99%
Federalist	Daniel Davis	21	2.62%
Unknown	Samuel Tibbetts	21	2.62%
Federalist	John Hubbard (Note: Federalist partisan during the 1790s.)	9	1.12%
Unknown	Thomas B. Waite	7	0.87%
Federalist	Josiah Thacher	6	0.75%
Unknown	Dummer Sewall	3	0.37%
Unknown	Edmund Phinney	1	0.12%
Unknown	John Lewis	1	0.12%
Total votes		803	100.00%

1796 United States presidential election in Massachusetts's 14th congressional district: Third Eastern
Party	Candidate	Votes	%
Federalist	Nathaniel Wells (Note: Federalist elector for this election. Federalist candidate for the Massachusetts state senate in 1796.)	390	59.00%
Federalist	Ichabod Goodwin (Note: A loyal patriot throughout the Revolutionary War and staunch federalist thereafter. Later led the townsmen of Berwick in offering grand toasts to the newly inaugurarted president John Adams, in 1797. No documented political/oppositional shift noted during the 1790s.)	92	13.92%
Unknown	Thomas Cutts	52	7.87%
Democratic-Republican	Richard Foxwell Cutts (Note: Democratic-Republican candidate for the Massachusetts state senate in 1796.)	42	6.35%
Unknown	John Frost	41	6.20%
Federalist	Josiah Thacher	13	1.97%
Unknown	Joseph Morrill	11	1.66%
Unknown	Josiah Prince	9	1.36%
Federalist	Simon Frye (Note: Federalist candidate for the Massachusetts state senate in 1796.)	6	0.91%
Unknown	John Storer	3	0.45%
Unknown	Jonas Clarke	2	0.30%
Total votes		661	100.00%

== See also ==
- United States presidential elections in Massachusetts

== Bibliography ==
=== Archives ===
- Lampi, Philip J. (2012a). "Massachusetts 1796 Electoral College, First Eastern District". A New Nation Votes. American Antiquarian Society.
- Lampi, Philip J. (2012b). "Massachusetts 1796 Electoral College, Second Eastern District". A New Nation Votes. American Antiquarian Society.
- Lampi, Philip J. (2012c). "Massachusetts 1796 Electoral College, Third Eastern District". A New Nation Votes. American Antiquarian Society.

=== Books and articles ===
- Dubin, Michael J. (2002). United States Presidential Elections, 1788-1860. Jefferson, NC: McFarland and Company.
- Heidenreich, Donald E. Jr. (Summer 2011). "Conspiracy Politics in the Election of 1796". New York History. 92 (3): 151–65.
- Kurtz, Stephen G. (1957). The Presidency of John Adams: The Collapse of Federalism, 1795–1800. Philadelphia: University of Pennsylvania Press.
- Morison, Samuel Eliot (1969). Harrison Gray Otis, 1765–1848: The Urbane Federalist. Boston: Houghton Mifflin Company.
- Pasley, Jeffrey L. (2013). The First Presidential Contest: 1796 and the Founding of American Democracy. Lawrence: University Press of Kansas.
