= 1792 United States presidential election in Massachusetts =

- November 2 – December 5, 1792
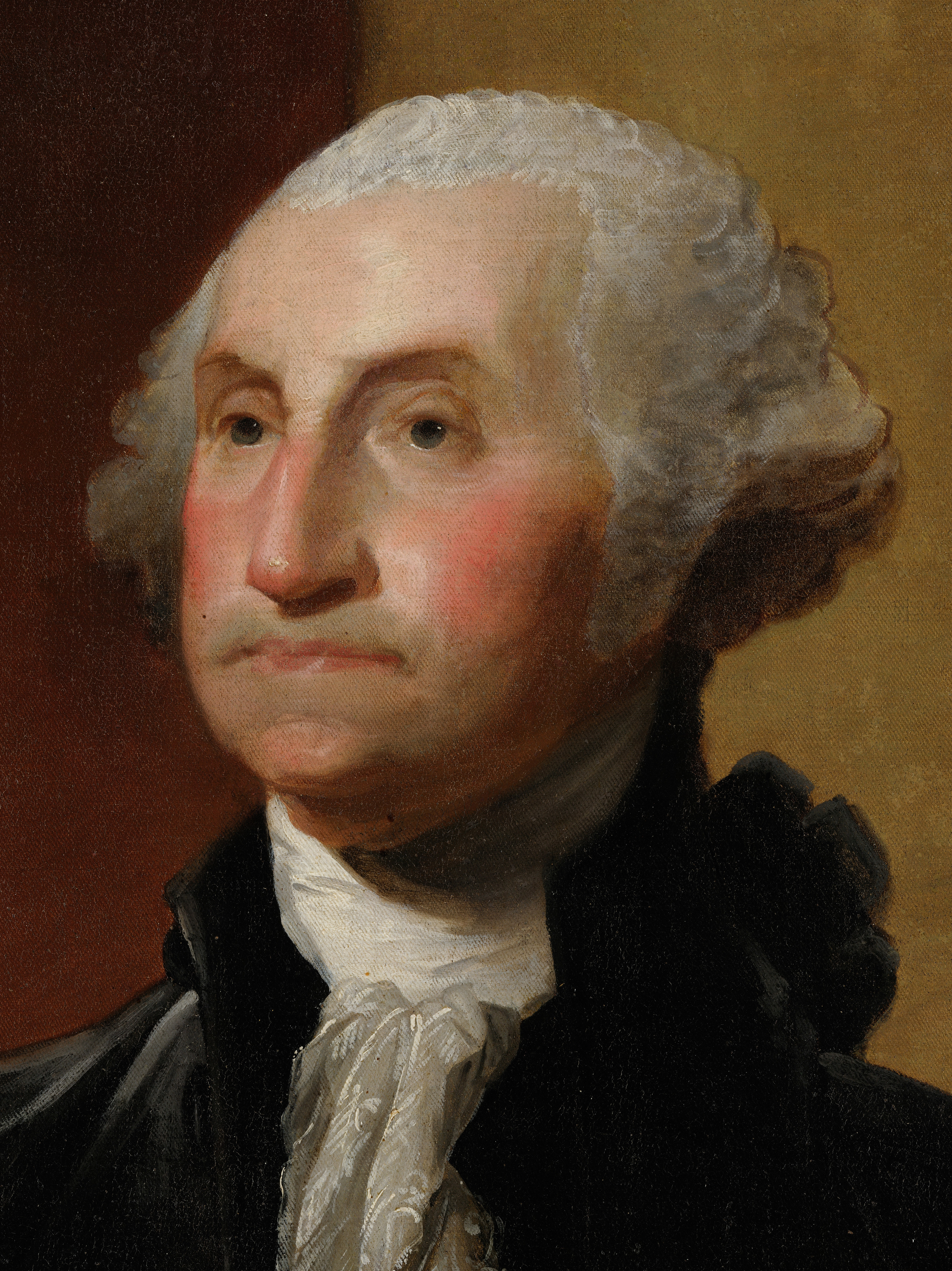

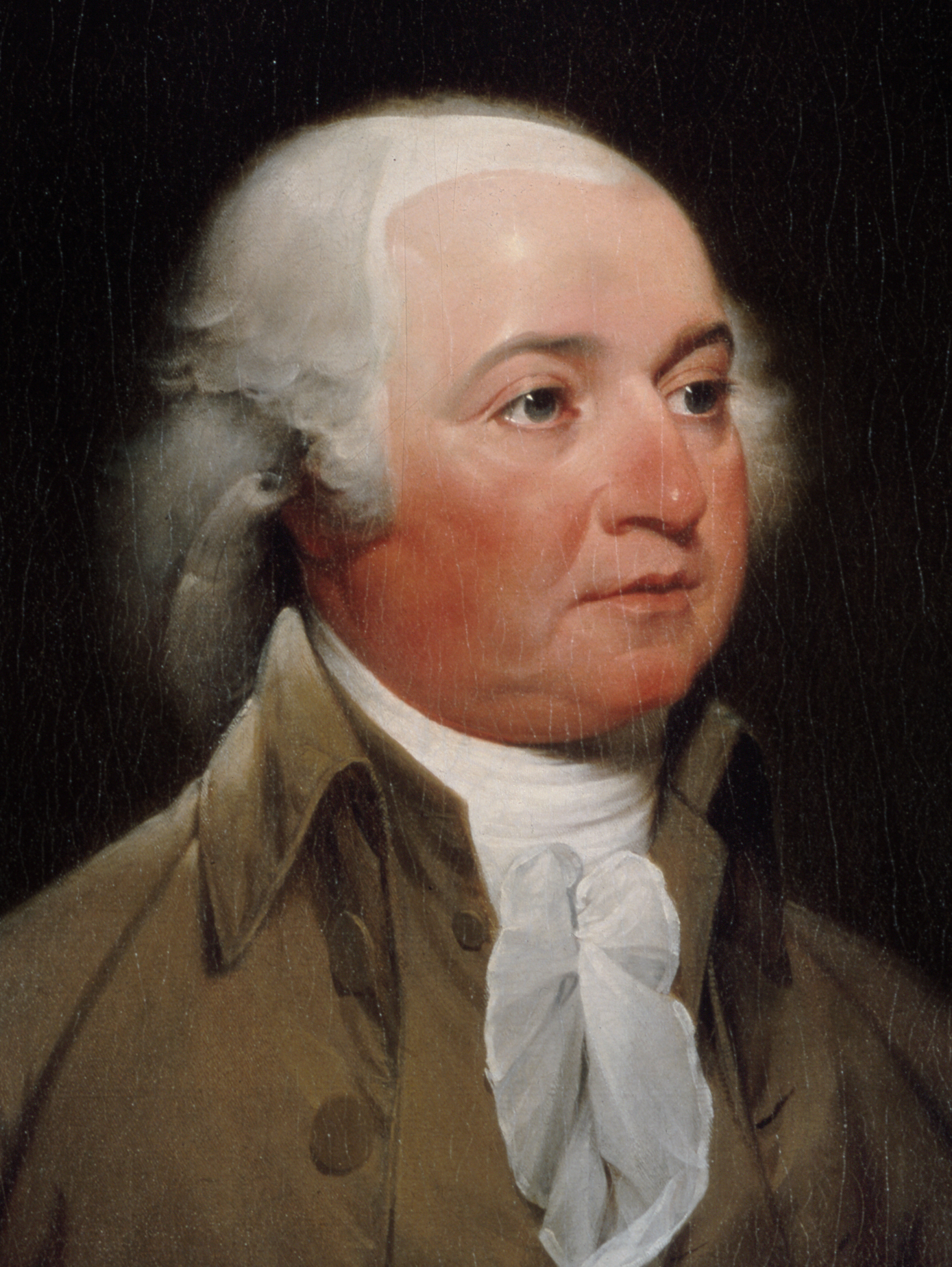
| Nominee | George Washington | John Adams |
| Party | Independent | Federalist |
| Home state | Virginia | Massachusetts |
| Electoral vote | 16 | 16 |
| Popular vote | 5,606 | – |
| Percentage | 100.00% | – |
County results
Washington (Federalist electors)
100%
President before election
George Washington
Independent
Elected President
George Washington
Independent

A presidential election was held in Massachusetts between November 2 and December 5, 1792, as part of the 1792 United States presidential election. In this election, two Congressional districts chose five electors each, the remaining two districts chose three electors. Each elector chosen by majority vote of voters in Congressional district. If an insufficient number of electors are chosen by majority vote from a Congressional district, remaining electors would be appointed by the state legislature.

Massachusetts unanimously voted for independent candidate and incumbent president, George Washington. The total vote is composed of 20,343 for Federalist electors, all of whom were supportive of Washington.

== Results by presidential candidates ==
1792 United States presidential election in Massachusetts
| Party | Candidate | Votes | % |
|---|---|---|---|
| Independent | George Washington | 5,606 | 100.00% |
| Total votes | | 5,606 | 100.00% |

=== Results by county ===
1792 United States presidential election in Massachusetts
| County | George Washington Independent | | Margin | | Total (Note: Results for George Washington are taken from the highest voted elector with either a formal ticket pledge, or a submitted electoral vote, for each township.) |
| County | # | % | # | % | Total |
|---|---|---|---|---|---|
| Barnstable | 176 | 100.00% | 176 | 100.00% | 176 |
| Berkshire | 345 | 100.00% | 345 | 100.00% | 345 |
| Bristol | 325 | 100.00% | 325 | 100.00% | 325 |
| Cumberland | 109 | 100.00% | 109 | 100.00% | 109 |
| Dukes | 46 | 100.00% | 46 | 100.00% | 46 |
| Essex | 494 | 100.00% | 494 | 100.00% | 494 |
| Hancock | 13 | 100.00% | 13 | 100.00% | 13 |
| Hampshire | 773 | 100.00% | 773 | 100.00% | 773 |
| Lincoln | 271 | 100.00% | 271 | 100.00% | 271 |
| Middlesex | 739 | 100.00% | 739 | 100.00% | 739 |
| Nantucket | 109 | 100.00% | 109 | 100.00% | 109 |
| Plymouth | 174 | 100.00% | 174 | 100.00% | 174 |
| Suffolk | 1,051 | 100.00% | 1,051 | 100.00% | 1,051 |
| Washington | 47 | 100.00% | 47 | 100.00% | 47 |
| Worcester | 817 | 100.00% | 817 | 100.00% | 817 |
| York | 117 | 100.00% | 117 | 100.00% | 117 |
| Total | 5,606 | 100.00% | 5,606 | 100.00% | 5,606 |

=== Results by district ===
1792 United States presidential election in Massachusetts
| District | E.V. | George Washington Independent | | | Margin | | Total (Note: Results for George Washington are taken from the highest voted elector with either a formal ticket pledge, or a submitted electoral vote, for each township.) |
| District | E.V. | # | % | E.V. | # | % | Total |
|---|---|---|---|---|---|---|---|
| Middle | 5 | 2,284 | 100.00% | 5 | 2,284 | 100.00% | 2,284 |
| Western | 5 | 1,935 | 100.00% | 5 | 1,935 | 100.00% | 1,935 |
| Southern | 3 | 830 | 100.00% | 3 | 830 | 100.00% | 830 |
| Eastern | 3 | 557 | 100.00% | 3 | 557 | 100.00% | 557 |
| Total | 16 | 5,606 | 100.00% | 16 | 5,606 | 100.00% | 5,606 |

== Results by presidential electors ==
1792 United States presidential election in Massachusetts
| Party | Candidate | Votes | % |
|---|---|---|---|
| Federalist | Federalist electors | 6,361 | 78.79% |
| Democratic-Republican | Democratic-Republican electors | 1,712 | 21.21% |
| Total votes | | 8,073 | 100.00% |

=== Results by county ===
1792 United States presidential election in Massachusetts
| County | Federalist electors | | Democratic-Republican electors | | Margin | | Total (Note: Aggregrated by highest voted elector per township.) |
| County | # | % | # | % | # | % | Total |
|---|---|---|---|---|---|---|---|
| Barnstable | 186 | 100.00% | 0 | 0.00% | 186 | 100.00% | 186 |
| Berkshire | 416 | 80.93% | 98 | 19.07% | 318 | 61.86% | 514 |
| Bristol | 400 | 71.43% | 160 | 28.57% | 240 | 42.86% | 560 |
| Cumberland | 297 | 99.66% | 1 | 0.34% | 296 | 99.32% | 298 |
| Dukes | 46 | 100.00% | 0 | 0.00% | 46 | 100.00% | 46 |
| Essex | 494 | 88.53% | 64 | 11.47% | 430 | 77.06% | 558 |
| Hancock | 13 | 100.00% | 0 | 0.00% | 13 | 100.00% | 13 |
| Hampshire | 826 | 80.04% | 206 | 19.96% | 620 | 60.08% | 1,032 |
| Lincoln | 408 | 100.00% | 0 | 0.00% | 408 | 100.00% | 408 |
| Middlesex | 808 | 63.27% | 469 | 36.73% | 339 | 26.54% | 1,277 |
| Nantucket | 109 | 100.00% | 0 | 0.00% | 109 | 100.00% | 109 |
| Plymouth | 222 | 99.55% | 1 | 0.45% | 221 | 99.10% | 223 |
| Suffolk | 1,053 | 70.34% | 444 | 29.66% | 609 | 40.68% | 1,497 |
| Washington | 47 | 100.00% | 0 | 0.00% | 47 | 100.00% | 47 |
| Worcester | 845 | 77.31% | 248 | 22.69% | 597 | 54.62% | 1,093 |
| York | 191 | 90.09% | 21 | 9.91% | 170 | 80.18% | 212 |
| Total | 6,361 | 78.79% | 1,712 | 21.21% | 4,649 | 57.58% | 8,073 |

==== Results by county swing ====
Swing compared to the 1788-89 election
| County | Party | | Status |
| County | Federalist | Democratic-Republican / Anti-Federalist (Note: Swing data compares Democratic-Republican performance to previous Anti-Federalist performance. The Democratic-Republican party is considered to be the direct evolution of the Anti-Federalist coalition.) | Status |
| County | ± pp | ± pp | Status |
|---|---|---|---|
| Barnstable | 0.00 pp | 0.00 pp | Hold |
| Berkshire | ▼3.48 pp | ▲3.48 pp | Loss |
| Bristol | ▲6.33 pp | ▼6.33 pp | Gain |
| Cumberland | ▼0.34 pp | ▲0.34 pp | Loss |
| Dukes | 0.00 pp | 0.00 pp | Hold |
| Essex | ▲1.86 pp | ▼1.86 pp | Gain |
| Hancock | No data | No data | New |
| Hampshire | ▼7.33 pp | ▲7.33 pp | Loss |
| Lincoln | ▲61.65 pp | ▼61.65 pp | Flip |
| Middlesex | ▼26.16 pp | ▲26.16 pp | Loss |
| Nantucket | 0.00 pp | 0.00 pp | Hold |
| Plymouth | ▲0.71 pp | ▼0.71 pp | Gain |
| Suffolk | ▼12.32 pp | ▲12.32 pp | Loss |
| Washington | No data | No data | New |
| Worcester | ▲18.27 pp | ▼18.27 pp | Gain |
| York | ▲21.60 pp | ▼21.60 pp | Gain |
| Total | ▲0.38 pp | ▼0.38 pp | Gain |

=== Results by district ===
1792 United States presidential election in Massachusetts
| District | E.V. | Federalist electors | | | Democratic-Republican electors | | | Margin | | Total |
| District | E.V. | # | % | E.V. | # | % | E.V. | # | % | Total |
|---|---|---|---|---|---|---|---|---|---|---|
| Middle | 5 | 2,355 | 70.68% | 5 | 977 | 29.32% | 0 | 1,378 | 41.36% | 3,332 |
| Western | 5 | 2,087 | 79.08% | 5 | 552 | 20.92% | 0 | 1,535 | 58.16% | 2,639 |
| Southern | 3 | 963 | 85.68% | 3 | 161 | 14.32% | 0 | 802 | 71.36% | 1,124 |
| Eastern | 3 | 956 | 97.75% | 3 | 22 | 2.25% | 0 | 934 | 95.50% | 978 |
| Total | 16 | 6,361 | 78.79% | 16 | 1,712 | 21.21% | 0 | 4,649 | 57.58% | 8,073 |

=== Results by elector ===
1792 United States presidential election in Massachusetts's 1st congressional district: Middle
| Party | Candidate | Votes | % |
|---|---|---|---|
| Federalist | Azor Orne (Note: Pro-Administration elector for this election.) | 2,022 | 16.61% |
| Federalist | Francis Dana | 1,339 | 11.00% |
| Federalist | Increase Sumner | 1,301 | 10.69% |
| Federalist | Thomas Dawes (Note: Pro-Administration elector for this election. Failed to reach a majority of votes and was subsequently selected to be a presidential elector by the Massachusetts General Court.) | 1,086 | 8.92% |
| Federalist | Samuel Phillips Jr. (Note: Federalist candidate for the Massachusetts state senate in 1788 and 1796. No documented political/oppositional shift noted during the 1790s.) | 1,012 | 8.31% |
| Federalist | Samuel Holten | 809 | 6.65% |
| Democratic-Republican | Charles Jarvis (Note: Anti-Administration candidate for 3rd United States Congress (1793-1795). Had political principles that were "decidedly republican".) | 645 | 5.30% |
| Federalist | Eleazer Brooks (Note: Supporter of the federal constitution. Federalist candidate for the Massachusetts state senate in 1789 and 1796. No documented political/oppositional shift noted during the 1790s.) | 623 | 5.12% |
| Federalist | Theophilus Parsons (Note: Federalist elector for this election.) | 459 | 3.77% |
| Unknown | Richard Devens | 375 | 3.08% |
| Federalist | Thomas Russell (Note: Outspoken supporter and advocate for the federal constitution. Approved of Jay's treaty in a letter of correspondence to George Washington, dated 1795. No documented political/oppositional shift noted during the 1790s.) | 343 | 2.82% |
| Federalist | John Coffin Jones Sr. (Note: Supported the federal constitution and was a federalist candidate for the Massachusetts senate in 1796. In a 1791 letter of correspondence, Henry Knox, founding father and federalist, was asked by federalist Henry Jackson, to use his influence to secure Jones a directorship role of Alexander Hamilton's First Bank of the United States.) | 238 | 1.96% |
| Democratic-Republican | Samuel Adams (Note: Democratic-Republican governor, serving from 1793-1797. Anti-Federalist candidate who transitioned into a Democratic-Republican in national politics after 1789.) | 214 | 1.76% |
| Unknown | William Heath | 198 | 1.63% |
| Unknown | Ebenezer Bridge | 124 | 1.02% |
| Democratic-Republican | Thomas Dawes Jr. (Note: Anti-Administration candidate for 2nd United States Congress (1791-1793).) | 118 | 0.97% |
| Democratic-Republican | James Winthrop (Note: Anti-Federalist candidate who transitioned into a Democratic-Republican in national politics after 1789.) | 105 | 0.86% |
| Unknown | Joseph Warner | 92 | 0.76% |
| Federalist | Caleb Davis (Note: Supported the federal constitution. Listed as a director for Alexander Hamilton's First Bank of the United States in 1792. No documented political/oppositional shift noted during the 1790s.) | 73 | 0.60% |
| Democratic-Republican | James Sullivan (Note: Identified with the Republicans in a 1793 letter of correspondence to Thomas Jefferson. Transitioned into a Democratic-Republican in national politics after 1789.) | 72 | 0.59% |
| Federalist | Samuel Dexter | 71 | 0.58% |
| Unknown | Oliver Prescott | 70 | 0.58% |
| Unknown | Joseph B. Varnum | 66 | 0.54% |
| Unknown | Jabez Fisher | 56 | 0.46% |
| Unknown | Oliver Wendell | 47 | 0.39% |
| Unknown | William Eustis | 42 | 0.35% |
| Unknown | Seth Bullard | 41 | 0.34% |
| Federalist | Harrison Gray Otis | 38 | 0.31% |
| Federalist | William Shepard (Note: Federlaist elector who supported George Washington, and John Adams for vice president in 1788-89. In a letter of correspondence to George Washington dated 1791, William Shepard refers to himself in third person as a "cordial friend of the Government", while seeking an appointment from Washinhgton. Was later a federalist candidate for the Massachusetts senate in 1796. No documented political/oppositional shift noted during the 1790s.) | 34 | 0.28% |
| Unknown | Stephen Choate | 33 | 0.27% |
| Unknown | Leonard Jarvis | 31 | 0.25% |
| Democratic-Republican | Benjamin Austin Jr. (Note: Anti-Federalist candidate who transitioned into a Democratic-Republican in national politics after 1789.) | 30 | 0.24% |
| Unknown | Edward H. Robbins | 30 | 0.24% |
| Unknown | Robert Treat Paine | 30 | 0.24% |
| Federalist | John Brooks | 28 | 0.23% |
| Federalist | Tristram Dalton (Note: Pro-Administration representative for the Massachusetts senate, who served from 1788-1791. Federalist candidate in national politics after 1789.) | 25 | 0.21% |
| Federalist | Cotton Tufts (Note: Federalist delegate and supporter of the new federal constitution. Showed continued support and endorsement of the Washington-Adams led government in a 1791 letter of correspondence to John Adams. No documented political/oppositional shift noted during the 1790s.) | 22 | 0.18% |
| Unknown | Thomas Durfee | 22 | 0.18% |
| Democratic-Republican | Elbridge Gerry (Note: Anti-Administration candidate serving from 1789-1791. Democratic-Republican candidate serving from 1791-1793.) | 21 | 0.17% |
| Unknown | Theophilus Bradbury | 20 | 0.16% |
| Unknown | James Prescott | 14 | 0.12% |
| Unknown | Loammi Baldwin | 13 | 0.11% |
| Unknown | Zebadiah Wyman | 12 | 0.10% |
| Federalist | Daniel Whitney (Note: Supported the federal constitution. Was later a federalist candidate for the Massachusetts senate in 1796. No documented political/oppositional shift noted during the 1790s.) | 11 | 0.09% |
| Unknown | Ebenezer Thayer Jr. | 11 | 0.09% |
| Unknown | Israel Hutchinson | 11 | 0.09% |
| Federalist | James Bowdoin (Note: Federalist who remained a federalist in national politics after 1789.) | 11 | 0.09% |
| Unknown | Richard Ward | 11 | 0.09% |
| Unknown | William Shepard | 11 | 0.09% |
| Federalist | David Cobb (Note: Pro-Administration representative for 3rd United States Congress (1793-1795). Described as being a "federalist in politics, he was distinguished for his love of order and his attachment to the Constitution".) | 9 | 0.07% |
| Federalist | John Hancock (Note: Federalist governor, serving from 1787-1793.) | 7 | 0.06% |
| Unknown | Nathaniel Cophape | 6 | 0.05% |
| Unknown | Francis Faulkner | 5 | 0.04% |
| Unknown | James Warner | 5 | 0.04% |
| Unknown | John Read | 3 | 0.02% |
| Unknown | Josiah Whitney | 3 | 0.02% |
| Federalist | Samuel Sewall | 2 | 0.02% |
| Federalist | Benjamin Goodhue | 2 | 0.02% |
| Unknown | Ebenezer Wales | 2 | 0.02% |
| Federalist | Fisher Ames | 2 | 0.02% |
| Unknown | James Baker | 2 | 0.02% |
| Unknown | Stephen Cross | 2 | 0.02% |
| Federalist | Stephen Higginson | 2 | 0.02% |
| Unknown | William Hull | 2 | 0.02% |
| Unknown | Benjamin Hichborn | 1 | 0.01% |
| Unknown | Isaac Packard | 1 | 0.01% |
| Unknown | Jeremiah Bumstead | 1 | 0.01% |
| Unknown | John Avery Jr. | 1 | 0.01% |
| Unknown | Levi Lincoln | 1 | 0.01% |
| Unknown | Richard French | 1 | 0.01% |
| Unknown | Thomas Edwards | 1 | 0.01% |
| Total votes | | 12,171 | 100.00% |

1792 United States presidential election in Massachusetts's 2nd congressional district: Western
| Party | Candidate | Votes | % |
|---|---|---|---|
| Federalist | William Shepard (Note: Pro-Administration elector for this election. Failed to reach a majority of votes and was subsequently selected to be a presidential elector by the Massachusetts General Court.) | 979 | 8.74% |
| Federalist | Moses Gill | 787 | 7.02% |
| Unknown | Elijah Dwight | 742 | 6.62% |
| Federalist | Dwight Foster | 740 | 6.60% |
| Federalist | Thompson J. Skinner | 739 | 6.59% |
| Federalist | Samuel Henshaw (Note: Strong supporter of the federal constitution. Federalist James Bowdoin recommended Henshaw for a federal appointment in the Revenue Department, in a letter of correspondence to George Washington, dated 1790. Bowdoin went on to describe Henshaw as being a "good friend to the federal government". No documented political/oppositional shift noted during the 1790s.) | 593 | 5.29% |
| Unknown | Simeon Strong | 588 | 5.25% |
| Unknown | Levi Lincoln Sr. | 403 | 3.60% |
| Federalist | Ebenezer Mattoon Jr. | 354 | 3.16% |
| Unknown | Nathaniel Bishop | 353 | 3.15% |
| Democratic-Republican | Martin Kinsley (Note: Voted against the new federal constitution. Anti-federalist candidate for the Massachusetts state senate in 1789, and then a Democratic-Republican candidate for the Massachusetts state senate in 1796. No documented political/oppositional shift noted during the 1790s.) | 345 | 3.08% |
| Unknown | Abel Wilder | 277 | 2.47% |
| Unknown | David Smead | 277 | 2.47% |
| Federalist | John Bacon (Note: Federalist partisan in politics during the early 1790s.) | 269 | 2.40% |
| Unknown | Samuel Fowler | 265 | 2.36% |
| Unknown | Daniel Bigelow | 261 | 2.33% |
| Unknown | Samuel Flagg | 204 | 1.82% |
| Democratic-Republican | Jonathan Grout (Note: Anti-Administration representative, for 1st United States Congress (1789-1791). Voted against Alexander Hamilton's First Bank of the United States in 1791. Anti-Administration candidate for 3rd United States Congress (1793-1795). No documented political/oppositional shift noted during the 1790s.) | 186 | 1.66% |
| Unknown | Samuel Baker | 176 | 1.57% |
| Democratic-Republican | William Lyman (Note: Anti-Administration representative for the 3rd United States Congress (1793-1795).) | 172 | 1.53% |
| Federalist | Samuel Lyman (Note: Federalist elector for this election.) | 166 | 1.48% |
| Unknown | Justin Ely | 162 | 1.45% |
| Unknown | Warham Parks | 154 | 1.37% |
| Unknown | John Hastings | 145 | 1.29% |
| Unknown | Jonathan Warner | 124 | 1.11% |
| Unknown | Timothy Paine | 120 | 1.07% |
| Unknown | Ebenezer Hunt | 119 | 1.06% |
| Unknown | William Williams | 119 | 1.06% |
| Federalist | Thomas Dwight | 117 | 1.04% |
| Unknown | Timothy Edwards | 112 | 1.00% |
| Unknown | John Williams | 109 | 0.97% |
| Federalist | Artemas Ward | 83 | 0.74% |
| Unknown | Hugh M. Dalton | 77 | 0.69% |
| Unknown | Nathaniel Paine | 73 | 0.65% |
| Unknown | Benjamin Reed | 55 | 0.49% |
| Unknown | Salem Towne Sr. | 48 | 0.43% |
| Unknown | Noah Goodman | 47 | 0.42% |
| Unknown | Timothy Newell | 41 | 0.37% |
| Unknown | Peter Tomeman | 39 | 0.35% |
| Unknown | William Skinner Sr. | 38 | 0.34% |
| Unknown | Unreadable | 37 | 0.33% |
| Unknown | John Sprague | 30 | 0.27% |
| Unknown | William Billings | 30 | 0.27% |
| Federalist | Thomas Ives (Note: Federalist i. Described as being a zealous federalist in politics.) | 29 | 0.26% |
| Unknown | Joseph Davis | 26 | 0.23% |
| Unknown | Adam Plank | 24 | 0.21% |
| Unknown | Joseph Allen | 24 | 0.21% |
| Unknown | William Pynchon | 24 | 0.21% |
| Unknown | Ebenezer Fisher | 23 | 0.21% |
| Unknown | Ezekiel Kellogg | 21 | 0.19% |
| Unknown | Benjamin Wilson | 20 | 0.18% |
| Unknown | Henry Dwight | 20 | 0.18% |
| Unknown | Seth Ediman | 16 | 0.14% |
| Unknown | Ezekial Warrick | 15 | 0.13% |
| Unknown | Henry Bromfield | 15 | 0.13% |
| Unknown | Benjamin Joslyn | 14 | 0.12% |
| Unknown | John Fessenden | 14 | 0.12% |
| Unknown | Solomon Stoddard | 12 | 0.11% |
| Unknown | Thomas Denny | 12 | 0.11% |
| Unknown | Timothy Robinson | 12 | 0.11% |
| Unknown | John Black | 11 | 0.10% |
| Unknown | John S. Skinner | 10 | 0.09% |
| Unknown | Caleb Ammidown | 8 | 0.07% |
| Unknown | Elijah Brigham | 7 | 0.06% |
| Unknown | John Goldberry | 7 | 0.06% |
| Unknown | Thomas Grout | 7 | 0.06% |
| Unknown | Simon Larned | 6 | 0.05% |
| Federalist | Theodore Sedgwick | 6 | 0.05% |
| Unknown | Danforth Keyes | 5 | 0.04% |
| Unknown | Seth Levenford | 5 | 0.04% |
| Unknown | Timothy Childs | 5 | 0.04% |
| Unknown | John Ashley | 4 | 0.04% |
| Unknown | Joshua Bigelow | 4 | 0.04% |
| Unknown | Solomon Leland | 4 | 0.04% |
| Unknown | Joseph Sargent | 3 | 0.03% |
| Unknown | Stephen Rice | 3 | 0.03% |
| Unknown | Waltham Walker | 3 | 0.03% |
| Unknown | Andrew Peters | 2 | 0.02% |
| Unknown | Barnabas Bidwell | 2 | 0.02% |
| Unknown | John Bisco | 2 | 0.02% |
| Unknown | Abner Morgan | 1 | 0.01% |
| Unknown | Benjamin Greene | 1 | 0.01% |
| Federalist | Bezaleel Taft Sr. (Note: Described as being a federalist who never swayed from his political faith.) | 1 | 0.01% |
| Unknown | Daniel Holt | 1 | 0.01% |
| Unknown | Daniel Willard | 1 | 0.01% |
| Unknown | David Bigelow | 1 | 0.01% |
| Unknown | Ebenezer Lombard | 1 | 0.01% |
| Unknown | Elijah Hunt | 1 | 0.01% |
| Unknown | Elisha Fisk | 1 | 0.01% |
| Unknown | Ezra Beams | 1 | 0.01% |
| Unknown | Gideon Wheeler | 1 | 0.01% |
| Unknown | Jacob Veusen | 1 | 0.01% |
| Unknown | James Barr | 1 | 0.01% |
| Unknown | John | 1 | 0.01% |
| Unknown | John Bliss | 1 | 0.01% |
| Unknown | John Dodds | 1 | 0.01% |
| Unknown | John Hubbard | 1 | 0.01% |
| Unknown | Justus Ashmun | 1 | 0.01% |
| Unknown | Moses Bliss | 1 | 0.01% |
| Unknown | Robert Breck | 1 | 0.01% |
| Federalist | Samuel Phillips Jr. | 1 | 0.01% |
| Unknown | Samuel Robinson | 1 | 0.01% |
| Unknown | Stephen Sibley | 1 | 0.01% |
| Unknown | Timothy Fuller | 1 | 0.01% |
| Unknown | William King | 1 | 0.01% |
| Unknown | Unreadable | 1 | 0.01% |
| Total votes | | 11,206 | 100.00% |

1792 United States presidential election in Massachusetts's 3rd congressional district: Southern
| Party | Candidate | Votes | % |
|---|---|---|---|
| Federalist | Walter Spooner (Note: Federalist elector for this election. Described as being an earnest federalist when party lines were first drawn after the settlement of the government.) | 728 | 21.51% |
| Federalist | William Sever (Note: Federalist elector for this election. Described as being an ardent federalist, and opposed Thomas Jefferson.) | 582 | 17.20% |
| Federalist | Solomon Freeman (Note: Federalist elector for this election. Failed to reach a majority of votes and was subsequently selected to be a presidential elector by the Massachusetts General Court. Supported the federal constitution and was a federalist candidate for the Massachusetts state senate in 1796.) | 472 | 13.95% |
| Unknown | Samuel Savage | 154 | 4.55% |
| Democratic-Republican | Phanuel Bishop (Note: Anti-Federalist candidate who transitioned into a Democratic-Republican in national politics after 1789.) | 145 | 4.28% |
| Democratic-Republican | James Warren | 132 | 3.90% |
| Federalist | George Partridge (Note: Pro-Administration representative for 1st United States Congress (1789-1791). Voted yes for Alexander Hamilton's First Bank of the United States in 1791.) | 126 | 3.72% |
| Unknown | Holder Slocum | 120 | 3.55% |
| Federalist | David Cobb | 98 | 2.90% |
| Federalist | David Thacher (Note: Supporter of the federal constitution. Later ran as a federalist candidate for the Massachusetts state senate in 1799. No documented political/oppositional shift noted during the 1790s.) | 97 | 2.87% |
| Federalist | Elisha May (Note: Supporter of the federal constitution. Later ran as a federalist elector for the Massachusetts presidential election in 1796. No documented political/oppositional shift noted during the 1790s.) | 80 | 2.36% |
| Unknown | Thomas Durfee | 74 | 2.19% |
| Federalist | Peleg Coffin Jr. (Note: Pro-Administration representative for the 3rd United States Congress (1793-1795).) | 69 | 2.04% |
| Federalist | John Davis (Note: Supporter of the federal constitution. Described as acquiring a reputation as a firm and wise federalist that caught the eye of national figures. Federalist candidate for the 3rd United States Congress (1793-1795). No documented political/oppositional shift noted during the 1790s.) | 68 | 2.01% |
| Unknown | Joshua Thomas | 60 | 1.77% |
| Unknown | Seth Padelford | 42 | 1.24% |
| Unknown | Christopher Sharon | 31 | 0.92% |
| Unknown | William Jernigan | 31 | 0.92% |
| Federalist | Isaac Thompson (Note: Supporter of the federal constitution. Federalist candidate for the Massachusetts senate in 1796. No documented political/oppositional shift noted during the 1790s.) | 29 | 0.86% |
| Unknown | Ephraim Starkweather | 26 | 0.77% |
| Unknown | Daniel Davis | 24 | 0.71% |
| Unknown | Nathan Cushing | 24 | 0.71% |
| Unknown | Ephraim Spooner | 22 | 0.65% |
| Unknown | Jeremiah Hall | 19 | 0.56% |
| Unknown | Abiel Mitchell | 14 | 0.41% |
| Unknown | Elijah Knowles | 14 | 0.41% |
| Unknown | Samuel Smith | 13 | 0.38% |
| Federalist | William Balis (Note: Federalist elector for this election.) | 13 | 0.38% |
| Unknown | Jerathmeal Bowers | 10 | 0.30% |
| Unknown | William Jonakins | 10 | 0.30% |
| Unknown | James Sproat | 9 | 0.27% |
| Unknown | James Athearn | 7 | 0.21% |
| Unknown | Joseph Bryant | 7 | 0.21% |
| Unknown | Josiah Smith | 6 | 0.18% |
| Unknown | Aaron Hobart | 5 | 0.15% |
| Unknown | Francis Shurtleff | 4 | 0.12% |
| Unknown | James Whitman | 4 | 0.12% |
| Unknown | Samuel Tobey | 4 | 0.12% |
| Unknown | Ebenezer Taylor | 3 | 0.09% |
| Unknown | Andrew Croswell | 1 | 0.03% |
| Unknown | Enoch Freeman | 1 | 0.03% |
| Unknown | Gamaliel Bradford | 1 | 0.03% |
| Unknown | John Balis | 1 | 0.03% |
| Unknown | John Ball | 1 | 0.03% |
| Unknown | Nathaniel Goodwin | 1 | 0.03% |
| Unknown | Samuel Cole | 1 | 0.03% |
| Unknown | William Hall Jackson | 1 | 0.03% |
| Total votes | | 3,384 | 100.00% |

1792 United States presidential election in Massachusetts's 4th congressional district: Eastern
| Party | Candidate | Votes | % |
|---|---|---|---|
| Federalist | Thomas Rice (Note: Supporter of the federal constitution. Federalist elector for the Massachusetts presidential election in 1796. No documented political/oppositional shift noted during the 1790s.) | 409 | 12.18% |
| Federalist | Nathaniel Wells (Note: Pro-Administration elector for this election. Failed to reach a majority of votes and was subsequently selected to be a presidential elector by the Massachusetts General Court.) | 372 | 11.07% |
| Federalist | Daniel Coney | 264 | 7.86% |
| Unknown | Edward Cutts | 247 | 7.35% |
| Federalist | Peleg Wadsworth | 168 | 5.00% |
| Federalist | John Kilby Smith (Note: Supporter of the federal constitution. Federalist candidate for the Massachusetts state senate in 1796. No documented political/oppositional shift noted during the 1790s.) | 160 | 4.76% |
| Unknown | Nathaniel Tacking | 150 | 4.47% |
| Unknown | John Frothingham | 124 | 3.69% |
| Unknown | Josiah Thatcher | 106 | 3.16% |
| Unknown | Dummer Sewall | 79 | 2.35% |
| Unknown | David Mitchell | 77 | 2.29% |
| Unknown | Samuel Thompson | 77 | 2.29% |
| Federalist | Ichabod Goodwin (Note: A loyal patriot throughout the Revolutionary War and staunch federalist thereafter. Later led the townsmen of Berwick in offering grand toasts to the newly inaugurarted president, John Adams in 1797. No documented political/oppositional shift noted during the 1790s.) | 75 | 2.23% |
| Unknown | Daniel Davis | 74 | 2.20% |
| Unknown | Alexander Campbell | 69 | 2.05% |
| Unknown | Phineas Bruce | 64 | 1.91% |
| Unknown | Tristram Jordan | 64 | 1.91% |
| Federalist | Stephen Longfellow (Note: Federalist elector for this election.) | 58 | 1.73% |
| Unknown | Joseph Noyes | 56 | 1.67% |
| Unknown | John Frost | 53 | 1.58% |
| Federalist | Samuel Freeman (Note: Described as being a firm, but temperate federalist in his political sentiments. Removed from his position as first postmaster of Portland near Thomas Jefferson's first term as president, due to being unwilling to sacrifice his federal principals for office. No documented political/oppositional shift noted during the 1790s.) | 47 | 1.40% |
| Unknown | Samuel Nasson | 46 | 1.37% |
| Unknown | Thomas Cutts | 44 | 1.31% |
| Unknown | John Storer | 40 | 1.19% |
| Unknown | Daniel Sewall | 36 | 1.07% |
| Unknown | John Fox | 34 | 1.01% |
| Unknown | Andrew Dunning | 30 | 0.89% |
| Unknown | Waterman Thomas | 26 | 0.77% |
| Unknown | Jordan Parker | 24 | 0.71% |
| Unknown | David Silvester | 23 | 0.68% |
| Unknown | Samuel Merrit | 21 | 0.63% |
| Unknown | Sanderson Jordan | 21 | 0.63% |
| Unknown | Enoch Freeman | 20 | 0.60% |
| Unknown | Isaac Snow | 18 | 0.54% |
| Federalist | George Thatcher (Note: Federalist elector for this election.) | 16 | 0.48% |
| Unknown | John Gardiner | 16 | 0.48% |
| Unknown | John Lewis | 14 | 0.42% |
| Unknown | Joseph Tucker | 14 | 0.42% |
| Unknown | John Farley | 12 | 0.36% |
| Democratic-Republican | William Widgery (Note: Anti-Federalist candidate who transitioned into a Democratic-Republican in national politics after 1789.) | 12 | 0.36% |
| Unknown | George Warren | 11 | 0.33% |
| Democratic-Republican | Henry Dearborn (Note: Anti-Administration representative for the 3rd United States Congress (1793-1795).) | 10 | 0.30% |
| Unknown | Simon Frye | 10 | 0.30% |
| Unknown | John Waite | 9 | 0.27% |
| Unknown | Nathan James | 8 | 0.24% |
| Unknown | Nathaniel Thurston | 7 | 0.21% |
| Unknown | Asni S. Fernald | 6 | 0.18% |
| Unknown | John Hovey | 6 | 0.18% |
| Unknown | John Peterson | 4 | 0.12% |
| Unknown | Gabriel Johonnot | 3 | 0.09% |
| Unknown | Nathaniel Thwing | 3 | 0.09% |
| Unknown | William Lithgow | 3 | 0.09% |
| Unknown | William Thompson | 3 | 0.09% |
| Unknown | Benjamin Dunning | 2 | 0.06% |
| Unknown | John Dean | 2 | 0.06% |
| Unknown | Nathan Jones | 2 | 0.06% |
| Unknown | Caleb | 1 | 0.03% |
| Unknown | Daniel Ilsley | 1 | 0.03% |
| Unknown | Hog | 1 | 0.03% |
| Unknown | Isaac Parsons | 1 | 0.03% |
| Unknown | Jonathan Bowman | 1 | 0.03% |
| Unknown | Rishworth Jordan | 1 | 0.03% |
| Unknown | Stephen Hall | 1 | 0.03% |
| Unknown | Thomas B. Waite | 1 | 0.03% |
| Unknown | William Hasty | 1 | 0.03% |
| Unknown | William Vaughan | 1 | 0.03% |
| Total votes | | 3,359 | 100.00% |

== See also ==
- United States presidential elections in Massachusetts
