= General Artemas Ward House =

Historic house in Massachusetts, United States

- U.S. National Register of Historic Places
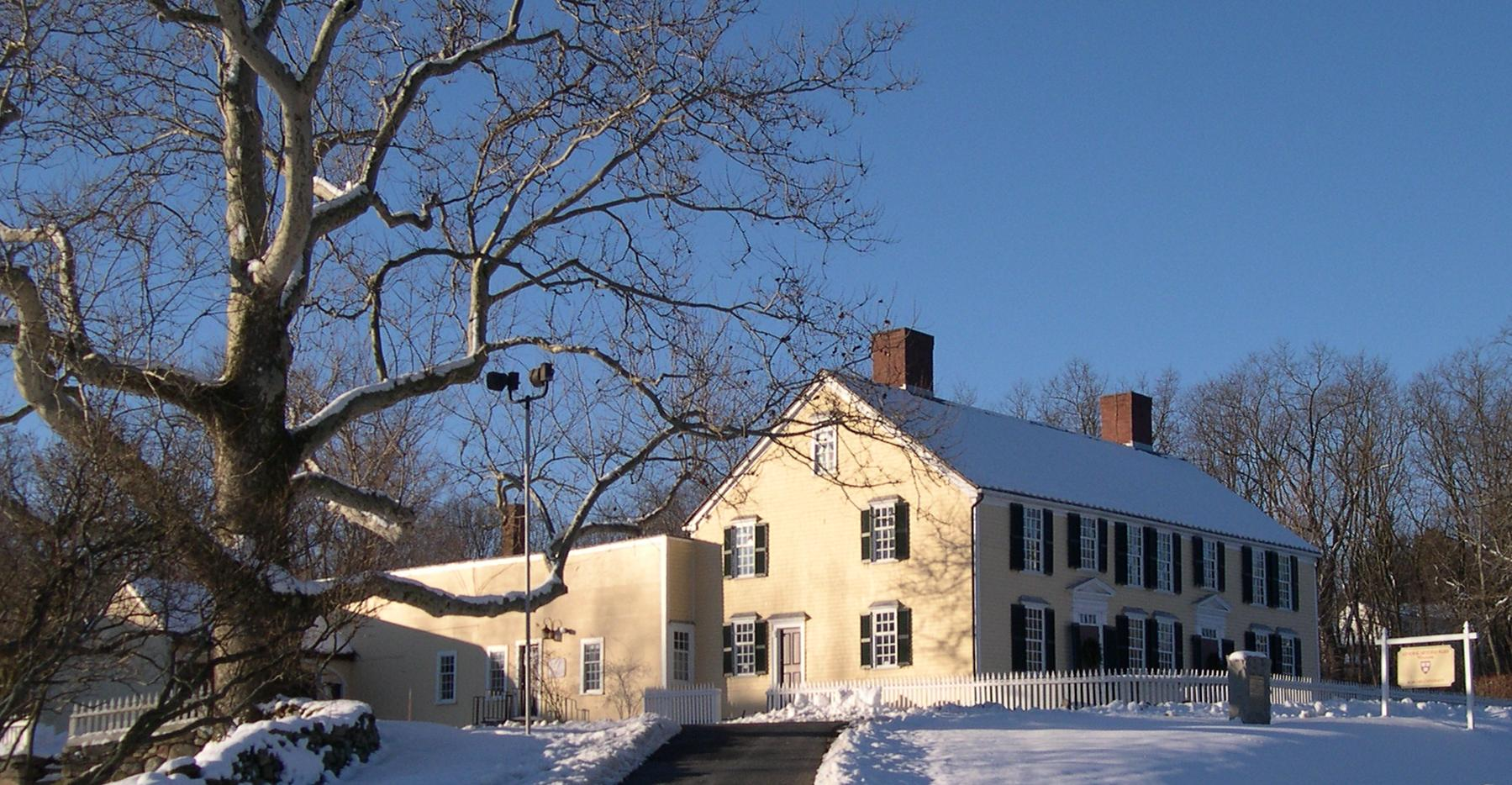
- The Gen. Artemas Ward Homestead in winter

- Location within Massachusetts Location within the United States
- Location: 786 Main St., opposite Dean Park, Shrewsbury, Massachusetts
- Coordinates: 42°17′42″N 71°41′50″W
- Built: 1727
- NRHP reference No.: 76000308
- Added to NRHP: May 4, 1976

The General Artemas Ward House is a historic house at 786 Main Street in Shrewsbury, Massachusetts. Commonly known as the "Artemas Ward House", it was the lifelong home of Artemas Ward, American Major General in the American Revolutionary War and a Congressman from Massachusetts. The house is listed on the National Register of Historic Places.

The house was built by Ward's father, Nahum, in 1727 to house tenants on his farm; Artemas Ward moved into the house in 1763. Its location is along the original Boston Post Road, and an original mile marker of that road is still visible across Main Street on the Dean Park side.

The building was enlarged by the General in 1785, raising the roof and nearly doubling its size, to accommodate the family of his son Thomas Walter Ward alongside his own household. It was enlarged again in 1820 by Thomas Walter Ward, adding a two-story ell to the rear. The main structure was occupied by Ward family members until 1909. From 1909 until 1954 descendants of the general lived in a second structure situated behind the colonial home. The property was donated by the family to Harvard University in 1925.

The home is now operated by Harvard as a museum and is open to the public for limited hours during the summer months. The property also includes a four-story barn. The barn was created by joining two separate barn structures in 1848.

== Gallery ==
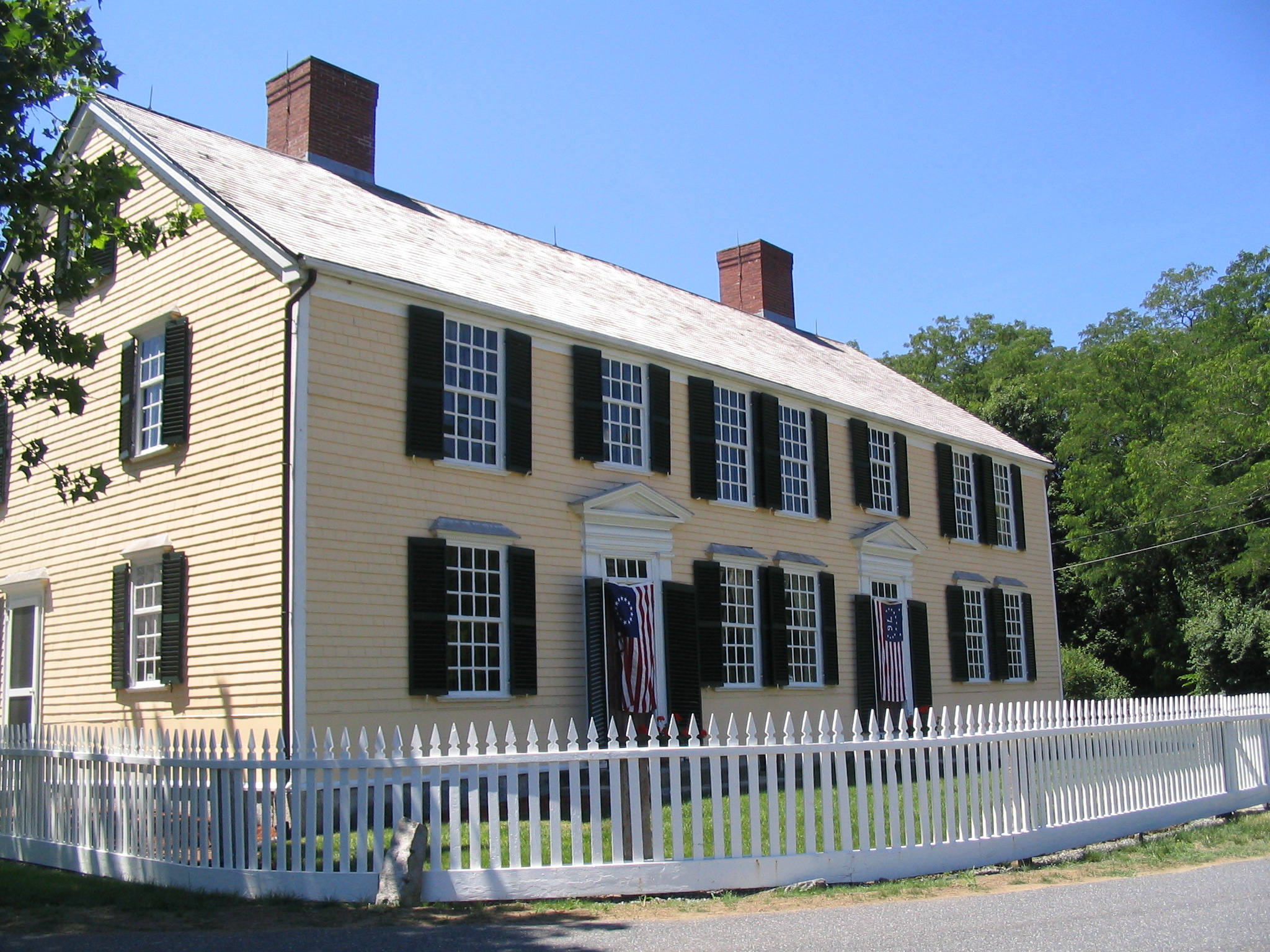
The front of the Artemas Ward House, June 30, 2007

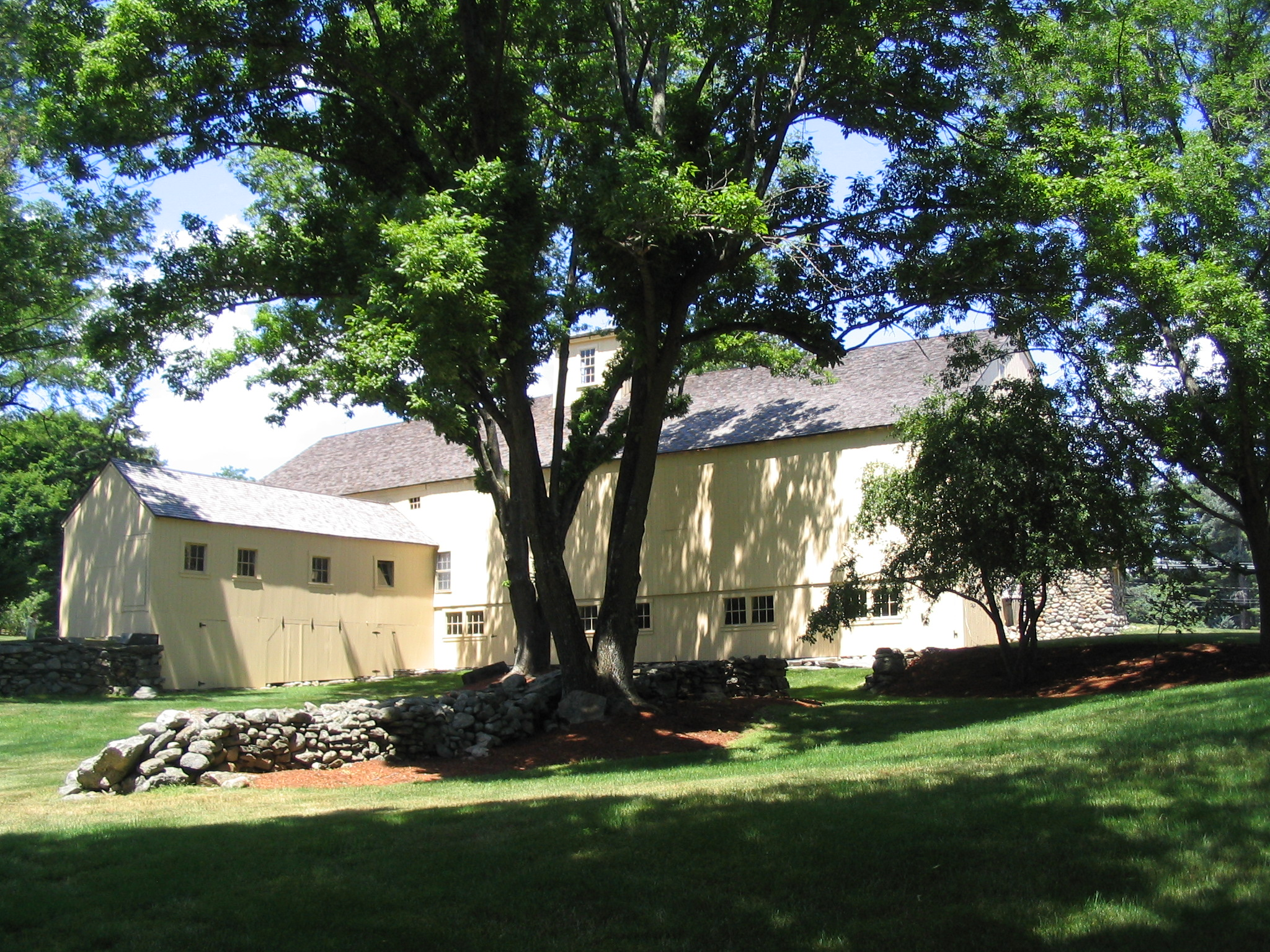
The back of the barn at the Artemas Ward House, June 30, 2007

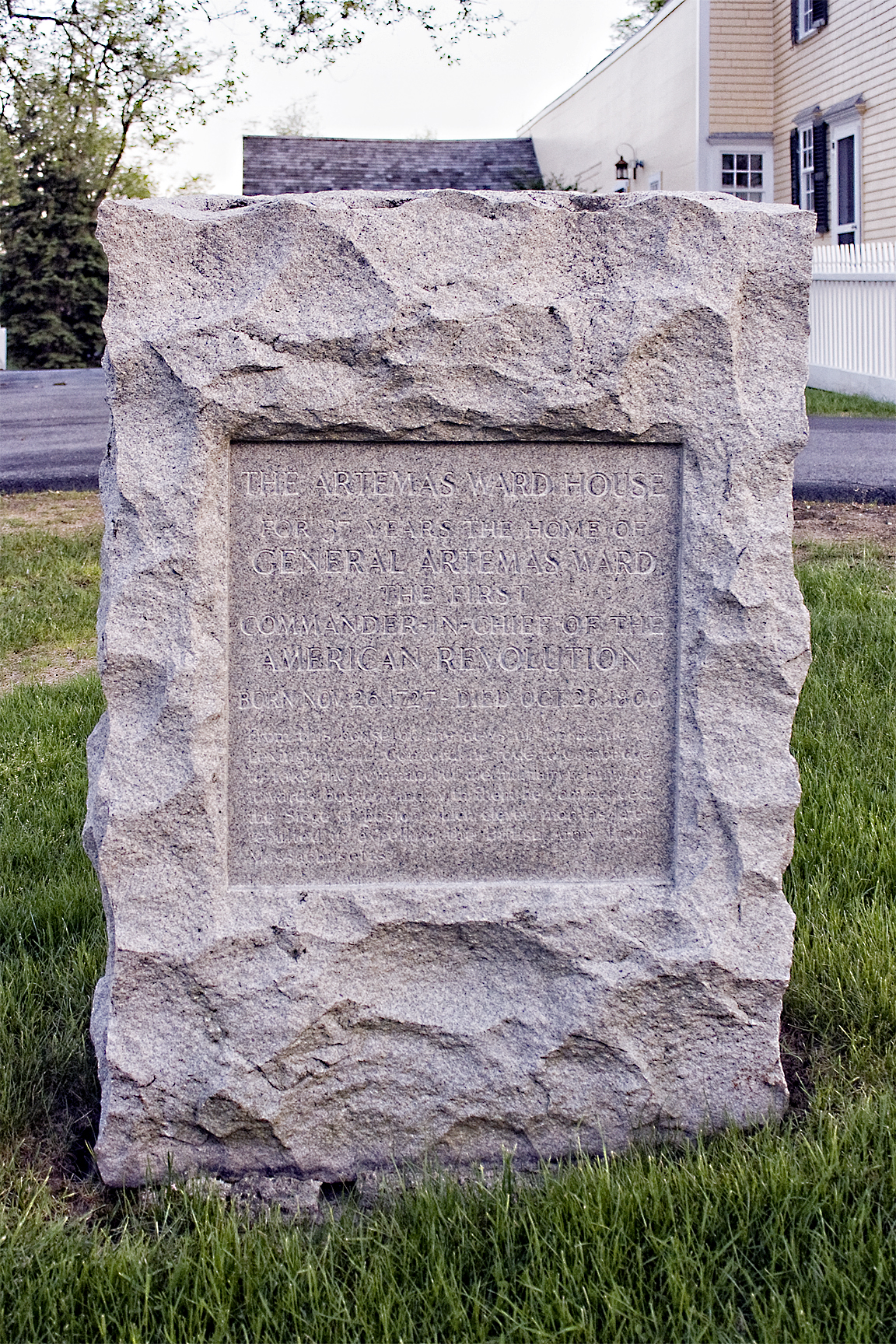
The Memorial Stone at Gen. Artemas Ward Homestead, May 15, 2009

== See also ==
- National Register of Historic Places listings in Worcester County, Massachusetts
