= Samuel Lyman =

American politician

Member of the U.S. House of Representatives from Massachusetts's 3rd district
- In office March 4, 1795 – November 6, 1800
- Preceded by: Shearjashub Bourne; Peleg Coffin Jr. (General ticket)
- Succeeded by: Ebenezer Mattoon

Member of the Massachusetts State Senate
- In office 1790–1793

Personal details
- Born: January 25, 1749 Goshen, Connecticut Colony, British America
- Died: June 5, 1802 (aged 53) Springfield, Massachusetts, U.S.
- Party: Federalist
- Occupation: Lawyer

Samuel Lyman (January 25, 1749 – June 5, 1802) was a United States representative from Massachusetts.

== Early life ==
He was born in Goshen in the Connecticut Colony on January 25, 1749. He was the son of Moses Lyman, III (1713–1768) and Sarah (née Hayden) Lyman (1716–1808). His brother, Moses Lyman, IV (1744–1829) served as a colonel in the American Revolution.

He attended Goshen Academy and graduated from Yale College in 1770. He taught school, studied law in Litchfield, Connecticut, was admitted to the bar and commenced practice in Hartford.

== Life in Massachusetts ==
Lyman moved to Springfield, Massachusetts in 1784, was elected a member of the Massachusetts House of Representatives, and served in the Massachusetts State Senate. He was a justice of the court of common pleas of Hampshire County, and was elected as a Federalist to the Fourth, Fifth, and Sixth Congresses and served from March 4, 1795, until November 6, 1800, when he resigned. He was previously a candidate for the 4th congressional district in 1788; the election took 5 ballots, and Lyman led on the 2nd and 3rd before losing on the final two to Theodore Sedgwick. Lyman sought a rematch in 1790, but lost by a much wider margin. Before his successful election in 1794, he ran once more in 1792 for two of the four seats in Massachusetts's 2nd congressional district: in the at-large seat, he lost to Dwight Foster, and in the Hampshire County seat, he lost to William Lyman (no relation). He died in Springfield on June 5, 1802. His interment was in Goshen, Connecticut.

== Other Family ==
Samuel's sister, Anna Lyman (1746–1842), married Gideon Wheeler (1745–1822), also a veteran of the American Revolution. Their daughter, Ruth, married John Savage, Chief Justice of the New York Supreme Court. They had a daughter, Mary Ann Savage, who married Ward Hunt, United States Supreme Court Justice. Their daughter, Eliza Stringham Hunt, married Arthur Breese Johnson, a great-grandson of President John Adams and great-nephew of President John Quincy Adams.

U.S. House of Representatives
Preceded by General ticket: Shearjashub Bourne, Peleg Coffin, Jr. and David Cobb	Member of the U.S. House of Representatives from Massachusetts's 3rd congressional district March 4, 1795 - November 6, 1800	Succeeded by Ebenezer Mattoon
