= John Kilby Smith =

Continental army officer (1752–1842)

John Kilby Smith (December 17, 1752, Boston, Massachusetts – August 9, 1842, Portland, Maine) was a Continental Army brigadier general from New England, who served in the American Revolution. Smith was an original Member of the Massachusetts Society of the Cincinnati, and his descendants have continued this membership to the current day.

During the Revolutionary War, Smith was aide-de-camp to General Lafayette During the war he was at Ticonderoga and in the Burgoyne and New Jersey campaigns, as well as at Valley Forge, Monmouth with Lafayette, and in Rhode Island under General John Sullivan.

Smith moved to Portland in the last year of the war and resided at the Zebulon Trickey House along with James Means and Josiah Cox. They bought the mast-yard triangle in 1786, and by 1796 Smith had sold his share. He was a general storekeeper with Means of the old George Tate warehouse. John voted yes in the Convention of the Delegates of the People of the Commonwealth of Massachusetts in 1788 to approve adoption of the Constitution of the United States. In January 1791 John wrote a letter to President Washington requesting the position of Inspector General of the district of Main in the state of Massachusetts. By 1792 Smith was an innholder in Newglouster. By 1809 Smith was working at the War Department.

In 1810 Smith was in the New Orleans area scouting for land for the Marquis de Lafayette. In August 1810 he was still active in the War Department. Even though Smith never rose above the rank of brigadier major in the Continental Army, in the Maine Militia he was a general. He also participated in the War of 1812. In April 1818 and again in June 1820, Smith applied for and received a pension; he had served for the entire eight years of the Revolutionary War. After his death in 1842, his children (his wife had died before him) applied for and received his pension as heirs.

== Family ==
Circa 1790 he married Sarah "Sally" Webb Smith, and they had seven children:

- Eben- born in 1792 – listed as the first storekeeper in Poland, Maine
- Henry – born in Portland, Maine 9/12/1794
- John Kilby Jr- born in 1796
- Wiliam W- born in 1/7/1802
- Sally
- Eliza Smith Davis Walker - Mr. Curtis Walker & Mrs. Eliza Davis, both of Thompson Pond Plantation, were m. November 30, 1828, by Eliphalet Dunn, J.P.
- Nancy

The lineage book states that as of 1896, "His diary is in the possession of the family and details of his eight years' service. John also has descendants listed in the Sons of the American Revolution."
