= Daniel Davis (Massachusetts lawyer) =

American attorney

- Born: September 28, 1713; Barnstable, Massachusetts, US
- Died: April 22, 1799; Barnstable, Massachusetts, US
- Burial place: Cobb's Hill Cemetery East and West

Daniel Davis was an American judge and served as Chief Justice of Massachusetts.

== Early life and career ==
Davis was born in 1713 in Barnstable, Massachusetts. He served as judge and Chief Justice of Massachusetts.

Davis also served as the Solicitor General for the Commonwealth of Massachusetts. He represented the First Church and Parish in Dedham in the case of Baker v. Fales.

== Personal life ==
Together with his wife Mehitable, they had two children. Their son, Charles Henry, became a real admiral of the United States navy. Their son, Daniel, later served as the 37th governor of Maine.

Davis died in April 1799 in Barnstable, Massachusetts.

== Works cited ==
- Burke, Arthur, ed. (2009) [1908]. The Prominent Families of the United States of America. Genealogical Publishing Company.
- Wright, Conrad (1988). "The Dedham Case Revisited". Proceedings of the Massachusetts Historical Society. 3. 100. Massachusetts Historical Society: 15–39. JSTOR 25080991.
- Smith, Frank (1936). A History of Dedham, Massachusetts. Transcript Press, Incorporated.
