= Ebenezer Mattoon =

American politician

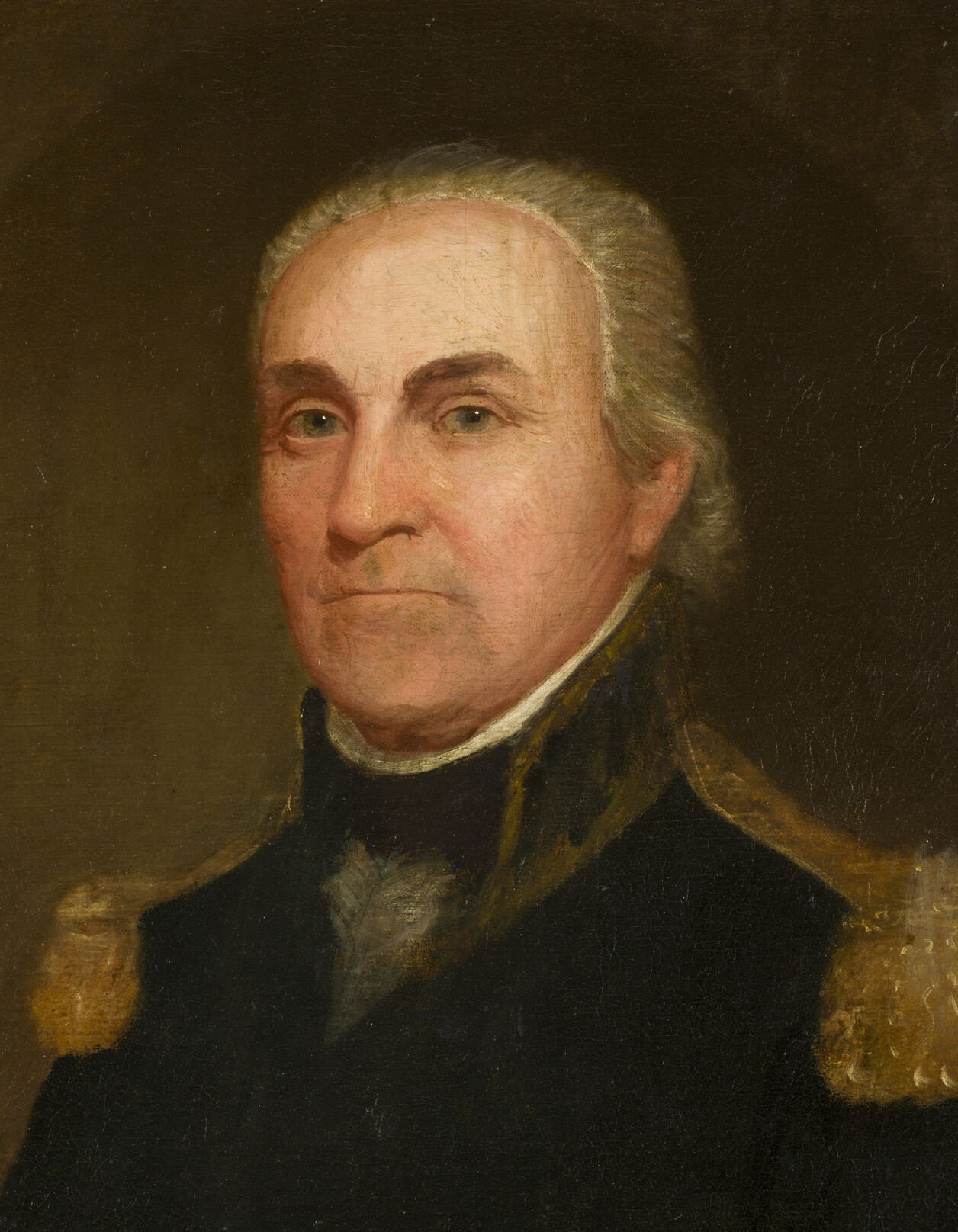
- Portrait of Ebenezer Mattoon, attributed to Ethan Allen Greenwood

Member of the U.S. House of Representatives from Massachusetts's 3rd district
- In office February 2, 1801 – March 3, 1803
- Preceded by: Samuel Lyman
- Succeeded by: Manasseh Cutler

Member of the Massachusetts House of Representatives
- In office 1812

Personal details
- Born: August 19, 1755 North Amherst, Province of Massachusetts Bay, British America
- Died: September 11, 1843 (aged 88) Amherst, Massachusetts, U.S.
- Party: Federalist
- Education: Dartmouth College

Military service
- Allegiance: United States of America
- Branch/service: Massachusetts militia
- Rank: Major general
- Battles/wars: American Revolutionary War

Ebenezer Mattoon (August 19, 1755 – September 11, 1843) was a United States representative from Massachusetts. He was born in North Amherst in the Province of Massachusetts Bay on August 19, 1755. He attended the common schools and received private instruction. He graduated from Dartmouth College in 1776. Mattoon served in the Revolutionary Army. He taught school and also engaged in agricultural pursuits.

He was a member of the Massachusetts House of Representatives, was a justice of the peace 1782–1796, and served in the Massachusetts State Senate. He served from the rank of captain to that of major general of the Fourth Division, State militia. He was appointed Sheriff of Hampshire County and served twenty years. Mattoon was elected as a Federalist to the Sixth Congress to fill the vacancy caused by the resignation of Samuel Lyman. He was reelected to the Seventh Congress and served from February 2, 1801 – March 3, 1803.

He again served as a state representative in 1812. He also served as adjutant general of the Massachusetts Militia with the rank of major general from 1816 to 1818. He was elected captain of the Ancient and Honorable Artillery Company of Massachusetts in 1817 and served a one-year term. He became totally blind in 1818 and retired from active public life.

He was a delegate to the Massachusetts Constitutional Convention of 1820–1821. Mattoon died in Amherst on September 11, 1843. His interment was in West Cemetery.

U.S. House of Representatives
Preceded by Samuel Lyman	Member of the U.S. House of Representatives from Massachusetts's 3rd congressional district February 2, 1801 – March 3, 1803	Succeeded by Manasseh Cutler
