= James Bowdoin III =

American politician, philanthropist, and diplomat (1752–1811)

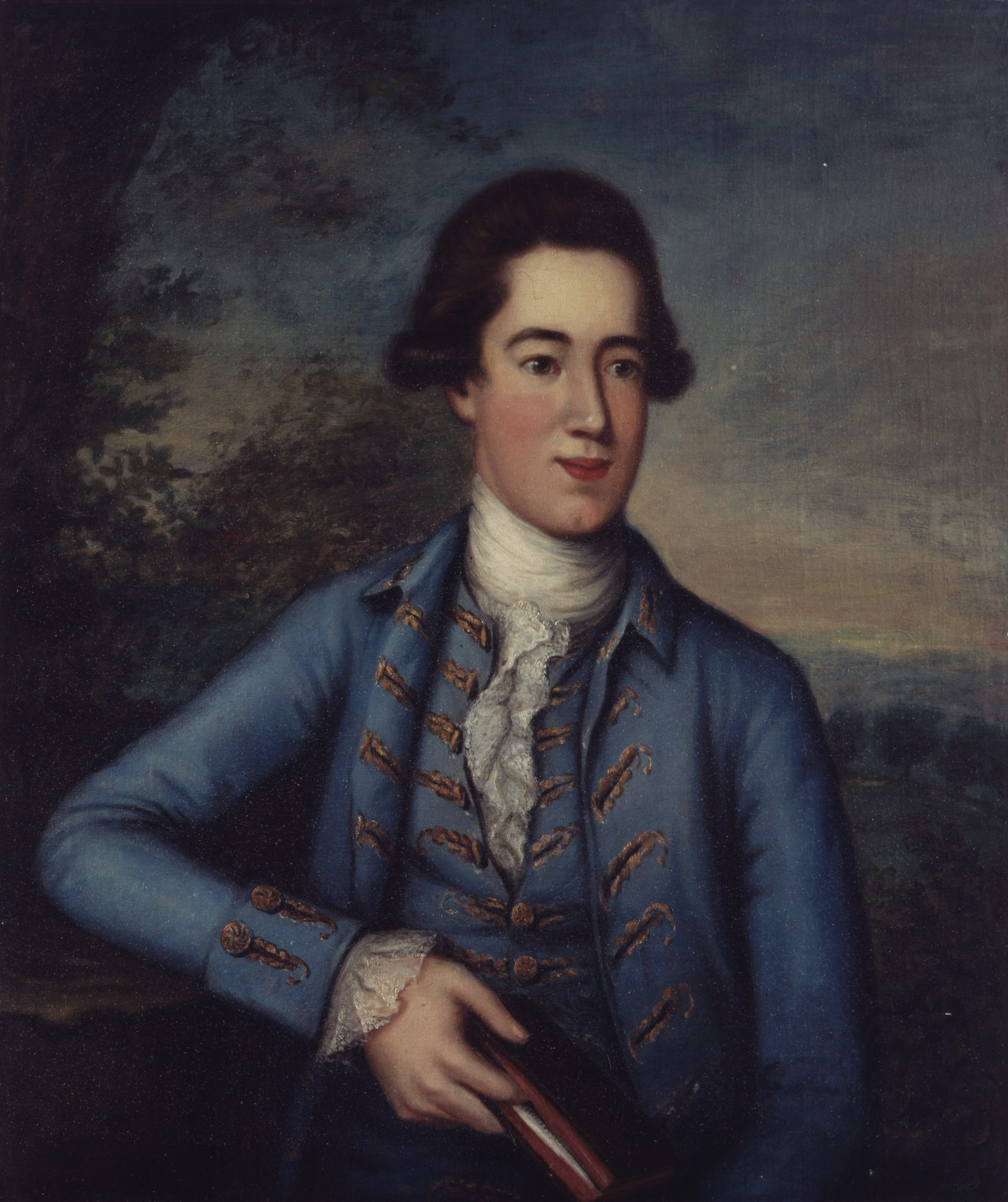
- Portrait, c. 1771–1775
- Born: James Bowdoin III; September 22, 1752; Boston, Massachusetts
- Died: October 11, 1811 (aged 59); Gosnold, Massachusetts
- Education: Harvard College; University of Oxford
- Known for: Co-founding Bowdoin College
- Spouse: Sarah Dearborn

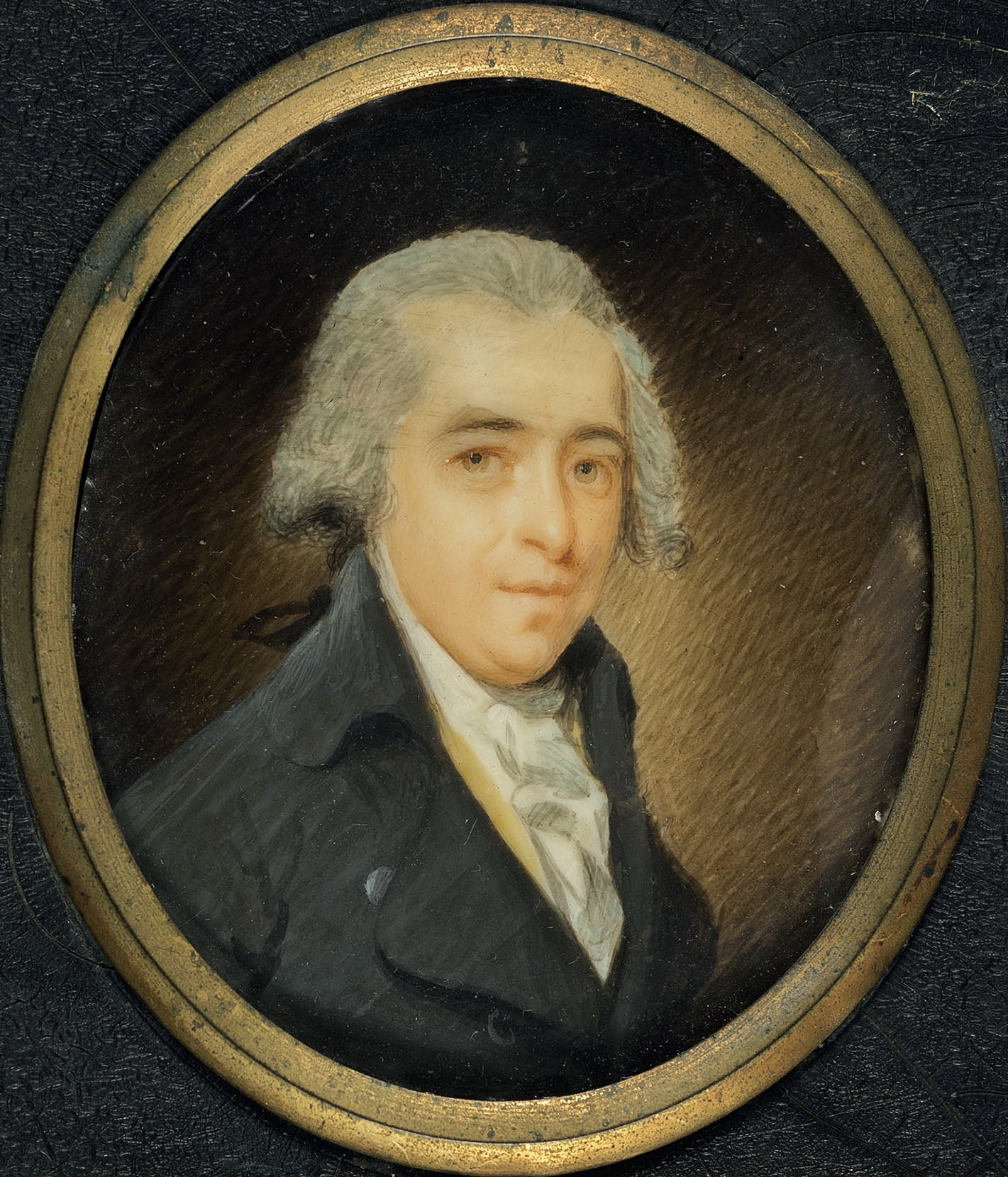
Portrait miniature of Bowdoin by Edward Greene Malbone, c. 1804

James Bowdoin III (September 22, 1752 – October 11, 1811) was an American politician, philanthropist and diplomat. Born in Boston to James Bowdoin and his wife Elizabeth, he graduated from Harvard College in 1771. Bowdoin proceeded to study law at the University of Oxford and traveled throughout Europe until 1775, when he received news of the outbreak of the American Revolutionary War and returned home. A supporter of the Patriot cause, Bowdoin served in the General Court and Governor's Council of Massachusetts before attending the state's Constitutional Convention of 1779–1780. He was a candidate in five elections to the United States House of Representatives in 1792, 1793, and 1796 but was unsuccessful in all five.

Having been elected as a fellow of the American Academy of Arts and Sciences in 1786, Bowdoin devoted several years of his post-political career to scholarly pursuits. After Bowdoin College was founded in Maine on June 27, 1794, he gave the new school 6,000 acres (24 km^{2}) and $5,500. Bowdoin was appointed as the American ambassador to Spain in 1804 and arrived in Madrid in May 1805 but never actually assumed the post of ambassador. In March 1806 Bowdoin and John Armstrong Jr. were appointed as commissioners with orders to negotiate boundaries and other American diplomatic issues with Spain. Bowdoin returned to the United States in 1808 when talks held with the Spanish government in Paris ended without success.

Bowdoin died on October 11, 1811 at Naushon Island in Buzzards Bay, Massachusetts and bequethed his library, papers, mineral collection, scientific apparatuses, and art collection to Bowdoin College in his will.
