= William Shepard =

American politician

General William Shepard
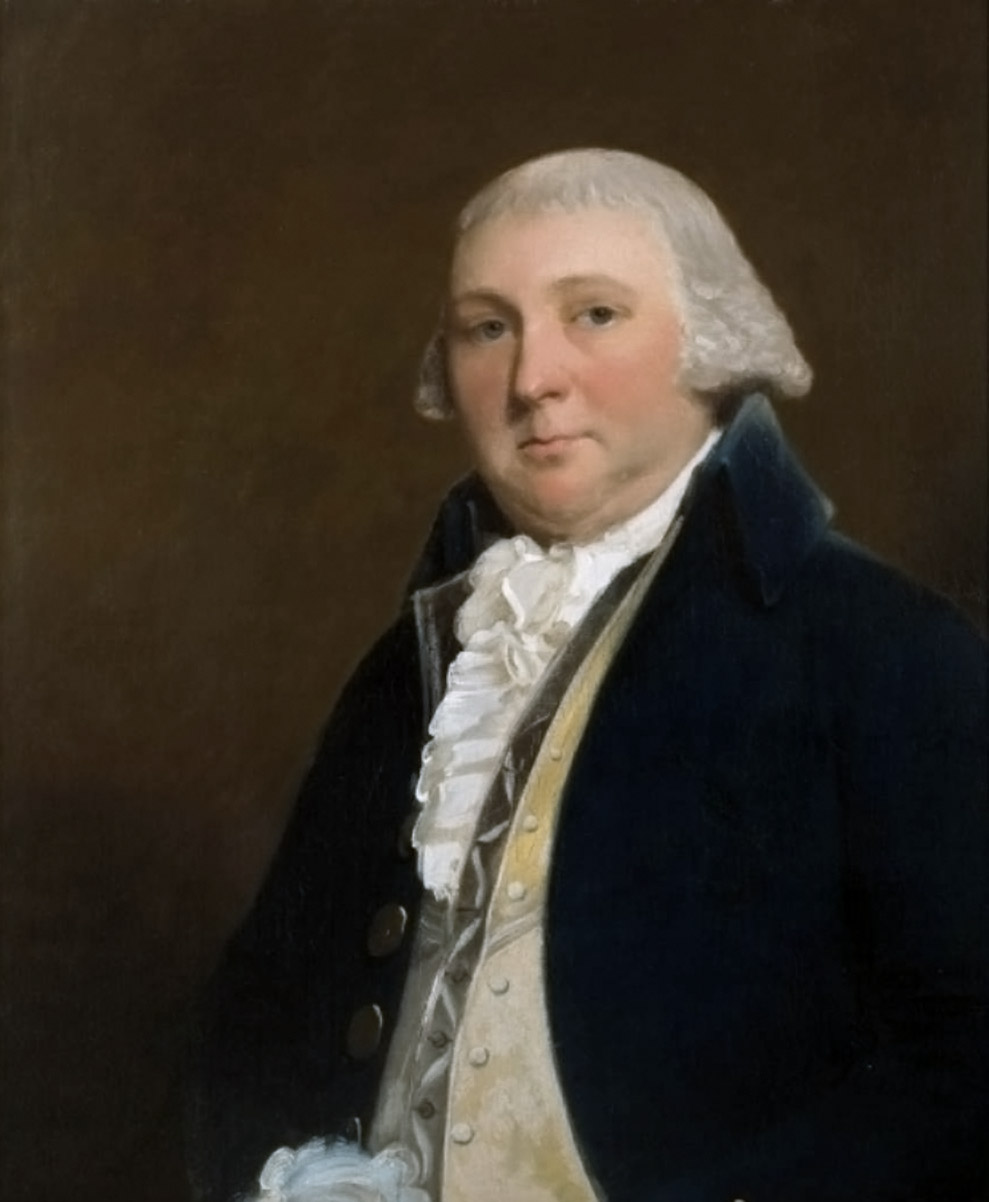

Member of the U.S. House of Representatives from Massachusetts's 2nd district
- In office March 4, 1797 – March 3, 1803
- Preceded by: William Lyman
- Succeeded by: Jacob Crowninshield

Massachusetts Governor's Council
- In office 1792–1796

Personal details
- Born: December 1, 1737 Westfield, Province of Massachusetts Bay, British America
- Died: November 16, 1817 (aged 79) Westfield, Massachusetts, U.S.
- Party: Federalist
- Spouse(s): Married January 31, 1760; Sarah Dewey

Military service
- Allegiance: Kingdom of Great Britain; United States
- Branch/service: British Army; Continental Army
- Years of service: 1754–1763; 1775–1777
- Rank: General
- Commands: 4th Massachusetts Regiment
- Battles/wars: French and Indian War; American Revolutionary War: Battle of New York; Battle of Monmouth; Battle of Princeton; Battle of Trenton; Battle of Yorktown; Shays' Rebellion

William Shepard (December 1, 1737 [O.S. November 20, 1737] (Note: Contemporary records, which used the Julian calendar and the Annunciation Style of enumerating years, recorded his birth as November 20, 1737. The provisions of the British Calendar (New Style) Act 1750, implemented in 1752, altered the official British dating method to the Gregorian calendar with the start of the year on January 1 (it had been March 25). These changes resulted in dates being moved forward 11 days, and for those between January 1 and March 25, an advance of one year. For a further explanation, see: Old Style and New Style dates.) – November 16, 1817) was a United States representative from Massachusetts (1797–1802), and a military officer in the Continental Army during the American Revolutionary War. As a state militia leader he protected the Springfield Armory during Shays' Rebellion, firing cannon into the force of Daniel Shays and compelling them to disperse. He also served in town and state government and was a member of the Massachusetts Governor's Council.

== Life ==
Born in Westfield in the Province of Massachusetts Bay, he attended the common schools, engaged in agricultural pursuits, and served in the French and Indian Wars for six years. He was a member of the committee of correspondence for Westfield in 1774, and was a lieutenant colonel of Minutemen in April 1775 and served under Colonel Timothy Danielson. He entered the Continental Army in May 1775 as lieutenant colonel and was commissioned Colonel of the 4th Massachusetts Regiment on October 6, 1776, serving throughout the Revolutionary War, including winter at Valley Forge, Pennsylvania, where he commanded the 4th Regiment of Massachusetts Continentals, under the overall command of General John Glover. His name is immortalized along with his comrades on stone monuments there. Many letters still exist between Shepard and other commanders, including General George Washington, the Marquis de Lafayette, John Hancock, Samuel Adams, Thomas Jefferson, General Henry Knox and other illustrious founding fathers.

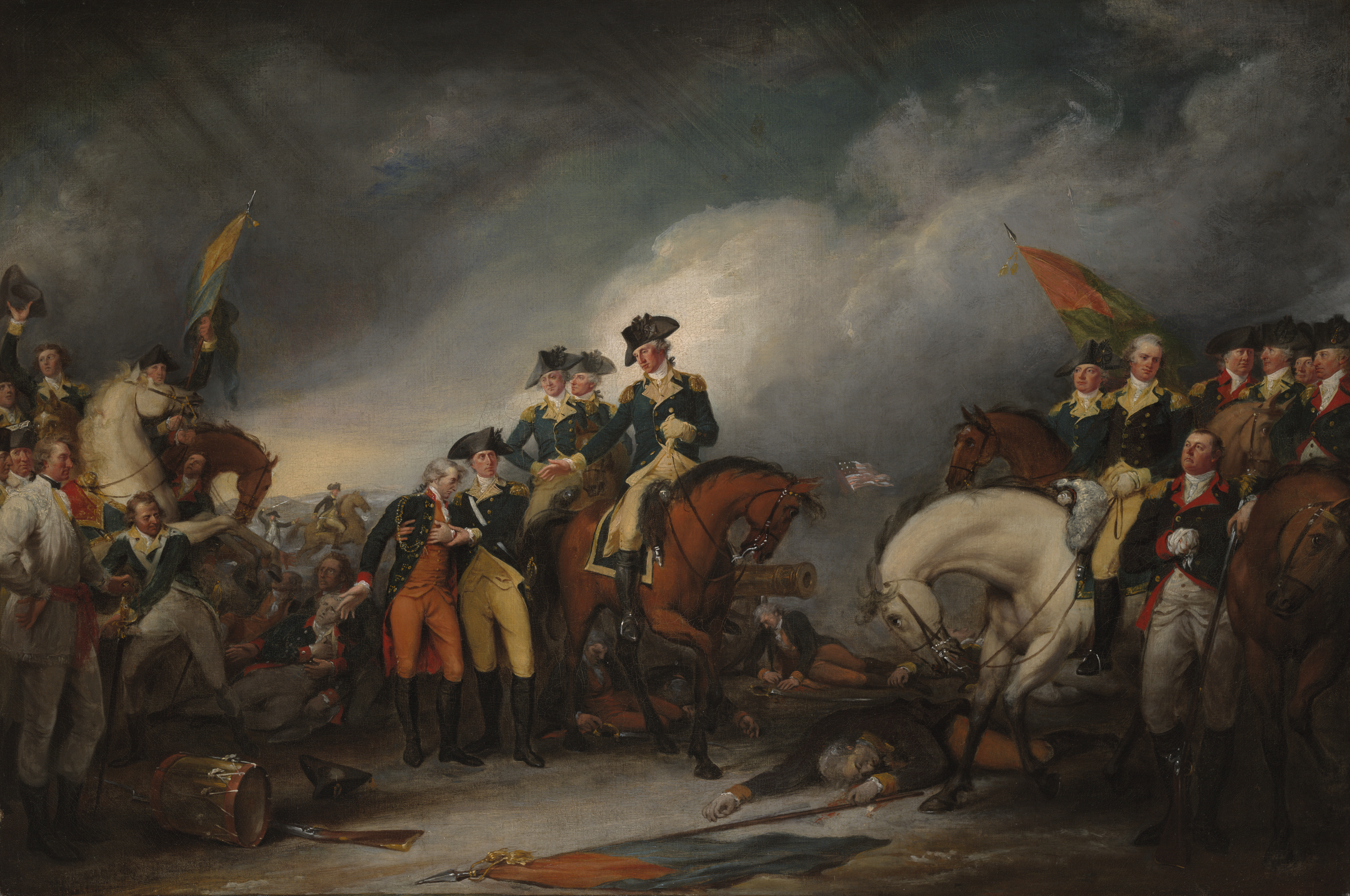
Col. William Shepard was at the Battle of Trenton, N.J. with George Washington, and his likeness appears in the painting The Capture of the Hessians at Trenton, December 26, 1776, by John Trumbull.

Shepard was a member of the Massachusetts House of Representatives in 1785 and 1786 and was selectman for Westfield from 1784 to 1787. In this time local farmers and veterans of the war began to rebel after months of destitution and taxation they believed to be unfairly levied by the powers from Boston. Many were consigned to debtors' prison. Shepard, then a major general in the state militia, called to duty the Fourth Division of the Massachusetts militia in 1786 and defended the Springfield Armory during what became known as Shays' Rebellion (after one of its principal leaders, Daniel Shays), ordering defenders of the arsenal to fire cannons at attacking the rebels at "waist height" with cannons filled with anti-personnel grape shot. Two of the insurgents were mortally wounded. Messages to Governor James Bowdoin expressed his deep regret at the shedding of blood. He kept in constant contact with Governor Bowdoin, Sam Adams, John Hancock, and General Benjamin Lincoln, who arrived in a blizzard from Boston just after the Springfield arsenal attack to pursue Shays and his men into the surrounding towns. That order would earn Shepard a lasting reputation as the "murderer of brethren." The local neighbors were so angry that they mutilated his horses, gouging out their eyes, to his horror. He was a member of the Governor's council of Massachusetts from 1792 to 1796, and was appointed in 1796 to treat with the Penobscot Indians and, in 1797, with the Six Nations.

Shepard was elected as a Federalist to the Fifth, Sixth, and Seventh Congresses, serving from March 4, 1797, to March 3, 1803, representing the 2nd congressional district; he previously unsuccessfully ran for this district in 1792 (for its Hampshire County seat) and 1794.

After retiring, he resumed his agricultural pursuits and died in Westfield, essentially penniless.

== In popular culture ==
A statue of him stands in Westfield, sculpted by Augustus Lukeman.

Each year on Patriots' Day, a ceremony is held in Westfield, wherein his descendants and those of four other founding families of Westfield join city and state government representatives, members of the armed forces, clergy, local school children and residents in giving prayer and remembrance of the town's history.

From a mid-western paper c.1928 he was reported to have been quoted as saying, "Hang On! If the motherhood of America ever lets go, it will serve us right if America turns to the saloon or its equivalent. But the motherhood of America will not let go."

== Bibliography ==
- United States Congress. "William Shepard (id: S000330)". Biographical Directory of the United States Congress.
- "A Little Rebellion" by Marion L. Starkey c.1995, Pub.by Alfred A.Knopf, L.o.C. cat # 55-9292
- Lockwood, John Hoyt (1922). Westfield and its historic influences, 1669-1919: the life of an Early Town., Volume 1. Springfield, MA: Rev. John Hoyt Lockwood, D.D.
- Massachusetts, Office of the Secretary of State. (1906) Massachusetts soldiers and sailors of the revolutionary war. A compilation from the archives prepared and published by the secretary of the commonwealth in accordance with chapter 100, resolves of 1891. Boston: Wright and Potter Printing Co., State Printers.
- Westfield (Mass.) 250th Anniversary. Committee of One Hundred (1919). The History of the Celebration of the Two Hundred and Fiftieth Anniversary of the Incorporation of the Town of Westfield Massachusetts. Concord, NH: Rumford Press.

U.S. House of Representatives
Preceded by William Lyman	Member of the U.S. House of Representatives from Massachusetts's 2nd congressional district March 4, 1797 – March 3, 1803	Succeeded by Jacob Crowninshield
