= Dwight Foster (politician, born 1757) =

American politician (1757–1823)

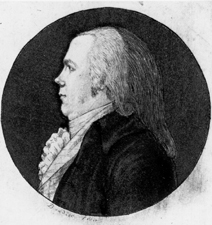

United States Senator from
- In office June 6, 1800 – March 3, 1803
- Preceded by: Samuel Dexter
- Succeeded by: Timothy Pickering

Member of the U.S. House of Representatives from Massachusetts
- In office March 4, 1793 – June 6, 1800 Serving with Theodore Sedgwick, Artemas Ward, and William Lyman (2nd District-GT)
- Preceded by: Benjamin Goodhue
- Succeeded by: Levi Lincoln Sr.
- Constituency: 2nd district (1793–95); 4th district (1795–1800)

9th Sheriff of Worcester County, Massachusetts
- In office 1792–1793
- Preceded by: John Sprague
- Succeeded by: William Caldwell

Member of the Massachusetts House of Representatives
- In office 1791–1792
- In office 1808–1809

Personal details
- Born: December 7, 1757 Brookfield, Province of Massachusetts Bay, British America
- Died: April 29, 1823 (aged 65) Brookfield, Massachusetts, U.S.
- Party: Federalist
- Spouse: Rebecca Faulkner
- Relations: Theodore Foster; Dwight Foster MA
- Children: Alfred Dwight Foster
- Education: Brown University; Harvard University
- Profession: Lawyer

Dwight Foster (December 7, 1757 – April 29, 1823) was an American lawyer and politician from Massachusetts. He served in the Massachusetts House of Representatives, the United States House of Representatives and the United States Senate.

== Early life ==
Foster was born in Brookfield in the Province of Massachusetts Bay, and attended the common schools in Brookfield. He graduated from the College in the English Colony of Rhode Island and Providence Plantations (the former name of Brown University) at Providence in 1774. He then studied law and was admitted to the bar association in 1778. He remained in Rhode Island to practice law, beginning his law practice in Providence. He received his master's degree from Harvard University in 1784.

== Career ==
After returning to Massachusetts, Foster held various positions in the government. He served as justice of the peace for Worcester County from 1781 to 1823, as special justice of the court of common pleas in 1792, and as sheriff of Worcester County in 1792. In 1791, he was elected as a Federalist candidate to the Massachusetts House of Representatives.

He was elected as a United States House of Representatives to the 3rd United States Congress in 1793, and was re-elected to the three succeeding Congresses, defeating Levi Lincoln, Sr. each time. He served in Congress from March 4, 1793, until his resignation on June 6, 1800. While in Congress, he was Chairman of the United States Senate Committee on Claims.

In 1799, he was a delegate to the State constitutional convention and on June 6, 1800, he was elected to the United States Senate to fill the vacancy caused by Samuel Dexter's resignation. He served in the Senate until his resignation on March 3, 1803. He was a member of the State House from 1808 to 1809 and a member of the Massachusetts Governor's Council in 1818.

In 1813 he was elected a member of the American Antiquarian Society.

Foster died in Brookfield on April 29, 1823, aged 65.

== Family life ==
Foster's father was Massachusetts Supreme Judicial Court Justice Jedediah Foster, who graduated from Harvard University in 1744. Foster married Rebecca Faulkner on May 7, 1783, and they had one son, Alfred Dwight Foster.

He was the brother of U.S. Senator Theodore Foster, and was the grandfather and namesake of Massachusetts Attorney General and Massachusetts Supreme Judicial Court Justice Dwight Foster MA.

U.S. House of Representatives
Preceded by Benjamin Goodhue	Member of the U.S. House of Representatives from Massachusetts's 2nd congressional district 1793–1795 alongside:William Lyman, Theodore Sedgwick, Artemas Ward on a general ticket	Succeeded by William Lyman
Preceded by Henry Dearborn, George Thatcher, Peleg Wadsworth, General Ticket (Maine District)	Member of the U.S. House of Representatives from Massachusetts's 4th congressional district 1795–1799	Succeeded by Levi Lincoln Sr.
U.S. Senate
Preceded by Samuel Dexter	U.S. senator (Class 2) from Massachusetts; 1800–1803; Served alongside: Jonathan Mason	Succeeded by Timothy Pickering
