= Artemas Ward =

Continental Army general (1727–1800)

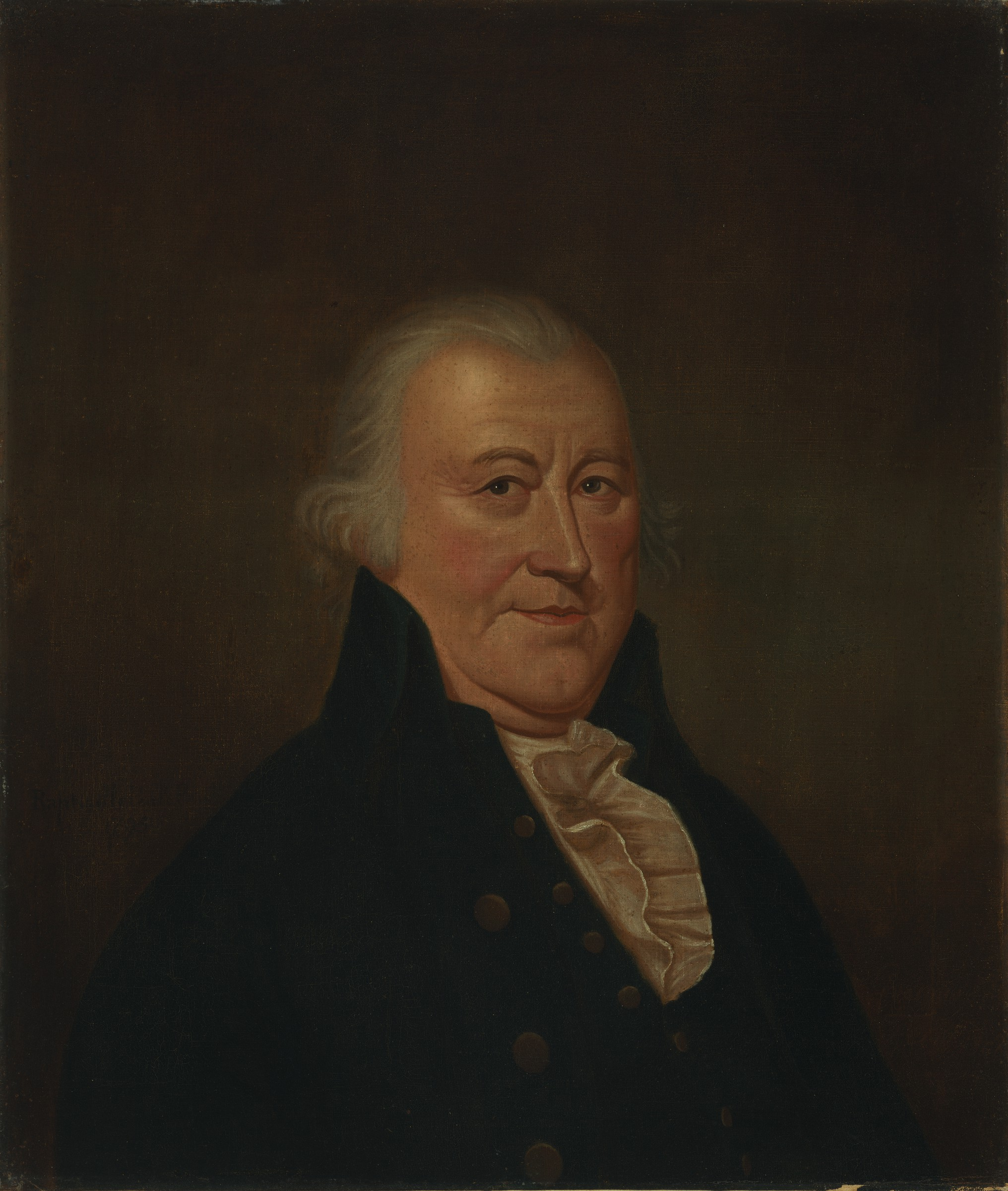
- Portrait by Raphaelle Peale, c. 1795

Member of the U.S. House of Representatives from Massachusetts
- In office March 4, 1791 – March 3, 1795 Serving with Dwight Foster, Theodore Sedgwick, and William Lyman (2nd District-GT)
- Preceded by: George Leonard
- Succeeded by: William Lyman
- Constituency: 7th district (1791–93); 2nd district (1793–95)

Personal details
- Born: November 26, 1727 Shrewsbury, Massachusetts, British America
- Died: October 28, 1800 (aged 72) Shrewsbury, Massachusetts, U.S.
- Resting place: Mountain View Cemetery, Shrewsbury
- Party: Pro-Administration
- Spouse: Sarah (Trowbridge) Ward
- Children: Ithamar (1752), Nahum (1754), Sara (1756), Thomas (1758), Martha (1760), Artemas Jr. (1762), Maria (1764), Henry Dana (1768)
- Education: Harvard University
- Occupation: Soldier, politician
- Known for: Revolutionary War Major General
- Website: Artemas Ward Museum

Military service
- Allegiance: Great Britain; United States
- Branch/service: British Army; Continental Army
- Years of service: 1755–1758; 1775–1777
- Rank: Colonel; Commander-in-chief of the Massachusetts Bay colony's militia Major general of the Continental Army
- Commands: British Army's 3rd Regiment of the Massachusetts Bay militia—the militia of Middlesex and Worcester Counties; Second-in-command of the Massachusetts Provincial Militia; Continental Army in command of the Eastern Department April 4, 1776 – March 20, 1777
- Battles/wars: French and Indian War; American Revolutionary War; Boston campaign

Artemas Ward (November 26, 1727 – October 28, 1800) was an American major general in the American Revolutionary War and a Congressman from Massachusetts. He was considered an effective political leader, President John Adams describing him as "universally esteemed, beloved, and confided in by his army and his country".

== Early life ==
Artemas Ward was born at Shrewsbury in the Province of Massachusetts Bay in 1727 to Nahum Ward (1684–1754) and Martha (Howe) Ward. He was the sixth of seven children. His father had broad and successful career interests as a sea captain, merchant, land developer, farmer, lawyer and jurist. As a child he attended the common schools and shared a tutor with his brothers and sisters. He graduated from Harvard in 1748 and taught there briefly.

On July 31, 1750, he married Sarah Trowbridge (December 3, 1724 – December 13, 1788), the daughter of Reverend Caleb Trowbridge and Hannah Trowbridge of Groton. The young couple returned to Shrewsbury where Artemas opened a general store. In the next fifteen years they would have eight children: Ithamar in 1752, Nahum (1754), Sara (1756), Thomas (1758), Martha (1760), Artemas Jr. (1762), Maria (1764), and Henry Dana (1768).

== Career ==
=== Township assessor ===
In 1751, at age 23 or 24, he was named a township assessor for Worcester County, the first of many public offices he was to fill. In 1752 he was elected a justice of the peace and to the first of many terms in the Massachusetts provincial assembly, or "general court."

=== Military career ===
==== French and Indian War (1754–1758) ====
Between 1755 and 1757, Ward was called to active duty at intervals that alternated with his attendance at the General Court. In 1755 the Massachusetts militia was restructured for the war; Ward was made a major in the 3rd Regiment which drew its company mainly from Worcester County. The 3rd primarily served as a garrison force along the frontier in western Massachusetts. In 1757 he was promoted to regimental colonel of the 3rd Regiment of the militias of Middlesex and Worcester counties. In 1758 the regiment marched with Abercrombie's force to sortie on Fort Ticonderoga, but Ward was sidelined during the campaign by an "attack of the stone."

==== Between wars ====
By 1762, Ward returned to Shrewsbury permanently and was named to the Court of Common Pleas. In the General Court (the provincial assembly) he, with Samuel Adams and John Hancock, was appointed to the taxation committee. On the floor, he was second only to James Otis in speaking out against the acts of parliament in London. His prominence in these debates prompted the Royal Governor Francis Bernard to revoke his military commission in 1767. At the next election in 1768, Bernard voided the election results for Worcester and banned Ward from the assembly, but this didn't silence him.

In the growing sentiment favoring rebellion, the 3rd Regiment resigned en masse from Crown service on October 3, 1774. They then marched on Shrewsbury to inform Ward that they had unanimously elected him their leader. Later that month the governor abolished the assembly. The towns of Massachusetts responded by setting up a colony-wide Committee of Safety. One of the first actions of the committee was to name Ward as general and commander-in-chief of the colony's militia.

==== American Revolutionary War ====
Following the Battle of Lexington and Concord on April 19, 1775, the rebel (colonial) forces followed the British troops back to Boston and deployed to start the Siege of Boston, cutting all land access to the city. At first Ward directed his forces from his sickbed (in Shrewsbury), later moving his headquarters to Cambridge. Soon, both the New Hampshire and Connecticut provisional governments named him commander of their forces participating in the siege. Most of his efforts during this time were devoted to organization and supply problems.

Additional British forces arrived by sea in May, and in June, Ward learned of their plan to attack Bunker Hill. He gave orders to fortify the point, setting the stage for the Battle of Bunker Hill on June 17, 1775. Command during the battle devolved upon General Israel Putnam and Colonel William Prescott.

Meanwhile, the Continental Congress was creating the Continental Army. On June 17, Congress commissioned Ward a major general, and appointed him second in command to General George Washington. (Ward was one of the original four major generals in the Continental Army along with Charles Lee, Philip Schuyler and Israel Putnam.) Over the next nine months he helped convert the assembled militia units into the Continental Army.

After the British evacuation of Boston on March 17, 1776, Washington led the main body of the army to New York City. Ward took command of the Eastern Department and held that post until March 1777, when ill health forced his resignation from the army.

== Post-war and death ==
Even during his military service, Ward also served as a state court justice in 1776 and 1777. From 1777 to 1779, as President of the state's Executive Council, he effectively served as governor before the ratification of the Massachusetts Constitution in 1780. He was continuously elected to the Massachusetts House of Representatives from 1779 through 1785, leading it as Speaker in 1785.

Ward was appointed a delegate to the Continental Congress in 1780 and 1781, and from 1791 to 1795 was elected twice to the United States House of Representatives after being an unsuccessful candidate in 1788. He was one of nine representatives to vote against final passage of the Eleventh Amendment to the United States Constitution.

Ward died at his home in Shrewsbury on October 28, 1800, and was buried with Sarah in the town's Mountain View Cemetery. (His great-grandson Artemas Ward wrote The Grocer's Encyclopedia, published in 1911.)

== Legacy ==
=== Ward, Massachusetts ===
Ward, Massachusetts was incorporated in 1778 in honor of Artemas Ward. In 1837, the town was renamed to Auburn, Massachusetts after complaints from the U.S. postal service that the name Ward was too similar to the nearby town of Ware.

=== Artemas Ward House ===
Ward's lifelong home had been built by his father, Nahum, about the time Artemas was born. The home is now known as the Artemas Ward House and is a museum preserved by Harvard University. Located at 786 Main Street in Shrewsbury, Massachusetts it is open to the public for limited hours during the summer months.

=== Ward Circle ===
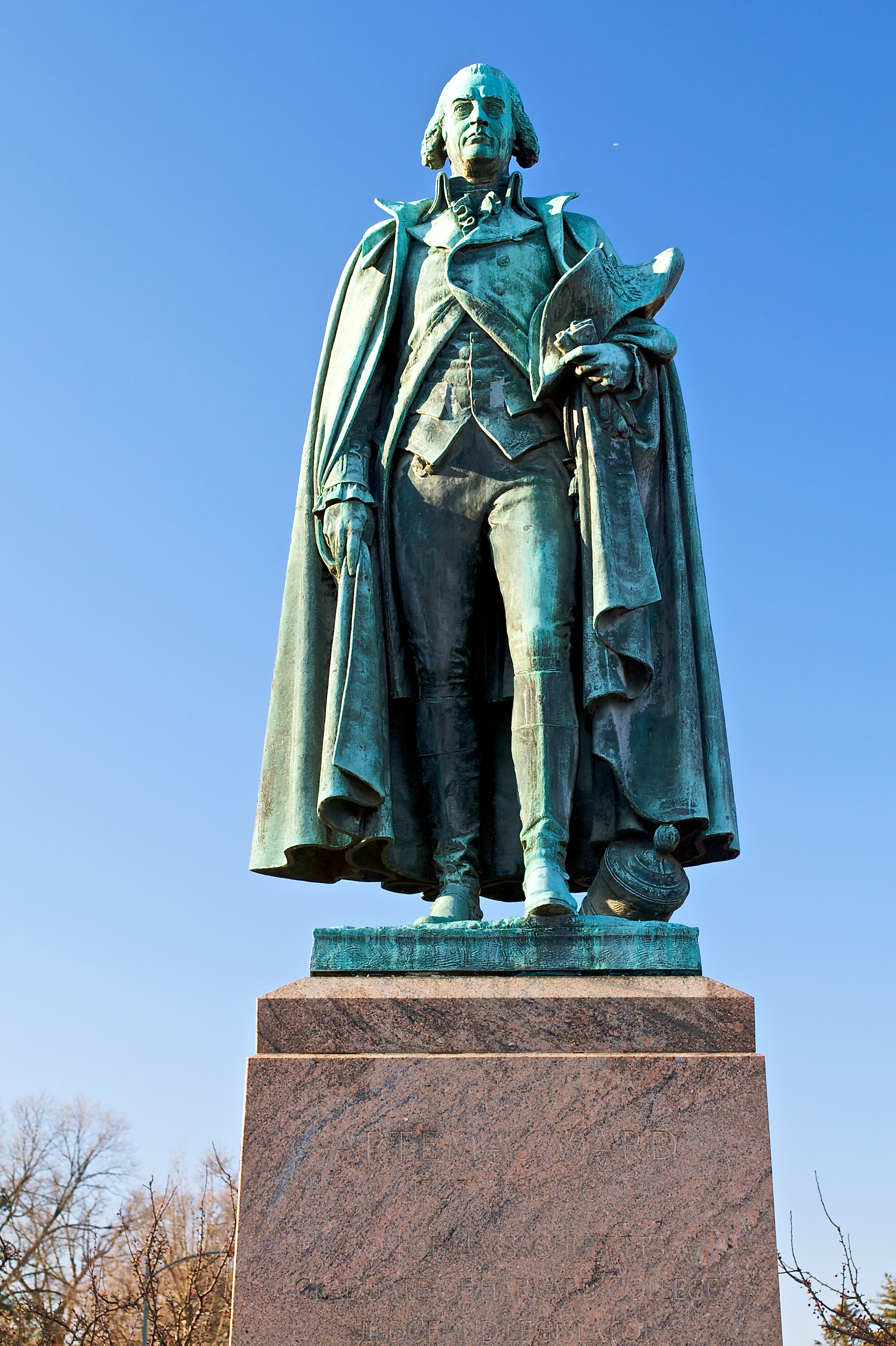
Statue of Artemas Ward at Ward Circle, Washington, D.C.

Ward Circle is a traffic circle at the intersection of Nebraska and Massachusetts Avenues in Northwest Washington, D.C. The land on three sides of Ward Circle is owned by American University. The circle contains a statue of Ward.

The great-grandson of Ward gave over four million dollars to Harvard University on the condition that they erect a statue in honor of Ward, and maintain his home in Shrewsbury. Harvard's initial offer in 1927 of $50,000 toward the statue was enough for a statue, but inadequate to provide the general with a horse.

The statue was unveiled on November 3, 1938 by Maj. Gen. Ward's great-great-great-granddaughter, Mrs. Lewis Wesley Feick. Although there are no crosswalks for pedestrian access to the circle, the base of the statue bears this inscription:

ARTEMAS WARD
1727–1800
SON OF MASSACHUSETTS
GRADUATE OF HARVARD COLLEGE
JUDGE AND LEGISLATOR
DELEGATE 1780–1781 TO THE CONTINENTAL CONGRESS
SOLDIER OF THREE WARS
FIRST COMMANDER OF THE PATRIOT FORCES

=== American University ===
American University named the Ward Circle Building, home of the American University School of Public Affairs, in honor of Artemas Ward.

== Notes ==
- Martyn, Charles (1921). The life of Artemas Ward, the first commander-in-chief of the American Revolution ... Port Washington, New York: Kennikat Press. ISBN 0804612765. OCLC 774031.
- Ward, Andrew H. (July 1851). "Memoir of Major General Artemas Ward". New England Historical and Genealogical Register. 5.

U.S. House of Representatives
Preceded by George Leonard	Member of the U.S. House of Representatives from Massachusetts's 7th congressional district 1791–1793	Succeeded by District eliminated
Preceded by Benjamin Goodhue	Member of the U.S. House of Representatives from Massachusetts's 2nd congressional district 1793–1795 alongside: Dwight Foster, Theodore Sedgwick, William Lyman on a General ticket (1793–1795)	Succeeded by William Lyman
Political offices
Preceded by Nathaniel Gorham	Speaker of the Massachusetts House of Representatives; 1786–1787	Succeeded by James Warren
Preceded by	Member of the Massachusetts House of Representatives; 1779–1785	Succeeded by
Military offices
Preceded by	Major of the 3rd Regiment; The Militia of Middlesex and Worcester Counties; 1755 – 1757	Succeeded by
