= William Lyman (politician) =

American politician (1755–1811)

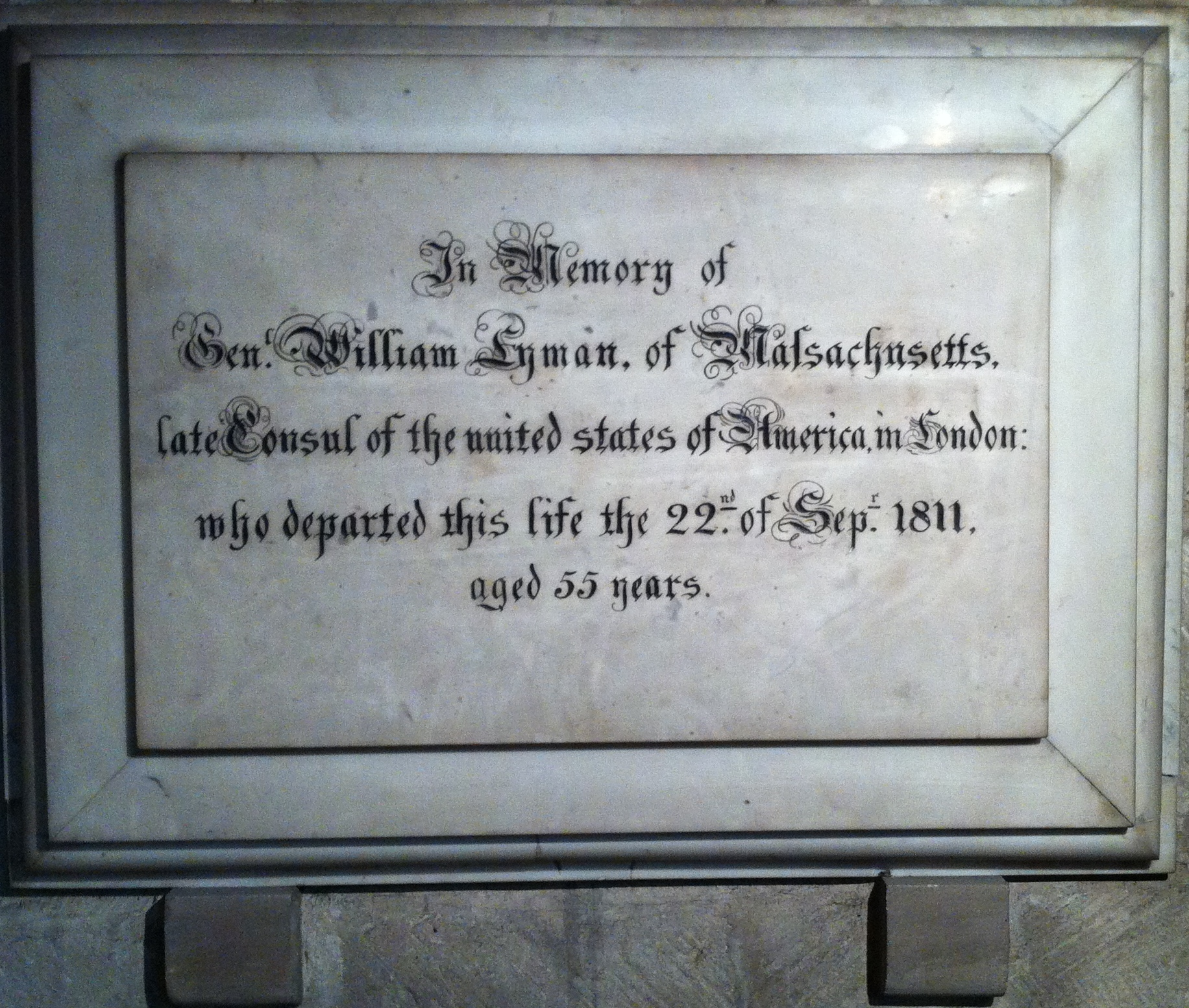

Member of the U.S. House of Representatives from Massachusetts's 2nd district
- In office March 4, 1793 – March 3, 1797 Serving with Dwight Foster, Theodore Sedgwick, and Artemas Ward from 1793 to 1795 (General ticket)
- Preceded by: Benjamin Goodhue
- Succeeded by: William Shepard

Member of the Massachusetts House of Representatives
- In office 1789

Personal details
- Born: December 7, 1755 Northampton, Province of Massachusetts Bay, British America
- Died: September 22, 1811 (aged 55) Cheltenham, Gloucestershire, England
- Resting place: Gloucester Cathedral
- Party: Anti-Administration
- Spouse(s): Jerusha Welles, d. June 11, 1803
- Education: Yale College

William Lyman (December 7, 1755 – September 22, 1811) was an American politician from Northampton, Massachusetts who served in the United States House of Representatives.

Lyman was born in Northampton in the Province of Massachusetts Bay to Captain William and Jemima (Sheldon) Lyman. He graduated from Yale College in 1776. He was a militia veteran of the American Revolution. During Shays' Rebellion he was an aide to General William Shepard with the rank of major.

In about 1781, Lyman married Jerusha Welles, of East Hartford, Connecticut; they had eight children. Jerusha died at age 43, on June 11, 1803. Lyman served in the Massachusetts House of Representatives in 1787 and in the Massachusetts State Senate in 1789.

Lyman was a candidate for the first congress and ran in the Hampshire Berkshire District as an Anti-Federalist against the Federalist candidate Theodore Sedgwick. Sedgwick was elected. Seventeen towns that were favorable to Lyman were late in sending in their returns; had these towns reported in a timely manner, Lyman would have been elected.

Lyman represented Massachusetts in the United States House of Representatives from March 4, 1793 to March 3, 1797.

In 1804 Lyman was appointed U.S. consul in London. He died while on duty in 1811 at Cheltenham, Gloucestershire, England, and is interred in the Cathedral at Gloucester, England.

== Notes ==
U.S. House of Representatives
Preceded by Benjamin Goodhue	Member of the U.S. House of Representatives from Massachusetts's 2nd congressional district March 4, 1793 - March 3, 1797 alongside: Dwight Foster, Theodore Sedgwick, Artemas Ward on a General ticket (1793-1795)	Succeeded by William Shepard
Diplomatic posts
Preceded by	United States Consul to London; January 11, 1805 – September 22, 1811	Succeeded by
