= Richard Woodward (tavern owner) =

Richard "Dick" Woodward was an American tavern keeper. He was a patriot and soldier in the American Revolution, played host to the convention that adopted the Suffolk Resolves, and a leader of Dedham, Massachusetts.

== Personal life ==
Woodward was a member of a prominent family from Dedham, Massachusetts. He married his first wife, Susannah (née Luce), on April 2, 1747, by Rev. Samuel Dexter. (Note: Susannah died on September 24, 1763.) The couple had several sons, including Richard Jr., a teacher in Dedham and soldier in the Revolutionary War.

On February 23, 1772, Woodward married Deborah Ames. When they sued a relative over an estate, their lawyer was John Adams. It was an unhappy marriage, however, and the couple divorced. Before the American Revolution was over, Woodward moved to New Haven.

Woodward was also disliked by Deborah's children. Fisher Ames accused him of only marrying his mother for her money and of stealing nearly $1,000. Fisher's brother, Nathaniel, once got into an altercation whereby Woodward struck him with a saw. Nathaniel had Woodward arrested and bound to good behavior. Nathaniel also accused Woodward of theft.

Deborah ran the Ames Tavern for several years with the help of several of her sons after the death of her first husband. In 1772, she married Woodward and it became known as the Woodward Tavern.

His name is listed among those who led the town of Dedham in its second century.

== American Revolution ==
In 1768, Woodward was one of Dedham's delegates to the Massachusetts Convention of Towns, an extralegal assembly held in Boston in response to the news that British troops would soon be arriving to crack down on anti-British rioting. (Note: Nathaniel Sumner was the other.)

When Town Meeting voted in 1770 to prohibit the drinking of foreign tea in protest of the Townshend Acts, Woodward was elected to a committee to enforce the ban.

A general convention of delegates from every town in Suffolk County was called for August 16, 1774, at Doty's Tavern in Stoughton (today Canton). The group agreed on the need to take a united stand against the Intolerable Acts but, since not every community was represented, it was decided to adjourn and try again with full representation. Woodward, a member of the Committee of Correspondence, offered to host the next gathering on September 6, 1774.

Before Woodward and Deborah divorced, the convention that adopted the Suffolk Resolves met in the tavern and began their work. Woodward himself was elected a delegate to the convention from Dedham.

Woodward was also elected by the convention, along with Joseph Warren and 13 others, to meet the governor and inform him that the residents of Suffolk County were alarmed by the fortifications the British Army was making at Boston Neck. They asked him to intervene and protest the fortifications, as well as the abuses soldiers committed against civilians in the county.

When word of the battles at battles at Lexington and Concord reached Dedham, Woodward was among those who responded. His was the second company to leave, probably from Dedham Island, and he served as lieutenant under Captain George Gould.

== Works cited ==
- Bernhard, Winfred E. A. (1965). Fisher Ames, Federalist and Statesman, 1758-1808. Williamsburg, VA: Institute of Early American History and Culture.
- Town of Dedham, ed. (1886). Record of Baptisms, Marriages and Deaths, and Admissions to the Church and Dismissals Therefrom, Transcribed from the Church Records of the Town of Dedham, Massachusetts, 1638-1845. Dedham Transcript Press.
- Fisher, Phillip A. (1898). The Fisher Genealogy: A Record of the Descendants of Joshua, Anthony, and Cornelius Fisher, of Dedham, Mass., 1630-1640. Massachusetts Publishing Company. ISBN 978-0-608-32125-7.
- Hanson, Robert Brand (1976). Dedham, Massachusetts, 1635-1890. Dedham Historical Society.
- Hurd, Duane Hamilton (1884). History of Norfolk County, Massachusetts: With Biographical Sketches of Many of Its Pioneers and Prominent Men. J.W. Lewis & Company.
- Mann, Herman (1847). Historical Annals of Dedham: From Its Settlement in 1635 to 1847. H. Mann.
- Rudd, Edward Huntting (1908). Dedham's Ancient Landmarks and Their National Significance. Dedham Transcript Printing and Publishing Company.
- Smith, Frank (1936). A History of Dedham, Massachusetts. Transcript Press, Incorporated.
