= Ames Almanack =

First almanac printed in the British North American colonies

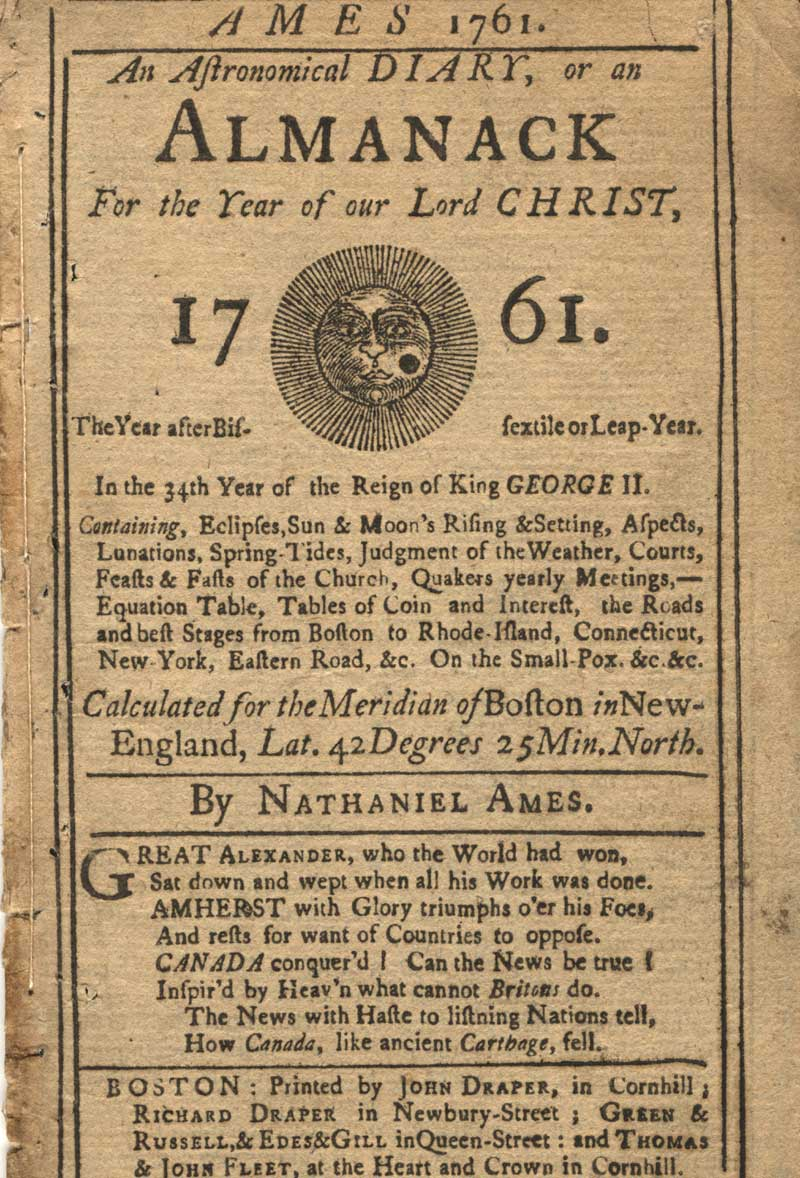
- Cover of Ames Almanack in 1761
- Author: Nathaniel Ames (1725-1764); Nathaniel Ames (1764-1775)
- Country: United States
- Language: English
- Genre: Almanac
- Published: 1725-1775

Ames' Almanack (almanac) was the first almanac printed in the British North American colonies. While Benjamin Franklin's Poor Richard's Almanack is more widely known, the Ames' Almanack had a much larger readership. Franklin's publication had a circulation of 10,000 copies compared to 60,000 for the Ames' Almanack.

== History ==
Nathaniel Ames, a second generation colonial American, was the founder and publisher of the Ames' Almanac. The first edition was published when Ames was seventeen. His family owned Ames Tavern, which was often advertised in the almanac. Upon Ames' death in 1764, his son, also Nathaniel, took over and continued to publish the almanac until 1775.

The younger Nathaniel strongly supported the Anti-Federalist cause, unlike his brother, Fisher Ames, who was a Federalist congressman. Correspondence between Ames and Roger Sherman in 1753 attests that Sherman wrote some of the mathematical portions of the almanac.

== Intellectual property ==
With no real intellectual property enforcement, readers frequently copied from the almanac. This led to bickering among printers as to who published the genuine edition of Ames' Almanack. Ames was asked to certify the original version.

== Legacy ==
Ames wrote during a time of growing American nationalism and this was reflected in the annual almanacs. In 1775, when the American Revolution began, the almanac published a manual on how to make gunpowder so that every man could supply himself "with a sufficiency of that commodity." As George Washington wrote to Congress, the Continental Army was "exceedingly destitute" of gunpowder.

Ames took a stand on the religious Great Awakening running through the colonies in the early 18th century. The Great Awakening challenged the traditional authority of the congregationalist church. George Whitefield, an English evangelist, stirred up controversy in the colonies with his sermons. In 1741, Ames satirized critics of Whitefield in "To the Scoffers at Mr. Whitefield's Preaching." Four years later, Whitefield came to Ames' hometown of Dedham to give one of his sermons.

The Old Farmer's Almanac, a popular annual publication in existence since 1792, copied the format used in the Ames' Almanack. This included page headings with the corresponding zodiac sign; left margin noting movable feasts, lines from a poem relevant to that month; phases of the moon; weather predictions; and anniversaries.

Some early colonists used the blank pages of the almanac to keep personal diaries. The American Antiquarian Society collection in Worcester, Massachusetts holds at least two of these diaries, including that of Reverend Thomas Balch (1759). Ebenezer Gay, a pastor at the Church at Hingham in Hingham, Massachusetts similarly recorded his visits to Boston and days of prayer in his copy of the Ames Almanack.
