= Deborah Fisher =

Tavern owner in Dedham, MA, US (b. 1723, d. 1817)

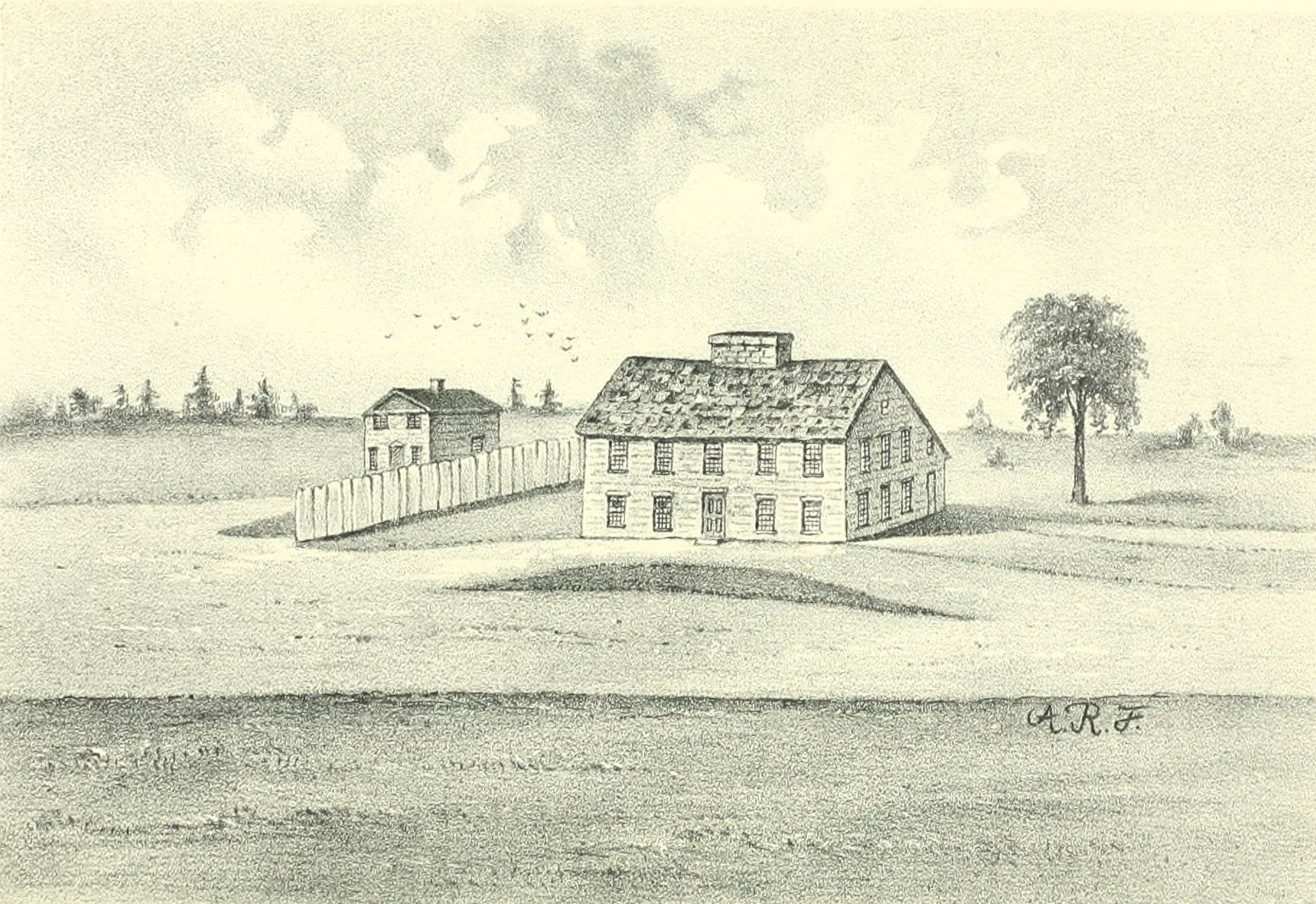
Ames tavern

Deborah Fisher (October 30, 1723 – November 10, 1817), later Deborah Ames and Deborah Woodward, was a tavern owner in Dedham, Massachusetts.

== Personal life ==
Born on October 30, 1723, Fisher was the youngest child of Jeremiah and Deborah (née Richards) Fisher.

Fisher was the second wife Nathaniel Ames, marrying him on October 30, 1742. Deborah and Nathaniel Ames had five children, Nathaniel, Seth, Deborah, William, and Fisher Ames. (Note: Fisher Ames had a half brother, also named Fisher Ames, through his father and his father's first wife.)

When she and her second husband, Richard Woodward, sued a relative over the will and estate of her father, they hired John Adams as their lawyer. After they divorced, she was known as Mrs. Ames again.

Deborah died on November 10, 1817, at which time her tavern was torn down. Ames Street in Dedham is named for her and her family.

== Ames' Tavern ==
Nathaniel's first wife was Fisher's cousin, Mary. Through this marriage, Nathaniel came into possession of Fisher's Tavern, which was founded by one of Fisher's distant relatives, Joshua Fisher. After Nathaniel died, Fisher inherited it.

After her husband Nathaniel died in 1764, Fisher successfully ran the tavern for several years with the help of several of her sons. (Note: Her son, Nathaniel Ames, was not interested in the tavern and had little to do with it.) According to a later family biography, "inn keeping was a favorite occupation with her and she carried natters with a high hand." Befitting her position as an inn keeper, she was astutely interested in politics. Fisher "hated the Jacobins devoutly." As an inn keeper, she was compared to Meg Dods, the innkeeper in the 19th century novel Saint Ronan's Well. She has been described as "a very shrewd and sensible woman of a strong and singular cast of mind."

In 1772, she married Richard Woodward and her home became known as the Woodward Tavern. It was an unhappy marriage, however, and the couple divorced by 1784. Before they did, however, the convention that adopted the Suffolk Resolves met in the tavern and began their work.

== Works cited ==
- Bernhard, Winfred E. A. (1965). Fisher Ames, Federalist and Statesman, 1758-1808. Williamsburg, VA: Institute of Early American History and Culture.
- Briggs, Sam, ed. (1891). The Essays, Humor, and Poems of Nathaniel Ames, Father and Son, of Dedham, Massachusetts, from Their Almanacks, 1726-1775. With Notes and Comments by Sam. Briggs.
- Fisher, Phillip A. (1898). The Fisher Genealogy: A Record of the Descendants of Joshua, Anthony, and Cornelius Fisher, of Dedham, Mass., 1630-1640. Massachusetts Publishing Company. ISBN 978-0-608-32125-7.
- Hanson, Robert Brand (1976). Dedham, Massachusetts, 1635-1890. Dedham Historical Society.
