= Walpole, Massachusetts, in the American Revolution =

The town of Walpole, Massachusetts, participated in the years leading up to and through the Revolutionary War in various ways.

== Pre-Revolutionary War years ==
Even before the Revolution began in earnest, Walpole was prepared to join forces with American patriots to prevent a usurpation of the people's rights. On September 21, 1768, the town of Walpole "Voted that they Send one Person to join the Committees at Faniuel Hall." The town agreed to send Joshua Clapp as its representative. The next day, Clapp joined representatives of 96 towns and eight districts to consider measures for the peace and safety of Massachusetts citizens.

After the British sailed into Boston Harbor on September 28, 1768, Walpole took a new interest in the affairs outside her own boundaries. Walpole elected its first representative, Capt. Seth Kingsbury, to the General Court on May 29, 1769. He was succeeded the following year by Clapp.

Early in 1773, the town called a special town meeting for the "Consideration of the Many Grievances that the Province and Colonies Labour under ..." On January 12, 1773, Walpole voted "That it is the opinion of this Town that our Rights and liberties are Infringed upon which is a great Grievance." The town then appointed a committee – composed of Ensign Seth Bullard, Enoch Ellis, Dr. Samuel Cheney, George Payson, and Aquila Robbins – to draft instructions to guide their future representatives.

=== The Suffolk Resolves and Walpole ===
In August 1774, town meetings became illegal in Massachusetts, but Walpole defied authority and held one on August 29, 1774. At this meeting, the town chose "Deligats" to meet committees of other towns in Suffolk County "in order to Consult what measures is Proper to be taken for the Safety of the County." Nathaniel Guild, Enoch Ellis, and Dr. Samuel Cheney were chosen.

After a series of deliberations between the representatives of Suffolk County, all met on September 9, 1774, at Daniel Vose's home in Milton to adopt the Suffolk Resolves. The document was the most revolutionary product the Colonies had produced at the time, and the only one of the 19 resolutions in which members of committees or towns were named included Walpole: "15. That under our present Circumstances it is incumbent on us to encourage Arts and Manufactures amongst us by all Means in our Power, and that Joseph Palmer, Esq.; of Braintree, Mr. Ebenezer Dorr of Roxbury, Mr. James Boies and Mr. Edward Preston of Milton, and Mr. Nathaniel Guild of Walpole, be and hereby are appointed a Committee to consider the best Ways and Means to promote and establish the same, and report to this Convention as soon as may be."

=== The Massachusetts Provincial Congress and Walpole ===
Walpole participated in the Massachusetts Provincial Congress following the Suffolk Resolves. On September 23, 1774, the town voted to have Enoch Ellis "Joyn in and with a Provincial Congress to be held where the Provincial Congress shall appoint." Simultaneously, the town took the first steps towards preparing for armed conflict as they appointed Capt. Ebenezer Clapp and Ensign Theodore Mann to "Purchas Two field Peices."

On December 5, 1774, the Provincial Congress called on towns to carry out the plans of the Continental Congress to boycott British goods. Several days later, on December 19, Walpole appointed Dr. Samuel Cheney, Enoch Ellis, Nicholas Harris, John Boyden, Phillip Robbins, Ensign Theodore Mann, and Nathaniel Guild to the Committee of Inspection. Later on Capt. Seth Bullard, Aquilla Robins, George Payson, Capt. Joseph Hartshorn, Joseph Day, Joshua Clapp Jr., Capt. Jeremiah Smith, Aaron Blake, and John Lewis were added to the committee as well. In an effort to aid Boston while the Port of Boston remained closed, the town voted on December 30, 1774, to provide wood to "Suffering Industrous Poor in the Town of Boston."

Walpole formed its minutemen on January 9, 1775, where the town voted "one Quarter Part of the Training Band Soldiars Should be Inlisted in the Province Service to be Ready at a miniutes warning." Walpole's minutemen were paid two schillings every day they were called together, while William Fisher, Esq. Clapp, and Capt. Seth Kingsbury were named to make arrangements for drill.

== Start of the Revolution ==
A few days before the Battle of Lexington and Concord, Walpole resident Philip Robbins took a trip to Boston. While at tavern, Robbins overheard a group of British soldiers claiming it would be easy for General Gage to march through the country from Boston to New York. Robbins confronted these men and said, "Friends [...] you are much mistaken. You have as good officers and men as there are in the world; but Americans will fight better without officers than your men with officers. If you go out into the country in a riotous way they will take your men two to one and cut them all off for breakfast." The British soldiers called Robbins a traitor and placed him under arrest for several hours.

=== Battle of Lexington and Concord ===
In the early morning hours of April 19, 1775, Robbins, Capt. Jeremiah Smith, and Lieut. John Boyden left Walpole set for Boston with wood for the struggling city. As the trio arrived in Roxbury, they learned that the British were marching towards Lexington and that the minutemen call had been called upon. Robbins, Smith, and Boyden immediately got horses and headed for Walpole. All of the men were officers in one of Walpole's militia companies – Robbins was a first lieutenant, Boyden was a second lieutenant, and Smith was a captain. The men reached town around noon, just as the news of the British heading towards Lexington also reached the citizens. They hurriedly assembled 64 men and headed to meet the British.

At the same time, another Walpole company, under Capt. Seth Bullard with Lt. Eliphalet Ellis and Ensign Enoch Ellis, of 67 men marched to Lexington as well. Twenty-nine Walpole men appeared on the rolls of Capt. Sabin Man's Medfield and Walpole company too. In all, "at least 160 Walpole men out of a population of less than 800 marched in answer to the alarm." These soldiers most likely did not participate in any action as Smith's men arrived in Cambridge after the day's fighting concluded.

On May 17, 1775, Walpole selectmen ordered the town treasurer Mr. Benjamin Kingsbury to pay some of Capt. Seth Bullard's minutemen's service during Lexington. Among the Walpole minutemen included Levi Lindley, John Laurence, Elias Mann, Peter Lyon, Daniel Morse, Jeremiah Smith, James Fales Jr., Benjamin Carroll, and Andrew Willett.

=== Siege of Boston ===
By April 21, 1775, 20,000 Americans flanked Boston and many of the Rhode Island and Connecticut soldiers came through Walpole on their way. Walpole soldiers were among those that assembled around Boston. Some quit their soldiering after only four days, while the longest term was for 11 days; however, many returned to ranks after the Massachusetts Provincial Congress voted on April 23 to raise a force of 30,000.

Among the companies of Col. Joseph Read's regiment in "Camp at Roxbury, May 18th, 1775", was one company commanded by Capt. Seth Bullard. This company was not a Walpole militia, but composed mainly of Walpole and Medfield men. Bullard's lieutenant was Thomas Pettee of Walpole, while Ezekeil Plimpton of Medfield was the ensign.

On December 4, 1775, Capt. Jeremiah Smith's company of 64 men marched from Walpole to Boston to fill the places of departing Connecticut troops. Around the same date, a company led by Capt. Ephraim Cheney of Medfield, along with First Lieutenant John Boyden of Walpole, answered the same call. As 1775 drew to a close, Walpole men could be found in camps at Roxbury and Prospect Hill, present day Somerville.

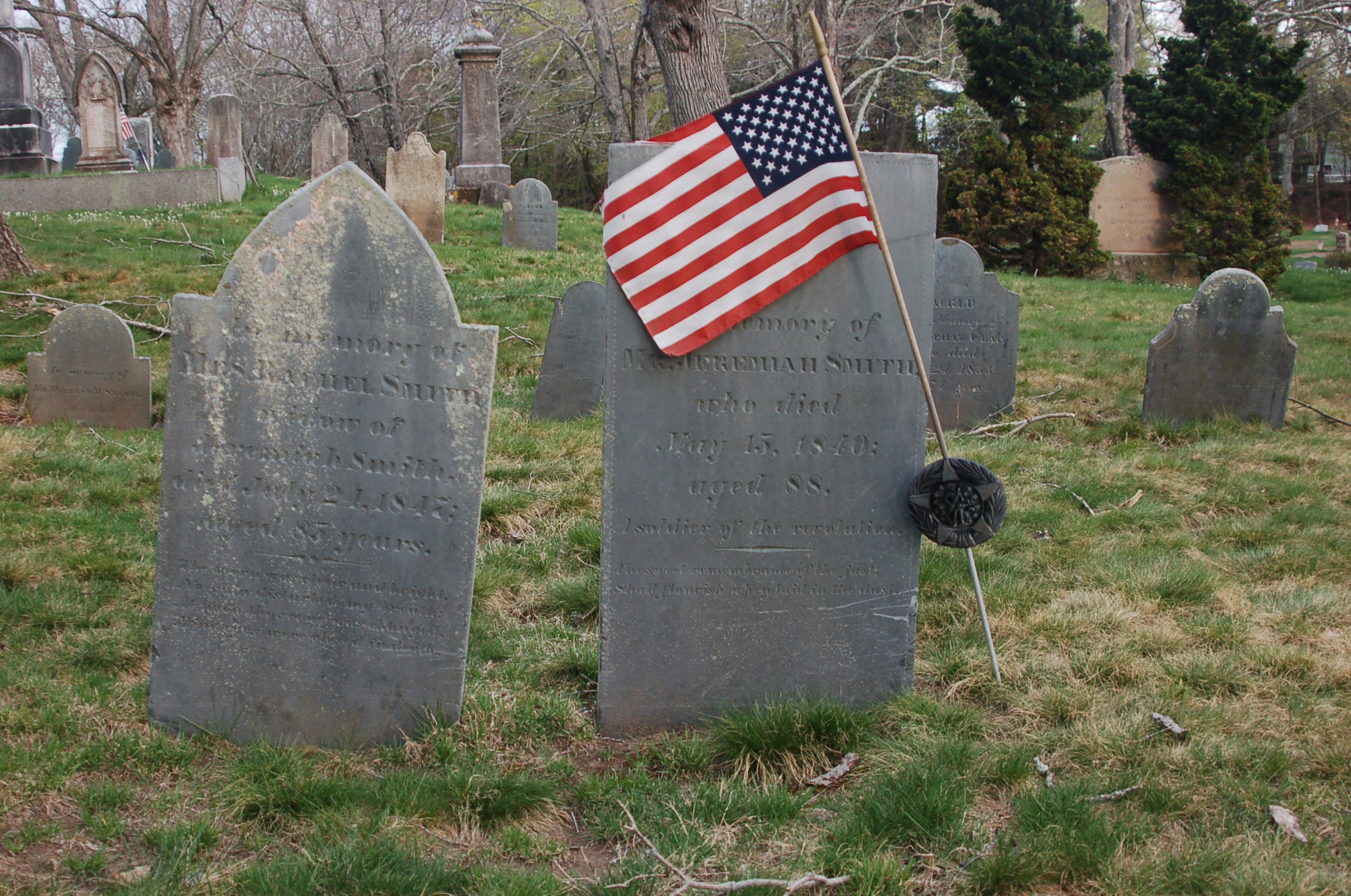
Capt. Jeremiah Smith's grave in Walpole, Massachusetts

== 1776 ==
On March 27, 1776, 25 Walpole men are found on the rolls of company under Capt. Aaron Guild, with First Lieutenant John Boyden. These men had enlisted on January 27, and helped to fortify the works on Dorchester Heights, which forced Gen. Howe to evacuate Boston on March 17. The men were on duty as late as the following June, and were stationed in Hull during the summer and fall.

On April 5, 1776, Gen. Washington passed through Walpole on his way to New York. The story goes that Washington passed through present-day Lincoln Road, stopped at the Smith household where Zilpha Smith gave Washington a drink of water from a gourd.

On May 10, 1776, Walpole voted unanimously "that, if the Honble Continental Congress should declare these Colonies Independant [sic] of ye Kingdom of Great Britain, that they would support them [Congress] in the Measure with their Lives and Fortunes."

In December 1776, Rhode Island called an alarm as the British anchored in Newport Harbor and had taken control of the colony. Two companies of Walpole minutemen took up arms to answer Gov. Nicholas Cooke's appeal and stayed for three weeks. One company was led by Joshua Clapp with Lt. Andrew Willett of 34 officers and men, while the other company was led by Capt. Oliver Clapp with Lt. Eben Fales, along with 30 officers and men.

== 1777 and on ==
On September 23, 1777, the two Walpole companies that marched on Newport were merged into one with Capt. Oliver Clapp as the new commander, Timothy Mann as first lieutenant, and Andrew Willett as second lieutenant. The company became part of Col. Benjamin Hawes' 4th Suffolk regiment, of which Seth Bullard was major. Capt. Clapp led Walpole men in defense of Warwick, Rhode Island.

In March 1778, the town voted to grant £5,000 "to be assessed on the polls and estates to carry on the war."

In June 1779, Capt. Clapp resigned after active service and was succeeded by Timothy Mann.

In July 1780, Capt. Timothy Mann's company of 44 officers and men marched to Rhode Island.

In celebration of the peace between the new United States of America and Great Britain, Walpole held a Peace Ball in Ebenezer Fales' house on Kendall Street.

== Legacy ==
Walpole has honored its Revolutionary War veterans in a number of ways throughout the years. Numerous roads and streets throughout the town are named in honor of the veterans, such as Clapp Street, Guild Street, and Bullard Street. One of the town's four elementary schools is named after the family of John Boyden.

== Notable Walpole Soldiers ==
- Holland Wood – Fought under Washington. During the Battle of Monmouth, Wood drew off a cannon from the field without assistance so that the enemy could not capture it. It is reported that Wood grasped the dismounted cannon and it was "so hot that it burnt through to his very flesh, and unaided, amid the wild cheers of his smoke-begrimed comrades, set it in position again and continued firing.
- Josiah Barden – Fought at the Battle of Trenton.
- David Wilkinson – Fought under Benedict Arnold when he went over to the British.
- Ebenezer Clapp – Lieutenant colonel of Read's regiment. Clapp had been an officer of the old provincial establishment under the Crown, appearing as an ensign in Seth Kingsbury's Walpole company in 1766. Clapp would go on to become the highest rank in active field service of any Walpole man during the Revolution. Clapp went with the Continental Army to New York City as a lieutenant colonel in Col. Loammi Baldwin's regiment in June 1776.
- Timothy Mann – Born in 1746, died in 1843 after living 97 years. He was a private in the Col. Benjamin Hawes (4th Suffolk County) Regiment of Massachusetts militia on September 23, 1777. Mann was commissioned an officer on September 27, 1777. On June 19, 1789, Mann was appointed lieutenant colonel of the 5th Regiment in the 2nd Brigade and First Division of the Militia, County of Suffolk. On May 11, 1791, Mann was appointed to colonel.

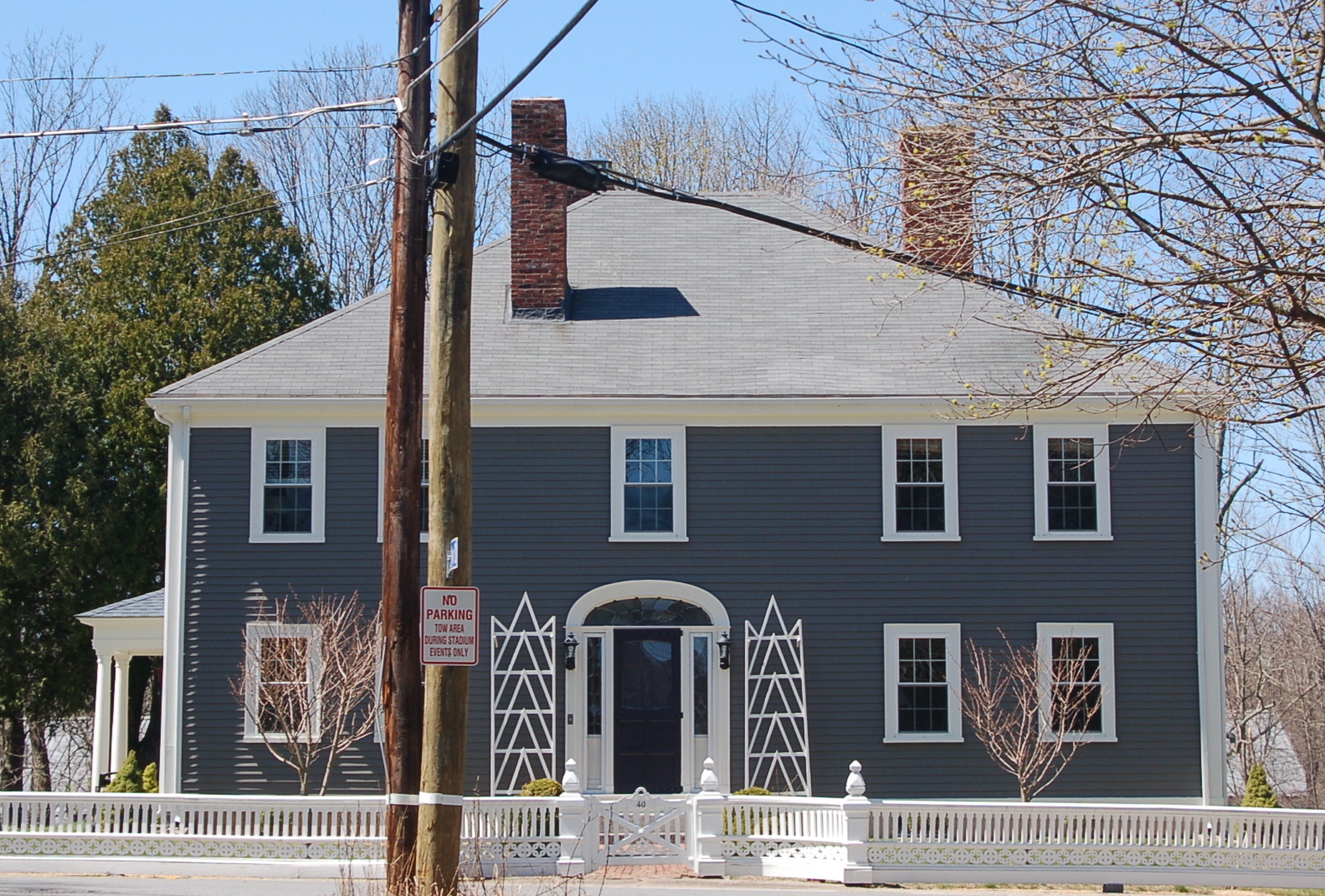
Col. Timothy Mann's house in South Walpole

== See also ==
- Dedham, Massachusetts, in the American Revolution
