= Ames Tavern =

Tavern in Dedham, Massachusetts

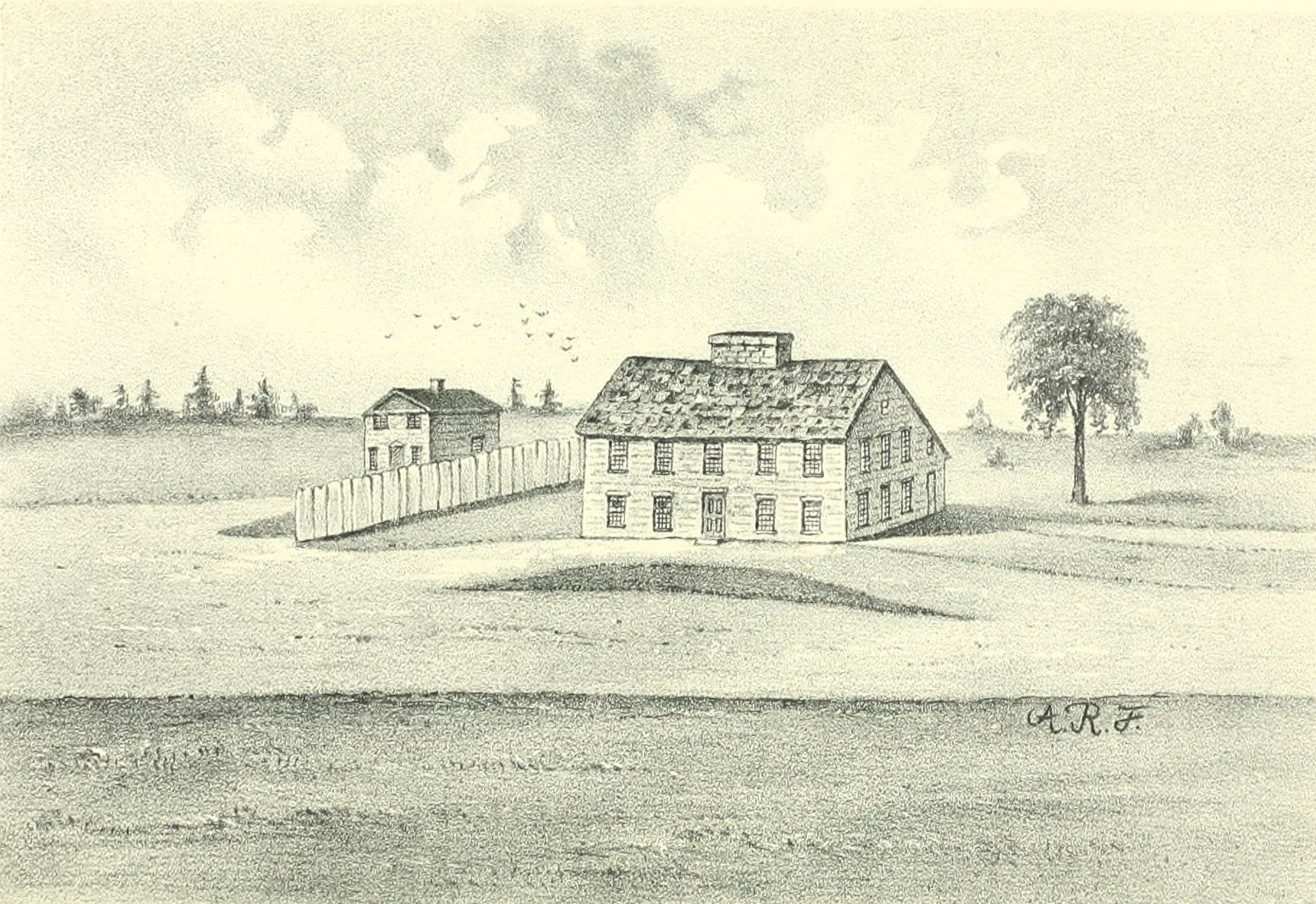
Ames tavern

The Ames Tavern was a tavern in Dedham, Massachusetts. Founded as Fisher's Tavern in 1649 by Joshua Fisher, it eventually passed into the hands of Nathaniel Ames through a complicated lawsuit based on colonial laws of inheritance. It was eventually owned by Richard Woodward, who renamed it the Woodward Tavern by the time the convention that adopted the Suffolk Resolves met there.

== Fisher's Tavern ==
After Michael Powell left Dedham for Boston in 1649, it left the town without a tavern keeper. Joshua Fisher then opened Fisher's Tavern in what is present day Dedham Square, at the corner of Ames and High Streets, near "the keye where the first settlers' landed." Just across the street was a piece of unoccupied land including that on which the Norfolk County Courthouse now stands.

Fisher brewed his own malt liquor and had a tap room at his house and a drinking room at the brew house. Given the distance from Boston, the General Court agreed on May 9, 1649, to free Dedham from the tax levied on wine. They also granted Fisher the right to serve "strong waters." Should anyone get drunk at his establishment, though, he would be fined 10 shillings. A colony law also required him to close down during the time church services were held.

His tavern was passed down to his son, Joshua. About this time the old tavern was raised six inches higher, the walk filled with bricks, it was fitted with closets, and was completely furnished. After his death in 1730, it was passed down to his son, also named Joshua.

== Ames' Tavern ==
=== Inheritance dispute ===
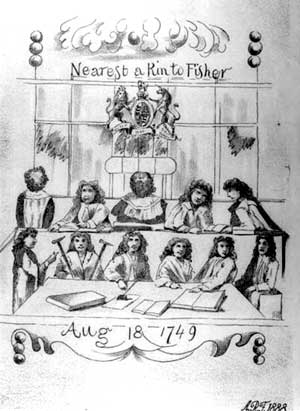
Sketch of the sign that hung outside the Ames Tavern in Dedham, Massachusetts

After Joshua Fisher died in 1730, he left a life estate to his wife, Hannah, with residual rights to his daughters. Nathaniel Ames moved to Dedham, and into the Tavern, in 1732. He married Joshua and Hannah's daughter Mary (Note: After being rejected by her sister Rebecca.) in 1735 and the two took up residence in the Tavern. Ames then, presumably with the approval of his mother-in-law, began running the tavern himself.

Mary and Nathaniel Ames had a son, Fisher Ames, (Note: This Fisher Ames had a half brother, also named Fisher Ames.) in October 1737. Mary died a month later, however, leaving her rights in the tavern to baby Fisher. Fisher Ames died the following September. Nathaniel Ames continued to run the tavern, though he moved out in 1740 when he married Mary's cousin, Deborah Fisher.

Hannah did not die until 1744, at which point Joshua Fisher's other daughters and their husbands declared that they should inherit the very profitable tavern. Nathaniel Ames, who was litigious by nature, objected and filed a brief in probate court. He said that while under common law inheritances could only descend, a provincial law passed in 1692 allowed for inheritances to ascend. In this case, he claimed, the rights to the tavern flowed from Joshua Fisher to his widow, Hannah Fisher (who only had a life estate), to her daughter Mary Ames, to her son Fisher Ames, and then up to Nathaniel Ames.

Mary's sister, Hannah, and her husband, Benjamin Gay, her sister Judith, and her husband, John Simpson, and Samuel Richards, the widower of Mary's sister Rebecca, all opposed Nathaniel Ames with an appeal to common law. Nathaniel Ames won, but Benjamin Gay took physical possession of the property. When Ames took him to the Inferior Court of Judicature to evict him, Gay prevailed and the courts assessed Ames with court fees. Ames appealed to the Superior Court of Judicature, but lost again. Ames went back again to the Superior Court, this time getting a hearing before the full court and a jury. This time he won on a 5–2 vote.

Ames was incensed that he did not receive a unanimous opinion, however. He hung a sign out of front of the tavern, which was now officially his, that showed Benjamin Lynde and Paul Dudley, the two justices who voted against him, with their backs to books containing the laws of the province. When the judges heard about the sign, they dispatched the sheriff to go retrieve it so that they could see it for themselves. Word got to Ames faster than the sheriff did, however, so when the official pulled up to the tavern he found a new sign that simply stated "Matthew 12:39." Upon consulting a Bible, the sheriff read "A wicked and adulterous generation seeketh after a sign but there shall be no sign given unto it."

=== Rivalry with Gay's Tavern ===
Gay's Tavern, originally located on Court Street, was established in 1749 by Benjamin Gay. Benjamin and Nathaniel Ames had a rivalry, with Ames once writing in the Ames Almanack that people should not believe the rumors Benjamin was spreading about his establishment.

=== Visitors ===
Benjamin Franklin stayed at the tavern on October 12, 1763. Thomas Jefferson ate breakfast there on June 18, 1784 as he toured the northern states before departing for Europe as an ambassador from the Congress of the Confederation. Years later, Fisher Ames would become one of his bitterest political opponents.

Faith Huntington's funeral was held at the Samuel Dexter House on November 28, 1775 and she was buried in the tomb of Nathaniel Ames. Following the funeral, the mourners went to the Ames Tavern.

== Woodward Tavern ==
After Nathaniel Ames died in 1764, his widow Deborah ran it for several years with the help of several of her sons. (Note: Her son, Nathaniel Ames, was not interested in the tavern and had little to do with it.) In 1772, she married Richard Woodward and it became known as the Woodward Tavern. It was an unhappy marriage, however, and the couple divorced by 1784. Before he did, however, the convention that adopted the Suffolk Resolves met in the tavern and began their work.

Deborah died in 1817, at which time the tavern was torn down.

== Building ==
The public house featured a "Great Room" with a large fieldstone fireplace. In the summer, the room was filled with asparagus, smoke tree, and green shrubs. On the high desk, next to the quill pens, was the tavern's account book.

It was a roomy, two story, peaked roof old building. The end towards the street was the oldest part, but it had an addition of more modern construction to the front. The rooms were low, the windows small, and the lower floor was sunken a little below the ground. There was no fence between the house and the street, and the intervening space was covered with grass of that thick and stubbed growth peculiar to such localities. Behind it was a large barn while on both sides, and back for so or 1,000 feet (300 m) to the Charles River, stretched a broad field of irregular surface.

== Works cited ==
- Austin, Walter (1912). Tale of a Dedham Tavern: History of the Norfolk Hotel, Dedham, Massachusetts. Priv. print. at the Riverside Press.
- Fisher, Phillip A. (1898). The Fisher Genealogy: A Record of the Descendants of Joshua, Anthony, and Cornelius Fisher, of Dedham, Mass., 1630-1640. Massachusetts Publishing Company. ISBN 978-0-608-32125-7.
- Hanson, Robert Brand (1976). Dedham, Massachusetts, 1635-1890. Dedham Historical Society.
- Stowell, Marion Barber (1977). Early American Almanacs: the Colonial Weekday Bible. Ayer Publishing. ISBN 0-89102-063-2.
- Smith, Frank (1936). A History of Dedham, Massachusetts. Transcript Press, Incorporated.
- Warren, Charles (1931). Jacobin and Junto: Or, Early American Politics as Viewed in the Diary of Dr. Nathaniel Ames, 1758-1822. Harvard University Press.

42.2490753°N 71.175180°W
