= Joshua Fisher (born 1675) =

Captain Joshua Fisher (February 4, 1675 - March 11, 1730) represented Dedham, Massachusetts in the Great and General Court in 1725 and 1726.

== Personal life ==
Fisher was born February 4, 1675, to Joshua and Esther (née Wiswall) Fisher.

He married Hannah Gay in 1695. They had five daughters, Hannah, Mary, Rebecca, Judith, and Sarah. Mary married Nathaniel Ames.

He died March 11, 1730.

== Career ==
He inherited Fisher's Tavern from his father, Joshua. It was founded by his grandfather, also named Lieutenant Joshua Fisher. Upon his death he left it to his widow.

== Works cited ==
- Fisher, Phillip A. (1898). The Fisher Genealogy: A Record of the Descendants of Joshua, Anthony, and Cornelius Fisher, of Dedham, Mass., 1630-1640. Massachusetts Publishing Company. ISBN 978-0-608-32125-7.
- Hanson, Robert Brand (1976). Dedham, Massachusetts, 1635-1890. Dedham Historical Society.
