= Suffolk Resolves House =

Historic house in Massachusetts, United States

- U.S. National Register of Historic Places
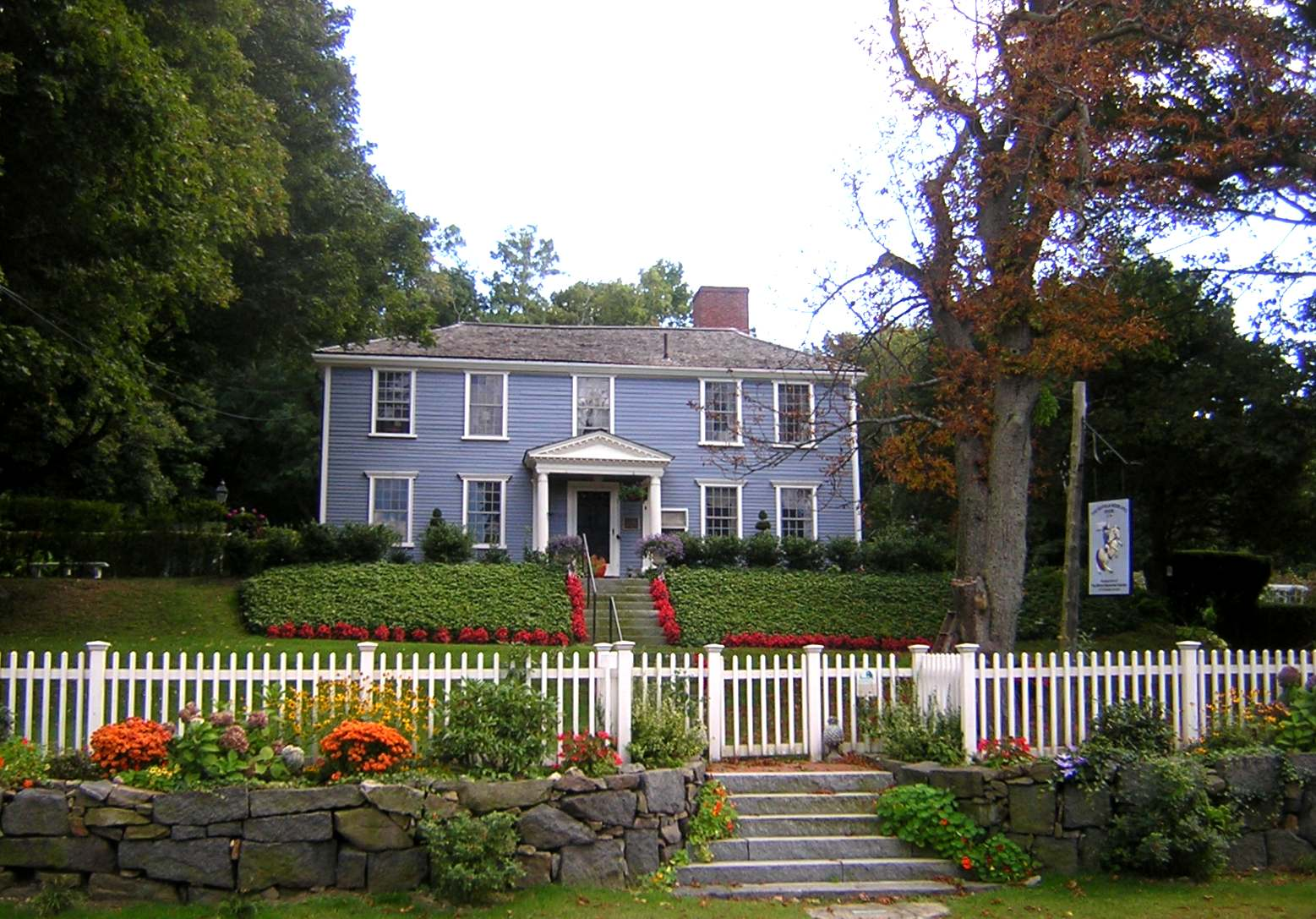

- Location within Massachusetts Location within the United States
- Location: 1370 Canton Ave., Milton, Massachusetts
- Coordinates: 42°14′3″N 71°6′31″W
- Area: less than one acre
- Built: 1763
- Architectural style: Georgian
- NRHP reference No.: 73000308
- Added to NRHP: July 23, 1973

The Suffolk Resolves House, also known as the Daniel Vose House, is a historic house at 1370 Canton Avenue in Milton, Massachusetts. It has long been claimed that this building was where the Suffolk Resolves were signed on September 4, 1774. The Resolves were an important predecessor document to the 1774 Continental Association and the 1776 Declaration of Independence; however, this claim has been the subject of local controversy. The house is now owned by the Milton Historical Society and serves as its headquarters; it is occasionally open to the public. The house was listed on the National Register of Historic Places in 1973.

== Description and history ==
The Suffolk Resolves House is located in a residential area of southwestern Milton, on the southeast side of Canton Avenue, historically a major route connecting Milton to nearby Canton. The house is a two-story wood frame structure, with a clapboarded exterior and hip roof pierced by symmetrically placed brick chimneys. The main facade faces northwest to the street, from which the house is separated by a series of landscaped terraces. The facade is five bays wide, with sash windows placed symmetrically around a center entrance. The entrance is sheltered by a porch supported by Doric columns and topped by a dentillated triangular pediment.

Dendrochronological research on the structure of the house indicates that its oldest part, roughly the left front half, was built using timbers cut in 1763. The right side and portions of the roof have timbers cut in the 1780s. The historical record is ambiguous on whether the older portion of the house was the site of the Suffolk Resolves meeting on September 4, 1774. What is known is that the house commonly known as the Daniel Vose "mansion", burned down in 1861. This house is more likely to be a home built for Vose's son, Daniel Thomas Vose, in the 1780s. This chronology is at odds with a long-held belief, maintained by the Milton Historical Society over the objections of some local figures in mid-20th century and enshrined in the National Register nomination of the 1970s, that this house's parlor was where the Suffolk Resolves were signed.

This building was threatened with demolition in 1950. Dr. James Bourne Ayer and Hannah Ayer moved it from its original location on Adams Street (where Citizens Bank now is) to its present location. They had it restored by William Morris Hunt and later gave it to the Milton Historical Society, for which it serves as headquarters. The Society holds its meetings at the house, and occasionally opens it to the public.

== Gallery ==
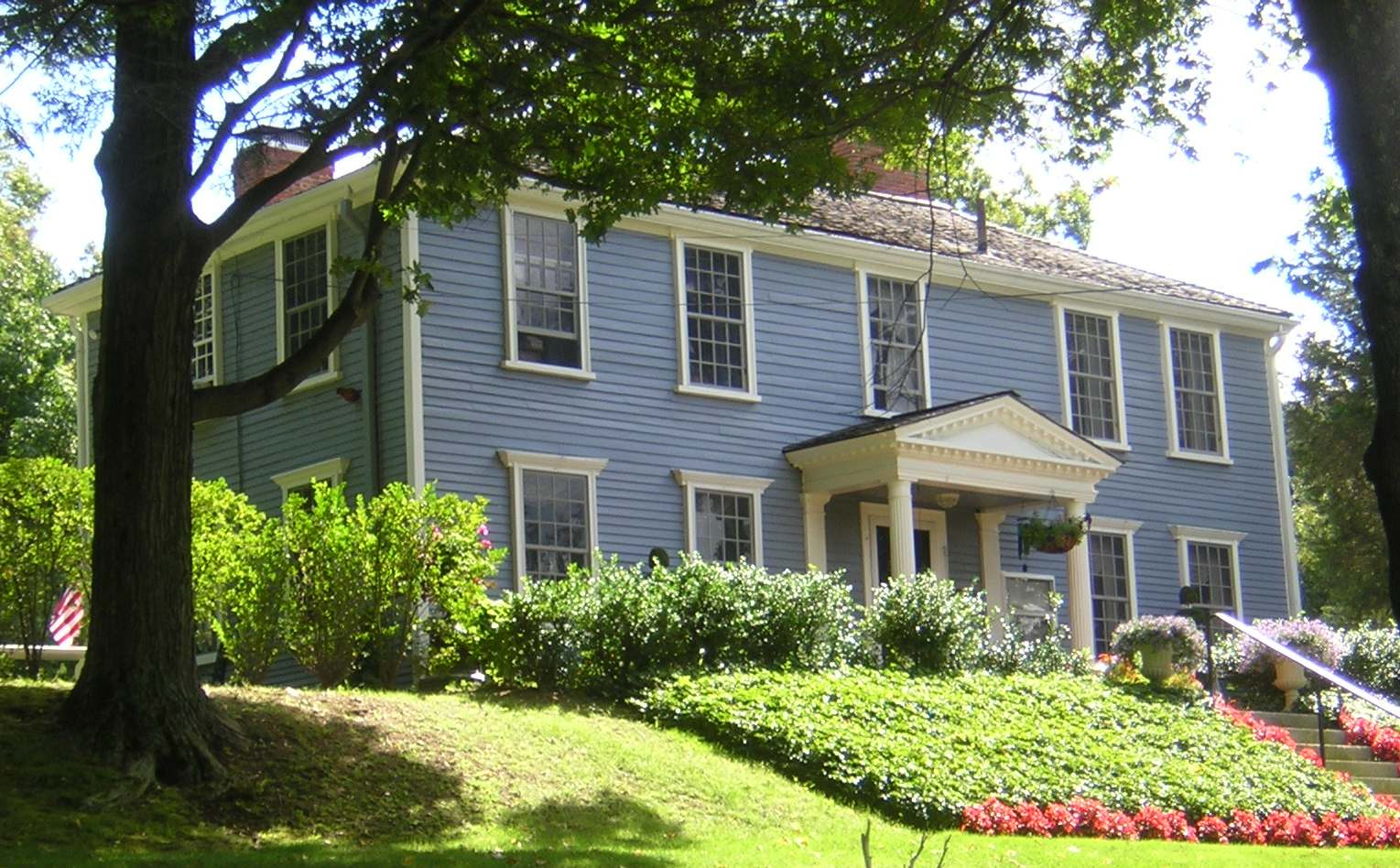
View from north

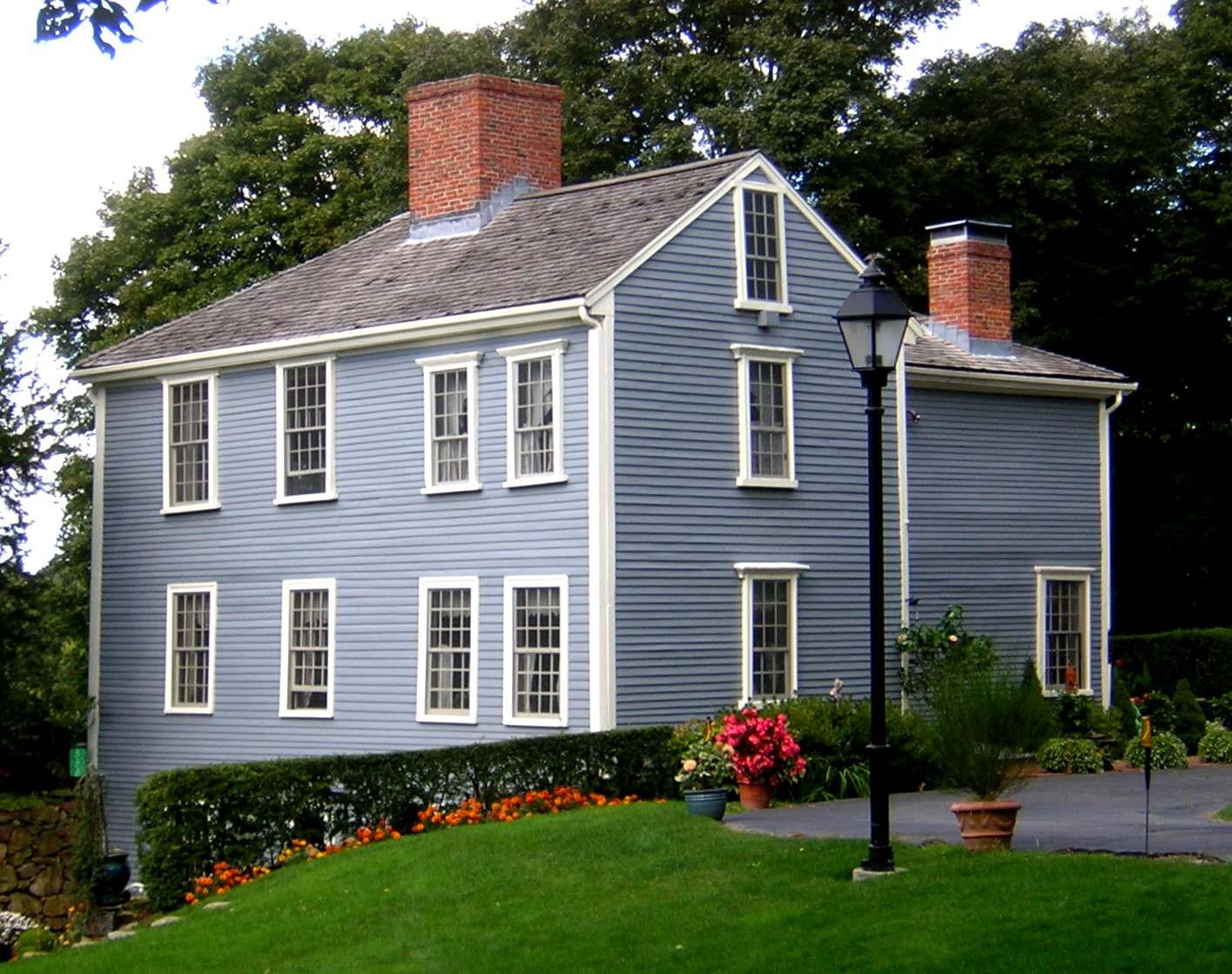
View from south

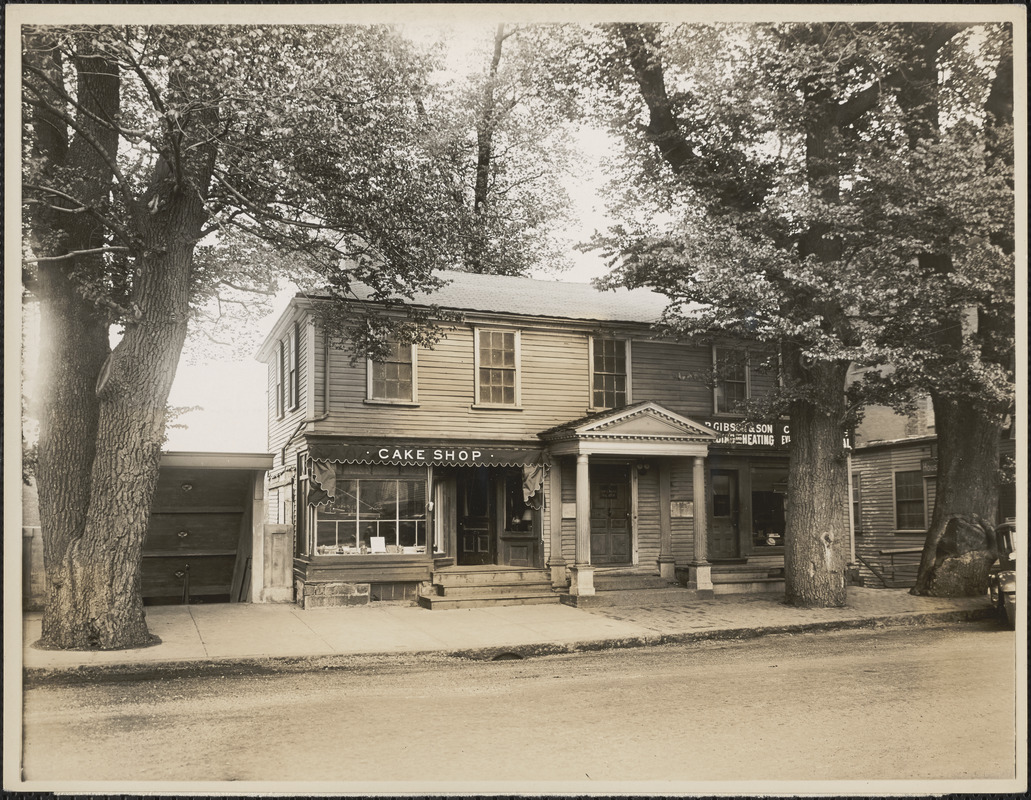
The house in 1930 while on Adams Street

== See also ==
- National Register of Historic Places listings in Milton, Massachusetts
- Carpenter's Hall
