= John Sprague (doctor) =

American physician (1718–1797)

John Sprague (1718–1797) was an early American physician.

== Personal life ==
Born in 1718, he was graduated from Harvard College in 1737. Around 1770, he moved to Dedham, Massachusetts.

He married Elizabeth Dalhonde (Note: Elizabeth was born in 1757) in 1745. After Elizabeth died in 1757, he married Esther Harrison (Note: Esther lived from 1728 to 1811 and was the widow of Charles Harrison, who died in 1769.) in 1770. He had a son, Lawrence, who was an assistant to William Montague at a school in Dorchester.

Sprague owned two homes in Dedham's Low Plains, both of which burned in 1765. He then built a mansion, 75 by 25 feet (22.9 m × 7.6 m). He died in 1797.

== Career ==
He lived in Cambridge and studied medicine in Boston with Doctors Louis Dalhonde and William Douglass. He later opened his own practice in Boston. While living in Dedham, he treated Faith Huntington for depression.

He had a reputation as an excellent diagnostician. He was a charter member of the Massachusetts Medical Society.

== Politics ==
He was active in the patriot cause and was friends with John Adams and Robert Treat Paine. He was a delegate to the Massachusetts Constitutional Convention of 1779–1780. He was a member of the Sons of Liberty.

On January 9, 1777, John Adams stayed at Sprague's home as he rode to Baltimore, Maryland to attend the Second Continental Congress.

== Works cited ==
- Ames, Nathaniel (1998). Hanson, Robert Brand Hanson (ed.). The Diary of Dr. Nathaniel Ames of Dedham, Massachusetts, 1758-1822. Picton Press.
- Hanson, Robert Brand (1976). Dedham, Massachusetts, 1635–1890. Dedham Historical Society.
- Slafter, Carlos (1905). A Record of Education: The Schools and Teachers of Dedham, Massachusetts, 1644–1904. Dedham Transcript Press.
