= Faith Huntington =

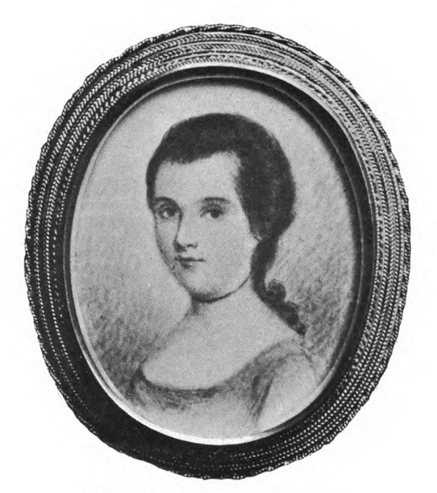
- Born: Faith Trumbull; 25 January 1742; Lebanon, Connecticut, British America
- Died: 24 November 1775 (aged 33); Dedham, Massachusetts, British America
- Spouse: Jedediah Huntington (m. 1766)
- Children: 1 son
- Parent: Jonathan Trumbull

Faith Trumbull Huntington (January 25, 1742 - November 24, 1775) was a Colonial American woman who lived during the American Revolutionary War.

== Early and personal life ==
Huntington was born in 1742 in Lebanon, Connecticut, the daughter of Governor Jonathan Trumbull and his wife, Faith née Robinson. She was the sister of John Trumbull. Since her parents valued education, Faith and her siblings attended private school. At age 10, Faith went to Boston, Massachusetts to attend finishing school, where she trained in needlepoint. Faith Trumbull studied under Elizabeth Murray, a powerful businesswoman in Revolutionary Boston.

At a young age, Faith also developed her skills as a painter. Faith’s younger brother, Revolutionary era artist John Trumbull, credited her work as his inspiration: "She had acquired some knowledge of drawing, and had even painted in oil, two heads and a landscape. These wonders were hung in my mother’s parlor, and were among the first objects that caught my infant eye. I endeavored to imitate them."

She married Jedediah Huntington on May 1, 1766, and the couple lived in Norwich, Connecticut. On September 17, 1767, they had a son, Jabez. Following her death, Jabez, who was eight at the time, went to live with his maternal grandparents for the duration of the American Revolution.

== American Revolution ==
The Huntington family, and Jedediah in particular, risked and lost a great deal when they made a total commitment to the revolutionary cause. While many businessmen made large profits from their dealing with the army, the Huntington fortune suffered from Jedediah's long absence. Her brother John served as adjutant to the Second Connecticut Regiment, briefly as aide-de-camp to General George Washington, then as a brigade major.

Huntington’s sister-in-law, Hannah Huntington, found her husband’s departure to fight in Cambridge particularly distressing. To support Hannah, the Huntington and Trumbull siblings planned a trip to Dedham, Massachusetts to reunite her with her husband, Joshua.

Huntington herself became a victim of the war. Huntington and a group of her friends went to visit her brother and the army in their camp in Roxbury, outside Boston. On their way, the axle of their carriage was broken in an accident on June 13 near Providence, and their journey was delayed. They eventually arrived on arriving on June 17, 1775. Instead of a glamorous and exciting military display, they witnessed the brutality of the Battle of Bunker Hill.

The realization that this might be the fate of her brothers and husband seems to have been too much for Huntington, and she began experiencing episodes of serious depression. Though at times she felt "calm tranquility and composure," they would eventually give way to "great and surprising pain and distortion."

Her brother John later said that she "found herself surrounded, not by ‘the pomp and circumstances of glorious war,’ but in the midst of all its horrible realities. She saw too clearly the life of danger and hardship upon which her husband and her favorite brother had entered, and it overcame her strong, but too sensitive mind."

The family returned to Connecticut after their unfortunate trip to Boston. By July, Jedediah received his commission as a colonel in the Continental army and returned to Roxbury. This left Huntington alone once again. For a few weeks, she resumed the role of a supportive military wife. Soon though, Jedediah's absence began to greatly affect Huntington. She also wrote to him that she “[hoped] the Unhappy Dispute may be Put to an happy Isue [sic] truly before Winter or I know not how I Shall Live through So Long an Absence from my Companion.”

As these bouts grew worse, and as Jedediah, who was in Boston, did not feel he could leave his men, he and his mother brought Faith to stay with friends in Dedham, where he could visit her frequently. There, she was treated for depression by Dr. John Sprague.

== Death and burial ==
On November 24, 1775, shortly after one of these visits, she hanged herself with "a small cord." Her funeral was held at the Samuel Dexter House, where she had been living, on November 28, 1775. The service was led by Rev. Jason Haven and attended by a large crowd, including those she did not know from Dedham and the Army camped nearby. Following the funeral, the mourners went to the Ames Tavern.

She was buried in the tomb of Nathaniel Ames. While the tomb was open and awaiting her corpse, Jabez Fitch, a soldier from Connecticut who served under Jedediah, entered the tomb with a few companions and discovered Ames' corpse. (Note: Fitch served at the Siege of Boston and was under Jedediah's command from August 1775 to December 1775. He kept a diary outlining his activities, including several visits to graveyards in Roxbury and the Old Village Cemetery. He had a son, Cordilla, who was encamped with him during the war. During his first visit to Dedham, on his way to Roxbury, he stayed at the Woodward Tavern.)

The local newspaper blamed the war, and the British, for her death: "The authors of American oppression and the whole public calamity are accountable for her death, and that of thousands more." (Note: One or more of the preceding sentences incorporates text from these sources, which are in the public domain: "General Huntington". National Park Service. August 9, 2019.; and "Faith Trumbull Huntington". National Park Service. March 20, 2023.)

== Works cited ==
- Parr, James L. (2009). Dedham: Historic and Heroic Tales From Shiretown. The History Press. ISBN 978-1-59629-750-0.
- Warren, Charles (1931). Jacobin and Junto: Or, Early American Politics as Viewed in the Diary of Dr. Nathaniel Ames, 1758-1822. Harvard University Press.
