= Fisher Ames =

American politician (1758–1808)

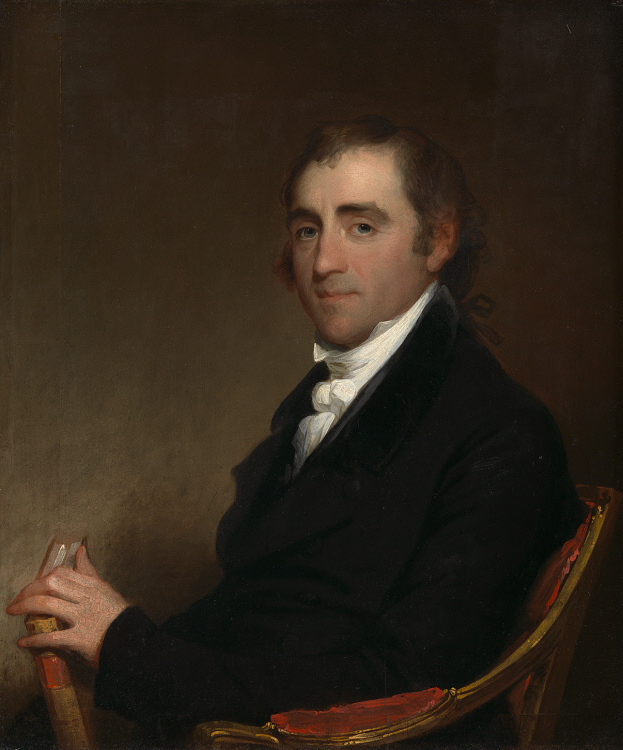
- portrait by Gilbert Stuart

Member of the U.S. House of Representatives from Massachusetts
- In office March 4, 1789 – March 3, 1797 Serving with Samuel Dexter, Benjamin Goodhue, and Samuel Holten (1793–1795)
- Preceded by: Congress of the Confederation
- Succeeded by: Harrison Gray Otis
- Constituency: 1st district (1789–1795); 8th district (1795–1797)

Member of the Massachusetts House of Representatives
- In office 1788

Personal details
- Born: April 9, 1758 Dedham, Massachusetts Bay, British America
- Died: July 4, 1808 (aged 50) Dedham, Massachusetts, United States of America
- Resting place: Old First Parish Cemetery, Dedham, Massachusetts
- Party: Federalist
- Relatives: Ames family
- Education: Harvard University
- Profession: Lawyer

Fisher Ames (/eɪmz/; April 9, 1758 – July 4, 1808) was a Representative in the United States Congress from the 1st Congressional District of Massachusetts. He became conspicuous in promoting the new Constitution during his state's ratifying convention, which propelled him to election to the United States Congress for four terms concurrent with the Washington Administration. In this role, he was an important leader of the Federalist Party in the House of Representatives and soon became famous for his powerful skill as an orator. Ames was on the committee that inaugurated President Washington, he framed the final accepted wording in the First Amendment regarding freedom of religion in 1789 and fought many key legislative battles successfully for the Federalists in Congress. In his day, his greatest performance was a defense of the Jay Treaty in 1796, which secured enough votes to pass the appropriation for the treaty. Ames's Jay Treaty oration was known for decades afterward and set a standard for later statesman in debate and oratory to follow well into the 19th century. Ames left Congress in 1797, due to declining health, and continued to be a Federalist essayist for a decade after his Congressional career. Ames died on July 4, 1808, at the age of fifty; making him the first of three Founding Fathers who died on July 4—along with Thomas Jefferson and John Adams, who both died in 1826.

== Personal life ==
Ames was born in Dedham in the Province of Massachusetts Bay. His father, Nathaniel Ames, died when Fisher was but six years old, but his mother, Deborah Fisher, resolved, in spite of her limited income, to give the boy a classical education. He belonged to one of the oldest families in Massachusetts and in his line of his ancestry was William Ames. At the age of six he began the study of Latin, and at the age of twelve, he was sent to Harvard College, graduating in 1774 when he began work as a teacher. While teaching school Ames also studied law in the office of William Tudor. In 1779 he was received as a law pupil in a Boston law firm, and in 1781 was admitted to the Suffolk bar. and commenced his law practice in Dedham that same year. Ames was not very fond of law but practiced it successfully.

He had a brother, also named Nathaniel Ames. The brothers had opposite political views and social styles. Nathaniel "enjoyed his role as country doctor, servant of the proletariat, and champion of the common man." He became the leader of the Democratic-Republican Party in Dedham. He was most at home around the farmers and laborers with whom he grew up. Fisher, on the other hand, liked to dress well, hobnob with Boston society, and was an influential Federalist. Fisher operated his law practice out of the first floor of the Ames Tavern.

He was elected a Fellow of the American Academy of Arts and Sciences in 1793. Ames had six children, including John, Seth, Nathaniel, and William (Note: William was a resident at the Phoenix Hotel and was known to be quiet but charitable. He died at the hotel in Springfield, Massachusetts where he was living.) with his wife, Frances. Ames owned a farm on Federal Hill in Dedham that he rented out. If the weather was fair while he was home from Washington, he would walk to the farm every day to inspect the crops growing there.

== Political career ==
=== Massachusetts ===
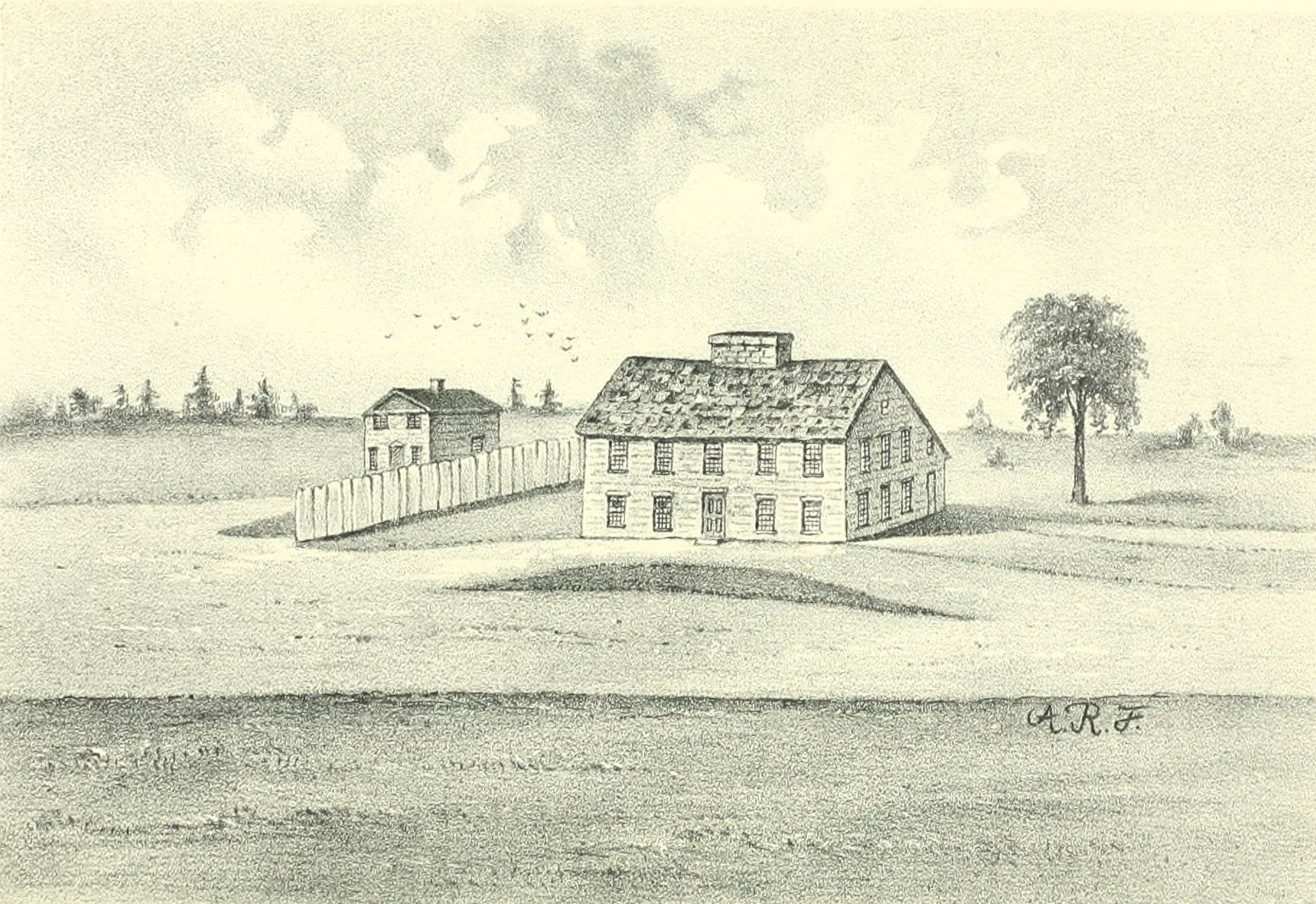
The Ames Tavern

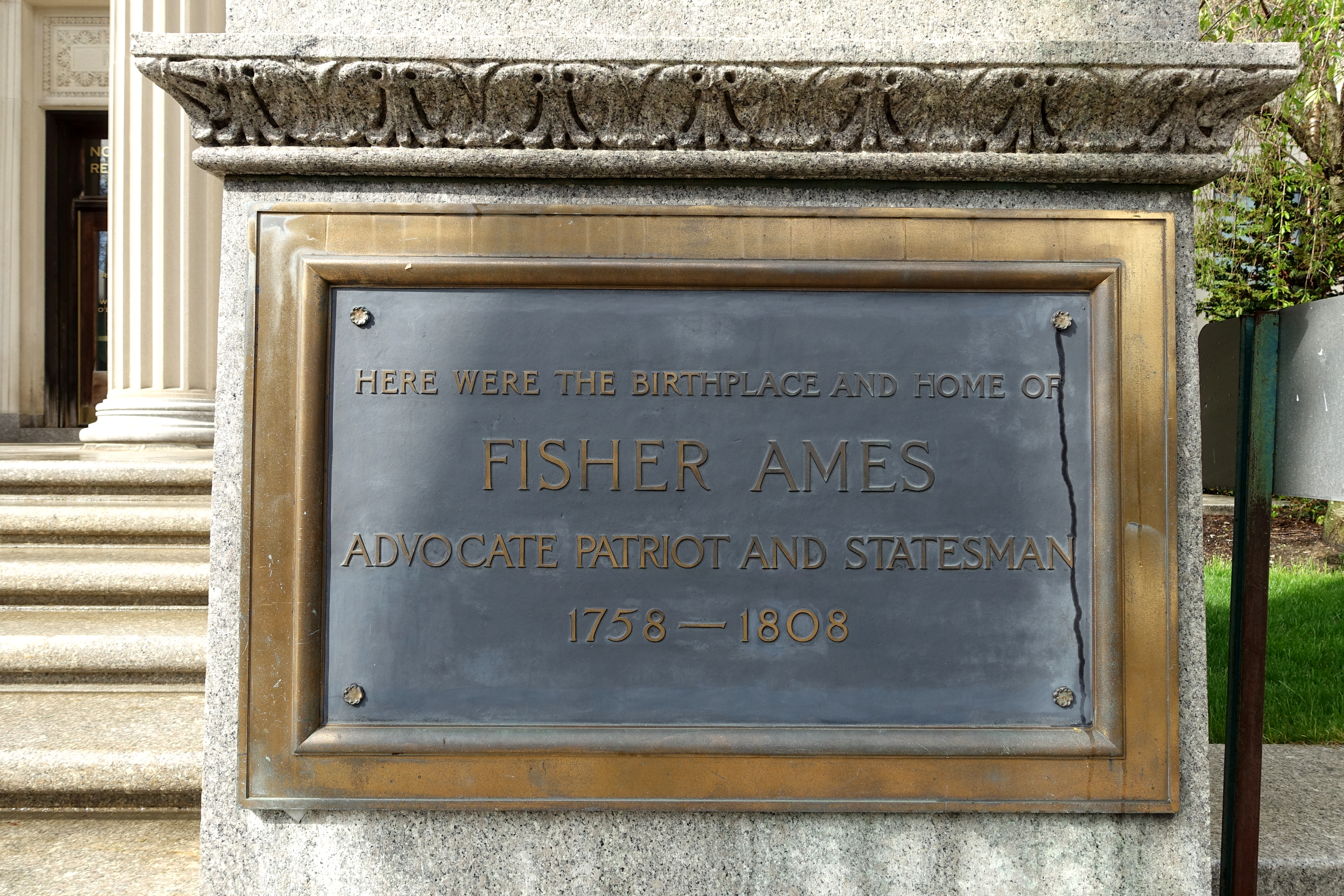
Plaque on the Norfolk County Registry of Deeds

In 1788, he became a member of the Massachusetts convention that ratified the United States Constitution. His "lucid and persuasive" speeches in the convention helped to sway enough votes to adopt the Constitution. Later that year, he was elected to serve in the Massachusetts House of Representatives alongside Nathaniel Kingsbury.

After stepping down from Congress, he stayed in politics and was a member of the Governor's Council from 1798 to 1800. In his new role, Ames offered one of the great orations on the death of President Washington.

=== Federal ===
Ames was elected to the First United States Congress, having beaten Samuel Adams for the post. He was surprised by his win. He was a member of the Federalist Party, specifically its Essex Junto. When Ames reported to Congress in late March 1789, he was assigned to the standing committee of Congressman who would plan and execute the inauguration of President George Washington. Ames said: "When I saw Washington, I felt strong emotions. I believe that no man ever had so fair a claim to veneration as he." Later, on Inauguration Day, he sat in the same pew at St. Paul's Church, New York, for the Christian service after the inauguration, and more famously said: "Time has made havoc upon his face."

Ames also served in the Second and Third Congresses and as a Federalist to the Fourth Congress. He served in Congress from March 4, 1789, to March 3, 1797. During the First Congress, he was chairman of the Committee on Elections. In 1796, he was not a candidate for renomination but resumed the practice of law in Dedham.

Though he was young, he was considered one of the best orators in the Congress. Ames offered one of the first great speeches in American Congressional history when he spoke in favor of the Jay Treaty. Ames vigorously defended the interests of New England, such as opposing a tax on molasses. Despite his Federalist sympathies, Ames would dissent from his party when he felt it was not in the country's best interest. For example, in 1789 Ames argued against the appointment of Thomas Willing as the President of Hamilton's newly created Bank of the United States.

In 1794, the people of Charleston, South Carolina burned him in effigy alongside William Pitt, Benedict Arnold, and the Devil for his pro-British positions.

=== Political opinions ===
Ames became concerned by the rising popularity of Jefferson's Republicans, who advocated the United States adopt Republican type representative government along the lines of post-Revolution government in France. Hamilton's Federalists (of which Ames was one), although they too agreed with a Republic, advocated a stronger federal government with similar powers to the British example. Ames felt Federalism around a clear and firm constitution was the model the United States should follow to prevent the fledgling nation from failing. He cautioned against the excesses of democracy unfettered by morals and reason: "Popular reason does not always know how to act right, nor does it always act right when it knows." He also felt that democracy alone was too fragile a system to resist descent into tyranny. "A democracy cannot last. Its nature ordains that its next change should be into a military despotism....The reason is that the tyranny of what is called the people, and that by the sword, both operate alike to debase and corrupt, til there are neither men left with the spirit to desire liberty, nor morals with the power to sustain justice. Like the burning pestilence that destroys the human body, nothing can subsist by its dissolution but vermin." Likewise, Ames warned his countrymen of the dangers of flattering demagogues, who incite dis-union and lead their country into bondage: "Our country is too big for union, too sordid for patriotism, too democratic for liberty. What is to become of it, He who made it best knows. Its vice will govern it, by practising upon its folly. This is ordained for democracies."

Ames shared John Adams' estimation of the French Revolution and held great skepticism and disdain for the excesses that were occurring across France, fearing it could have a detrimental effect on American politics given the recent alliance between France and the United States during the American Revolution.

=== Framer of the Religious Freedom portion of the 1st Amendment ===
From June to August 1789, the First Congress worked on the Bill of Rights. Fisher Ames listened to his colleagues' suggestions as they were brought to the floor in the discussions regarding how they should codify preventing a type of national church, such as Church of England, as well as enshrine freedom of religion, and near the end of the summer, on August 20, 1789 motioned his suggestion: "Congress shall make no law establishing religion, or to prevent the free exercise thereof, or infringe the rights of conscience." This wording the House members were satisfied, and it was passed to the Senate along with all other amendments. The Senate would make a number of changes to Ames's wording, but after a few weeks, realized what Ames wrote was the arrangement all had sought, and the final version that became the part of the 1st Amendment regarding religious freedom read: "Congress shall make no law respecting the establishment of religion, or prohibiting a free exercise thereof; ...."

=== Views on slavery ===
Fisher Ames wrote in one letter of 1790: "I am no advocate of slavery," but there are no other known statements by him that establish if he was for abolition of slavery or even against it. It is well documented in his other correspondences and primary sources that verify his parents owned slaves and also the family of his wife were slave owners. However, Fisher Ames himself never purchased a slave, sold one, or was in a position to free one. As a Congressman, Ames voiced irritation over wasting time on slavery issues in the Congress, and felt it was an issue for the states, not the federal government to deal with. Ames did vote in the affirmative for the first Fugitive Slave Act, but outside of scant mention of slavery by Fisher Ames in his correspondence between 1789-1808, they are not sufficient to fully establish a strong view on the issue one way or another. Most likely, his position on the institution of slavery was that he himself had no desire to own slaves, but did not think abolition was possible, and like most people of his time tacitly accepted it as a part of the world men lived in.

== Later years ==
In the late 18th century, Massachusetts was a solidly Federalist state. Dedham, however, was divided between Federalists and Republicans.

Ames returned home to Dedham in 1797. (Note: His estate was later owned by John Gardner and his "aristocratic" family who did not socialize much with others in town.) Upon returning, he was alarmed by the growing number of Republicans in town, led by his brother Nathaniel, who lived next door. In 1798, he hosted a Fourth of July party for 60 residents that was complete with patriotic songs and speeches. The attendees wrote a complimentary letter to President John Adams, pledging their support should the new nation go to war with France. Referring to the XYZ Affair, they wanted France to know that "we bear no foreign yoke--we will pay no tribute."

Nathaniel Ames wrote in his diary that his brother had convinced "a few deluded people" into signing the letter by "squeezing teazing greazing" them with food and drink. Despite his brother the Congressman's efforts, Nathaniel believed that "the Great Mass of People" in the town were with the Republicans. For his part, Fisher wrote to Secretary of State Timothy Pickering after the party that "the progress of right opinions" was winning out in Dedham over "perhaps the most malevolent spirit that exists," the Republican Party. Members of the Federalist elite continued to visit him at his Dedham home, including Alexander Hamilton on June 24, 1800.

Ames supported calling Joshua Bates as minister of the First Church and Parish in Dedham, but later left that church and became an Episcopalian.

While attending a Town Meeting in Dedham, he rose to speak and delivered one of his "oratorical gems." A laborer rose to speak after him and said "Mr. Moderator, my brother Ames' eloquence reminds me of nothing but the shining of a firefly, which gives just enough light to show its own insignificance." He then immediately sat down.

In 1805, Ames was chosen president of Harvard University. He declined to serve because of failing health. Ames died on July 4, 1808. Nathaniel had arranged for a funeral in Dedham and had sent details to a printer to be published. George Cabot sent an employee to speak to Ames' widow about hosting the funeral in his home. The widow agreed. Nathaniel believed Cabot's intentions were to embarrass the Town of Dedham for its Republican political views and did not attend. Ames was interred in the Old Village Cemetery.

== Legacy ==
He is the namesake of Ames Christian University. The Ames Schoolhouse, now Dedham's Town Hall, was named for him. Ames Street is named for him and his family.

Despite his limited number of years in public service, Fisher Ames ranks as one of the more influential figures of his era. Ames led Federalist ranks in the House of Representatives. His acceptance of the Bill of Rights garnered support in Massachusetts for the new Constitution. His greatest fame however may have come as an orator, for which one historian has dubbed him "the most eloquent of the Federalists."

== Writings ==
Ames got his start in politics by writing essays in the local press under the pen names of Camillus and Lucius Junius Brutus. doing so gave him a level of notoriety beyond the confines of Dedham. He also published a number of essays, critical of Jefferson's followers.

== See also ==
- Ames family

== Works cited ==
- Austin, Walter (1912). Tale of a Dedham Tavern: History of the Norfolk Hotel, Dedham, Massachusetts. Priv. print. at the Riverside Press.
- Clarke, Wm. Horatio (1903). Mid-Century Memories of Dedham. Dedham Historical Society.
- Hanson, Robert Brand (1976). Dedham, Massachusetts, 1635-1890. Dedham Historical Society.
- Slack, Charles (2015). Liberty's First Crisis: Adams, Jefferson, and the Misfits Who Saved Free Speech. Atlantic Monthly Press. ISBN 978-0802123428.
- Hurd, Duane Hamilton (1884). History of Norfolk County, Massachusetts: With Biographical Sketches of Many of Its Pioneers and Prominent Men. J. W. Lewis & Company.
- Knudsen, Harold M. (2025). Fisher Ames, Christian Founding Father & Federalist. Liberty Hill Publishing.
- Morison, Samuel Eliot (1932). Dumas Malone (ed.). Dictionary of American biography. Vol. I. New York: Charles Scribner's Sons.
- Smith, Frank (1936). A History of Dedham, Massachusetts. Transcript Press, Incorporated.
- Worthington, Erastus (1827). The history of Dedham: from the beginning of its settlement, in September 1635, to May 1827. Dutton and Wentworth.

U.S. House of Representatives
New district	Member of the U.S. House of Representatives from Massachusetts's 1st congressional district March 4, 1789 – March 4, 1795 alongside on a General ticket (1793–1795): Samuel Dexter, Benjamin Goodhue, Samuel Holten	Succeeded by Theodore Sedgwick
New district	Member of the U.S. House of Representatives from Massachusetts's 8th congressional district March 4, 1795 – March 4, 1797	Succeeded by Harrison Gray Otis
