= Nathaniel Ames (born 1741) =

American politician

- Born: October 9, 1741
- Died: July 20, 1822 (aged 80)

Nathaniel Ames (October 9, 1741 – July 20, 1822) was an American medical doctor, politician, and teacher. He represented Dedham, Massachusetts in the Massachusetts Great and General Court. Ames Street in Dedham is named for him and his family.

== Personal life ==
=== Early life and conflict with Fisher Ames ===
Ames was born on October 9, 1741, to Dr. Nathaniel Ames and Deborah Ames. His brother was Fisher Ames. Nathaniel had diametrically opposite political views from Fisher, and very different social styles as well. Nathaniel "enjoyed his role as country doctor, servant of the proletariat, and champion of the common man." He became the leader of the Democratic-Republican Party in Dedham. He was most at home around the farmers and laborers with whom he grew up. Fisher, on the other hand, liked to dress well, hobnob with the Boston Brahim, and was an influential Federalist. Fisher operated his law practice out of the first floor of the Ames Tavern. Nathaniel believed the two greatest threats to America were "pettifoggers," a derogatory term he used to describe lawyers, and "Fudderalists."

Ames was the administrator of his father's estate. However, 23 years after his death, Ames still had not made a settlement among the heirs. Fisher increased his protests until Ames finally settled their father's affairs, though he never forgave his family for rushing him. As with just about everything he did in life, Fisher's death on July 4, 1808, was an annoyance to his brother Nathaniel. Nathaniel had arranged for a funeral in Dedham and had sent details to a printer to be published. George Cabot sent an employee to speak to Fisher's widow about hosting the funeral in his home. The widow agreed. Nathaniel believed Cabot's intentions were to embarrass the Town of Dedham for its Republican political views and did not attend.

=== Marriage ===
On March 13, 1775, Ames was married to Melitiah Shuttleworth (Note: Melitiah was the sister of Jeremiah Shuttleworth.) by Rev. William Clark on March 13, 1775, but it was not a happy marriage. In his diary, he wrote that some of the best advice he ever got was "Of all the foolish things you do, let marriage be the last". According to his diary entry, he had also "discovered worse malignancy in my bosom friend that I conceived it possible to dwell in human shape." His wife forbid him from frequenting taverns, depriving him of both social and business contacts.

The couple took in Melitiah's niece, Hannah Shuttleworth, when the girl was 16 years old. When Ames died in 1822, he left his fortune to his wife and, upon her death, to the unmarried Hannah, his closest living relative.

=== Reputation ===
Ames became known around Dedham as "Grumbleton the Jacobinite." The list of people and groups he disliked was long, and his prejudices were extreme. He would also frequently create caricature names for them, such as "Prigarchy" for John Adams, lawyers in general, anything British, and Federalists.

=== Education at Harvard ===
Ames later attended Harvard College, graduating in 1761. He went on to earn a second degree at Harvard. There, he would make connections with a number of individuals who would serve in the American Revolution and in the new American government.

=== Diary ===
For most of his life, Ames kept a diary. Beginning while at Harvard and ending just before his death, its entries spanned a period of 64 years. (Note: The originals are now held by the Dedham Historical Society and were published in 1998 by Dedham historian Robert Hanson.) He recorded his actions and thoughts on both local and national events, but he largely stopped writing about national affairs after the end of the War of 1812.

== Career ==
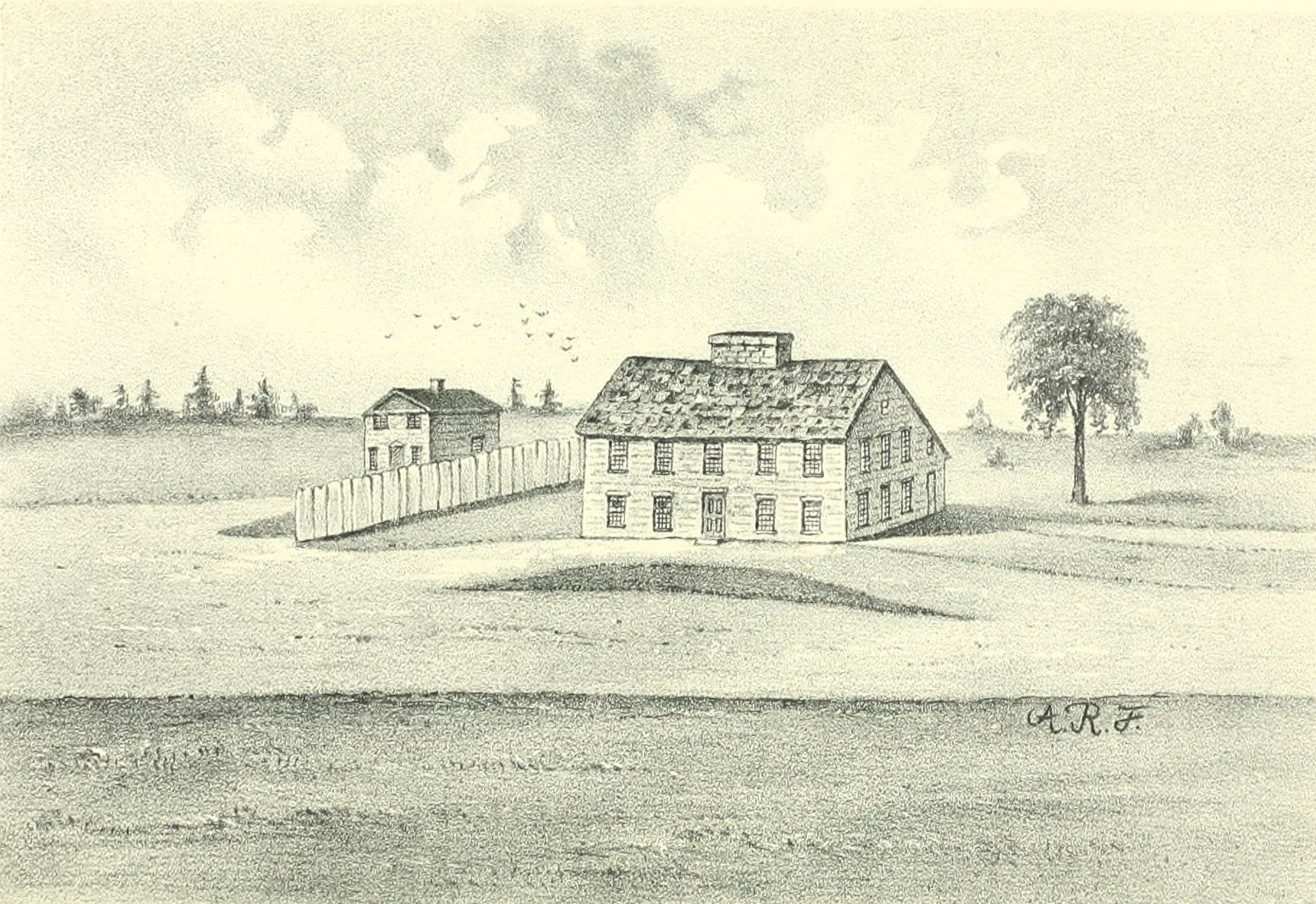
Ames tavern

The town of Dedham first elected Ames to the Great and General Court in 1790, but he refused the office. The following year he was elected again and accepted "upon [the town's] acceptance to dispense with my attendance... I consider myself as a nominal Representative only to save the Town from being fined".

Following his father's death, Ames took on his medical practice and his almanac publishing business. He also taught classes in the Dedham Public Schools and in Needham, Massachusetts.

After Norfolk County was created in 1792, the Court of Common Pleas and the Court of General Sessions of the Peace first met in Dedham's meetinghouse. Ames was chosen as the clerk of both courts; they met for the first time on September 23. (Note: Hanson is not clear in which year they first met.) He was removed from both positions in August 1797 by the new Federalist administration. Ames saw political revenge as the reason for the sacking, but those responsible claimed that he had "so interlarded the books with ebullitions of spleen, nonsense, and blackguardism, that it became necessary, for the preservation of the records, to remove him.

In 1793, he was upset that Samuel Haven was selected to be register of probate over him, and claimed it was only through the "solicitation, lying, and intrigue" of Haven's father, Rev. Jason Haven, that he got the position. Like his father before him, Ames frequently feuded with the elder Haven.

=== Revolutionary war ===
After the Battles of Lexington and Concord, Ames tended to the wounded. One patient was Israel Everett, from whose arm he removed a musket ball.

== See also ==
- Ames family
- Dedham Liberty Pole

== Works cited ==
- Austin, Walter (1912). Tale of a Dedham Tavern: History of the Norfolk Hotel, Dedham, Massachusetts. Priv. print. at the Riverside Press.
- Hanson, Robert Brand (1976). Dedham, Massachusetts, 1635-1890. Dedham Historical Society.
- Parr, James L. (2009). Dedham: Historic and Heroic Tales From Shiretown. The History Press. ISBN 978-1-59629-750-0.
- Warren, Charles (1931). Jacobin and Junto: Or, Early American Politics as Viewed in the Diary of Dr. Nathaniel Ames, 1758-1822. Harvard University Press.
- Worthington, Erastus (1827). The History of Dedham: From the Beginning of Its Settlement, in September 1635, to May 1827. Dutton and Wentworth. p. 1.
