= Suffolk Resolves =

Massachusetts revolutionary declaration

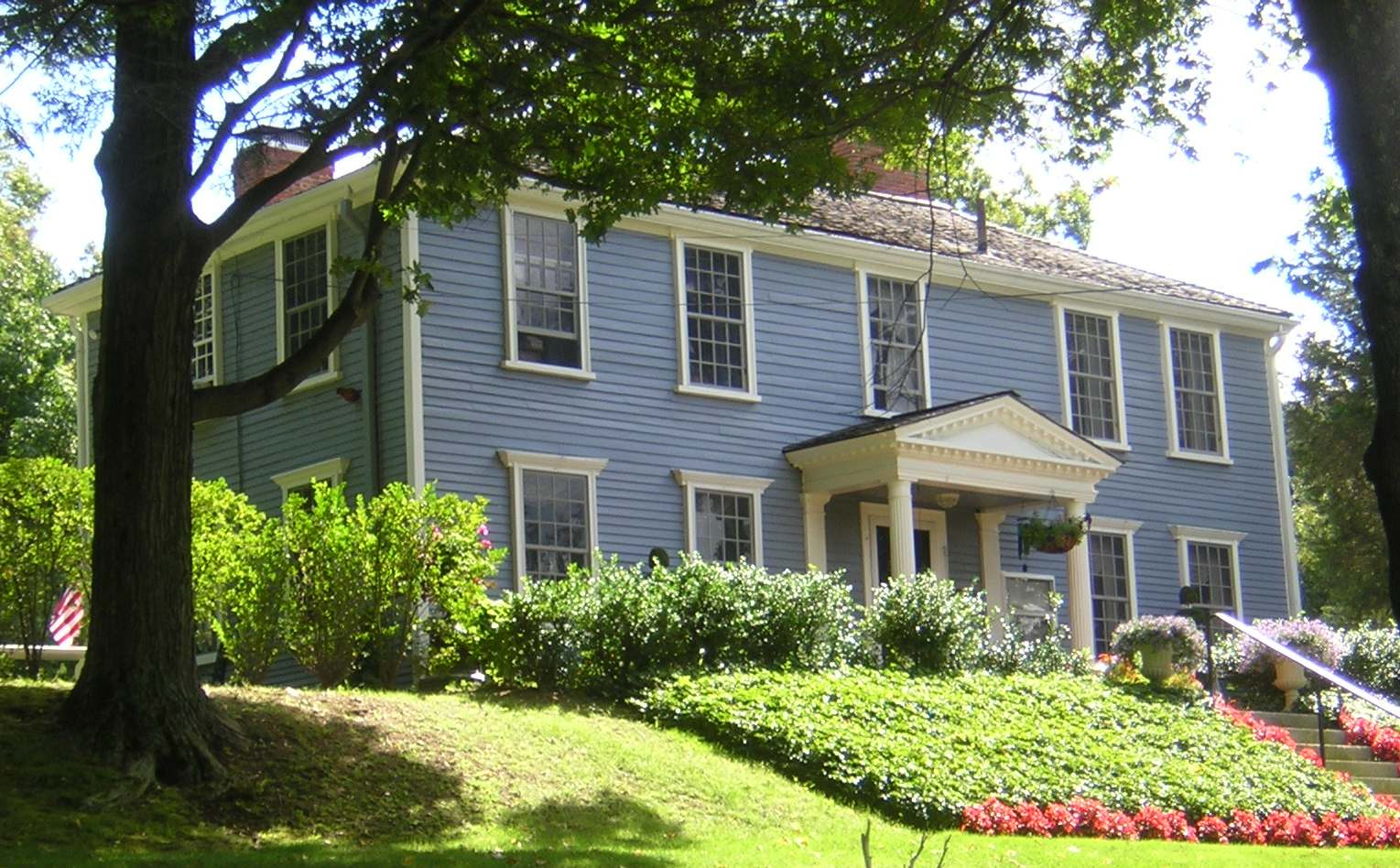
- The Suffolk Resolves House, 2009
- Created: September 6, 1774
- Presented: September 9, 1774
- Commissioned by: Suffolk Committee of correspondence
- Author: Joseph Warren
- Subject: Political crisis in Massachusetts Bay
- Purpose: Protestation of the Intolerable Acts

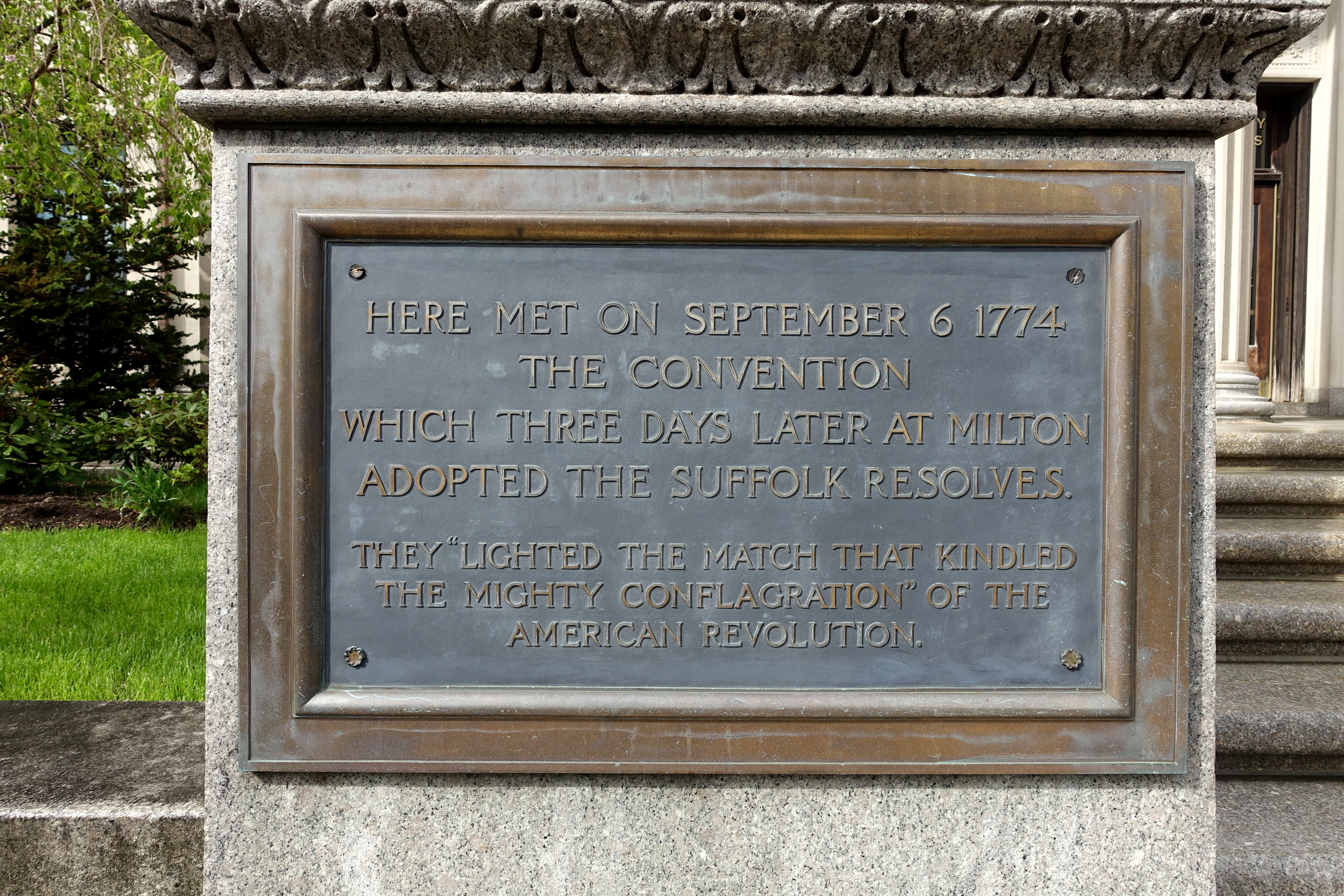
Tablet on the Norfolk County Registry of Deeds

The Suffolk Resolves was a declaration made on September 9, 1774, by the leaders of Suffolk County, Massachusetts. The declaration rejected the Massachusetts Government Act and resulted in a boycott of imported goods from Britain unless the Intolerable Acts were repealed. The Resolves were recognized by statesman Edmund Burke as a major development in colonial animosity leading to adoption of the United States Declaration of Independence from the Kingdom of Great Britain in 1776, and he urged British conciliation with the American colonies, to little effect. The First Continental Congress endorsed the Resolves on September 17, 1774, and passed the similarly themed Continental Association on October 20, 1774.

== History ==
On August 26–27, 1774 the Committees of Correspondence from Suffolk, Middlesex, Essex, and Worcester counties met at Faneuil Hall in Boston to oppose the recent Massachusetts Government Act, which had disenfranchised citizens of Massachusetts by revoking key provisions of the provincial Charter of 1691. The convention urged all Massachusetts counties to close their courts, rather than to submit to the oppressive measure. Berkshire had already done so, and by the first week of October, seven of the nine contiguous mainland counties in Massachusetts had followed suit.

As each county in turn closed its court, it issued a set of resolves to explain its actions. Although the resolves were all similar in tone and scope, the one written by patriots in Suffolk has received more attention for two reasons: it was better crafted, and it was formally endorsed by the Continental Congress. Suffolk, which contained Boston, was the only county in which courts remained nominally open, under the protection of all British troops.

At the Suffolk County Convention of the Committees of Correspondence on September 6, 1774, Joseph Warren introduced the first draft of the Suffolk Resolves, which were edited and approved three days later at the Daniel Vose House in Milton, Massachusetts, which was then part of Suffolk County but is now in Norfolk County, Massachusetts. The convention that adopted them had first met at the Woodward Tavern in Dedham, which is now the site of the Norfolk County Registry of Deeds. As with the other counties' resolves, the Suffolk document denounced the Intolerable Acts, or Coercive Acts, which had recently been passed by the British Parliament and specifically resolved the following:

1. boycott British imports, curtail exports, and refuse to use British products;
2. pay "no obedience" to the Massachusetts Government Act or the Boston Port Bill;
3. demand resignations from those appointed to positions under the Massachusetts Government Act;
4. refuse payment of taxes until the Massachusetts Government Act was repealed;
5. support a colonial government in Massachusetts free of royal authority until the Intolerable Acts were repealed;
6. urge the colonies to raise militia of their own people.

Following the issuance of the Resolves, Paul Revere delivered a copy to the First Continental Congress in Philadelphia, Pennsylvania, where it was endorsed on September 17 as a show of colonial solidarity. In response, John Adams commented in his diary: "This was one of the happiest days of my life. In Congress we had generous, noble sentiments, and manly eloquence. This day convinced me that America will support Massachusetts or perish with her."

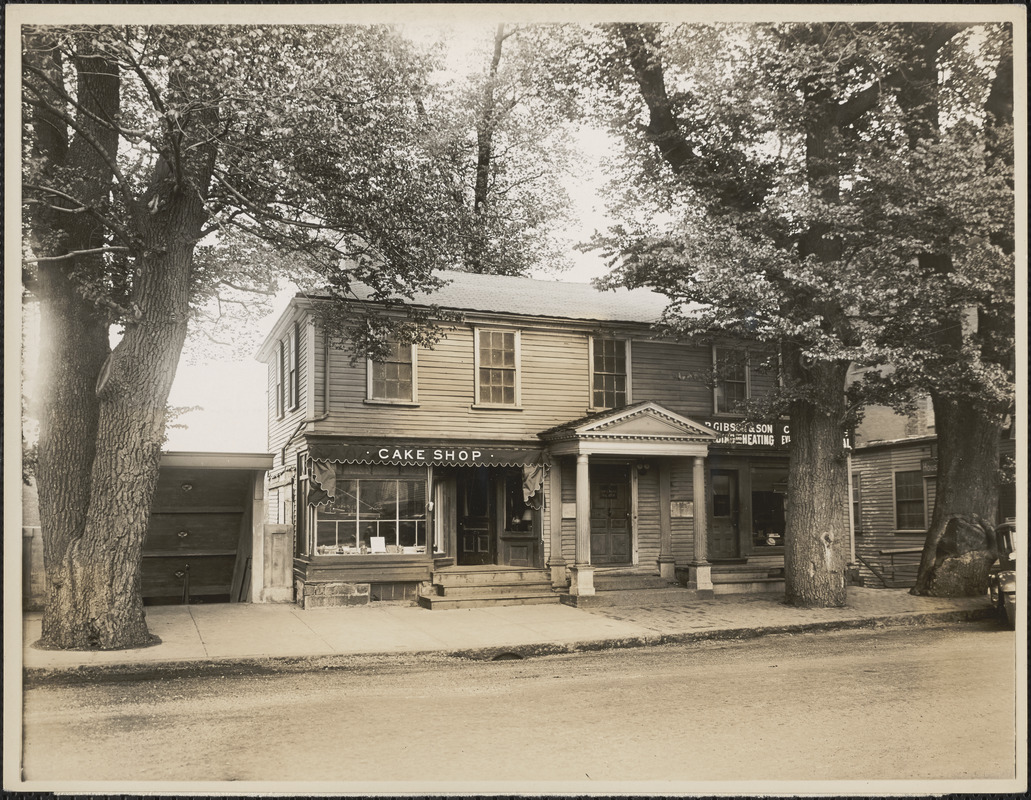
The "Suffolk Resolves" house in 1930

Endorsement of the Suffolk Resolves and, with it the rebellion that had enveloped Massachusetts, altered the political balance in Congress and paved the way for other radical measures, such as the Continental Association, a general nonimportation agreement adopted by the First Continental Association a month later, on October 20. Previously, nonimportation agreements had been limited to specific localities, but this one applied throughout the rebellious colonies. The Committees of Safety (or Correspondence), which were formed to enforce the Continental Association, established a revolutionary infrastructure, similar to that of the Sons of Liberty during the early days of the resistance.

A number of counties in other colonies adopted declarations of grievances against Britain before the Declaration of Independence, including the Mecklenburg Resolves and the Tryon Resolves in 1775 and at least 90 other documents favoring independence in the spring of 1776, but the resolves from the Massachusetts County Conventions in August–October 1774 were the first to promote across-the-board noncompliance with British governmental authority.

== Commemoration ==
A historic plaque on Adams Street in the Lower Mills area of Milton commemorates the original site of the Daniel Vose House, where the Suffolk Resolves were signed on September 4, 1774. In order to prevent its demolition, the house was moved in 1950 from Lower Mills to 1370 Canton Avenue in Milton. Now known as the Suffolk Resolves House, it was restored to its original colonial appearance and is the headquarters of the Milton Historical Society. It was added to the National Register of Historic Places in 1973 and is open to public view.

== General and cited references ==
- Adams, John (1961). Butterfield, Lyman Henry (ed.). Diary and autobiography of John Adams. Vol. II. Cambridge, Mass. : Belknap Press of Harvard University Press. ISBN 978-0-6897-00316.
