= O'Brien-class destroyer =

Destroyer class of the US Navy

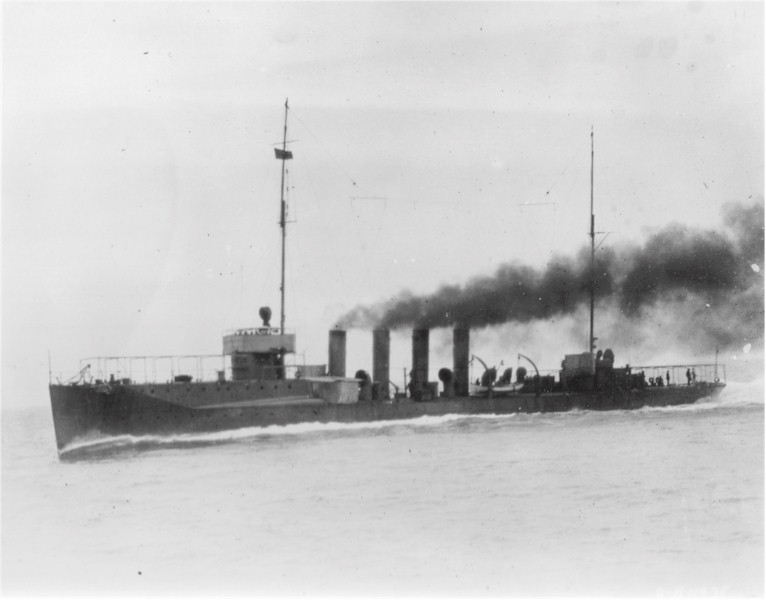
- Lead ship of the O'Brien class, USS O'Brien

Class overview
- Name: O'Brien class
- Builders: Bath Iron Works (1); Fore River Shipbuilding Company (1); New York Shipbuilding Corporation (1); William Cramp & Sons (3)
- Operators: United States Navy; United States Coast Guard
- Preceded by: Aylwin class
- Succeeded by: Tucker class
- Built: 1913–1915
- In commission: U.S. Navy: 1915–1922; U.S. Coast Guard: 1924–1933
- Planned: 6
- Completed: 6
- Retired: 6
- Scrapped: 6

General characteristics
- Type: destroyer
- Displacement: 1,050 long tons (1,070 t) (normal); 1,171 long tons (1,190 t) (full)
- Length: 305 ft 5 in (93.09 m) (oa)
- Beam: 31 ft 2 in (9.50 m)
- Draft: 9 ft 6 in (2.90 m) (normal); 10 ft 7 in (3.23 m) (max)
- Propulsion: 4 × White-Forster boilers, 2 × direct drive Zoelly steam turbines, 2 × triple-expansion steam engines for cruising [DD-55: 2 × geared steam turbines]; 2 × shafts; 17,000 shp (13,000 kW)
- Speed: 29 knots (54 km/h)
- Complement: 101
- Armament: 4 × 4 in (102 mm)/50-caliber guns; 8 × 21-inch (533 mm) torpedo tubes (4 × 2), 8 torpedoes

The O'Brien class of destroyers was a class of six ships designed by and built for the United States Navy shortly before the United States entered World War I. The O'Brien class was the third of five classes of destroyers that were known as the "thousand tonners", because they were the first U.S. destroyers over 1,000 long tons (1,016 t) displacement.

The design of what became the O'Brien class was the result of discussions between the General Board of the United States Navy and the U.S. Navy's Bureau of Ordnance. What resulted was a design that was an incremental development of the Aylwin class, which itself was similar to the first of the thousand tonners, the Cassin class (which displaced about a third more than the preceding Paulding class). The key difference in the O'Brien class was the increase in torpedo size, going up to 21 inches (533 mm) from the preceding classes' 18-inch (457 mm) torpedoes.

The ships had a median displacement of 1,050 long tons (1,070 t), were just over 305 feet (93 m) in length, and had a beam of about 31 feet (9.4 m). All of the ships had two direct-drive steam turbines and a combination of other engines for cruising at speeds less than 15 knots (28 km/h). All of the ships were designed for a maximum speed of 29 knots (54 km/h). As built, they were armed with four 4-inch (102 mm) guns and had four twin 21-inch torpedo tubes with a load of eight torpedoes, but all were later equipped with depth charges. The ships were built by four private American shipyards—Bath Iron Works, Fore River Shipbuilding Company, New York Shipbuilding Corporation, and William Cramp & Sons—and were laid down between September and November 1913; launched between April 1914 and February 1915; and commissioned into the U.S. Navy between June 1914 and August 1915.

All six ships operated in the Atlantic or Caribbean until the U.S. entrance into World War I in April 1917, when all six were sent overseas to Queenstown, Ireland, for convoy escort duties. Several of the ships rescued passengers and crew from ships sunk by U-boats, and several had encounters with U-boats themselves; Nicholson helped sink U-58 in November 1917, the first U-boat sunk by the U.S. Navy. All six members of the class had returned to the United States in January 1919 and were decommissioned by June 1922. In 1924, two of the six—Ericsson and McDougal—were commissioned into the United States Coast Guard to help enforce Prohibition as a part of the "Rum Patrol". They were returned to U.S. Navy custody in 1932 and 1933, respectively. All six ships had been sold for scrapping by June 1936.

== Background ==
For the 1913 fiscal year, the General Board of the United States Navy determined that six destroyers would be authorized. The design for Destroyers No. 51 through No. 56—what became the O'Brien class, was to closely follow the design of the Cassin and Aylwin classes from fiscal year 1912. The chief of the U.S. Navy's Bureau of Ordnance (BuOrd) suggested that the new destroyers be equipped with ten torpedo tubes and urged that the new 21-inch (533 mm) torpedo be adopted. The General Board agreed in principle, adopting the 21-inch torpedo tubes, but eliminated BuOrd's proposed centerline torpedo tubes and keeping the number of tubes at eight, the same as the Cassin and Aylwin classes. The additional weight of the larger torpedoes, 5 long tons (5.1 t) of top weight, was offset by reducing the planned two aft-facing guns to a single one. This gave the class four 4-inch (102 mm) guns, which, again, matched the battery of the Cassin and Aylwin classes. The design for the O'Brien class was approved on 20 August 1912, and authorized by Congress on 4 March 1913.

== Design ==
As built, the O'Brien-class ships were 305 feet 5 inches (93.09 m) in length (overall), were 31 feet 2 inches (9.50 m) abeam, and had a standard draft of 9 feet 6 inches (2.90 m). The hull shape featured the distinctive high forecastle typical of U.S. destroyer classes since the 1908–09 Smith class, the first destroyers designed to be truly ocean-going vessels. The ships displaced between 1,020 and 1,090 long tons (1,040 and 1,110 t) with a median of 1,050 long tons (1,070 t).

The ships were equipped with two propeller shafts and two direct-drive, Zoelly steam turbines fed by four White-Forster boilers. The power plant of the ships generated 17,000 shaft horsepower (13,000 kW) which drive the ships to the design speed of 29 knots (54 km/h). Because of inherent inefficiency of turbines at low speeds, (Note: While turbines were most efficient at high speeds, propellers were most efficient at low speeds. Turbines directly connected to the propeller shafts—as was the case with the main turbines of all the O'Brien ships—were particularly inefficient at low speeds. See: Friedman, pp. 25, 27.) all of the ships were equipped with supplemental cruising engines for travel at speeds under 15 knots (28 km/h). All except Cushing were equipped with supplemental triple-expansion reciprocating engines: O'Brien, Nicholson, and Winslow each had a pair of reciprocating engines for cruising; McDougal and Ericsson were outfitted with only one. Instead of reciprocating engines, Cushing was equipped with a pair of geared steam turbines for cruising.

The main battery of the O'Brien class consisted of four 4-inch (102 mm)/50 Mark 9 guns. (Note: The 50 denotes the length of the gun barrels; in this case, the gun is 50 calibers, meaning that the gun is 50 times as long as it is in diameter, 200 inches (5.1 m) in this case. The Mark number is the version of the gun; in this case, the ninth U.S. Navy design of the 4-inch/50 gun.) They were also equipped with four twin 21-inch (533 mm) torpedo tubes, for a total load of eight Mark 8 torpedoes. Although the General Board had called for two anti-aircraft guns for the O'Brien class, they were not originally outfitted with the weapons; the later Sampson class was the first American destroyer class so armed. Likewise, there is no record of any of the O'Brien ships being outfitted with mine-laying apparatus. During World War I, most American destroyers were used in anti-submarine warfare roles, and were equipped with depth charges and delivery systems, such as Y-guns and depth charge racks. O'Brien-class ships were equipped with depth charges during the war, but no specific mentions of the types of depth charges used or delivery system are recorded in secondary sources.

=== Comparisons with other "thousand tonners" ===
The "thousand tonners" were the 26 United States Navy destroyers of five classes—Cassin, Aylwin, O'Brien, Tucker, and Sampson—so named because they were the first U.S. Navy destroyers to have displacements greater than 1,000 long tons. (Note: The Aylwin class is considered a part of the Cassin class by Conway's All the World's Fighting Ships 1906–1921 (p. 122), but is classed separately by the United States Navy. See, for example, Naval History & Heritage Command. "Aylwin (Destroyer No. 47) ii". Dictionary of American Naval Fighting Ships. Navy Department, Naval History and Heritage Command.) The Cassin class, the first of the thousand tonners, displaced about a third more than the preceding Paulding class. The introduction of the thousand tonners led to the Pauldings and other older, smaller displacement destroyers of previous classes to be dismissively called "flivvers", a nickname also commonly applied to the Ford Model T. (Note: According to Cashman (p. 278), a flivver—a portmanteau of "for the liver"—was any small, inexpensive automobile that shook the liver while in motion.)

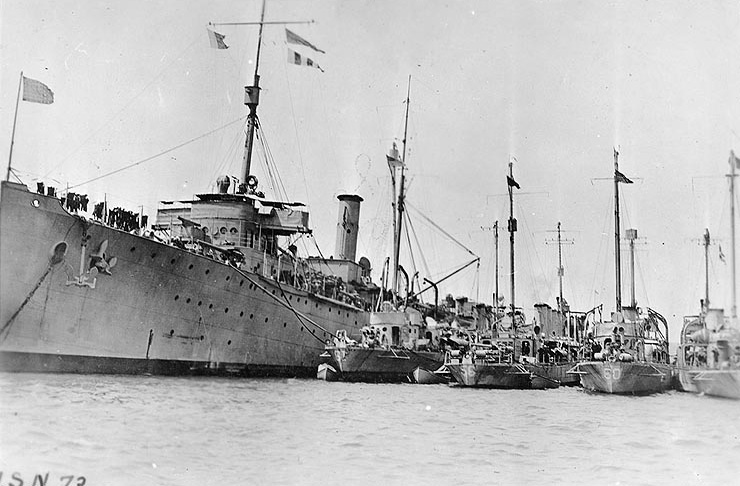
O'Brien class member Ericsson, between the closely related Tucker-class ships Jacob Jones (left) and Wadsworth, is moored by destroyer tender Melville at Queenstown, Ireland, in 1917.

The O'Brien class was the third of the five classes of "thousand tonners". The earlier Cassin- (DD-43 to DD-46) and Aylwin-class (DD-47 to DD-50) ships were about the same length as the O'Brien ships and all had median displacements in the range of 1,020–1,050 long tons (1,040–1,070 t); the later Tucker- (DD-57 to DD-62) and Sampson-class (DD-63 to DD-68) ships were about 10 feet (3.0 m) longer and had median displacements of 1,090–1,100 long tons (1,110–1,120 t). All five classes were armed with four 4-inch guns, but the torpedo size and complement varied. All were equipped with four twin torpedo tubes loaded with eight torpedoes except for the Sampsons (which had four triple tubes carrying twelve torpedoes), but the Cassin and Aylwin classes were armed with 18-inch (457 mm) torpedoes. The O'Brien ships were the first armed with the new 21-inch Mark 8 torpedoes; the Tucker and Sampson ships also used the 21-inch torpedoes. The Sampsons were the only group originally equipped with anti-aircraft guns, a pair of 1-pounder (0.45 kg) guns with a caliber of 37 mm (1.46 in).

== Construction ==
The construction of the six O'Brien-class ships was allocated to four U.S. shipbuilders. William Cramp constructed a trio of O'Brien destroyers, while the Fore River Shipbuilding Company, Bath Iron Works, and New York Shipbuilding Corporation built one ship each. The keels for all six ships were laid down between July and November 1913, with McDougal being the first and Ericsson the last. All were launched between April 1914 and January 1915, with McDougal again being the first and Winslow being the last. McDougal was commissioned in June 1914, two months after her launch; the rest were commissioned between April and August 1915, with Cushing the final ship to enter service. The cost of each ship for hull and machinery was $790,000. (Note: The hull-and-machinery cost does not include the costs of any weapons.)

== Ships in class ==
All six members of the class served in the Atlantic or Caribbean throughout their U.S. Navy careers. In October 1916, with the United States still neutral in World War I, five of the six class members (all except Nicholson) were among the U.S. destroyers sent out to rescue survivors from five ships torpedoed by the German submarine U-53 off the Lightship Nantucket.

After the United States entered the war in April 1917, all six class members were sent overseas to Queenstown, Ireland, for convoy escort and anti-submarine duties. McDougal was in the first group of six American destroyers that arrived at Queenstown on 4 May; Ericsson and Winslow followed in the second group, which arrived thirteen days later, and Cushing, Nicholson, and O'Brien in the third group, a week after that. Several of the ships had encounters with U-boats during the war: Nicholson, working with Fanning in November 1917, helped to sink U-58, which was the first U-boat sunk by the U.S. Navy; earlier, in June, O'Brien had depth-charged U-16 and was thought by the British Admiralty to have seriously damaged the U-boat, but post-war analysis of records showed that U-16 survived the attack and returned safely to port.

All six ships returned to the United States in January 1919 and served in various roles over the next two years. Cushing was decommissioned in August 1920, followed by Nicholson and McDougal in May 1922, and the remaining three in the following month. In June 1924, two of the six ships—Ericsson and McDougal—were reactivated for service with the United States Coast Guard's "Rum Patrol". Ericsson was returned to the U.S. Navy in May 1932, and McDougal in June 1933; both were sold for scrapping in 1934. O'Brien was sold for scrapping in 1935, and the remaining three in June 1936.

=== USS O'Brien (DD-51) ===
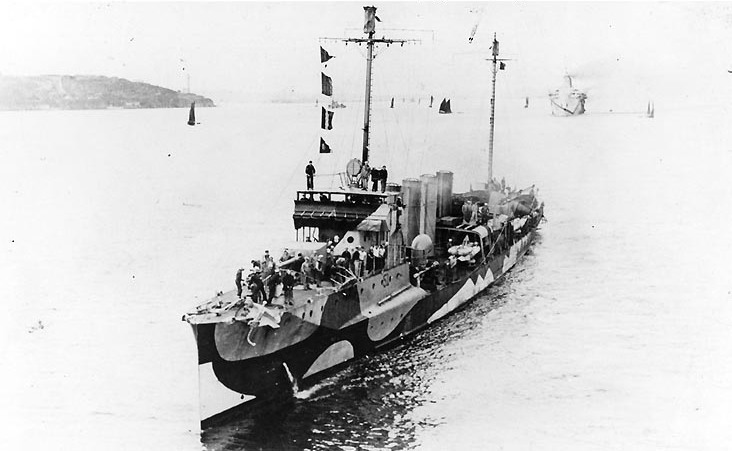
O'Brien, in dazzle camouflage, escorting a convoy in 1918

USS O'Brien (Destroyer No. 51/DD-51) was laid down by William Cramp & Sons of Philadelphia in September 1913 and launched in July 1914. The ship was the second U.S. Navy vessel named in honor of Jeremiah O'Brien and his five brothers, Gideon, John, William, Dennis, and Joseph who, together on the sloop Unity, captured a British warship during the American Revolutionary War.

After O'Brien's May 1915 commissioning, she sailed off the east coast and in the Caribbean. She was one of the U.S. destroyers sent out to rescue survivors from five victims of German submarine U-53 off the Lightship Nantucket in October 1916. After the United States entered World War I in April 1917, O'Brien was sent overseas to patrol the Irish Sea out of Queenstown, Ireland.

After returning to the United States in January 1919, O'Brien returned to European waters in May to serve as one of the picket ships for the NC-type seaplanes in the first aerial crossing of the Atlantic. O'Brien was decommissioned at Philadelphia in June 1922. She was struck from the Naval Vessel Register in March 1935 sold for scrapping in April.

=== USS Nicholson (DD-52) ===
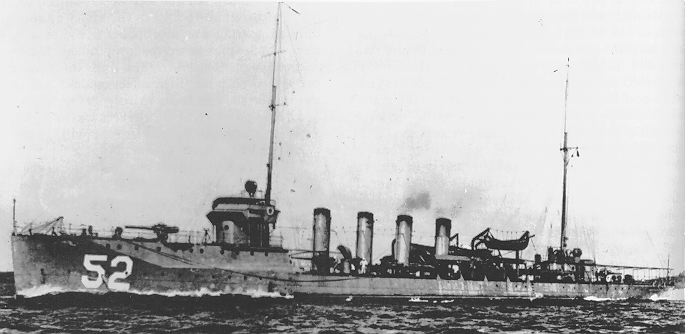
Nicholson

USS Nicholson (Destroyer No. 52/DD-52) was laid down by William Cramp & Sons of Philadelphia in September 1913 and launched in August 1914. The ship was the second U.S. Navy vessel named in honor of five members of the Nicholson family who gave distinguished service in the American Revolutionary War, the War of 1812, and the American Civil War: brothers James, Samuel, and John Nicholson; William Nicholson, son of John; and James W. Nicholson, grandson of Samuel.

After Nicholson's April 1915 commissioning, she sailed off the east coast and in the Caribbean. After the United States entered World War I in April 1917, Nicholson was sent overseas to patrol the Irish Sea out of Queenstown, Ireland. In October 1917, Nicholson steamed to the rescue of SS J. L. Luckenbach, driving off the German submarine U-62, which had shelled the American cargo ship for over three hours. In November, Nicholson and another U.S. destroyer, Fanning, were responsible for sinking the German submarine U-58, the first submarine taken by U.S. forces during the war. In September 1918, Nicholson helped drive off U-82 after that U-boat had torpedoed the American troopship Mount Vernon off the coast of France.

Upon returning to the United States after the war, Nicholson was placed in reduced commission in November 1919. She was decommissioned at Philadelphia in May 1922. She was struck from the Naval Vessel Register in January 1936 sold for scrapping in June.

=== USS Winslow (DD-53) ===
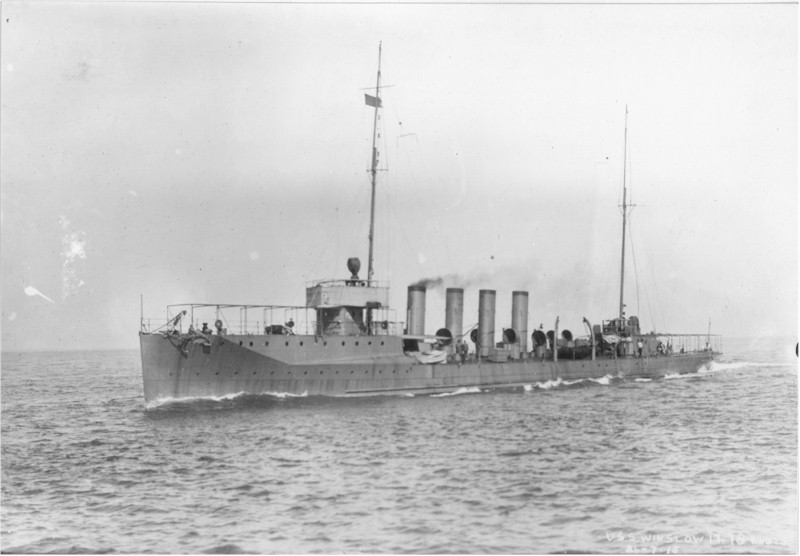
Winslow during trials in 1915

USS Winslow (Destroyer No. 53/DD-53) was laid down by William Cramp & Sons of Philadelphia in October 1913 and launched in February 1915. The ship was the second U.S. Navy vessel named in honor of John Ancrum Winslow, a U.S. Navy officer notable for sinking the Confederate commerce raider CSS Alabama during the American Civil War.

After Winslow's August 1915 commissioning, she sailed off the east coast and in the Caribbean. She was one of the U.S. destroyers sent out to rescue survivors from five victims of German submarine U-53 off the Lightship Nantucket in October 1916. After the United States entered World War I in April 1917, Winslow was sent overseas to patrol the Irish Sea out of Queenstown, Ireland. Winslow made several unsuccessful attacks on U-boats, and rescued survivors of several ships sunk by the German craft.

Upon returning to the United States after the war, Winslow was placed in reduced commission in December 1919. She was decommissioned at Philadelphia in June 1922. In November she dropped her name to free it for a new destroyer of the same name, becoming known only as DD-53. She was struck from the Naval Vessel Register in January 1936 sold for scrapping in June.

=== USS McDougal (DD-54) ===
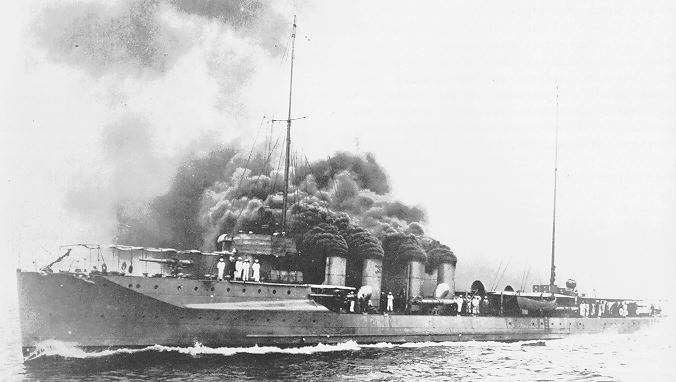
McDougal underway

USS McDougal (Destroyer No. 54/DD-54) was laid down by Bath Iron Works of Bath, Maine, in July 1913 and launched in April 1914. The ship was the second U.S. Navy vessel named in honor of David Stockton McDougal, a U.S. Navy officer notable for his leadership during an 1863 battle off Japan while in command of Wyoming.

After McDougal's June 1914 commissioning, she sailed off the east coast and in the Caribbean. She was one of the U.S. destroyers sent out to rescue survivors from five victims of German submarine U-53 off the Lightship Nantucket in October 1916, and carried 6 crewmen from a sunken Dutch cargo ship to Newport, Rhode Island. After the United States entered World War I in April 1917, McDougal was part of the first U.S. destroyer squadron sent overseas. Patrolling the Irish Sea out of Queenstown, Ireland, McDougal made several unsuccessful attacks on U-boats, and rescued survivors of ships sunk by the German craft. After a collision with a British cargo ship in February 1918, McDougal was under repair until mid-July, and afterwards, operated out of Brest, France.

Upon returning to the United States after the war, McDougal conducted operations with the destroyers of the Atlantic Fleet until August 1919, when she was placed in reserve, still in commission. After a brief stint of operations in mid 1921, she was placed in reserve until she was decommissioned at Philadelphia in May 1922. In June 1924, Ericsson was transferred to the United States Coast Guard to help enforce Prohibition as a part of the "Rum Patrol". She operated under the name USCGC McDougal (CG-6) until May 1933, when she was returned to the Navy. In November she dropped her name to free it for a new destroyer of the same name, becoming known only as DD-54. She was struck for the Naval Vessel Register in July 1934 sold for scrapping in August.

=== USS Cushing (DD-55) ===
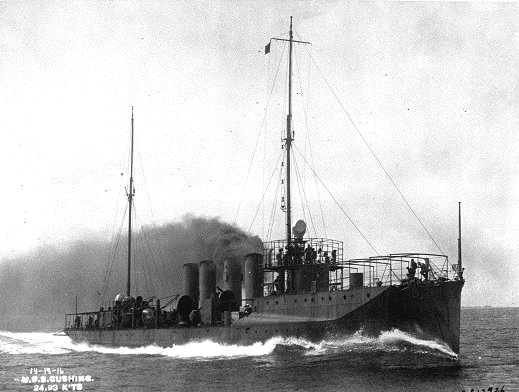
Cushing during trials in 1915

USS Cushing (Destroyer No. 55/DD-55) was laid down by the Fore River Shipbuilding Company of Quincy, Massachusetts, in September 1913 and launched in January 1915. The ship was the second U.S. Navy vessel named in honor of William B. Cushing, a U.S. Navy officer best known for sinking the Confederate ironclad warship CSS Albemarle during the American Civil War.

After Cushing's August 1915 commissioning, she sailed off the east coast and in the Caribbean. She was one of the U.S. destroyers sent out to rescue survivors from five victims of German submarine U-53 off the Lightship Nantucket in October 1916. After the United States entered World War I in April 1917, Cushing was sent overseas to patrol the Irish Sea out of Queenstown, Ireland. Cushing made several unsuccessful attacks on U-boats, and rescued survivors of several ships sunk by the German craft.

Upon returning to the United States after the war, Cushing was placed in reserve in reduced commission. She was decommissioned at Philadelphia in August 1920. She was struck for the Naval Vessel Register in January 1936 and was sold for scrapping in June.

=== USS Ericsson (DD-56) ===
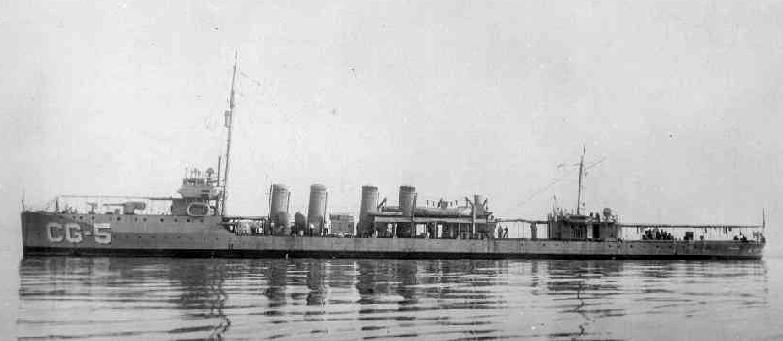
Ericsson in United States Coast Guard service, c. 1925–1930

USS Ericsson (Destroyer No. 56/DD-56) was laid down by the New York Shipbuilding of Camden, New Jersey, in November 1913 and launched in August of the following year. The ship was the second U.S. Navy vessel named in honor of John Ericsson, the Swedish-born builder of the ironclad warship USS Monitor during the American Civil War.

After Ericsson's May 1916 commissioning, she sailed off the east coast and in the Caribbean. She was one of the U.S. destroyers sent out to rescue survivors from five victims of the German submarine U-53 off the Lightship Nantucket in October 1916, and carried 81 passengers from a sunken British ocean liner to Newport, Rhode Island. After the United States entered World War I in April 1917, Ericsson was part of the first U.S. destroyer squadron sent overseas. Patrolling the Irish Sea out of Queenstown, Ireland, Ericsson made several unsuccessful attacks on U-boats, and rescued survivors of several ships sunk by the German craft.

Upon returning to the United States after the war, Ericsson conducted operations with the destroyers of the Atlantic Fleet until August 1919, when she was placed in reserve, still in commission. After a brief stint of operations in mid 1921, she was placed in reserve until she was decommissioned at Philadelphia in June 1922. In June 1924, Ericsson was transferred to the United States Coast Guard to help enforce Prohibition as a part of the "Rum Patrol". She operated under the name USCGC Ericsson (CG-5) until May 1932, when she was returned to the Navy. She was sold for scrap in August 1934.

== Bibliography ==
- Bauer, K. Jack; Roberts, Stephen S. (1991). Register of Ships of the U.S. Navy, 1775–1990: Major Combatants. New York: Greenwood Press. ISBN 978-0-313-26202-9. OCLC 24010356.
- Cashman, Sean Dennis (1988). America in the Age of the Titans: The Progressive Era and World War I. New York: New York University Press. ISBN 978-0-8147-1411-9. OCLC 17234055.
- Friedman, Norman (2004) [1982]. U.S. destroyers: An Illustrated Design History (rev. ed.). Annapolis, Maryland: Naval Institute Press. ISBN 978-1-55750-442-5. OCLC 51861947.
- Gardiner, Robert, ed. (1985). Conway's All the World's Fighting Ships 1906–1921. Annapolis, Maryland: Naval Institute Press. ISBN 978-0-87021-907-8. OCLC 12119866.
- Naval History & Heritage Command. "Cushing". Dictionary of American Naval Fighting Ships. Navy Department, Naval History and Heritage Command.
- Naval History & Heritage Command. "Ericsson". Dictionary of American Naval Fighting Ships. Navy Department, Naval History & Heritage Command.
- Naval History & Heritage Command. "McDougal". Dictionary of American Naval Fighting Ships. Navy Department, Naval History & Heritage Command.
- Naval History & Heritage Command. "Nicholson". Dictionary of American Naval Fighting Ships. Navy Department, Naval History & Heritage Command.
- Naval History & Heritage Command. "O'Brien". Dictionary of American Naval Fighting Ships. Navy Department, Naval History & Heritage Command.
- Naval History & Heritage Command. "Tucker". Dictionary of American Naval Fighting Ships. Navy Department, Naval History & Heritage Command.
- Naval History & Heritage Command. "Winslow". Dictionary of American Naval Fighting Ships. Navy Department, Naval History & Heritage Command.
- Osborne, Eric W. (June 2005). Tucker, Spencer C (ed.). Destroyers: An Illustrated History of Their Impact. Weapons and Warfare Series. Santa Barbara, California: ABC-CLIO. ISBN 978-1-85109-484-4. OCLC 58535705.
- Sweetman, Jack (1984). American Naval History: An Illustrated Chronology of the U.S. Navy and Marine Corps, 1775–Present. Annapolis, Maryland: Naval Institute Press. ISBN 978-0-87021-290-1. OCLC 11043081.
- Silverstone, Paul H., U.S. Warships of World War I (Ian Allan, 1970), ISBN 0-71100-095-6.
