= USS Nicholson (TB-29) =

Torpedo boat of the United States Navy

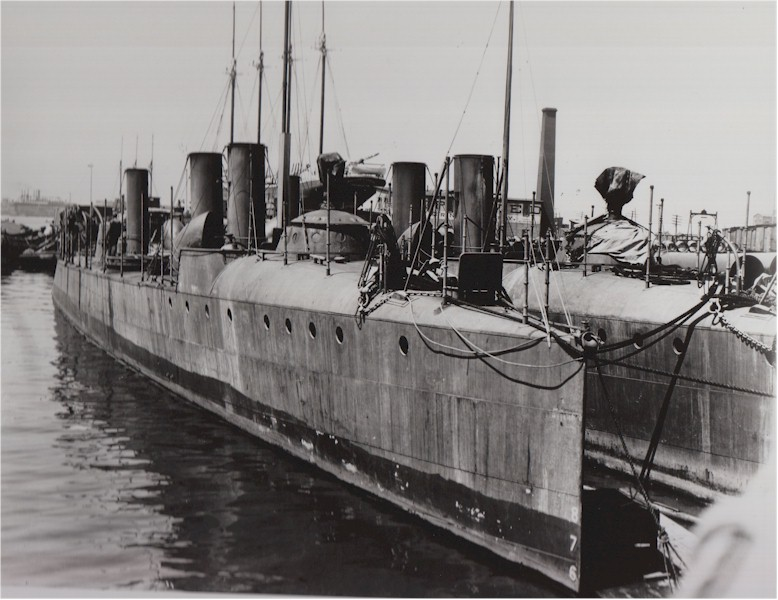
- USS Nicholson (TB-29), circa 1902, location unknown.

History

United States
- Name: Nicholson
- Namesake: James Nicholson; Samuel Nicholson; John Nicholson; William Nicholson; James W. Nicholson
- Builder: Lewis Nixon Shipyard, Elizabethtown, New Jersey
- Laid down: 6 December 1898
- Launched: 23 September 1901
- Sponsored by: Mrs. Oliver Hazard Perry Belmont
- Commissioned: 10 January 1905
- Decommissioned: date unknown
- Stricken: 3 March 1909
- Fate: Used as a target

General characteristics
- Class & type: Blakely-class torpedo boat
- Displacement: 218 long tons (221 t)
- Length: 157 ft (48 m)
- Beam: 17 ft 8 in (5.38 m)
- Draft: 6 ft 5 in (1.96 m) (mean)
- Installed power: not known
- Propulsion: not known
- Speed: 25 kn (29 mph; 46 km/h); 25.74 kn (29.62 mph; 47.67 km/h) (Speed on Trial)
- Complement: 28 officers and enlisted
- Armament: 3 × 1-pounder, 2 × 18 inch (450 mm) torpedo tubes

USS Nicholson (TB-29) was a Blakely-class torpedo boat in the United States Navy.

== Built in Elizabeth, New Jersey ==
The first ship to be so named by the Navy, Nicholson (TB–29) was laid down 6 December 1898 by Lewis Nixon's Crescent Shipyard, Elizabethport, New Jersey; launched 23 September 1901; sponsored by Mrs. Oliver Hazard Perry Belmont; and commissioned at New York City 10 January 1905.

== Service with the U.S. Navy ==
Nicholson served with the Atlantic Fleet until struck from the Navy List 3 March 1909.

== Inactivation ==
Nicholson was disposed of by being used as a target.
