= USS Nicholson (DD-52) =

O'Brien-class destroyer

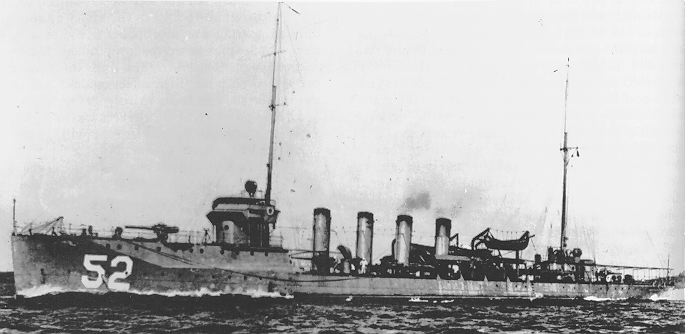
- Nicholson during trials in 1915

History

United States
- Name: Nicholson
- Namesake: Nicholson family: James Nicholson; Samuel Nicholson; John Nicholson; William Nicholson; James W. Nicholson.
- Ordered: March 1913
- Builder: William Cramp & Sons, Philadelphia
- Cost: $853,845.93 (hull and machinery)
- Yard number: 405
- Laid down: 8 September 1913
- Launched: 19 August 1914
- Sponsored by: Mrs. Charles T. Taylor
- Commissioned: 30 April 1915
- Decommissioned: 26 May 1922
- Stricken: 7 January 1936
- Identification: Hull symbol:DD-52; Code letters:NIU
- Fate: Sold 30 June 1936, scrapped

General characteristics
- Class & type: O'Brien-class destroyer
- Displacement: 1,050 long tons (1,070 t); 1,171 long tons (1,190 t) fully loaded
- Length: 305 ft 3 in (93.04 m)
- Beam: 31 ft 1 in (9.47 m)
- Draft: 9 ft 6 in (2.90 m) (mean); 10 ft 7 in (3.23 m) max
- Installed power: 4 × White-Forster boilers; 17,000 shp (13,000 kW)
- Propulsion: 2 × Zoelly direct-drive steam turbines; 2 × screw propellers
- Speed: 29 kn (33 mph; 54 km/h); 29.08 kn (33.46 mph; 53.86 km/h) (Speed on Trial)
- Complement: 5 officers 96 enlisted
- Armament: 4 × 4 in (100 mm)/50 caliber guns; 8 × 21 inch (533 mm) torpedo tubes (4 × 2)

USS Nicholson (Destroyer No. 52/DD-52) was an O'Brien-class destroyer built for the United States Navy before the American entry into World War I. The ship was the second U.S. Navy vessel named in honor of five members of the Nicholson family who rendered distinguished service in the American Revolutionary War, the War of 1812, and the American Civil War: brothers James, Samuel, and John Nicholson; William Nicholson, son of John; and James W. Nicholson, grandson of Samuel.

Nicholson was laid down by William Cramp & Sons of Philadelphia in September 1913 and launched in August 1914. The ship was a little more than 305 ft (93 m) in length, just over 31 feet (9.4 m) abeam, and had a standard displacement of 1,050 long tons (1,070 t). She was armed with four 4 in (100 mm) guns and had eight 21 inch (533 mm) torpedo tubes. Nicholson was powered by a pair of steam turbines that propelled her at up to 29 kn (33 mph; 54 km/h).

After her April 1915 commissioning, Nicholson sailed off the east coast and in the Caribbean. After the United States entered World War I in April 1917, Nicholson was sent overseas to patrol the Irish Sea out of Queenstown, Ireland. In October 1917, Nicholson steamed to the rescue of J. L. Luckenbach, driving off German submarine U-62, which had shelled the American cargo ship for over three hours. In November, Nicholson and another US destroyer, Fanning, were responsible for sinking German submarine U-58, the first submarine taken by US forces during the war. In September 1918, Nicholson helped drive off U-82 after that U-boat had torpedoed the American troopship Mount Vernon off the coast of France.

Upon returning to the United States after the war, Nicholson was placed in reduced commission in November 1919. She was decommissioned at Philadelphia in May 1922. She was struck from the Naval Vessel Register in January 1936 and sold for scrapping in June.

== Design and construction ==
Nicholson was authorized in March 1913 as the second of six ships of the O'Brien class, which was an improved version of the Cassin-class destroyers authorized in 1911. Construction of the vessel was awarded to William Cramp & Sons of Philadelphia which laid down her keel on 8 September 1913, the same date as of sister ship O'Brien. On 19 August 1914, Nicholson was launched by sponsor Mrs. Charles T. Taylor. The ship was the second US Navy ship named after five members of the Nicholson family who gave distinguished service in the American Revolutionary War, the War of 1812, and the American Civil War. They were brothers James Nicholson, the senior Continental Navy Captain; Samuel Nicholson, the first captain of USS Constitution; and John Nicholson; Also honored were William Nicholson, son of John; and James W. Nicholson, grandson of Samuel.

As built, the destroyer was 305 ft 3 in (93.04 m) in length, 31 ft 1 in (9.47 m) abeam, and drew 10 ft 4.5 in (3.162 m). The ship had a standard displacement of 1,050 long tons (1,070 t) and displaced 1,171 long tons (1,190 t) when fully loaded.

Nicholson had two Zoelly steam turbines that drove her two screw propellers, and an additional pair triple-expansion steam engines, each connected to one of the propeller shafts, for cruising purposes. Four oil-burning White-Forster boilers powered the engines, which could generate 17,000 shp (13,000 kW), moving the ship at up to 29 kn (33 mph; 54 km/h). Nicholson reached an average speed of 29.084 kn (33.469 mph; 53.864 km/h) over a 4-hour run during sea trials on 23 March 1915.

Nicholson's main battery consisted of four 4 in (102 mm)/50 caliber Mark 9 guns, (Note: The 50 denotes the length of the gun barrels; in this case, the gun is 50 calibers, meaning that the gun is 50 times as long as its bore, or 200 inches (5.1 m) in this case. The Mark number is the version of the gun; in this case, the ninth US Navy design of the 4-inch/50 gun.) with each gun weighing in excess of 6,100 lb (2,800 kg). The guns fired 33 lb (15 kg) armor-piercing projectiles at 2,900 ft/s (880 m/s). At an elevation of 20°, the guns had a range of 15,920 yd (14,560 m).

Nicholson was also equipped with eight 21 in (530 mm) torpedo tubes. The General Board of the United States Navy had called for two anti-aircraft guns for the O'Brien-class ships, as well as provisions for laying up to 36 floating mines. From sources, it is unclear if these recommendations were followed for Nicholson or any of the other ships of the class.

== World War I ==
Nicholson was commissioned into the United States Navy on 30 April 1915. After a shakedown cruise in the North Atlantic, Nicholson operated in the Caribbean and along the east coast until early 1917.

After the United States declared war on Germany on 6 April 1917 entering World War I, Nicholson was put to sea from New York on 15 May with Cummings, Cushing, O'Brien, and Sampson. The destroyers arrived at Queenstown, Ireland, 24 May for duty in the war zone.

In mid-October, Nicholson was part of the destroyer escort, for the eastbound convoy HS 14. At 0850, an SOS was received from SS J. L. Luckenbach, traveling independently some 90 nmi (100 mi; 170 km) ahead of the convoy. Commander Alfred W. Johnson on USS Conyngham (DD-58), the commander of the escorting destroyer unit, dispatched Nicholson to steam ahead to assist J. L. Luckenbach, which was being shelled by a German submarine. J. L. Luckenbach was equipped with guns of her own, but they were outranged by the pair of 8.8 cm (3.5 in) deck guns on her attacker, U-62. By the time Nicholson arrived on the scene at about 1230, U-62 had been shelling J. L. Luckenbach for over three hours. Despite many rounds fired, only about a dozen had hit the American steamer; some of the hits, however, had ignited J. L. Luckenbach's cargo of cotton. (Note: J. L. Luckenbach had originally been the North German Lloyd passenger vessel SS Saale, which had burned at Hoboken, New Jersey in June 1900 with the loss of nearly a hundred persons. Coincidentally, the fire in New Jersey had begun when cotton on the pier next to Saale had ignited and spread to the ship. See: Helgason, Guðmundur. "Ships hit during WWI: J. L. Luckenbach". German and Austrian U-boats of World War I - Kaiserliche Marine - Uboat.net.) Nicholson trained her 4 in (100 mm) guns on the U-boat and, by the time her gunners had fired a second round, U-62 submerged and disappeared. The destroyer transferred a damage control party aboard J. L. Luckenbach which helped extinguish the fire and repair some of the damages to the ship. A few hours later, J. L. Luckenbach and Nicholson joined and rejoined the convoy, respectively.

=== Sinking of U-58 ===
The following month, Nicholson had a more successful encounter with a U-boat. Operating as the destroyer division's flagship, Nicholson - under the command of Lieutenant Commander Frank D. Berrien - and her group had joined the eastbound convoy OQ 20 on the afternoon of 17 November. At about 1615, Fanning was steaming to her position at the rear of the eight-ship convoy when her lookouts spotted a periscope just ahead. The periscope belonged to U-58 under the command of Kapitänleutnant Gustav Amberger, who was lining up a torpedo shot on the British steamer SS Welshman.

While Fanning circled around and dropped a depth charge on the spot where the periscope had been seen, Nicholson, which had raced through the convoy, dropped another in nearly the same location; both were to good effect. The two depth charges knocked out the electric motor that powered U-58's diving planes, making the vessel unmanageable. U-58 broached the surface momentarily and Fanning dropped another trio of depth charges over the submarine. These three knocked out all electrical power and the manual diving plane controls, which caused the submarine to descend through a depth of 164 ft (50 m). Amberger ordered the ballast tanks blown and the submarine slowly rose to the surface, stabilizing on the surface with her bow pointing down. The submarines' four officers and 35 men evacuated U-58 and surrendered to Fanning at 16:28, but not before opening the sea valves to allow the U-boat to sink. One of U-58's crewmen drowned before reaching Fanning, while another died of a heart attack after he was brought aboard the destroyer.

An official account of the sinking was released to the press on 29 December, and Fanning and Nicholson shared credit for what The Washington Post in a contemporary news account called the "first U-Boat prize of the U.S." during the war; later works still credit the pair of destroyers with the US Navy's first U-Boat kill.

In February 1918, Nicholson transferred to Brest where she escorted convoys along the French coast. In early September 1918, Nicholson was one of six destroyers escorting a westbound pair of US Navy transports, Agamemnon and Mount Vernon. On the morning of 5 September, about 250 nmi (290 mi; 460 km) west of Brest, German submarine U-82 torpedoed Mount Vernon, knocking out half of the troopship's boilers. Nicholson, Conner, Winslow, and Wainwright, all depth charged the U-boat without success, but, combined with defensive efforts from Mount Vernon herself, helped prevent the submarine from launching a coup de grâce against the former German liner. Mount Vernon safely made it back to Brest with the loss of 37 crewmen out of the 1,450 passengers and crew on board.

== Postwar period ==
Following the signing of the Armistice on 11 November, which ended all fighting, Nicholson remained in French waters. After arriving at New York on 10 January 1919, Nicholson resumed operations along the east coast until placed in reserve at Philadelphia on 27 November.

In July 1920, she was assigned the hull code of DD-52 under the US Navy's alphanumeric classification system. In May 1921, Nicholson was reactivated with a reduced complement. She remained active for about a year, until she was decommissioned at Philadelphia on 26 May 1922. The ship was struck from the Naval Vessel Register on 7 January 1936, and on 30 June was sold for scrapping.
