= USS Nicholson =

Four ships of the United States Navy have borne the name USS Nicholson, named in honor of the Nicholson family, James; Samuel; John; William; and James W.

- USS Nicholson (TB-29), was a Blakely-class torpedo boat, launched in 1901 and struck in 1909
- USS Nicholson (DD-52), was a O’Brien-class destroyer, launched in 1913 and struck in 1936
- USS Nicholson (DD-442), was a Gleaves-class destroyer, launched in 1940 and decommissioned and transferred to Italy in 1951. She served in the Italian Navy as Aviere. She was stricken and sunk as target in 1975.
- USS Nicholson (DD-982), was a Spruance-class destroyer, launched in 1977 and sunk as a target in 2004.
