= USS Nicholson (DD-982) =

Spruance-class destroyer

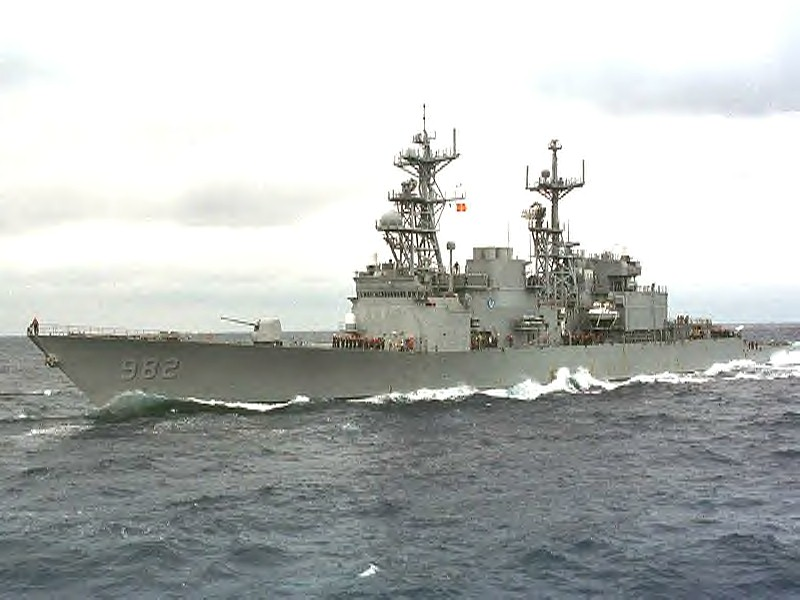
- USS Nicholson on 20 January 2001

History

United States
- Name: Nicholson
- Namesake: James Nicholson
- Ordered: 15 January 1974
- Builder: Ingalls Shipbuilding
- Laid down: 20 February 1976
- Launched: 11 November 1977
- Acquired: 23 April 1979
- Commissioned: 12 May 1979
- Decommissioned: 20 December 2002
- Stricken: 6 April 2004
- Identification: Callsign: NICK; Hull number: DD-982
- Motto: Latin: Fortes Fortuna Adiuvat; 'Fortune Favors the Brave'
- Fate: Sunk as target, 30 July 2004
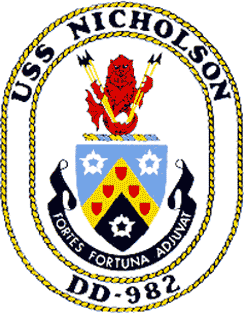
- Badge: Ship's crest

General characteristics
- Class & type: Spruance-class destroyer
- Displacement: 8,040 long tons (8,170 t) full load
- Length: 529 ft (161 m) waterline; 563 ft (172 m) overall
- Beam: 55 ft (17 m)
- Draft: 29 ft (8.8 m)
- Installed power: 3 × 501-K17 generator sets (2,000 kW (2,700 hp) each)
- Propulsion: 4 × General Electric LM2500 gas turbines, 2 shafts, 80,000 shp (60 MW)
- Speed: 32.5 knots (60.2 km/h; 37.4 mph)
- Range: 6,000 nmi (11,000 km; 6,900 mi) at 20 knots (37 km/h; 23 mph)
- Complement: 19 officers, 315 enlisted
- Sensors & processing systems: AN/SPS-40 air search radar; AN/SPG-60 fire control radar; AN/SPS-55 surface search radar; AN/SPQ-9 gun fire control radar; Mark 23 TAS automatic detection and tracking radar; AN/SPS-65 missile fire control radar; AN/SQS-53 bow-mounted active sonar; AN/SQR-19 TACTAS towed array passive sonar; Naval Tactical Data System
- Electronic warfare & decoys: AN/SLQ-32 electronic warfare system; AN/SLQ-25 Nixie torpedo countermeasures; Mark 36 SRBOC decoy launching system; AN/SLQ-49 inflatable decoys
- Armament: 2 × 5 in (127 mm) 54 caliber Mark 45 dual purpose guns; 2 × 20 mm Phalanx CIWS Mark 15 guns; 1 × 8 cell ASROC launcher (removed); 1 × 8 cell NATO Sea Sparrow Mark 29 missile launcher; 2 × quadruple Harpoon missile canisters; 2 × Mark 32 triple 12.75 in (324 mm) torpedo tubes (Mk 46 torpedoes); 1 × 61 cell Mk 41 VLS launcher for Tomahawk missiles; 1 × 21 cell RIM-116 Rolling Airframe Missile launcher
- Aircraft carried: 2 × Sikorsky SH-60 Seahawk LAMPS III helicopters
- Aviation facilities: Flight deck and enclosed hangar for up to two medium-lift helicopters

USS Nicholson (DD-982), a Spruance-class destroyer, was the fourth ship of the United States Navy to be named for a family which was prominent in early American naval history, including James Nicholson, the senior Continental Navy Captain, and Samuel Nicholson, the first captain of USS Constitution.

== History ==
Nicholson was laid down on 20 February 1976 by the Ingalls Shipbuilding, in Pascagoula, Miss.; launched on 11 November 1977; and commissioned on 12 May 1979. She first deployed on 18 November 1980. Nicholson deployed to the Persian Gulf in 1983 and returned to Charleston SC via the Suez Canal with a refueling stop in Djibouti. The crew enjoyed a port visit to Barcelona, Spain on the way back to home port. The ship encountered heavy seas on the voyage west across the Atlantic and experienced a casualty to the sonar dome. The dome was subsequently repaired in conjunction with a scheduled maintenance period at the Brooklyn Navy Shipyard between May 1984 and Feb 1985. Following the maintenance period the ship returned to Charleston, SC and began work ups for the next deployment including, Combat Systems Ship Qualification Trials, an Anti-Submarine warfare exercise in the Caribbean and Refresher Training in Guantanamo Bay Cuba. Nicholson was deployed for six months, in February 1990, with USS Dahlgren, as part of the Mid-East Force in the Persian Gulf. The deployment was fairly routine except for two incidents. The first was a pair of armed Iranian F-4s that overflew the ship in the Straits of Hormuz, and the second was that Nicholson and Dahlgren left the Persian Gulf for home just a week before Iraq invaded Kuwait.

Nicholson was deployed for six months, in January 1992, as part of NATO's Standing Naval Force Atlantic. Nicholson joined the NATO task force in the Puerto Rican Op-areas and detached in Den Helder, Netherlands. Port Visits included Roosevelt Roads, Puerto Rico; St. Maarten, DVI; Boston, MA; Halifax, Nova Scotia; Tromso, Norway; Bergen, Norway; Den Helder, Neth; Antwerp, Belgium; Oporto, Portugal; Rosyth, Scotland; Frederikshavn, Denmark; Aarhus, Denmark; and St Johns, Newfoundland. Nicholson served as flagship for the second half of the deployment under a US Admiral, RADM Dwyer, USN. During the first half the force was under the command of a Dutch Commodore. Other ships in the task force were Norway – Frigate – HNoMS Oslo (first half); Canada – Frigate – HMCS Skeena (entire cruise); Portugal – Frigate – NRP Vasco da Gama (first half); Britain – Frigate – HMS Brave (first half) and Destroyer HMS Exeter (second half); Netherlands – Frigate – HNLMS Jacob Van Heemskerck (first half) and HNLMS Bloys van Treslong (second half); Denmark – Frigate – HDMS Olfert Fischer (second half); Germany – Frigates – Niedersachsen (first half) and Rheinland-Pfalz (second half).

Nicholson was deployed, in early 1994, with USS Saratoga, as part of Task Force 60 in the Persian Gulf, Mediterranean Sea and the Adriatic Sea in support of operations "Deny Flight," "Provide Promise" and "Sharp Guard".

As part of a reorganization announced in July 1995 of the U.S. Atlantic Fleet's surface combatant ships into six core battle groups, nine destroyer squadrons and a new Western Hemisphere Group, Nicholson was reassigned to Destroyer Squadron 18. The reorganization was to be phased in over the summer and take effect on 31 August, with homeport shifts occurring through 1998.

Nicholson departed the Charleston Naval Shipyard for sea trials, on 29 September 1995, following completion of an overhaul. Nicholson carried with it the distinction of being the last ship overhauled in the 94-year history of the shipyard as the Charleston Naval Shipyard was closing as a result of the base realignment and closure process of 1993. The ship did not return to the shipyard at the end of sea trials but proceeded to a new home port of Norfolk Naval Shipyard in Portsmouth, Virginia. The shipyard's official closing took place on 1 April 1996. Nicholson arrived at her new home port of Norfolk on 6 October 1995.

On 10 December 1996, Nicholson departed Norfolk Naval Shipyard for a scheduled six-month deployment to the Middle East Force. She, along with the USS Halyburton, relieved Norfolk-based USS Stump and Pascagoula, Mississippi-based USS Stephen W. Groves, then deployed in the Persian Gulf.

Nicholson took part, with the USS Enterprise carrier battle group in a Sink Exercise (SINKEX) near Puerto Rico on 9 August 1998, resulting in the sinking of the former USS Richmond K. Turner. The SINKEX developed the battle group's coordination of combined air and surface assaults, verified the performance of several weapons systems and enhanced the integration of joint units into naval battle scenarios. During the exercise, the USS Philippine Sea, USS Thorn, Nicholson and Carrier Air Wing Three also sent a parade of high-altitude, anti-radiation missiles, Harpoon anti-ship missiles and an assortment of laser-guided munitions to the decommissioned cruiser. The United States Air Force participated with a trio of 2,000-pound (907 kg) bombs.

Nicholson deployed with the Enterprise carrier battle group, with Carrier Air Wing Three (CVW 3) embarked, for a scheduled six-month deployment on 6 November 1998, and to relieve the USS Dwight D. Eisenhower carrier battle group in Operation Southern Watch. With the Enterprise CVBG, Nicholson took part in Operation Desert Fox, an operation designed to degrade Saddam Hussein's ability to deliver chemical, biological and nuclear weapons, and wage war against his neighbors, from 16 to 18 December 1998. During the 70-hour assault, Nicholson launched Tomahawk cruise missiles on Iraqi targets. Following this, and after departing the Persian Gulf on 2 January 1998, and transiting through the Suez Canal, Nicholson joined U.S. 6th Fleet and took part in Operation Allied Force, launching Tomahawks at numerous sites in Yugoslavia. She returned home on 6 May 1998.

Nicholson and the fast combat support ship USS Detroit were involved in a minor collision on 27 August 2000 about 100 nautical miles (185 km; 115 mi) east of Cape Henry (east of Norfolk). The collision occurred at approximately 8:45 pm local time while the ships were conducting a night underway replenishment. Initial reports indicated minor damage to both ships. Two Nicholson sailors also suffered minor injuries. Both ships were still seaworthy after the incident.

Nicholson deployed with the Enterprise carrier battle group and USS Kearsarge Amphibious Ready Group (ARG) for a scheduled six-month deployment. This was the 17th overseas deployment for Enterprise since her maiden voyage on 12 January 1962. The Enterprise CVBG and Kearsarge ARG relieved the USS Harry Truman CVBG and USS Nassau ARG, which deployed in November 2000. Though the Enterprise battle group departed on 25 April 2001, Nicholson and Thorn, scheduled as late-deployers, and USS McFaul joined the battle group after departing in June. Over the following six months, all these units conducted multi-national and joint operations with navies of various European countries, and visited ports in Mediterranean and Persian Gulf nations. Nicholson participated in strike missions against Afghanistan during 'Operation Enduring Freedom', firing Tomahawk missiles against targets, after 9/11. Nicholson earning "First to Strike" as she launched the first missile of the operation. She and the battle group returned to the U.S. November 2001.

Nicholson was decommissioned 20 December 2002; stricken 6 April 2004; and sunk as a target 30 July 2004.

== Ship's crest ==
The official crest of Nicholson symbolizes the service of five prominent American naval officers from the Nicholson family who served in the United States Navy during the American Revolutionary War, the War of 1812 and the American Civil War. The dominant colors of the crest are blue and gold, traditional to the Navy.

The five spears and the five shields each represent the five members of the Nicholson family. The shields are red, signifying that each namesake distinguished himself in combat during his service to his country. The chevron, a symbol of strength and support, alludes to the prow of the ship. The three bomb bursts signify the threefold mission of a Spruance class destroyer. The lower bomb burst symbolizes a subsurface depth charge or torpedo, while the two upper represent surface and aerial firepower. The sea lion is an ancient symbol of the sea and naval powers. The traditional Latin ship's motto, "FORTES FORTUNA ADIUVAT," translates to "Fortune Favors the Brave," or "Fortune favors the bold."

== Gallery ==
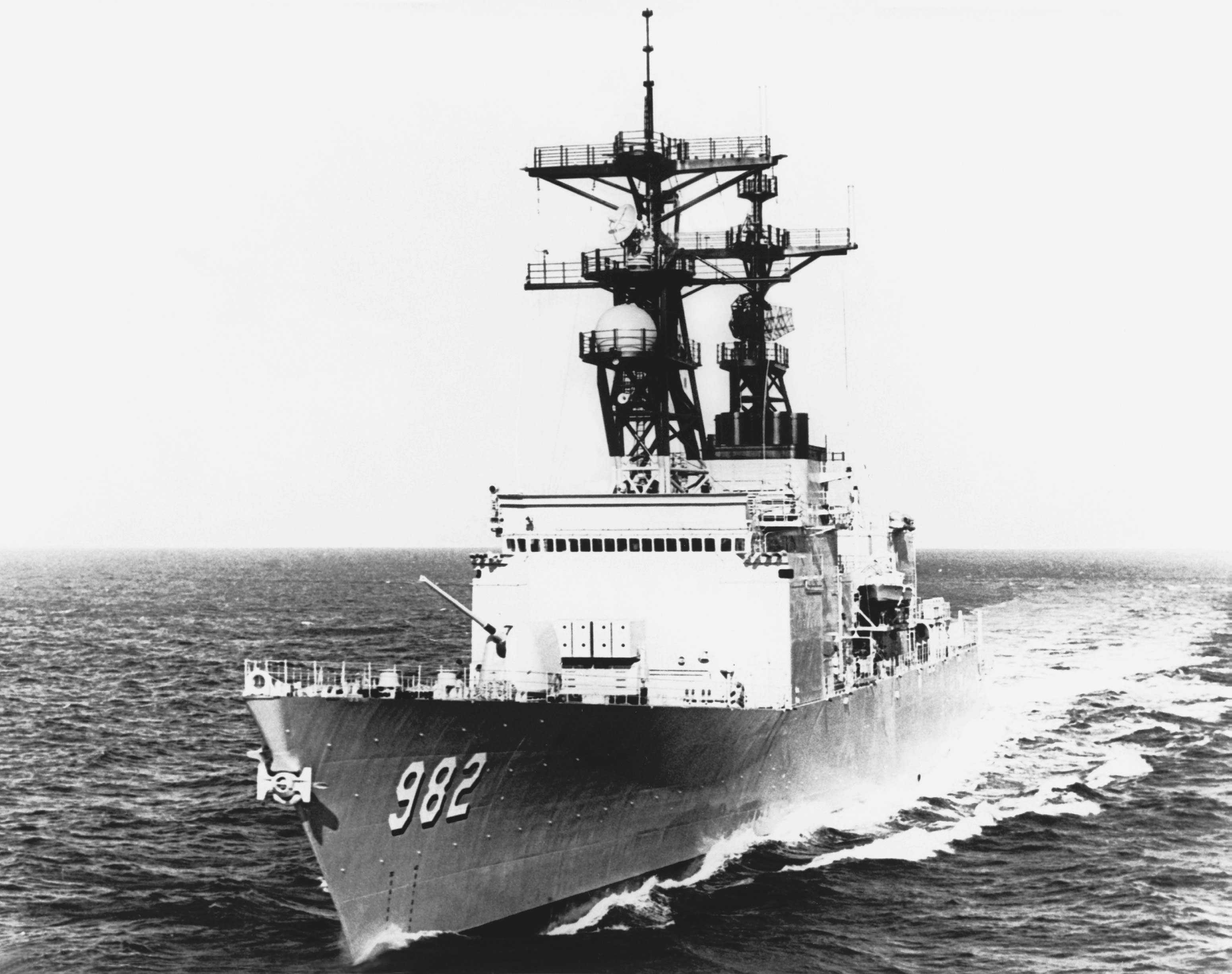
USS Nicholson on 1 April 1982

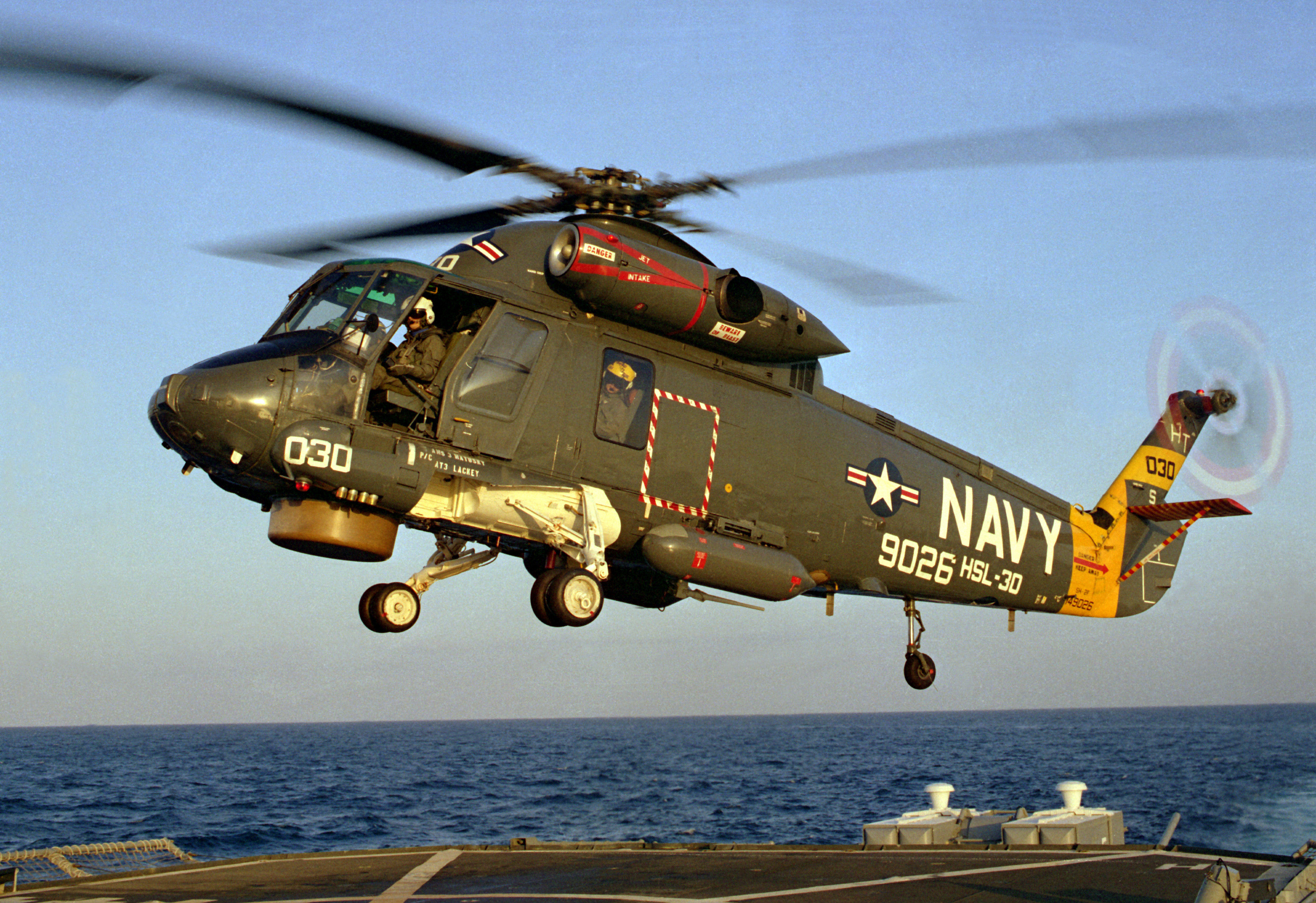
SH-2F Seasprite landing on USS Nicholson, 1 August 1983

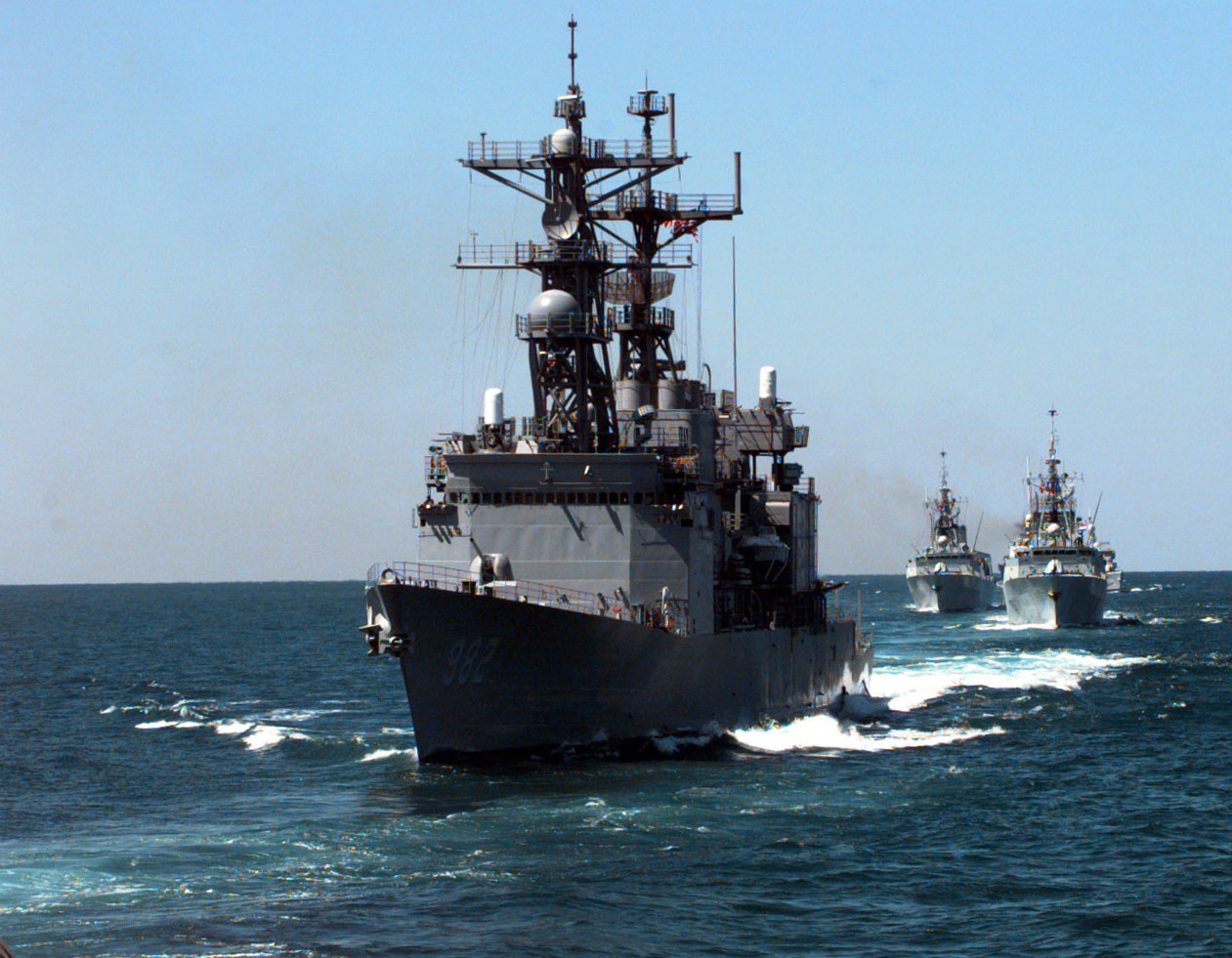
USS Nicholson on 23 March 1996

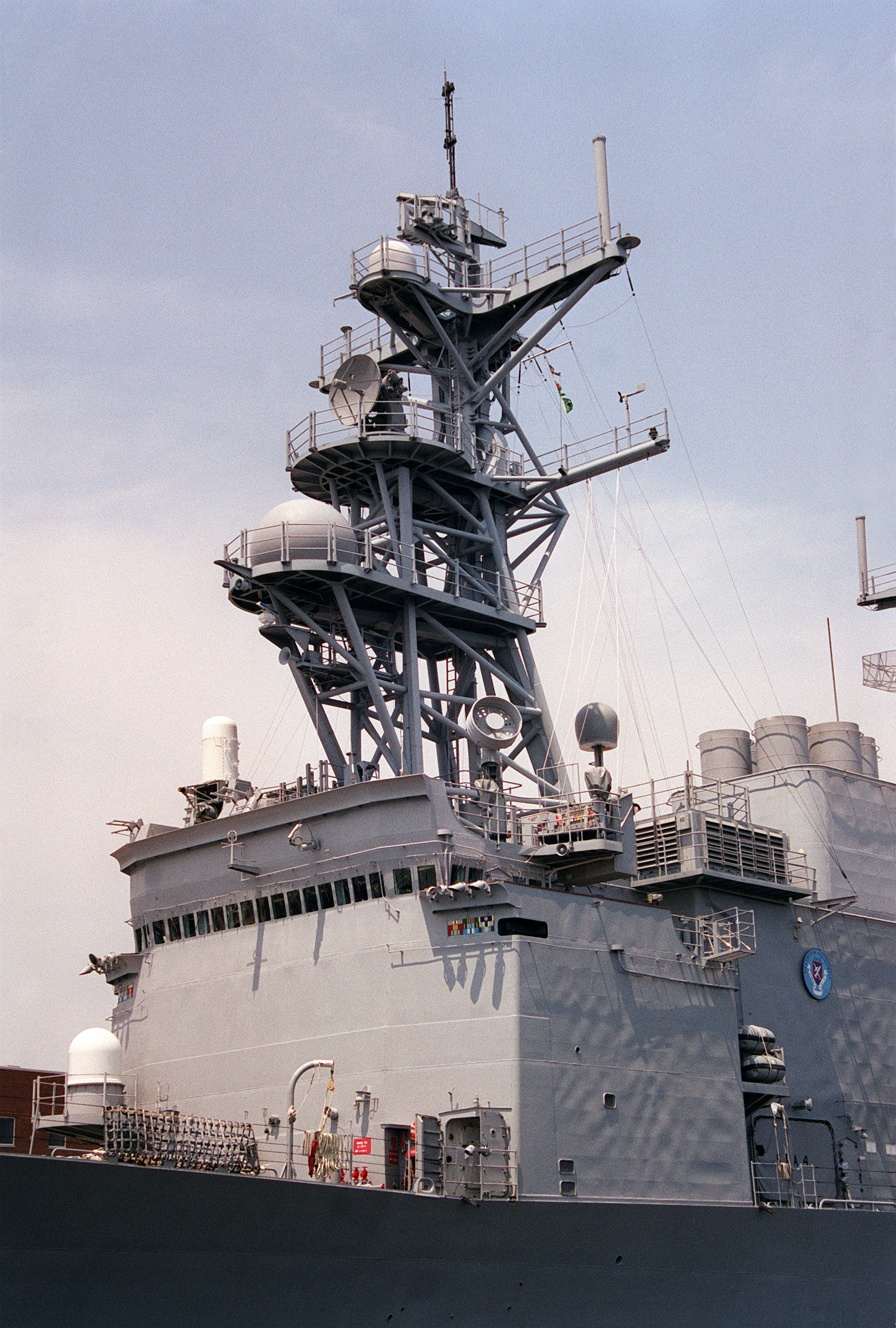
USS Nicholson on 13 May 2000
