= William Montague (cleric) =

American Anglican cleric

William Montague was an Anglican cleric at Old North Church in Boston and St. Paul's in Dedham, Massachusetts.

== Personal life ==
Coat of Arms of William Montague

Montague was born in South Hadley, Massachusetts on September 23, 1757, to Joseph and Sarah Henry Montague. He was graduated from Dartmouth College in 1784.

He was married to Jane Little. Their daughter, also named Jane Little Montague, was a teacher at the Mill Village School and the First Middle School in Dedham. Another daughter, Sarah Ann Montague, taught in the East Street School. She had a son who served in the Civil War as a captain in the 38th Infantry Regiment.

While in England, Montague obtained the musket ball that killed Joseph Warren. His son, William Henry Montague, donated it to the New England Historic Genealogical Society, an organization he helped found. Montague also fought in the Revolutionary War.

He died in Dedham July 22, 1833 after three years as a paralytic.

== Ministry ==
He was ordained by Bishop Samuel Seabury of Connecticut. Montague was rector of Old North Church in Boston from 1787 to 1792. After traveling to London in 1790, he became the first minister ordained in America to occupy a pulpit of the English Church.

In May 1777, Rev. William Clark, a Tory, was charged by the Board of Selectmen in Dedham of being a traitor to the American Revolution. He was arrested and jailed for 10 weeks on a prison ship. In June 1778, Fisher Ames obtained a pass for him and Clark was allowed to leave America. It was not until 1791 that the congregation regrouped and called Montague.

Montague received a salary in Dedham of £100 sterling, but was not popular as a minister as he was more focused on administering the temporal affairs of the church, notably the Colburn grant, than his spiritual ones. He remained in the Dedham church until 1818. (Note: Burgess has his departure as being in 1815.) He lived on the south side High Street, near the intersection with East Street. (Note: The Titcomb family later lived in this house.)

Richard Cranch, Abigail Adams' nephew, wrote to President John Adams saying the he, Fisher Ames, and several others wanted Adams to appoint Montague as a chaplain of the USS Constitution. Cranch said the appointment also had the approval of the captain of the ship, Samuel Nicholson.

== Teaching career ==
Monatague taught in the First Middle School for three winters in 1793–94, 1794–95, and 1795–96. In 1800, he taught in Dorchester. (Note: His assistant was Lawrence Sprague, the son of Dr. John Sprague of Dedham.) He is said to have excelled as a teacher of mathematics.

== Works cited ==
- Knudsen, Harold M. (2025). Fisher Ames, Christian Founding Father & Federalist. Liberty Hill Publishing.
- Dedham Historical Society (2001). Images of America:Dedham. Arcadia Publishing. ISBN 978-0-7385-0944-0.
- Hurd, Duane Hamilton (1884). History of Norfolk County, Massachusetts: With Biographical Sketches of Many of Its Pioneers and Prominent Men. J. W. Lewis & Company.
- Hanson, Robert Brand (1976). Dedham, Massachusetts, 1635-1890. Dedham Historical Society.
- Slafter, Carlos (1905). A Record of Education: The Schools and Teachers of Dedham, Massachusetts, 1644-1904. Dedham Transcript Press.
- Worthington, Erastus (1827). The history of Dedham: from the beginning of its settlement, in September 1635, to May 1827. Dutton and Wentworth.
- Clarke, Wm. Horatio (1903). Mid-Century Memories of Dedham. Dedham Historical Society.
