= Egyptian Expedition (1882) =

American military expedition

- Part of the Second Anglo-Egyptian War
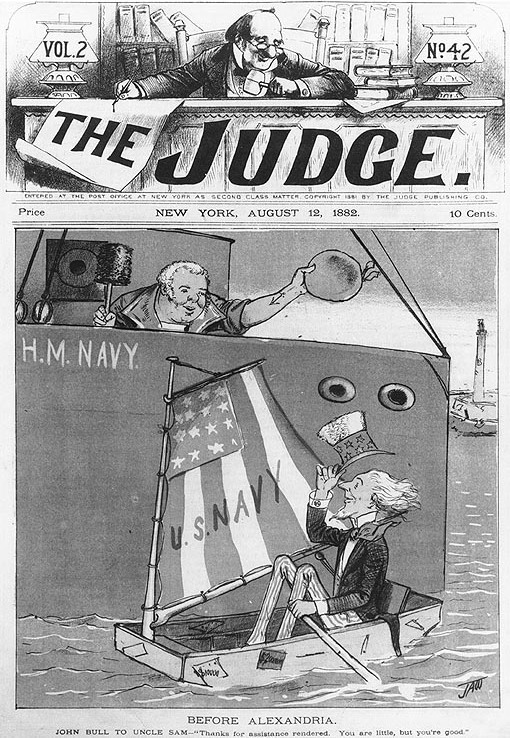
- Front page of "The Judge" magazine, 12 August 1882, featuring a cartoon by "JAW" concerning aid rendered by the American navy during the British bombardment of Alexandria in July 1882.
Date	June – July 1882
Location	Alexandria, Egypt
Result	American victory

Belligerents
United States	Egypt

Commanders and leaders
(United States) James W. Nicholson (United States) Henry C. Cochrane	(Egypt) Ahmed Orabi

Strength
Land: 73 marines 57 sailors Sea: 1 corvette 1 sloop-of-war 1 gunboat	Unknown number of regular and civilian volunteer elements

Casualties and losses
None	Unknown

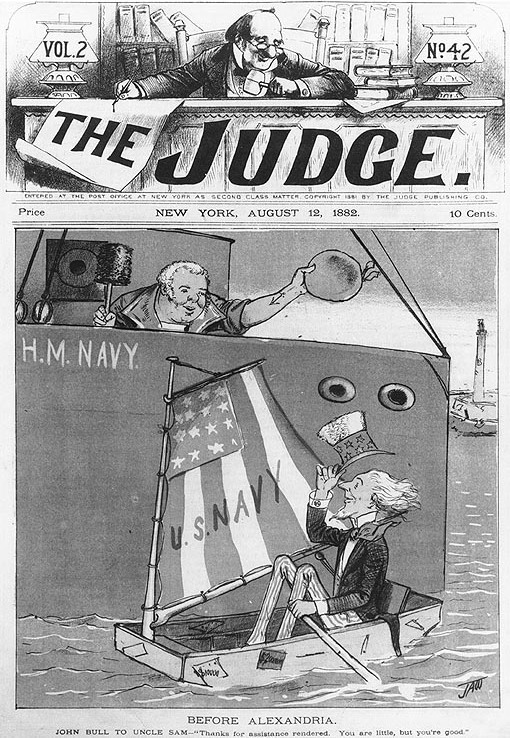
Front page of The Judge, 12 August 1882, featuring a cartoon by "JAW" concerning aid rendered by the American navy during the British bombardment of Alexandria in July 1882.

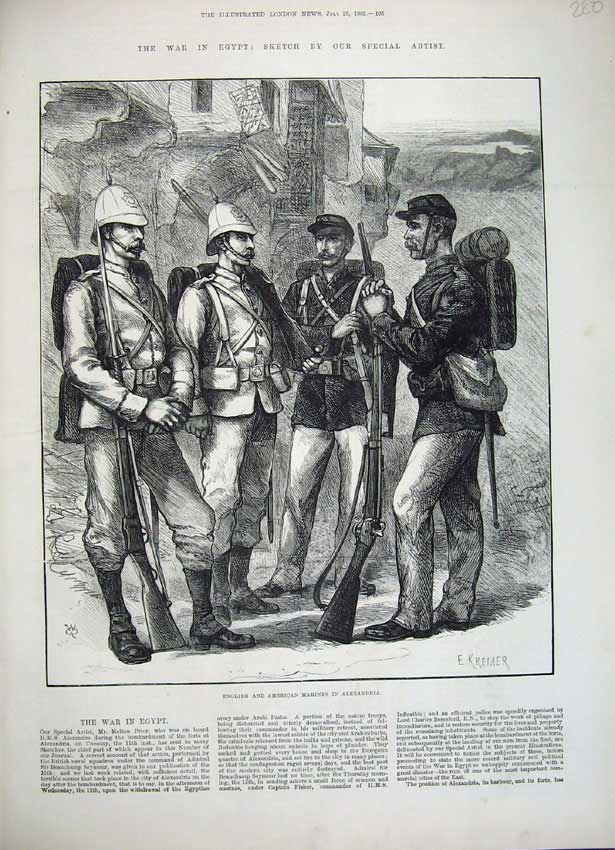
Two Royal Marines (left) and two U.S. Marines (right) in Alexandria during the expedition.

The Egyptian Expedition was a military expedition dispatched by the United States to Egypt during the 1882 Anglo-Egyptian War to protect American citizens and property. Responding to the possibility of war between Britain and Egypt, three United States Navy warships from the European Squadron under the command of Rear-Admiral James W. Nicholson were ordered to sail to Alexandria in mid-1882. Their goal was to observe any possible conflict offshore and intervene if necessary.

== Conflict ==
The first warship to arrive was Nicholson's flagship, the screw sloop USS Lancaster, which arrived near Alexandria's harbor on June 27, 1882. A few days later, the gunboat USS Nipsic arrived on July 1 and corvette USS Quinnebaug on July 12, both ships joining Nicholson's ship. Though a British Royal Navy fleet under the command of Admiral Beauchamp Seymour had anchored off Alexandria in May, the conflict did not break out until July 11. Seymour's ships initiated a naval bombardment of Egyptian forts in the city under the command of Ahmed Urabi; having been informed by the British of their intentions beforehand, Nicholson was able to inform all Americans in Alexandria of the bombardment to allow them to take necessary precautions to protect themselves and their property.

Though the Egyptian forts returned fire at the British fleet, they were eventually all silenced by July 13. During the bombardment, Nicholson's ships allowed Alexandrians who requested shelter or medical treatment to come aboard. By July 14, the bombardment was all but over, and Alexandria was in a state of anarchy, with fires ravaging the city. Remnants of Urabi's forces along with elements of the civilian population began attacking foreign residents, including American citizens.

In response, Nicholson decided to send a landing party ashore. United States Marine Corps captain Henry Clay Cochrane, along with two lieutenants, was assigned to command a force of 70 U.S. Marines and 57 American sailors with orders to occupy the American consulate, patrol the city, and fight the spreading fires which were ravaging the European section of Alexandria. The landing party was the first contingent of foreign troops to enter the city center after the bombardment, they were later followed by an occupation force of 4,000 Britons and the troops of other nations. By July 20, conditions in the city had largely improved so most of the marines and sailors were withdrawn except for a small force from USS Quinnebaug under Lieutenant Frank L. Denny which was removed on July 24, ending the operation.

== See also ==
- Battle of Taku Forts (1859)
- Battle of Kororareka
