= George Claghorn =

Builder of USS Constitution

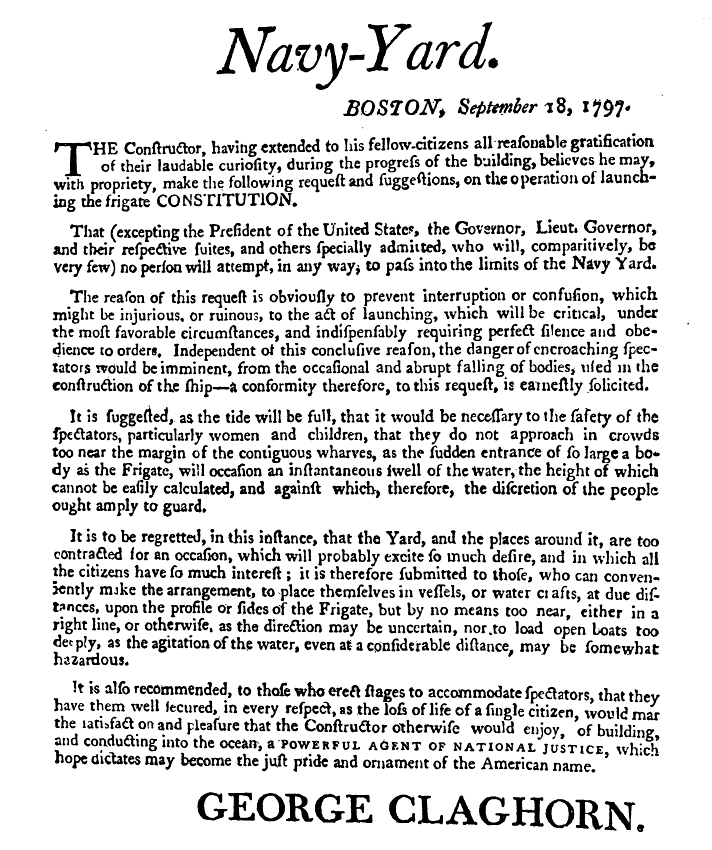
- Claghorn's announcement of the launching
- Born: July 17, 1748; Chilmark, Massachusetts
- Died: February 3, 1824 (aged 75); Seekonk, Massachusetts
- Occupation: Shipwright
- Known for: Military service in the American Revolutionary War and as the master shipbuilder of the USS Constitution (Old Ironsides)

George Claghorn (July 17, 1748 [O.S. July 6, 1748] – February 3, 1824) (Note: Contemporary records, which used the Julian calendar and the Annunciation Style of enumerating years, recorded his birth as July 6, 1748. The provisions of the British Calendar (New Style) Act 1750, implemented in 1752, altered the official British dating method to the Gregorian calendar with the start of the year on January 1 (it had been March 25). These changes resulted in dates being moved forward 11 days, and for those between January 1 and March 25, an advance of one year. For a further explanation, see: Old Style and New Style dates.) (Note: Engber, Daniel (January 18, 2006). "What's Benjamin Franklin's Birthday?". Slate. (Both Franklin's and Claghorn's confusing birth dates are clearly explained.)) was an American patriot and shipwright. He served as an officer in the American Revolutionary War and was wounded in the Battle of Bunker Hill. After the war, he was awarded the rank of colonel in the Massachusetts militia. Claghorn was the master shipbuilder of the USS Constitution (a.k.a. Old Ironsides), which he and Samuel Nicholson built for the early United States Navy (Note: Not to be confused with the first Continental Navy, construction of Constitution was authorized by the Naval Act of 1794.) during the years 1794–1797. Old Ironsides is the oldest naval vessel in the world that is still commissioned, afloat and seaworthy. (Note: HMS Victory is the oldest commissioned vessel by three decades; however, Victory has been in dry dock since 1922.)

== Personal life ==
Claghorn was born in 1748, the ninth child of Experience (née: Hawes) and Shubael Claghorn in Chilmark, Massachusetts on Martha's Vineyard. As a family name, Claghorn (also Cleghorn) appears in Scottish records as early as 1350 in Edinburgh, Cramond, Lothian and Corstorphine. His great-grandfather, James, had been brought to New England in 1650 as a prisoner of war during the Scottish Rebellion, following the Battle of Dunbar. George Claghorn married Deborah Brownell of Dartmouth on December 20, 1769, and they had eight children. He died in 1824 in Seekonk, Massachusetts.

== Military career ==
George Claghorn served in the Massachusetts militia during the American Revolution. He was shot and wounded in the knee at the battle of Bunker Hill. After the war, Claghorn was promoted to the rank of colonel in the militia.

=== Breed's Hill ===
Most of what is known as the "battle of Bunker Hill" was actually fought just less than a half mile away at Breed's Hill in the Charlestown section of Boston, Massachusetts. The battle was fought on June 17, 1775, during the Siege of Boston in the early stages of the American Revolutionary War. In that battle 450 American fighters were killed or wounded. After receiving a gunshot wound to the knee, Claghorn went on to lead his militia troops in more battles eventually attaining the rank of Major during the war.

== Old Ironsides ==
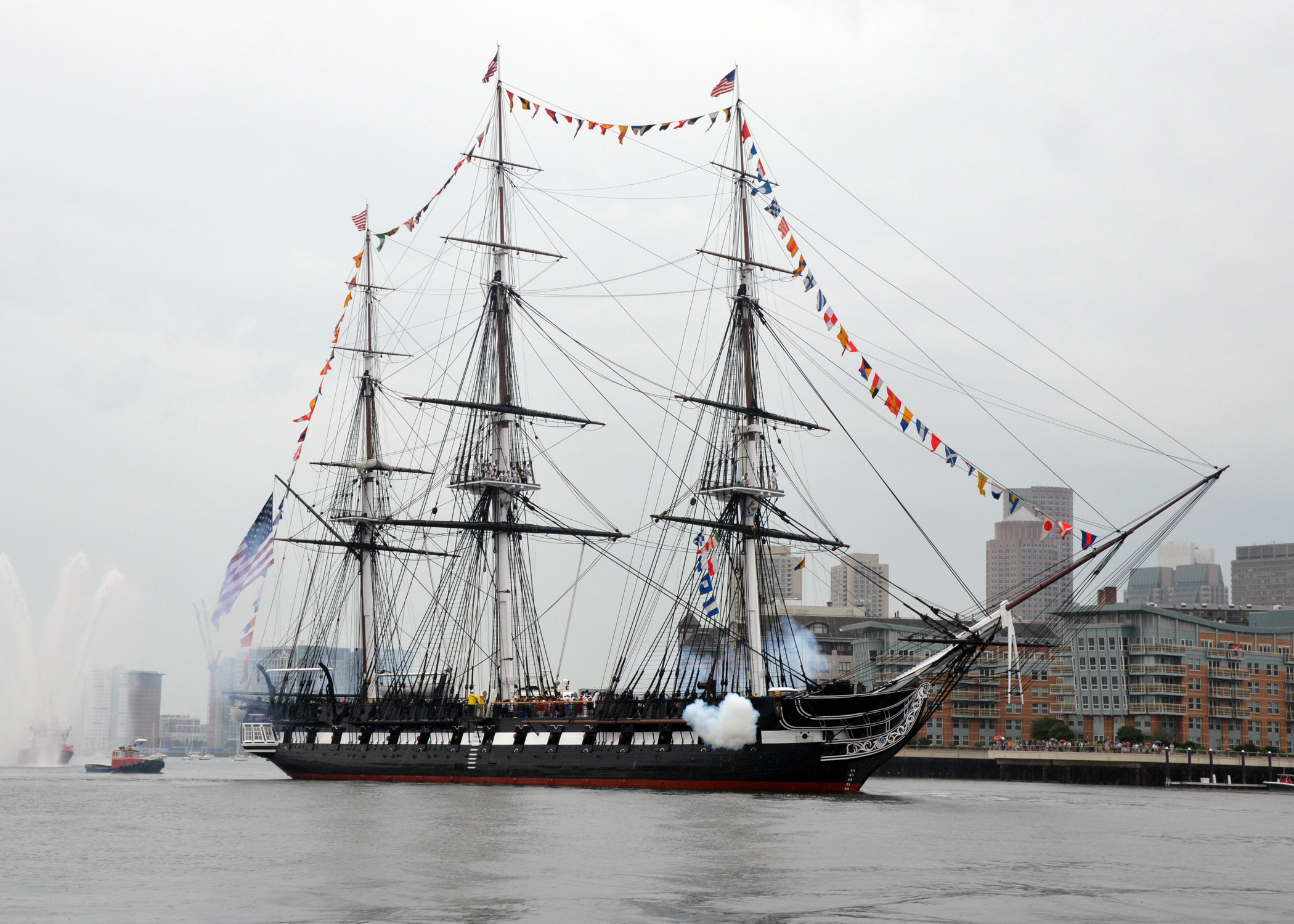
Constitution firing a 17-gun salute in 2014 near the U.S. Coast Guard Base, Boston, during the ship's "Independence Day underway" demonstration in Boston Harbor

The keel of the USS Constitution was laid down on November 1, 1794, at Edmund Hartt's shipyard in the North End of Boston, Massachusetts, under the supervision of Captain Samuel Nicholson and master shipbuilder, Colonel George Claghorn.

In March 1796, as construction slowly progressed, a peace accord was announced between the United States and Algiers and, in accordance with the Naval Act of 1794, construction was halted. After some debate and prompting by President Washington, Congress agreed to continue to fund the construction of the three ships nearest to completion: United States, Constellation, and Constitution. Constitution's launching ceremony on September 20, 1797, was attended by then President John Adams and Massachusetts Governor Increase Sumner. Upon launch, she slid down the ways only 27 feet (8.2 m) before stopping; her weight had caused the ways to settle into the ground, preventing further movement. An attempt two days later resulted in only an additional 31 feet (9.4 m) of travel before the ship again stopped. After a month of rebuilding the ways, Constitution finally slipped into Boston Harbor on October 21, 1797, with Captain James Sever breaking a bottle of Madeira wine on her bowsprit.

Constitution is a wooden-hulled, three-masted heavy frigate of the United States Navy, named by President George Washington after the Constitution of the United States of America. Launched in 1797, Constitution was one of six original frigates authorized for construction by the Naval Act of 1794 and the third constructed. Joshua Humphreys designed the frigates to be the young Navy's capital ships, and so Constitution and her sister ships were larger and more heavily armed and built than standard frigates of the period.

== See also ==
- American Revolution
- Edmund Hartt
- Joshua Humphreys
- Original six frigates of the United States Navy
