= USS Trumbull (1776) =

Frigate of the Continental Navy

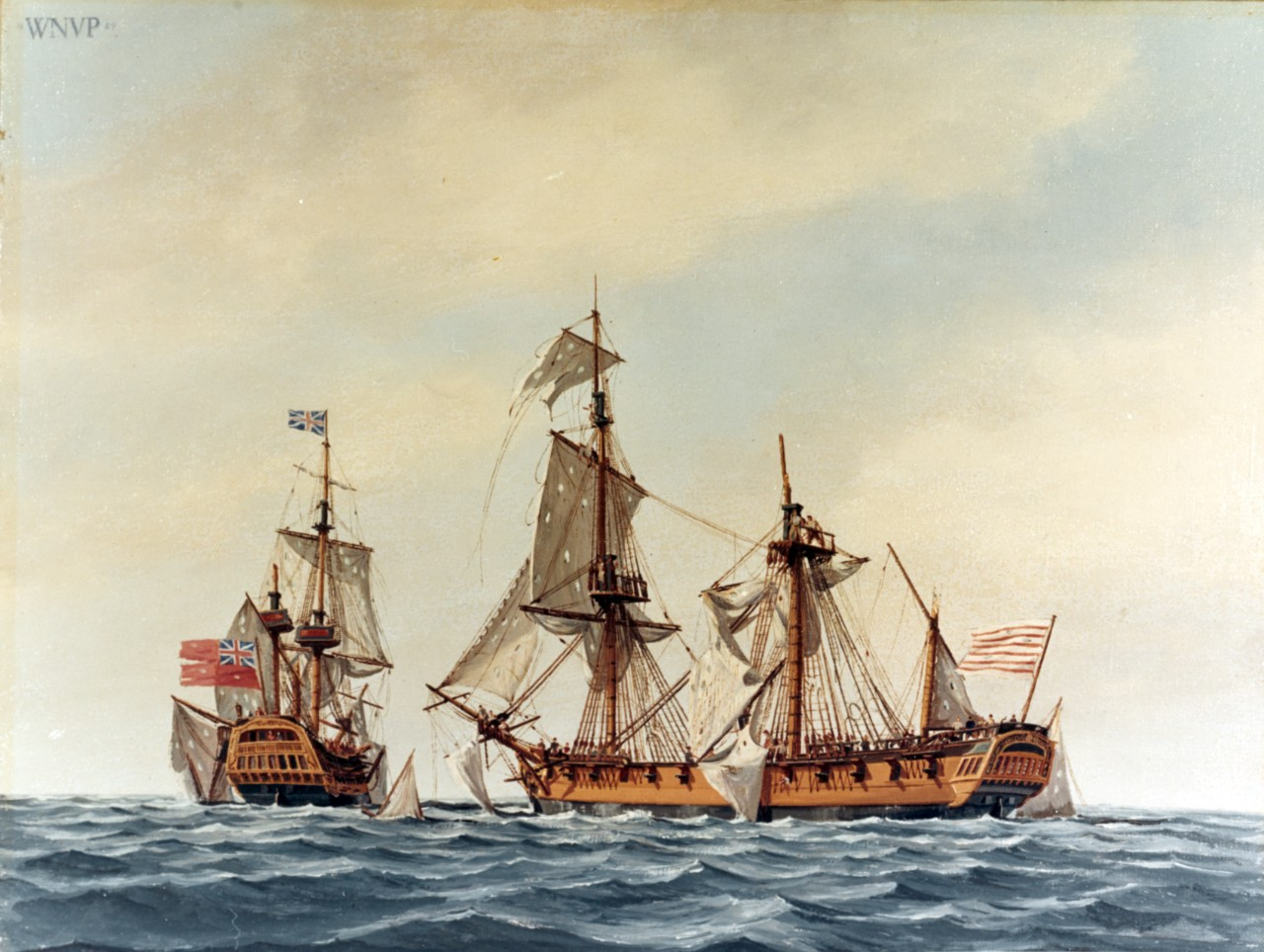
- Trumbull (right) engaging Watt

History

United States
- Name: USS Trumbull
- Builder: John Cotton, Chatham, Connecticut
- Laid down: March or April 1776
- Launched: 5 September 1776
- Commissioned: 1779
- Fate: Captured, 28 August 1781

General characteristics
- Type: Frigate
- Tons burthen: 700 tons
- Complement: 200
- Armament: 24 × 12-pounder guns; 6 × 6-pounder guns

Service record
- Commanders: Capt. James Nicholson

USS Trumbull was a 30-gun frigate of the Continental Navy. She was one of the thirteen frigates authorized by the Continental Congress on 13 December 1775. According to American sources, they were superior in design and construction to the same class of European vessels in their day. Its keel was laid down in March or April 1776 at Chatham, Connecticut, by John Cotton and was launched on 5 September 1776.

== Troubled launch ==
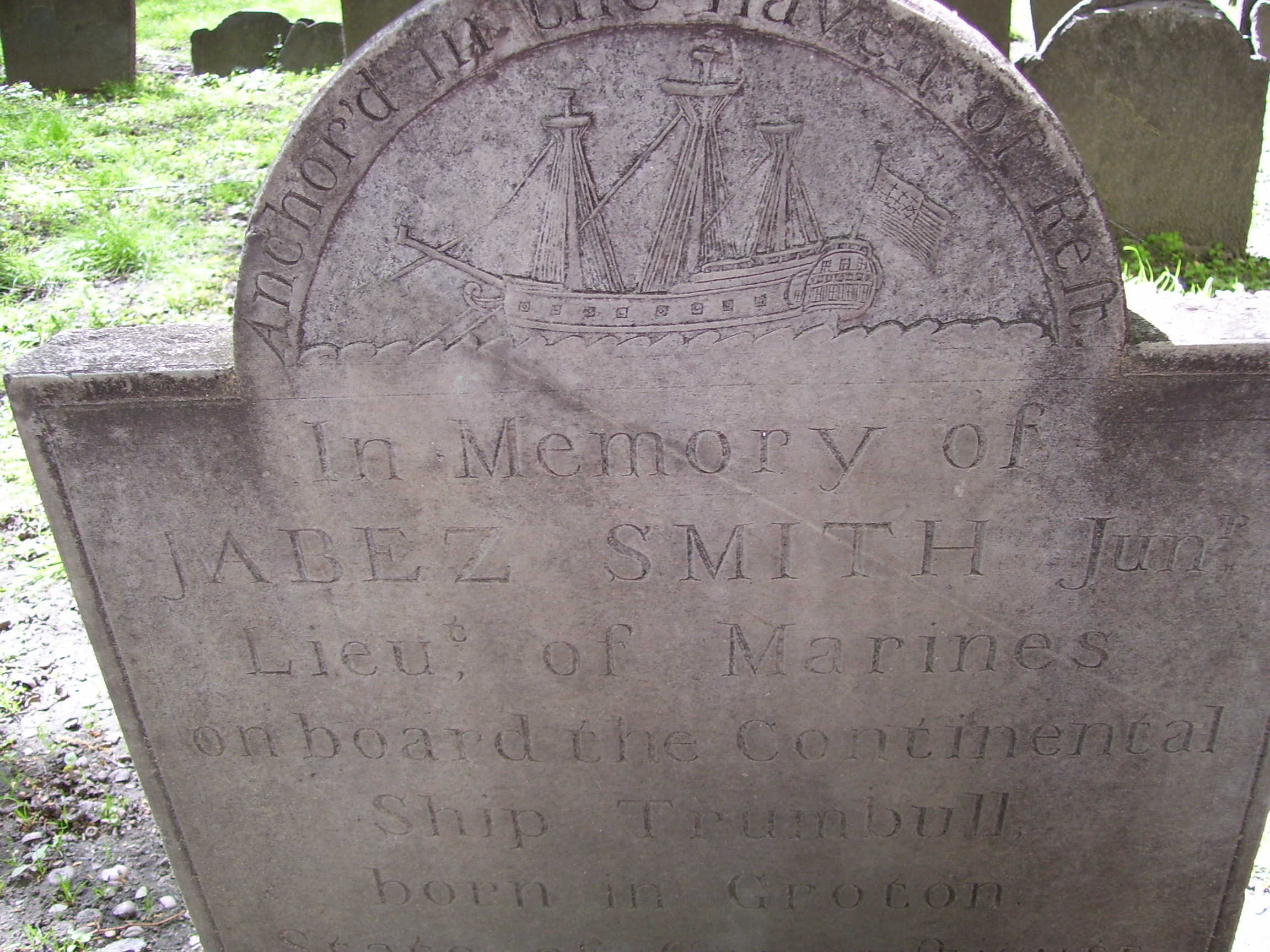
Trumbull depicted on the gravestone of Jabez Smith, a sailor killed onboard the ship and buried in the Granary Burying Ground

After the frigate had been launched, her builders discovered that her deep draft would make it extremely difficult to get the ship across the bar at the mouth of the Connecticut River into Long Island Sound. The following spring, as Trumbull lay in the river at Saybrook awaiting assistance in getting out to deep water, her safety became a matter of great concern to Continental naval authorities. In April General Howe ordered General Tryon — the Royal Governor of New York — to lead a raid into neighboring Connecticut. Tryon's forces landed at Fairfield, Connecticut, marched inland, and burned Continental public stores at Danbury, Connecticut. A small force of Americans harassed the British troops as they marched back to their ships. Fortunately, Tryon did not attack the berth on the Connecticut River where Trumbull — protected by neither gun nor warships — lay virtually defenseless.

After three years of inactivity, Trumbull was finally freed in 1779. Capt. Elisha Hinman suggested that casks of water be lashed with stout ropes running beneath the keel, along the port and starboard sides. When the casks were pumped out, they rose and lifted the ship just enough so as to permit passage over the bar. Trumbull then was fitted out for sea at New London, Conn. under the direction of Nathaniel Shaw. On 20 September 1779, Capt. James Nicholson received command of the frigate.

== Combat action ==
Nicholson did not receive his cruising orders until the following spring. Late in May 1780, Trumbull sailed for her first foray into the Atlantic. Action was not long in coming. At 1030 on 1 June 1780, Trumbull's masthead lookout sighted a sail to windward. In order to remain undetected for as long as possible, the frigate furled her sails until 1130. Then, upon ascertaining the strange ship's size, Trumbull then made sail and tacked towards, what soon proved to be the British letter-of-marque Watt, of 32 guns.

Nicholson delivered a short exhortation to his men who "most chearfully (sic) decided to fight". By noon, Nicholson noted that his ship seemed to "greatly outsail" the enemy and determined to utilize this advantage by moving to windward of the enemy.

Watt challenged Trumbull, running up British colors and firing a warning shot. Trumbull, in order to keep her true identity cloaked until the last possible moment, also ran up the British colors. Watt's commanding officer, Capt. Coulthard, initially mistook Trumbull "for one of his Majesty's cruising frigates" but soon became suspicious of its movements and closed to windward. His suspicions were confirmed when Trumbull failed to respond to a "private signal".

The Watt gave "three cheers and a broadside" to commence what historian Gardner W. Allen considered "one of the hardest fought naval engagements of the war". Trumbull soon ran up Continental colors and returned the first broadside at a range of 80 yards (73 m). For two-and-a-half hours, the two ships traded shot in a fierce action. The range — never wider than 80 yards (73 m) (Note: Historian/author W.E.Griffis fixes the distance at 100 yards.) — most of the time was under 50 yards (46 m); and once the ships' yards nearly became locked together. Watt twice set the frigate aflame; Trumbull's shot caused fires on board Watt that proved impossible to extinguish until she had cut away much of her rigging. Most of the men in Watt's tops were either killed, or wounded, or driven below. The Trumbull lost 30 killed or wounded, including two Lieutenants.

The British ship's hull, rigging, and sails were shot to pieces. Holed below the waterline, the letter of marque took on water at an alarming rate, and her danger was compounded by the fact that the American guns had left her with only one operable pump. Trumbull fared little better. Captain of Marines Gilbert Saltonstall subsequently noted: "We were literally cut all to pieces; not a shroud, stay, brace, bowling, or other rigging standing. Our main top must mast shot away, our fore, main mizzen, and jigger masts gone by the board...".

Nicholson's crew lost eight killed and 31 wounded; Watt suffered 13 killed and 79 wounded. Both badly battered, Trumbull and Watt separated and retired. Nicholson eagerly wanted to continue to pursue his adversary until his officers convinced him that — even if he managed to repair his only surviving mast — the condition of his crew would not permit another engagement.

Trumbull weathered a gale while struggling back to Connecticut and reached Nantasket on 14 June, three days after Watt limped into New York. Nicholson subsequently reported that "was I to have my choice...I would sooner fight any two-and-thirty gun frigate...on the coast of America, then to fight that ship over again...".

== Return to Philadelphia ==
In the meantime, the Continental Board of Admiralty, after congratulating Nicholson on the "gallantry displayed in the defense" against Watt urged him to speed the outfitting of his ship for further service. Lack of money and scarcity of men combined to keep the frigate inactive at Philadelphia for the first part of the year 1781.

== Capture ==
On 8 August 1781, Trumbull — the last remaining frigate of the original 13 authorized by Congress in 1775 — eventually departed from the Delaware capes in company with a 24-gun privateer and a 14-gun letter-of-marque. Under their protection was a 28-ship merchant convoy. On 28 August 1781, lookouts on the American ships spotted three sails to the eastward; two tacking to give chase to the convoy.

At nightfall, a rain squall struck with terrific force and carried away Trumbull's fore-topmast and her main topgallant mast. Forced to run before the wind, the frigate separated from the convoy and their escorts, and soon found herself engaged with the British frigate HMS Iris (the former Continental frigate Hancock), and the 18-gun privateer General Monk (the former Continental privateer General Washington). Even with the "utmost exertion," the wrecked masts and sails could not be cleared away. Knowing he could not run, Nicholson decided to fight.

Trapped, Trumbull beat to quarters, but three-quarters of the crew failed to respond, and instead fled below. Undaunted, Nicholson gathered the remainder. For one hour and 35 minutes, Trumbull and Iris remained engaged; General Monk soon closed and entered the contest as well. "Seeing no prospect of escaping in this unequal contest," Nicholson later wrote, "I struck...". Eleven Americans were wounded and five killed during the engagement before Trumbull surrendered. Iris reported that she had lost one man killed and six wounded, while Trumbull had two men killed and 10 wounded.

Trumbull, by this point almost a wreck, was taken under tow by the victorious Iris to New York. However, because of her severe damage, the British did not take the frigate into the Royal Navy; and details of her subsequent career are lost or unknown.

== See also ==
- List of sailing frigates of the United States Navy
- Naval tactics in the Age of Sail
- Bibliography of early American naval history
