= USS Virginia (1776) =

History

United States
- Name: USS Virginia
- Laid down: 1776
- Launched: August 1776
- Commissioned: Early 1777
- Fate: Captured, 1778

Great Britain
- Name: HMS Virginia
- Acquired: 1778
- Fate: Condemned and sold, 1782

General characteristics
- Type: Frigate
- Tonnage: 681
- Length: 126 ft 4 in (38.51 m)
- Beam: 34 ft 4 in (10.46 m)
- Draft: 10 ft 6 in (3.20 m)
- Complement: 315
- Armament: 24 × 12-pounder (5.4 kg) guns; 6 × 4-pounder (1.8 kg) guns; 6 swivel guns

Service record
- Commanders: Capt. James Nicholson

USS Virginia was a 28-gun frigate of the Continental Navy. She was one of 13 frigates authorized by the Continental Congress on 13 December 1775, laid down in 1776 at Fells Point, Maryland, by George Wells, launched that August, and commissioned in the spring of 1777, Captain James Nicholson in command.

The newly commissioned frigate's first orders directed her to attempt a run through the strong British naval blockade at the mouth of Chesapeake Bay and then if successful, to head south to the West Indies and cruise in search of English merchantmen. However, her first sortie failed, as did four subsequent attempts to get to sea which she made in May, October, November, and December 1777. These successive failures frustrated Virginia's restive crew, and many deserted to join the numerous privateers scattered about the wharves of nearby Baltimore.

By early January 1778, the desertions had become so numerous that Virginia was unable to leave the docks. This situation prompted a series of ugly exchanges between Capt. Nicholson, his executive officer Lt. Joshua Barney, and the governor of Maryland Thomas Johnson. New recruits were finally procured through the auspices of the Maritime Committee of the Continental Congress, enabling Virginia to attempt another run past the blockade in mid-January. This latest dash went smoothly until Emerald sighted Virginia near the Chesapeake capes. The British frigate pursued the Americans back towards Baltimore. Virginia tied up behind a water battery and chain stretched across the northwest branch of the Patapsco River, Md., between Whetstone Point and later Lazaretto Point, where she took on board 20 more seamen.

Later that month, when Capt. Nicholson again tried to run the blockade, he sent Lt. Barney ahead in the schooner Dolphin to reconnoiter the positions of the British warships. Dolphin sighted a large patrol vessel in Tangier Sound but outran her. Before meeting with Virginia, the schooner recaptured a Baltimore sloop taken earlier. On the basis of Lt. Barney's report, Capt. Nicholson decided to abandon this latest attempt to get to sea and returned to Baltimore.

Virginia lay at anchor at Baltimore for two months repairing and reprovisioning. During this time, Barney was dispatched to York, Pennsylvania, to explain Virginia's predicament to the Maritime Committee; and he returned in March with orders to make another attempt to get by the British as soon as possible. Awaiting Barney upon his arrival back in Baltimore were a letter of thanks from the Royal Navy for his kind treatment of Dolphin's prisoners and a large English cheese.

Virginia left Baltimore late in March in obedience to the Maritime Committee's orders. Nicholson's plans called for Virginia to sail first to Annapolis, to pick up a bay pilot promised by Governor Johnson. Completing this, the frigate and pilot vessel weighed anchor off Annapolis on 30 March and proceeded down the bay, plotting a night passage into the Atlantic. However, early on the morning of 31 March, Virginia grounded with a tremendous crash on the so-called Middle Ground between the capes, opposite the city of Hampton, Virginia. With a strong wind blowing astern, the surf pounded the frigate and forced her over. Her rudder snapped before she could be cleared and was soon lost. Once in the channel, Virginia was anchored and repairs begun.

At dawn, lookouts spotted Emerald and her fellow frigate Conqueror approaching from seaward though Virginia's guns remained undamaged, Capt. Nicholson ordered his barge broken out and went ashore with the ship's papers. Later that morning, the American frigate surrendered to Capt. Caldwell of Emerald. A Congressional court of inquiry into the fiasco cleared Capt. Nicholson of blame, and all the officers of the unlucky frigate saw action later during the Revolution.

Virginia herself was soon repaired and eventually purchased by the Royal Navy for use as the 32-gun frigate HMS Virginia. She was placed in service along the American coast and participated in the Penobscot Expedition of 1779, capturing, with HMS Blonde, the privateer "Hampden". Later participated in the capture of Charles Town, South Carolina in 1780. At the end of the war she was condemned and sold.
