= William Clark (Anglican priest) =

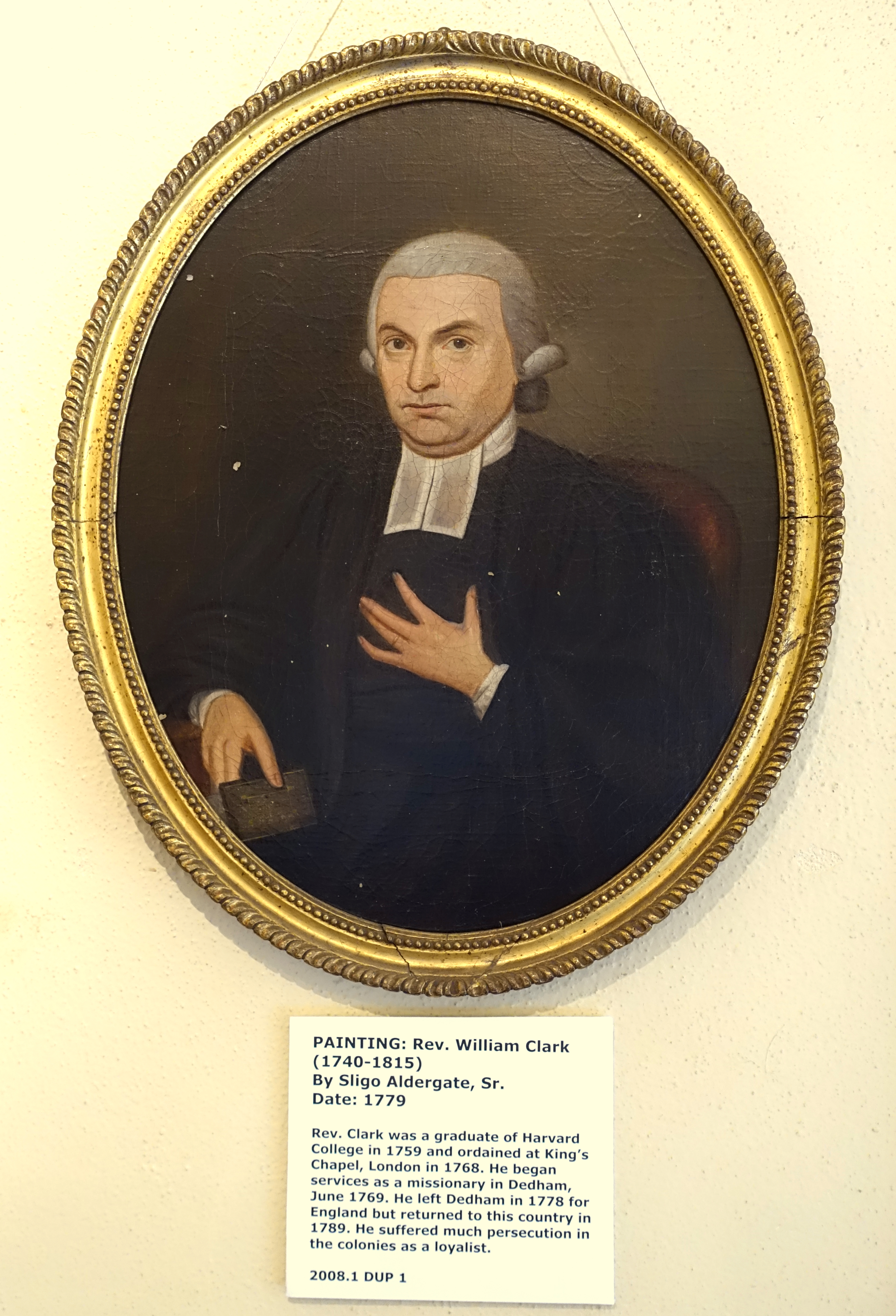
Rev. William Clark

Rev. William Clark was an Anglican priest from Massachusetts.

Clark was the son of Rev. Peter of Danvers, Massachusetts. After he was graduated from Harvard College in 1759, he was an interim preacher in various congregational churches around Boston. Several years later, he announced his intention to convert to Anglicanism to the Episcopal Convention in Boston. He was then assigned as a reader to the congregations in Dedham and Stoughton, Massachusetts. After traveling to England for ordination, Clark returned to Dedham.

On May 26, 1770, Clark married Mary Richards. (Note: The daughter of Timothy Richards.) That same year, he commented with disdain on the republican sensibilities of Dedhamites. He found their notions of liberty to be more akin to licentiousness, and asked to be transferred to congregations in Georgetown, Maine or Annapolis, Nova Scotia, but was refused by the Society for the Propagation of the Gospel. The Society functioned as his employer, and paid £20 of his £50 salary.

As his territory stretched into Stoughton, he attempted to move there but the Dedham Selectmen declared him to be a non-resident and cut off his salary from the taxes his parishioners paid. Additionally, he found Stoughton to be inhabited by "a low, vulgar sort of people, and it is noted for its various kinds of vices."

In April 1776, the General Court ordered him to be arrested as a Tory, but he was never brought into custody. The people of Dedham stoned his church and then took it over for use as a military storehouse. From then on, Clark would secretly conduct services in his house.

By March 1777, Clark announced that he would cease preaching; such an action was easier to swallow than eliminating prayers for the king. On May 19, 1777, he was charged by the Board of Selectmen in Dedham of being a traitor to the American Revolution. Two days alter, on May 21, he was surrounded by a mob as he went home, but "escaped on my parole." The mob was upset that he had provided a letter of recommendation to a loyalist whom they had previously run out of town after stealing his farming utensils and other property.

Clark was arrested on June 5, 1777, and held for a day at the Woodward Tavern in a room with a picture of Oliver Cromwell. After being denied bail, he was brought to Boston to stand before a military tribunal. When his carriage broke, he was forced to walk several miles the rest of the way. His trial, he said, "was carried on in so near a resemblance to the Romish Inquisition." He was denied counsel and was not told what the evidence against him was.

Clark was nearly found not guilty, as the only thing he had done was to provide aide to a fellow man in distress. He refused to pledge allegiance to the Commonwealth, however, and so was sent onto a prison ship for 10 weeks. While there, his health suffered greatly. He was released on a £500 bond and prohibited from traveling more than one mile from his house. In June 1778, Fisher Ames obtained a pass for him and Clark was allowed to leave America.

Three years after the American Revolutionary War ended, Clark returned to Dedham. He tried to sue Nathaniel Smith to recover a debt from before the war, but both the lower court and the Supreme Judicial Court rejected his claim, likely because he was a Tory. They also ordered him to pay Smith's legal fees and charged Ames, his attorney, with a ten pound fee as well.

Clark was deaf, and could only tell when the congregation was done singing by the way they put down the books after each hymn.

== Works cited ==
- Dedham Historical Society (2001). Images of America:Dedham. Arcadia Publishing. ISBN 978-0-7385-0944-0.
- Hanson, Robert Brand (1976). Dedham, Massachusetts, 1635-1890. Dedham Historical Society.
- Hurd, Duane Hamilton (1884). History of Norfolk County, Massachusetts: With Biographical Sketches of Many of Its Pioneers and Prominent Men. J. W. Lewis & Company.
- Knudsen, Harold M. (2025). Fisher Ames, Christian Founding Father & Federalist. Liberty Hill Publishing.
- Worthington, Erastus (1827). The History of Dedham: From the Beginning of Its Settlement, in September 1635, to May 1827. Dutton and Wentworth.
