= St. Paul's Church (Dedham, Massachusetts) =

Episcopal church in Massachusetts, US

Coordinates: 42°14′49.5″N 71°10′41″W

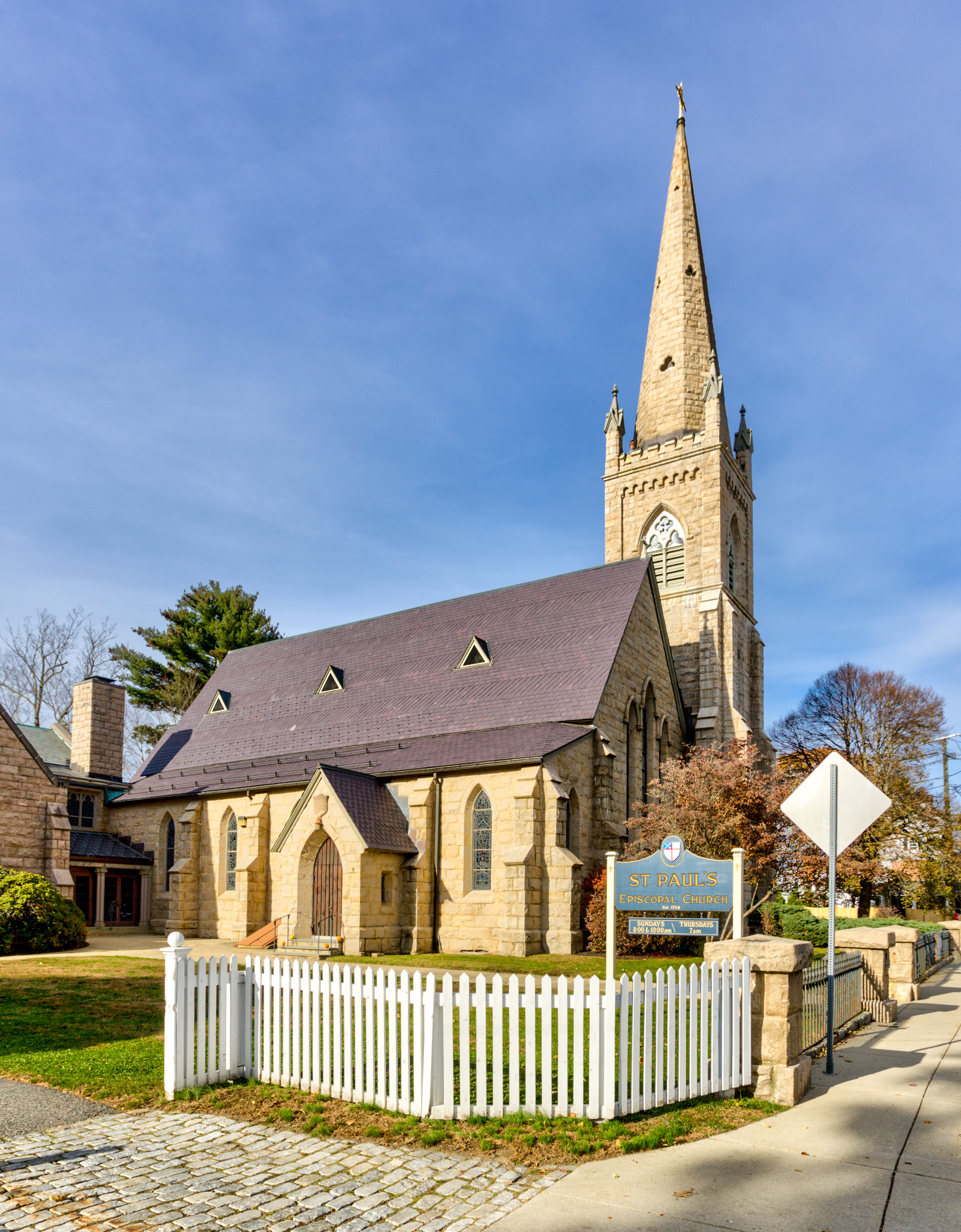
St. Paul's Church

St. Paul's Church is an Episcopal Church in Dedham, Massachusetts.

The church reported 469 members in 2015 and 474 members in 2023; no membership statistics were reported in 2024 parochial reports. Plate and pledge income reported for the congregation in 2024 was $368,725 with average Sunday attendance (ASA) of 80 persons.

== History ==
A group of Anglicans began meeting in Clapboardtrees in 1731.

For a time, the church's rectory was 45 Court Street, a house built by Jabez Chickering.

=== Colburn grant ===
Samuel Colburn (Note: Colburn was a descendant of Nathaniel Colburn and John Hunting.) died in the Crown Point Expedition of 1756. Though he was not an Anglican, he left almost his entire estate to the Anglican community in Dedham to establish St. Paul's Church. The grant, consisting of 135 acres of land and other cash and property, was hindered only by a life estate left to his mother. Some of the eight parcels were on the outskirts of town, along Mother Brook or up in Sandy Valley, but most were centered around modern day Dedham Square, including 369 Washington Street. The main portion ran from Maple Place to Dwight's Brook, and 10 acres bounded by High, Court, and School streets.

When Colburn's mother died in 1792, Montague began laying out streets and house lots on the property. The first street Montague laid out, modern day Church Street, (Note: It was known at the time as New Street.) was the first street in Dedham to be laid out with house lots on either side, as opposed to simply being a road to connect one farm to another. Norfolk Street was next, followed by School street. (Note: Norfolk Street was originally known as Cross Street, and School Street was originally Back Street.) Montague rented out the parcels in 999 year leases. One lessee, Samuel Richards, hired Charles Bulfinch to design his house on the corner of Highland and Court Streets.

=== Music ===
A new organ was installed in the church in 1795, and a Mr. Berkenhead performed a recital to mark the occasion. Montague preached on the occasion.

William H. Mann was the organist in both the 1797 church and in the 1845 church until it burned down. (Note: Mann lived on Court Street. He also played at the First Church and Parish in Dedham and at the Baptist Church in East Dedham. He learned the trade of a printer and in his later years he was a bookkeeper at the Maverick Woolen Mills.) John H.B. Thayer then left the brand new organ at the Allin Congregational Church in 1858 to play at St. Paul's. (Note: Thayer was the son of postmaster Elisha Thayer and a cashier at the Dedham Bank.) He held the position until his death in 1873.

The current Casavant Frères Opus 2545 is a 2-manual 39-rank pipe organ built in 1959. The 2,106-pipe instrument was rebuilt and expanded in 2016 with a new console, control system, and digital voices by Marshall and Ogletree.

== Churches ==
=== 1758 building ===
The first church, a simply structure measuring 30' by 40', was built on Court Street in 1758 diagonally across from where the current church stands. It was built by a Mr. Durpee. When the main beam of the church was raised, it broke causing 12 men to fall. None were injured. It was dedicated in 1761, but it wasn't complete until 1771 when it was plastered and permanent seats were installed. When Norfolk County was established in 1792, the congregation offered their building for use of the courts, but it was in such poor condition that the county declined.

The people of Dedham stoned the church during the American Revolution and then took it over for use as a military storehouse. From then on, Rev. William Clark would secretly conduct services in his house.

=== 1797 building ===
The congregation attempted to move the church to Franklin Square in 1797, but the entire structure collapsed, sending a cauldron of bats out of the belfry. It was reconstructed in that location in 1798 using various portions of an abandoned church in Stoughton.

In 1845, Comfort Weatherbee was commissioned to demolish the church. All the boarding was removed and a capstan was used to pull the frame and tower down.

=== 1845 building ===
The builders of the 1845 church, Thomas and Nathan Phillips, were from Dedham. Designed by Arthur Gilman after Magdalen College, Oxford, it was consecrated on Court Street in 1845 but burned down in 1856. The bell from the 1797 church hung in the tower for three or four years, but was eventually replaced with a rich toned bell. The old bell, which was small enough for neighborhood boys to pick up and chime, was then placed on the ground next to the tower for a few weeks before removal.

=== 1858 building ===
The present church was built in 1858 at the corner of Court Street and Village Ave. It was 90' long and the bell tower, made of granite and added in 1869, is 100' high. Designed by Arthur Gilman, it is made of Dedham Granite. It is located on the National Register of Historic Places as part of the Dedham Village Historic District.

Inside the tower is a 10-bell, manually operated carillon, with a bell donated by Ira Cleveland. It first rang on Easter Sunday, 1863 and during the COVID-19 lockdowns the bells rang every day at noon as a message of comfort.

In 2024 a capital campaign was begun to raise $1.5 million to repair damage to the tower. It had been determined that making repairs, including filling 60' tall cracks, would cost less than removing either the tower or spire. Repairs included 11 tons of steel, restitching cement separation areas, rebuilding buttresses, and repointing the facade. The completed renovations were dedicated in a celebration led by Bishop Julia Whitworth on November 2, 2025.

=== Chapel ===
A chapel was built with a bequest from George E. Hutton. As of 2001, it is a nursery school.

=== Good Shepherd ===
Lay readers from the church began ministering to Episcopalians in the Oakdale section of town in 1873 who could not get to the church easily. Out of their efforts grew the Church of the Good Shepherd, which was dedicated in 1876. One of the early members was William B. Gould.

== Ministers ==
Name of Minister	Years of service	Notes
William Clark	1760–1777	
William Montague	1794–1815	
Samuel B. Babcock	1834–1873	
Thomas Huntington Chappell	1937--1947	
Rudolph Roell	1947--1973	
Blayney Colmore	1973--1987	
Walter Earl Mullins	1988--1992	
Edward G. Rice	1994--2004	
Michael G. Hodges	2005--2014	
Melanie McCarley	2016–2026	

The first minister, Rev. William Clark, held controversial Tory views. By March 1777, Clark announced that he would cease preaching; such an action was easier to swallow than eliminating prayers for the king. Two months later, he was charged by the Board of Selectmen in Dedham of being a traitor to the American Revolution.

After being denied bail, he was brought to Boston to stand before a military tribunal. He refused to pledge allegiance to the Commonwealth, and so was sent onto a prison ship for 10 weeks. In June 1778, Fisher Ames obtained a pass for him and Clark was allowed to leave America.

In 1791, the congregation regrouped and called William Montague away from Old North Church. Montague received a salary of £100 sterling. He remained in the Dedham church until 1818. (Note: Burgess has his departure as being in 1815.)

Samuel B. Babcock served as rector in three buildings from 1834 to 1873.

== Burials ==
When Bishop Alexander Viets Griswold died in 1843, he was interred in Trinity Church on Summer Street in Boston. In 1876, the bodies of Griswald and his family were removed to the churchyard outside St. Paul's. Bishop Manton Eastburn is also buried outside the church.

Poet Anne Sexton's funeral was held at the church.

== Works cited ==
- Burgess, Ebenezer (1840). Dedham Pulpit: Or, Sermons by the Pastors of the First Church in Dedham in the XVIIth and XVIIIth Centuries. Perkins & Marvin.
- Clarke, Wm. Horatio (1903). Mid-Century Memories of Dedham. Dedham Historical Society.
- Dedham Historical Society (2001). Images of America: Dedham. Arcadia Publishing. ISBN 978-0-7385-0944-0.
- Hanson, Robert Brand (1976). Dedham, Massachusetts, 1635-1890. Dedham Historical Society.
- Hurd, Duane Hamilton (1884). History of Norfolk County, Massachusetts: With Biographical Sketches of Many of Its Pioneers and Prominent Men. J. W. Lewis & Company.
- Knudsen, Harold M. (2025). Fisher Ames, Christian Founding Father & Federalist. Liberty Hill Publishing.
- Neiswander, Judith (2024). Mother Brook and the Mills of East Dedham. Damianos Publishing. ISBN 978-1-941573-66-2.
- Parr, James L. (2009). Dedham: Historic and Heroic Tales From Shiretown. The History Press. ISBN 978-1-59629-750-0.
- Slafter, Carlos (1905). A Record of Education: The Schools and Teachers of Dedham, Massachusetts 1644-1904. Dedham Transcript Press. "1642-3."
- Worthington, Arthur Morton (1958). History of St. Paul's Episcopal Church in Dedham (PDF).
- Worthington, Erastus (1827). The History of Dedham: From the Beginning of Its Settlement, in September 1635, to May 1827. Dutton and Wentworth. pp. 106–107.
