= William Nicholson (U.S. Navy officer) =

Officer of the United States Navy

William Carmichael Nicholson
- Born: Maryland
- Military career
- Allegiance: United States
- Branch: United States Navy
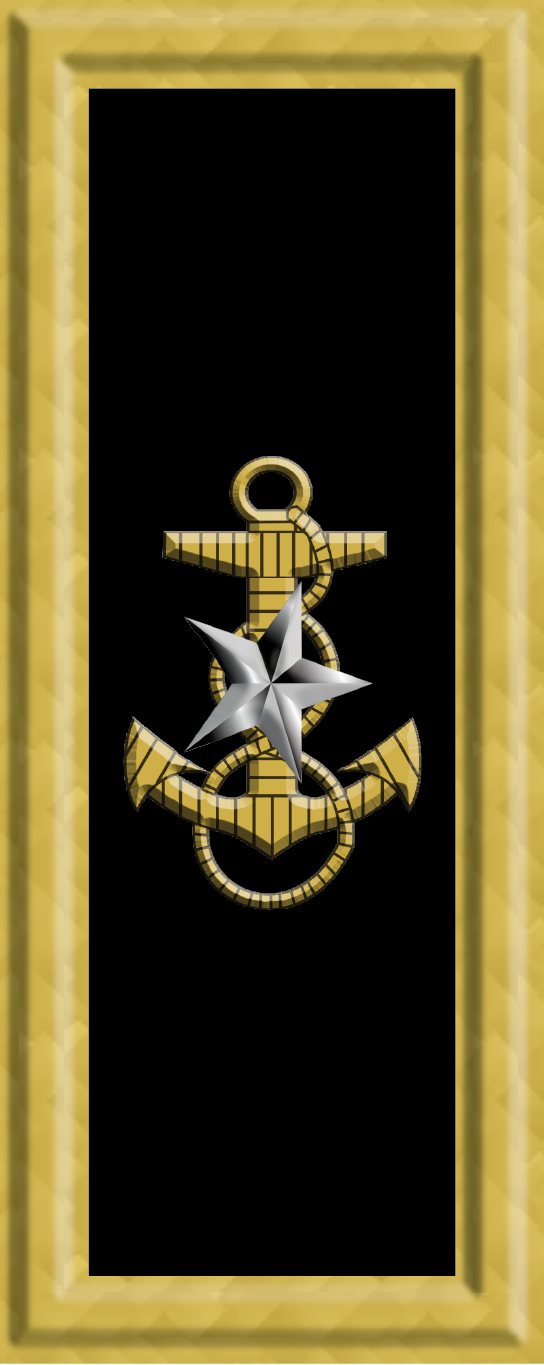
- Rank: Commodore
- Units: USS President
- Commands: USS Roanoke
- Conflicts: War of 1812; American Civil War
- Awards: Medal of Honor

Coat of Arms of John Nicholson

William Carmichael Nicholson (ca. 1790 – 25 July 1872) was an officer in the United States Navy during the War of 1812 and the Civil War.

A native of Maryland, Nicholson was the son of naval officer John Nicholson. He entered as a midshipman in 1812 and served on the USS President under Stephen Decatur during the War of 1812.

Commissioned captain in 1855, he commanded steam frigate USS Roanoke from May 1861. Appointed Commodore on the retired list in July 1862, he served a year on the Retiring Board. He died at the Philadelphia Naval Asylum at the age of approximately eighty.

== Namesake ==
The ships named USS Nicholson were named for him, his father, his uncles, James Nicholson and Samuel Nicholson, and his cousin, James W. Nicholson.
