= John Nicholson (naval officer) =

John Nicholson (1756 – 1844) was an officer in the Continental Navy during the American Revolutionary War.

Coat of Arms of John Nicholson

The son of Joseph and Hannah Scott Nicholson, he was born in Chestertown, Maryland. John Nicholson entered the Continental Navy as Lieutenant in October 1776 and the next month was promoted to Captain to command sloop Hornet.

After the war, he was elected as a member of The Society of the Cincinnati in the state of Maryland in 1786. He was active in public affairs for many years in Maryland, where he died in the summer of 1844.

The ships named USS Nicholson were named for him, his older brothers, James Nicholson and Samuel Nicholson, his son, William Nicholson and his grandnephew, James W. Nicholson.
