= James Nicholson (naval officer) =

American naval officer (1737–1804)

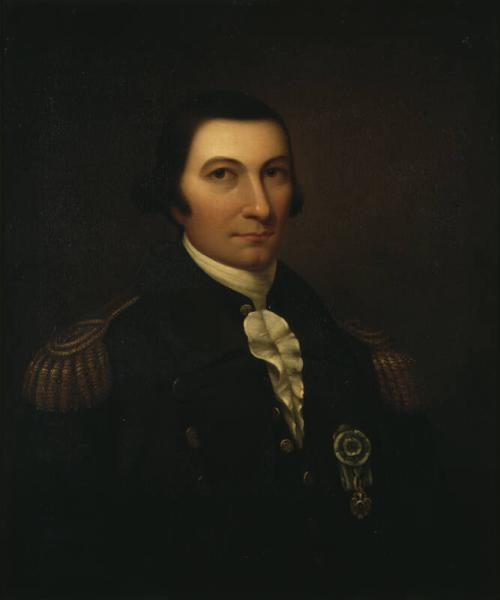
- Born: 1737; Chestertown, Maryland, British America
- Died: September 2, 1804; New York City, U.S.
- Relatives: John Nicholson (brother); Samuel Nicholson (brother); William Nicholson (nephew); Rear Admiral James Nicholson (grand-nephew)
- Military career
- Allegiance: Great Britain; United States
- Branch: Royal Navy; Continental Navy
- Rank: Senior captain
- Commands: USS Virginia and USS Trumbull
- Conflicts: American Revolutionary War; Blockade of Baltimore; Battle of Trenton

James Nicholson (1737 – 2 September 1804) was an officer in the Continental Navy during the American Revolutionary War.

== Early life ==
Nicholson was born in 1737 in Chesterown, Province of Maryland, into the prestigious colonial Nicholson family of Maryland, a son of Joseph Nicholson (1709–1787) and Hannah (née Smyth) Nicholson (1708–1767). Among his siblings were younger brothers Samuel and John Nicholson, who were also officers in the Continental Navy during the Revolutionary War He was also uncle to William Nicholson, an officer in the United States Navy during the War of 1812 and the American Civil War and grand-uncle to Rear Admiral James Nicholson, an officer in the U.S. Navy during the Mexican–American War and the Civil War.

== Career ==
Nicholson began his career by serving in the colonial Navy with the British in the assault on Havana in 1762, and was commissioned Captain in the Continental Navy 10 October 1776. He commanded Defense, Trumbull, and Virginia, and when blockaded at Baltimore, Maryland, took his men to join George Washington at the Battle of Trenton to aid in that key victory.

Made the senior captain in the Continental Navy due to political influence, he nevertheless had an undistinguished career, never winning a victory or capturing a prize. He lost his first command, the frigate Virginia, while trying to run past the British squadron blockading the mouth of the Chesapeake Bay. He ran the ship aground and rather than fight the approaching British ships, fled to shore in a boat, leaving the Virginia and her crew to be captured. The next day he approached the captured ship under a flag of truce and asked for his personal effects.

Nicholson styled his flight as an "escape" in his report to Congress, and with the only witnesses confined to British prisons, he was eventually given command of Trumbull. That command he lost to HMS Iris when his crew refused to fight.

=== Later career ===
After the War, Nicholson moved to New York City and became a United States Commissioner of Loans. His home there became a meeting place for New York Democratic-Republican politicians, including followers of Thomas Jefferson and Aaron Burr. Nicholson greatly opposed Josiah Ogden Hoffman, including in relation to the Jay Treaty, and Alexander Hamilton, who challenged him to a duel in 1795, and his policies.

On July 4, 1788, Nicholson was invited to attend the Society of Cincinnati as a member and at the meeting, naval officers of similar rank were determined to be entitled to be members of the New York Society.

== Personal life ==
Coat of Arms of James Nicholson

In 1763, Nicholson was married to Frances Witter (1744–1832), the daughter of Mary (née Lewis) Witter and Thomas Witter. Witter's father Thomas was born in Bermuda and became a successful merchant in New York. Together, they were the parents of six children, one son and five daughters, including:

- Catherine "Kitty" Nicholson (1764–1854), who married William Few Jr., a signer of the Declaration of Independence and U.S. Senator from Georgia.
- Hannah Nicholson (1766–1849), who married Albert Gallatin, a U.S. Senator, U.S. Representative, Secretary of the Treasury, and U.S. Minister to France and the United Kingdom.
- Frances "Fanny" Nicholson (1771–1851), who married Joshua Seney, a U.S. Representative from Maryland.
- James Witter Nicholson (1773–1851), who married Ann Griffin, daughter of Isaac Griffin, a U.S. Representative from Pennsylvania.
- Maria Nicholson (1775–1868), who married John Montgomery, a U.S. Representative and Attorney General of Maryland.
- Jehoiadden Nicholson (1783–1828), who married James Chrystie.

Nicholson died on September 2, 1804, at his home in New York City. He was buried at Trinity Church in lower Manhattan.

=== Legacy ===
The ships named USS Nicholson were named for him, his younger brothers, John Nicholson and Samuel Nicholson, his nephew, William Nicholson and his grandnephew, James W. Nicholson.

The town of Nicholson Township, Fayette County, Pennsylvania was named in honor of Nicholson's son, James Witter Nicholson.
