= Samuel Nicholson =

American naval officer (1743–1811)

- Portrait attributed to Christian Gullager, c. 1790–1799
- Born: 1743; Chestertown, Maryland
- Died: December 28, 1811 (aged 68); Charlestown, Massachusetts
- Occupation: Naval officer
- Known for: military service in the American Revolutionary War, also as overseer of construction of USS Constitution ("Old Ironsides") and as that ship's first commander

Samuel Nicholson (1743 – December 28, 1811) was an officer in the Continental Navy during the American Revolutionary War and later in the United States Navy. Along with shipwright George Claghorn he oversaw the building of USS Constitution ("Old Ironsides"), and Nicholson was that ship's first commander.

== Personal life ==
The son of Joseph and Hannah Scott Nicholson, Samuel Nicholson was born in Chestertown, Maryland. He married Mary Dowse, sister of Edward Dowse, on February 9, 1780, and had "a large family of children". They lived in Dedham, Massachusetts, and at least three of their daughters were baptized in the Episcopal Church there. During the construction of the Constitution, Nicholson, former Congressman Fisher Ames, and others tried to get President John Adams to appoint Rev. William Montague, the church's rector, as the chaplain.

== Service in American Revolution ==
Nicholson was a captain in the Continental Navy. He served as a lieutenant aboard Bonhomme Richard under John Paul Jones who at the time was commander of Deane, which was used to capture three British sloops-of-war. Nicholson also commanded Dolphin in 1776.

== Post revolution service ==
By the time the American Revolution was finally won there were few ships to speak of in the young American Navy. The navy, like the army, was largely disbanded, with many naval vessels being sold or turned into merchantman vessels. Now that America had won its independence it no longer had the protection of the British navy and had to defend its own interests abroad. The idea of an American Navy was the subject of much debate between the Federalists who favored a strong navy and the anti-federalists who felt the money required for a navy would be better spent elsewhere. However the repeated threats from France and the Barbary states of North Africa had given cause to now consider resorting to more forceful measures to procure the security of American shipping interests.

== First commander of USS Constitution ==
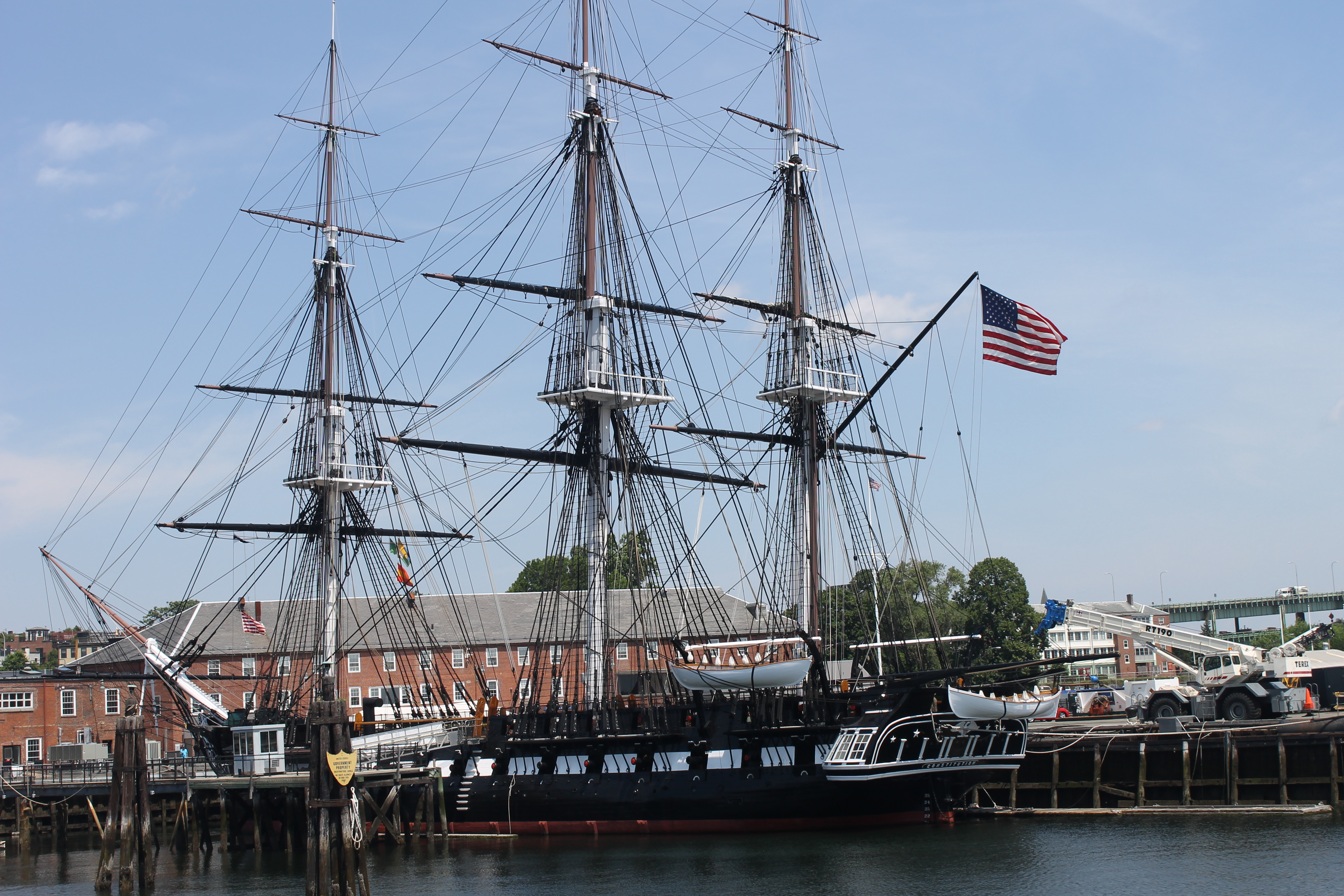
Old Ironsides in Boston Harbor – 2014

USS Constitution was one of six frigates authorized by act of Congress which was approved on March 27, 1794. Nicholson was commissioned as one of the first six captains in the reborn United States Navy on June 10, 1794.

The vessel was designed by Joshua Humphreys, and built at Hartt's Shipyard in Boston, Massachusetts, under the supervision of master shipwright George Claghorn. Nicholson was the naval inspector who also oversaw her construction.

Upon her completion Constitution was launched at Boston on September 27, 1797, under the command of Nicholson. His first Lieutenant was Charles Russel. Upon her completion Constitution was launched at Boston on September 27, 1797, under the command of Nicholson. His 1st Lieutenant was Charles Russel. President John Adams ordered all Navy ships to sea in late May 1798 to patrol for armed ships of France, and to free any American ship captured by them. Constitution was still not ready to sail, and eventually had to borrow sixteen 18-pound (8.2 kg) cannons from Castle Island before finally being ready.

Constitution put to sea on the evening of 22 July 1798, commanded by Captain Nicholson, with orders to patrol the Eastern seaboard between New Hampshire and New York. A month later she was patrolling between Chesapeake Bay and Savannah, Georgia, when Nicholson found his first opportunity for capturing a prize: off the coast of Charleston, South Carolina, on 8 September, she intercepted Niger, a 24-gun ship sailing with a French crew en route from Jamaica to Philadelphia, claiming to have been under the orders of Great Britain. Perhaps not understanding his orders correctly, Nicholson had the crewmen imprisoned, placed a prize crew aboard Niger, and brought her into Norfolk, Virginia. Constitution sailed south again a week later to escort a merchant convoy, but her bowsprit was severely damaged in a gale; she returned to Boston for repairs. In the meantime, Secretary of the Navy Benjamin Stoddert determined that Niger had been operating under the orders of Great Britain as claimed, and the ship and her crew were released to continue their voyage. The American government paid a restitution of $11,000 to Great Britain.

After departing from Boston on 29 December, Nicholson reported to Commodore John Barry, who was flying his flag in United States, near the island of Dominica for patrols in the West Indies. On 15 January 1799, Constitution intercepted the English merchantman Spencer, which had been taken prize by the French frigate L'Insurgente a few days prior. Technically, Spencer was a French ship operated by a French prize crew; but Nicholson, perhaps hesitant after the affair with Niger, released the ship and her crew the next morning.

Upon joining Barry's command, Constitution almost immediately had to put in for repairs to her rigging due to storm damage, and it was not until 1 March that anything of note occurred. On this date, she encountered HMS Santa Margarita, the captain of which was an acquaintance of Nicholson. The two agreed to a sailing duel, which the English captain was confident he would win. But after 11 hours of sailing Santa Margarita lowered her sails and admitted defeat, paying off the bet with a cask of wine to Nicholson. (Note: Cooper, Hollis and Jennings attribute this encounter to the command of Silas Talbot some months later. However, Jennings uses Cooper as a reference and Martin presents a clear argument for attribution to Nicholson.)

Resuming her patrols, Constitution managed to recapture the American sloop Neutrality on 27 March and, a few days later, the French ship Carteret. Secretary Stoddert had other plans, however, and recalled Constitution to Boston. She arrived there on 14 May, and Nicholson was relieved of command.

== Later life ==
Coat of Arms of James W. Nicholson

Nicholson was an original member of the Society of the Cincinnati, and the first commandant of the Boston Navy Yard when it was established in 1800. He remained on active duty with the Navy for the remainder of his life. Nicholson died at Charlestown, Massachusetts in 1811, and is buried in the crypt of the Old North Church in Boston.

== Namesakes and honors ==
The U.S. Navy ships named USS Nicholson were named for him and other members of his family who served as naval officers: his elder brother, James Nicholson, his younger brother John Nicholson, his nephew, William Nicholson and his grandson James W. Nicholson.

== Bibliography ==
- Allen, Gardner Weld (1909). Our Naval War With France. Boston and New York: Houghton Mifflin. OCLC 1202325.
- Colledge, J. J.; Warlow, Ben (2006) [1969]. Ships of the Royal Navy: The Complete Record of All Fighting Ships of the Royal Navy from the 15th Century to the Present (3rd Rev ed.). London: Chatham Publishing. ISBN 978-1-86176-281-8. OCLC 67375475.
- Cooper, James Fenimore (1856). History of the navy of the United States of America.
  Stringer & Townsend, New York. OCLC 197401914. Url
- Hagan, Kenneth J. (1992). This People's Navy: The Making of American Sea Power.
  The Free Press, New York. ISBN 0-02-913471-4. Url
- Hollis, Ira N. (1900). The frigate Constitution the central figure of the Navy under sail.
  Houghton, Mifflin and Company, Boston and New York; The Riverside Press, Cambridge. Url
- Jennings, John (1966). Tattered Ensign The Story of America's Most Famous Fighting Frigate, U.S.S. Constitution. Thomas Y. Crowell. OCLC 1291484.
- Martin, Tyrone G. (1997). A Most Fortunate Ship: A Narrative History of "Old Ironsides". Naval Institute Press. ISBN 978-1-55750-588-0. OCLC 243901224.
- Winfield, Rif (2007). British Warships in the Age of Sail 1714–1792: Design, Construction, Careers and Fates. St. Paul: Seaforth / MBI. ISBN 978-1-84415-700-6. OCLC 216617748.
- Knudsen, Harold M. (2025). Fisher Ames, Christian Founding Father & Federalist. Liberty Hill Publishing.
