= James W. Nicholson =

United States Navy admiral (1821–1887)

James William Augustus Nicholson
- Born: March 10, 1821; Dedham, Massachusetts, U.S.
- Died: October 28, 1887 (aged 66); New York, U.S.
- Relatives: Samuel Nicholson (grandfather)
- Military career
- Allegiance: United States
- Branch: United States Navy
- Service years: 1838–1883
- Rank: Rear admiral
- Commands: Isaac Smith; Shamrock; Manhattan; Mohongo; European Squadron
- Conflicts: Mexican–American War; Opening of Japan; American Civil War; Egyptian Expedition

Rear Admiral James William Augustus Nicholson (10 March 1821 – 28 October 1887) was an officer in the United States Navy during the Mexican–American War and the American Civil War.

== Life and naval career ==
Coat of Arms of James W. Nicholson

The son of Nathaniel Nicholson and grandson of Samuel Nicholson, he was born in Dedham, Massachusetts. Nicholson entered the Navy as a midshipman in February 1838. As a Lieutenant, he served in Vandalia in Commodore Matthew C. Perry's Opening of Japan from 1853 to 1855.

During the Civil War he served in Pocahontas and Pensacola, and commanded the Isaac Smith, Shamrock, Manhattan, and Mohongo. In 1861, under the command of Percival Drayton in activities near Charleston, he was made supervisor of a colony of over 100 former slaves on Otter Island in December 1861.

He commanded the New York Navy Yard during 1876 to 1880.

As Commodore from August 1873, and Rear Admiral from October 1881, he commanded the European Squadron from 16 September 1881 to February 1883. When the British bombarded Alexandria, Egypt, in 1882, he rescued the records of the American Consulate and took American and other refugees aboard his flagship, Lancaster. Commendation from the Navy Department and awards of gratitude from European governments followed.

Nicholson retired on 10 March 1883 and died at his home in New York on 28 October 1887.

== Namesakes ==
The ships named USS Nicholson were named for him and four male relatives in the naval service.
