= Industrial Revolution in the United States =

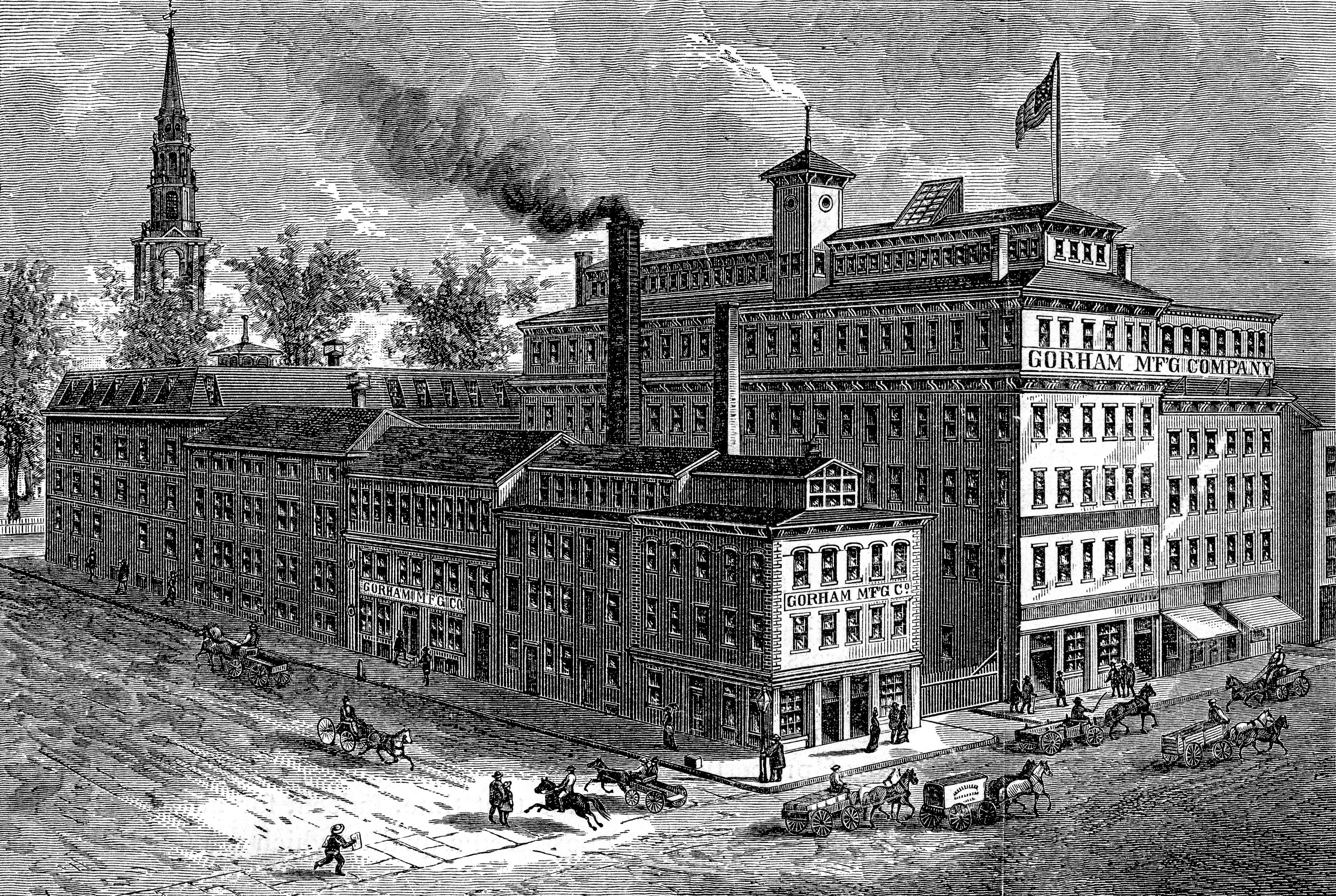
An 1866 engraving of the Gorham Manufacturing Company in Providence, Rhode Island

In the United States from the late 18th and 19th centuries, the Industrial Revolution affected the U.S. economy, progressing it from manual labor, farm labor and handicraft work to a greater degree of industrialization based on wage labour. There were many improvements in technology and manufacturing fundamentals with results that greatly improved overall production and economic growth in the U.S.

The Industrial Revolution occurred in two distinct phases: the First Industrial Revolution occurred during the later part of the 18th century through the first half of the 19th century and the Second Industrial Revolution advanced following the American Civil War. Among the main contributors to the First Industrial Revolution were Samuel Slater's introduction of British industrial methods in textile manufacturing to the United States, Eli Whitney's invention of the cotton gin, Éleuthère Irénée du Pont's improvements in chemistry and gunpowder making, and other industrial advancements necessitated by the War of 1812, and construction of the Erie Canal, which was built between 1817 and 1821.

== History ==
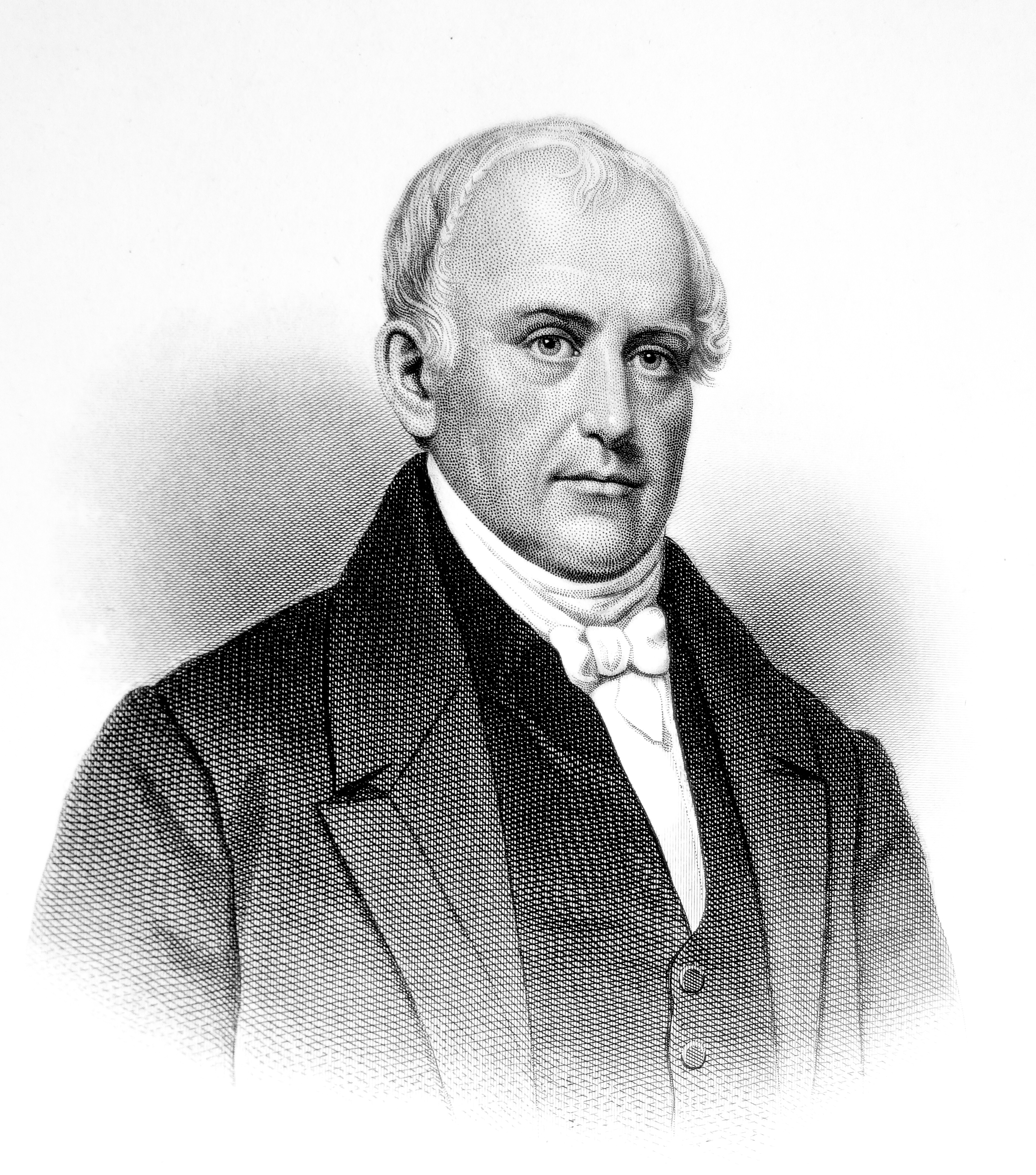
Industrialist Samuel Slater, who Andrew Jackson called "the father of the American Industrial Revolution"

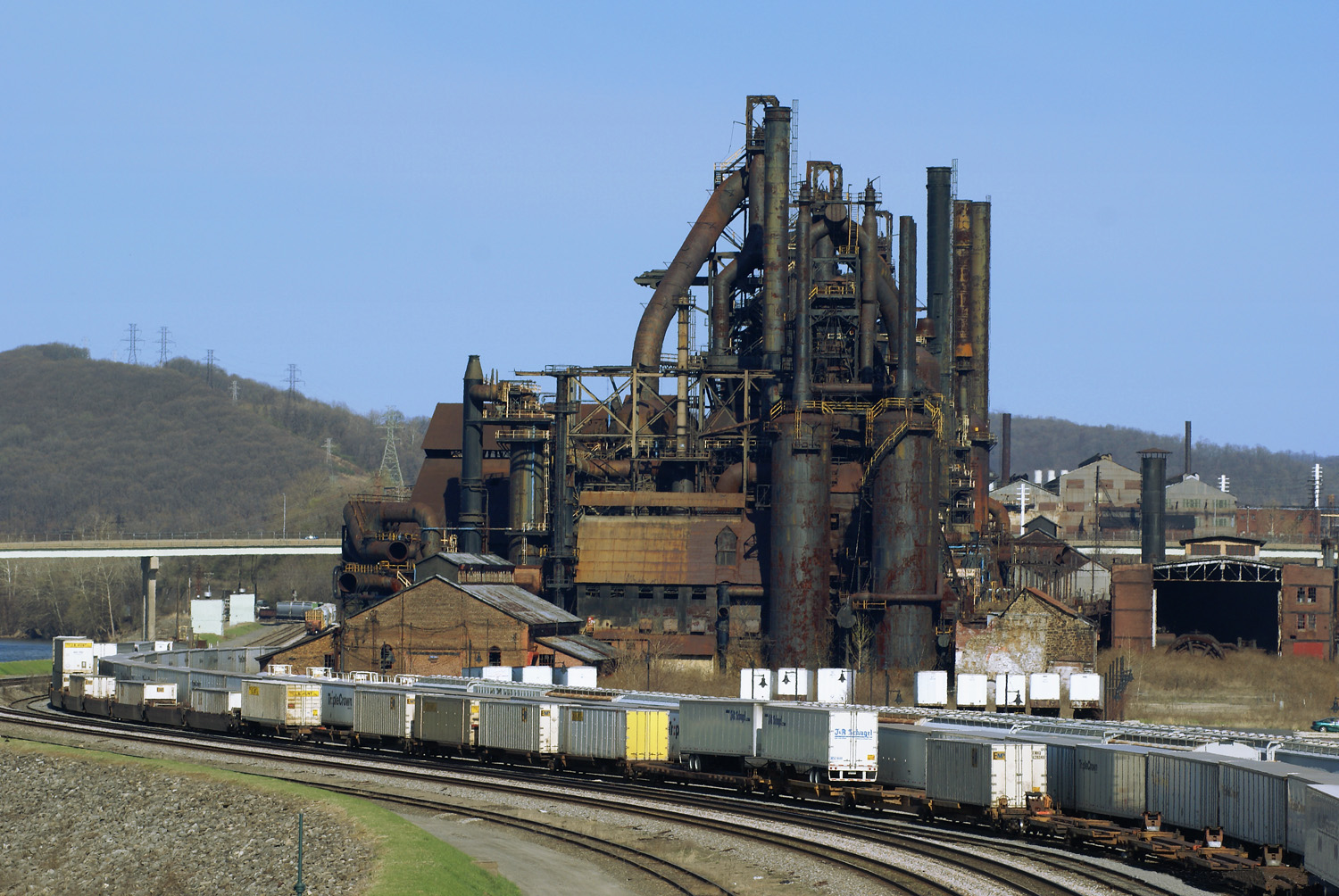
Bethlehem Steel in Bethlehem, Pennsylvania was one of the world's leading steel manufacturers for most of the 20th century until 1982 when it discontinued most of its operations. It subsequently declared bankruptcy in 2001 and was dissolved in 2003.

A textile mill in Winooski, Vermont

=== 18th century to the beginning of the 19th century ===
As the United Kingdom industrialized in the mid-to-late 18th century, the United States remained agrarian with resource processing, gristmills, and sawmills being the main industrial non-agrarian output. During the colonial period, Britain sought to keep the Thirteen Colonies from industrializing and becoming competitors, intending for the American colonies to remain agrarian backwaters, providing Britain with raw materials like indigo and cotton. Notably, William Pitt the Elder said in 1770 "the colonies should not be permitted to manufacture so much as a horseshoe nail". Some technologies that advanced the Industrial Revolution in the U.S. were appropriated from British designs by ambitious British entrepreneurs hoping to use the technology to create successful companies in the U.S.

In the fall of 1787, merchant George Cabot persuaded Thomas Somers and James Leonard, investors from England, to come to Beverly, Massachusetts. On April 22, 1788 it was reported by the Salem Mercury newspaper that the hardware of the Beverly Cotton Manufactory had been completed, including a spinning jenny, carding machine, warping machine, and other tools.

One entrepreneur who is most associated with starting up the textile industry in the U.S. and with bringing the textile technology to the U.S. was Samuel Slater. Slater learned that Americans were interested in textile techniques used in England, but since exporting such technical designs were illegal in England, he memorized as much as he could and departed for New York City. Moses Brown, a leading Rhode Island industrialist, secured the services of Slater, with Slater promising to recreate British textile designs. After an initial investment by Brown to fulfill initial requirements, the Slater Mill, the first water-powered roller spinning textile mill in America, was opened in 1793. By 1800, Slater's mill had been duplicated by many other entrepreneurs as Slater grew wealthier and his techniques became more popular, with Andrew Jackson calling Slater the "Father of the American Industrial Revolution". But Slater also earned the pejorative "Slater the Traitor" from many in Great Britain who felt he betrayed them in bringing British textile techniques to the Americas.

With the invention of the cotton gin by Eli Whitney in 1794, American slaveholders had the means to make cotton production significantly more profitable. The era of King Cotton was underway by the early 19th century to such an extent that by the mid-19th century, southern slave plantations supplied 75% of the world's cotton. The introduction of the cotton gin was as unexpected as it was unprecedented. British textiles had expanded with no change in ginning principles in centuries. For the American planter class, upfront costs were higher, but productivity improvement among their slaves were clear, and Whitney's original 1794 gin design was copied by many and improved upon.

In 1798, Whitney obtained a government contract to manufacture 10,000 muskets in less than two years. It was only in 1800, two years after the award of the contract (and before he had produced a single musket), that he began to express interest in the use of interchangeable parts, after Treasury Secretary Oliver Wolcott Jr. exposed him to the memoirs of Honoré Blanc, a French gunsmith who was a pioneer of the practice. By 1801, he had still not produced any muskets and was called to Washington to justify his use of treasury funds. There, he created a demonstration for Congress in which he assembled muskets from parts chosen randomly from his supply. While this demonstration was later proven to be pre-arranged and misleading, Whitney managed to complete the initial contract, and went on to produce another 15,000 muskets in the years that immediately followed. He also devoted time and energy to promoting the idea of interchangeability.

The du Pont family emigrated to the United States during the French Revolution, bringing with them expertise in chemistry and gunpowder. E.I. du Pont observed that the quality of American gunpowder was poor, and in 1802 he opened the Eleutherian Mills powder mill in Wilmington, Delaware. The mill served as home for du Pont's family as well as a center of business and social life, with employees living at or near the mill.

In the late 18th century, Robert Fulton of Pennsylvania proposed plans for steam-powered vessels to both the United States and British governments. Having developed significant technical knowledge in both France and Great Britain, Fulton returned to the United States, working with Robert R. Livingston to open the first commercially successful steamboat operating between New York City and Albany. Fulton built a steamboat sturdy enough to take down the Ohio and Mississippi rivers, he was an early member on a commission to plan the Erie Canal, and he designed the first working muscle-powered submarine, the Nautilus.

In 1784, Irish-American engineer Christopher Colles proposed a shorter version of what would become the Erie Canal: a canal along the Mohawk River in New York State, originating at Lake Ontario. Colles was acquainted with England's Bridgewater Canal from two decades earlier. Though there was interest in Colles' proposal and there were some initial efforts to implement it, it did not proceed further at that time.

In 1792, the Western and Northern Inland Lock Navigation Companies were created, and they initiated the process of constructing a longer canal between the Mohawk and Lake Ontario. Financial difficulties prevented it from making further progress.

=== Early to mid-19th century ===
==== Firearms and Gunpowder ====
By the 1820s, the use of interchangeable parts was well-established among American manufacturers of military-grade firearms; Congressional contracts stipulated this quality in muskets, rifles and pistols. Interchangeability of firearms parts at the U.S. armories, such as the Springfield Armory and Harpers Ferry Armory, was found to have been in use for a number of years by the time of the 1853 British Parliamentary Commissions Committee on Small Arms inquiry.

A critical factor in making interchangeable metal parts was the invention of several machine tools, such as the slide rest lathe, screw cutting lathe, turret lathe, milling machine and metal planer. One of the most important and versatile of these machine tools was David Wilkinson's lathe, for which he received a $10,000 award from the government of the United States.

In 1822, Thomas Blanchard invented a machine tool that streamlined the process of manufacturing gun barrels. He was employed by the Springfield Armory during its development. The machine turned and finished gun barrels in a single operation; the octagon portion of the barrel was finished by changing the action of the lathe to vibratory motion.

In the same period, he developed a copying lathe that traced a model to turn gun stocks, producing the desired contour automatically.

In order to spread knowledge of manufacturing techniques, the United States War Department made contractors open their shops to other manufacturers and competitors. The armories also openly shared manufacturing techniques with private industry. Additionally, the idea of interchangeability migrated from the armories to industry as machinists trained in the armory system were hired by other manufacturers. Skilled engineers and machinists thus influenced American clockmakers and sewing machine manufacturers Willcox & Gibbs and Wheeler & Wilson, who used interchangeable parts before 1860.

By the 1850s, the Hartford, Connecticut-based Colt's Patent Fire Arms Manufacturing Company was one of the world's largest and most innovative manufacturers of firearms. It was an early pioneer of assembly-line production. Its founder, Samuel Colt, established a second factory in London, England in 1853. Colt's presence in the British market caused years of acrimony and lawsuits among British arms makers, who doubted the validity of Colt's British patent and the desirability of the American system of manufacturing. It took many more years and a UK government commission before the point became universally accepted that such manufacture was possible and economical.

DuPont continued to grow rapidly and by the mid-19th century had become the largest supplier of gunpowder to the United States military.

==== Other Industries ====
After a trip to London in 1811 during which he memorized the design of power looms, Francis Cabot Lowell founded the Boston Manufacturing Company in 1813 along with other members of the so-called "Boston Associates". The company built its first mill next to the Charles River in Waltham, Massachusetts, in 1814. This water-powered mill was the first integrated spinning and weaving factory in the world. They used the power loom design that Cabot had memorized as well as trade secrets from the earlier horse-powered Beverly Cotton Manufactory. This was the largest factory in the U.S., with a workforce of about 300. It was a very efficient, highly profitable mill that, with the aid of the Tariff of 1816, competed effectively with British textiles at a time when many smaller operations were being forced out of business. In the three decades that followed, the Boston Associates would establish or improve mills in Lowell, Massachusetts, Manchester, New Hampshire, Saco, Maine, Chicopee, Massachusetts, Lawrence, Massachusetts, and other locations.

Obed Hussey in Ohio patented a reaper in 1833, the Hussey reaper. Made in Baltimore, Maryland, Hussey's design was a major improvement in reaping efficiency. The new reaper only required two horses working in a non-strenuous manner, a man to work the machine, and another person to drive. In addition, the Hussey reaper left an even and clean surface after its use. The McCormick reaper was patented by Cyrus McCormick the following year.

In 1855, Hussey's factory in Baltimore produced 521 reaping machines, its maximum annual output, up from 385 in 1854. In the following years, however, his output declined, with annual totals of 163, 95, 19, 10, and 24, respectively, for the years 1856 through 1860. Between 1848 and 1860, McCormick's company, the McCormick Harvesting Machine Company, manufactured more than ten times as many reaping machines as did Hussey's, and in the final years of the 1850s, Hussey had ceased to be a serious competitor in the harvest field. By 1868, demand for American harvesting equipment was enormous, both from within the country and beyond, and McCormick sold 8,000 reapers.

Most US iron smelting before 1850 took place near iron deposits in eastern Pennsylvania, New York, and northern New Jersey. Early American production of iron rails took place in the mid-1840s, in Danville, Pennsylvania and at the Mount Savage Iron Works at Mount Savage, Maryland; in the previous decade there were no factories in the nation capable of producing rails, and they were shipped by sea from Britain. Discovery of high-quality iron ores in the mid-19th century, particularly in the Iron Range, led to the fabrication of better-quality rails.

In the 1850s, the iron industries in Cleveland, Chicago, and Pittsburgh began to rapidly develop. The American Iron Company, later to be known as the Jones and Laughlin Steel Company, was founded in 1852 along the Monongahela River, just south of Pittsburgh. The first mill associated with what would become the Illinois Steel Company was the North Chicago Rolling Mill, founded in Chicago, Illinois by Eber Brock Ward in 1857 as a mill to reroll iron rails. In the same year, Chisholm, Jones & Company established a rolling mill to reroll worn rails, in an area that is now part of Cleveland, Ohio. The first blast furnace in Cleveland was built by the firm in 1861, which by then was known as the Stone, Chisholm & Jones Company.

==== Transportation ====
The Erie Canal was re-proposed in 1807 with a survey being funded in 1808. Construction began in 1817 and the original canal was about 363 miles with 34 numbered locks from Albany to Buffalo. Prior to the canal, bulk goods were limited to shipping by pack animal, there were no railways, and water became the most cost-effective way to ship bulk goods. Use of the canal was faster than using carts pulled by draft animals and cut transport costs by about 95%. The canal gave New York City's port an advantage over all other U.S. ports, and significantly contributed to its transformation into a major industrial and manufacturing center. It contributed to a growth in population in the State of New York as well as regions farther west. It inspired canals elsewhere, bringing a canal age.

The opening of the Lehigh Canal in 1829 accelerated the transformation of eastern Pennsylvania into a major center of the American Industrial Revolution. Its iron mining and anthracite coal mining industries, and its iron smelting and milling industries, experienced breakthroughs and by 1850 had emerged as national leaders.

In 1826, the State of New York authorized the construction of the Mohawk and Hudson Railroad, to carry freight and passengers around a bend in the Erie Canal.

In the same year, the Commonwealth of Pennsylvania inaugurated a transportation system known as the Main Line of Public Works, to allow for freight and passenger transportation between Philadelphia and Pittsburgh. Though there was not a single, unified rail line between the two cities until the 1850s, the Main Line system contributed to Pittsburgh's transformation into a major commercial and industrial gateway to the American West.

The rapidly growing port city of Baltimore, Maryland faced economic stagnation unless it opened a route to the Western states. On February 27, 1827, Maryland merchants and bankers discussed a means of restoring "that portion of the Western trade which has recently been diverted from it by the introduction of steam navigation". The following day, to link the Port of Baltimore to the Ohio River, the Baltimore and Ohio Railroad (B&O) was chartered. Its first section opened in 1830.

The railroad fed tens of millions of dollars of shipments to and from Baltimore and its growing hinterland to the west, thus making the city the commercial and financial capital of the region south of Philadelphia.

=== Legislation ===
In response to British aggression against the U.S., Congress passed the Embargo Act of 1807, which President Thomas Jefferson signed into law. The embargo was a cumulative addition to the Non-importation Act of 1806 (2 Stat. 379), which was a "Prohibition of the Importation of certain Goods and Merchandise from the Kingdom of Great Britain," the prohibited imported goods being defined where their chief value, which consists of leather, silk, hemp or flax, tin or brass, wool, glass, and paper goods, nails, hats, clothing, and beer.

The prohibition of imports under the Embargo Act resulted in the expansion of emerging U.S. domestic industries across the board, particularly the textile industry, and marked the beginning of the manufacturing system in the U.S., reducing dependence upon imported manufactured goods.

=== Tariffs ===
According to economic historian Douglas Irwin, a common myth about U.S. trade policy is that low tariffs harmed American manufacturers in the early 19th century and then that high tariffs made the United States into a great industrial power in the late 19th century. As its share of global manufacturing powered from 23% in 1870 to 36% in 1913, the high tariffs of the time came with a cost, estimated at around 0.5% of GDP in the mid-1870s. In some industries, they might have sped up development by a few years. However, U.S. economic growth during its protectionist era was driven more by its abundant resources and openness to people and ideas. A 2026 study by Iriwin found that trade wars and embargoes during the start of the 19th century did not accelerate US industrialization.

== Labor and finance ==
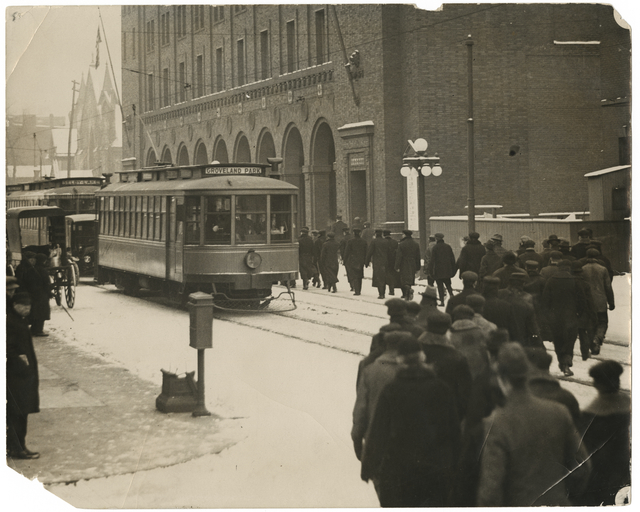
1917 Street Railway Company strike

The early Industrial Revolution, which lasted into the mid-19th century, was marked by shift in labor, from an outwork system of labor towards a factory system. Throughout this period, much of the U.S. population remained in small scale agriculture. Despite a small percentage of the population working in industry, the U.S. government took action to promote the expansion of U.S. industry. Alexander Hamilton backed ideas from the "American School" of economics that supported high tariffs to protect U.S. industry. This idea was embraced by the Whig Party in the early 19th century with their support for Henry Clay's American System. This plan, proposed shortly after the War of 1812, promoted protective tariffs and also called for construction of canals and roads to support the movement of manufactured goods around the country. As in Britain, the First Industrial Revolution revolved heavily around the textile industry. Early U.S. textile plants were located next to rivers and streams as they would use the running water to power the machinery in the plant. Thus, many of the factories of the First Industrial Revolution were in the northeastern U.S.

To aid the expansion of industry, Congress chartered the Bank of the United States in 1791, giving loans to help merchants and entrepreneurs secure needed capital. However, Jeffersonians saw this bank as an unconstitutional expansion of federal power, so when its charter expired in 1811, the Jeffersonian-dominated Congress did not renew it. State legislatures were persuaded to charter their own banks to continue helping merchants, artisans, and farmers who needed loans, and by 1816 there were 246 state-chartered banks. With these banks, states were able to support internal transportation improvements such as the Erie Canal, which stimulated economic development.

The First Industrial Revolution had a profound effect on labor in the U.S. Investors and companies from the era, such as the Boston Associates, would recruit thousands of New England farm girls to work in textile mills. These girls often received much lower wages than men, though the work and pay gave young women a sense of independence that they did not feel working on a farm. The First Industrial Revolution also marked the beginning of the rise of wage labor in the United States. As wage labor grew over the next century, it would go on to profoundly change American society.

== Impact ==
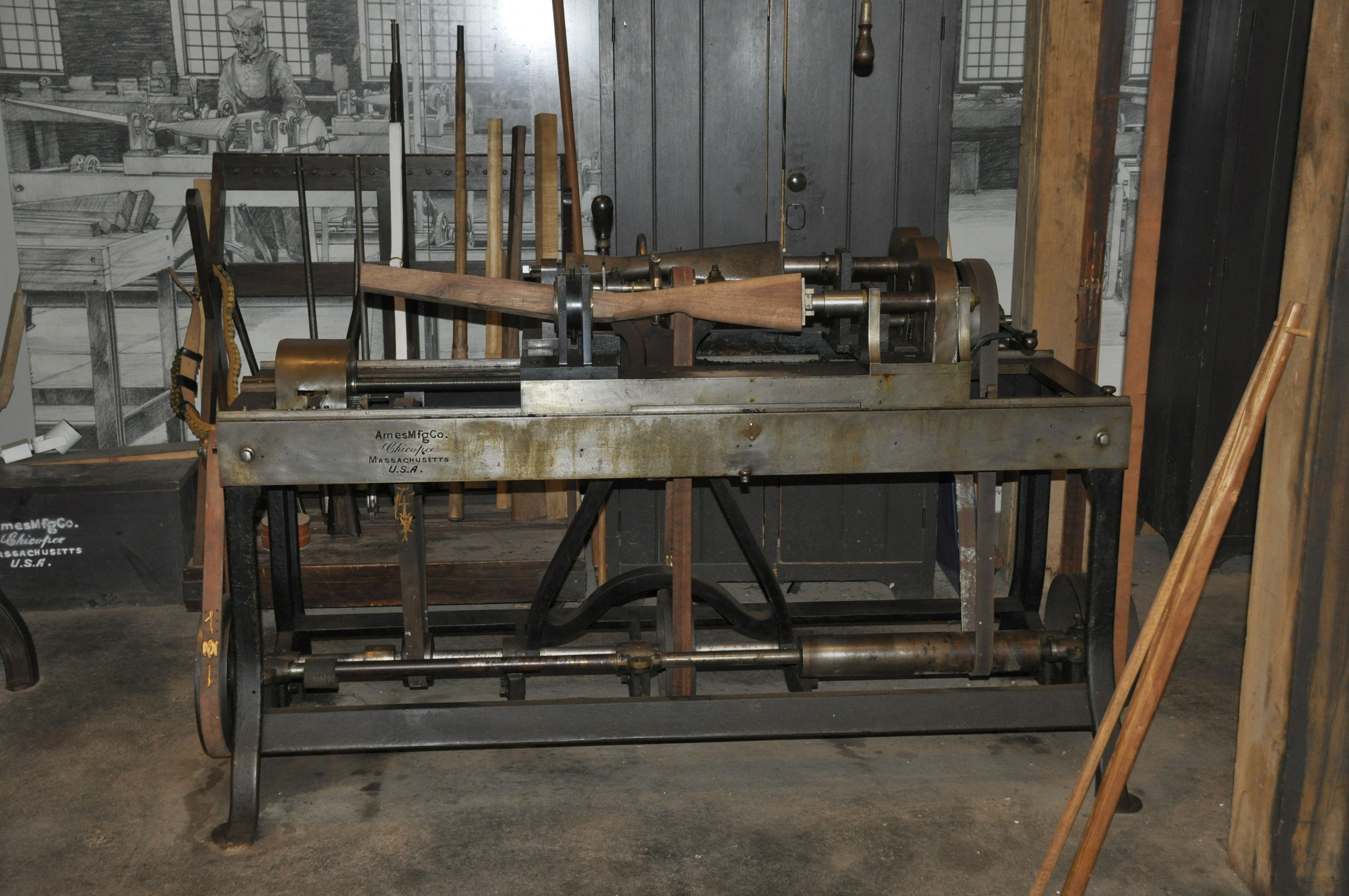
Blanchard lathe, powered by water, for creating stock identical to a pattern

The Industrial Revolution altered the U.S. economy and set the stage for the U.S. to dominate technological change and growth in the Second Industrial Revolution and the Gilded Age. These changes brought about a decrease in labor shortages which had characterized the economy through its early years. Several factors contributed to this decrease, including a transportation revolution in which low population density areas were better able to connect to the population centers through the Wilderness Road and the Erie Canal. Steamboats and rail transport led to urbanization and an increased labor force available around larger cities, including Chicago, Philadelphia, and New York City. Quicker movement of resources and goods around the country drastically increased trade efficiency and output while allowing for an extensive transport base for the U.S. to grow.

Techniques to make interchangeable parts allowed easy assembly and repair of firearms or other devices, minimizing the time and skill needed to repair or assemble devices. By the beginning of the Civil War, rifles with interchangeable parts had been developed, and after the war, more complex devices such as sewing machines and typewriters were made with interchangeable parts. Interchangeable parts made the development of the assembly line possible. In addition to making production faster, the assembly line eliminated the need for skilled craftsmen because each worker would only do one repetitive step instead of the entire process.

== See also ==
- Industrial Revolution
- Second Industrial Revolution
