= Joshua Fisher =

Joshua Fisher may refer to:

- Joshua Fisher (born 1675) (1675–1730), colonial Massachusetts politician
- Joshua Fisher (merchant) (1707–1783), Philadelphia merchant
- Joshua Fisher (Massachusetts politician) (died 1672), colonial Massachusetts politician
- Joshua Fisher (physician) (1749–1836), president of the Massachusetts Medical Society and owner of the Beverly Cotton Manufactory
- Joshua Francis Fisher (107-1873), American author and philanthropist
