= Tristram Dalton =

American politician (1738–1817)

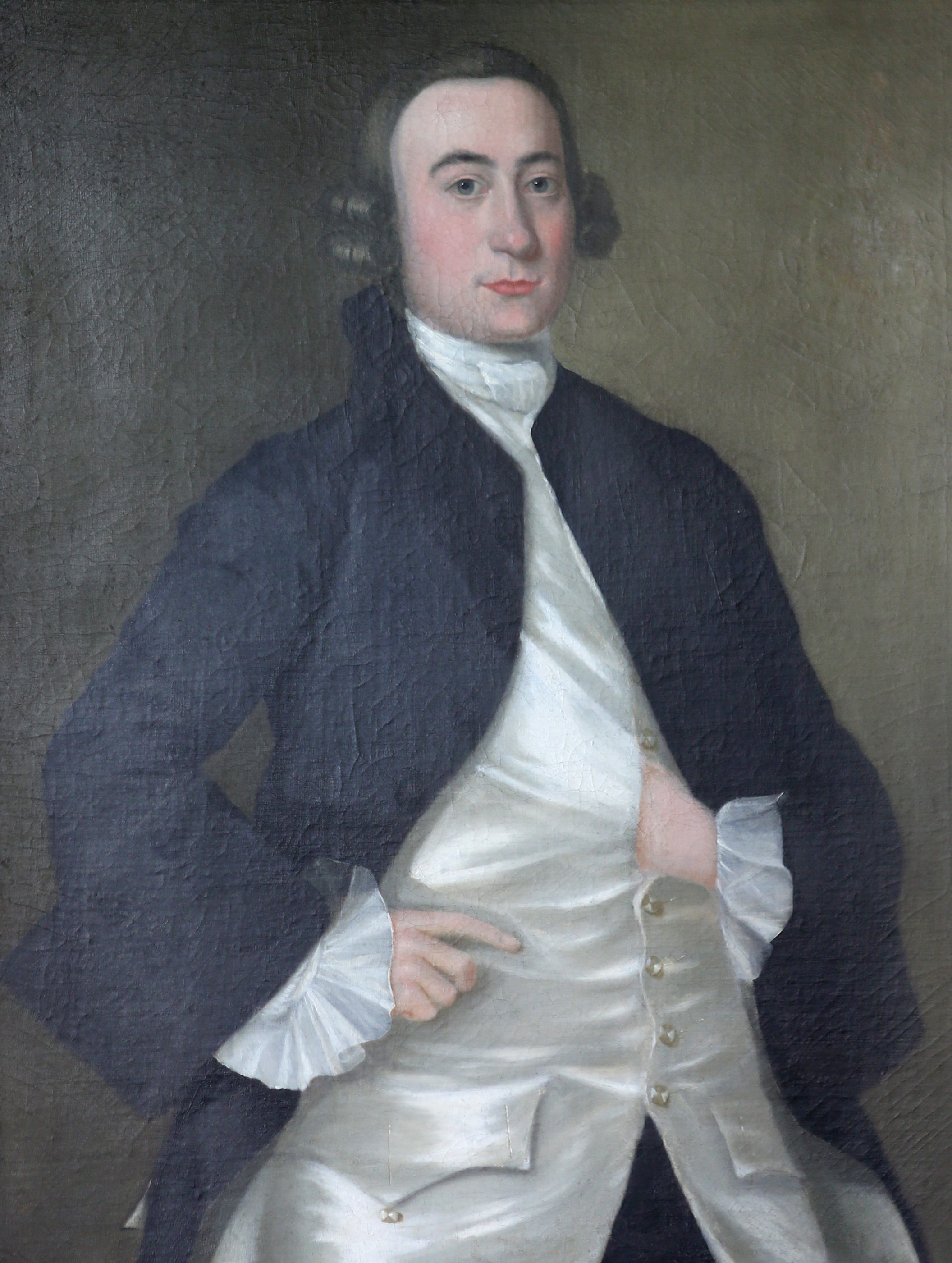
- Portrait by Joseph Blackburn, 1750–1758

United States Senator from Massachusetts
- In office March 4, 1789 – March 3, 1791
- Preceded by: Office Established
- Succeeded by: George Cabot

8th Commissioner of the Federal City
- In office March 10, 1801 – July 1, 1802
- Preceded by: William Cranch
- Succeeded by: Office abolished

Personal details
- Born: May 28, 1738 Newburyport, Massachusetts
- Died: May 30, 1817 (aged 79) Boston, Massachusetts
- Party: Pro-Administration
- Education: Harvard College
- Profession: Merchant

Tristram Dalton (May 28, 1738 – May 30, 1817) was an American politician and merchant from Massachusetts. He served a single term as one of the first United States senators, from 1789 to 1791. He was for many years one of the leading citizens of Newburyport, Massachusetts, but lost most of his fortune due to ill-timed and mismanaged investments in the real estate of Washington, D.C.

== Early life ==
Tristram Dalton was born in a part of Newbury, Massachusetts, that is now Newburyport, the only child of Michael and Mary (Little) Dalton. He graduated from Harvard College in 1755, in a class that also included John Adams. Afterwards, he studied law and was admitted to the bar, but did not practice, instead pursuing a career as a merchant. Dalton's father was a ship's captain turned merchant, involved in trade with Europe and the West Indies, and was instrumental in securing the separation of Newburyport from Newbury. Upon his father's death in 1770, Tristram inherited an estate and local businesses that made him Newburyport's wealthiest citizen.

== Political career ==
Dalton was not significantly involved in politics until 1774, when the tensions of the American Revolution were rising but the American Revolutionary War had not yet started. He was elected to the Massachusetts Provincial Congress and the Newburyport board of selectmen in 1774, and was an active proponent of independence after the war broke out. His contributions included provisioning of ships from his merchant fleet to the Penobscot Expedition of 1780. Dalton served as a member of the Massachusetts House of Representatives from 1782 to 1785, and served as its speaker in 1784. He served as a Massachusetts state senator from 1786 to 1788.

Dalton was elected to the Continental Congress in 1783 and 1784, but did not attend. He was elected as a delegate to the state convention on the adoption of the United States Constitution, in which he advocated for its adoption. In 1788 he was elected as one of the state's first United States Senators, along with Caleb Strong. Strong won the draw for the longer of the two terms, leaving Dalton with a short two-year term. He served from March 4, 1789, to March 3, 1791. In the 1791 election (US Senators were then chosen by vote of the state legislature), Dalton ran a distant fourth against George Cabot, the eventual victor, and others.

In 1801 he was appointed by President Thomas Jefferson as the last commissioner of the Federal City, which by then had been named Washington in the District of Columbia. He filled the seat vacated by William Cranch who was appointed to the bench in the new capitol and served for a little over a year until the Board of Commissioners of the Federal City was disbanded in 1802.

== Later life ==
Dalton had married Ruth Hooper, the daughter of a wealthy Marblehead merchant, in 1761. They had grown fond of the city life in New York City (then the seat of the federal government), and moved there, and then Philadelphia. When the site of the nation's capital was selected, Dalton sold off most of his property in Massachusetts, and speculatively purchased land in Washington, D.C. Many of the family's personal items were lost when the ship carrying them to Washington foundered. Dalton's investment was also a failure, as Washington real estate did not appreciate, and he had invested through an unscrupulous agent, wiping out most of his fortune.

In order to make ends meet, Dalton was given a patronage appointment as surveyor of the port of Boston, serving from November 1814 until his death on May 30, 1817. He is interred in the churchyard of St. Paul's Episcopal Church in Newburyport. His wife died in 1826. Of their ten children, only three girls survived to adulthood.

== Slave ownership ==
According to research conducted by The Washington Post, Dalton was one of only two members of Congress from Massachusetts who owned slaves. In 1804, Dalton buried his slave, named Fortune, in the all white consecrated Old Burying Hill Cemetery by the Bartlet Mall in Newburport.

== Honors and legacy ==
Dalton was a charter member of the American Academy of Arts and Sciences, founded in 1780.

Tristram Dalton is the namesake of Dalton, Massachusetts, Dalton, New Hampshire and Dalton, Georgia.

== Notes ==
U.S. Senate
Preceded by Office Created	U.S. senator (Class 1) from Massachusetts; March 4, 1789 – March 3, 1791; Served alongside: Caleb Strong	Succeeded by George Cabot
