= Joshua Fisher (physician) =

American physician (1748–1833)

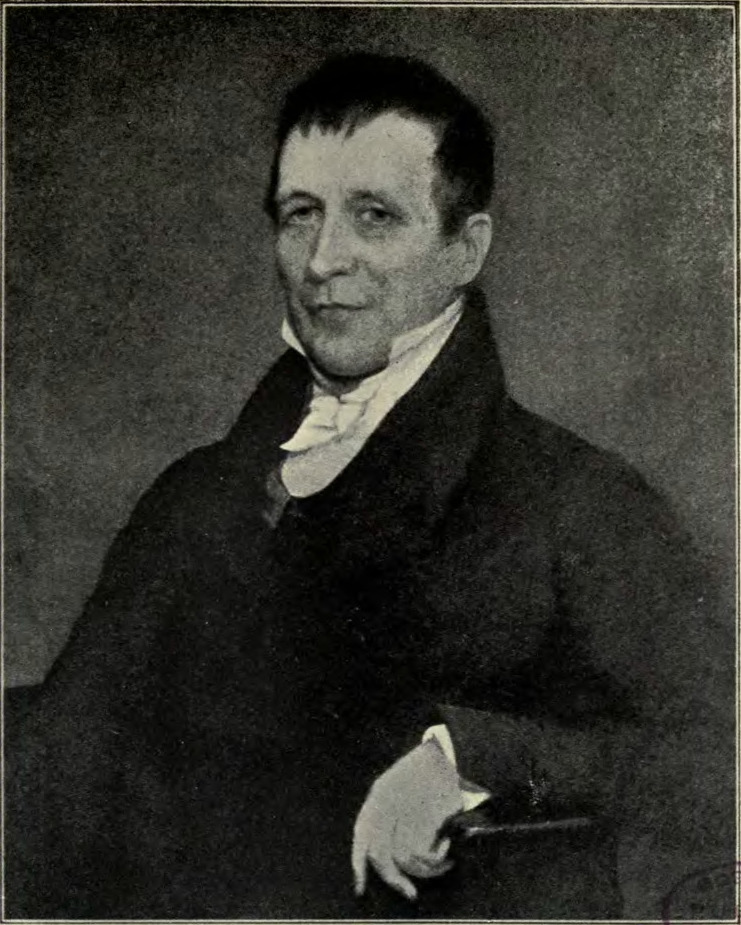
- Born: Joshua Fisher; May 17, 1748; Dedham, Massachusetts, U.S.
- Died: March 26, 1833 (aged 84); Beverly, Massachusetts, U.S.
- Education: Harvard College
- Occupation: President of the Massachusetts Medical Society Founder of Beverly Cotton Manufactory

Joshua Fisher (May 17, 1748 – March 26, 1833) was an American medical doctor who was president of the Massachusetts Medical Society and a co–owner and manager of the Beverly Cotton Manufactory, the first cotton mill built in America.

== Early life ==
Fisher was born on May 17, 1748 in Dedham, Massachusetts to Nathaniel and Elizabeth (Clapp) Fisher. He had a speech impediment due to a birth defect in the palate. As corrective surgery was not yet available, he was forced to keep a silver plate in his mouth while talking. He began attending school at the age of six and graduated from Harvard College in 1766. He taught school for two years, but a respiratory illness left him disabled for a time and forced him to abandon this profession.

== Medicine ==
In 1770, Fisher began studying medicine with Dr. Bela Lincoln, a physician from Hingham, Massachusetts and the brother of General Benjamin Lincoln. He first practiced medicine in Ipswich, Massachusetts before moving to Salem, Massachusetts. In 1776, he moved to Beverly, Massachusetts, where he remained for the rest of his life. During the American Revolutionary War, he was a naval surgeon on a privateer. The ship was run ashore in the English Channel and Fisher was able to escape to France, where he boarded another privateer. He then returned to Boston aboard a letter of marque.

From 1804 to 1815, he was vice president of the Massachusetts Medical Society. He succeeded John Warren as president in 1815 and held that office until his resignation in 1823.

According to Andrew Preston Peabody, Fisher opposed bloodletting and instead "placed great reliance on narcotics in all inflammatory diseases", which included giving patients "unlimited quantities of opium." Peabody also wrote that Fisher did not like to perform surgery and "shrank from the sight of blood". In an 1806 address before the Massachusetts Medical Society, Fisher spoke about using hemlock to treat President of Harvard University Joseph Willard for jaundice.

== Beverly Cotton Manufactory ==
In 1787, Fisher was a co-founder of the Beverly Cotton Manufactory, the first cotton mill built in America. He owned 22.5% of the company, which made him one of its largest individual shareholders. He and Capt. John Cabot were the managers of the factory. The venture was not a financial success and on January 11, 1798, Cabot and Fisher, having bought all shares of the company, sold the property to Samuel Blanchard for $2,630.29. The factory closed by 1813 and burned on October 13, 1828.

== Personal life ==
Fisher was married twice. His first wife, Abigail Staniford, died childless. On November 11, 1807, he married Anna Bridge, widow of Dr. Richard Perkins Bridge of Framingham, Massachusetts. He had three stepchildren from this marriage. Anna Fisher died on January 12, 1829.

== Politics and philanthropy ==
Fisher was a member of the Federalist Party and a political associate of George Cabot and Fisher Ames, the latter of whom was also his second cousin. He served for a time in the Massachusetts Senate. He was also president of the Beverly Bank for several years. In 1807, he was the founding president of the Beverly Charitable Society, which was renamed the Fisher Charitable Society after his death.

Fisher died on March 26, 1833. In his will, he left $20,000 to Harvard University to create the Fisher Professorship of Natural History, $3,000 to the First Church and Parish in Dedham, $1,000 to the Beverly Charitable Society, and about $7,000 in reversionary property to the First Congregational Society in Beverly.
