= Samuel Slater =

English-American industrialist (1768–1835)

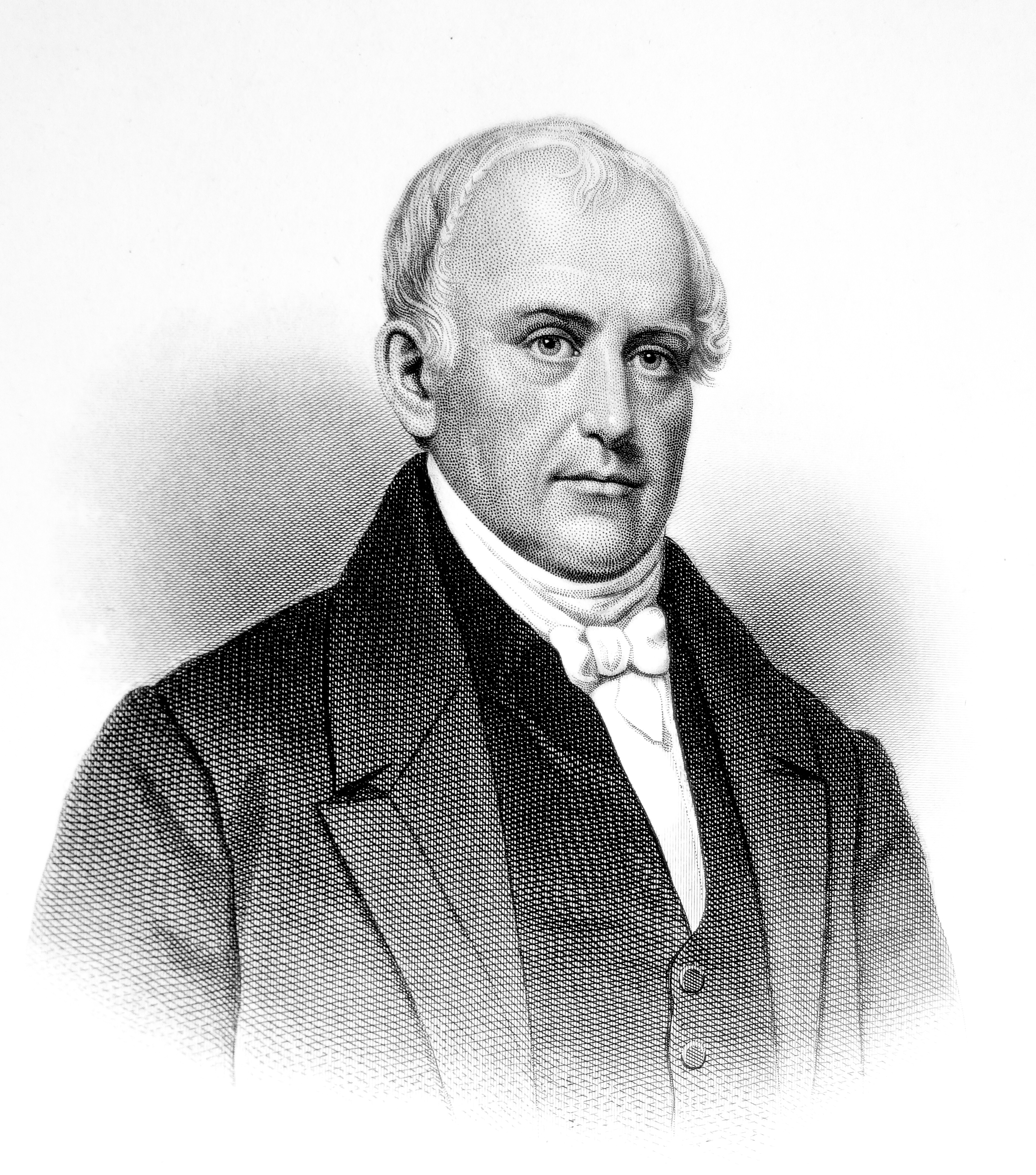
- Samuel Slater
- Born: June 9, 1768; Belper, Derbyshire, England
- Died: April 21, 1835 (aged 66); Webster, Massachusetts, U.S.
- Occupations: Industrialist, Author
- Known for: Bringing the Industrial Revolution to the U.S. from Great Britain
- Spouses: Hannah Wilkinson Slater (m. 1791; died 1812) Esther Parkinson (m. 1817)

Samuel Slater (June 9, 1768 – April 21, 1835) was an early English-American industrialist known as the "Father of the American Industrial Revolution", a phrase coined by Andrew Jackson, and the "Father of the American Factory System". In the United Kingdom, he was called "Slater the Traitor" and "Sam the Slate" because he brought British textile technology to the United States, modifying it for American use. He memorized the textile factory machinery designs as an apprentice to a pioneer in the British industry before migrating to the U.S. at the age of 21.

Slater designed the first textile mill in the U.S. He later went into business for himself, developing a family business with his sons. He eventually owned 13 spinning mills and developed tenant farms and company towns around them. One of these towns was Slatersville, Rhode Island.

== Early life and education ==
Slater was born to William and Elizabeth Slater on June 9, 1768, in Belper, Derbyshire, England. He was the fifth son in a farming family of eight children. He received a basic education, perhaps at a school run by Thomas Jackson. At age ten, he began work at the cotton mill opened that year by Jedediah Strutt using the water frame pioneered by Richard Arkwright at nearby Cromford Mill. In 1782, his father died, and his family indentured Samuel as an apprentice to Strutt. Slater was well trained by Strutt and, by age 21, he had gained a thorough knowledge of the organization and practice of cotton spinning.

He learned of the American interest in developing similar machines, and he was also aware of British law against exporting the designs. He memorized as much as he could, and departed for New York City in 1789. Some people of Belper called him "Slater the Traitor", as they considered his move a betrayal of the town where many earned their living at Strutt's mills.

== Career ==
=== Mill development ===
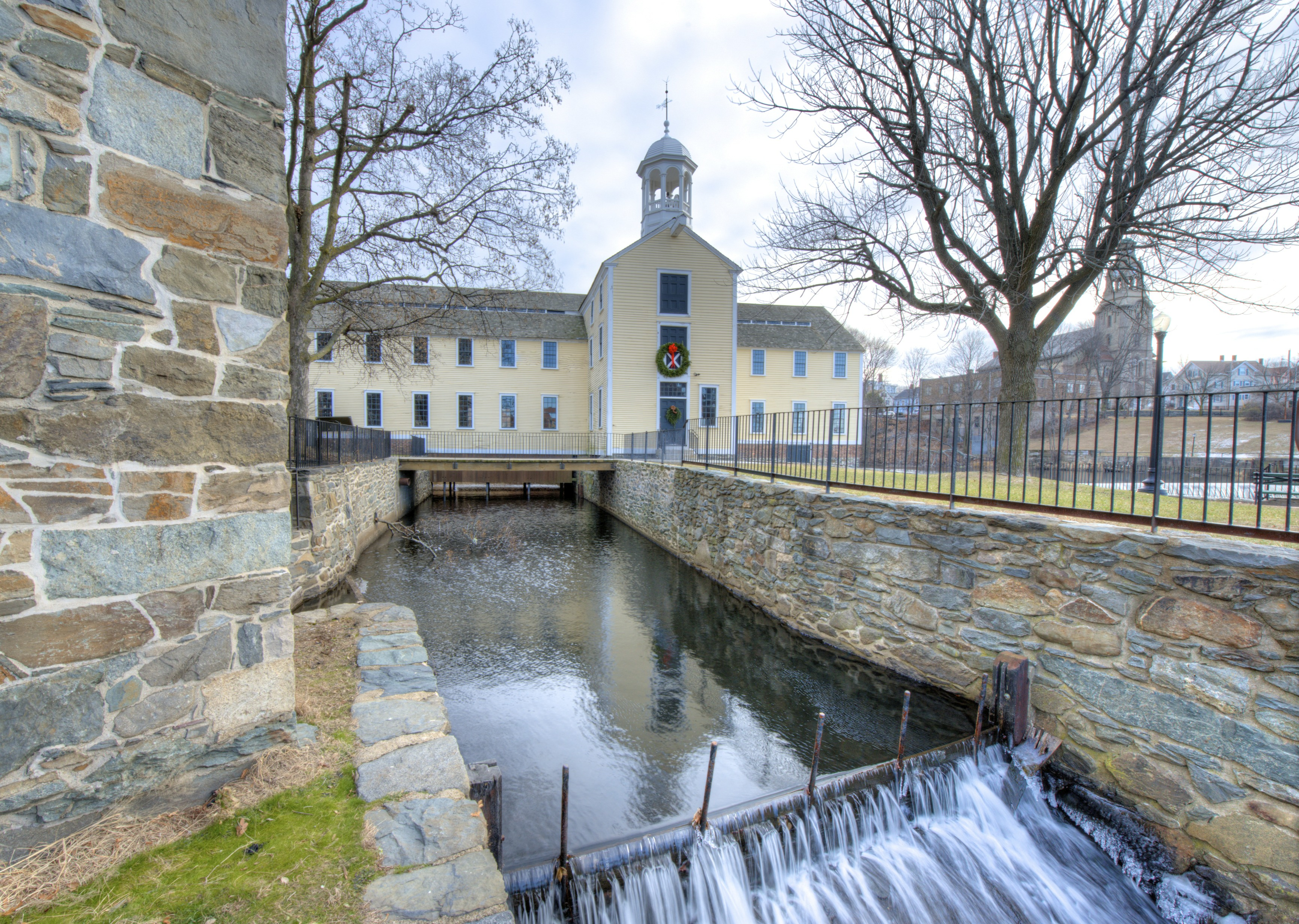
Slater Mill in Pawtucket, Rhode Island, a designated U.S. National Historic Landmark

In 1789, Rhode Island–based industrialist Moses Brown moved to Pawtucket, Rhode Island, to operate a mill in partnership with his son-in-law William Almy and cousin Smith-Brown. Almy & Brown, as the company was to be called, was housed in a former fulling mill near the Pawtucket Falls of the Blackstone River. They planned to manufacture cloth for sale, with yarn to be spun on spinning wheels, jennies, and frames, using water power.

In August 1789, they acquired a 32-spindle frame "after the Arkwright pattern" but could not operate it. At this point, Slater wrote to them, offering his services. Slater realized that nothing could be done with the machinery as it stood and convinced Brown of his knowledge. He promised: "If I do not make as good yarn, as they do in England, I will have nothing for my services but will throw the whole of what I have attempted over the bridge."

In 1790, he signed a contract with Brown to replicate the British designs. Their deal provided Slater with the funds to build the water frames and associated machinery, with a half share in their capital value and the profits derived from them. Slater found no mechanics in the U.S. when he arrived and had great difficulty finding someone to build the machinery. Eventually, he located Oziel Wilkinson and his son, David, to produce iron castings and forgings for the machinery. According to David Wilkinson: "all the turning of the iron for the cotton machinery built by Mr. Slater was done with hand chisels or tools in lathes turned by cranks with hand power".

By 1791, Slater had some of the equipment operating, despite shortages of tools and skilled mechanics. He was able to single-handedly construct from memory the water-powered spinning machinery. By December, the shop was operational with ten to twelve workers. In 1793, Slater and Brown opened their first factory in Pawtucket.

Slater knew the secret of Arkwright's success, including varying fiber lengths and Arkwright's carding, drawing, and roving machines. He also had the experience of working with all the elements as a continuous production system. During construction, Slater made some adjustments to the designs to fit local needs. The result was the first successful water-powered roller spinning textile mill in the U.S.

After developing this mill, Slater instituted management principles that he had learned from Strutt and Arkwright to teach workers to be skilled mechanics. This included child labor similar to what existed in England.

In 1812, Slater built the Old Green Mill, later known as Cranston Print Works, in East Village in Webster, Massachusetts. He moved to Webster due in part to an available workforce, but also due to abundant water power from Webster Lake.

=== Rhode Island System ===
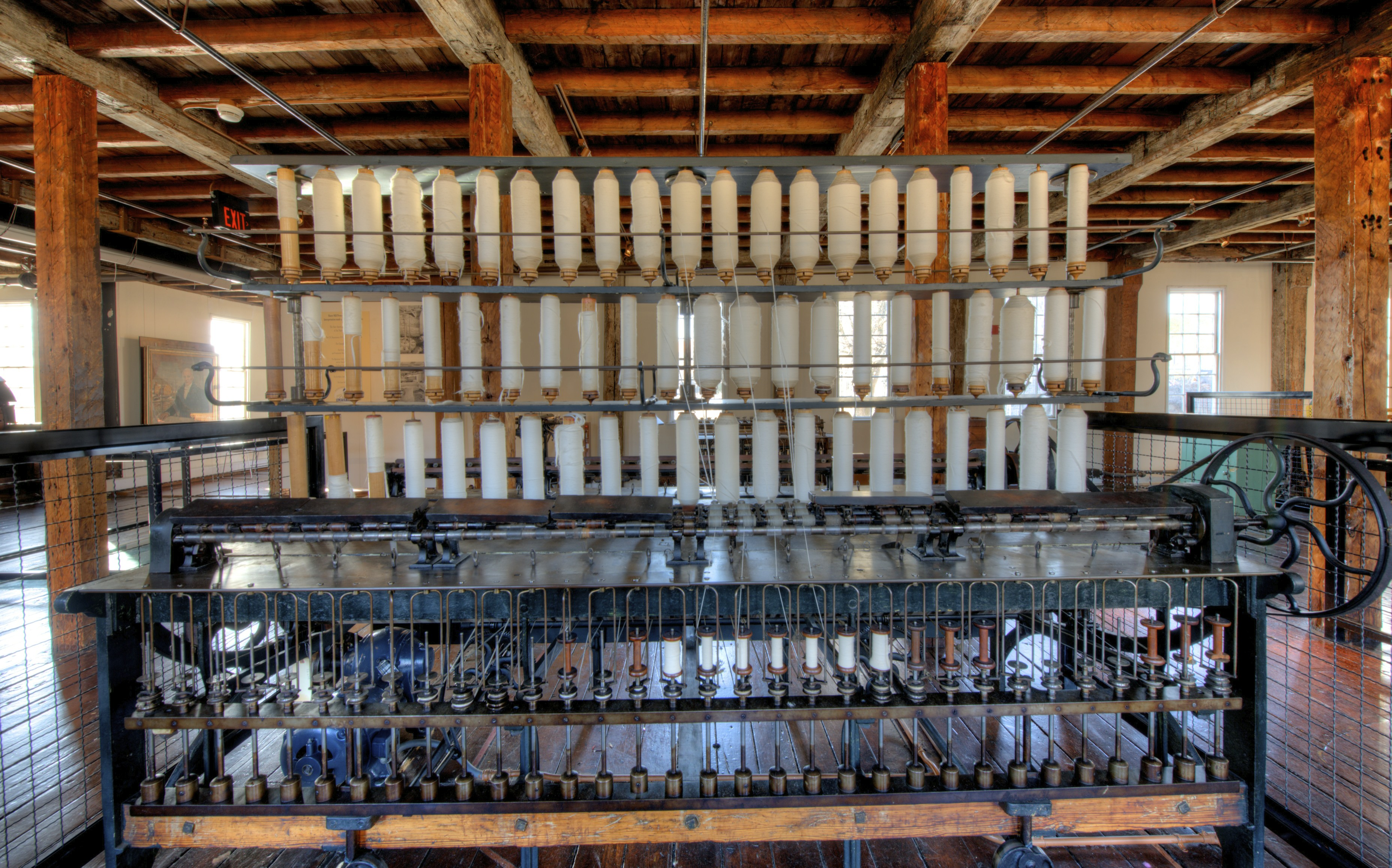
A spinning frame at Slater Mill, developed c. 1835

Slater created the Rhode Island System, which was a system of factory practices based upon the close-knit family life patterns in New England villages.

In contrast to England, where he had hired women and children, Slater recruited whole families, developing entire tenant farms and villages. He provided company-owned housing nearby, along with company stores; he sponsored a Sunday School where college students taught the children reading and writing.

Children aged seven to 12 were the first employees of the mill; Slater personally supervised them. The first child workers were hired in 1790. Slater also brought a Sunday school system from his native England to his textile factory at Pawtucket.

Slater constructed a new mill in 1793 for the sole purpose of textile manufacture under Almy, Brown & Slater, as he was now partners with Almy and Brown. It was a 72-spindle mill; the patenting of Eli Whitney's cotton gin in 1794 reduced the labor in processing short-staple cotton. It enabled profitable cultivation of this cotton variety, which could be grown in the interior uplands, unlike the long-staple variety of the Sea Islands and lowlands. There was a dramatic expansion of cotton cultivation throughout the Deep South in the antebellum years, especially after the 1830s Indian Removal that forced most of the Five Civilized Tribes to resettle west of the Mississippi River. The New England mills and their labor force of free men depended on southern cotton, which was based on enslaved labor by African Americans.

In 1798, Samuel Slater split from Almy and Brown, forming Samuel Slater & Company in partnership with his father-in-law, Oziel Wilkinson. They developed other mills in Connecticut, Massachusetts, New Hampshire, and Rhode Island.

In 1799, he was joined by his brother John Slater from England. John was a wheelwright who had spent time studying the latest English developments and might well have gained experience of the spinning mule. Samuel put John Slater in charge of a large mill called the White Mill.

By 1810, Slater held part ownership in three factories in Massachusetts and Rhode Island. In 1823, he bought a mill in Connecticut. He also built factories to make the textile manufacturing machinery used by many of the region's mills and formed a partnership with his brother-in-law to produce iron for use in machinery construction.

Slater soon found himself spread too thin and was unable to coordinate or integrate his many different business interests. He refused to go outside his family to hire managers, and, after 1829, he made his sons partners in the new umbrella firm of Samuel Slater and Sons. His son Horatio Nelson Slater completely reorganized the family business, introduced cost-cutting measures, and gave up old-fashioned procedures.

Slater hired recruiters to search for families willing to work at the mill. He advertised to attract more families to the mills.

By 1800, the Slater mill's success had been duplicated by other entrepreneurs. By 1810, U.S. Secretary of the Treasury Albert Gallatin reported that the U.S. had some 50 cotton-yarn mills, many of them started in response to the Embargo of 1807, which cut off imports and trade with Britain before the War of 1812. That war resulted in speeding up the process of industrialization in New England. By war's end in 1815, there were 140 cotton manufacturers within 30 miles of Providence, employing 26,000 hands and operating 130,000 spindles. The American textile industry was launched.

Slater & Company became one of the leading manufacturing companies in the United States. Due to the oppressive rules and working conditions and a proposed cut of 25% in the wages of women workers in 1824 by Slater and the other Mill Owners near Pawtucket, the women resisted and conducted the first factory strike in US history. This began the long struggle for human rights between factory workers and owners, which is ongoing.

Slater resisted unionization. In response to rapidly changing textile technology, he modernized his factories and later shifted operations to the South.

== Personal life ==
In 1791, Slater married Hannah Wilkinson. She invented two-ply thread in 1793 and became the first American woman to be granted a patent. Samuel and Hannah had ten children together; four died during infancy. Hannah died in 1812 from complications of childbirth, leaving Samuel with six young children to raise.

Slater married for a second time in 1817 to a widow, Esther Parkinson. As his business was extremely successful by this time, and as Parkinson also owned the property before their marriage, the couple arranged for a pre-nuptial agreement. Along with his brother, Samuel started the Slater family in America.

== Death ==
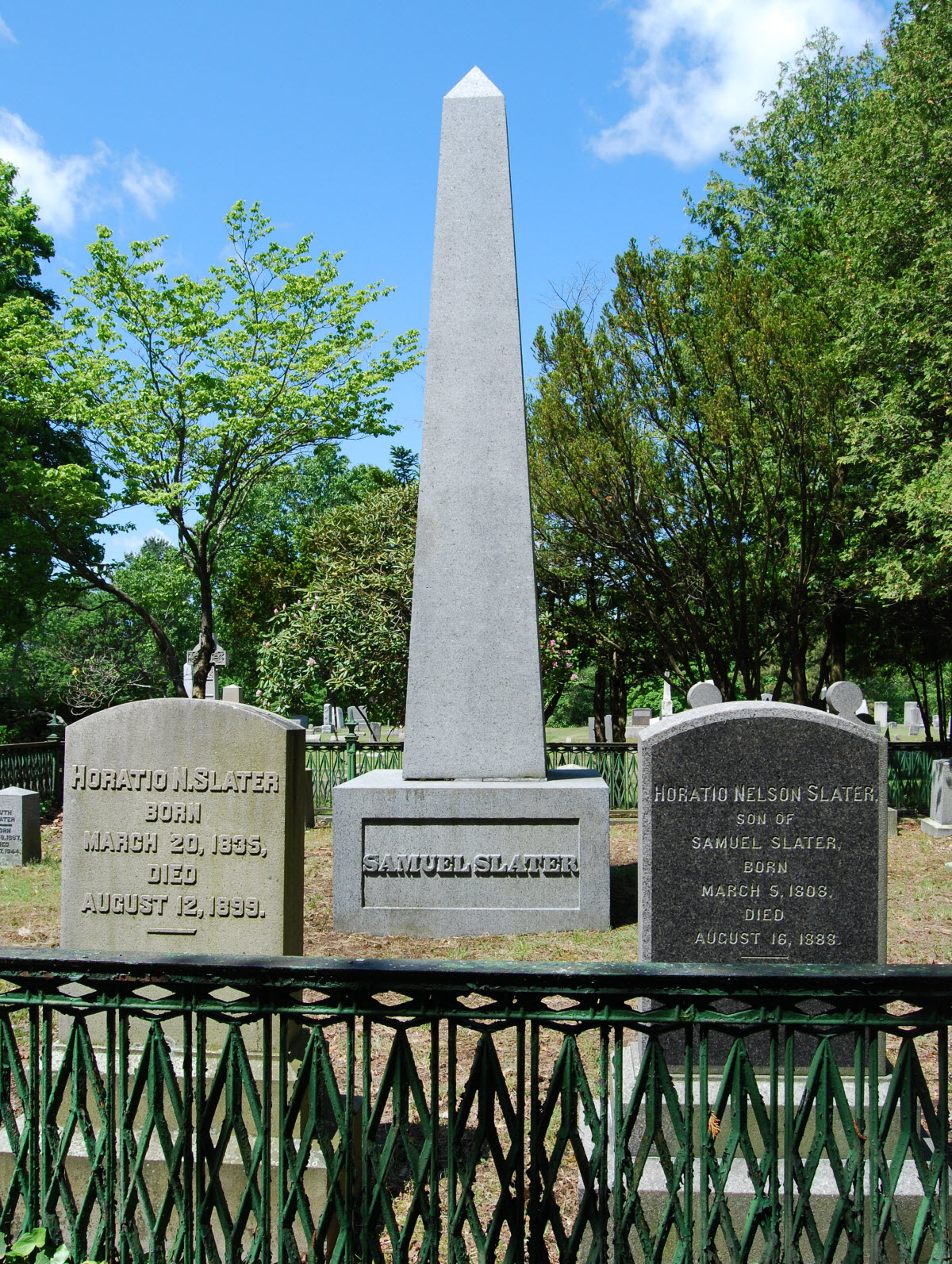
Slater's grave site at Mt. Zion Cemetery in Webster, Massachusetts

Slater died on April 21, 1835, in Webster, Massachusetts, a town which he had founded in 1832 and named for his friend Senator Daniel Webster. He is buried in Mount Zion Cemetery. At the time of his death, he owned 13 mills and was worth US$1.3 million, the income value in 2022 of US$1.12 billion.

== Legacy and honors ==
Slater's original mill still stands, known today as Slater Mill and listed on the National Register of Historic Places. It is operated as a museum dedicated to preserving Samuel Slater's history and his contribution to American industry. Slater's original mill in Pawtucket and the town of Slatersville are both parts of the Blackstone River Valley National Historical Park, which was created to preserve and interpret the history of the industrial development of the region.

His papers are held at the Harvard Business School's Baker Library in Boston.

Samuel Slater Experience, a history museum dedicated to his life and legacy, located in Webster, Massachusetts, opened in March 2022.
