= Beverly Cotton Manufactory =

Historic cotton mill in Beverly, Massachusetts, US

- Illustration of Beverly Cotton Manufactory

Brick
- Location: Beverly, Massachusetts, U.S.
- Owner: The Proprietors of the Beverly Cotton Manufactory
- Coordinates: 42°34′22″N 70°53′34″W

Construction
- Built: 1785 (started)
- Completed: November 1, 1787
- Destroyed: October 13, 1828

Beverly Cotton Manufactory was the first cotton mill built in America, and the largest cotton mill to be built during its era. It was built hoping for economic success, but reached a downturn due to technical limitations of the then early production process and limitations of the machines being used. Being the birthplace and testing grounds of the cotton milling industry at the time, it has been called the birthplace of the American Industrial Revolution.

== History ==
The founders of the original mill business concept were Thomas Somers and James Leonard, who had recruited others to build and create the mill and machines. In 1787, Beverly Cotton Manufactory was established by The Proprietors of the Beverly Cotton Manufactory, a Massachusetts company that consisted of Capt. John Cabot, George Cabot, Andrew Cabot, Deborah Higginson Cabot, Henry Higginson, Dr. Joshua Fisher, Moses Brown, Israel Thorndike, and Isaac Chapman. In 1789, legislation had shown that 22/40 of company ownership was shared by Cabot and Higginson incorporators, with 9/40 being owned by Fisher, 4/40 by Brown, 4/40 by Thorndike, and 1/40 belonging to Chapman. Capt. Cabot and Fisher were the largest shareholders individually, 19/40 together, and were the managers of the manufactory. Massachusetts legislature formed a decision on lending for the mill to be built. As a group, the proprietors were the inventors of the first methods in America of spinning cotton commercially. On February 17, 1789, the Massachusetts legislature decided to repay The Proprietors of the Beverly Cotton Manufactory for £500 of their losses and efforts in starting the mill, as a valuable resource for the community.

=== Early stages ===
View of Baker's corner from 589 Cabot St, modern-day Henry's Grocery.

Although the plant was not erected until the summer of 1787, there are port records indicating shipments of cotton being imported as early as March 1785. The business officially opened for the plant on November 1, 1787. On November 23, 1787, 1 box of "coarse woolen and linen cloth here manufactured" was shipped to Maryland, and on December 11, 1787, "1 piece coarse check'd cloath here made" was shipped to the Cape de Verde Islands. Records suggest the Manufactory machines may have been in use before the actual building for the Manufactory was conceived, most likely for testing purposes regarding the new invention.

George Cabot persuaded Thomas Somers and James Leonard, investors from England, to come to Beverly in the fall of 1787. On April 22, 1788 it was reported by the Salem Mercury newspaper that the mill's hardware had been completed, including a spinning jenny, carding machine, warping machine, and other tools. "A building of brick was erected in the second parish, near 'Bakers Corner,' at the junction of Birch Plain and Ipswich Roads."

Beverly received a visit from George Washington in the fall of 1789 during his New England tour. He made notes in his diary that "In short, the whole seemed perfect, and the cotton stuffs which they turn out, excellent of their kind."

=== Financial issues ===
Beverly mill suffered from economic problems, specifically with the costs associated with building such a mill. There were no government subsidies available to offset the costs, with most of the burden lying on the Cabot Family investors. Legislation was passed to protect the mill and the people, including legislation not to raise taxes to offset the costs of the mill, and prevent local competition from forming out of the economic weakness that the mill created.

Much of the funding that kept the mill alive in the beginning years came from the Public Treasury of Massachusetts in the form of a bailout. On January 15, 1789, John Cabot, George Cabot, Deborah Cabot, Andrew Cabot, Moses Brown, Nathan Dane, Joshua Fisher, Thomas Somers, Israel Thorndike, James Leonard, Henry Higginson, and Isaac Chapman petitioned to the Legislature that the creation of the mill was a major financial burden for everyone involved. Being a major asset to the region, they noted the following: the employment of otherwise unlabored women and children, the ability to fabricate almost any type of cotton or linen at the time, the low costs of cotton locally in the region (50% lower than imported goods.) The total loss to the proprietors of the Manufactory totaled £687 12s. 2d., a value of approximately $2,500. It was estimated that the entire company was worth £90,000, or $300,000.

On February 3, 1789, the proprietors formed a corporation named "The Proprietors of the Beverly Cotton Manufactory." Several proprietors and contributors did not join the ownership, including Nathan Dane, Thomas Somers, and James Leonard.

On February 17, 1789, The Legislature decided to repay "The Proprietors of the Beverly Cotton Manufactory" for £500 of their losses and efforts in starting a valuable resource for the community. This bailout had a cost, however. Beverly Cotton Manufactory would be required to create a quantity of 50,000 yards of cotton, aggregately, and keep a record of all kinds, quantities, and values of the cotton produced. The record would be verified by the testimony of at least two of the proprietors on oath. A copy of the document would be kept in the Commonwealth Secretary's office. The Manufactory would also be required to pay £500 back to the Commonwealth within eight years.

=== Mill secrecy ===
Due to the nature of the new business, relying on proprietary machinery and methods, the workers and owners of the Beverly mill did not show its wares to anyone who would potentially steal their ideas to run a rival mill. Moses Brown from Providence had contacted the Beverly mill in a request for information but was denied the information he was looking for. In a statement from Brown, he writes:

"As to cutting knives, which is found very difficult to temper, and is considered by the Beverly Workmen as a great Secret, having accidentally fallen in with the maker of theirs should you stand in need I will inform you where you may have them made by their Workmen. They refused to let me see their Knives or the operation of cutting tho' simple as it is."

The competition between the Beverly Mill and the Slater Mill, after its foundation, caused Beverly mill to lose workers as people moved to the other factory. Several workers had been hired at Slater Mill, to which Beverly responded that they would not rehire those workers if they came back. Since the Beverly mill was based on horsepower, the mill was not competitive against soon to be developed future innovations, including water-driven mills. However, the Beverly mill laid the cornerstone for mill technologies in the future.

Modern-day questions about the commercial viability of Beverly mill were called into question as Slater Mill was founded. Moses Brown of Providence had stated in a letter to the Beverly mill that Beverly's manufactory process is the "first and largest" (1791). In addition, Robert Lovett, a business historian, wrote that "Beverly . . . was the earliest to manufacture cloth, at private expense, by means of power-driven machines."

=== Shutdown ===
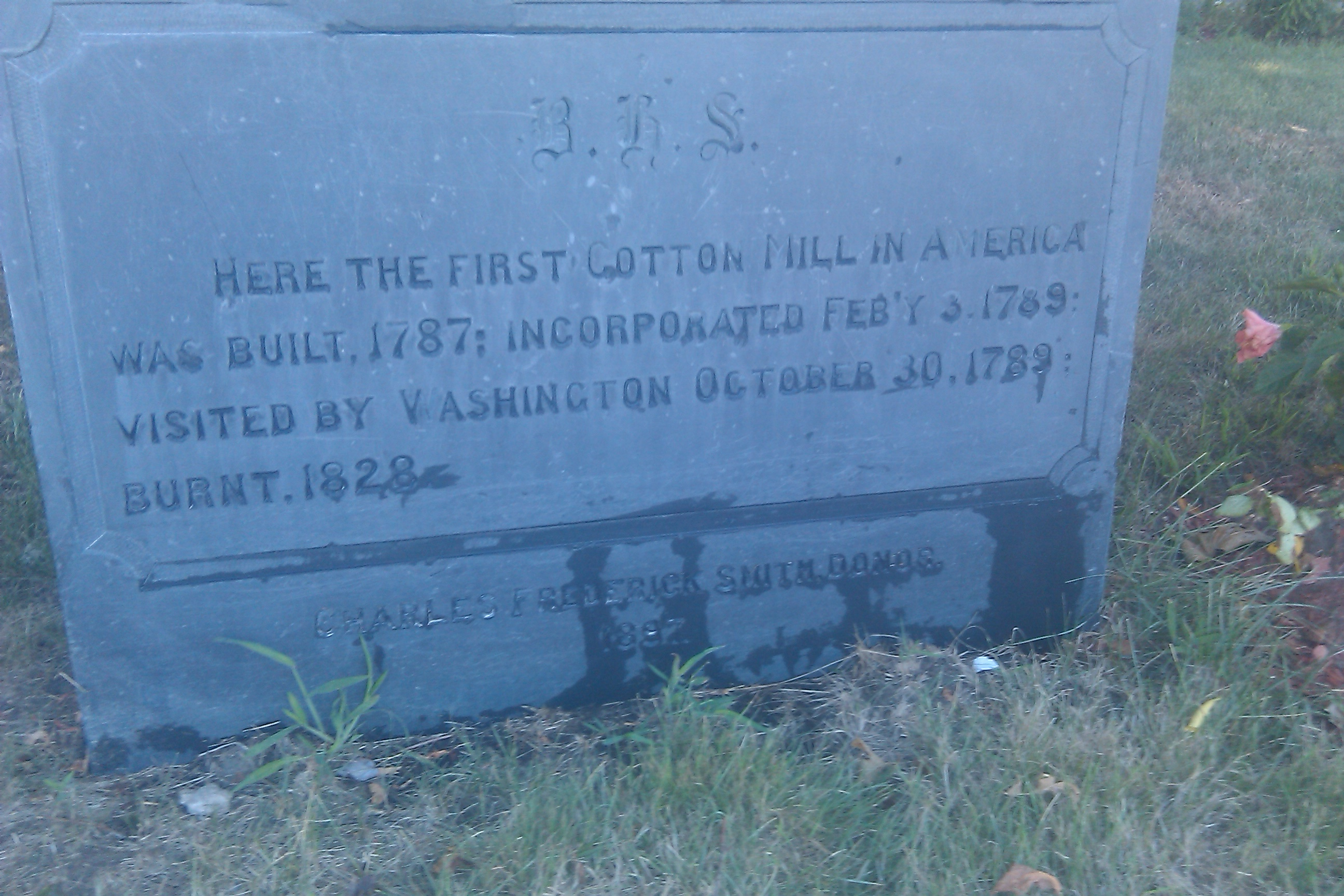
Beverly Historical Society; Here the first cotton mill in America was built, 1787; incorporated February 3, 1789; visited by Washington October 30, 1789; burnt 1828; Charles Frederick Smith, Donor; 1897.

On January 11, 1798, John Cabot and Joshua Fisher, having bought all shares of the company, sold the five and three-fourths acres of land to Samuel Blanchard of Wenham for $2630.29. Blanchard operated the factory on his own account until March 21, 1801, when he sold one-third to George S. Johonnut of Baltimore for $1,011.01. On March 1, 1813, George Johonnot purchased another third of the land for $333.33. The deed attached to this mentioned that the machinery within the buildings was formerly used for the manufacture of cotton. A time prior to that deed on 1813, the business had ceased and part of the machinery sold. It has been mentioned that the mill may have ceased operation during the Embargo of 1807 when commerce in Salem and Beverly was paralyzed. The old brick factory was burned on October 13, 1828.

=== The factory today ===
Today, the location of the factory is marked by a memorial stone at 42°34'21.52"N, 70°53'35.46"W. It is documented that the factory stood at Baker's Corner, which is the corner of Cabot and Dodge streets. The corner was the site of Baker's Inn. Across the street, roughly where Prinzi's Pizza is now is where the building stood. Oxen and horses used at the mill were watered from the pond nearby. The building no longer stands.

There are efforts being made locally to create an information display adjacent to the memorial stone to present information to the public.
