= Hugh Hill (privateer) =

American sea captain

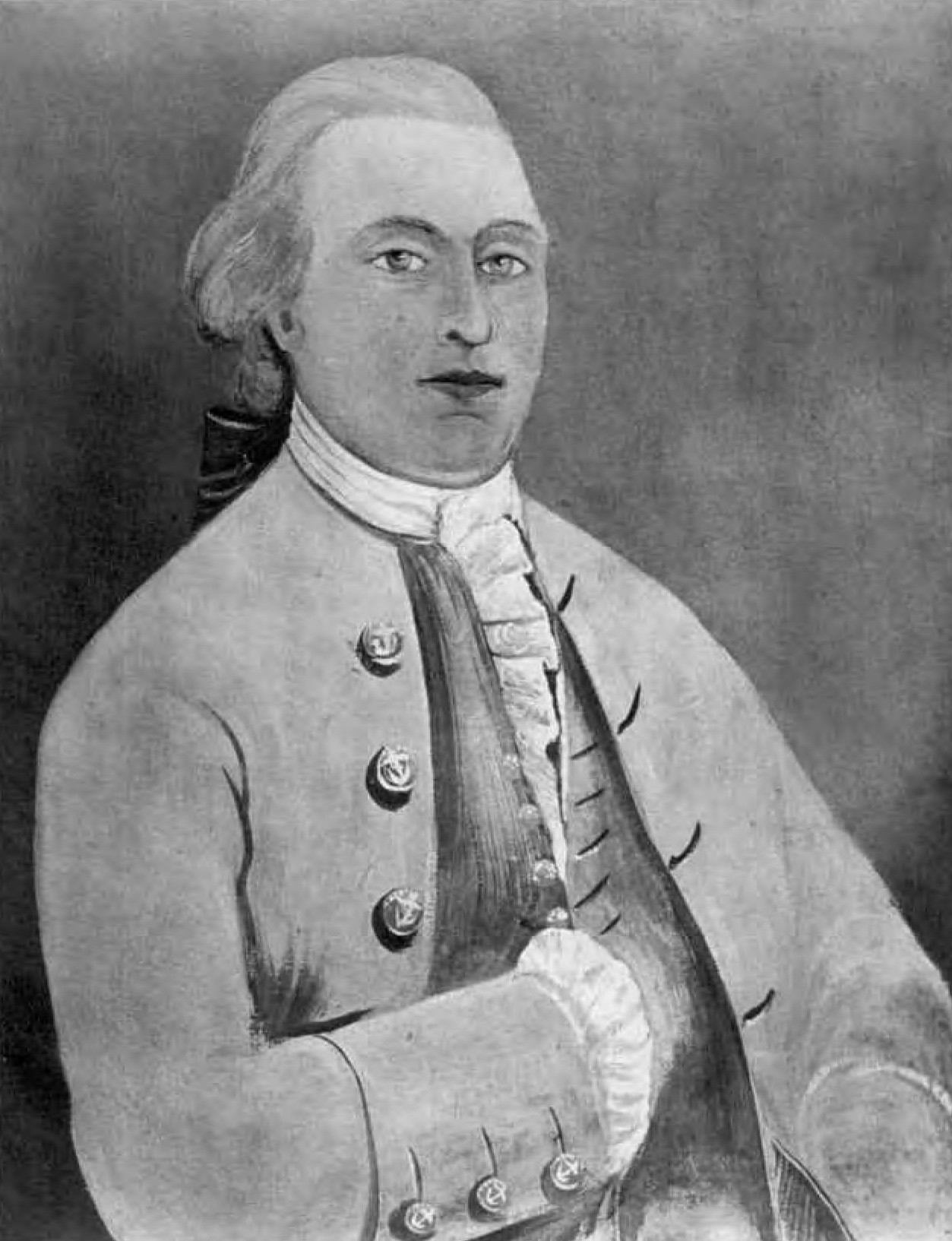
- Hugh Hill (1740–1829)
- Born: 1 August 1740; Carrickfergus, Ireland
- Died: 17 February 1829 (aged 88); Beverly, Massachusetts, U.S.
- Resting place: Beverly, Massachusetts, U.S. 42°33′0.36″N 70°52′15.96″W
- Citizenship: United States
- Known for: Privateer in the Revolutionary War
- Spouse(s): Hannah Hill (née Goudy); Jane Gardner Brown Hill
- Parent(s): John Hill; Elizabeth Hill (née Jackson)
- Relatives: Andrew Jackson (cousin)

Hugh Hill (1740–1829) was an Irish-born American sea captain based in Beverly, Massachusetts, best known for his successful privateering exploits during the American Revolutionary War. Through his maternal grandfather Hugh Jackson, he was a first cousin of President Andrew Jackson.

== Early life ==
Hugh Hill was born 1 August 1740 to John and Elizabeth Hill in Carrickfergus, County Antrim, Ireland, of Scotch-Irish ancestry. At the age of fifteen, Hill left home to join the English navy as a cabin boy. Without any formal schooling, Hill managed to acquire a rudimentary school education through the help of sailors. Upon leaving the naval service, Hill went to Marblehead, Massachusetts, where he married Hannah Goudy on 13 March 1766 at the age of 25. Not long afterward he moved to Beverly to the north where he found work as a mariner.

== Privateer activities ==
With a professed strong hatred of the British government, Hugh Hill was a strong proponent of the Patriot cause from the beginning. In 1775, he was named captain of the privateering vessel Pilgrim by the Cabot brothers of Beverly and sent to disrupt British activity in the Atlantic. In that same year he captured the British ship Industry, which he delivered to George Washington.

Over the span of the war, Hill went on to successfully capture a multitude of British merchant vessels with the Pilgrim and later the Cicero, which he was commissioned master of in 1781, on the account of the Cabots. Many of his successful captures were made off the coast of Great Britain and Ireland, and he earned a notoriously infamous reputation among British captains near there as a "scourge of the British coast." According to Beverly historian Edwin M. Stone, "probably more captured vessels were brought into this port than into any other in New England, the cargoes of which furnished important and seasonable supplies for the Continental Army."

Hill was known for his commanding presence, strong nerves, and craftiness on the open seas and was notable for his use of false flag operation while privateering, flying the British flag on his vessels as a decoy before unleashing the American flag when on the attack. While infamous within British circles, he was known to be humane to his prisoners.

In 1781, he captured the ship Mars in the Irish Channel which had on board the extensive and famous Philosophical Library of Dr. Richard Kirwan of Dublin. Upon bringing the plunder to Beverly, the library was auctioned off and later became a basis for the foundation of the Salem Athenaeum.

== Post-war life ==
Following the war, Hill went to Ireland with the Cicero and advertised the transport of passengers to America. In 1784, he brought back to America his aging parents along with his brothers and sisters. In 1794, he bought for his family the farming estate of Chipman Hill in North Beverly. Under his name he successfully operated a wharf and warehouse on Beverly Harbor, and set his brothers up in the business upon their arrival in America. Additionally, he maintained a 1780-built house on Front Street which still stands today. At this point his first wife Hannah appears to have died and he married his second wife, Jane Gardner Brown Hill (1772-1855). With Jane, he had five children. Meanwhile in 1810, his niece Hannah Hill set up in another house on Front Street, with neighbor Joanna Batchelder, one of the first Sunday schools in America.

== Death ==
Hugh Hill died a prominent citizen of Beverly at his Chipman Hill farm on 17 February 1829, at the age of 88. He is buried in the city's Central Cemetery in a family plot.

== Legacy ==
Due to his successful privateering efforts in the American War of Independence, Hill is remembered in Beverly as a Revolutionary War Hero whom, along with the launching of the Hannah in Glover's Wharf as the first official vessel of the Continental Navy, made the town notable during the conflict and era. In honor of him and other privateers, but with his visage most prominent, the Beverly Historical Society today operates a "Privateer Trail Walking Tour" during the summer through the Front Street area of Beverly where he owned his home and operated his business.

Chipman Hill, the site of Hill's farmstead in North Beverly, was later turned into the site of the Old Salem Reservoir, and now serves as the site of several businesses and institutions on Tozer and Sohier Roads and adjoins with the sites of Beverly High School and Beverly Hospital.
