= Thomas Somers (investor) =

American businessman

Thomas Somers was an English textile factory superintendent and was one of the original investors and architects for the Beverly Cotton Manufactory in Beverly, Massachusetts.

Thomas Somers had traveled, at his own expense, to England the fall of 1785 on behalf of the Tradesmen and Manufacturers of Baltimore, Maryland, in an attempt to procure the machines used for carding and spinning cotton. After some difficulty, he was able to leave England, having stolen descriptions and models of the machines used. He returned to Baltimore in the summer of 1786. Okay Shortly after Somers returned, he found out that the boat that was carrying much of his personal property during his stay in England had crashed at Cape Cod, Massachusetts. It is reported that he lost one-half of the property he brought with him.

Somers created a petition to the Legislature of Massachusetts requesting financial assistance in order to afford the equipment needed to begin manufacturing of his designs of a cotton mill. March 8, 1787, the Legislation granted Somers twenty pounds from the Public Treasury which was used to assist both Somers and the startup costs of the Beverly Cotton Manufactory.

There is some indication that Somers' contribution to the Beverly Cotton Manufactory was higher in price than what would have been reasonably expected, and that his grasp of the necessities of the Manufactory construction were overestimated.
