= David Wilkinson (machinist) =

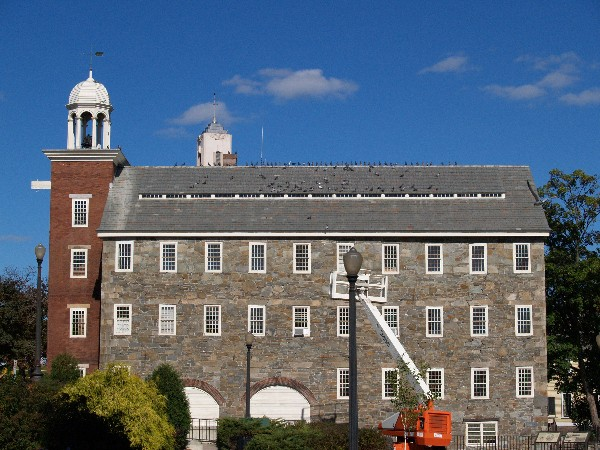
- Wilkinson Mill, built 1810
- Born: January 5, 1771; Smithfield, Rhode Island
- Died: February 3, 1852 (aged 81); Caledonia Springs, Province of Canada
- Occupation: Mechanical engineer
- Employer(s): David Wilkinson & Company
- Known for: invented a lathe for cutting screw threads

David Wilkinson (January 5, 1771 – February 3, 1852) was a U.S. mechanical engineer who invented a lathe for cutting screw threads, which was extremely important in the development of the machine tool industry in the early 19th century.

== Early life ==
David Wilkinson was born at Smithfield, Rhode Island in 1771, the son of Oziel Wilkinson, a skilled blacksmith who moved his family to Pawtucket in the 1780s.

About 1784, his father, Oziel, began making anchors in Pawtucket for the emerging shipbuilding industry. The shop was powered by water from the Blackstone River, and was located on the grounds of the present-day Slater Mill Historic Site.

== Industrial career ==
In 1790, Samuel Slater and his partners were interested in building a textile spinning mill in Pawtucket he sought the assistance of David Wilkinson and his father Oziel to produce the machinery for his new mill. They produced iron forgings and castings for Slater's carding and spinning machines.

[A]ll the turning of the iron for the cotton machinery built by Mr. Slater was done with hand chisels or tools in lathes turned by cranks with hand power.

— David Wilkinson

In 1793 Slater's operations were moved from a clothier's shop near the Pawtucket Falls to a new mill, which today is part of the Slater Mill Historic Site.

In 1795 Oziel Wilkinson built a rolling and slitting mill just south of Slater's cotton mill. Both mills were powered with water from the same trench.

== Wilkinson lathe ==
Textile machinery manufacturer and scientific writer Zachariah Allen had the following to say about Wilkinson's lathe in 1861:

“It has to this day proved the most effective tool placed within the control of mankind for shaping refractory metals and for accomplishing the triumph of mind over matter. The slide engine is employed in the great machine shops of America and Europe.”

Ross Thompson (2009) on the importance of Wilkinson's lathe:

'In his "Reminiscences", Wilkinson claimed his lathe was:

"worth all the other tools in use, in any workshop in the world, for finishing [machining] brass and iron"

On the versatility of his lathe Wilkinson said:

"The weighted side, the joint made by gravity, applies to planing, turning, and boring of metals of every kind, and in every way."

An 1848 report from the Committee on Military Affairs to the U.S. Senate highlighted the importance of Wilkinson's invention, for which the patent had expired in 1812:

"Being left open to general use, an invention so vastly important in its character could not fail to be sought after, not only in the public at large, but also by agents of the government engaged in the fabrication of arms of various descriptions; and hence we find the gauge and sliding lathe was early introduced and made use of by all the arsenals and armories of the United States."

The report went on to say 'Wilkinson was the "true and undisputed author" of the lathe, and that it was "indispensable" for making firearms, and that public armories used 200 lathes based on the invention. The report recommended a $10,000 reward, which he was given.

Wilkinson failed to generate much income from his lathe. Records exist for the sale of one lathe and a few parts.

David Wilkinson's lathe is often compared to Henry Maudslay's which is believed to have been invented a few years before Wilkinson's. Maudslay's lathe used change gears which allowed it to cut threads of various pitches, without which Wilkinson's could only cut a fixed pitch. Wilkinson's lathe could handle heavier work.

== Wilkinson Mill ==
In 1810, the present-day Wilkinson Mill was built near their existing rolling and slitting mill and Slater's cotton mill. Three and one-half stories tall and constructed from field stones, it contained a machine shop on the first floor and cotton spinning mill on the upper floors.

In 1829, during a depression in the textile industry, David Wilkinson was forced to sell his mills. He left Rhode Island settling initially in Cohoes, New York. In 1831 the mill was sold to William Field and Thomas LeFavour. The mill would later be used to produce woolen and knitted textiles. Between 1873 and 1887 Lorenzo P. Bosworth operated a machine shop in the mill. He produced machinery and tools for the leather and jewelry industries. A braiding company would occupy the second and third floors between 1884 and 1901.

The Wilkinson Mill was later sold to the Pawtucket Electric Lighting Company. It was also used as a furniture warehouse during the 20th century.

== Legacy ==
The Wilkinson Mill was restored in the early 1970s as part of the Slater Mill Historic Site in Pawtucket, Rhode Island. The watermill site currently features a working 16,000-pound breastshot water wheel that powers, via gear systems and leather pulleys, various drive shafts to operate machinery.

In 1977, the American Society of Mechanical Engineers (ASME) designated the Wilkinson Mill in Pawtucket, Rhode Island a National Historic Mechanical Engineering Landmark.

== See also ==
- Experiment (horse-powered boat), constructed by Wilkinson
