= George Cabot =

American politician

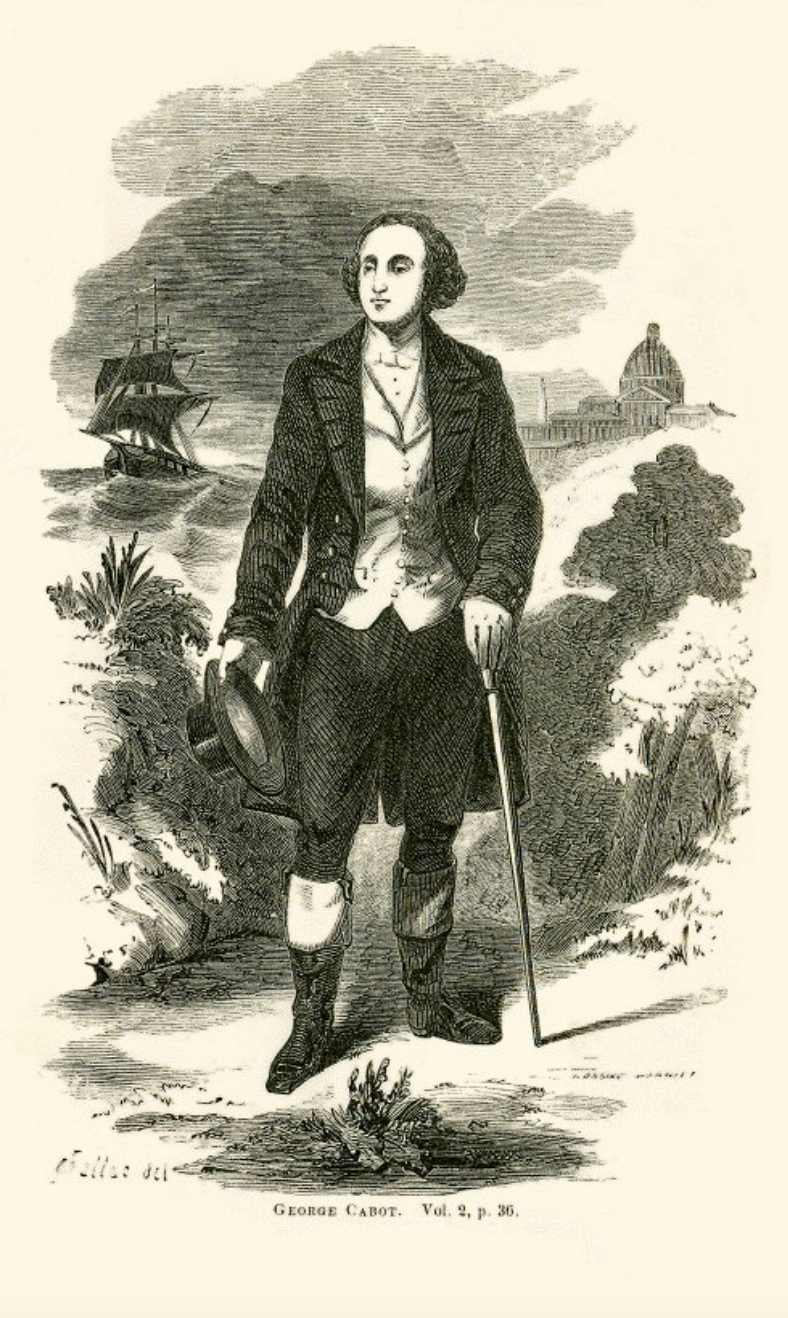
- Posthumous depiction c. 1856

United States Senator from Massachusetts
- In office March 4, 1791 – June 9, 1796
- Preceded by: Tristram Dalton
- Succeeded by: Benjamin Goodhue

Member of the Massachusetts Governor's Council
- In office 1808–1809
- Governor: James Sullivan; Levi Lincoln (acting)

Personal details
- Born: December 16, 1751 or December 3, 1752 Salem, Massachusetts
- Died: April 18, 1823 (aged 70) Boston, Massachusetts
- Party: Federalist
- Children: 4
- Education: Harvard University
- Occupation: Merchant, seaman, politician

George Cabot (1751 or 1752 – April 18, 1823) was an American merchant, seaman, and politician from Massachusetts. He represented Massachusetts in the U.S. Senate and was the presiding officer of the infamous Hartford Convention. During and after his term in the Senate, Cabot was a major figure in the Hamiltonian faction of the Federalist Party and was a vocal supporter of war with Revolutionary France.

== Early life ==
Cabot was born in Salem, Massachusetts. His father was Joseph Cabot, a ship merchant. His mother was Elizabeth Higginson. George was the seventh of ten siblings, including John Cabot (b. 1745), Joseph Cabot Jr. (b. 1746), and Samuel Cabot (b. 1758). The Cabot family is originally from Jersey and Norman-French.

In 1766, Cabot enrolled at Harvard College. After two years there, his father died. George inherited 600 pounds and rather than become a charge on his father's estate, dropped out to go to sea, where he became a cabin boy on the ship of his brother-in-law Joseph Lee. By the age of 21, he was captain of his own ship. While traveling, he became fluent in French and Spanish.

== Business career ==
In 1775, Cabot and Lee formed a partnership in Beverly, Massachusetts, as merchants, trading the same goods they had transported as sailors.

=== American Revolution ===
During the American Revolution, the Cabot family were ardent patriots. Cabot ships served as privateer vessels, raiding British merchants to support the revolutionary cause and turning a profit in the process. Some of their ships were captained by the famous privateer Hugh Hill.

Some time after the Revolution, Cabot's business took him to New York City, where he was acquainted with Alexander Hamilton, who became a lifelong friend and political ally. The visit strengthened Cabot's preference for a strong federal government and led to his founding membership in the Federalist Party.

His business interests were suspended in 1794, during his service as Senator.

== Early political career ==
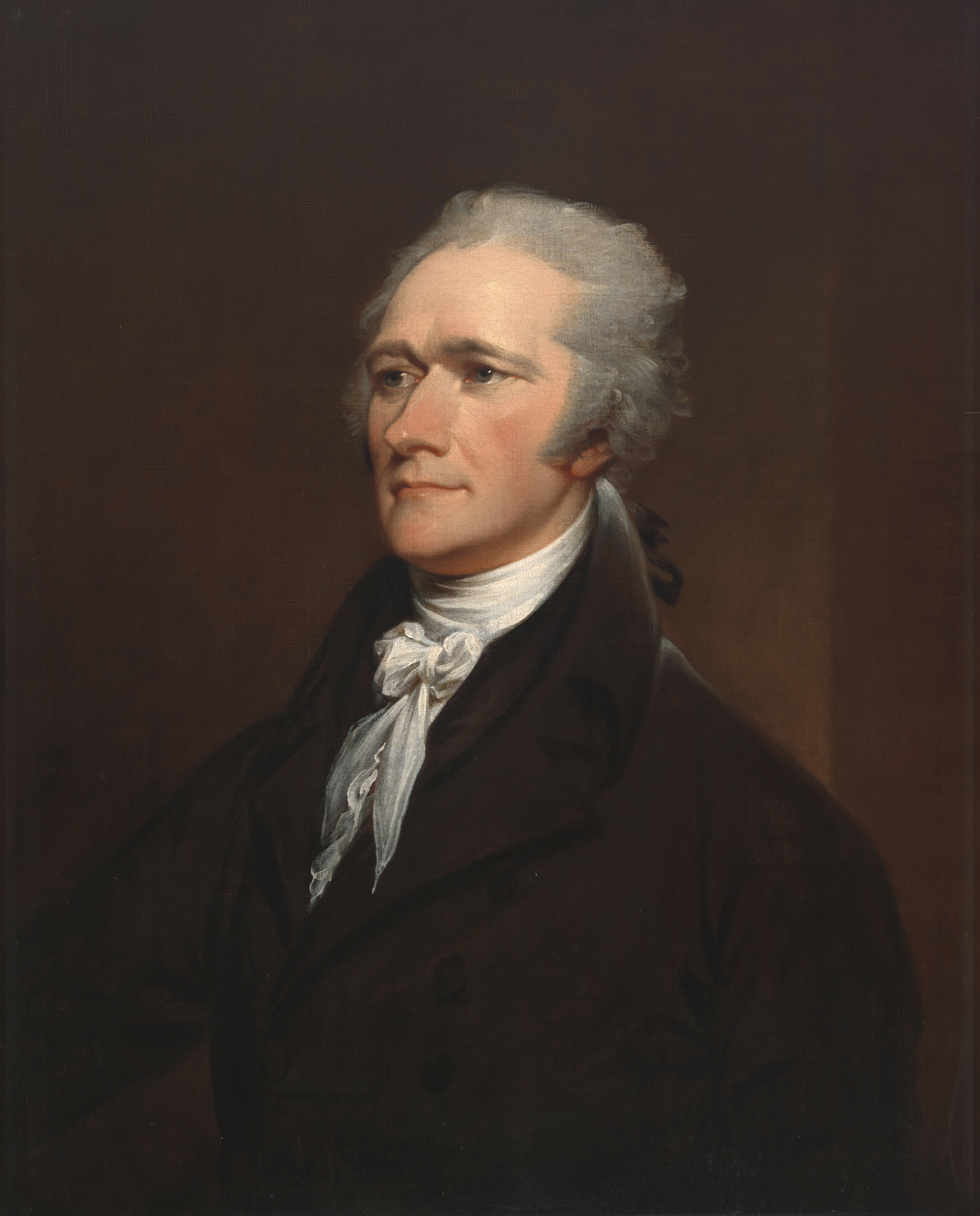
Cabot's early acquaintance and friendship with future Secretary of the Treasury Alexander Hamilton shaped his political career.

Cabot's political career began in 1775, when he became a member of the Massachusetts Provincial Congress. In 1777, Cabot was elected as Beverly town fire-ward and director and president of the Bridge Company, tasked with constructing the Essex Bridge, which first connected Beverly with Salem across the Danvers River.

In 1777, the town of Beverly voted to reject the proposed Massachusetts Constitution, and Cabot was a member of a committee selected to draft objections. He opposed the proposed system of weighted representation and price controls, but was unsuccessful. That constitution was ultimately rejected by voters.

In August 1780, he was elected to the convention for a new Massachusetts Constitution. Populist Governor John Hancock, who supported the failed 1778 Constitution, accused his conservative opponents of being controlled by an "Essex Junto," including Cabot, which soon became a popular invective metonym.

In 1788, Cabot was a delegate to the Massachusetts convention to ratify the new United States Constitution, which he strongly supported. Along with Rufus King, Theophilus Parsons, and Fisher Ames, he successfully engineered Massachusetts ratification by persuading Hancock and Samuel Adams to support ratification.

In 1789, President George Washington breakfasted with Cabot at the latter's Beverly home when he was in town inspecting the country's first cotton mill and the new Essex Bridge.

== U.S. Senate ==
=== 2nd United States Congress (1791–1793) ===
In 1791, midway through the first presidential term of George Washington, Cabot was elected to the U.S. Senate. During his time in the Senate, he was principally concerned with finance and commerce, and was a supporter of his friend Alexander Hamilton's policies as Secretary of the Treasury.

During his first Congress, Cabot was a member of the Committee on Appropriations and chair of the Committee on Fisheries. He became a founding member of the new Federalist Party, led by Hamilton and Vice President John Adams. Hamilton frequently consulted with Cabot on matters of revenue, commerce, and manufacturing. Cabot's bill to subsidize fishermen became a major feature of Hamilton's economic program.

Throughout the Congress, tensions with the Jeffersonian faction intensified both in the capital of Philadelphia and in the newspapers. Party differences were deepened by the ongoing French Revolution, which drew Jeffersonian support and Federalist revulsion. Cabot himself stood out as an ardent Francophobe, and by extension, an Anglophile. After the Genêt affair, Cabot called for the French ambassador's dismissal and personally persuaded Vice President Adams to urge Washington to remove Genêt.

=== 3rd United States Congress (1793–1795) ===
In his second Congress, Cabot opposed Secretary Jefferson's attempts at establishing favorable trade with France, blocking the election of Jeffersonian Albert Gallatin of Pennsylvania to the Senate. He remained a leader in matters of commerce and finance and helped pass a bill laying the groundwork for a national Navy. In 1793, he was named a director of the First Bank of the United States.

Amid rising United States tensions with Great Britain, Cabot joined Senators Rufus King, Oliver Ellsworth, and Caleb Strong in calling for the appointment of Hamilton as special minister to negotiate a treaty with Britain. However, the public clamor that would be aroused by Hamilton's appointment led Washington to appoint John Jay instead. Though he thought it less than ideal, Cabot was one of the most uncompromising defenders of the resulting Jay Treaty with Great Britain as the best possible compromise at a time when war would have destroyed the Union.

=== 4th United States Congress (1795–1796) ===
During the debate over the Jay Treaty in his final Congress, Jefferson accused Cabot of supporting the dissolution of the Union, based on Cabot's belief that rejection of the treaty would lead to ruinous war. Jefferson also quoted Cabot as supporting a "President for life and an hereditary Senate."

In May 1796, Cabot returned to Massachusetts and resigned from office, citing the growing bitterness and personal character of Philadelphia politics. He waited until his friend Benjamin Goodhue was elected as his successor, then promptly sent his resignation to the Massachusetts General Court. It became effective in June.

== John Adams era (1797–1801) ==
Shortly after Cabot's resignation from the Senate, fellow Massachusetts Federalist John Adams was elected to the presidency. Though he did not actively participate in the campaign, Cabot supported Adams over Hamilton's preferred choice, Charles Cotesworth Pinckney, the current Minister to France.

=== Quasi-War ===
As a private citizen, Cabot remained intensely interested in the progress of the French Revolution and intensely opposed to the Francophile policy of Thomas Jefferson, now serving as Vice President. He wrote that "the first and highest duty of the electors was to prevent the election of a French President." Hamilton and Fisher Ames each urged the appointment of Cabot as part of a three-man mission to France, but Washington and Adams each declined. Adams instead chose Elbridge Gerry, whose reputation in France, particularly with French Foreign Minister Charles Maurice de Talleyrand-Périgord, was more positive.

Cabot himself was opposed to the appointment of such a commission, believing that the time for negotiation with France had passed. After Pinckney's dismissal as Minister to France, Cabot called for war measures against France, including opposition to the establishment of any embassy whatsoever. He firmly believed that any continued diplomacy with France would only encourage Jacobinism in the United States.

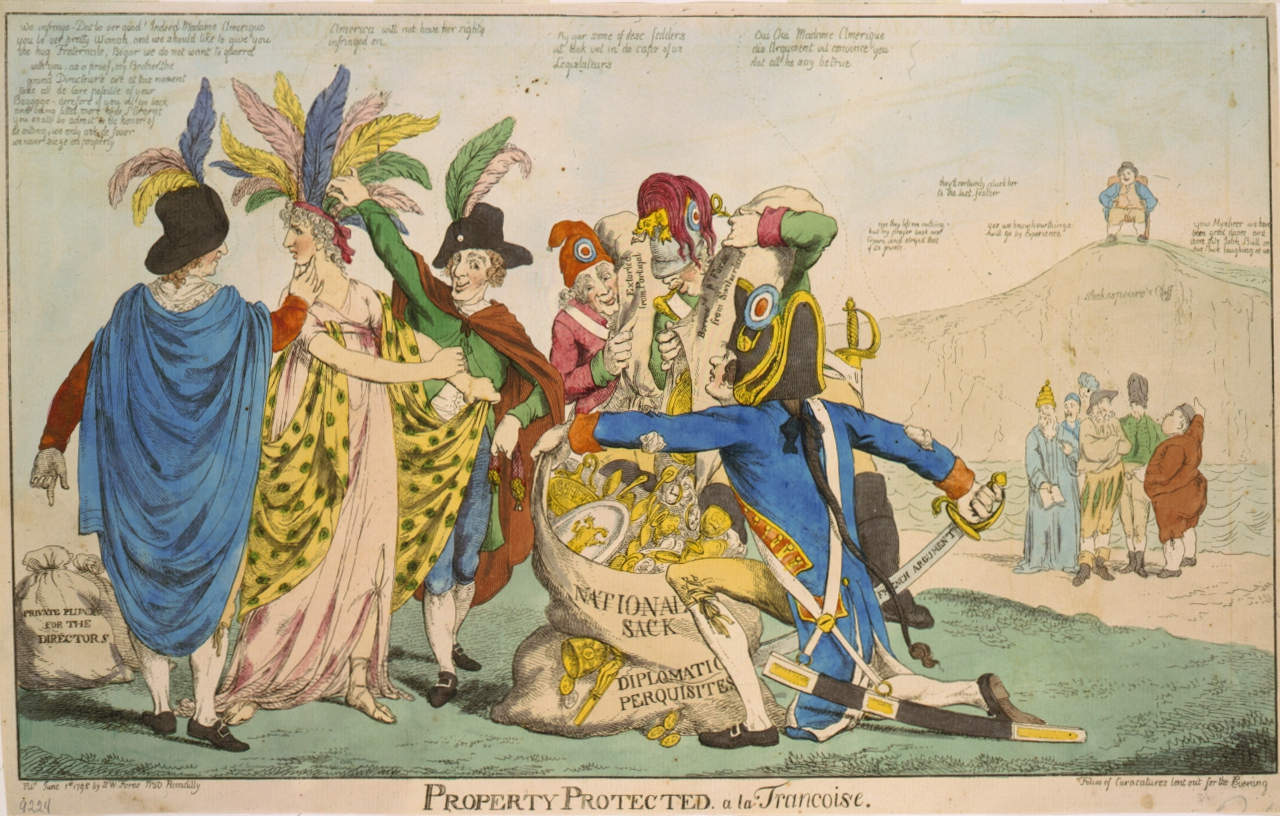
The XYZ Affair marked the peak of support for war with France, which Cabot actively promoted.

In the winter of 1797–98, tensions with France escalated. Cabot, along with Pickering, Ames, Oliver Wolcott, and James McHenry, formed the faction of "war Federalists" led by Hamilton. They opposed the moderate (mostly southern) Federalists and Jefferson's Republicans, who sought peace with France at any cost.

In March, President Adams declared to Congress that negotiations had failed and that the United States must arm for potential war. The revelation of the XYZ affair effectively silenced all opposition and enabled Federalists to pass legislation creating a separate Department of the Navy. Adams appointed Cabot as the first United States Secretary of the Navy, but Cabot refused the appointment. Benjamin Stoddert filled the position in his place.

Cabot became involved in the debate over the organization of a provisional army. Former President Washington suggested Hamilton, Pinckney, and former Secretary of War Henry Knox, in that order, serve as major generals. Despite this, Adams granted Knox the first rank. Cabot sided with Washington, Hamilton, and other leading Federalists in objecting to Knox's elevation; President Adams gave in, but the entire affair created divisions within the Federalists. Some Federalists suggested the Jeffersonian Elbridge Gerry, now returned from his mission to France, had undue influence over Adams's decision-making.

In 1799, Adams, without consulting his cabinet, appointed Minister to the Netherlands William Vans Murray to lead a commission to renew peace negotiations with France, disappointing the war Federalists. Cabot remained strictly opposed to any negotiation with France without first advances toward reconciliation by the French.

Despite his ardent opposition to Adams's policy toward France, Cabot sought to reconcile the factions within the Federalist Party, for fear of the party's destruction. Despite his efforts and frequent correspondence with leaders of both factions, the Federalist Party divided between the Adams and Pinckney-Hamilton campaigns through the remainder of 1799.

=== Alien and Sedition Acts ===
Cabot's distance from the Adams administration also grew over the Alien and Sedition Acts. Cabot defended John Marshall, a Federalist opponent of the Acts, to the shock of Cabot's friend Fisher Ames.

=== Campaign of 1800 ===
As the 1800 campaign approached and Adams prepared to seek a second term, tensions within the Federalist Party were exacerbated by the publication of the 1792 Tench Coxe letter, in which Adams insinuated that the Pinckney family were British sympathizers, and the death of President Washington. At this point, Adams dismissed Pinckney as Secretary of State; Cabot understood this as "the complete abandonment by Mr. Adams of all the best principles of the Federalist Party." Cabot was also distressed by the use of "British sympathies" as a bludgeon against critics of Adams.

When Adams returned to Quincy in the spring, Cabot made no effort to visit him.

While Hamilton openly supported Pinckney for President over Adams, Cabot felt such a course was impossible and instead supported an equal electoral vote for Adams and Pinckney, to be resolved by the House of Representatives and urged Hamilton not to attack Adams openly. Hamilton disregarded these pleas, publishing his attack on Adams. Though they remained friends, Cabot strongly admonished Hamilton for damaging Federalists' chances in the election.

== Jeffersonian era (1801–1811) ==
After Adams's loss in the 1800 election, Cabot withdrew from politics. He played no part in Hamilton's plot to elect Aaron Burr over Thomas Jefferson in the 1801 contingent election, though he still passively opposed Jefferson's administration. Though he supported the appointments of James Madison and Albert Gallatin to Jefferson's cabinet, Cabot saw the 1800 election as the total defeat of the Federalist Party, and his mantra became, "Things must grow worse before they are better."

Cabot tended to his Brookline farm for a time, but grew tired of the work and leased his estate to a tenant. He remained President of the U.S. Bank of Boston, and occasionally entertained friends who were in Boston on business.

The deaths of his son Edward in 1803 and his friend Alexander Hamilton in 1804 put Cabot in a period of mourning, both for his personal loss and the loss of any conceivable future for the Hamiltonians. Cabot sold some lands to provide for Hamilton's family.

Cabot opposed Jefferson's acquisition of the Louisiana Territory and his removals of Federalist appointees and judges, but resisted Timothy Pickering's calls for dissolution of the Union.

=== Tensions with England ===
In 1805, Cabot made his only public pronouncement during the Jefferson administration. He reluctantly led a committee of Boston merchants opposed to British policy of seizing American ships in commerce with France.

After the Battle of Trafalgar and Napoleon's declaration of the Continental System, Cabot privately adopted a stance of definite alliance with the British in opposition to Napoleonic France. After the 1807 Chesapeake–Leopard affair, Cabot urged forgiveness and acceptance of the British terms of reparation. Jefferson's response, instead, was the Embargo Act of 1807. Cabot, like most Federalists and most of New England, opposed Jefferson's embargo against Britain, which he believed was designed to draw the United States into a war with Great Britain and would injure American business.

=== Campaign of 1808 ===
The Embargo Act and the ensuing 1808 campaign drew Cabot and many other Federalists back into politics.

Cabot published and distributed a letter on behalf of Timothy Pickering, now representing Massachusetts in the Senate and the most prominent Federalist in public life. This pamphlet was widely read and revitalized support for the Federalists. Cabot, however, feared that Pickering's approach could revitalize accusations the Federalists were a "British faction" and wrote to him urging caution. When Pickering persisted, Cabot suppressed several anti-Jeffersonian diatribes from the Senator.

Nonetheless, Cabot could not remain withdrawn from public life. Though Federalists did not win a resounding victory in Massachusetts, the party won sufficient seats in the General Court to elect Cabot to a one-year term on the Governor's Council.

In the concurrent presidential election, Cabot advised against a union with the Clintonian faction of the Republican Party and any strategy that might suggest that Federalists supported dissolution of the Union or regional separatism, including Pickering's proposal to hire a French engineer to fortify the port of Boston, traditionally a duty of the national government. Though the Federalists were unsuccessful in electing a President, the party did succeed in forcing repeal of the Embargo Act, after which Cabot withdrew from public life again. He withdrew further after the death of his eldest son, Charles, in 1811.

== War of 1812 ==
Cabot opposed the War of 1812 from the outset as unjust and wicked and publicly determined to refrain from aiding its prosecution in any way. However, he refrained from political commentary until 1814.

=== Hartford Convention ===
Cabot was elected as a delegate to the Hartford Convention, organized in 1814 by Federalist politicians of New England who were unhappy with the conduct of the War of 1812, in particular the conscription of state militias into national service. On his journey to Hartford, Cabot was joined by Dr. James Jackson. Cabot reportedly told Jackson he was going to Hartford to "keep you young hot-heads from getting into mischief."

Cabot chaired the secretive meeting and later certified the official proceedings and platform of the convention, which called for constitutional reforms but stopped short of calling for secession. In his role, Cabot remained reticent regarding his own views, drawing the ire of more radically anti-war Federalists like Pickering and John Lowell Jr.

After the war ended, the convention was widely viewed as unconstitutional, bordering on treasonous. The Treaty of Ghent, signed while the convention was meeting, effectively ended both the Federalist Party and Cabot's political career. He made no further public appearances and no longer maintained his correspondence with public figures, save a brief discussion with Pickering weighing the merits of free trade.

== Retirement ==
After the Hartford Convention, Cabot returned to a life largely of leisure. He remained president of the Boston Marine Insurance Company, which kept him in touch with his merchant colleagues. He was an active member of Boston society and devoted much of his time to his wife, daughter Elizabeth, and son Henry who lived nearby with his family.

== Personal life ==
Cabot steadfastly refused to have his portrait painted during his lifetime; most depictions of him are posthumous. He was described by contemporaries as tall and "powerfully built." Samuel Griswold Goodrich, a witness to the Hartford Convention, described him as bearing a striking resemblance to George Washington.

Cabot was raised as a member of the Congregational Church of New England but later in life became a Unitarian.

He was averse to public speaking but considered an excellent conversationalist in private. Among his close friends was Josiah Quincy II, who later became President of Harvard University. Historian George Bancroft credited Cabot with encouraging him to study abroad at the University of Göttingen, where he was among the first Americans awarded a Ph.D.

He was elected a fellow of the American Academy of Arts and Sciences in 1788.

=== Family ===
Cabot married his second cousin Elizabeth Higginson in 1774. They had four children:

- Charles (d. 1811)
- Henry
- Edward (d. 1803)
- Elizabeth

Charles became a merchant like his father, taking long voyages to the East Indies. Henry and Edward both began their careers in Boston, in a law office and counting-house, respectively. Edward died in 1803. Charles died of consumption in Havana in 1811. Henry and Elizabeth lived into adulthood.

Elizabeth married John Thornton Kirkland, the fifteenth President of Harvard University.

Through Henry's daughter Anna, George Cabot was the great-grandfather of Henry Cabot Lodge, who held Cabot's seat in the United States Senate from 1893 until his death in 1924. Lodge's grandson Henry Cabot Lodge Jr. also represented Massachusetts in the Senate from 1937 to 1943 and again from 1947 to 1953.

In 1795, Cabot was briefly the guardian of Georges Washington de La Fayette, son of the Marquis de Lafayette, who had fled France to live in the United States in exile. Lafayette lived in Boston under the assumed name "Motier" and studied at Harvard College. Lafayette later entered the care of Hamilton before finally being adopted by Washington until he could return to France.

=== Residence ===
In 1794, Cabot moved his family from Beverly to Brookline, Massachusetts, where he built an estate named "Greenhill." Among his guests there was Supreme Court Justice James Iredell. In 1803, to permit his daughter Elizabeth to enter society, Cabot sold his Brookline estate and moved to Boston, where he spent the rest of his life. After Fisher Ames died on July 4, 1808, Cabot hosted his funeral in his home.

== Death ==
In 1821, Cabot suffered his first case of kidney stones and suffered from them for the remaining two years of his life.

He died in Boston, Massachusetts, on April 18, 1823, and was buried the Granary Burying Ground. He was later reinterred in Mount Auburn Cemetery in Cambridge, Massachusetts.

== Legacy ==
Cabot's only full-length biography was published by his great-grandson Henry Cabot Lodge in 1877. Lodge also named his son George Cabot Lodge.

U.S. Senate
Preceded by Tristram Dalton	U.S. senator (Class 1) from Massachusetts; 1791–1796; Served alongside: Caleb Strong	Succeeded by Benjamin Goodhue
