= Slater Mill =

Historic place in Pawtucket, Rhode Island, US

- Old Slater Mill
- U.S. National Register of Historic Places
- U.S. National Historic Landmark District
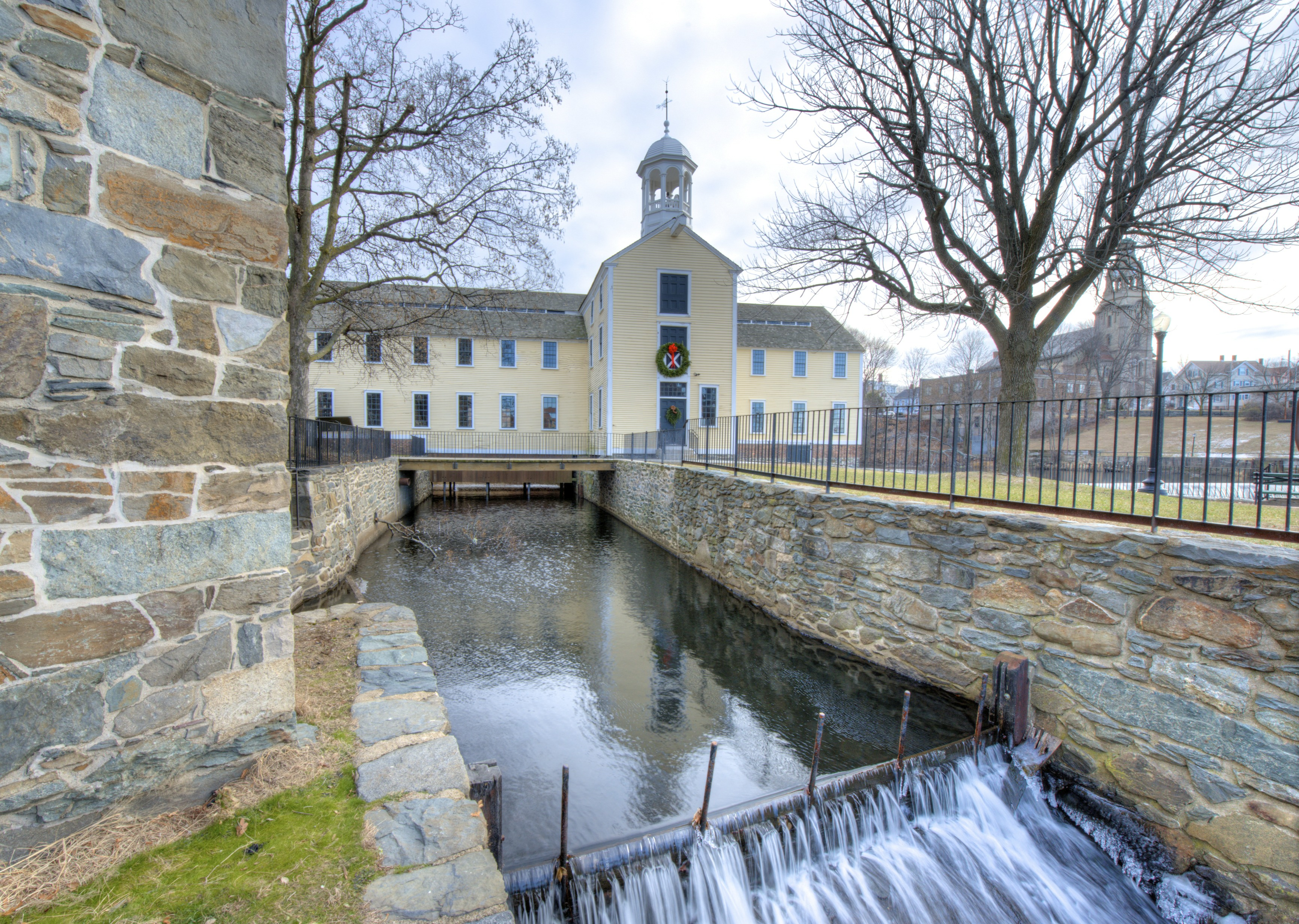
- Location: Roosevelt Avenue, Pawtucket, Rhode Island
- Coordinates: 41°52′39″N 71°22′57″W
- Area: 4.23 acres (1.71 ha)
- Built: 1793
- NRHP reference No.: 66000001

Significant dates
- Added to NRHP: November 13, 1966
- Designated NHLD: November 13, 1966

The Slater Mill is a historic water-powered textile mill complex on the banks of the Blackstone River in Pawtucket, Rhode Island, modeled after cotton spinning mills first established in England. It is the first water-powered cotton spinning mill in America to use the Arkwright system of cotton spinning as developed by Richard Arkwright.

The mill's founder, Samuel Slater, apprenticed as a young man with industrialist Jedediah Strutt in Belper, England. Shortly after emigrating to the United States, Slater was hired by Moses Brown of Providence, Rhode Island to produce a working set of machines necessary to spin cotton yarn using water power. Construction of the machines was completed in 1793, as well as a dam, waterway, waterwheel, and mill.

Manufacturing was based on Arkwright's cotton spinning system, which included carding, drawing, and spinning machines. Slater initially hired children and families to work in his mill, establishing a pattern that was replicated throughout the Blackstone Valley and known as the "Rhode Island System".

It was later eclipsed by Francis Cabot Lowell's Waltham System. The Slater mill and surrounding area were the site of early labor resistance. This included the first factory strike in the United States, which was led in 1824 by young women workers.

Slater Mill was added to the National Register of Historic Places and designated a National Historic Landmark on November 13, 1966, the first property to be listed on the register. In December 2014, the mill and historic district were added to the newly formed Blackstone River Valley National Historical Park.

== Architectural history ==
The original portion of the Slater Mill built in 1793 was six bays long and two stories tall. Several additions were made beginning in 1801, and a second added in 1835. Between 1869 and 1872, a large addition was made to the north end of the mill. Cotton spinning continued until 1895, when such production had largely shifted to the American South. After that the mill was used for various industrial purposes until 1923. The building had suffered numerous fires in the past, and two fires occurred in 1912 which precipitated awareness of the building and the need for its preservation.

== Museum ==
In 1921, the non-profit Old Slater Mill Association was founded with the purpose of saving the historic Mill. Efforts to restore the mill began in 1923; modern additions to the structure were removed, restoring the mill to its 1835 appearance. In 1955, it opened as a museum. Restoration of the nearby Wilkinson Mill (built 1810–1811) was completed in 1978 as part of the Slater Mill site.

The Slater Mill site serves as a museum, educational center, and music venue, which "celebrates innovation and the entrepreneurial spirit by engaging audiences in relevant cultural, historic, and artistic endeavors". It includes five acres of land on both sides of the Blackstone River, a dam on the river, two historic mills (the Slater Mill and Wilkinson Mill), and the Sylvanus Brown House (built in 1758 but moved to this site in the 1960s).

The Slater Mill and other key buildings that are part of the Old Slater Mill Historic District were acquired by the National Park Service in 2021 as part of a new national park.

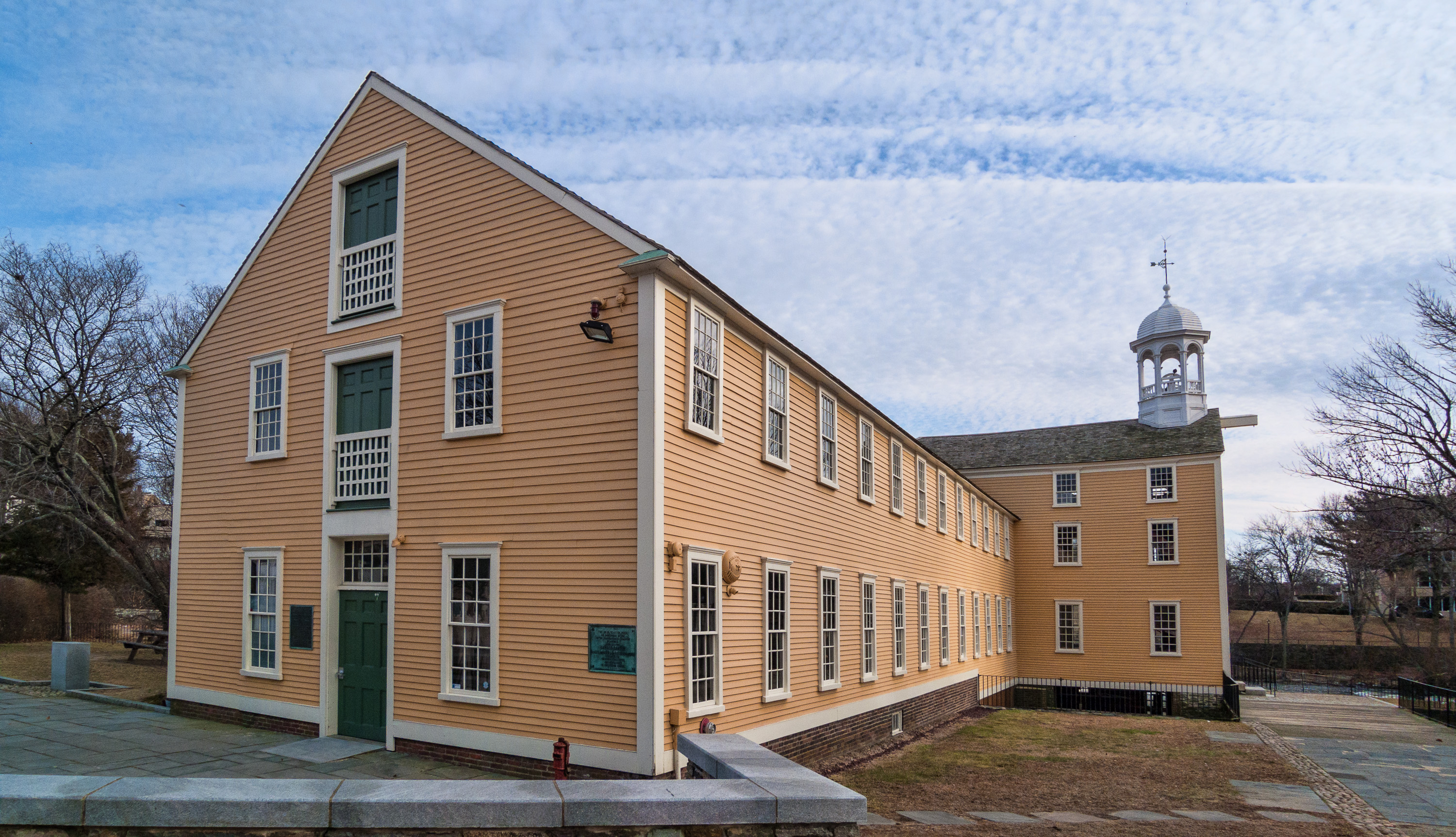
Slater Mill (1793)

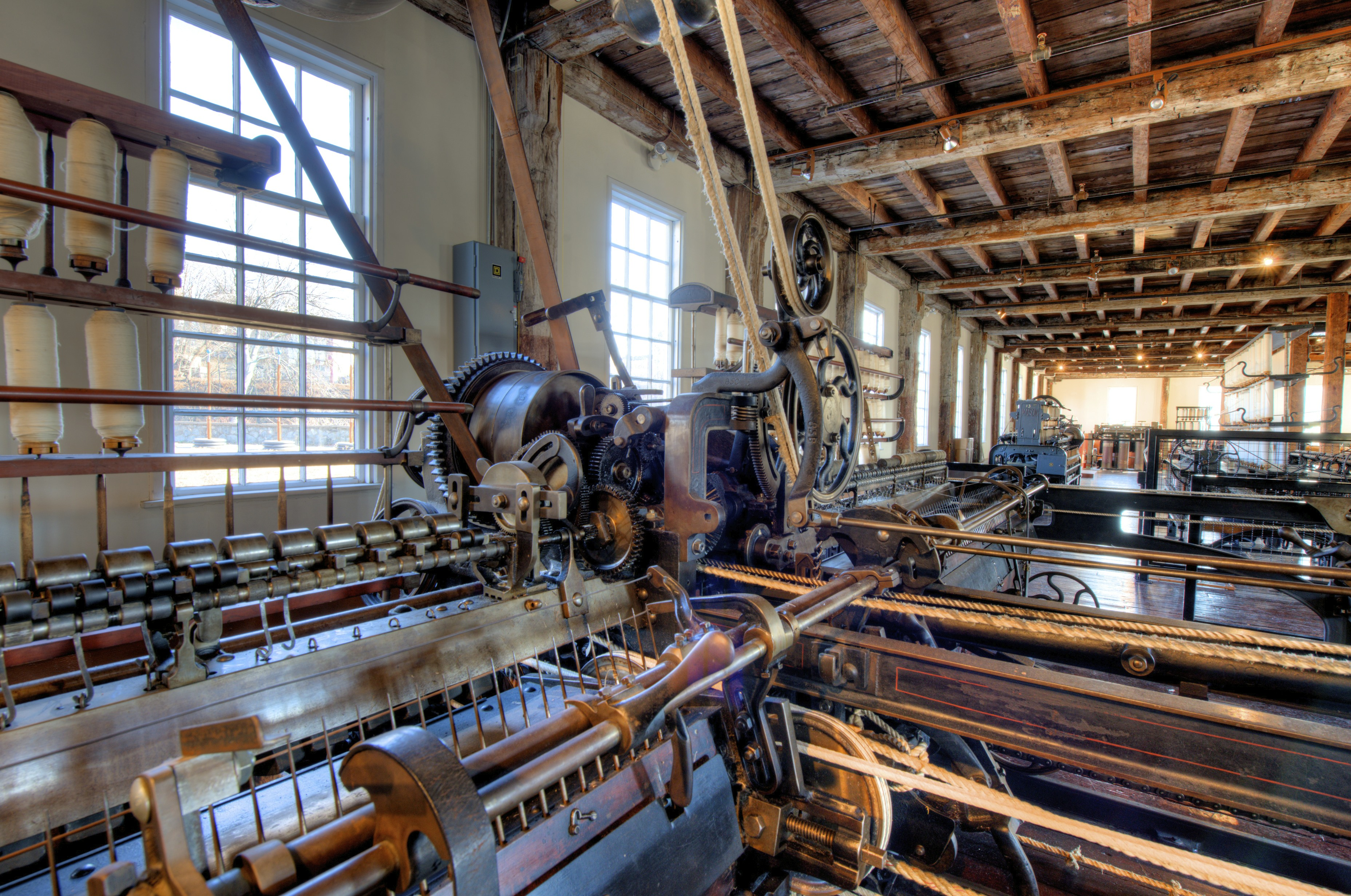
A spinning mule in Slater Mill

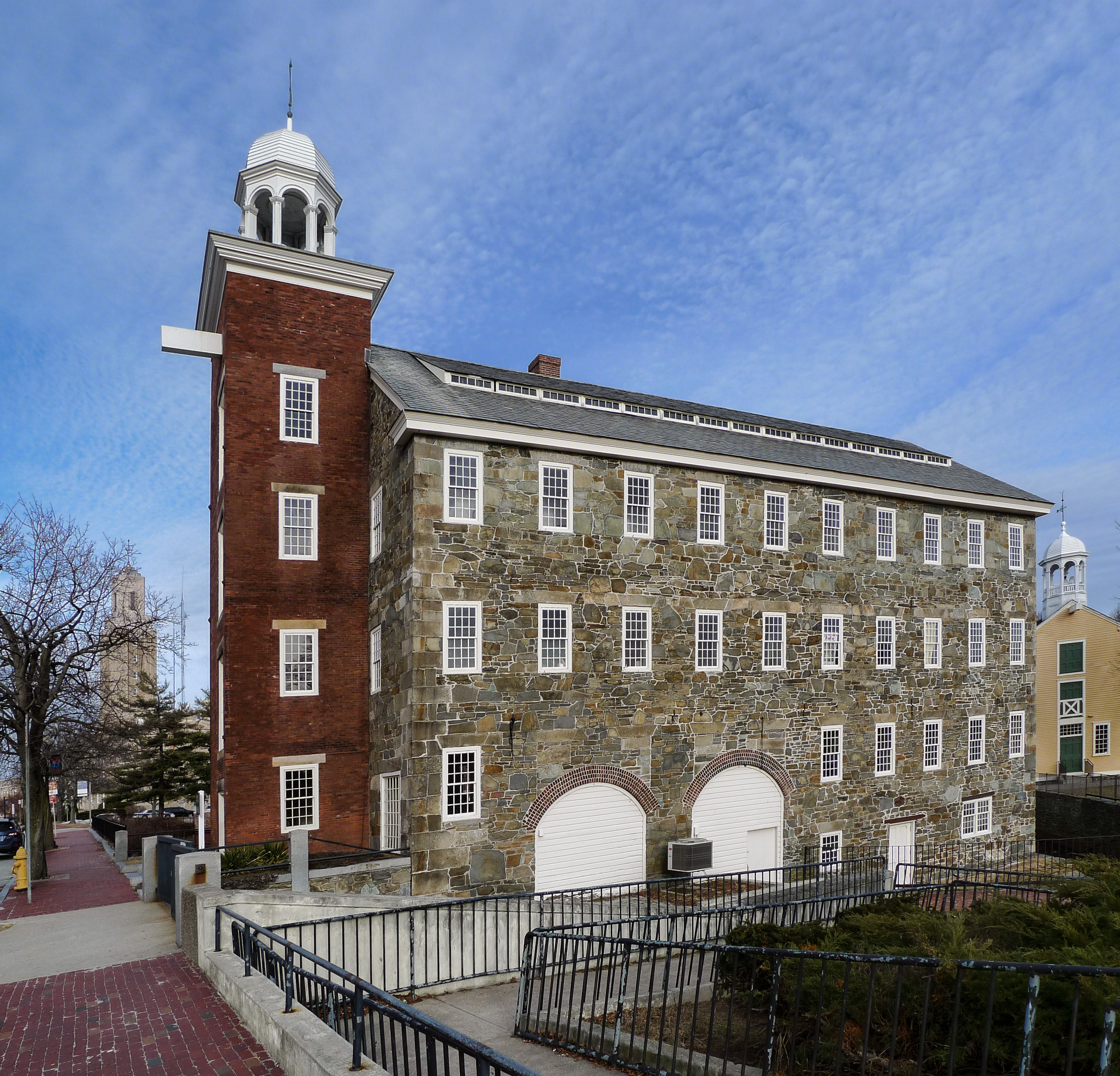
Wilkinson Mill (1810–11)

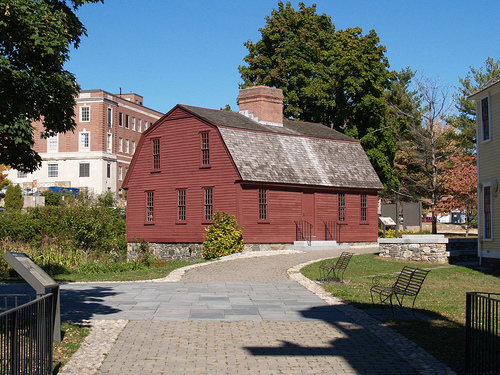
Sylvanus Brown House

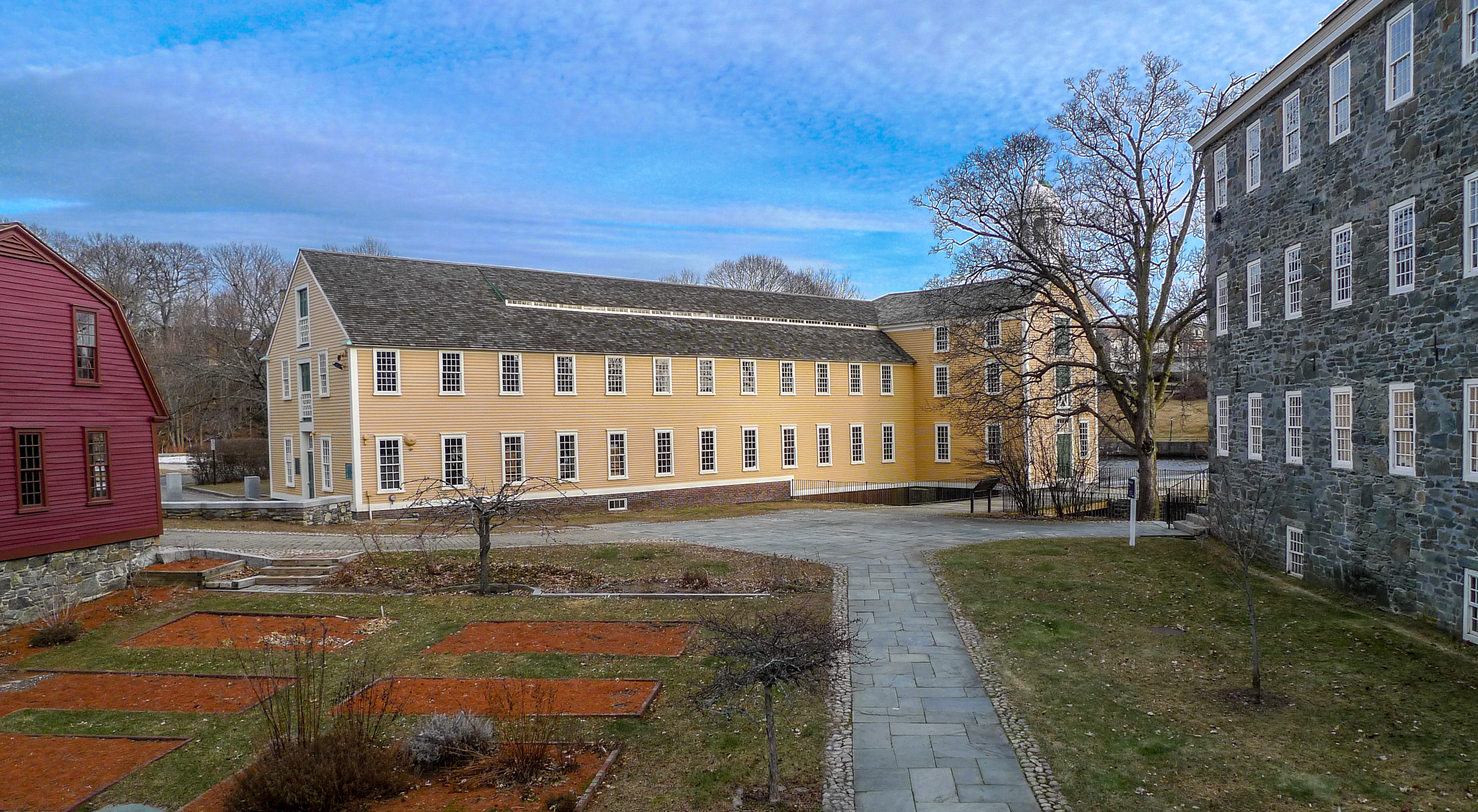
View of the site

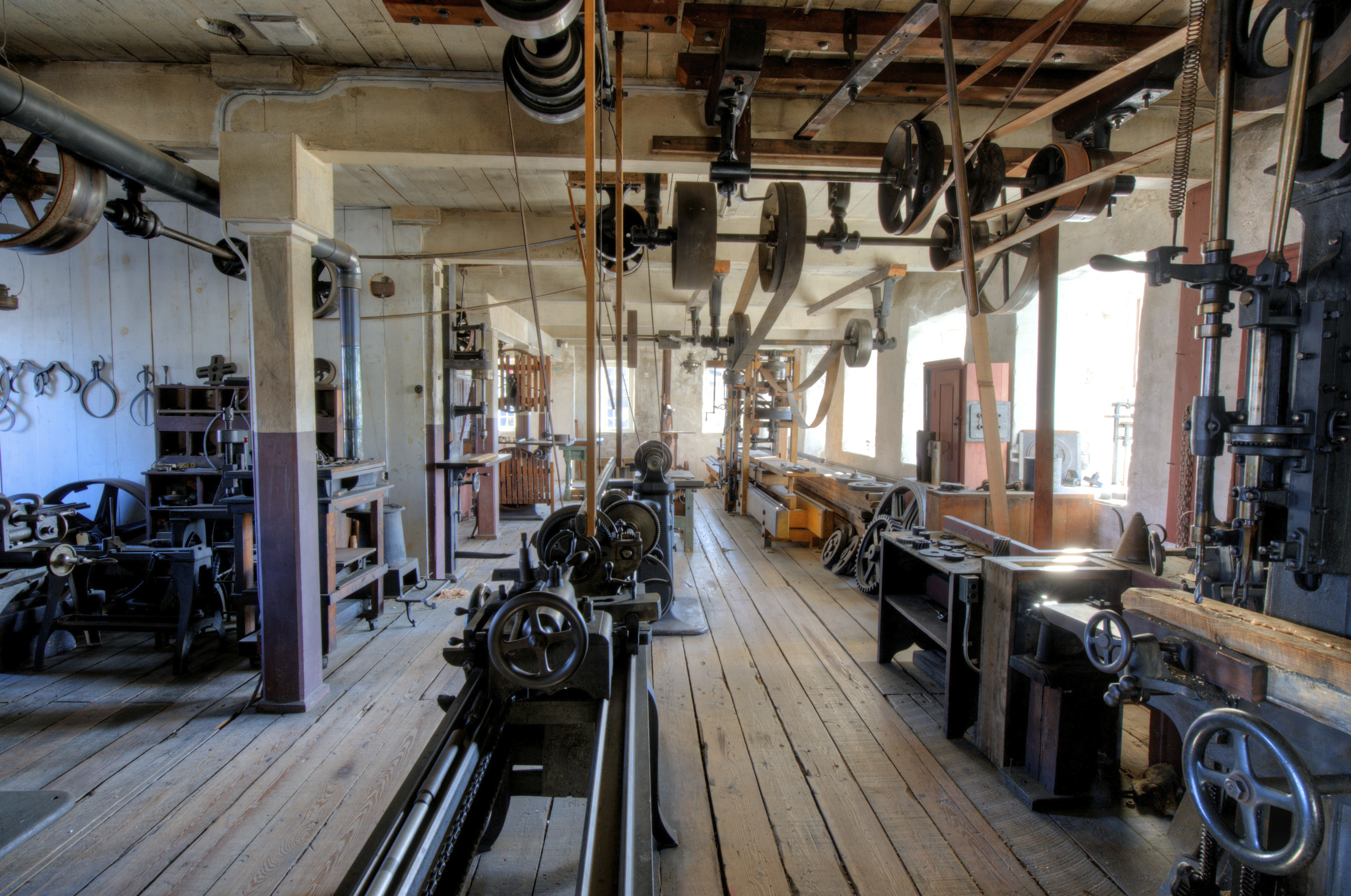
The Wilkinson Machine Shop

== See also ==
- Blackstone River Valley National Heritage Corridor
- David Wilkinson
- Derwent Valley Mills
- Hannah Slater
- List of National Historic Landmarks in Rhode Island
- National Register of Historic Places listings in Pawtucket, Rhode Island
