= 1788–89 United States presidential election in Massachusetts =

- December 18, 1788 (popular vote); January 7, 1789 (legislative)
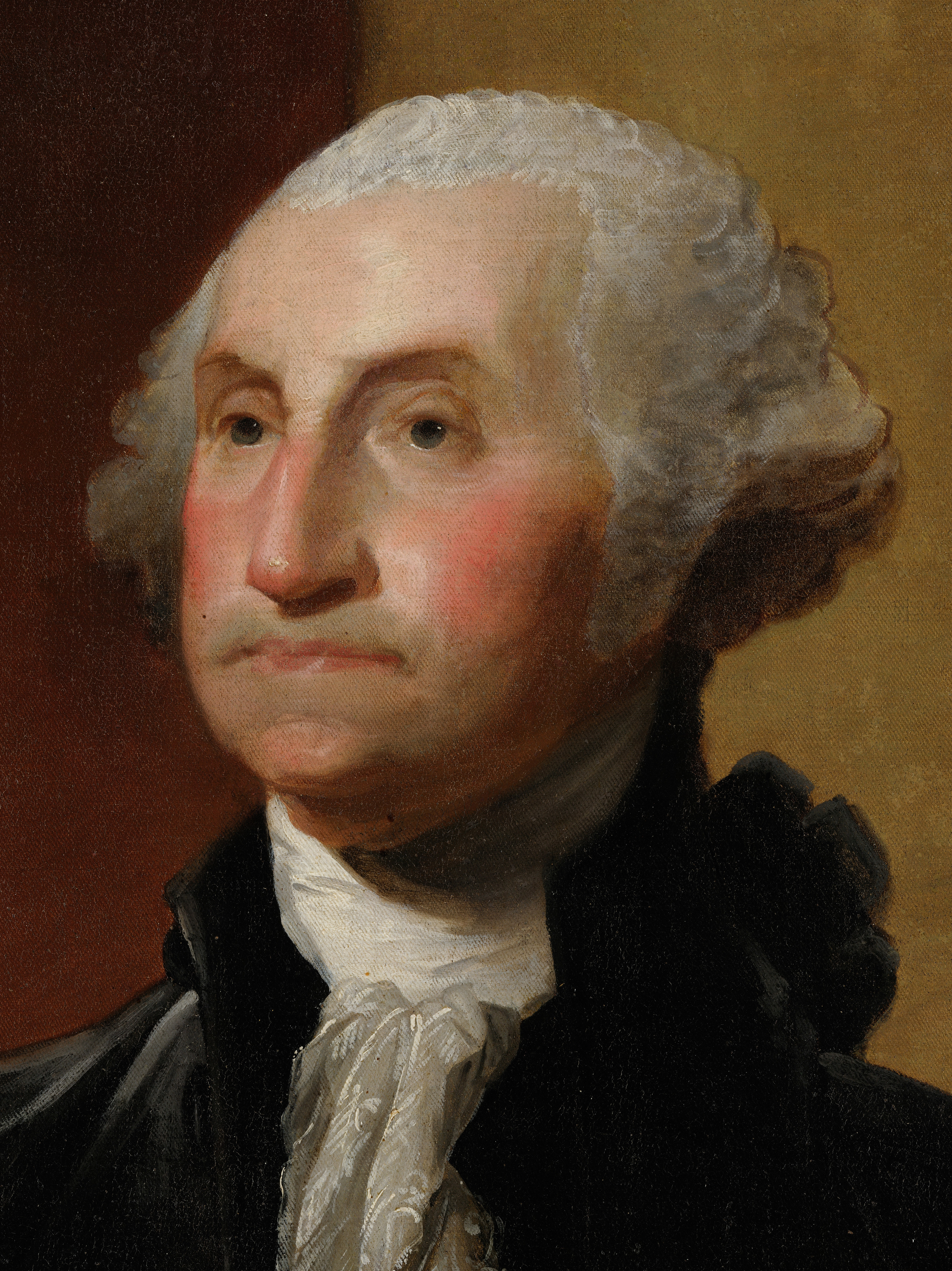

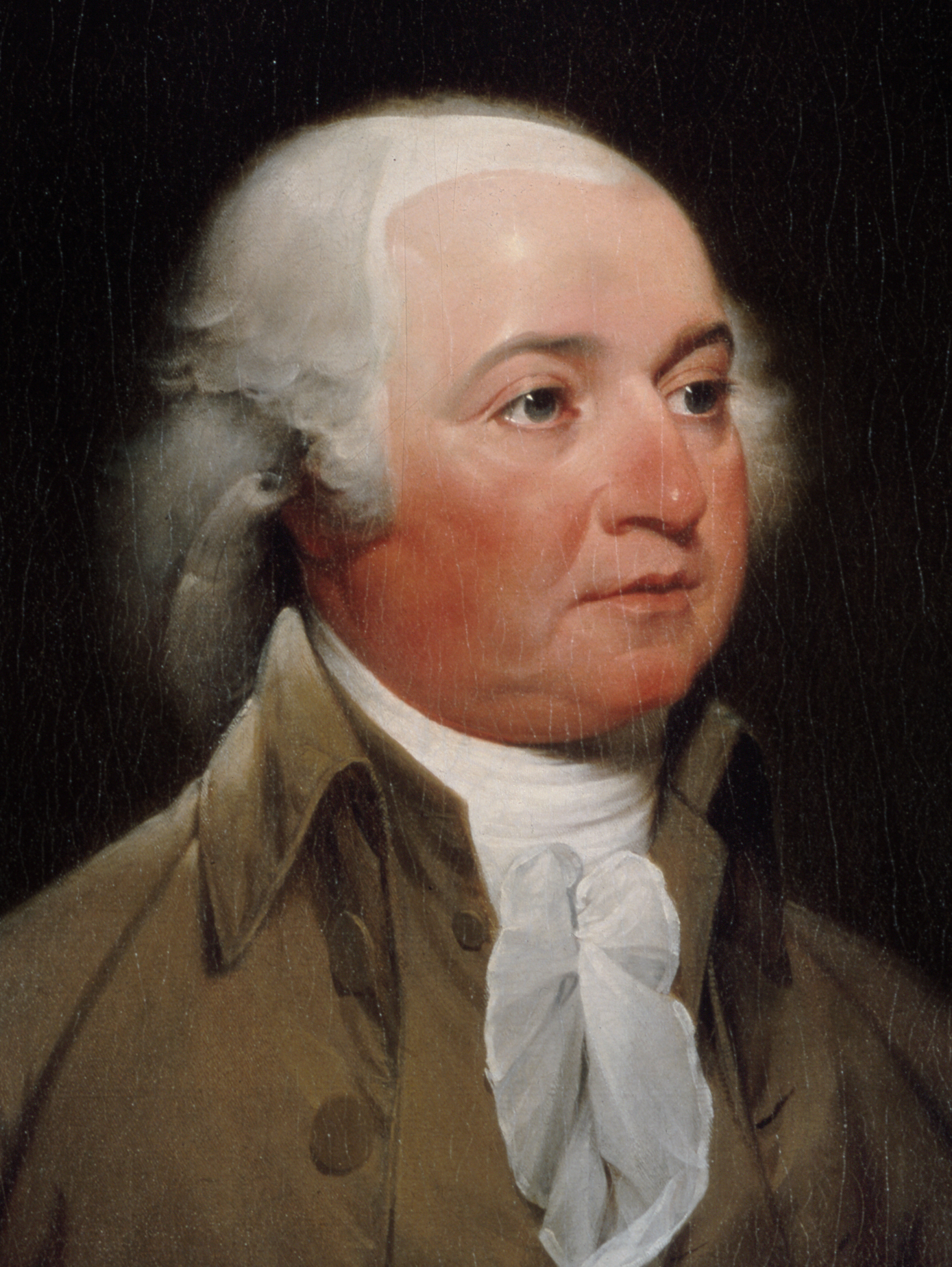
Nominee	George Washington	John Adams
Party	Independent	Federalists
Home state	Virginia	Massachusetts
Electoral vote	10	10
Popular vote	8,636	—
Percentage	100.00%	—
County results
Federalists
50–60%
60–70%
80–90%
90–100%
Anti-Federalists
60–70%
President before election
Office established
Elected President
George Washington
Independent

A presidential election was held in Massachusetts on December 18, 1788, and January 7, 1789, as part of the 1788–89 United States presidential election. Federalists led the polls in the first round of voting in each of the state's eight electoral districts. The Massachusetts General Court subsequently chose one elector from among the leading candidates in each district and appointed two further electors to represent the state at-large. All 10 electors voted for George Washington and John Adams.

Federalists won the 1788 Massachusetts elections, re-electing the incumbent governor John Hancock and electing majorities in the Massachusetts Senate and the House of Representatives. Federalist legislators proceeded to divided the state into eight electoral districts, with each district choosing one elector in the upcoming presidential election. While the district system paid lip service to democratic representation, the map adopted by the General Court was gerrymandered to overrepresent the Federalist-leaning counties in Eastern Massachusetts.

Washington was widely expected to be the first choice of the Electoral College in the first elections held under the Constitution of the United States. Some uncertainty persisted concerning the choice of the first vice president, however, due partly to the electoral system established by Article II of the Constitution. Under this system, each elector voted for two candidates; the candidate with the largest majority was elected president, and the runner-up vice president. With Washington likely to become president, many observers expected Adams to receive the other vote of most of the electors. Some, such as Alexander Hamilton, feared Adams's popularity would be so great as to result in a tied vote, throwing the election to the United States House of Representatives. Hamilton believed this event would be deeply embarrassing to the new government and personally intervened with the electors to urge them not to vote for Adams.

More than 200 candidates received votes in the first round. Voters in each district voted for two candidates, with the two highest-placed candidates advancing to a runoff in the General Court. The electors appointed by the General Court met on February 4, 1789, and voted for Washington and Adams.

== General election ==
=== Summary ===
Massachusetts chose eight electors from single-member districts and two additional electors to represent the state at-large. Early election laws required voters to elect the members of the Electoral College individually, rather than as a block. The following table compares the sum of the votes for the leading Federalist and Anti-Federalist electors in each township to give an approximate sense of the statewide popular vote.

1788–89 United States presidential election in Massachusetts
Party	Candidate	Votes	%
Federalists	George Washington	6,720	77.81
Anti-Federalists	George Washington	1,916	22.19
Total	George Washington	8,636	100.00
Total votes		8,636	100.00

=== Results by county ===
1788–89 United States presidential election in Massachusetts by county
County	George Washington Federalists		George Washington Anti-Federalists		Margin		Total
County	Votes	%	Votes	%	Votes	%	Total
Barnstable	137	100.00	—		137	100.00	137
Berkshire	517	81.80	115	18.20	402	63.60	632
Bristol	567	65.10	304	34.90	263	30.20	871
Cumberland	146	100.00	—		146	100.00	146
Dukes (Note: Including votes for Cornelius Durham, a Federalist. Candidates with no known faction affiliation received between 13 and 53 votes in Dukes County.)	2	100.00	—		2	100.00	2
Essex	1,047	86.67	161	13.33	886	73.34	1,208
Hampshire	1,056	86.99	158	13.01	898	73.98	1,214
Lincoln	163	38.35	262	61.65	-99	-23.30	425
Middlesex	958	88.46	125	11.54	833	76.92	1,083
Nantucket	147	100.00	—		147	100.00	147
Plymouth	341	98.84	4	1.16	337	97.68	345
Suffolk	691	82.66	145	17.34	546	65.32	836
Worcester	748	57.63	550	42.37	198	15.26	1,298
York	200	68.49	92	31.51	108	36.98	292
TOTAL	6,720	77.81	1,916	22.19	4,804	55.62	8,636

=== Results by district ===
1788–89 United States presidential election in Massachusetts by district
District	E.V.	George Washington Federalists			George Washington Anti-Federalists			Margin		Total
District	E.V.	Votes	%	E.V.	Votes	%	E.V.	Votes	%	Total
At-large electors	2	*		2	*		—	*		*
Barnstable & Plymouth	1	478	99.17	1	4	0.83	—	474	98.34	482
Berkshire & Hampshire	1	1,573	85.21	1	273	14.79	—	1,300	70.42	1,846
Bristol, Dukes, & Nantucket	1	716	70.20	1	304	29.80	—	412	40.40	1,020
Cumberland, Lincoln, & York	1	509	58.98	1	354	41.02	—	155	17.96	863
Essex	1	1,047	86.67	1	161	13.33	—	886	73.34	1,208
Middlesex	1	958	88.46	1	125	11.54	—	833	76.92	1,083
Suffolk	1	691	82.66	1	145	17.34	—	546	65.32	836
Worcester	1	748	57.63	1	550	42.37	—	198	15.26	1,298
TOTAL	10	6,720	77.81	10	1,916	22.19	0	4,804	55.62	8,636

==== Barnstable and Plymouth ====
1788–89 United States presidential election in Massachusetts: Barnstable and Plymouth
Party	Candidate	Votes	%
Federalists	Samuel Savage (Note: Federalist correspondent in 1788.)	373	37.95%
Federalists	William Sever	319	32.45%
Federalists	Nathan Cushing	92	9.36%
Federalists	Joshua Thomas	61	6.21%
Federalists	Shearjashub Bourne	54	5.49%
Federalists	Solomon Freeman	32	3.26%
Federalists	William Cushing	17	1.73%
Federalists	Daniel Howard	12	1.22%
Federalists	Thomas Davis	6	0.61%
Anti-Federalists	James Warren (Note: Anti-Federalist leader in 1788.)	4	0.41%
Anti-Federalists	Francis Shurtleff	3	0.31%
Unknown	John Gray	3	0.31%
Unknown	Samuel Freeman	2	0.20%
Federalists	David Thacher	1	0.10%
Federalists	George Partridge	1	0.10%
Federalists	Joseph Cushing	1	0.10%
Unknown	Joseph Smith	1	0.10%
Federalists	Samuel Jackson	1	0.10%
Total votes		983	100.00%

==== Berkshire and Hampshire ====
1788–89 United States presidential election in Massachusetts: Berkshire and Hampshire
Party	Candidate	Votes	%
Federalists	Samuel Henshaw	668	17.55%
Federalists	Elijah Dwight	557	14.63%
Federalists	Samuel Lyman (Note: Federalist candidate for the U.S. House of Representatives in 1789.)	484	12.72%
Federalists	Thompson J. Skinner	456	11.98%
Unknown	Samuel Fowler (Note: Federalist Party candidate for the Massachusetts Senate in 1796 and 1799.)	200	5.25%
Federalists	John Hastings	168	4.41%
Anti-Federalists	William Whiting (Note: Anti-Federalist candidate for the U.S. House of Representatives in 1788 and 1789.)	114	3.00%
Federalists	Theodore Sedgwick	109	2.86%
Federalists	Thomas Ives (Note: Opponent of Shays's Rebellion; afterwards a Federalist.)	96	2.52%
Unknown	David Smead (Note: Federalist Party candidate for the Massachusetts Senate in 1796.)	91	2.39%
Anti-Federalists	Oliver Phelps (Note: Anti-Federalist correspondent in 1788.)	80	2.10%
Anti-Federalists	William Bodman	66	1.73%
Unknown	Simeon Strong (Note: Federalist official during the 1790s.)	64	1.68%
Federalists	William Williams (Note: Federalist candidate for the U.S. House of Representatives in 1789.)	61	1.60%
Federalists	William Shepard	59	1.55%
Unknown	John Bliss	47	1.23%
Unknown	Reuben Kimman	46	1.21%
Unknown	Hugh MacLellan	36	0.95%
Unknown	Elijah Williams	34	0.89%
Unknown	Lott Stoddard	32	0.84%
Unknown	William Walker	30	0.79%
Federalists	Ebenezer Mattoon	28	0.74%
Federalists	Noah Goodman	28	0.74%
Anti-Federalists	Ephraim Fitch	26	0.68%
Anti-Federalists	John Bacon (Note: Anti-Federalist correspondent in 1788.)	22	0.58%
Anti-Federalists	Phineas Stebbins	19	0.50%
Unknown	Joshua Henshaw	18	0.47%
Unknown	Eleazer Porter	17	0.44%
Unknown	Reuben Mason	16	0.42%
Federalists	John Ashley	15	0.39%
Unknown	Levi Shepard	14	0.37%
Unknown	Timothy Robinson	13	0.34%
Federalists	Woodbridge Little (Note: Federalist partisan during the 1780s.)	12	0.32%
Unknown	John Brown	11	0.29%
Unknown	Moses Bliss	11	0.29%
Anti-Federalists	Thomas Lusk	11	0.29%
Unknown	Chapin	7	0.18%
Unknown	Jonathan Hale	7	0.18%
Unknown	Justin Ely	6	0.16%
Unknown	John Williams	5	0.13%
Anti-Federalists	Ebenezer Peirce	4	0.11%
Unknown	Ely Parsons (Note: Leader in Shays's Rebellion.)	3	0.08%
Unknown	Ebenezer Hunt	2	0.05%
Unknown	Jahleel Woodbridge	2	0.05%
Unknown	John Worthington	2	0.05%
Unknown	Joshua Shaw	2	0.05%
Unknown	Oliver Smith	2	0.05%
Federalists	Elisha Porter	1	0.03%
Unknown	James Coe	1	0.03%
Unknown	Park	1	0.03%
Anti-Federalists	William Lyman (Note: Anti-Federalist candidate for the U.S. House of Representatives in 1788.)	1	0.03%
Federalists	William Pynchon	1	0.03%
Total votes		3,806	100.00%

==== Bristol, Dukes, and Nantucket ====
1788–89 United States presidential election in Massachusetts: Bristol, Dukes, and Nantucket
Party	Candidate	Votes	%
Federalists	Elisha May	537	25.55%
Federalists	Walter Spooner	357	16.98%
Federalists	Samuel Tobey	332	15.79%
Anti-Federalists	Holder Slocum (Note: Alias Holder Housen.)	300	14.27%
Anti-Federalists	Phanuel Bishop	295	14.03%
Federalists	David Cobb (Note: Federalist candidate for the U.S. House of Representatives in 1788.)	162	7.71%
Unknown	James Athearn	53	2.52%
Unknown	John Worth	34	1.62%
Unknown	Beriah Norton	13	0.62%
Federalists	George Leonard (Note: Federalist candidate for the U.S. House of Representatives in 1788.)	12	0.57%
Federalists	Cornelius Dunham	2	0.10%
Federalists	William Bailies	2	0.10%
Unknown	Daniel Leonard	1	0.05%
Unknown	Jerathmeel Bowers	1	0.05%
Unknown	Zephaniah Leonard	1	0.05%
Total votes		2,102	100.00%

==== Cumberland, Lincoln, and York ====
1788–89 United States presidential election in Massachusetts: Cumberland, Lincoln, and York
Party	Candidate	Votes	%
Federalists	David Sewall	231	14.56%
Anti-Federalists	Daniel Cony (Note: Anti-Federalist leader in 1788.)	213	13.43%
Federalists	Nathaniel Wells	196	12.36%
Unknown	Josiah Thacher (Note: Federalist Party candidate for the Massachusetts Senate in 1796.)	168	10.59%
Anti-Federalists	William Widgery	157	9.90%
Federalists	William Lithgow (Note: Federalist candidate for the U.S. House of Representatives in 1790.)	127	8.01%
Anti-Federalists	Samuel Thompson	69	4.35%
Federalists	Peleg Wadsworth	43	2.71%
Anti-Federalists	Samuel Nasson	43	2.71%
Unknown	Edmund Phinney	37	2.33%
Federalists	Stephen Longfellow	37	2.33%
Unknown	Henry Dearborn (Note: Anti-Administration (later Democratic-Republican) U.S. representative from 1793 to 1797.)	35	2.21%
Federalists	Dummer Sewall	34	2.14%
Federalists	Thomas Rice	29	1.83%
Unknown	William Gorham	24	1.51%
Federalists	Thomas Cutts	22	1.39%
Unknown	William Cunningham	22	1.39%
Unknown	Tristram Jordan	20	1.26%
Unknown	Enoch Ilsley (Note: Co-founder of the separatist Cumberland Gazette.)	16	1.01%
Federalists	George Thatcher	16	1.01%
Unknown	Ichabod Goodwin (Note: Celebrated the adoption of the United States Constitution.)	12	0.76%
Federalists	Joseph Noyes	10	0.63%
Federalists	Joshua Bailey Osgood (Note: A debtor who expressed direct support for the United States constitution, in a letter of correspondence to federalist George Thatcher, dated October 8th, 1787.)	7	0.44%
Unknown	John Frost	6	0.38%
Unknown	John Lewis	5	0.32%
Unknown	James Parrington	2	0.13%
Unknown	Daniel Davis	1	0.06%
Unknown	Edward Cutts	1	0.06%
Anti-Federalists	James Carr	1	0.06%
Federalists	John Fox	1	0.06%
Unknown	John Swett	1	0.06%
Total votes		1,586	100.00%

==== Essex ====
1788–89 United States presidential election in Massachusetts: Essex
Party	Candidate	Votes	%
Federalists	George Cabot	955	38.42%
Federalists	Samuel Phillips Jr.	676	27.19%
Federalists	Jonathan Titcomb	323	12.99%
Federalists	Azor Orne	184	7.40%
Anti-Federalists	Samuel Holten (Note: Anti-Federalist candidate for the U.S. House of Representatives in 1788.)	155	6.23%
Federalists	Benjamin Goodhue	100	4.02%
Federalists	Samuel Phillips	30	1.21%
Federalists	Benjamin Greenleaf	14	0.56%
Unknown	John Pickering	11	0.44%
Federalists	John Choate	8	0.32%
Unknown	Jonathan Gardner	7	0.28%
Federalists	Jonathan Jackson	5	0.20%
Anti-Federalists	Thomas Kitteridge	4	0.16%
Anti-Federalists	Daniel Kilham (Note: Anti-Federalist leader in 1788.)	2	0.08%
Anti-Federalists	Israel Hutchinson	2	0.08%
Unknown	Nathan Banks	2	0.08%
Unknown	Aaron Cheever	1	0.04%
Federalists	Jonathan Greenleaf (Note: Federalist candidate for the Massachusetts Senate in 1788.)	1	0.04%
Unknown	Nathan Goodale	1	0.04%
Unknown	Nathaniel Peaslee Sargent	1	0.04%
Unknown	Samuel Fowler	1	0.04%
Unknown	Squires Shove	1	0.04%
Federalists	Theophilus Parsons	1	0.04%
Unknown	Timothy Dexter	1	0.04%
Total votes		2,486	100.00%

==== Middlesex ====
1788–89 United States presidential election in Massachusetts: Middlesex
Party	Candidate	Votes	%
Federalists	Francis Dana	572	23.96%
Federalists	John Brooks	338	14.16%
Federalists	Nathaniel Gorham	333	13.95%
Federalists	Eleazer Brooks	267	11.19%
Unknown	Oliver Prescott (Note: Opponent of Shays's Rebellion.)	259	10.85%
Federalists	Joseph B. Varnum	182	7.62%
Unknown	William Winthrop (Note: Party affiliation unknown during this election, but ran explicitly as a Democratic-Republican in 1799. Brother of prominent Anti-Federalists James Winthrop. No Federalists (United States) shift noted or recorded during all years of service.)	87	3.64%
Anti-Federalists	Elbridge Gerry (Note: Voted against ratifying the United States Constitution. One of two delegates to the Constitutional Convention to refuse to sign the finished document. Unsuccessful Anti-Federalist candidate for governor of Massachusetts in 1788.)	78	3.27%
Unknown	Joseph Harmon	66	2.76%
Federalists	Ebenezer Bridge (Note: Federalist candidate for the Massachusetts Senate in 1788.)	46	1.93%
Unknown	Loammi Baldwin (Note: Opponent of Shays's Rebellion.)	30	1.26%
Anti-Federalists	Marshall Spring	28	1.17%
Anti-Federalists	James Winthrop (Note: Anti-Federalist leader in 1788.)	24	1.01%
Federalists	Abraham Fuller	19	0.80%
Unknown	Joseph Curtis	18	0.75%
Unknown	James Russell	17	0.71%
Federalists	John Pitts	7	0.29%
Anti-Federalists	Walter McFarland (Note: Anti-Federalist candidate for the Massachusetts Senate in 1789.)	7	0.29%
Unknown	Aaron Johnson	1	0.04%
Federalists	Asahel Wheeler	1	0.04%
Federalists	Benjamin Brown	1	0.04%
Unknown	Chambers Russell	1	0.04%
Unknown	Duncan Ingraham	1	0.04%
Unknown	Francis Faulkner	1	0.04%
Unknown	Joseph Lee	1	0.04%
Unknown	Parker Vasmens	1	0.04%
Federalists	William Hull (Note: Federalist candidate for the U.S. House of Representatives in 1789.)	1	0.04%
Total votes		2,387	100.00%

==== Suffolk ====
1788–89 United States presidential election in Massachusetts: Suffolk
Party	Candidate	Votes	%
Fusion	Jabez Fisher	801	44.50%
Federalists	Caleb Davis	585	32.50%
Anti-Federalists	Thomas Dawes (Note: Voted to ratify the United States Constitution.)	132	7.33%
Federalists	James Bowdoin	46	2.56%
Federalists	Benjamin Lincoln	43	2.39%
Federalists	William Heath	39	2.17%
Federalists	Cotton Tufts	36	2.00%
Unknown	Stephen Metcalf (Note: Federalist Party candidate for the Massachusetts Senate in 1796.)	31	1.72%
Federalists	Charles Jarvis	23	1.28%
Unknown	Oliver Wendell (Note: Federalist Party candidate for the Massachusetts Senate in 1796.)	21	1.17%
Unknown	John Metcalf	10	0.56%
Anti-Federalists	John Winthrop (Note: Anti-Federalist Massachusetts representative in 1788. Voted to ratify the U.S. Constitution.)	8	0.44%
Federalists	Richard Cranch	6	0.33%
Anti-Federalists	Samuel Adams (Note: Anti-Federalist leader in 1788. Voted to ratify the U.S. Constitution.)	5	0.28%
Federalists	Fisher Ames	4	0.22%
Unknown	Ebenezer Thayer Jr.	2	0.11%
Unknown	James Humphrey	2	0.11%
Unknown	Lemuel Kollock	2	0.11%
Unknown	Elias Parkman	1	0.06%
Federalists	John Lowell	1	0.06%
Unknown	Nathaniel Bailey	1	0.06%
Unknown	Norton Brailsford	1	0.06%
Total votes		1,800	100.00%

==== Worcester ====
1788–89 United States presidential election in Massachusetts: Worcester
Party	Candidate	Votes	%
Federalists	Moses Gill (Note: Federalist candidate for the Massachusetts Senate in 1788.)	340	13.70%
Unknown	Abel Wilder (Note: Opposed clemency for participants in Shays's Rebellion.)	335	13.50%
Federalists	John Sprague	281	11.32%
Federalists	Timothy Paine (Note: Federalist candidate for the U.S. House of Representatives in 1788.)	191	7.70%
Federalists	Artemas Ward	176	7.09%
Federalists	Samuel Baker	163	6.57%
Anti-Federalists	Amos Singletary	154	6.20%
Unknown	Jonathan Warner	144	5.80%
Anti-Federalists	Martin Kinsley	135	5.44%
Anti-Federalists	Peter Pennaman (Note: Anti-Federalist candidate for the Massachusetts Senate in 1789.)	123	4.96%
Anti-Federalists	Timothy Fuller	104	4.19%
Anti-Federalists	Samuel Willard	91	3.67%
Anti-Federalists	John Fessendon (Note: Anti-Federalist candidate for the Massachusetts Senate in 1789.)	71	2.86%
Anti-Federalists	Jonathan Grout	69	2.78%
Unknown	Samuel Curtis (Note: Listed as being "absent" from the vote on ratification.)	65	2.62%
Unknown	Seth Washburn (Note: Federalist Party candidate for the Massachusetts Senate in 1811.)	55	2.22%
Unknown	Henry Bromfield (Note: Federalist Party partisan in the 1790s.)	41	1.65%
Anti-Federalists	John Black	32	1.29%
Anti-Federalists	Jeremiah Learned	30	1.21%
Anti-Federalists	John Taylor	30	1.21%
Federalists	Levi Lincoln, Sr. (Note: Supported ratification of the United States Constitution.)	25	1.01%
Unknown	Daniel Clarke	24	0.97%
Anti-Federalists	Stephen Maynard	24	0.97%
Federalists	David Wilder	23	0.93%
Unknown	Joseph Allen (Note: Federalist Party U.S. representative from 1809 to 1811.)	20	0.81%
Unknown	Caleb Ammidown	16	0.64%
Unknown	Joseph Dorr	14	0.56%
Unknown	Samuel Crosby	12	0.48%
Unknown	Timothy Newell (Note: Opponent of Shays's Rebellion.)	12	0.48%
Unknown	Samuel Danky	10	0.40%
Unknown	Andrew Peters	9	0.36%
Anti-Federalists	Josiah Whitney	6	0.24%
Unknown	Benjamin Haywood	3	0.12%
Unknown	Ebenezer Learned	3	0.12%
Unknown	Josiah Whiting	3	0.12%
Unknown	Park Holland	2	0.08%
Anti-Federalists	David Bigelow	1	0.04%
Unknown	David Taylor	1	0.04%
Unknown	Joseph Read	1	0.04%
Unknown	Joseph Story	1	0.04%
Unknown	Joseph Wheeler	1	0.04%
Federalists	Seth Newton	1	0.04%
Total votes		2,842	100.00%

=== Maps ===
District results

Anti-Federalist electors by district

Federalist electors by county

Anti-Federalist electors by county

== Contingent election ==
The Massachusetts General Court met on January 7, 1789, to appoint two electors to represent the state at-large and eight electors to represent districts where no candidate won a majority of the popular vote. In the district races, the legislature chose between the two candidates with the most votes in the general election. The state's election law as originally written required the legislature to choose two at-large electors who had not been candidates in the general election, but the large number of candidates led legislators to drop this requirement.

1789 contingent United States presidential election in Massachusetts
District	Party	Candidate
At-large	Federalists	Nathan Cushing
At-large	Federalists	William Shepard
Barnstable & Plymouth	Federalists	William Sever
Barnstable & Plymouth	Federalists	Samuel Savage
Berkshire & Hampshire	Federalists	Samuel Henshaw
Berkshire & Hampshire	Federalists	Elijah Dwight
Bristol, Dukes, & Nantucket	Federalists	Walter Spooner
Bristol, Dukes, & Nantucket	Federalists	Elishah May
Cumberland, Lincoln, & York (District of Maine)	Federalists	David Sewall
Cumberland, Lincoln, & York (District of Maine)	Anti-Federalists	Daniel Cony
Essex	Federalists	Samuel Phillips Jr.
Essex	Federalists	George Cabot
Middlesex	Federalists	Francis Dana
Middlesex	Federalists	John Brooks
Suffolk	Federalists	Caleb Davis
Suffolk	Fusion	Jabez Fisher
Worcester	Federalists	Moses Gill
Worcester	—N/a	Abel Wilder

== Electoral College ==
Presidential candidate	Party	Home state	Electoral vote (Note: Each elector voted for two candidates.)
George Washington	Independent	Virginia	10
John Adams	Federalists	Massachusetts	10
Total votes			10

Source: A New Nation Votes: American Election Results, 1787–1825. American Antiquarian Society.

== See also ==
- United States presidential elections in Massachusetts

== Bibliography ==
=== Primary sources ===
- Westport Historical Society (2025). Dartmouth Town Meeting Records, 1760–1796. Westport, MA.

=== Secondary sources ===
- Ben-Atar, Doron S.; Brown, Richard D. (2014). Taming Lust: Crimes Against Nature in the Early Republic. Philadelphia: University of Pennsylvania Press.
- Boonshoft, Mark (2020). Aristocratic Education and the Making of the American Republic. Chapel Hill: University of North Carolina Press.
- Boyd, Steven R. (1979). The Politics of Opposition: Antifederalists and the Acceptance of the Constitution. Millwood, NY: KTO Press.
- Center for the Study of the American Constitution (n.d.). "Alphabetical List of State Convention Delegates" (PDF). University of Wisconsin–Madison.
- Clark, Joseph S. (1838). An Historical Sketch of Sturbridge, Mass., from its Settlement to the Present Time. Brookfield, MA.
- Condon, Sean (2015). Shays's Rebellion: Authority and Distress in Post-Revolutionary America. Baltimore: Johns Hopkins University Press.
- Cornell, Saul (1999). The Other Founders: Anti-Federalism and the Dissenting Tradition in America, 1788–1828. Chapel Hill: University of North Carolina Press.
- Cunliffe, Marcus (2002). "Elections of 1789 and 1792". In Schlesinger, Arthur M. Jr.; Israel, Fred L. (eds.). History of American Presidential Elections, 1789–2001. Vol. 1. Philadelphia: Chelsea House Publishers.
- Dubin, Michael J. (2002). United States Presidential Elections, 1788-1860. Jefferson, NC: McFarland and Company.
- Emery, Edwin (1901). History of Sanford, Maine, 1661–1900. Fall River, MA.
- Finkelman, Paul (1987). "Slavery and the Constitutional Convention: Making a Covenant With Death". In Beeman, Richard R. (ed.). Beyond Confederation: Origins of the Constitution and American National Identity. Chapel Hill: University of North Carolina Press.
- Hall, Van Beck (1972). Politics without Parties: Massachusetts, 1780–1791. London: University of Pittsburg Press.
- Jensen, Merrill; Becker, Robert A., eds. (1976). The Documentary History of the First Federal Elections, 1788–1790. Vol. 1. Madison: University of Wisconsin Press.
- Kaminski, John P.; Saladino, Gaspare J., eds. (2001). The Documentary History of the Ratification of the Constitution. Vol. 7: Ratification of the Constitution by the States, Massachusetts (4). Madison: State Historical Society of Wisconsin.
- Lampi, Philip J. (n.d.). "Electoral College". A New Nation Votes. American Antiquarian Society.
- Lampi, Philip J. (2012a). "1789 President of the United States, Electoral College". A New Nation Votes. American Antiquarian Society.
- Lampi, Philip J. (2012b). "Massachusetts 1788 Electoral College, Barnstable and Plymouth District". A New Nation Votes. American Antiquarian Society.
- Lampi, Philip J. (2012c). "Massachusetts 1788 Electoral College, Berkshire and Hampshire District". A New Nation Votes. American Antiquarian Society.
- Lampi, Philip J. (2012d). "Massachusetts 1788 Electoral College, Bristol, Dukes and Nantucket District". A New Nation Votes. American Antiquarian Society.
- Lampi, Philip J. (2012e). "Massachusetts 1788 Electoral College, Cumberland, Lincoln and York District". A New Nation Votes. American Antiquarian Society.
- Lampi, Philip J. (2012f). "Massachusetts 1788 Electoral College, Essex District". A New Nation Votes. American Antiquarian Society.
- Lampi, Philip J. (2012g). "Massachusetts 1788 Electoral College, Middlesex District". A New Nation Votes. American Antiquarian Society.
- Lampi, Philip J. (2012h). "Massachusetts 1788 Electoral College, Suffolk District". A New Nation Votes. American Antiquarian Society.
- Lampi, Philip J. (2012i). "Massachusetts 1788 Electoral College, Worcester District". A New Nation Votes. American Antiquarian Society.
- Leamon, James (1993). "In Shays's Shadow: Separation and Ratification of the Constitution in Maine". In Gross, Robert A. (ed.). In Debt to Shays: The Bicentennial of an Agrarian Rebellion. Charlottesville: Colonial Society of Massachusetts.
- Norse, Henry S. (1894). History of the Town of Harvard, Massachusetts, 1732–1893. Harvard.
- Petroelje, Marvin Junion (1969). Levi Lincoln, Sr : Jeffersonian Republican of Massachusetts (PhD thesis). [East Lansing]: Michigan State University.
- Stephens, Frank Fletcher (1909). The Transitional Period, 1788–1789, in the Government of the United States. Columbia, Missouri: E. W. Stephens Publishing Company. p. 58.
- Taylor, Charles J. (1882). History of Great Barrington, (Berkshire County,) Massachusetts. Great Barrington.
