= 1787 Massachusetts Senate election =

1787 statewide election in Massachusetts, US

Elections to the Massachusetts Senate were held during 1787 to elect 40 State Senators. Candidates were elected at the county level, with some counties electing multiple Senators.

For election, a candidate needed the support of a majority of those voting. If a seat remained vacant because no candidate received such majority, the Massachusetts General Court was empowered to fill it by a majority vote of its members.

The primary issue in this race was the ongoing ratification of the United States Constitution by a separate ratifying convention; the reaction divided the state (and nation) between Federalists and Anti-Federalists, though the factions did not appear as strictly formal political parties until 1789.

The elections were also held during the midst of Shays' Rebellion, an armed uprising in Western Massachusetts against the national government, formed in opposition to the ongoing debt crisis.

== Apportionment ==
The apportionment of seats by population was as follows:

- Barnstable County: 1
- Berkshire County: 2
- Bristol County: 3
- Cumberland County: 1
- Dukes and Nantucket Counties: 1
- Essex County: 6
- Hampshire County: 4
- Lincoln County: 1
- Middlesex County: 5
- Plymouth County: 3
- Suffolk County: 6
- Worcester County: 5
- York County: 2

== Results ==
=== Barnstable ===
1787 Barnstable Senate election
Party	Candidate	Votes	%
Unknown	Thomas Smith	358	68.32%
Scattering	All others	166	31.68%
Total votes		524	100.00%

=== Berkshire ===
1787 Berkshire Senate election
Party	Candidate	Votes	%
Unknown	Thompson J. Skinner (incumbent)	659	78.45%
Unknown	Elijah Dwight	503	59.88%
Total votes		840	100.00%

Both candidates were elected.

=== Bristol ===
1787 Bristol Senate election
Party	Candidate	Votes	%
Unknown	Holder Slocum	1,507	74.49%
Unknown	Abraham White	1,504	74.35%
Unknown	Phanuel Bishop	1,111	54.92%
Total votes		2,023	100.00%

=== Cumberland ===
1787 Cumberland Senate election
Party	Candidate	Votes	%
Unknown	Josiah Thacher	286	63.56%
Scattering	All others	164	36.44%
Total votes		450	100.00%

=== Dukes and Nantucket ===
1787 Dukes and Nantucket Senate election
Party	Candidate	Votes	%
Unknown	Matthew Mayhew	155	43.78%
Unknown	Thomas Cooke	137	38.70%
Scattering	All others	62	17.51%
Total votes		354	100.00%

Because Mayhew failed to achieve a majority, the election was put to the General Court, which certified his election with near unanimity.

==== General Court ====
1787 General Court election
Party	Candidate	Votes	%
Unknown	Matthew Mayhew	178	90.82%
Total votes		196	100.00%

=== Essex ===
1787 Essex Senate election
Party	Candidate	Votes	%
Federalist	Benjamin Goodhue (incumbent)	1,493	63.83%
Unknown	Aaron Wood	1,313	56.14%
Unknown	Peter Coffin	1,241	53.06%
Unknown	Israel Hutchinson	1,124	48.05%
Federalist	Tristram Dalton (incumbent)	1,105	47.24%
Unknown	Samuel Holton	882	38.70%
Unknown	John Manning	858	37.71%
Unknown	Jonathan Greenleaf	850	36.34%
Unknown	Stephen Choate	808	34.54%
Total votes		2,339	100.00%

Dalton, Choate, and Greenleaf would subsequently be elected by the General Court.

==== General Court ====
1787 General Court election
Party	Candidate	Votes	%
Federalist	Tristram Dalton (incumbent)	207	95.83%
Unknown	Stephen Choate	121	56.02%
Unknown	Jonathan Greenleaf	121	56.02%
Total votes		216	100.00%

=== Hampshire ===
1787 Hampshire Senate election
Party	Candidate	Votes	%
Federalist	Caleb Strong (incumbent)	696	50.51%
Unknown	John Hastings	620	44.99%
Unknown	Oliver Phelps	517	37.52%
Unknown	William Shepard	477	34.62%
Unknown	David Smead	362	26.27%
Unknown	David Sexton	339	24.60%
Unknown	John Bliss	313	22.71%
Total votes		1,378	100.00%

Hastings, Smead, and Phelps were subsequently elected by the General Court.

==== General Court ====
1787 General Court election
Party	Candidate	Votes	%
Unknown	John Hastings	218	99.09%
Unknown	Oliver Phelps	158	71.82%
Unknown	David Smead	145	65.90%
Total votes		220	100.00%

=== Lincoln ===
1787 Lincoln Senate election
Party	Candidate	Votes	%
Unknown	Samuel Thompson	307	56.43%
Scattering	All others	237	43.57%
Total votes		544	100.00%

=== Middlesex ===
1787 Middlesex Senate election
Party	Candidate	Votes	%
Unknown	Joseph B. Varnum (incumbent)	2,005	75.95%
Unknown	Isaac Stearns	1,892	71.67%
Unknown	Ebenezer Bridge	1,403	53.14%
Unknown	Walter MacFarland	1,300	49.24%
Unknown	Joseph Hosmer	924	35.00%
Unknown	Marshal Spring	831	31.48%
Unknown	Eleazer Brooks	720	27.27%
Total votes		2,640	100.00%

Based on returns from Weston, Ezra Sergant, Abraham Fuller, James Prescot, Joseph Curtis, Thomas Fairweather, Joseph Roberts, John Brooks, and Abner Sanderson also received votes, but how many they received county-wide is unknown.

Hosmer and MacFarland were subsequently elected by the General Court.

==== General Court ====
1787 General Court election
Party	Candidate	Votes	%
Unknown	Joseph Hosmer	127	58.26%
Unknown	Walter MacFarland	116	53.21%
Total votes		218	100.00%

=== Plymouth ===
1787 Plymouth Senate election
Party	Candidate	Votes	%
Unknown	Nathan Mitchel	890	63.44%
Unknown	Noah Fearing	537	38.28%
Unknown	Charles Turner	401	28.58%
Unknown	Nathan Cushing	369	26.30%
Unknown	Abraham Holmes	350	24.95%
Total votes		1,403	100.00%

Turner and Cushing were subsequently elected by the General Court.

==== General Court ====
1787 General Court election
Party	Candidate	Votes	%
Unknown	Nathan Cushing	143	64.71%
Unknown	Charles Turner	118	53.39%
Total votes		221	100.00%

=== Suffolk ===
1787 Suffolk Senate election
Party	Candidate	Votes	%
Unknown	Stephen Metcalf	2,087	65.75%
Federalist	Cotton Tufts	1,976	62.26%
Anti-Federalist	Samuel Adams	1,704	53.69%
Federalist	William Phillips Jr.	1,590	50.09%
Unknown	Thomas Dawes	1,137	35.82%
Unknown	Benjamin Austin Jr.	1,056	33.27%
Anti-Federalist	James Warren	1,031	32.48%
Unknown	Elijah Dunbar	994	31.32%
Total votes		3,174	100.00%

Austin and Dunbar were subsequently elected by the General Court. (No result is listed for Dunbar's election.)

==== General Court ====
1787 General Court election
Party	Candidate	Votes	%
Unknown	Benjamin Austin Jr.	129	61.72%
Total votes		209	100.00%

=== Worcester ===
1787 Worcester Senate election
Party	Candidate	Votes	%
Unknown	Jonathan Grout (incumbent)	2,341	67.72%
Unknown	Samuel Curtis	2,290	66.24%
Unknown	Abel Wilder	1,841	53.25%
Unknown	Joseph Stone	1,635	47.30%
Anti-Federalist	Amos Singletary	1,133	32.77%
Unknown	Seth Washburn	991	28.67%
Unknown	Peter Penniman	892	25.80%
Total votes		3,457	100.00%

==== General Court ====
1787 General Court election
Party	Candidate	Votes	%
Anti-Federalist	Amos Singletary	110	52.13%
Unknown	Seth Washburn	109	51.66%
Total votes		211	100.00%

=== York ===
1787 York Senate election
Party	Candidate	Votes	%
Unknown	John Frost	271	48.13%
Unknown	Tristram Jordan	232	41.21%
Unknown	Ichabod Goodwin	149	26.47%
Unknown	Edward Cutts	110	19.54%
Total votes		563	100.00%

No candidate received a majority. Cutts and Jordan were subsequently elected by the General Court.

==== General Court ====
1787 General Court election
Party	Candidate	Votes	%
Unknown	Edward Cutts	112	52.13%
Unknown	Tristram Jordan	109	51.66%
Total votes		211	100.00%
