= Camp Clinton =

WWII POW camp in Clinton, Mississippi, US

Coordinates: 32.305348°N 90.315236°W

- Clinton, Mississippi
- Camp Clinton entrance in 1943. The sign reads "Prisoner of War Camp Clinton, Miss."

Location
- Location within Mississippi

Camp Clinton was a World War II prisoner of war facility located in Clinton, Mississippi, just off present-day McRaven Road, east of Springridge Road. Camp Clinton was home to 3,000 German and Italian POWs, most of whom had been captured in Africa and were members of the Afrika Korps.

The prisoners at Camp Clinton provided labor to build the Mississippi River Basin Model, a one-square-mile working replica model of the Mississippi River and its tributaries, which the United States Army Corps of Engineers used for planning flood control projects.

Camp Clinton also housed several dozen German generals and admirals, including 5th Panzer Army’s commander Hans-Jürgen von Arnim, Wehrmacht general Ferdinand Neuling, and Dietrich von Choltitz, the last wartime Governor of Paris, who surrendered to the Free French.
