= Samuel Dexter House =

- U.S. Historic district – Contributing property
- Location within Massachusetts Location within the United States
- Location: 699 High Street, Dedham, Massachusetts
- Coordinates: 42.2501°N 71.1779°W
- Built: 1761
- Architect: Samuel Dexter; J. Harleston Parker
- Architectural style: Federal, Georgian, Colonial Revival
- Part of: Dedham Village Historic District (ID06000785)
- Added to NRHP: September 6, 2006

The Samuel Dexter House is an historic house at 699 High Street, Dedham, Massachusetts. It was built, beginning in July 1761, by Samuel Dexter, a member of the Massachusetts Provincial Congress.

Dexter purchased the property on which the house stands on March 18, 1761. The house was next door to the parsonage of the First Church and Parish in Dedham, where he grew up. The house was the childhood home of the Secretary of the Treasury Samuel Dexter. Dexter hosted Governor Thomas Hutchinson at the house in 1771.

The building was remodeled in 1901 following the design of J. Harleston Parker, using Colonial Revival elements. The Samuel Dexter House is a contributing property to the Dedham Village Historic District, added to the National Register of Historic Places in September 2006.

== Other uses ==
The home was the site of the funeral of Faith Huntington, who had been living there, on November 28, 1775.

The house served as the headquarters of General George Washington for a night following the evacuation of Boston. Washington paid £9.18.7 for use of the home on April 4 to 5, 1776. Dexter had retired to Connecticut by this point, but his fellow Governor's Councilor Joshua Henshaw was living at the house.

The house also contained all but two books of records from the Suffolk County Registry of Deeds. They had been removed from Boston to protect them during the military occupation of the capital.

== See also ==
- List of Washington's Headquarters during the Revolutionary War
- National Register of Historic Places listings in Norfolk County, Massachusetts
- Old Village Cemetery
- Fairbanks House (Dedham, Massachusetts)

== Works cited ==
- Hanson, Robert Brand (1976). Dedham, Massachusetts, 1635-1890. Dedham Historical Society.
- Warren, Charles (1931). Jacobin and Junto: Or, Early American Politics as Viewed in the Diary of Dr. Nathaniel Ames, 1758-1822. Harvard University Press.
