= Dedham Village Historic District =

Historic district in Massachusetts, United States

- U.S. National Register of Historic Places
- U.S. Historic district
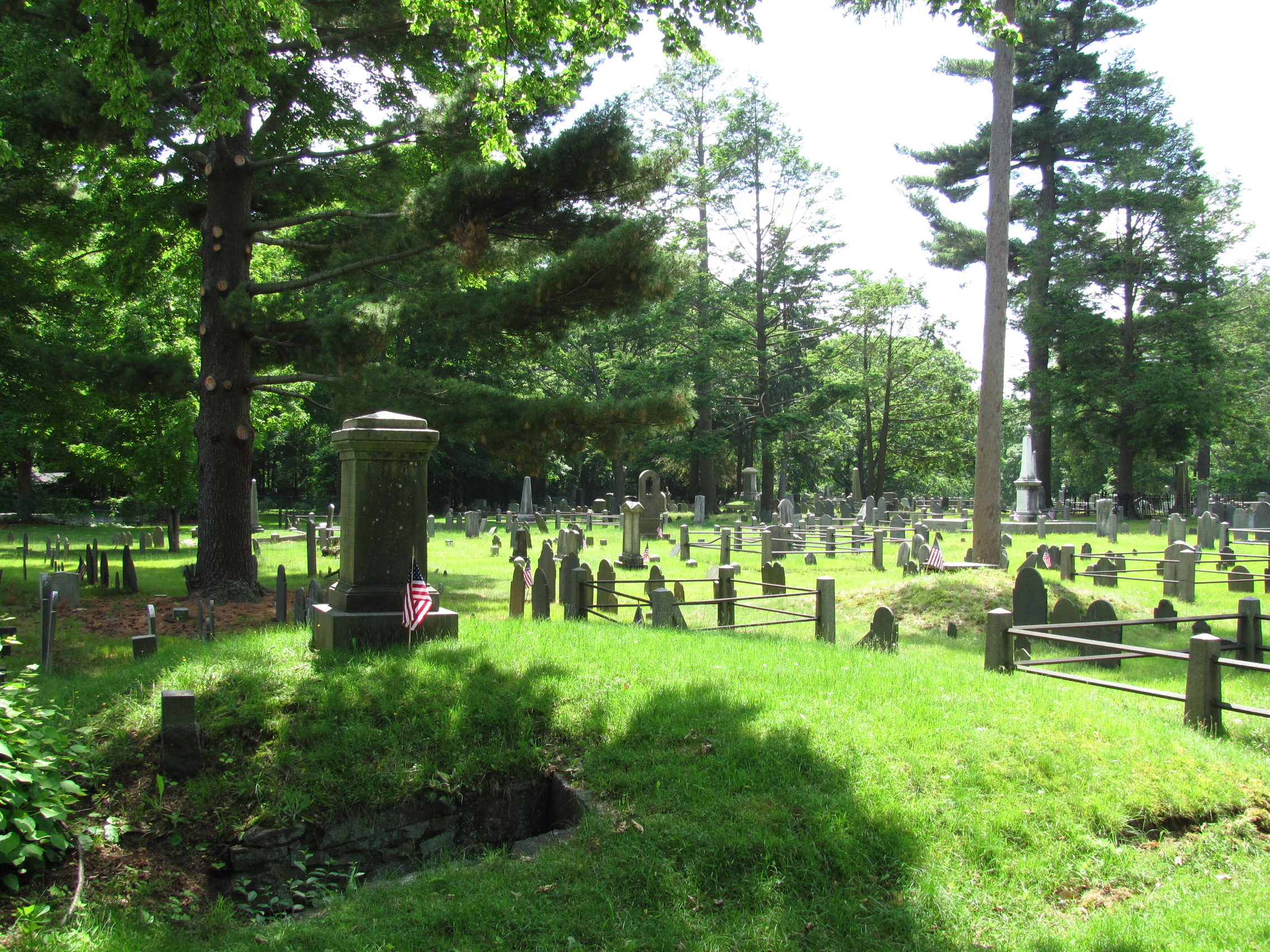
- Old Village Cemetery

- Location within Massachusetts Location within the United States
- Location: Dedham, Massachusetts
- Coordinates: 42°14′54″N 71°10′49″W
- Area: 55 acres (22 ha)
- Built: 1793
- Architect: Baker, Eliphalet; et al.
- Architectural style: Federal, Italianate
- NRHP reference No.: 06000785
- Added to NRHP: September 6, 2006

The Dedham Village Historic District is a historic district encompassing the historic center of Dedham, Massachusetts. Its principal focus is a stretch of High Street between Bridge and Ames Streets; it extends south along Bridge Street to Haven Street, as well as along Ames and Court Streets, and small streets adjacent. The area has been associated with the growth and development of Dedham since the community was established in 1636. Its most notable structure is the Norfolk County Courthouse, a National Historic Landmark. It also includes the Old Village Cemetery. The district was listed on the National Register of Historic Places in 2006. It is roughly bounded by Village Avenue and High, Court, Washington, School, and Chestnut Streets.

== See also ==
- Fairbanks House (Dedham, Massachusetts)
- Samuel Dexter House
- Daniel Slattery house
- National Register of Historic Places listings in Norfolk County, Massachusetts
