= Feliciana, Kentucky =

Unincorporated community in Kentucky, United States

- Unincorporated community
- Location within Kentucky Location within the United States
- Coordinates: 36°32′59″N 88°47′29″W
- Country: United States
- State: Kentucky
- County: Graves
- Elevation: 449 ft (137 m)
- Time zone: UTC-6 (Central (CST))
  - Summer (DST): UTC-5 (CDT)
- GNIS feature ID: 507986

Feliciana is an unincorporated community in Graves County, Kentucky, on Kentucky Route 94.

Settled in the early 1820s, Feliciana is served by a post office established in 1829.

== Notable people ==
- Lou Singletary Bedford (1837–?), author, poet, editor
