= Sarah Ann Dickey =

American educator

Sarah A. Dickey
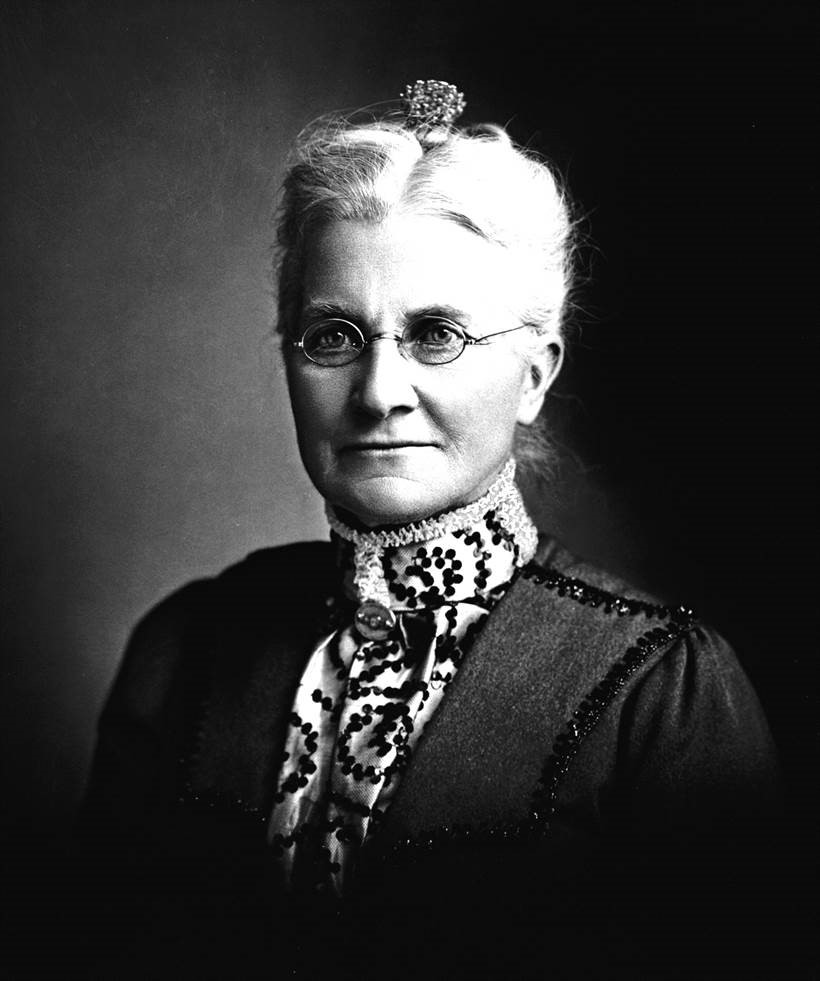
- Born: Sarah A. Dickey; April 25, 1838; Ohio, U.S.
- Died: January 23, 1904 (aged 65); Clinton, Mississippi, U.S.
- Education: Mount Holyoke College
- Occupation: Educator
- Writing career
- Language: English

Sarah Ann Dickey (April 25, 1838 – January 23, 1904) was an American educator from Ohio who in 1875 founded Mount Hermon Female Seminary, a historically black institution of higher education for women in Clinton, Mississippi. She returned to the north to get a degree at Mount Holyoke College in Massachusetts. Afterward, she went back to Mississippi to work on education for African Americans. She became an ordained minister in 1896 in the United Brethren Church.

The women's college closed in the 1920s. Sumner Hill Junior High School developed at this site.

== Background ==
Dickey was born in 1838 near Dayton, Ohio. Although her formal education did not begin until she was sixteen, she received a teacher's certificate three years later.

During the American Civil War, the Evangelical United Brethren Church sent her to Vicksburg, Mississippi, to teach freedmen and their children from 1863 to 1865. In 1866, she enrolled in Mount Holyoke Female Seminary (now Mount Holyoke College), graduating in 1869.

== Career ==
After graduating, Dickey returned to Mississippi to continue working with African Americans recently freed from slavery, teaching for the American Missionary Association from 1869 to 1870 and then the new public schools of Clinton, Mississippi until 1874. She organized and established the Mount Hermon Female Seminary, which opened in October 1875 in Clinton, Mississippi. The Seminary was modeled after her alma mater, Mount Holyoke, offering education for women, and preparing them for roles primarily as teachers.

In 1896 Dickey was ordained a minister in her church, the United Brethren Church. She never married but raised several children left in her care. She remained at Mount Hernon Seminary until her death in 1904.

The Seminary was merged with Tougaloo College in 1924 by the American Missionary Association, which maintained the school after Dickey's death. The site of the seminary in Clinton is now Sumner Hill Junior High. An historical marker honoring Dickey was placed there on 29 April 2016.

== Bibliography ==
Griffith, Helen (1965). Dauntless in Mississippi: The Life of Sarah A. Dickey. South Hadley, Massachusetts: Dinosaur Press.
