= Mount Hermon Female Seminary =

Coordinates: 32.320201°N 90.362026°W

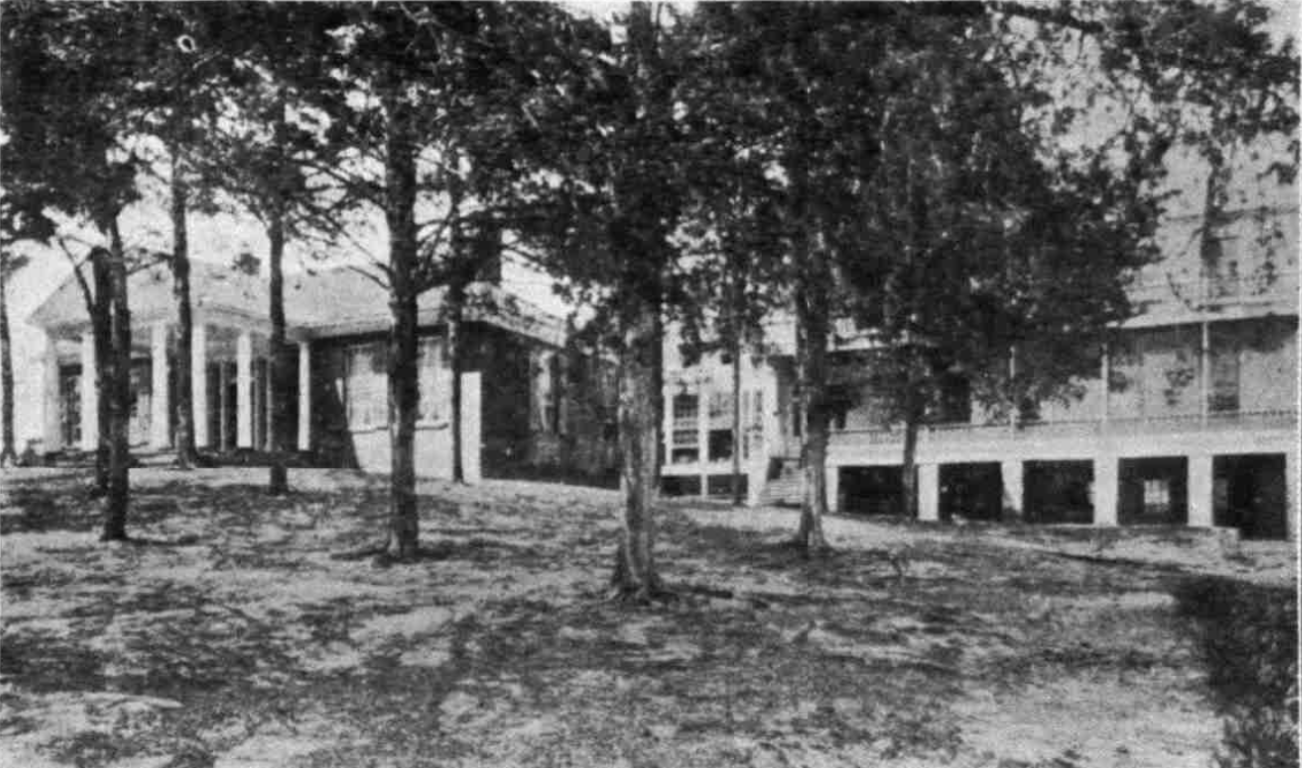
- Mount Hermon Female Seminary (c. 1910)
- Former name: Mount Hermon Seminary
- Type: Private, women's seminary, HBCU
- Active: 1875–1924
- Affiliations: American Missionary Association
- Location: Clinton, Mississippi, United States

Mount Hermon Female Seminary (1875—1924) in Clinton, Mississippi was a historically black institution of higher education for women.

== History ==
Founded in 1875 by Sarah Ann Dickey, the school was patterned after Dickey's alma mater, Mount Holyoke Female Seminary (now Mount Holyoke College). The school was funded in part by the Slater Fund for the Education of Freedman from its founding until 1891.

After Sarah Ann Dickey's death in 1903, the school was passed on to the American Missionary Association. By 1908, the Mount Hermon Female Seminary had 110 students and 6 teachers. The seminary was eventually closed in 1924 by the American Missionary Association, which had its own college in Tougaloo, Mississippi.

== Notable people ==
- Lou Singletary Bedford (1837–?), author, poet, editor

== See also ==
- Female seminary
- Women's education in the United States
