= Helen Griffith =

American professor

Helen Griffith (January 24, 1882 – October 16, 1976) was a professor at Mount Holyoke College, a teacher at colleges for African Americans in the American South, and an author.

Griffith graduated from Bryn Mawr College with a Bachelor of Arts in 1905. During her graduate studies, she attended Columbia University, the University of Chicago, and the University of Michigan, and she studied in Cambridge, England. She graduated with a master's degree from Columbia University and a doctorate from the University of Michigan.

She taught at Mount Holyoke College for 35 years, becoming the professor emeritus of English language and literature by her retirement in 1947. During her time at Mount Holyoke College, she was chairman of the committee on refugee students.

In 1949, she taught English at Tougaloo College.

She wrote a book about Sarah A. Dickey.

== Written work ==
- Griffith, Helen (1966). Dauntless in Mississippi : the life of Sarah A. Dickey, 1838-1904 (2nd ed.). South Hadley, Mass: Dinosaur Press.
