= Lou Singletary Bedford =

American author and editor

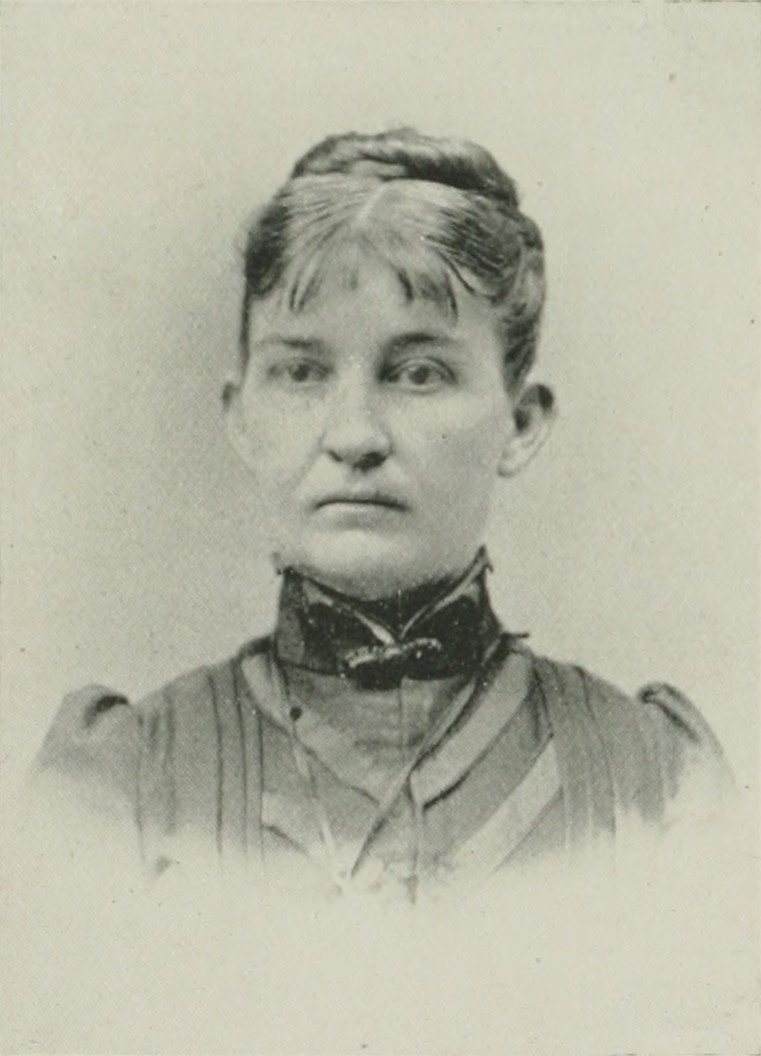
- Photo in A Woman of the Century
- Born: Lou Singletary; April 7, 1837; Feliciana, Kentucky
- Died: April 10, 1920; Little Rock, Arkansas
- Education: Clinton Seminary
- Occupations: Author; poet; editor
- Spouse: John Joseph Bedford (m. 1857)
- Children: May Bedford-Eagan
- Relatives: Amos Singletary (great-grandfather)
- Writing career
- Pen name: Lenora

Lou Singletary Bedford (April 7, 1837 – April 10, 1920), pen name Lenora, was an American author and editor. Her poems were published when she was sixteen using a pen name until she married. Later she wrote songs. Bedford contributed periodicals published to many southern States. In El Paso, she filled the position of social and literary editor of the El Paso Sunday Morning Tribune.

== Early life and education ==
Lou Singletary was born in Feliciana, Kentucky, on April 7, 1837. She came of a distinguished family. Her father, Luther Singletary, was of English descent and a native of Massachusetts, born in 1796. He was educated in Boston. Her mother, Elizabeth Hamilton Stell, was born in 1802, in Dinwiddie County, Virginia. Bedford was the fifth child and third daughter. Her great-grandfather was Amos Singletary.

Bedford's father was a teacher, and she attended his school starting at six years of age. She had no special love for books, except for reading, spelling and grammar, but her ambition kept her at the head of most of her classes. Nearly all of her education was received under her father's instruction in a country school, though she completed her course of study in Clinton Seminary. She wrote "My Childhood's Home" at age 15, and it appears in her first collection of poems.

== Career ==
Adopting the pen name of "Lenora" she contributed to periodicals and based on this success, she wrote more ambitiously.

In 1857, she married a friend, John Joseph Bedford, who was a descendant of Gunning Bedford Jr. who signed the Constitution of the United States. There were six children, of the three living sons, two married. The other moved to El Paso, and helped educate their youngest daughter.

In the financial panic of 1857, their fortunes were so much impaired that she stopped writing till end of the Civil War. In 1878, she accompanied her husband to Florida, where he went for his health. There she began her literary work while living at Bay Cottage, Milton, Florida. Her husband was editor and proprietor of The Milton Standard, and she had charge of the literary department. She eventually wrote over her own name.

In 1881, she completed A Vision and Other Poems. It was published by Robert Clark & Company, (Cincinnati) and a London publisher. This volume received recognition. Paul H. Hayne spoke warmly in its favor. Oliver Wendell Holmes, writing to Mrs. Bedford, after a review of the poems, says: "I recognize in your poems a sincere human feeling—a character which always commends any poetical effort." Longfellow, amid the praise of the world found time to write a letter of encouragement and well wishes, and a host of others, able critics and authors, were not insensible to the merits of the work.

The Louisville Courier-Journal, to which Bedford was at one time a frequent contributor, speaking of this work, said:— "Mrs. Lou S. Bedford is compared by many to Felicia Hemans; and permit me to suggest that her name be inscribed as high upon the scroll of honor and worth as that of Paul H. Hayne. There is the sweet charm of dignity, decorum and morality; yea, even more, of Christianity, breathing from her lines. There are beauty and variety, as she paints from some image before her mental eye; and truth, as she blends some internal passion of noble thought with the most beautiful imagery and choicest language. Like Mrs. Hemans, a tone of unforced, persuasive goodness, pervades her poetry; and though often sad, it is never complaining. That she is a great-hearted, womanly woman, to whose ear the words, home, husband, children and friends, are terms of sweetest import, no one can doubt who is fortunate enough to possess a copy of her elegant poems, called A Vision and Other Poems. The Vision is a tribute to the North for her magnanimity and beautiful charity to the South in 1878, when the yellow fever had desolated and depopulated so many cities and homes. The outpourings of a mighty sympathy dictated this poem; while the fragrant incense of a nation's gratitude breathes and burns through the inspiration of this woman's pen. And well may we be proud of and rejoice in her success; for, although classed among the Southern poets, 'this star-eyed, night-haired' queen of Southern song is a native of our own grand old Kentucky; and only a few years ago, sought a home beneath sunnier skies."

Gathered Leaves (Dallas), another volume, appeared in 1888. When her Gathered Leaves appeared, many notices commending the poetic merit of the book appeared in various periodicals, speaking always of her as "our gifted Texas Poetess." Deservedly popular, it won for her sincere admirers wherever it was read.

In 1893, she published Driftwood and Driftings. In its preface, she stated:— "It is said that prefaces are out of date; nevertheless, I am sufficiently old-fashioned to believe that a word of explanation is often necessary to bring the reader and writer into sympathy with each other. Heretofore, I have confined my publications to poetry; but in this miscellaneous collection I have interspersed prose with recently written poems, together with others not embraced in the former volumes. I have also gathered together the short stories and other literary remains of my daughter, Mrs. May Bedford-Eagan, and included them in this work. Had not death intervened, she intended publishing these under the title here used—Driftings. In that event, mine would have been called Miscellaneous Pencilings—a title under which I have contributed much to the press. I have chosen Driftwood and Driftings as being a more euphoneous combination than the other names would have been. Doubtless her work would have been more finished had she lived to revise it; but to me it is sacred as it is—I have made few changes.

In 1909, Bedford published a poetical romance called Forrest Dayre.

== Personal life ==
From Florida, the couple moved to Dallas, Texas. For a time, she lived in New York City, but she claimed Dallas as her home and wished to be identified with Texas. She died in Little Rock, Arkansas.
