= Hillman College =

Women's college in Mississippi, US (1853–1942)

Hillman College was a women's college in Clinton, Mississippi, that existed from 1853 until 1942. It was originally named the Central Female Institute, and renamed Hillman College in 1891. It was organized by the Central Baptist Association, and remained in operation throughout the American Civil War. Mississippi College purchased and absorbed Hillman in 1942.

Charles Hillman Brough, the governor of Arkansas from 1917 to 1921, was a faculty member at Hillman College early in his career.
