= Mississippi River Basin Model =

Scale model of the Mississippi River basin in Mississippi, United States

Coordinates: 32°18′22″N 90°18′57″W

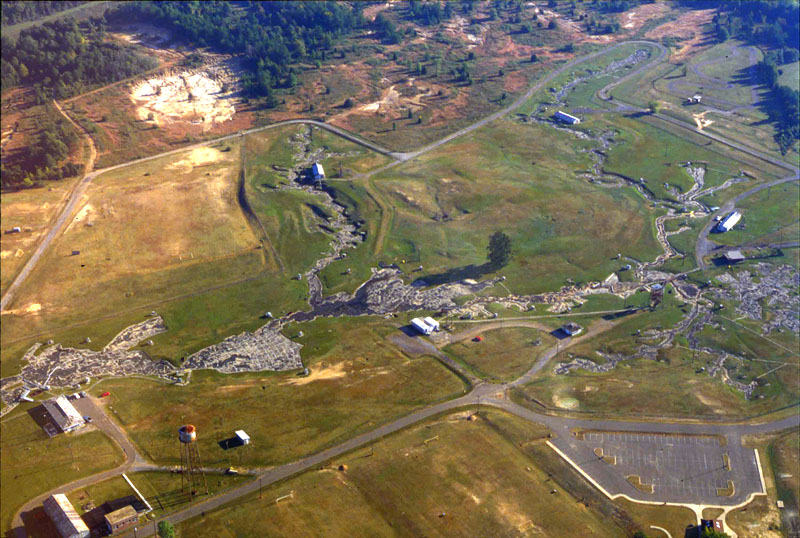
An aerial view of the model

The Mississippi River Basin Model was a large-scale hydraulic model of the entire Mississippi River basin, covering an area of 200 acres. It is part of the Waterways Experiment Station, located near Clinton, Mississippi. The model was built from 1943 to 1966 and in operation from 1949 until 1973. By comparison, the better known San Francisco Bay Model covers 1.5 acres and the Chesapeake Bay Model covers 8 acres. The model is now derelict, but open to the public within Buddy Butts Park, Jackson.

== Background ==
Large scale, localised flood control measures such as levees had been constructed since the early 1900s, especially in the decade after the Great Mississippi Flood of 1927 and following the Flood Control Act 1936. From 1928 onwards, the Army Corps of Engineers built a huge number of locks, run-off channels and extended and raised existing levees. These control measures only targeted single sites, and did not look at the entire river system.

There had already been extensive modelling of individual sections of the river at the Waterways Experiment Station in Vicksburg, including a 1060 ft long model of the 600 river miles from Helena, Arkansas to Donaldsonville, Louisiana, but in early 1937 it was clear that impact of control measures were not completely successful.

In 1941 Eugene Reybold proposed a large-scale hydraulic model which would allow the engineers to simulate weather, floods and evaluate the effect of flood control measures on the entire system. This would cover approximately 200 acres, include all existing and proposed control measures, and a network of streams nearly 8 miles in total length.

== Design ==
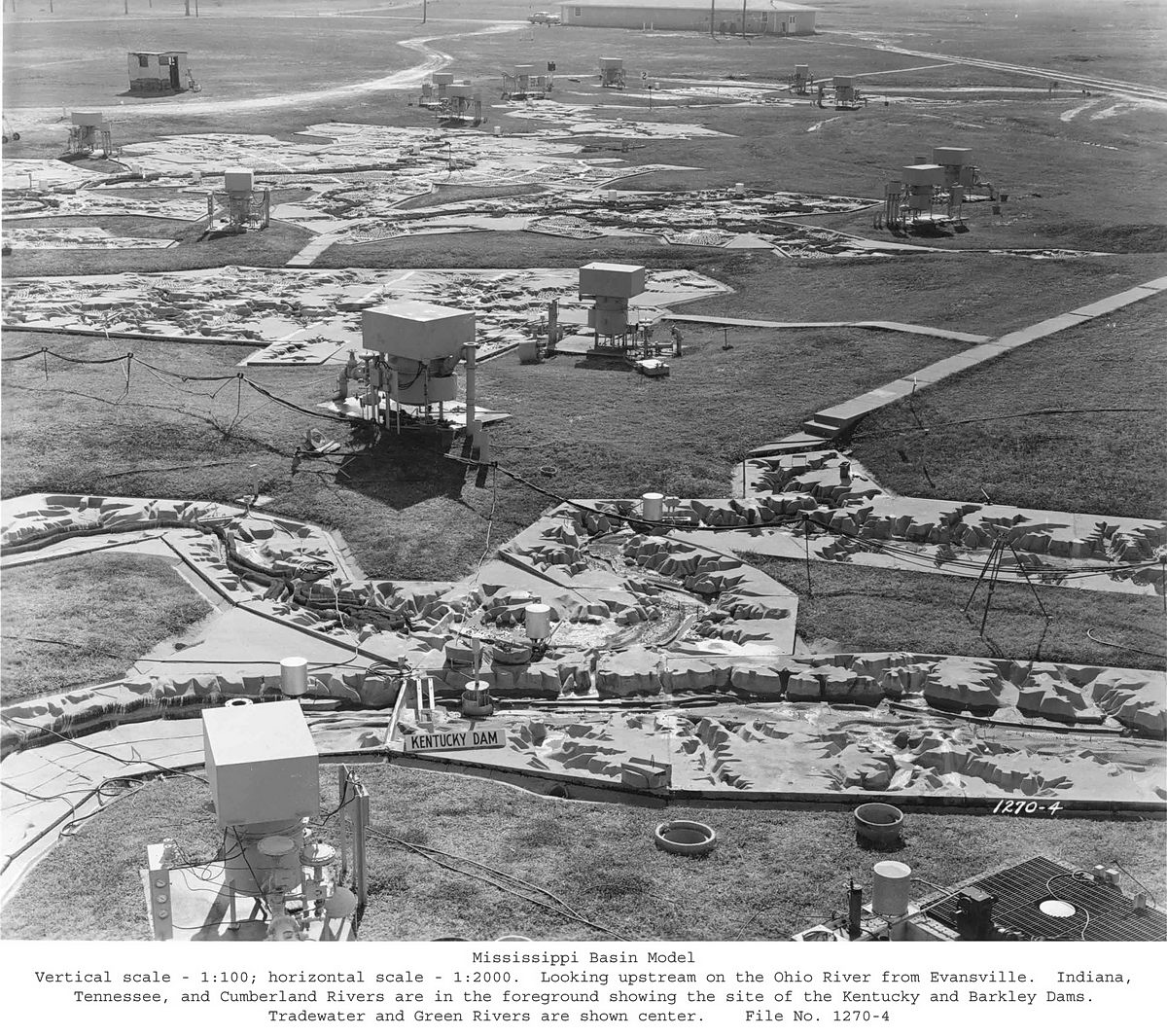
Part of the model

The scale of the model was 1:100 vertical and 1:2000 horizontal. At this scale, the Appalachian Mountains are raised 20 ft above the Gulf of Mexico, the Rocky Mountains by 50 ft. The larger vertical scale was thought to reduce surface-tension and therefore better simulate turbulence. The model used individually cast 10 ft x 10 ft (approximate) concrete panels, contoured with the land shape and river bed, including tributaries, cliffs, lakes, flood plains, bridges, and levees. Metal plugs or divots in the river bed provided roughness to simulate different types of material, whilst folded metal mesh simulated dense foliage. With each gallon of water representing 1.5 million gallons, an entire day of river flow along the whole system could be simulated in 5 minutes.

== Construction ==
As wartime labour was short, it was proposed to make use of Italian and German prisoners of war. Construction at the site was begun in January 1943, commencing with housing for the WES personnel needed to direct work on the model, as well as an internment camp for 3,000 men at nearby Camp Clinton. The first POWs (200 of Rommel's Afrika Korps) arrived in August 1943, and by December, there were almost 1800. Enlisted men received 90 cents for 8 hours labor. Officers and non-commissioned officers were not required to work, but could volunteer. By May 1946, the last of the prisoners had been repatriated, and the site was almost ready for model construction.

Individual sections were in operation from 1949, but construction was not completed until 1966, partly due to the complexity of modelling such a vast area, but also due to irregular funding.

== Operation ==
By 1952 the Missouri River segment was fully operational and used extensively to predict problems during that year's April floods, helping to avoid damage of an estimated $65 million. By 1959 the model was complete as far as Memphis and a comprehensive testing program was begun which coordinated the entire model.

In 1964, the site was opened to visitors for self-guided tours, and facilities included an assembly center, 40 ft observation tower, operation observation room, and elevated platforms, drawing about 5,000 visitors a year.

On completion in 1966, basin-wide tests examined the effectiveness of reservoirs and looked at maximizing flood protection. For the next three years, the historic floods of 1937, 1943, 1945 and 1952 were reproduced, as well as hypothetical floods at different periods of the year.

Tests on individual problems were conducted until 1971 but high costs and growth of computer modelling meant that the facility was put on standby. The last use was in 1973, when a potentially catastrophic failure arose at the Old River Control Structure. The model was used to show that the untested Morganza Spillway could be opened effectively, without diverting polluted water through New Orleans and Baton Rouge, as well as identifying levees that required topping up.

== Current status ==
In 1993 the site was taken over by the City of Jackson, designated as a Mississippi Landmark and a city park was formed around the site. The cost of maintaining the site as a tourist attraction was too high, so the model was abandoned and became overgrown. In 2000, the model was included in the Mississippi Heritage Trusts' 10 Most Endangered List, featured in a Google Sightseeing post in 2007 , and thereafter was visited and blogged about by several urban explorers and photographers. In 2010, it was reported that the panels were still intact, and observation platforms and walkways still in place.

In 2011 students from Louisiana State University received an Honor Award from the American Society of Landscape Architects for their project to revitalise the park and relaunch the model as a tourist attraction.

Richard Coupe of the Jackson Free Press visited the site in 2013 and reported it as overgrown, but open to the public within Buddy Butts Park.

A team from 16 WAPT News surveyed the site using the Eagle Eye 16 drone and reported it as overgrown, defaced, and with several pieces of the grid collapsing.

Access is via the park entrance on McRaven Road, the model is next to the soccer fields.

Friends of the Mississippi River Basin Model is a group consisting of local volunteers who have started clearing out the model with the hope of opening it to the public. The Libertarian Party of Hinds County also assists with this project.

The model was designated as a National Historic Civil Engineering Landmark by the American Society of Civil Engineers in 2018.
