= Clinton, Mississippi =

- City
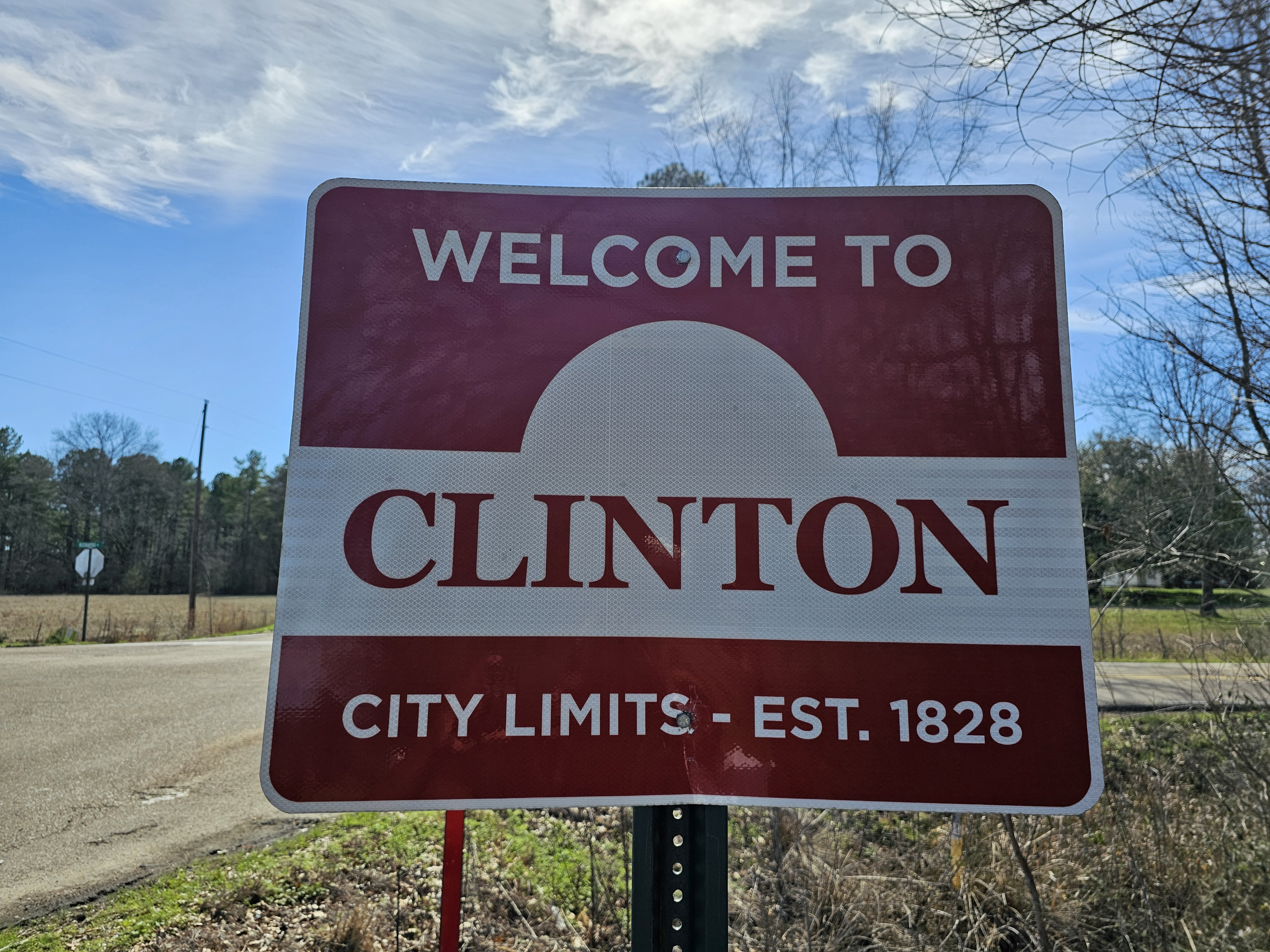
- City Limits Sign in Clinton

- Flag
- Nickname: Mount Salus (original name)
- Motto: You Belong Here
- Location in Hinds County, Mississippi

- Location of Mississippi in the United States
- Coordinates: 32°21′30″N 90°21′20″W
- Country: United States
- State: Mississippi
- County: Hinds
- Founded: 1823
- Incorporation: 1824

Government
  - Type: Mayor-council government
  - Mayor: Will Purdie (R)

Area
  - Total: 42.14 sq mi (109.15 km^{2})
  - Land: 41.87 sq mi (108.44 km^{2})
  - Water: 0.27 sq mi (0.71 km^{2})
- Elevation: 335 ft (102 m)

Population (2020)
  - Total: 28,100
  - Density: 671.1/sq mi (259.13/km^{2})
- Time zone: UTC-6 (CST)
  - Summer (DST): UTC-5 (CDT)
- ZIP codes: 39056, 39058, 39060 (P.O. boxes)
- Area codes: 601 and 769
- FIPS code: 28-14420
- GNIS feature ID: 2404080
- Website: www.clintonms.org

Clinton is a city in Hinds County, Mississippi, United States. Situated in the Jackson metropolitan area, it is the 10th most populous city in Mississippi. The population was 28,100 at the 2020 United States census.

== History ==
Camp Clinton entrance in 1943. The sign reads "Prisoner of War Camp Clinton, Miss."

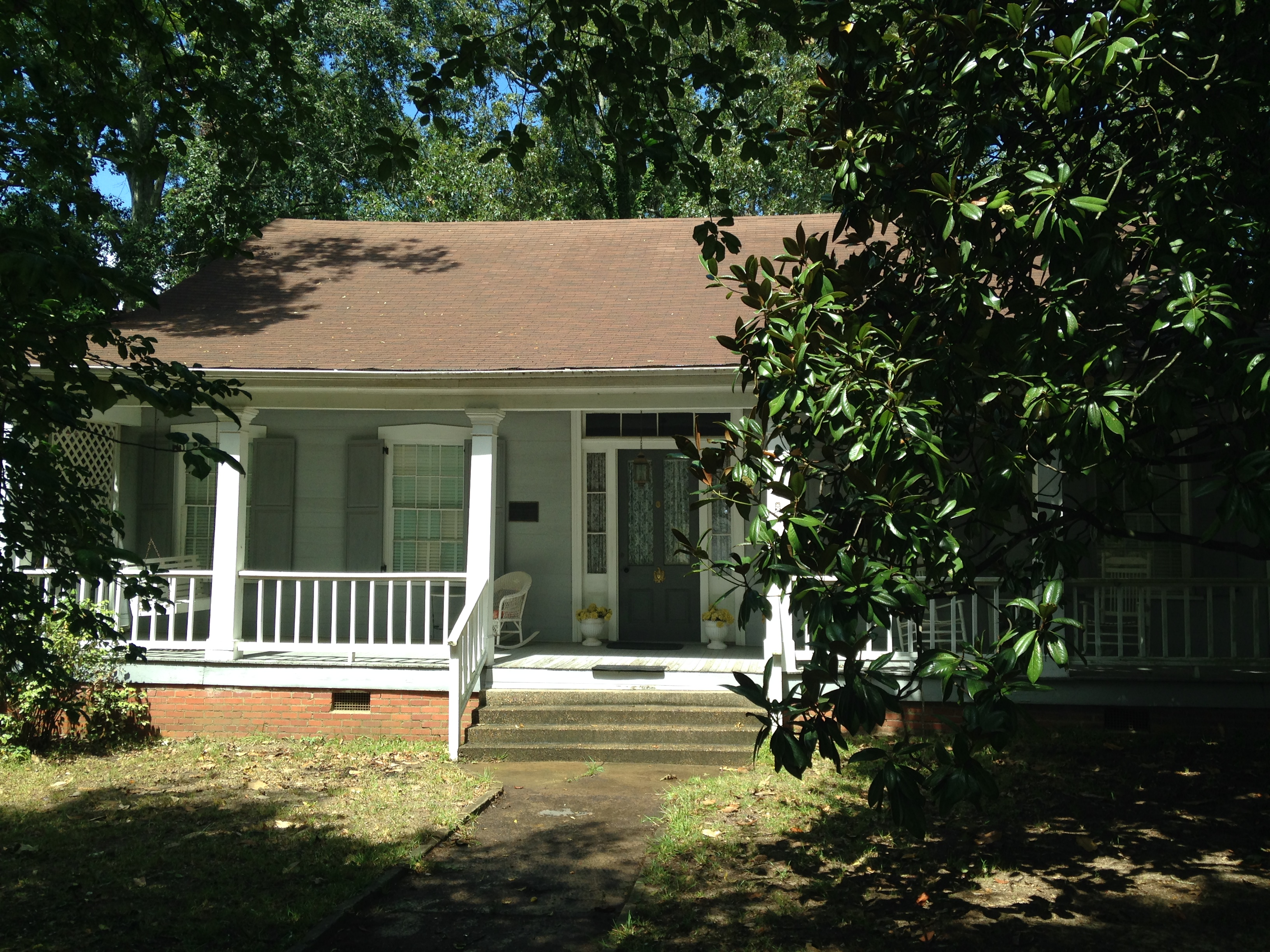
The Cedars in Clinton is listed on the National Register of Historic Places

Founded in 1823, Clinton was originally known as Mt. Salus, which means "Mountain of health". It was named for the plantation home of Walter Leake, third governor of Mississippi, which was located in Clinton and built in 1812. The road east from Vicksburg was completed to Mount Salus and the federal government located the United States General Land Office at Mount Salus in 1822. The original federal survey in 1822 references a spring called "Swafford's Spring" at the site of the town. In 1828, the city changed its name to Clinton in honor of DeWitt Clinton, the former governor of New York who led completion of the Erie Canal.

The first road through Mount Salus/Clinton was the Natchez Trace, improved from a centuries-old Native American path. Currently Clinton has three major highways that pass through the city: the Natchez Trace Parkway, U.S. Route 80, and Interstate 20.

Mississippi Christian University (known as Mississippi College until 2026), a Christian university located in Clinton, is the oldest college in the state of Mississippi. It was founded on January 24, 1826, as Hampstead Academy, the second male college in the state after Jefferson College. Mississippi College is the second oldest Baptist university in the world, and was the first coeducational college in the United States to grant a degree to a woman. Clinton is home to sports teams known as the "Clinton Arrows" and "Mississippi College Choctaws". Hillman College, originally for women, was founded in 1853 as Central Female Institute, supported by the Central Baptist Association. It changed its name in 1891. Mount Hermon Female Seminary, a historically black college, was established in 1875 by Sarah Ann Dickey. It closed in 1924 as students moved to co-educational institutions.

The Clinton-Vicksburg Railroad was the second oldest in the state, incorporated in 1831. It contributed to the export of 20,000 bales of cotton annually from this city, the most of any city between Vicksburg and Meridian. Cotton from three surrounding counties was shipped through Clinton and by rail to Grand Gulf on the Mississippi.

During the Civil War, Confederate forces, as well as Union troops— the latter commanded by generals Ulysses S. Grant and Sherman—briefly occupied Clinton on their way to the Battle of Vicksburg in May 1863. Grant had mistakenly believed that John C. Pemberton, a Confederate general, would attack him at Clinton. Grant finally took Vicksburg in this campaign.

=== Clinton Massacre ===
In September 1875 during the election campaign, a Republican political rally was held in downtown Clinton, where 3,000 people were gathered expecting Governor Adelbert Ames and other prominent speakers. White insurgents disrupted the rally, attacking blacks with guns. It resulted in the deaths of several white men and an estimated 50 blacks later that night and over the next few days. Despite the organized nature of the attack, it is sometimes referred to as the "Clinton Riot". More armed whites arrived by train and attacked blacks. Among the black victims were schoolteachers, church leaders, and local Republican organizers.

Whites had been attacking black and white Republicans in every election cycle, and that year the paramilitary Red Shirts arose in the state as a force to intimidate blacks and suppress black voting. The governor appealed to the federal government for protection and the U.S. government sent more troops. But election-related violence continued through the fall and, together with fraud at the polls, resulted in white Democrats regaining control of the state legislature and, in 1876, the governor's seat. This political shift signaled the end of the Reconstruction era, confirmed when the federal government withdrew remaining troops in 1877.

=== 20th century to present ===
During World War II, Camp Clinton was established as a German POW camp south of town; it housed about 3,000 German soldiers. Most of the prisoners were from the Afrika Korps. Of the 40 German generals captured in the war, Camp Clinton housed 35 of them. The German soldiers provided the labor to build a replica model of the Mississippi River Basin for the U.S. Army Corps of Engineers, used for planning and designing flood prevention.

Clinton, the smallest city to ever host a Fortune 500 company, was the headquarters for WorldCom from the mid-1990s until 2002. WorldCom went bankrupt due to what was at the time the largest accounting scandal in U.S. history. The financial dealings resulted in fraud-related convictions of Bernard Ebbers, CEO, and Scott Sullivan, CFO. The company changed its name to MCI and moved its corporate headquarters location to Ashburn, Virginia. Verizon, MCI's successor, owns SkyTel (no relation to Bell Mobility's Skytel brand). It still occupies the massive former WorldCom compound in Clinton.

On April 15, 2011, an EF3 tornado struck the city at about 11:00 am. CDT. It produced damage near Interstate 20, which included total destruction to the BankPlus building. Malaco Records was destroyed as well. Ten people were injured by the tornado.

== Geography ==
According to the 2010 United States census, the city has a total area of 42.147 square miles (109.16 km^{2}), of which 41.822 square miles (108.32 km^{2}) is land and 0.325 square miles (0.84 km^{2}) is water. Three major roads run through the city of Clinton. Interstate 20 has 3 exits within the Clinton area. 3 partial cloverleaf interchanges with Springridge Road, Clinton-Raymond Road, and Natchez Trace Parkway. U.S. Route 80 is another main highway that runs through Clinton tracing Interstate 20 along with it. Natchez Trace Parkway is also a main road that runs through the west side of the city crossing Interstate 20 as Interstate 20's 3rd exit within the city limits.

== Demographics ==
Historical population
Census	Pop.	Note	%±
1880	569		—
1900	354		—
1910	767		116.7%
1920	669		−12.8%
1930	912		36.3%
1940	916		0.4%
1950	2,255		146.2%
1960	3,438		52.5%
1970	7,289		112.0%
1980	14,660		101.1%
1990	21,847		49.0%
2000	23,347		6.9%
2010	25,216		8.0%
2020	28,100		11.4%
U.S. Decennial Census

=== 2020 census ===
As of the 2020 census, Clinton had a population of 28,100. The median age was 36.0 years. 22.6% of residents were under the age of 18 and 16.9% of residents were 65 years of age or older. For every 100 females there were 85.7 males, and for every 100 females age 18 and over there were 81.5 males age 18 and over.

83.2% of residents lived in urban areas, while 16.8% lived in rural areas.

There were 10,522 households in Clinton, and the census reported 6,187 families; 33.2% had children under the age of 18 living in them. Of all households, 45.1% were married-couple households, 17.1% were households with a male householder and no spouse or partner present, and 34.3% were households with a female householder and no spouse or partner present. About 30.0% of all households were made up of individuals and 12.2% had someone living alone who was 65 years of age or older.

There were 11,207 housing units, of which 6.1% were vacant. The homeowner vacancy rate was 1.4% and the rental vacancy rate was 8.4%.

Racial composition as of the 2020 census
Race	Number	Percent
White	14,516	51.7%
Black or African American	10,754	38.3%
American Indian and Alaska Native	55	0.2%
Asian	1,294	4.6%
Native Hawaiian and Other Pacific Islander	9	0.0%
Some other race	439	1.6%
Two or more races	1,033	3.7%
Hispanic or Latino (of any race)	785	2.8%

== Government ==
Clinton operates as a code charter form of government, divided into six Wards. The local governing body consists of the mayor, one Alderman representing each of the six Wards and one Alderman-at-Large whose duty is to represent the entire community.

As of July 1, 2025, Will Purdie is the city's mayor.

== Economy ==
At one point WorldCom (now Verizon) was headquartered in Clinton. In 2003 the company announced that it would move its headquarters to Virginia.

Automotive component manufacturer Delphi Corporation operated a plant in Clinton from the early 1970s until its closure in 2009, making cable and wiring connectors. When Delphi closed the plant in late 2009, with the loss of 280 jobs, production moved to Delphi's Warren, Ohio facility.

== Education ==
=== Universities and colleges ===
- Mississippi College founded 1826, incorporating Hillman College 1853–1942
- The local community college is Hinds Community College.

=== Primary and secondary schools ===
The city of Clinton's public schools are served by the Clinton Public School District, including Clinton Park (Grades Pre-K - 1), Northside (Grades 2nd - 3rd), Eastside (Grades 4 - 5), Lovett (Grade 6), Clinton Jr High (Grades 7 - 8), Sumner Hill (Grade 9) and Clinton High School (Grades 10 through 12)

=== Public library ===
Jackson/Hinds Library System operates the Quisenberry Library in Clinton. In 2018 the Clinton city government, citing problems with the sanitary condition, closed the library. It stated that it would reopen if the library system revised the terms of the library lease.

The library later reopened. However, in 2020, due to the COVID-19 pandemic, it closed again for over two months. It reopened once more to the public on June 5, 2020, with public health and safety precautions in effect.

== Sports ==
The Mississippi Brilla is a soccer team competing in USL League Two (PDL), the fourth highest league of the American Soccer Pyramid, and playing in the Mid-South Division of the Southern Conference. They play their home games at Traceway Park in the city of Clinton.

== Notable people ==
- Cam Akers – Professional football player
- Mandy Ashford – singer, model, and member of Innosense.
- Lance Bass – pop singer, actor and producer; member of the pop group *NSYNC
- William Joel Blass – jurist, legislator, and lawyer
- Charles Hillman Brough – governor of Arkansas from 1917 to 1921, was born in Clinton
- Jon Brown – NFL kicker
- Keith Carlock, jazz drummer and Mississippi Musicians Hall of Fame inductee
- Cynthia F. Cooper – auditor, whistleblower
- Ted DiBiase, Sr. – professional wrestler, minister
- Ted DiBiase, Jr. – professional wrestler
- Dominic Douglas – professional football player
- Bernard Ebbers – Canadian businessman and the co-founder and CEO of WorldCom.
- Jenna Edwards – model, former Miss Teen All-American, former Miss Florida
- Meredith Edwards – country music singer
- Shelly Fairchild – country music singer
- Taryn Foshee – 2006 Miss Mississippi
- Edgar Godbold – Mississippi College biology professor from 1906 to 1912
- James E. Graves, Jr. – United States Court of Appeals for the Fifth Circuit judge
- Phillip Gunn – former Speaker of the Mississippi House of Representatives
- Barry Hannah – writer, professor
- Beth Holloway – author and mother of Natalee Holloway
- Natalee Holloway – unsolved disappearance
- Jaret Holmes – former placekicker (various teams)
- Niesa Johnson – two time All-American, Professional Basketball Player
- Daniel Curtis Lee – actor
- Rory Lee – former vice president and interim president of Mississippi College
- Robert S. McElvaine – writer, professor
- Crystal Renn, plus-size model
- Scott Savage – former drummer of Grammy and Dove award-winning band Jars of Clay
- Leon Seals – former Buffalo Bills and Philadelphia Eagles defensive tackle
- Jerod Ward – Former professional basketball player
