= Joshua Henshaw =

American merchant, politician (1746–1823)

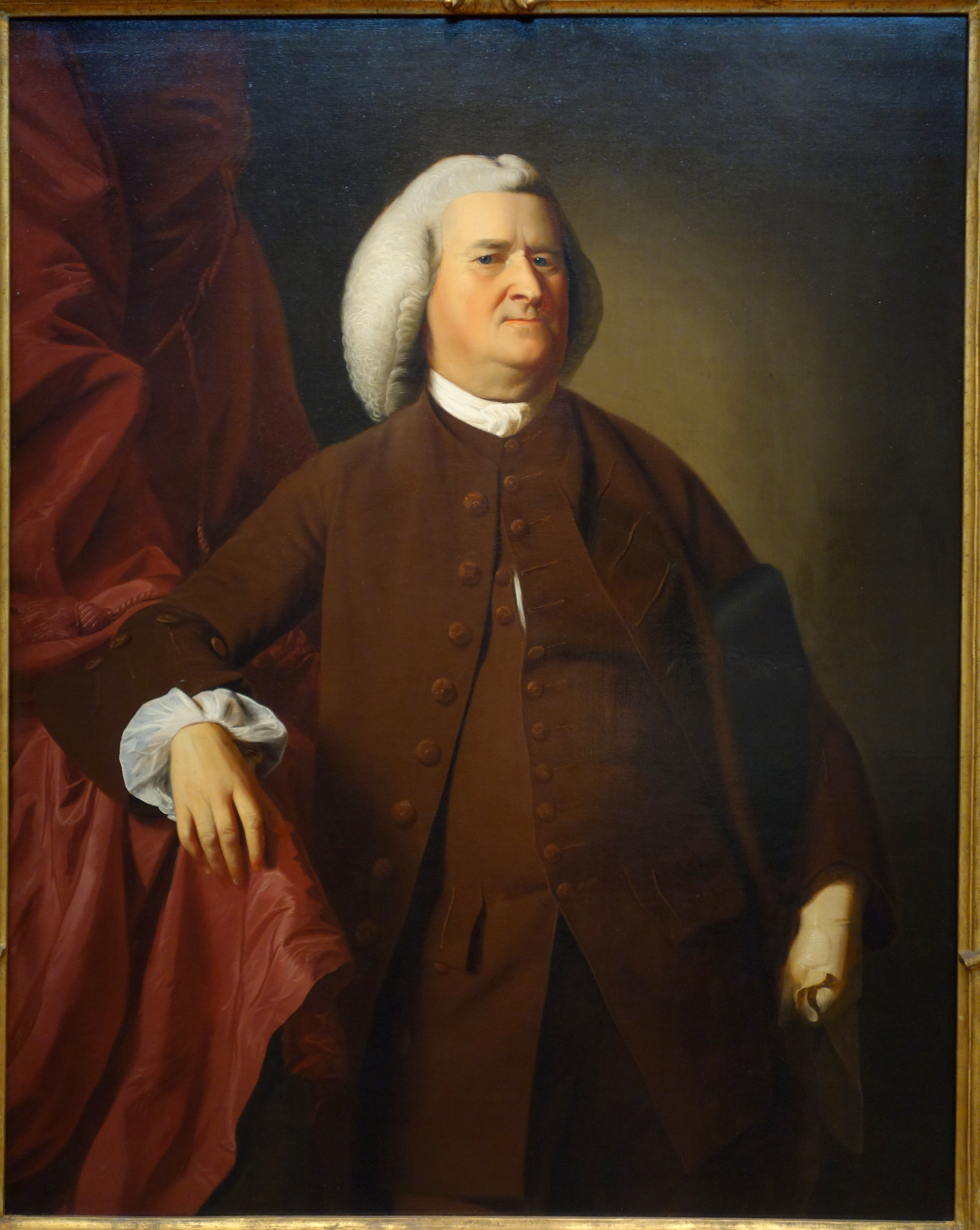
Joshua Henshaw

Joshua Henshaw (1746–1823) was a member of the Massachusetts Governor's Council. He was living in the Samuel Dexter House when George Washington spent the night on his way to New York following the Evacuation of Boston.

== Biography ==
Joshua Henshaw was born in Boston on February 16, 1746. He attended Boston Latin School in 1753, and graduated from Harvard College in 1763.

He married Catharine Hill on November 16, 1769. She died on September 7, 1822.

Henshaw died in Shrewsbury, Massachusetts on May 27, 1823.

== Works cited ==
- Hanson, Robert Brand (1976). Dedham, Massachusetts, 1635-1890. Dedham Historical Society.
- Hassam, John T. (March 1900). "Joshua Henshaw". Proceedings of the Massachusetts Historical Society. XXXIV: 58–68 – via Internet Archive.
