= Ratification of the United States Constitution by Massachusetts =

1788 decision by Massachusetts

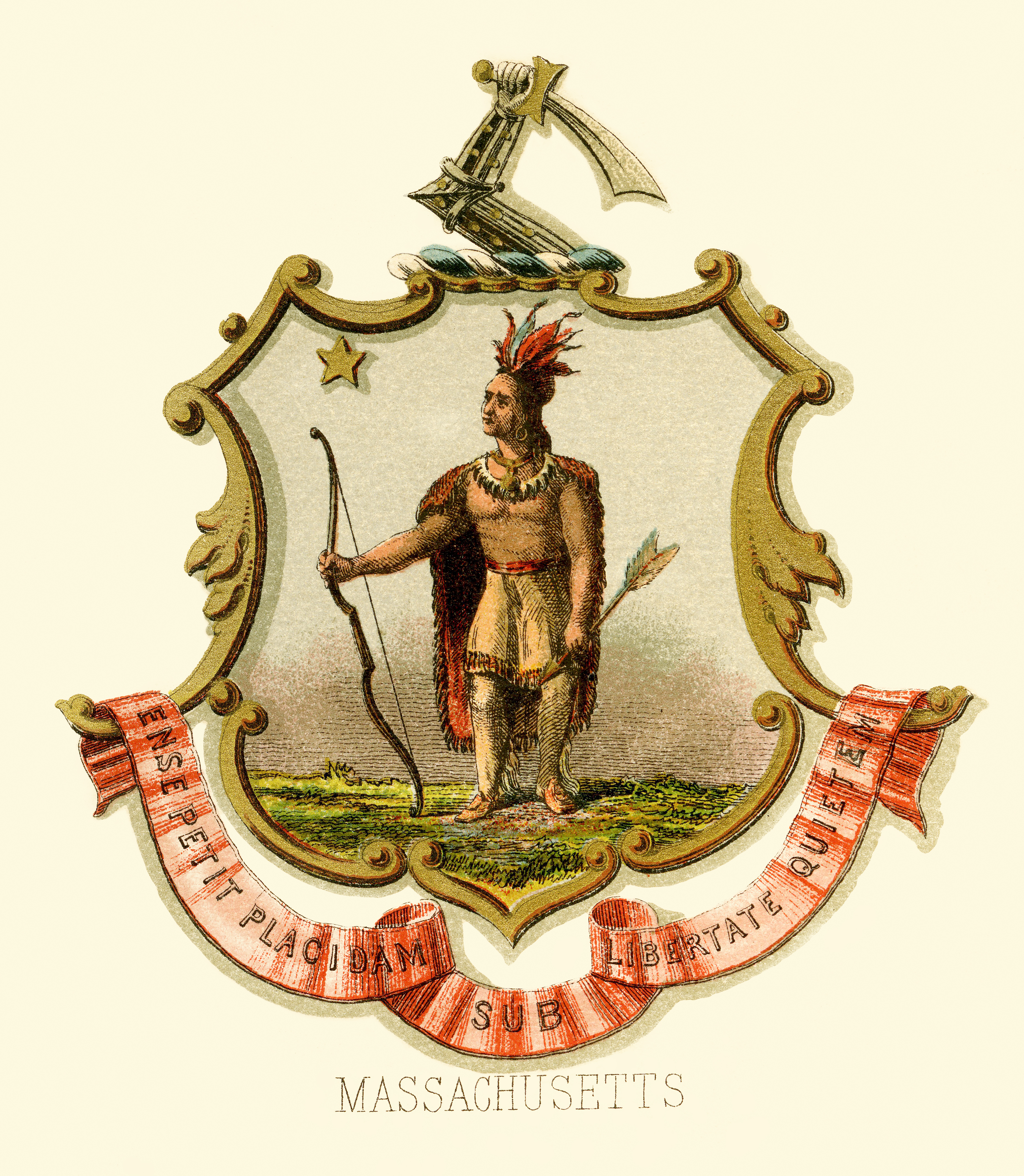
Massachusetts' coat of arms

The ratification of the United States Constitution by Massachusetts in 1788 was a proceeding that narrowly ratified the United States Constitution which went through after John Hancock and Samuel Adams expressed their support for the constitution.

== Background ==
Massachusetts' delegates to the Congress of the Confederation frequently opposed revisions to the Articles of Confederation because they saw the revisions “the great Bulwarks of Liberty” and that if the Articles of Confederation “are subject, on trivial or even important Occasions, to be revised & re-revised, altered & re-altered, they must cease to be considered as effectual & sacred Barriers.” The delegates preferred strong state governments over a strong central government rather than risk “general Dissentions & Animosities, which may approach to Anarchy & prepare the Way to a ruinous System of Government.”

By 1786, the people of Massachusetts generally supported giving the Congress of the Confederation expanded commercial powers. The University of Wisconsin–Madison cites Shay's Rebelion as an event that changed public perception of a constitutional convention. People such as Rufus King and Elbridge Gerry, were now in favor of a constitutional convention despite being previously opposed.

== Ratification ==
On October 18, 1787, the Massachusetts General Court called for a ratifying convention; 364 delegates represented 318 towns at the convention. 46 communities sent no representatives. Massachusetts's convention was the largest of any state. Notable Federalists at the convention were Nathaniel Gorham, King, Caleb Strong, and James Bowdoin. The Anti-Federalists at the convention didn't have a central leadership group. The meetings were moved briefly from the State House building to the Brattle Street Church, and then again to the Long Lane Congregational Church due to overcrowding concerns.

On January 9, 1788, then Governor Hancock was elected president of the Massachusetts Ratifying Convention by the delegates. Although Hancock was elected president of the convention, his gout prevented him from attending January 30. Some of the Federalists at the convention thought they needed to propose some amendments, which they chose Hancock to do because he was acceptable to both sides. At the time, Hancock had not taken a public position on the Constitution, but some Federalists believed that he would follow the will of the majority. Some Federalists, including King, believed that once Hancock figured out which side had the majority his health would improve. Hancock first attended the debates on January 30 due to the rumors spread by Anti-Federalists that Hancock didn't support the Constitution. From January 14 to February 4, several debates happened over the contents of the Constitution and Hancock's recommended amendments.

The Federalists caucused on the evening of that same day to, according to Gorham, prepare amendments. Tristam Dalton reported that Hancock and Adams now supported the constitution. The next day Hancock called for the convention to unconditionally ratify the Constitution and propose 9 amendments for the first Congress to consider. The debate continued until February 6, when the convention voted 187 to 168 to ratify the constitution. Counties on the coast were more likely to vote in favor of the constitution then ones inland. Hancock and William Cushing signed the documents the next day.
