= Amos Singletary =

American mill operator, lawyer, justice of the peace

Member of the Massachusetts House of Representatives
- In office 1781–1784

Member of the Massachusetts Senate
- In office 1787–1790

Personal details
- Born: September 1721 Sutton, Massachusetts, U.S.
- Died: October 30, 1806 (aged 85) Millbury, Massachusetts, U.S.
- Spouse: Mary Curtis (m. 1742; died 1798)
- Children: 9
- Relatives: Lou Singletary Bedford (great-granddaughter)
- Occupation: Justice of the peace Gristmill operator

Amos Singletary (September 1721 – October 30, 1806) was an American gristmill operator and justice of the peace from Sutton, Massachusetts, who served in both houses of the Massachusetts General Court (state legislature). An Anti-Federalist, he voted against the U.S. Constitution as a delegate to the Massachusetts Ratifying Convention. He was angered by perceived Federalist arrogance surrounding the adoption of the Constitution and thought that it provided too much power to the national government. He supported the American Revolution and wanted to limit wealthy Bostonians' sway over state politics.

== Early and personal life ==
He was born in Sutton, Worcester County, Massachusetts, in September 1721. He was the first male birth in the town, the youngest son of Mary Grelee (or Greele) and John Singletary, a farmer and tithingman. John had moved to Sutton around 1720 and soon bought a lot on which he built a gristmill for municipal use.

Singletary never attended school and learned only at home; despite this, town annals published in 1970 note that he was a keen learner in later life. An earnest Baptist, he signed a petition in 1742 asking for a parcel of land to be set aside in northern Sutton for a new church. In late 1747, several dozen churchgoers, including Singletary, broke off from the First Church of Sutton and formed their own in a part of town that is now Millbury. He was elected as a ruling elder of that church on February 4, 1768.

He married Mary Curtis, from Topsfield, on September 6, 1742; she died on June 28, 1798. They had nine children, six girls and three boys. (Note: Singletary's children were Greely (b. August 15, 1743), John (b. March 17, 1745), Mary (b. June 1747), Mehitable (b. March 13, 1749), Hannah (b. March 15, 1753), Azubah (b. December 9, 1754), Amos (b. March 11, 1757), Richard (b. November 9, 1760), and Thankful (b. October 30, 1762).) All worked in offices at the church, except his youngest, also named Amos, who town annals call a "profligate." (Note: The younger Amos Singletary had twelve children. He later moved to Millbury, Massachusetts, where he became poor and avoided religion, in stark contrast to his father's piety.) Singletary ran his father's gristmill along Singletary Stream from 1764 to 1777. He had purchased it from his brother, Richard, and later sold it to Abraham Waters.

== Political career ==
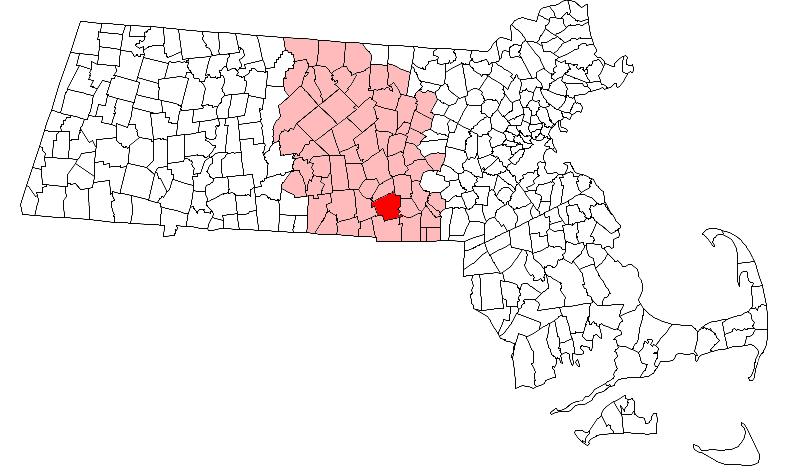
Singletary represented his hometown of Sutton (red, with Worcester County in pink) at various conventions.

On January 5, 1775, Singletary was elected to be a delegate of Sutton to the Massachusetts Provincial Congress in Cambridge held on February 1. Later, on May 22, he was elected again, to a second congress in Watertown on May 31. He was nominated to be a justice of the peace on September 18 of that year, entering politics upon assuming the office.

He and Willis Hall were elected May 19, 1777, to represent Sutton in the General Court in the coming year. In the next decade, Hall became the chair of Worcester County conventions that hoped to influence the Court; Singletary served in the House of Representatives in the 1781–82 and 1783–84 sessions, representing Sutton with Hall during the former. During the Revolutionary War, he was listed on a committee to train men in Worcester County to fight in New York and Canada, and as a legislator, he opposed eastern Massachusetts policies that, in his view, tormented western Massachusetts farmers.

He was chosen on September 25, 1786, to be a delegate to a county convention in Leicester to ask for the state capital to be moved out of Boston. Many residents of western Massachusetts resented the influence of Boston elites over the state legislature, which they felt was taxing the Western region too heavily. This resentment also motivated Shays' Rebellion, an armed uprising that had emerged that summer. The town of Sutton selected Singletary as part of a committee to try to mediate between active rebels and the state government, which had sent thousands of troops to suppress the uprising. The delegation managed to meet with General Benjamin Lincoln, though the rebellion continued for many months more.

== Constitution Ratifying Convention ==
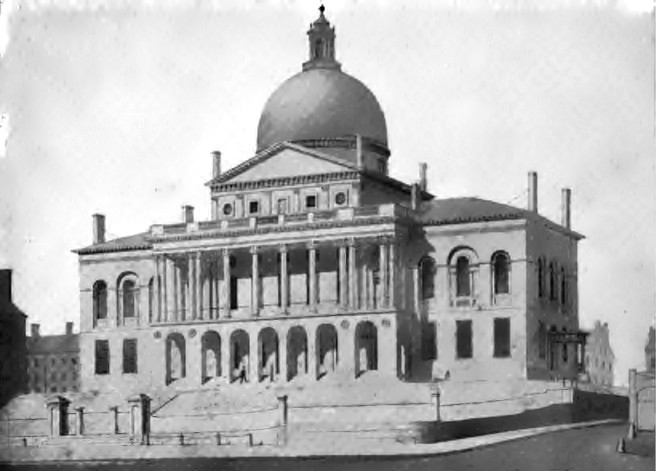
Debate on ratification of the Constitution lasted for almost a month at the Massachusetts State House.

Singletary is best known as a zealous, outspoken Anti-Federalist during Massachusetts's hearings on ratification of the United States Constitution in 1788. He and David Harwood became the delegates from Sutton on December 10, 1787, to the Massachusetts Ratifying Convention in Boston which began on January 9 of the next year. On January 25, 1788, over two weeks into the convention, Singletary spoke against the Constitution in response to Representative Fisher Ames.

He argued that the federal government's powers under the Constitution would be similar to those held by Great Britain, from which they had just won independence. He worried that the interests of the common people would not be protected and became furious with Federalists' immodesty on pushing for ratification. He insisted—breaking with some Anti-Federalists—that the national government should ensure that officials pass a religious test. Other demands included opposition to a standing army and stricter term limits to avoid life tenure. The Massachusetts Centinel reported a section of his speech:

We fought Great Britain—some said for a three-penny tax on tea; but it was not that. It was because they claimed a right to tax us and bind us in all cases whatever. And does not this same Constitution do the same? ... These lawyers and men of learning and money men, that talk so finely and gloss over matters so smoothly, to make us poor illiterate people swallow down the pill. ... They expect to be the managers of the Constitution, and get all the power and money into their own hands. And then they will swallow up all us little folks, just as the whale swallowed up Jonah!

Representative Jonathan Smith of Lanesborough responded. He cited Shays' Rebellion as justifying the need for a more centralized government, and said that the writers of the Constitution could be trusted. The Centinel quoted:

My honorable old daddy there [pointing to Singletary] won't think that I expect to be a Congressman, and swallow up the liberties of the people. I never had any post, nor do I want one. But I don't think the worse of the Constitution because lawyers, and men of learning, and moneyed men, are fond of it. I don't suspect that they want to get into Congress and abuse their power.

Although Singletary was not the only delegate to voice opposition, Massachusetts ratified the Constitution on February 7, 1788, with a 187–168 vote. Sutton annals write that several town members—along with other parts of the state—celebrated its ratification.

== Later politics and death ==
Singletary represented Sutton in the state senate, serving four consecutive one-year terms from 1787 to 1790. In the 1788 election, Singletary received 94% of his vote from Anti-Federalist towns in Worcester County and 4% from Federalist ones; compare this to the Federalist senator Moses Gill, also from Worcester, who received 83% from Anti-Federalist towns and 14% from Federalist ones.

According to historian Jon L. Wakelyn, "It is unclear whether Singletary took part in post-1789 politics. There is some indication that he had moved to Maine." He died on October 30, 1806, at age 85. His remains are interred in the County-Bridge Cemetery, on Providence Street along Blackstone River in Millbury, Massachusetts.

== Notes and references ==
Explanatory notes

Bibliography

- Bailey, Thomas A.; Kennedy, David M.; Cohen, Lizabeth (2006). The American Pageant (13th AP ed.). Houghton Mifflin. ISBN 978-0618479405.
- Benedict, William A.; Tracy, Hiram A. (1970). History of the town of Sutton, Massachusetts, from 1704 to 1876. Commonwealth Press. OCLC 15230284. OL 25582048M – via Internet Archive.
- Crane, John C.; Dunbar, Robert Wayland (1915). Centennial History of the Town of Millbury, Massachusetts. Millbury. LCCN 16003490. OL 13999300M – via Internet Archive.
- Dudley, William (1995). The Creation of the Constitution: Opposing Viewpoints. Greenhaven Press. ISBN 1565102215. LCCN 94009518 – via Internet Archive.
- Hall, Van Beck (1972). Politics Without Parties: Massachusetts, 1780–1791. University of Pittsburgh Press. ISBN 9780822975977 – via Internet Archive.
- O'Connor, Thomas H.; Rogers, Alan (1987). This Momentous Affair: Massachusetts and the Ratification of the Constitution of the United States. Trustees of the Public Library of the City of Boston. ISBN 0890730792. OCLC 17005208 – via Internet Archive.
- Wakelyn, Jon L. (2004). Birth of the Bill of Rights: Biographies. Greenwood Publishing Group. ISBN 9780313331947 – via Google Books.
- Whitney, Peter (1793). The History of the County of Worcester, in the Commonwealth of Massachusetts, Etc – via Google Books.
