= 1812–13 United States Senate elections =

- Dates vary by state
- Class 3

12 of the 36 seats in the United States Senate (plus special elections) 19 seats needed for a majority
	Majority party	Minority party
Party	Democratic-Republican	Federalist
Last election	27 seats	7 seats
Seats before	30	6
Seats won	8	4
Seats after	28	8
Seat change	▼2	▲2
Seats up	10	2
- Results: Federalist hold Federalist gain Dem-Republican hold Dem-Republican gain Legislature Failed To Elect
Majority Party before election
Democratic-Republican
Elected Majority Party
Democratic-Republican

The 1812–13 United States Senate elections were held on various dates in various states, coinciding with President James Madison's re-election. As these U.S. Senate elections were prior to the ratification of the Seventeenth Amendment in 1913, senators were chosen by state legislatures. Senators were elected over a wide range of time throughout 1812 and 1813, and a seat may have been filled months late or remained vacant due to legislative deadlock. In these elections, terms were up for the senators in Class 3.

The Democratic-Republican Party lost two seats but still retained an overwhelming Senate majority. As in recent elections, the minority Federalist Party had gone into the elections with such a small share of Senate seats (6 out of 36, or 16.7%) that if they had won every one of the elections, they would still not have controlled a majority.

== Change in composition ==
=== Before the elections ===
Composition after September 1812 elections in the new state of Louisiana.

DR_{8}	DR_{7}	DR_{6}	DR_{5}	DR_{4}	DR_{3}	DR_{2}	DR_{1}		
DR_{9}	DR_{10}	DR_{11}	DR_{12}	DR_{13}	DR_{14}	DR_{15}	DR_{16}	DR_{17}	DR_{18}
Majority →									DR_{19}
DR_{28} Pa. Retired	DR_{27} Ohio; Retired	DR_{26} N.C. Retired	DR_{25} Ky. Retired	DR_{24} Md. Unknown	DR_{23} La. Unknown	DR_{22} S.C. Ran	DR_{21} N.Y. Ran	DR_{20} Ga. Ran	DR_{19}
DR_{29} Vt. Retired	F_{7} N.H. Ran	F_{6} Conn. Ran	F_{5}	F_{4}	F_{3}	F_{2}	F_{1}		

=== Result of the regular elections ===
DR_{8}	DR_{7}	DR_{6}	DR_{5}	DR_{4}	DR_{3}	DR_{2}	DR_{1}		
DR_{9}	DR_{10}	DR_{11}	DR_{12}	DR_{13}	DR_{14}	DR_{15}	DR_{16}	DR_{17}	DR_{18}
Majority →									DR_{19}
V_{1} Md. DR Loss	DR_{27} S.C. Re-elected	DR_{26} Ga. Re-elected	DR_{25} Vt. Hold	DR_{24} Pa. Hold	DR_{23} Ohio; Hold	DR_{22} N.C. Hold	DR_{21} La. Hold	DR_{20} Ky. Hold	DR_{19}
V_{2} N.H. F Loss	F_{6} N.Y. Gain	F_{5} Conn. Re-elected	F_{5}	F_{4}	F_{3}	F_{2}	F_{1}		

Key:

DR_{#}	Democratic-Republican
F_{#}	Federalist
V_{#}	Vacant

== Race summaries ==
=== Special elections during the 12th Congress ===
In these special elections, the winners were seated during 1812 or before March 4, 1813; ordered by election date.

State	Incumbent			Results	Candidates
State	Senator	Party	Electoral history	Results	Candidates
Louisiana (Class 2)	None (new state)			Louisiana was admitted to the Union on April 30, 1812. Inaugural senator elected September 3, 1812. Democratic-Republican gain.	▌ ✓ Jean Destréhan (Democratic-Republican) 21; ▌ ✓ Allan Magruder (Democratic-Republican) 21; ▌James Brown (Democratic-Republican) 16; ▌Eligius Fromentin (Democratic-Republican) 5; ▌Livingston (Unknown) 3
Louisiana (Class 3)	None (new state)			Louisiana was admitted to the Union on April 30, 1812. Inaugural senator elected September 3, 1812. Democratic-Republican gain.	▌ ✓ Jean Destréhan (Democratic-Republican) 21; ▌ ✓ Allan Magruder (Democratic-Republican) 21; ▌James Brown (Democratic-Republican) 16; ▌Eligius Fromentin (Democratic-Republican) 5; ▌Livingston (Unknown) 3
Louisiana (Class 2)	Thomas Posey	Democratic- Republican	1812 (appointed)	Jean Destréhan had resigned October 1, 1812 without having qualified. Interim successor appointed October 8, 1812. Interim appointee lost election. New senator elected February 4, 1813 on the second ballot. Democratic-Republican hold.	▌ ✓ James Brown (Democratic-Republican) 26; ▌Thomas Posey (Democratic-Republican) 14; ▌Fulwar Skipwith (Unknown) Eliminated

=== Races leading to the 13th Congress ===
In these regular elections, the winner was seated on March 4, 1813 (except where noted due to late election); ordered by state.

All of the elections involved the Class 3 seats.

State	Incumbent			Results	Candidates
State	Senator	Party	Electoral history	Results	Candidates
Connecticut	Chauncey Goodrich	Federalist	1807 (special)	Incumbent re-elected in 1813.	▌ ✓ Chauncey Goodrich (Federalist); [data missing]
Georgia	Charles Tait	Democratic- Republican	1809 (special)	Incumbent re-elected in 1813.	▌ ✓ Charles Tait (Democratic-Republican); [data missing]
Kentucky	John Pope	Democratic- Republican	1806	Incumbent retired. New senator elected January 12, 1813 on the third ballot. Democratic-Republican hold.	▌ ✓ Jesse Bledsoe (Democratic-Republican) 56; ▌Stephen Ormsby (Democratic-Republican) 51; ▌Anthony Butler (Unknown) Eliminated; ▌Isham Talbot (Democratic-Republican) Eliminated
Louisiana	Allan B. Magruder	Democratic- Republican	1812	Incumbent retired or lost re-election. New senator elected in 1813. Democratic-Republican hold.	▌ ✓ Eligius Fromentin (Democratic-Republican) 25; ▌Thomas Posey (Democratic-Republican) 13; ▌Richard Butler (Unknown) 6; Blank
Maryland	Philip Reed	Democratic- Republican	1806 (special); 1806	Incumbent retired or lost re-election. Legislature failed to elect. Democratic-Republican loss.	[data missing]
New Hampshire	Charles Cutts	Federalist	1810 (special)	Incumbent lost re-election. Legislature failed to elect after 12 ballots. Federalist loss.	▌Jedediah Kilburn Smith (Democratic-Republican) 89; ▌John Goddard (Unknown) 83; ▌Charles Cutts (Federalist) 3; ▌David L. Morril (Democratic-Republican) 1
New York	John Smith	Democratic- Republican	1804 (special); 1807	Incumbent lost re-election. New senator elected February 2, 1813. Federalist gain.	▌ ✓ Rufus King (Federalist) 51.5%; ▌James W. Wilkin (Democratic-Republican) 46.2%; ▌John Smith (Democratic-Republican) 2.3%
North Carolina	Jesse Franklin	Democratic- Republican	1799; 1804 (lost); 1806	Incumbent retired. New senator elected in 1812. Democratic-Republican hold.	▌ ✓ David Stone (Democratic-Republican) 100; ▌Archibald Murphey (Democratic-Republican) 83; ▌Thomas Davis (Democratic-Republican) 12
Ohio	Alexander Campbell	Democratic- Republican	1809 (special)	Incumbent retired. New senator elected February 6, 1813. Democratic-Republican hold.	▌ ✓ Jeremiah Morrow (Democratic-Republican) 63; ▌Calvin Pease (Unknown) 18
Pennsylvania	Andrew Gregg	Democratic- Republican	1806	Incumbent retired. New senator elected December 8, 1812. Democratic-Republican hold.	▌ ✓ Abner Lacock (Democratic-Republican) 63; ▌Daniel Montgomery Jr. (Democratic-Republican) 26; ▌James Brady (Independent) 22; ▌Isaac Weaver Jr. (Democratic-Republican) 6; Not voting 5
South Carolina	John Gaillard	Democratic- Republican	1804 (special); 1806	Incumbent re-elected in late 1812.	▌ ✓ John Gaillard (Democratic-Republican) 118; ▌Henry Middleton (Democratic-Republican) 37; ▌James Gowdy (Unknown) 1
Vermont	Stephen R. Bradley	Democratic- Republican	1791; 1795 (lost); 1801 (special); 1806	Incumbent retired. New senator elected October 21, 1812. Democratic-Republican hold.	▌ ✓ Dudley Chase (Democratic-Republican); ▌Royall Tyler (Democratic-Republican) 94; Scattering 4

=== Special elections during the 13th Congress ===
In these special elections, the winners were seated in 1813 after March 4; ordered by election date.

State	Incumbent			Results	Candidates
State	Senator	Party	Electoral history	Results	Candidates
Massachusetts (Class 1)	James Lloyd	Federalist	1808 (special); 1808	Resigned May 1, 1813. New senator elected May 5, 1813. Federalist hold.	▌ ✓ Christopher Gore (Federalist) 381; ▌William King (Democratic-Republican) 10; Scattering 102
Connecticut (Class 3)	Chauncey Goodrich	Federalist	1807 (special); 1812	Incumbent resigned May 13, 1813 to become Lieutenant Governor of Connecticut. New senator elected May 13, 1813. Federalist hold.	▌ ✓ David Daggett (Federalist); [data missing]
Maryland (Class 3)	Vacant			Legislature had failed to elect. New senator elected May 21, 1813. Federalist gain.	▌ ✓ Robert Henry Goldsborough (Federalist) 53; ▌Edward Lloyd (Democratic-Republican) 35
Delaware (Class 2)	James A. Bayard	Federalist	1804 (special); 1805; 1811	Resigned March 3, 1813. New senator elected May 21, 1813. Federalist hold.	▌ ✓ William H. Wells (Federalist) 14; ▌George Monro (Democratic-Republican) 10; ▌Richard Bassett (Federalist) 1
New Hampshire (Class 3)	Charles Cutts	Federalist	1810 (special); 1813 (appointed)	Interim appointee lost election. New senator elected June 10, 1813 on the second ballot. Federalist hold.	▌ ✓ Jeremiah Mason (Federalist) 129; ▌Charles Cutts (Federalist) 39; ▌John Goddard (Unknown) Eliminated; Scattering 4
Georgia (Class 2)	William Bulloch	Democratic- Republican	1813 (appointed)	Interim appointee retired or lost re-election. New senator elected November 6, 1813. Democratic-Republican hold.	▌ ✓ William W. Bibb (Democratic-Republican) 79; ▌J. Macintosh (Unknown) 39

== Maryland ==
=== Maryland (regular) ===
The Maryland legislature failed to elect a senator before the March 3, 1813, the beginning of the term. Robert Henry Goldsborough was appointed to fill the seat.

=== Maryland (special) ===
1813 United States Senate special election in Maryland
- May 20, 1813

80 members of the Maryland General Assembly
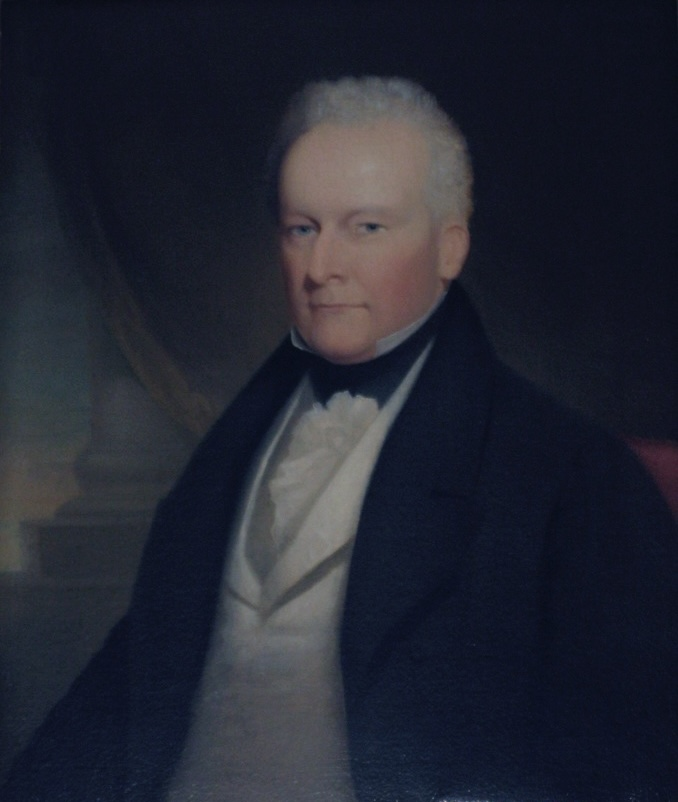
Candidate	Robert Henry Goldsborough	Edward Lloyd
Party	Federalist	Democratic-Republican
Legislative vote	47	35
Percentage	58.75%	41.25%

Robert H. Goldsborough won election over Edward Lloyd by a margin of 20.45%, or 18 votes, for the Class 3 seat.

== See also ==
- 1812 United States elections
  - 1812–13 United States House of Representatives elections
  - 1812 United States presidential election
- 12th United States Congress
- 13th United States Congress
