= 1816–17 United States Senate elections =

- Dates vary by state
- Class 2

12 of the 36 seats in the United States Senate (plus special elections) 19 seats needed for a majority
	Majority party	Minority party
Party	Democratic-Republican	Federalist
Last election	26 seats	11 seats
Seats before	23	12
Seats won	9	3
Seats after	25	13
Seat change	▲2	▲1
Seats up	9	2
- Results: Federalist hold Federalist gain Dem-Republican hold Dem-Republican gain Legislature Failed To Elect
Majority Party before election
Democratic-Republican
Elected Majority Party
Democratic-Republican

The 1816–17 United States Senate elections were held on various dates in various states. As these U.S. Senate elections were prior to the ratification of the Seventeenth Amendment in 1913, senators were chosen by state legislatures. Senators were elected over a wide range of time throughout 1816 and 1817, and a seat may have been filled months late or remained vacant due to legislative deadlock. In these elections, terms were up for the senators in Class 2.

The Democratic-Republican Party gained a net of two seats from the admission of a new U.S. state, under the name of Indiana.

== Results summary ==
Senate party division, 15th Congress (1817–1819)

- Majority party: Democratic-Republican (25–28)
- Minority party: Federalist (13–12)
- Total seats: 38–42

== Change in composition ==
=== Results of the January 1816 special elections ===
DR_{8}	DR_{7}	DR_{6}	DR_{5}	DR_{4}	DR_{3}	DR_{2}	DR_{1}		
DR_{9}	DR_{10}	DR_{11}	DR_{12}	DR_{13}	DR_{14}	DR_{15}	DR_{16}	DR_{17}	DR_{18}
Majority →									DR_{19}
F_{9} Md. Gain	F_{10}	F_{11}	F_{12}	F_{13}	DR_{23}	DR_{22}	DR_{21} Va. Gain	DR_{20}	DR_{19}
F_{8}	F_{7}	F_{6}	F_{5}	F_{4}	F_{3}	F_{2}	F_{1}		

=== Before the general elections ===
DR_{9}	DR_{8}	DR_{7}	DR_{6}	DR_{5}	DR_{4}	DR_{3}	DR_{2}	DR_{1}	
DR_{10}	DR_{11}	DR_{12}	DR_{13}	DR_{14}	DR_{15} Ga. Resigned	DR_{16} La. Ran	DR_{17} Mass. Unknown	DR_{18} N.J. Unknown	DR_{19} N.C. Resigned
Majority →									DR_{20} R.I. Retired
F_{10}	F_{11} Del. Ran	F_{12} Ky. Retired	F_{13} N.H. Unknown	TBD_{1} Ind. New seat	TBD_{2} Ind. New seat	DR_{23} Va. Unknown	DR_{22} Tenn. Unknown	DR_{21} S.C. Resigned	DR_{20} R.I. Retired
F_{9}	F_{8}	F_{7}	F_{6}	F_{5}	F_{4}	F_{3}	F_{2}	F_{1}	

=== Results of the general elections ===
DR_{9}	DR_{8}	DR_{7}	DR_{6}	DR_{5}	DR_{4}	DR_{3}	DR_{2}	DR_{1}	
DR_{10}	DR_{11}	DR_{12}	DR_{13}	DR_{14}	DR_{15} Ga. Hold	DR_{16} Ind. Gain	DR_{17} Ind. Gain	DR_{18} Ky. Gain	DR_{19} La. Hold
Majority →									DR_{20} N.H. Gain
F_{10}	F_{11} Del. Hold	F_{12} Mass. Gain	F_{13} R.I. Gain	V_{1} Tenn. DR Loss	DR_{24} Va. Hold	DR_{23} S.C. Hold	DR_{22} N.C. Hold	DR_{21} N.J. Hold	DR_{20} N.H. Gain
F_{9}									
F_{9}	F_{8}	F_{7}	F_{6}	F_{5}	F_{4}	F_{3}	F_{2}	F_{1}	

=== Results of the 1817 special elections ===
DR_{10}	DR_{9}	DR_{8}	DR_{7}	DR_{6}	DR_{5}	DR_{4}	DR_{3}	DR_{2}	DR_{1}
DR_{11}	DR_{12}	DR_{13}	DR_{14}	DR_{15}	DR_{16}	DR_{17}	DR_{18}	DR_{19}	DR_{20}
Majority →									DR_{21}
F_{11}	F_{12}	DR_{28} Tenn. Elected (Note: Appointee elected)	DR_{27} N.H. Gain	DR_{26} Miss. New seat	DR_{25} Miss. New seat	DR_{24} Vt. Hold	DR_{23}	DR_{22}	DR_{21}
F_{10}	F_{9}	F_{8}	F_{7}	F_{6}	F_{5}	F_{4}	F_{3}	F_{2}	F_{1}

Key

DR_{#}	Democratic-Republican
F_{#}	Federalist
V_{#}	Vacant

== Race summaries ==
=== Elections during the preceding Congress ===
In these special and general elections, the winners were seated during 1816 or before March 4, 1817; ordered by election date.

State	Incumbent			Results	Candidates
State	Senator	Party	Electoral history	Results	Candidates
Virginia (Class 2)	Vacant			William B. Giles (DR) resigned March 3, 1815. John Wayles Eppes (DR) was elected December 7, 1815, but declined to serve. New senator elected January 3, 1816 on the fourth ballot despite being too young to serve. Democratic-Republican gain. Winner later lost re-election to the next term; see below.	▌ ✓ Armistead T. Mason (Democratic-Republican) 128; Scattering 33
Maryland (Class 1)	Vacant			The Maryland General Assembly failed to elect in time for the March 4, 1815 beginning of the term. New senator elected January 29, 1816. Federalist gain.	▌ ✓ Robert Harper (Federalist) 45; ▌John T. Mason (Democratic-Republican) 44
Massachusetts (Class 1)	Christopher Gore	Federalist	1813 (appointed); 1815 (special)	Incumbent resigned May 30, 1816, unhappy with the politics of Washington and suffering from poor health. New senator elected June 12, 1816. Federalist hold.	▌ ✓ Eli P. Ashmun (Federalist) 158; Scattering 137
Indiana (Class 1)	None (new state)			Indiana was admitted to the Union December 11, 1816. New senator elected November 8, 1816. Democratic-Republican gain.	▌ ✓ James Noble (Democratic-Republican) 26; ▌ ✓ Waller Taylor (Democratic-Republican) 20; ▌James Scott (Unknown) 16; ▌Jesse L. Holman (Unknown) 3; ▌Ezra Ferris (Unknown) 2; ▌Davis Floyd (Democratic-Republican) 2; ▌Walter Wilson (Unknown) 2; ▌Elias MacNamee (Unknown) 1
Indiana (Class 3)	None (new state)			Indiana was admitted to the Union December 11, 1816. New senator elected November 8, 1816. Democratic-Republican gain.	▌ ✓ James Noble (Democratic-Republican) 26; ▌ ✓ Waller Taylor (Democratic-Republican) 20; ▌James Scott (Unknown) 16; ▌Jesse L. Holman (Unknown) 3; ▌Ezra Ferris (Unknown) 2; ▌Davis Floyd (Democratic-Republican) 2; ▌Walter Wilson (Unknown) 2; ▌Elias MacNamee (Unknown) 1
Georgia (Class 2)	William W. Bibb	Democratic- Republican	1813 (special)	Incumbent resigned November 9, 1816. New senator elected November 13, 1816. Democratic-Republican hold. Winner was also elected to the next term; see below.	▌ ✓ George M. Troup (Democratic-Republican) 62; ▌[FNU] Clark (Unknown) 49; ▌[FNU] Spalding (Unknown) 6
North Carolina (Class 2)	James Turner	Democratic- Republican	1804; 1810	Incumbent resigned November 21, 1816 due to ill health. New senator elected December 4, 1816 on the third ballot. Democratic-Republican hold. Winner was also elected to the next term; see below.	▌ ✓ Montfort Stokes (Democratic-Republican) 98; ▌John Branch (Democratic-Republican) 87
South Carolina (Class 2)	John Taylor	Democratic- Republican	1810 (special); 1810	Incumbent resigned November 1816. New senator elected December 4, 1816. Democratic-Republican hold. Winner was also elected to the next term; see below.	▌ ✓ William Smith (Democratic-Republican) 101; ▌James R. Pringle (Unknown) 51
Kentucky (Class 2)	Martin D. Hardin	Federalist	1814 (appointed)	Incumbent appointee elected December 5, 1816. Winner was not later a candidate for the next term; see below.	▌ ✓ Martin D. Hardin (Democratic-Republican) 74; ▌Samuel H. Woodson (Democratic-Republican) 31; ▌Norborn B. Beall (Democratic-Republican) 12; ▌Matthew Lyon (Democratic-Republican) 2
Maryland (Class 1)	Robert Goodloe Harper	Federalist	1816 (special)	Incumbent resigned December 6, 1816. New senator elected December 20, 1816. Federalist hold.	▌ ✓ Alexander C. Hanson (Federalist) 46; ▌William H. Winder (Federalist) 39; ▌Scattering (Federalist) 3

=== Races leading to the next Congress ===
In these general elections, the winners were seated March 4, 1817; ordered by state.

All of the elections involved the Class 2 seats.

State	Incumbent			Results	Candidates
State	Senator	Party	Electoral history	Results	Candidates
Delaware	William H. Wells	Federalist	1799 (special); 1799; 1804 (resigned); 1813 (special)	Incumbent lost re-election. New senator elected January 31, 1817 on the third ballot. Federalist hold.	▌ ✓ Nicholas Van Dyke (Federalist) 14; ▌William Hill Wells (Federalist) 11; ▌James Tilton (Democratic-Republican) 1
Georgia	William W. Bibb	Democratic- Republican	1813 (special)	Resigned November 9, 1816. New senator elected November 13, 1816 on the second ballot. Winner was also elected to finish the previous term; see above. Democratic-Republican hold.	▌ ✓ George M. Troup (Democratic-Republican) 62; ▌[FNU] Clark (Unknown) 49; ▌[FNU] Spalding (Unknown) 6
Kentucky	Martin D. Hardin	Federalist	1816 (appointed); 1816 (special)	Incumbent retired. New senator elected December 10, 1816 on the second ballot. Democratic-Republican gain.	▌ ✓ John J. Crittenden (Democratic-Republican) 72; ▌John Adair (Federalist) 47
Louisiana	James Brown	Democratic- Republican	1813 (special)	Incumbent lost re-election. New senator elected in 1817. Democratic-Republican hold.	▌ ✓ William C. C. Claiborne (Democratic-Republican) 27; ▌James Brown (Democratic-Republican) 22; Blank 1
Massachusetts	Joseph Bradley Varnum	Democratic-Republican	1811	Incumbent ran for re-election. New senator elected June 12, 1816. Federalist gain.	▌ ✓ Harrison Gray Otis (Federalist) 183; ▌John Holmes (Democratic-Republican) 130; ▌Levi Lincoln Jr. (Democratic-Republican) 6; Scattering 5
New Hampshire	Thomas W. Thompson	Federalist	1814 (special)	Unknown if incumbent ran for re-election. New senator elected in 1816 on the third ballot. Democratic-Republican gain.	▌ ✓ David L. Morrill (Democratic-Republican) 92; ▌John F. Parrott (Democratic-Republican) 86; Scattering 5
New Jersey	John Condit	Democratic- Republican	1809 (special); 1810	New senator elected January 23, 1817. Democratic-Republican hold.	▌ ✓ Mahlon Dickerson (Democratic-Republican); Unopposed
North Carolina	James Turner	Democratic- Republican	1804; 1810	Resigned November 21, 1816 due to ill health. New senator elected December 4, 1816 on the second ballot. Winner was also elected to finish the previous term; see above. Democratic-Republican hold.	▌ ✓ Montfort Stokes (Democratic-Republican) 96; ▌Bartlett Yancey (Democratic-Republican) 91; [data missing]
Rhode Island	Jeremiah Howell	Democratic- Republican	1810	Incumbent retired. New senator elected June 21, 1816. Federalist gain.	▌ ✓ James Burrill Jr. (Federalist) Unanimous
South Carolina	John Taylor	Democratic- Republican	1810 (special); 1810	Incumbent resigned November 1816. New senator elected December 4, 1816. Winner was also elected to the previous term, see above. Democratic-Republican hold.	▌ ✓ William Smith (Democratic-Republican) 101; ▌James R. Pringle (Unknown) 51
Tennessee	John Williams	Democratic- Republican	1815 (special)	Unknown if incumbent ran for re-election. Legislature failed to elect. Incumbent was appointed to start the term. Democratic-Republican loss.	None.
Virginia	Armistead T. Mason	Democratic-Republican	1816 (special)	Unknown if incumbent ran for re-election, but he was an unsuccessful candidate for the U.S. House of Representatives. New senator elected December 9, 1816. Democratic-Republican hold.	▌ ✓ John W. Eppes (Democratic-Republican) 103; ▌John Mercer (Democratic-Republican) 93

=== Elections during the next Congress ===
In three special elections and two general elections, the winners were elected in 1817 after March 4; ordered by election date.

State	Incumbent			Results	Candidates
State	Senator	Party	Electoral history	Results	Candidates
New Hampshire (Class 3)	Jeremiah Mason	Federalist	1813 (special)	Incumbent resigned June 16, 1817. New senator elected June 27, 1817 on the thirteenth ballot. Democratic-Republican gain.	▌ ✓ Clement Storer (Democratic-Republican); ▌Jeremiah Smith (Federalist) (Note: "An unfortunate disagreement among some of the members of the House, with regard to a candidate for Senator to Congress, was the occasion of several ballotings before a choice could be made. The Hon. CLEMENT STORER, was however, elected by the unanimous voice of the Republican members of the Senate, which vote was concurred by the House, on Thursday, by a plurality of eleven votes.") (Note: "The ballotings for a Senator to Congress, (after 13 trials, in which 33 persons were voted for) resulted in the choice of the Hon. CLEMENT STORER, by a majority of 8 or 10." Farmer's Cabinet (Amherst, NH). July 5, 1817.)
Tennessee (Class 2)	John Williams	Democratic- Republican	1815 (special)	Legislature had failed to elect and the incumbent was then appointed to start the term. Interim appointee was re-elected October 2, 1817 to finish the term.	▌ ✓ John Williams (Democratic-Republican) 51; Unopposed
Vermont (Class 3)	Dudley Chase	Democratic- Republican	1812	Resigned November 3, 1817. New senator elected November 4, 1817. Democratic-Republican hold.	▌ ✓ James Fisk (Democratic-Republican); [data missing]
Mississippi (Class 1)	None (new state)			Mississippi was admitted as a new state. New senator elected December 10, 1817 on the fifth ballot. Democratic-Republican gain.	▌ ✓ Walter Leake (Democratic-Republican) 15; ▌Christopher Rankin (Democratic-Republican) 8; ▌Cowles Mead (Democratic-Republican) 5; ▌Thomas H. Williams (Democratic-Republican) 1
Mississippi (Class 2)	None (new state)			Mississippi was admitted as a new state. New senator elected December 10, 1817 on the fourth ballot. Democratic-Republican gain.	▌ ✓ Thomas H. Williams (Democratic-Republican) 16; ▌Cowles Mead (Democratic-Republican) 12; ▌Christopher Rankin (Democratic-Republican) 1

== Indiana ==
Indiana's senators

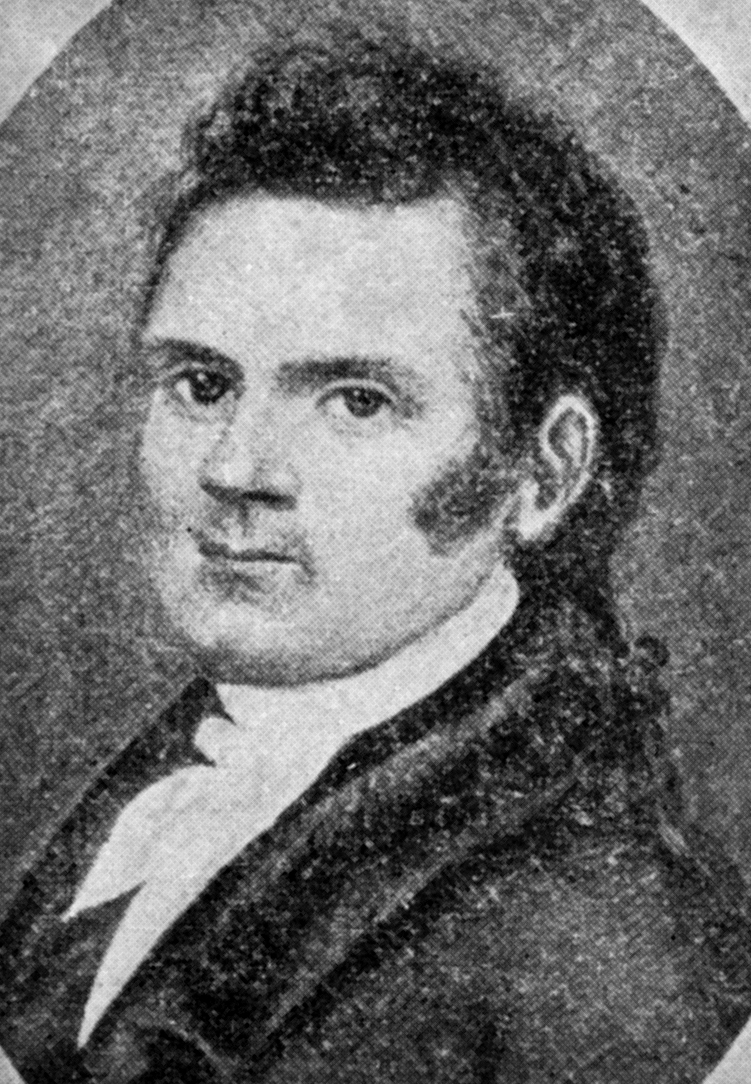
James Noble (DR)
(Class 1)

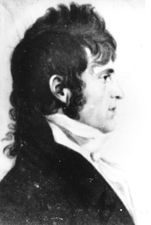
Waller Taylor (DR)
(Class 3)

The new state of Indiana elected its first two senators, both Democratic-Republicans, James Noble and Waller Taylor. The election was held November 8, 1816 in advance of Indiana's December 11, 1816 admission as a state. In the election legislators cast a single ballot and the first and second place candidates were deemed elected.

- ✓ James Noble (Democratic-Republican) 265 votes
- ✓ Waller Taylor (Democratic-Republican) 20 votes
- James Scott 16 votes
- Jesse L. Holman 3 votes
- Ezra Ferris 2 votes
- Davis Floyd 2 votes
- Walter Wilson 2 votes
- Elias MacNamee 1 vote

== Maryland (special) ==
=== Maryland (special, January 1816) ===
1816 United States Senate special election in Maryland
- January 27, 1816

80 members of the Maryland General Assembly
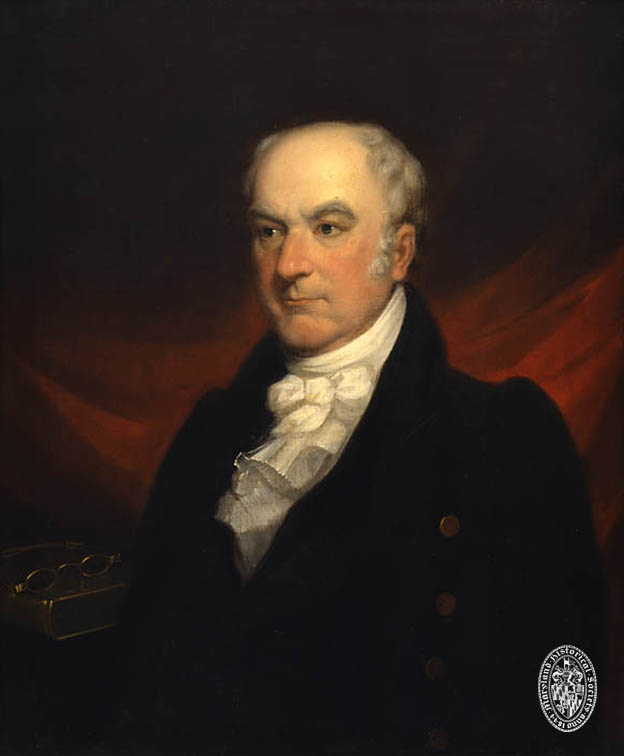
Candidate	Robert Goodloe Harper	John Thomson Mason
Party	Federalist
Legislative vote	45	44
Percentage	50.56%	49.44%

Robert Goodloe Harper won election over John Thomson Mason by a margin of 1.12%, or 1 vote, for the Class 1 seat.

=== Maryland (special, December 1816) ===
1816 United States Senate special election in Maryland
- January 27, 1816

80 members of the Maryland General Assembly
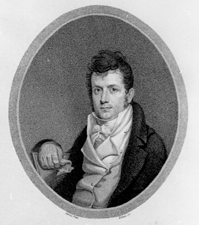
Candidate	Alexander Contee Hanson	William Winder
Party	Federalist	Democratic-Republican
Legislative vote	46	39
Percentage	54.12%	45.88%

Alexander Contee Hanson won election over William Winder by a margin of 8.24%, or 7 votes, for the Class 1 seat.

== Mississippi ==
Mississippi's senators

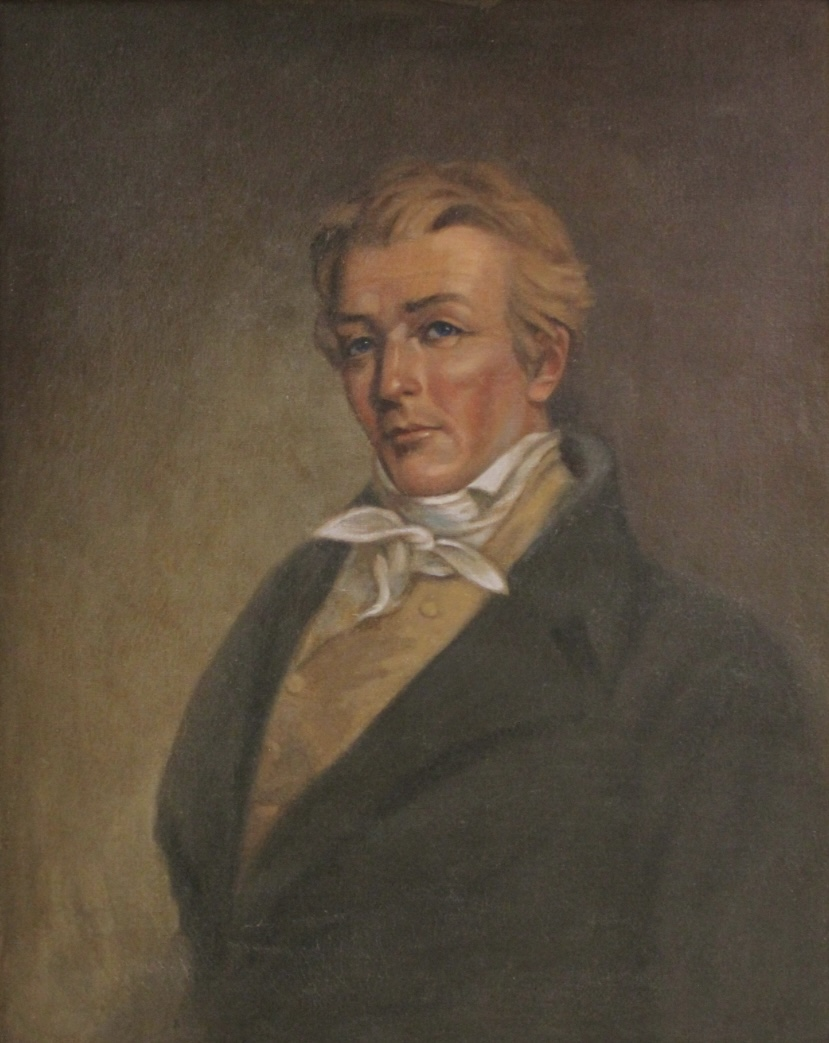
Walter Leake (DR)
(Class 1)

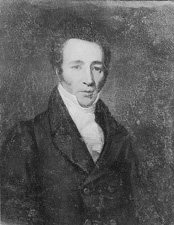
Thomas H. Williams (DR)
(Class 2)

The new state of Mississippi elected its first two senators, both Democratic-Republicans, Walter Leake and Thomas H. Williams. Two separate elections were held in which each senator was elected.

First Senator (Class 1)
(5th ballot, date and previous ballots unknown)

- ✓ Walter Leake (Democratic-Republican) 15 votes
- Christopher Rankin 8 votes
- Cowles Mead 5 votes
- Thomas H. Williams 1 vote

Second Senator (Class 2)
(4th ballot, date and previous ballots unknown)

- ✓ Thomas H. Williams (Democratic-Republican) 16 votes
- Cowles Mead 12 votes
- Christopher Rankin 1 vote

== See also ==
- 1816 United States elections
  - 1816 United States presidential election
  - 1816–17 United States House of Representatives elections
- 14th United States Congress
- 15th United States Congress
