= 1810–11 United States Senate elections =

- Dates vary by state
- Class 2

11 of the 34 seats in the United States Senate (plus special elections) 18 seats needed for a majority
	Majority party	Minority party
Party	Democratic-Republican	Federalist
Seats before	26	8
Seats after	26	7
Seat change	Steady	▼1
Seats up	8	2
Races won	8	1
- Results: Federalist hold Dem-Republican hold Legislature Failed To Elect
Majority Party before election
Democratic-Republican
Elected Majority Party
Democratic-Republican

The 1810–11 United States Senate elections were held on various dates in various states. As these U.S. Senate elections were prior to the ratification of the Seventeenth Amendment in 1913, senators were chosen by state legislatures. Senators were elected over a wide range of time throughout 1810 and 1811, and a seat may have been filled months late or remained vacant due to legislative deadlock. In these elections, terms were up for the senators in Class 2.

The Democratic-Republican Party maintained their Senate majority. The minority Federalist Party had gone into the elections with such a small share of Senate seats (8 out of 34, or 23.5%) that, had they won all of the elections, they would still not have reached a majority.

== Change in composition ==
=== Senate Composition in 1809 ===
Democratic-Republicans: 28 seats Federalists: 6 seats

=== Senate Composition in 1811 ===
Democratic-Republicans: 30 seats Federalists: 6 seats

=== Key Changes ===
Democratic-Republicans: The Democratic-Republicans gained 2 seats, increasing their majority from 28 to 30 seats. Federalists: The number of Federalist seats remained unchanged at 6.

=== Context ===
The Democratic-Republican Party continued to dominate the United States Senate during this period, reflecting the broader political landscape of the early 19th century. Following the decline of the Federalist Party after the election of 1800, Democratic-Republicans held a clear majority in both chambers of Congress for much of the decade. This dominance allowed the party to influence legislative priorities and shape national policy.

The political environment of the time was strongly influenced by growing tensions between the United States and Great Britain. Disputes over maritime rights, trade restrictions, and the impressment of American sailors by the British Royal Navy contributed to increasing public and political pressure for a more assertive response. These issues became central topics of debate in Congress and played a significant role in shaping the legislative agenda.

During this period, members of Congress also focused on matters related to national defense, trade policy, and the protection of American shipping interests. Several Democratic-Republican leaders supported stronger measures against Britain, while some Federalists expressed concern about the economic and military consequences of escalating conflict. These divisions reflected broader regional and political differences within the United States.

The political debates of this era ultimately contributed to the conditions that led to the outbreak of the War of 1812. As tensions intensified, congressional discussions increasingly centered on national sovereignty, security, and the future direction of American foreign policy.

DR_{7}	DR_{6}	DR_{5}	DR_{4}	DR_{3}	DR_{2}	DR_{1}			
DR_{8}	DR_{9}	DR_{10}	DR_{11}	DR_{12}	DR_{13}	DR_{14}	DR_{15}	DR_{16}	DR_{17}
Majority →									DR_{18} Ga. Ran
F_{8} Mass. Ran	DR_{26} Va. Ran	DR_{25} Tenn. Ran	DR_{24} S.C. Retired	DR_{23} R.I. Unknown	DR_{22} N.C. Ran	DR_{21} N.J. Ran	DR_{20} N.H. Ran	DR_{19} Ky. Retired	DR_{18} Ga. Ran
F_{7} Del. Ran	F_{6}	F_{5}	F_{4}	F_{3}	F_{2}	F_{1}			

=== Result of the regular elections ===
DR_{7}	DR_{6}	DR_{5}	DR_{4}	DR_{3}	DR_{2}	DR_{1}			
DR_{8}	DR_{9}	DR_{10}	DR_{11}	DR_{12}	DR_{13}	DR_{14}	DR_{15}	DR_{16}	DR_{17}
Majority →									DR_{18} Ga. Re-elected
V_{1} Mass. F Loss	DR_{26} Va. Re-elected	DR_{25} Tenn. Re-elected	DR_{24} S.C. Hold	DR_{23} R.I. Hold	DR_{22} N.C. Re-elected	DR_{21} N.J. Re-elected	DR_{20} N.H. Re-elected	DR_{19} Ky. Hold	DR_{18} Ga. Re-elected
F_{7} Del. Re-elected	F_{6}	F_{5}	F_{4}	F_{3}	F_{2}	F_{1}			

Key

DR_{#}	Democratic-Republican
F_{#}	Federalist
V_{#}	Vacant

== Race summaries ==
Except if/when noted, number following candidates is whole number votes.

=== Special elections during the 11th Congress ===
In these special elections, the winners were seated during 1810 or before March 4, 1811; ordered by election date.

State	Incumbent			Results	Candidates
State	Senator	Party	Electoral history	Results	Candidates
Kentucky (Class 2)	Buckner Thruston	Democratic- Republican	1804	Incumbent resigned December 18, 1809, to become a judge on the United States Circuit Court of the District of Columbia. New senator elected January 4, 1810. Democratic-Republican hold.	▌ ✓ Henry Clay (Democratic-Republican) 61; ▌William Logan (Democratic-Republican) 31
Delaware (Class 1)	Samuel White	Federalist	1801 (appointed); 1802 (special); 1803; 1809	Incumbent died November 4, 1809. New senator elected January 12, 1810. Federalist hold.	▌ ✓ Outerbridge Horsey (Federalist) 27; Blank 1
New Hampshire (Class 3)	Nahum Parker	Democratic- Republican	1807	Incumbent resigned June 1, 1810. New senator elected June 21, 1810. Federalist gain.	▌ ✓ Charles Cutts (Federalist) (Note: Charles Cutts (NH) has conflicting accounts of whether he was a Democratic-Republican or a Federalist.) 99; ▌Thomas W. Thompson (Federalist) 73; ▌Jedediah K. Smith (Democratic-Republican) 4; ▌Oliver Peabody (Federalist) 2; ▌Isaac Hill (Democratic-Republican) 1; Nay 5
Connecticut (Class 1)	James Hillhouse	Federalist	1796 (special); 1797; 1803; 1809	Incumbent resigned June 10, 1810. New senator elected in June 1810. Federalist hold.	▌ ✓ Samuel W. Dana (Federalist) 137; ▌Asa Spalding (Democratic-Republican) 19
Ohio (Class 1)	Return J. Meigs Jr.	Democratic- Republican	1808 (special); 1808	Incumbent resigned December 8, 1810, to become Governor of Ohio. New senator elected December 15, 1810 on the sixth ballot. Democratic-Republican hold.	▌ ✓ Thomas Worthington (Democratic-Republican) 35; ▌Samuel Huntington (Democratic-Republican) 31; ▌James Pritchard (Democratic-Republican) 2; ▌George Tod (Unknown) Eliminated; ▌John Bigger (Democratic-Republican) Eliminated; ▌Thomas Kirker (Democratic-Republican) Eliminated; ▌Thomas Morris (Democratic-Republican) Eliminated; ▌James Caldwell (Democratic-Republican) Eliminated
South Carolina (Class 2)	Thomas Sumter	Democratic- Republican	1801 (special); 1804	Incumbent resigned December 16, 1810. New senator elected December 18, 1810 on the third ballot. Democratic-Republican hold. Winner also elected to the next term; see below.	▌ ✓ John Taylor (Democratic-Republican) 83; ▌Joseph Alston (Democratic-Republican) 74

=== Races leading to the 12th Congress ===
In these regular elections, the winner was seated on March 4, 1811 (except where noted due to late election); ordered by state.

All of the elections involved the Class 2 seats.

State	Incumbent			Results	Candidates
State	Senator	Party	Electoral history	Results	Candidates
Delaware	James A. Bayard	Federalist	1804 (special); 1805	Incumbent re-elected January 8, 1811.	▌ ✓ James A. Bayard (Federalist) 17; ▌James Tilton (Democratic-Republican) 9
Georgia	William H. Crawford	Democratic- Republican	1807 (special)	Incumbent re-elected in 1810 or 1811.	▌ ✓ William H. Crawford (Democratic-Republican); [data missing]
Kentucky	Henry Clay	Democratic- Republican	1810 (special)	Incumbent retired to run for U.S. House of Representatives. New senator elected January 8, 1811. Democratic-Republican hold.	▌ ✓ George M. Bibb (Democratic-Republican) 77; ▌Christopher Greenup (Democratic-Republican) 20; ▌Matthew Lyon (Democratic-Republican) 0
Massachusetts	Timothy Pickering	Federalist	1803 (special); 1805	Incumbent lost re-election. Legislature failed to elect due to partisan deadlock in the Massachusetts Senate. Federalist loss.	▌Timothy Pickering (Federalist); ▌Joseph B. Varnum (Democratic-Republican); ▌William King (Democratic-Republican); ▌Richard Cutts (Democratic-Republican); ▌Perez Morton (Unknown); ▌Josiah Quincy III (Federalist); ▌Joseph Sprague (Unknown)
New Hampshire	Nicholas Gilman	Democratic- Republican	1804	Incumbent re-elected June 21, 1810, on the fourth ballot.	▌ ✓ Nicholas Gilman (Democratic-Republican); ▌Jedediah K. Smith (Democratic-Republican) 78; ▌Charles Cutts (Democratic-Republican) 1; ▌Oliver Peabody (Federalist) 1; Nay 1
New Jersey	John Condit	Democratic- Republican	1803 (appointed); 1803 (special); 1809 (lost); 1809 (appointed); 1809 (special)	Incumbent re-elected November 1, 1810.	▌ ✓ John Condit (Democratic-Republican); Unopposed
North Carolina	James Turner	Democratic- Republican	1804	Incumbent re-elected November 28, 1810 on the third vote.	▌ ✓ James Turner (Democratic-Republican) 106; ▌David Stone (Democratic-Republican) 83; Blank 1; ▌Benjamin Smith (Democratic-Republican) Eliminated; ▌Thomas Davis (Unknown) Eliminated
Rhode Island	Elisha Mathewson	Democratic- Republican	1807 (special)	Incumbent retired or lost re-election. New senator elected November 2, 1810. Democratic-Republican hold.	▌ ✓ Jeremiah B. Howell (Democratic-Republican) 42; ▌James Burrill Jr. (Federalist) 41
South Carolina	Thomas Sumter	Democratic- Republican	1801 (special); 1809	Incumbent resigned December 16, 1810. New senator elected December 18, 1810 on the third ballot. Democratic-Republican hold. Winner also elected to finish the current term; see above.	▌ ✓ John Taylor (Democratic-Republican) 83; ▌Joseph Alston (Democratic-Republican) 74
Tennessee	Jenkin Whiteside	Democratic- Republican	1809 (special)	Incumbent re-elected early October 28, 1809.	▌ ✓ Jenkin Whiteside (Democratic-Republican) 39; Unopposed
Virginia	William B. Giles	Democratic- Republican	1804 (appointed); 1804 (special); 1804	Incumbent re-elected January 2, 1811.	▌ ✓ William B. Giles (Democratic-Republican) 123; Scattering 15

=== Special elections during the 12th Congress ===
In these special elections, the winners were seated in 1811 after March 4; ordered by election date.

State	Incumbent			Results	Candidates
State	Senator	Party	Electoral history	Results	Candidates
Massachusetts (Class 2)	Vacant			Legislature had failed to elect; see above. New senator elected late June 6, 1811 on the second ballot. Democratic-Republican gain.	▌ ✓ Joseph Varnum (Democratic-Republican) 341; ▌Timothy Pickering (Federalist) 267
Tennessee (Class 2)	Jenkin Whiteside	Democratic- Republican	1809 (special)	Incumbent resigned October 8, 1811. New senator elected October 1, 1811. Democratic-Republican hold.	▌ ✓ George W. Campbell (Democratic-Republican) 38; Unopposed
Rhode Island (Class 1)	Christopher G. Champlin	Federalist	1809 (special)	Incumbent resigned October 12, 1811. New senator elected October 28, 1811. Federalist hold.	▌ ✓ William Hunter (Federalist) Unanimous

== See also ==
- 1810 United States elections
  - 1810–11 United States House of Representatives elections
- 11th United States Congress
- 12th United States Congress
