= 1806–07 United States Senate elections =

- Dates vary by state
- Class 3

11 of the 34 seats in the United States Senate (plus special elections) 18 seats needed for a majority
	Majority party	Minority party
Party	Democratic-Republican	Federalist
Last election	27 seats	7 seats
Seats before	27	7
Seats won	10	1
Seats after	28	6
Seat change	▲1	▼1
Seats up	9	2
- Results: Dem-Republican hold Dem-Republican gain Federalist hold
Majority Party before election
Democratic-Republican
Elected Majority Party
Democratic-Republican

The 1806–07 United States Senate elections were held on various dates in various states. As these U.S. Senate elections were prior to the ratification of the Seventeenth Amendment in 1913, senators were chosen by state legislatures. Senators were elected over a wide range of time throughout 1806 and 1807, and a seat may have been filled months late or remained vacant due to legislative deadlock. In these elections, terms were up for the senators in Class 3.

The Democratic-Republican Party increased its overwhelming control of the Senate by one additional seat. The Federalist Party went into the elections with such a small share of Senate seats (7 out of 34, or 21%) that even if they had won every election, they would still have remained a minority caucus. As it was, however, they lost one of the two seats they were defending and picked up no gains from their opponents.

== Results summary ==
Senate party division, 10th Congress (1807–1809)

- Majority party: Democratic-Republican (28)
- Minority party: Federalist (6)
- Other parties: 0
- Total seats: 34

== Change in composition ==
=== Before the elections ===
DR_{7}	DR_{6}	DR_{5}	DR_{4}	DR_{3}	DR_{2}	DR_{1}			
DR_{8}	DR_{9}	DR_{10}	DR_{11}	DR_{12}	DR_{13}	DR_{14}	DR_{15}	DR_{16}	DR_{17}
Majority →									DR_{18}
DR_{27} Pa. Retired	DR_{26} N.C. Retired	DR_{25} Ohio; Unknown	DR_{24} Vt. Ran	DR_{23} S.C. Ran	DR_{22} N.Y. Ran	DR_{21} Md. Ran	DR_{20} Ky. Ran	DR_{19} Ga. Ran	DR_{18}
F_{7} N.H. Retired	F_{6} Conn. Ran	F_{5}	F_{4}	F_{3}	F_{2}	F_{1}			

=== Beginning of the next Congress ===
DR_{7}	DR_{6}	DR_{5}	DR_{4}	DR_{3}	DR_{2}	DR_{1}			
DR_{8}	DR_{9}	DR_{10}	DR_{11}	DR_{12}	DR_{13}	DR_{14}	DR_{15}	DR_{16}	DR_{17}
Majority →									DR_{18}
DR_{27} Pa. Hold	DR_{26} Ohio; Hold	DR_{25} N.C. Hold	DR_{24} Md. Hold	DR_{23} Ky. Hold	DR_{22} Vt. Re-elected	DR_{21} S.C. Re-elected	DR_{20} N.Y. Re-elected	DR_{19} #Georgia	DR_{18}
DR_{28} N.H. Gain	F_{6} Conn. Re-elected	F_{5}	F_{4}	F_{3}	F_{2}	F_{1}			

Key:

DR_{#}	Democratic-Republican
F_{#}	Federalist
V_{#}	Vacant

== Race summaries ==
Except if/when noted, the number following candidates is the whole number vote(s), not a percentage.

=== Special elections during the preceding Congress ===
In these special elections, the winner was seated during 1806 or before March 4, 1807; ordered by election date.

State	Incumbent			Results	Candidates
State	Senator	Party	Electoral history	Results	Candidates
Georgia (Class 3)	James Jackson	Democratic- Republican	1793; 1795 (resigned); 1800	Incumbent died March 19, 1806. New senator elected June 19, 1806. Democratic-Republican hold.	▌ ✓ John Milledge (Democratic-Republican) 41; ▌[FNU] Barnot (Unknown) 24; ▌[FNU] Telfair (Note: Possibly Thomas Telfair) (Unknown) 13
Kentucky (Class 3)	John Adair	Democratic- Republican	1805 (special)	Incumbent resigned November 18, 1806 after losing re-election; see below. New senator elected November 19, 1806, despite being younger than the constitutional minimum. Democratic-Republican hold.	▌ ✓ Henry Clay (Democratic-Republican) 58; ▌George M. Bibb (Democratic-Republican) 10; ▌John Pope (Federalist) 1
Maryland (Class 3)	Robert Wright	Democratic- Republican	1801 (special)	Incumbent resigned November 12, 1806 to become Governor of Maryland. New senator elected November 25, 1806. Democratic-Republican hold. Winner also elected to the next term; see below.	▌ ✓ Philip Reed (Democratic-Republican) 47; ▌William Hayward (Federalist) 33

=== Races leading to the next Congress ===
In these regular elections, the winner was seated on March 4, 1807; ordered by state.

All the elections involved the Class 3 seats.

State	Incumbent			Results	Candidates
State	Senator	Party	Electoral history	Results	Candidates
Connecticut	Uriah Tracy	Federalist	1796 (special); 1801	Incumbent re-elected in 1807.	▌ ✓ Uriah Tracy (Federalist); [data missing]
Georgia	John Milledge	Democratic- Republican	1806 (special)	Incumbent re-elected in 1806.	▌ ✓ John Milledge (Democratic-Republican); [data missing]
Kentucky	John Adair	Democratic- Republican	1805 (special)	Incumbent lost re-election. New senator elected November 13, 1806 on the fourth ballot. Democratic-Republican hold. Incumbent immediately resigned and a new senator was elected to finish the term; see above.	▌ ✓ John Pope (Democratic-Republican) 45; ▌John Adair (Democratic-Republican) 37; ▌Samuel Hopkins (Democratic-Republican) Eliminated
Maryland	Robert Wright	Democratic- Republican	1801 (special)	Incumbent resigned November 12, 1806 to become Governor of Maryland. New senator elected in 1806 or 1807. Democratic-Republican hold. Winner also elected to finish the current term, see above.	▌ ✓ Philip Reed (Democratic-Republican); [data missing]
New Hampshire	William Plumer	Federalist	1802 (special)	Incumbent retired. New senator elected in 1807. Democratic-Republican gain.	▌ ✓ Nahum Parker (Democratic-Republican); [data missing]
New York	John Smith	Democratic- Republican	1804 (special)	Incumbent re-elected February 3, 1807.	▌ ✓ John Smith (Democratic-Republican) 112; ▌John Jay (Federalist) 14
North Carolina	David Stone	Democratic- Republican	1800	Incumbent retired to return to the State Superior Court, and then resigned early (February 17, 1807). New senator elected in 1806 on the seventh ballot. Democratic-Republican hold.	▌ ✓ Jesse Franklin (Democratic-Republican) 102; ▌Thomas Blount (Democratic-Republican) 56; ▌Benjamin Smith (Democratic-Republican) 9; ▌Thomas Davis (Unknown) Eliminated; ▌John H. Binford (Unknown) Eliminated; ▌David Stone (Democratic-Republican) Eliminated; ▌[FNU] Capoe (Unknown) 1; Blank 1
Ohio	Thomas Worthington	Democratic- Republican	1803	Incumbent retired or lost re-election. New senator elected January 1, 1807. Democratic-Republican hold.	▌ ✓ Edward Tiffin (Democratic-Republican) 25; ▌Philemon Beecher (Federalist) 12; ▌John Bigger (Federalist) 2; ▌Return J. Meigs Jr. (Democratic-Republican) 2; ▌Tom Kinkey (Note: 'more than likely…fictional characters') (Unknown) 1; ▌Tom Tuff (Unknown) 1
Pennsylvania	George Logan	Democratic- Republican	1801 (appointed); 1801 (special)	Incumbent retired. New senator elected in 1806. Democratic-Republican hold.	▌ ✓ Andrew Gregg (Democratic-Republican) 49.11%; ▌Nathaniel Boileau (Democratic-Republican) 35.71%; ▌John Steele (Democratic-Republican) 12.5%; Not voting 2.68%
South Carolina	John Gaillard	Democratic- Republican	1804 (special)	Incumbent re-elected December 9, 1806 on the second ballot.	▌ ✓ John Gaillard (Democratic-Republican) 75; ▌Samuel Farrow (Democratic-Republican) 64; ▌Joseph Blythe Eliminated
Vermont	Stephen R. Bradley	Democratic- Republican	1791; 1795 (lost); 1801 (special)	Incumbent re-elected in 1806.	▌ ✓ Stephen R. Bradley (Democratic-Republican) 120; Others 60

=== Special elections during the next Congress ===
In this special election, the winner was seated in 1807 after March 4; ordered by election date.

State	Incumbent			Results	Candidates
State	Senator	Party	Electoral history	Results	Candidates
Vermont (Class 1)	Israel Smith	Democratic- Republican	1802	Incumbent resigned October 1, 1807. New senator elected October 10, 1807. Democratic-Republican hold.	▌ ✓ Jonathan Robinson (Democratic-Republican); [data missing]
Connecticut (Class 3)	Uriah Tracy	Federalist	1796 (special); 1801; 1807	Incumbent died July 19, 1807. Samuel W. Dana (Federalist) was elected to finish the term, (Note: Dana 96, Asa Spalding (Democratic-Republican) 50, David Humphrey (Federalist) 8) but declined the election. New senator elected October 25, 1807 on the second ballot. Federalist hold.	▌ ✓ Chauncey Goodrich (Federalist) 80; ▌A. Spalding (Democratic-Republican) 74; ▌Roger Griswold (Federalist) 17; ▌D. Humphrey (Federalist) 10; ▌J. C. Smith (Federalist) 2; ▌E. Boardman (Democratic-Republican) 1; ▌J. Davenport (Democratic-Republican) 1
Rhode Island (Class 2)	James Fenner	Democratic- Republican	1804	Incumbent resigned September 1807 to become Governor of Rhode Island. New senator elected October 26, 1807. Democratic-Republican hold.	▌ ✓ Elisha Mathewson (Democratic-Republican) 57; ▌Jonathan Russell (Democratic-Republican) 18; ▌James Burrill Jr. (Federalist) 2
Georgia (Class 2)	George Jones	Democratic- Republican	1807 (appointed)	Predecessor Abraham Baldwin (DR) died March 4, 1807. Incumbent appointee lost re-election. New senator elected November 7, 1807. Democratic-Republican hold.	▌ ✓ William H. Crawford (Democratic-Republican) 59; ▌George Jones (Democratic-Republican) 27

== Georgia ==
=== Georgia (special, class 2) ===
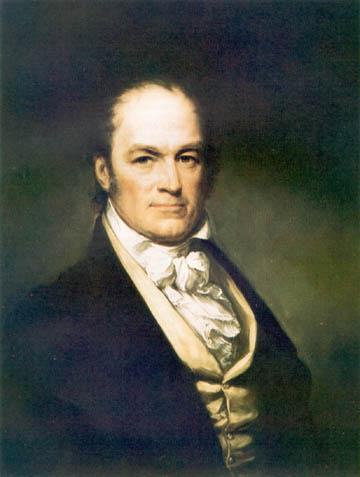
Senator William H. Crawford

Democratic-Republican Abraham Baldwin died March 4, 1807. Democratic-Republican George Jones was appointed August 27. 1807 to continue the term, pending a special election. Jones ran in the November 7, 1807 special election, but lost to Democratic-Republican William H. Crawford.

=== Class 3 ===
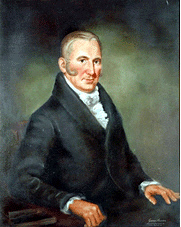
Senator John Milledge

Democratic-Republican James Jackson, who had served since 1793 died March 19, 1806.

==== Georgia (special, class 3) ====
Democratic-Republican John Milledge was elected June 19, 1806.

==== Georgia (regular) ====
Milledge was later re-elected to the next term.

== Maryland ==
1806 United States Senate elections in Maryland
- November 25, 1806

80 members of the Maryland General Assembly
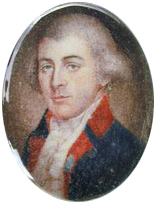
Candidate	Philip Reed	William Hayward
Party	Democratic-Republican
Legislative vote	47	33
Percentage	58.75%	41.25%

The Maryland General Assembly convened to both fill the unexpired term of Robert Wright who resigned to become Governor of Maryland, and to fill the next term. This election was therefore both the regular and special.

Philip Reed won election over William Hayward by a margin of 17.50%, or 33 votes, for the Class 3 seat.

== See also ==
- 1806 United States elections
  - 1806–07 United States House of Representatives elections
- 9th United States Congress
- 10th United States Congress
