= 1804 United States Senate special elections in New York =

In 1804, there were two special elections for the U.S. Senate from New York:

- February 1804 United States Senate special elections in New York
- November 1804 United States Senate special election in New York
