= 1808–09 United States Senate elections =

- Dates vary by state
- Class 1

12 of the 34 seats in the United States Senate (plus special elections) 18 seats needed for a majority
| | Majority party | Minority party |
|---|---|---|
| Party | Democratic-Republican | Federalist |
| Last election | 27 seats | 7 seats |
| Seats before | 28 | 6 |
| Seats won | 8 | 4 |
| Seats after | 27 | 7 |
| Seat change | ▼1 | ▲1 |
| Seats up | 9 | 3 |
- Results: Federalist hold Federalist gain Dem-Republican hold
Majority Party before election
Democratic-Republican
Elected Majority Party
Democratic-Republican

The 1808–09 United States Senate elections were held on various dates in various states, coinciding with the 1808 presidential election. As these U.S. Senate elections were prior to the ratification of the Seventeenth Amendment in 1913, senators were chosen by state legislatures. Senators were elected over a wide range of time throughout 1808 and 1809, and a seat may have been filled months late or remained vacant due to legislative deadlock. In these elections, terms were up for the senators in Class 1.

The Federalist Party gained one seat in these elections. The Federalists had gone into the elections with such a small share of Senate seats (6 out of 34, or 18%) that even if they had won every election, they would have still remained a minority caucus in the Senate chamber.

In Massachusetts, an early election was called in after incumbent Senator and future President John Quincy Adams broke with his party on the Embargo Act of 1807. John Quincy Adams lost his seat to State Senator James Lloyd.

== Results summary ==
Senate party division, 11th Congress (1809–1811)

- Majority party: Democratic-Republican (26)
- Minority party: Federalist (7–8)
- Other parties: 0
- Total seats: 34

== Change in composition ==
=== Before the regular elections ===
| DR_{7} | DR_{6} | DR_{5} | DR_{4} | DR_{3} | DR_{2} | DR_{1} | | | |
| DR_{8} | DR_{9} | DR_{10} | DR_{11} | DR_{12} | DR_{13} | DR_{14} | DR_{15} | DR_{16} | DR_{17} |
| Majority → | | | | | | | | | DR_{18} |
| DR_{27} Pa. Retired | DR_{26} R.I. Unknown | DR_{25} Vt. Ran | DR_{24} Tenn. Ran | DR_{23} Ohio; Ran | DR_{22} N.Y. Ran | DR_{21} N.J. Ran | DR_{20} Md. Ran | DR_{19} | DR_{18} |
| DR_{28} Va. Retired | F_{6} Md. Ran | F_{5} Del. Ran | F_{4} Conn. Ran | F_{3} | F_{2} | F_{1} | | | |

=== Result of the regular elections ===
| DR_{7} | DR_{6} | DR_{5} | DR_{4} | DR_{3} | DR_{2} | DR_{1} | | | |
| DR_{8} | DR_{9} | DR_{10} | DR_{11} | DR_{12} | DR_{13} | DR_{14} | DR_{15} | DR_{16} | DR_{17} |
| Majority → | | | | | | | | | DR_{18} |
| V_{1} Tenn. D Loss | DR_{26} Va. Hold | DR_{25} Pa. Hold | DR_{24} N.Y. Hold | DR_{23} N.J. Re-elected | DR_{22} Vt. Re-elected | DR_{21} Ohio; Re-elected | DR_{20} Md. Re-elected | DR_{19} | DR_{18} |
| F_{7} R.I. Gain | F_{6} Md. Hold | F_{5} Del. Re-elected | F_{4} Conn. Re-elected | F_{3} | F_{2} | F_{1} | | | |

Key:

| DR_{#} | Democratic-Republican |
| F_{#} | Federalist |
| V_{#} | Vacant |

== Race summaries ==
Except if/when noted, the number following candidates is the whole number vote(s), not a percentage.

=== Special elections during the preceding Congress ===
In these special elections, the winner was elected during 1808 or before March 4, 1809; ordered by election date.

| State | Incumbent | | | Results | Candidates |
| State | Senator | Party | Electoral history | Results | Candidates |
|---|---|---|---|---|---|
| Massachusetts (Class 1) | John Quincy Adams | Federalist | 1803 | Incumbent resigned June 8, 1808, having broken with his party and lost re-election to the next term. New senator elected June 9, 1808 having already won election to the next term; see below. Federalist hold. | ▌ ✓ James Lloyd (Federalist) 179; ▌William Gray (Democratic-Republican) 127 |
| Ohio (Class 1) | John Smith | Democratic- Republican | 1803 | Incumbent resigned April 25, 1808, despite surviving an expulsion trial in the Senate. New senator elected December 10, 1808. Democratic-Republican hold. Successor was also elected to the next term; see below. | ▌ ✓ Return Meigs (Democratic-Republican) 43; ▌Nathaniel Massie (Democratic-Republican) 22; ▌Alexander Campbell (Democratic-Republican) 3; ▌James Pritchard (Democratic-Republican) 2 |
| Pennsylvania (Class 1) | Samuel Maclay | Democratic- Republican | 1802 | Incumbent resigned before the December 1808 general election (effective January 4, 1809), believing he would lose re-election. New senator elected January 9, 1809. Democratic-Republican hold. Winner was also elected to the next term; see below. | ▌ ✓ Michael Leib (Democratic-Republican) 89; ▌George Latimer (Federalist) 12; ▌Joseph Hemphill (Federalist) 11; ▌William Jones (Democratic-Republican) 4; ▌John D. Coxe (Unknown) 4 |

=== Races leading to the next Congress ===
In these regular elections, the winner was seated on March 4, 1809; ordered by state.

All of the elections involved the Class 1 seats.

| State | Incumbent | | | Results | Candidates |
| State | Senator | Party | Electoral history | Results | Candidates |
|---|---|---|---|---|---|
| Connecticut | James Hillhouse | Federalist | 1796; 1797; 1803 | Incumbent re-elected in 1809. | ▌ ✓ James Hillhouse (Federalist); [data missing] |
| Delaware | Samuel White | Federalist | 1801 (appointed); 1803 | Incumbent re-elected January 11, 1809. | ▌ ✓ Samuel White (Federalist) 17; ▌Andrew Gray (Democratic-Republican) 10 |
| Maryland | Samuel Smith | Democratic- Republican | 1802 | Incumbent re-elected November 14, 1809. | ▌ ✓ Samuel Smith (Democratic-Republican) 53; ▌John Eager Howard (Federalist) 29; ▌John Thomson Mason (Federalist) 1; ▌John H. Nicholson (Federalist) 1; ▌Benjamin Stoddert (Federalist) 1; ▌Blank (Federalist) 2 |
| Massachusetts | John Quincy Adams | Federalist | 1803 | Incumbent lost re-election as a Democratic-Republican. New senator elected June 2, 1808. Federalist hold. Incumbent resigned and winner was elected to finish the current term. | ▌ ✓ James Lloyd (Federalist) 248; ▌John Quincy Adams (Democratic-Republican) 213; ▌Laban Wheaton (Federalist) 1 |
| New Jersey | John Condit | Democratic- Republican | 1803 (appointed); 1803 (special) | Incumbent lost renomination. New senator elected November 3, 1808 on the second ballot. Democratic-Republican hold. | ▌ ✓ John Lambert (Democratic-Republican) 27; ▌John Doughty (Unknown) 23; ▌Ebenezer Elmer (Democratic-Republican) 3; ▌John Condit (Democratic-Republican) Eliminated; ▌George C. Maxwell (Democratic-Republican) Eliminated; ▌Henry Southard (Democratic-Republican) Eliminated; ▌William McCullough (Unknown) Eliminated |
| New York | Samuel L. Mitchill | Democratic- Republican | 1804 (special) | Incumbent lost re-election. New senator elected February 7, 1809. Democratic-Republican hold. | ▌ ✓ Obadiah German (Democratic-Republican) 52.4%; ▌David Brooks (Federalist) 34.7%; ▌Samuel L. Mitchill (Democratic-Republican) 12.9% |
| Ohio | Return Meigs | Democratic- Republican | 1808 (special) | Incumbent elected December 10, 1808. | ▌ ✓ Return Meigs (Democratic-Republican) 49; ▌Alexander Campbell (Democratic-Republican) 17; ▌James Pritchard (Democratic-Republican) 4 |
| Pennsylvania | Samuel Maclay | Democratic- Republican | 1808 (special) | Incumbent retired. New senator elected December 13, 1808 and subsequently elected to finish the remaining term. Democratic-Republican hold. | ▌ ✓ Michael Leib (Democratic-Republican) 90; ▌Joseph Hemphill (Federalist) 24; ▌John D. Coxe (Constitutional) 11; ▌Not voting 1 |
| Rhode Island | Benjamin Howland | Democratic- Republican | 1804 (special) | Unknown if incumbent retired or lost re-election. New senator elected November 5, 1808. Federalist gain. | ▌ ✓ Francis Malbone (Federalist); ▌Nathaniel Hazard (Democratic-Republican); "by a majority of six" |
| Tennessee | Joseph Anderson | Democratic- Republican | 1797 (special); 1799 (resigned); 1799 (special); 1803 | Legislature failed to elect. Democratic-Republican loss. Incumbent was appointed to begin the term and was later elected to finish the term. | Election was late; see above |
| Vermont | Jonathan Robinson | Democratic- Republican | 1807 (special) | Incumbent re-elected in 1808. | ▌ ✓ Jonathan Robinson (Democratic-Republican) 109; ▌Daniel Chipman (Federalist) 97; Scattering 3 |
| Virginia | Andrew Moore | Democratic- Republican | 1804 (appointed); 1804 (resigned); 1804 (special) | Incumbent retired. New senator elected in 1809. Democratic-Republican hold. | ▌ ✓ Richard Brent (Democratic-Republican); Unopposed |

=== Special elections during the next Congress ===
In this special election, the winner was elected in 1809 after March 4; ordered by election date.

| State | Incumbent | | | Results | Candidates |
| State | Senator | Party | Electoral history | Results | Candidates |
|---|---|---|---|---|---|
| Tennessee (Class 1) | Joseph Anderson | Democratic- Republican | 1797 (special); 1799 (resigned); 1799 (special); 1803; 1809 (appointed) | Interim appointee elected April 11, 1809. | ▌ ✓ Joseph Anderson (Democratic-Republican) 23; ▌John Sevier (Democratic-Republican) 16 |
| Tennessee (Class 2) | Daniel Smith | Democratic- Republican | 1798 (special); 1799 (resigned); 1803 | Incumbent resigned March 31, 1809. New senator elected April 11, 1809. Democratic-Republican hold. Winner was later re-elected early to the following Congress; see below. | ▌ ✓ Jenkin Whiteside (Democratic-Republican) 22; ▌James Winchester 16; ▌John Sevier (Democratic-Republican) 1 |
| Rhode Island (Class 1) | Francis Malbone | Federalist | 1808 | Incumbent died June 4, 1809. New senator elected June 26, 1809. Federalist hold. | ▌ ✓ Christopher G. Champlin (Federalist) Unanimous |
| Ohio (Class 3) | Stanley Griswold | Democratic- Republican | 1809 (appointed) | Incumbent appointee retired. New senator elected December 12, 1809. Democratic-Republican hold. | ▌ ✓ Alexander Campbell (Democratic-Republican); ▌Richard S. Thompson (Unknown) 29; ▌James Pritchard (Democratic-Republican); ▌Thomas Worthington (Democratic-Republican) 1; ▌David Findlay (Unknown) 1 |
| Georgia (Class 3) | John Milledge | Democratic- Republican | 1806 (special); 1806 | Incumbent resigned November 14, 1809. New senator elected November 27, 1809 on the third ballot. Democratic-Republican hold. | ▌ ✓ Charles Tait (Democratic-Republican) 40; ▌Elijah Clarke (Unknown) 32; ▌Thomas Flournoy (Unknown) 31 |
| New Jersey (Class 2) | John Condit | Democratic- Republican | 1803 (appointed); 1803 (special); 1809 (lost); 1809 (appointed) | Interim appointee elected November 2, 1809. | ▌ ✓ John Condit (Democratic-Republican) Unanimous |

=== Early race leading to the Congress-after-next ===
In this regular election, the winner was seated on March 4, 1811; ordered by state.

This election involved a Class 2 seat.

| State | Incumbent | | | Results | Candidates |
| State | Senator | Party | Electoral history | Results | Candidates |
|---|---|---|---|---|---|
| Tennessee | Jenkin Whiteside | Democratic- Republican | 1809 (special) | Incumbent re-elected early October 28, 1809. | ▌ ✓ Jenkin Whiteside (Democratic-Republican) 39; Unopposed |

== Maryland ==
1808 United States Senate special election in Maryland
- November 1808

80 members of the Maryland General Assembly
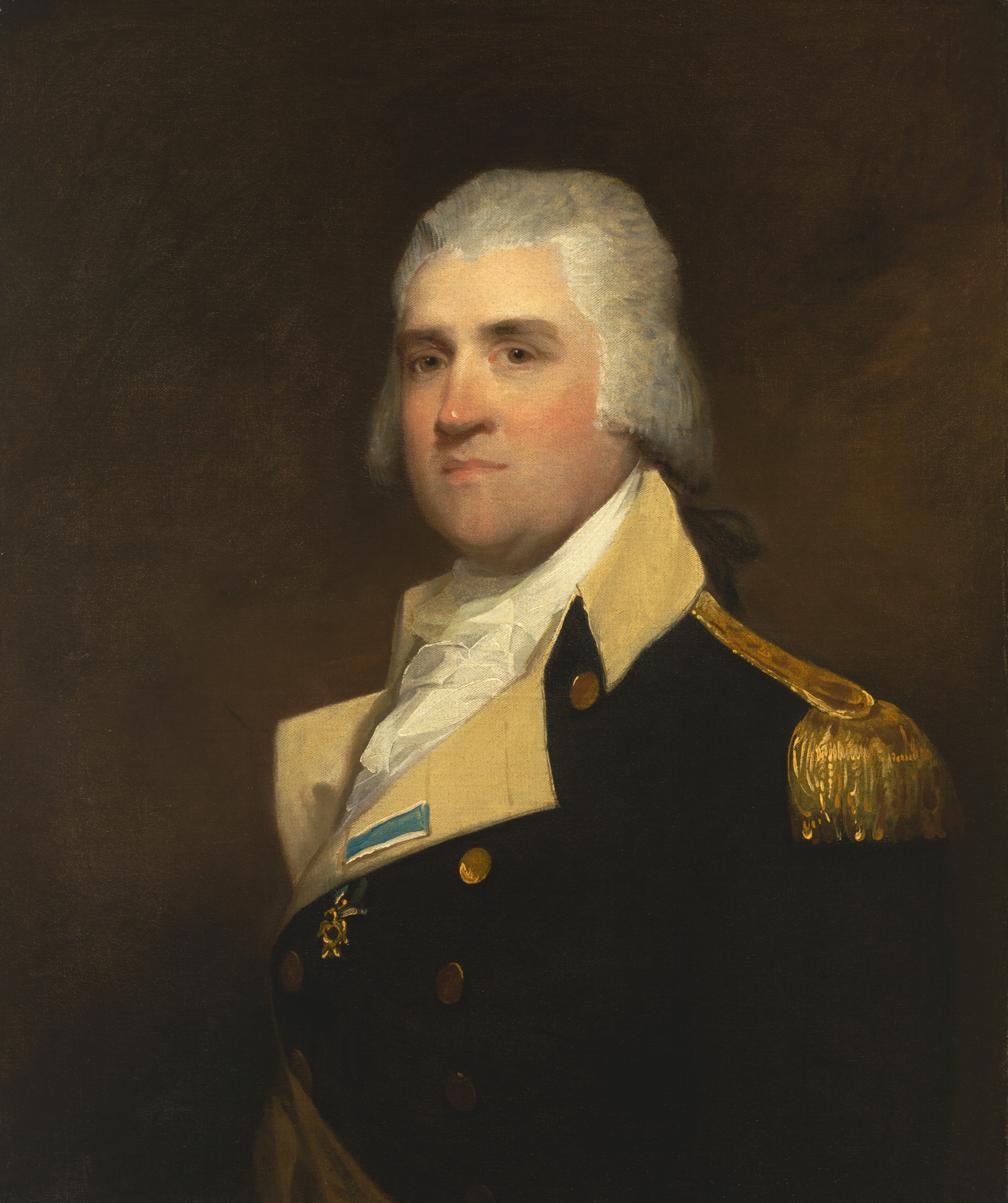

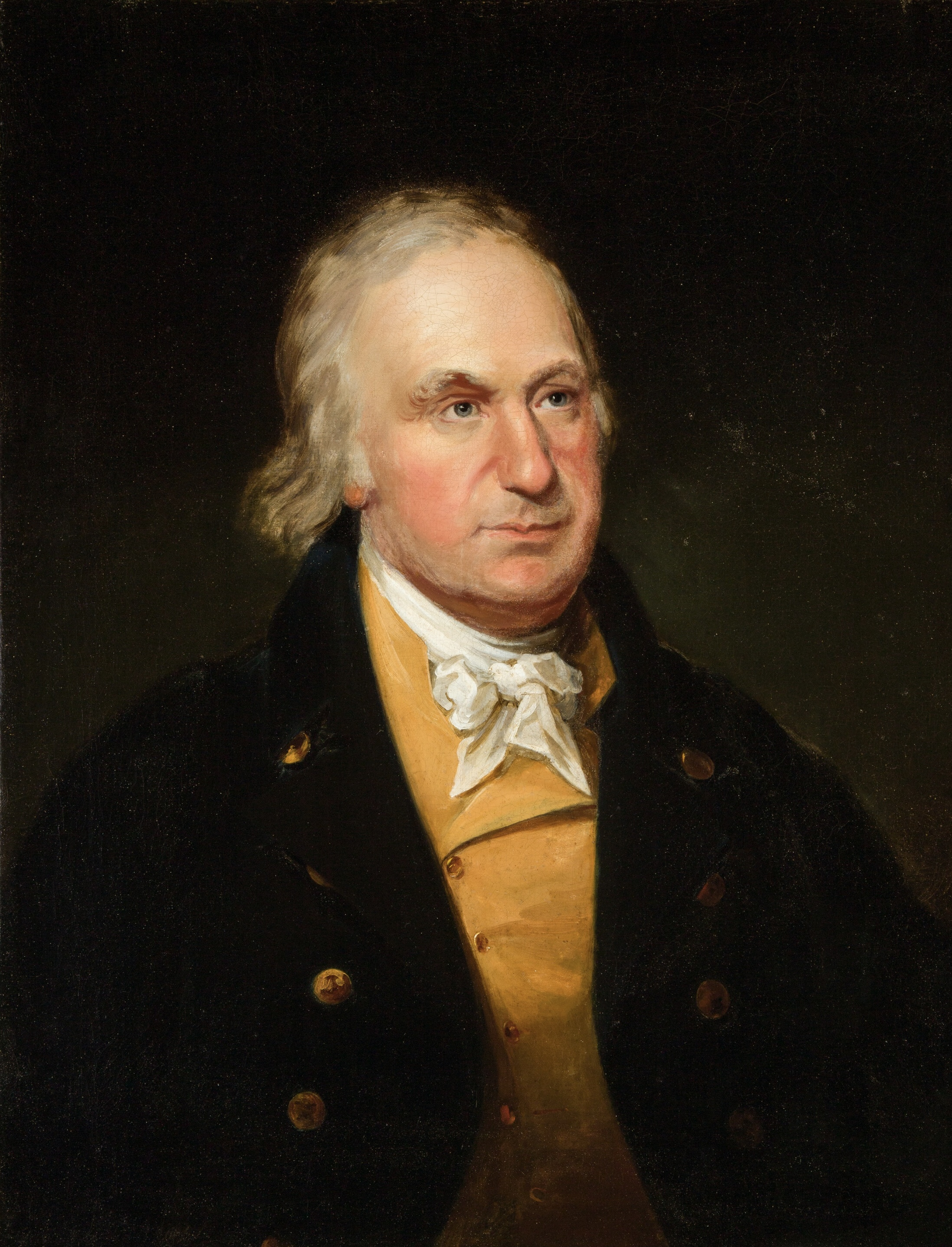
| Candidate | Samuel Smith | John Eager Howard |
| Party | Democratic-Republican | Federalist |
| Legislative vote | 53 | 29 |
| Percentage | 60.92% | 33.33% |

Samuel Smith was appointed to the seat as opposed to a re-election, due to the State House and State Senate unable to come to an agreement on how to elect a Senator.

Samuel Smith then won re-election over John Eager Howard by a margin of 27.59%, or 24 votes, for the Class 1 seat.

== Massachusetts ==
=== Massachusetts (regular) ===
June 1808 Senate election
| Party | Candidate | Votes | % |
|---|---|---|---|
| Federalist | James Lloyd Jr. | 248 | 53.68% |
| Federalist | John Quincy Adams | 213 | 46.10% |
| Federalist | Laban Wheaton | 1 | 0.22% |
| Total votes | | 462 | 100.00% |

== Tennessee ==
=== Class 1 ===
Joseph Anderson, a Democratic-Republican, held a prominent position in Class 1 of the United States Senate, serving intermittently in both the mentioned Senate seat and the other throughout a substantial period, commencing in 1797. His presence in the Senate reflected his notable political influence and the confidence reposed in him by the electorate. Anderson's periodic service underscored the dynamic nature of early American politics, where individuals frequently transitioned between public service and other pursuits. His extended tenure afforded him the opportunity to contribute to various legislative discussions and debates, leaving a lasting impact on the political landscape during a pivotal era in the nation's history.

==== Tennessee (regular, class 1) ====
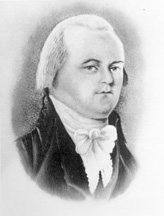
Senator Joseph Anderson

The Tennessee state legislature encountered a challenge in electing a new senator, resulting in a temporary vacancy in the representation. The seat faced the prospect of becoming officially vacant at the commencement of the term on March 4, 1809. However, in response to the legislative deadlock, the Governor of Tennessee, Willie Blount, took a proactive step and appointed Joseph Anderson to initiate the term on an interim basis. This appointment served as a temporary measure, bridging the gap until a special election could be conducted to fill the senatorial position in accordance with the democratic process.

==== Tennessee (special, class 1) ====
Joseph Anderson secured election on April 11, 1809, thereby formalizing his position to complete the senatorial term. This electoral outcome marked the resolution of the previous legislative challenges, as Anderson garnered the necessary support to officially fill the Senate seat.

=== Class 2 ===
Democratic-Republican Daniel Smith entered the political arena with his initial election in 1803, marking the commencement of his service in public office. His affiliation with the Democratic-Republican party underlines the prevailing political dynamics of the time, as the United States navigated through the early years of the 19th century.

==== Tennessee (special, class 2) ====
Smith resigned March 31, 1809.

Democratic-Republican Jenkin Whiteside was elected April 11, 1809 to finish Smith's term, which would end 1809.

==== Tennessee (regular, class 2) ====
Whiteside was re-elected early October 28, 1809, unopposed.

== See also ==
- 1808 United States elections
  - 1808 United States presidential election
  - 1808–09 United States House of Representatives elections
- 10th United States Congress
- 11th United States Congress
