= 1804–05 United States Senate elections =

- Dates vary by state
- Class 2

11 of the 34 seats in the United States Senate (plus special elections) 18 seats needed for a majority
	Majority party	Minority party
Party	Democratic-Republican	Federalist
Last election	22 seats	9 seats
Seats before	25	9
Seats won	9	2
Seats after	27	7
Seat change	▲2	▼2
Seats up	7	4
- Results: Dem-Republican hold Dem-Republican gain Federalist hold
Majority Party before election
Democratic-Republican
Elected Majority Party
Democratic-Republican

The 1804–05 United States Senate elections were held on various dates in various states. As these U.S. Senate elections were prior to the ratification of the Seventeenth Amendment in 1913, senators were chosen by state legislatures. Senators were elected over a wide range of time throughout 1804 and 1805, and a seat may have been filled months late or remained vacant due to legislative deadlock. In these elections, terms were up for the senators in Class 2.

These elections expanded the Democratic-Republican Party's overwhelming control over the Senate. The Federalist Party went into the elections with such a small share of Senate seats (9 out of 34, or 27%) that even if they had won every election, they would have still remained a minority caucus.

== Results summary ==
Senate party division, 9th Congress (1805–1807)

- Majority party: Democratic-Republican (27)
- Minority party: Federalist (7)
- Other parties: 0
- Total seats: 34

== Change in composition ==
Only reflects results of regular elections.

=== Before the regular elections ===
DR_{7}	DR_{6}	DR_{5}	DR_{4}	DR_{3}	DR_{2}	DR_{1}			
DR_{8}	DR_{9}	DR_{10}	DR_{11}	DR_{12}	DR_{13}	DR_{14}	DR_{15}	DR_{16}	DR_{17}
Majority →									DR_{18}
F_{8} N.J. Ran	F_{9} N.H. Unknown	DR_{25} Tenn. Retired	DR_{24} Va. Ran	DR_{23} S.C. Ran	DR_{22} R.I. Ran	DR_{21} N.C. Ran	DR_{20} Ky. Ran	DR_{19} Ga. Ran	DR_{18}
F_{7} Mass. Ran	F_{6} Del. Ran	F_{5}	F_{4}	F_{3}	F_{2}	F_{1}			

=== Result of the regular elections ===
DR_{7}	DR_{6}	DR_{5}	DR_{4}	DR_{3}	DR_{2}	DR_{1}			
DR_{8}	DR_{9}	DR_{10}	DR_{11}	DR_{12}	DR_{13}	DR_{14}	DR_{15}	DR_{16}	DR_{17}
Majority →									DR_{18}
DR_{27} N.J. Gain	DR_{26} N.H. Gain	DR_{25} Tenn. Hold	DR_{24} R.I. Hold	DR_{23} N.C. Hold	DR_{22} Ky. Hold	DR_{21} Va. Re-elected	DR_{20} S.C. Re-elected	DR_{19} Ga. Re-elected	DR_{18}
F_{7} Mass. Re-elected	F_{6} Del. Re-elected	F_{5}	F_{4}	F_{3}	F_{2}	F_{1}			

Key:

DR_{#}	Democratic-Republican
F_{#}	Federalist
V_{#}	Vacant

== Race summaries ==
Except if/when noted, the number following candidates is the whole number vote(s), not a percentage.

=== Special elections during the 8th Congress ===
In these special elections, the winner was seated during 1804 or before March 4, 1805; ordered by election date.

State	Incumbent			Results	Candidates
State	Senator	Party	Electoral history	Results	Candidates
New York (Class 3)	John Armstrong Jr.	Democratic- Republican	1800 (special); 1801; 1802 (resigned); 1803 (appointed)	Interim appointee resigned December 3, 1804, to become U.S. Senator from Class 1 seat. New senator elected February 3, 1804. Democratic-Republican hold.	▌ ✓ John Smith (Democratic-Republican) 121; Unopposed
New York (Class 1)	Theodorus Bailey	Democratic- Republican	1803	Incumbent resigned January 16, 1804, to become Postmaster of New York City. New senator elected February 3, 1804. Democratic-Republican hold.	▌ ✓ John Armstrong Jr. (Democratic-Republican) 85; ▌Jacob Radcliff (Federalist) 4; ▌Egbert Benson (Federalist) 3
Rhode Island (Class 1)	Samuel J. Potter	Democratic- Republican	1802	Incumbent died October 14, 1804. New senator elected October 29, 1804. Democratic-Republican hold.	▌ ✓ Benjamin Howland (Democratic-Republican); ▌Asher Robins (Democratic-Republican); "by a majority of 2"
New York (Class 1)	John Armstrong Jr.	Democratic- Republican	1804 (special)	Incumbent resigned to become U.S. Minister to France. New senator elected November 9, 1804. Democratic-Republican hold.	▌ ✓ Samuel L. Mitchill (Democratic-Republican) 83.3%; ▌Rufus King (Federalist) 15.6%; ▌David Thomas (Democratic-Republican) 1.1%
Delaware (Class 2)	William H. Wells	Federalist	1799 (special); 1799	Incumbent resigned November 6, 1804. New senator elected November 13, 1804. Winner also elected to the next term; see below. Federalist hold.	▌ ✓ James A. Bayard (Federalist) 15; Unopposed
Virginia (Class 1)	Andrew Moore	Democratic- Republican	1804 (appointed)	Interim appointee resigned December 3, 1804, to become U.S. Senator from Class 1 seat. New senator elected December 4, 1804. Democratic-Republican hold.	▌ ✓ William B. Giles (Democratic-Republican); [data missing]
Virginia (Class 2)	William B. Giles	Democratic- Republican	1804 (appointed)	Interim appointee resigned December 3, 1804, to become U.S. Senator from Class 2 seat. New senator elected December 4, 1804. Winner also elected to the next term; see below. Democratic-Republican hold.	▌ ✓ Andrew Moore (Democratic-Republican); [data missing]
South Carolina (Class 3)	Pierce Butler	Democratic- Republican	1802 (special)	Resigned November 21, 1804. New senator elected December 6, 1804. Democratic-Republican hold.	▌ ✓ John Gaillard (Democratic-Republican); [data missing]

=== Races leading to the 9th Congress ===
In these regular elections, the winner was seated on March 4, 1805; ordered by state.

All of the elections involved the Class 2 seats.

State	Incumbent			Results	Candidates
State	Senator	Party	Electoral history	Results	Candidates
Delaware	James A. Bayard	Federalist	1804 (special)	Incumbent re-elected January 24, 1805.	▌ ✓ James A. Bayard (Federalist) 15; ▌Caesar A. Rodney (Democratic-Republican) 9; ▌James Sykes (Federalist) 1
Georgia	Abraham Baldwin	Democratic- Republican	1799	Incumbent re-elected November 14, 1804.	▌ ✓ Abraham Baldwin (Democratic-Republican); Unanimous
Kentucky	John Brown	Democratic- Republican	1792 (new state); 1792; 1798	Incumbent lost re-election. New senator elected in 1804 on the seventh ballot. Democratic-Republican hold.	▌ ✓ Buckner Thruston (Democratic-Republican) 44; ▌John Adair (Democratic-Republican) 43; ▌John Brown (Democratic-Republican) Eliminated
Massachusetts	Timothy Pickering	Federalist	1803 (special)	Incumbent re-elected February 6, 1805, on the third ballot.	▌ ✓ Timothy Pickering (Federalist) 102; ▌William Eustis (Democratic-Republican) 99
New Hampshire	Simeon Olcott	Federalist	1801 (special)	Incumbent retired or lost re-election. New senator elected November 28, 1804. Democratic-Republican gain.	▌ ✓ Nicholas Gilman (Democratic-Republican) 85; ▌Timothy Farrar (Federalist) 70
New Jersey	Jonathan Dayton	Federalist	1798	Incumbent lost re-election. New senator elected in 1804. Democratic-Republican gain.	▌ ✓ Aaron Kitchell (Democratic-Republican) 36; ▌Jonathan Dayton (Federalist)
North Carolina	Jesse Franklin	Democratic- Republican	1798	Incumbent lost re-election. New senator elected in 1804 on the fifth ballot. Democratic-Republican hold. Winner would later reject his election and never take the seat. A new election was held the next year; see below.	▌ ✓ Montfort Stokes (Democratic-Republican); ▌Jesse Franklin (Democratic-Republican); ▌Benjamin Smith (Democratic-Republican); ▌Thomas Blount (Democratic-Republican) Eliminated; ▌Stephen Cabarrus (Unknown) Eliminated
Rhode Island	Christopher Ellery	Democratic- Republican	1801 (special)	Incumbent lost re-election. New senator elected in 1804. Democratic-Republican hold.	▌ ✓ James Fenner (Democratic-Republican); ▌Christopher Ellery (Democratic-Republican); "by a majority of 16"
South Carolina	Thomas Sumter	Democratic- Republican	1801	Incumbent elected December 6, 1804.	▌ ✓ Thomas Sumter (Democratic-Republican) 101; ▌Henry Middleton (Democratic-Republican) 21; ▌William Hill (Unknown) 4; ▌Joseph Blyth (Unknown) 2; ▌R. Anderson (Unknown) 1; ▌Pierce Butler (Independent) 1; ▌Samuel Farrow (Democratic-Republican) 1; ▌John Gaillard (Democratic-Republican) 1; ▌Elias Horry (Unknown) 1; ▌John Ward (Unknown) 1; "Lost" 1
Tennessee	William Cocke	Democratic- Republican	1799 (special)	Incumbent retired. New senator elected early September 23, 1803. Democratic-Republican hold.	▌ ✓ Daniel Smith (Democratic-Republican) 35; ▌Jenkin Whiteside (Democratic-Republican) 1
Virginia	William B. Giles	Democratic- Republican	1804 (appointed); 1804 (resigned); 1804 (special)	Incumbent re-elected December 7, 1804.	▌ ✓ William B. Giles (Democratic-Republican); [data missing]

=== Special elections during the 9th Congress ===
In this special election, the winner was seated in 1805 after March 4.

State	Incumbent			Results	Candidates
State	Senator	Party	Electoral history	Results	Candidates
Kentucky (Class 3)	John Breckinridge	Democratic- Republican	1800	Resigned August 7, 1805, to become U.S. Attorney General. New senator elected November 8, 1805. Democratic-Republican hold.	▌ ✓ John Adair (Democratic-Republican) 45; ▌John Pope (Democratic-Republican) 35
North Carolina (Class 2)	Vacant			Montfort Stokes (DR) had been elected in 1804 (see above) but rejected the position. New senator elected November 22, 1805. Democratic-Republican gain.	▌ ✓ James Turner (Democratic-Republican) 122; ▌Thomas Davis (Federalist) 51; ▌Stephen Cabarrus (Unknown) 1; Blank 1

== Delaware ==
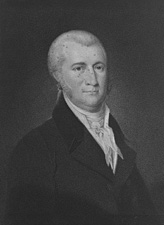
Senator James A. Bayard

There were two elections this cycle to the same seat, because Federalist William H. Wells, who had first been elected in 1799, resigned November 6, 1804.

=== Delaware (regular) ===
Federalist James A. Bayard was elected November 13, 1804, to finish the term ending the following March.

=== Delaware (special) ===
Federalist James A. Bayard also elected in 1805, to the next term.

== New York (special) ==
In February 1804 two senators were elected to finish vacant terms. The winner of the class 1 seat later resigned, leading to a November special election.

Theodorus Bailey had been elected to the Class 1 seat (term 1803–1809) but resigned on January 16, 1804, after his appointment as Postmaster of New York City.

John Armstrong had been re-elected to the class 3 seat to the term that would end March 3, 1807. He resigned February 5, 1802, and DeWitt Clinton was elected February 9, 1802 to finish the term.

Clinton then resigned on November 4, 1803, after his appointment as Mayor of New York City, and Governor George Clinton appointed Armstrong to his old seat to continue the term temporarily until another special election.

Armstrong was then elected to the class 1 seat and so resigned from the class 3 seat.

=== New York (February: special, classes 1 and 3) ===
The first special election was held February 3, 1804, by the New York State Legislature to elect both senators. The class 1 term ended March 3, 1809, and the class 3 term ended March 3, 1813.

U.S. Senator (Class 1) Incumbent: Theodorus Bailey

House	Democratic-Republican		Federalist		Federalist	
State Senate (32 members)	✓ John Armstrong					
State Assembly (99 members)	✓ John Armstrong	83	Jacob Radcliff	4	Egbert Benson	3

U.S. Senator (Class 3) Incumbent: John Armstrong

House	Democratic-Republican	Federalist	Federalist
State Senate (32 members)	✓ John Smith		
State Assembly (99 members)	✓ John Smith	Smith was nominated unanimously by the Assembly, but the exact number of votes given is unclear.	

John Smith was seated February 23, 1804. John Armstrong was seated February 25, 1804.

=== New York (November: special, class 1) ===
Once again, John Armstrong resigned from the Senate on June 30, 1804 (a third time in three years) when appointed U.S. Minister to France. To fill the vacancy, the legislature held a special election November 9, 1804, and elected Samuel L. Mitchill.

House	Democratic-Republican		Federalist		Democratic-Republican	
State Senate (30 members)	✓ Samuel L. Mitchill					
State Assembly (100 members)	✓ Samuel L. Mitchill	75	Rufus King	14	David Thomas	1

Mitchill was seated November 23, 1804.

== Rhode Island ==
=== Rhode Island (regular) ===
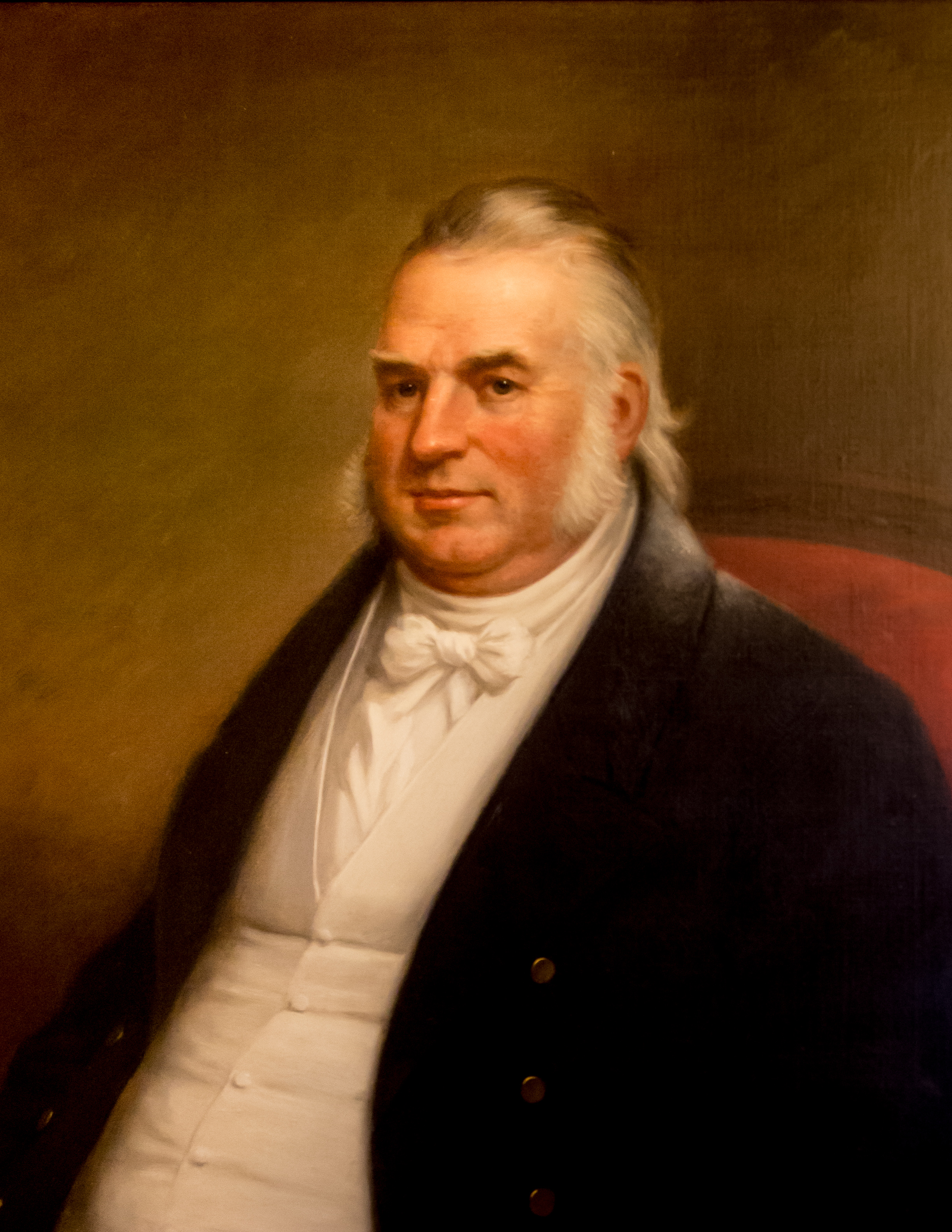
Senator James Fenner

Democratic-Republican James Fenner beat incumbent Democratic-Republican Christopher Ellery in 1804.

=== Rhode Island (special) ===
Democratic-Republican Samuel J. Potter died October 14, 1804, Democratic-Republican Benjamin Howland was elected October 29, 1804, to finish the term.

== South Carolina ==
=== South Carolina (regular) ===
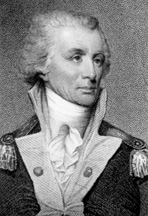
Senator Thomas Sumter

Democratic-Republican Thomas Sumter was re-elected December 6, 1804.

=== South Carolina (special) ===
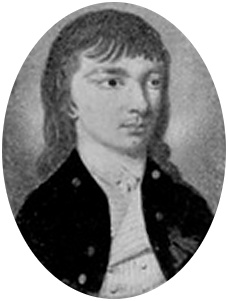
Senator John Gaillard

Democratic-Republican Pierce Butler resigned November 21, 1804, and Democratic-Republican John Gaillard was elected December 6, 1804.

== Virginia ==
The incumbent senators effectively switched seats due to appointments and special elections.

=== Class 2 ===
Virginia's class 2 senators

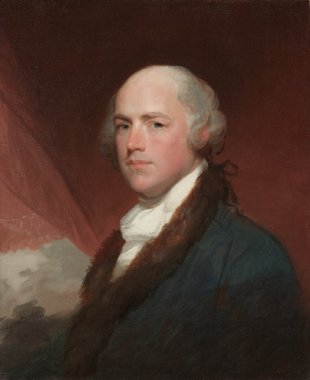
Wilson C. Nicholas,
until May 22, 1804

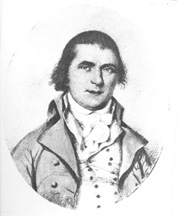
Andrew Moore,
August 11, 1804 – December 3, 1804

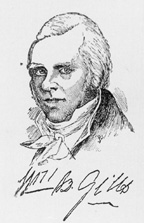
William B. Giles,
from December 4, 1804

==== Virginia (special, class 2) ====
Democratic-Republican Wilson C. Nicholas resigned May 22, 1804, and Democratic-Republican Andrew Moore was appointed August 11, 1804, to continue the term. Moore was elected to the other seat, so he resigned and Democratic-Republican William B. Giles, who had already been elected to this seat's next term, was elected December 4, 1804, to finish the term.

==== Virginia (regular, class 2) ====
Democratic-Republican William B. Giles was elected December 4, 1804, to the next term.

=== Virginia (special, class 1) ===
Virginia's class 1 senators

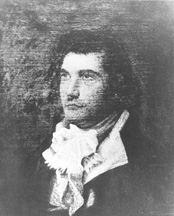
Abraham B. Venable,
until June 7, 1804

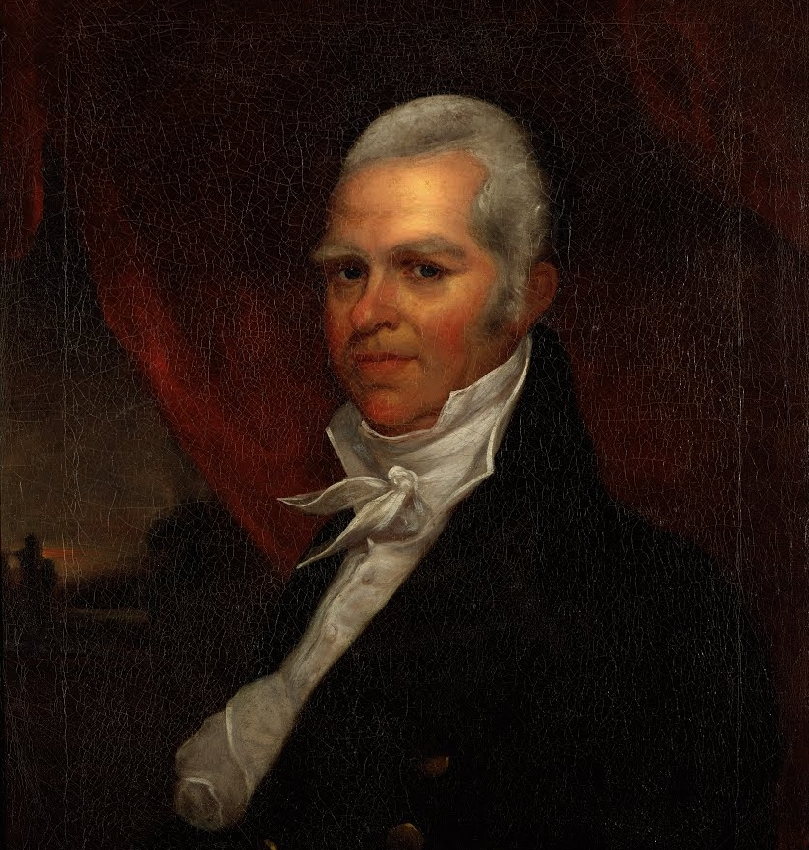
William B. Giles,
August 11, 1804 – December 3, 1804

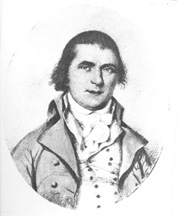
Andrew Moore,
from December 4, 1804

Democratic-Republican Abraham B. Venable resigned June 7, 1804, and Democratic-Republican William B. Giles was appointed August 11, 1804, to continue the term. Giles was elected to the other seat, so he resigned and Democratic-Republican Andrew Moore was elected December 4, 1804, to finish the term.

== See also ==
- 1804 United States elections
  - 1804 United States presidential election
  - 1804–05 United States House of Representatives elections
- 8th United States Congress
- 9th United States Congress
