= 1802–03 United States Senate elections =

- Dates vary by state
- Class 1

11 of the 32 seats in the United States Senate (plus special elections) 17 seats needed for a majority
	Majority party	Minority party
Party	Democratic-Republican	Federalist
Seats before	17	15
Seats after	22	9
Seat change	▲5	▼6
Seats up	2	9
Races won	7	3
- Results: Dem-Republican hold Dem-Republican gain Federalist hold Legislature failed to elect
Majority Party before election
Democratic-Republican
Elected Majority Party
Democratic-Republican

The 1802–03 United States Senate elections were held on various dates in various states. As these U.S. Senate elections were prior to the ratification of the Seventeenth Amendment in 1913, senators were chosen by state legislatures. Senators were elected over a wide range of time throughout 1802 and 1803, and a seat may have been filled months late or remained vacant due to legislative deadlock. In these elections, terms were up for the senators in Class 1.

The Democratic-Republican Party maintained and greatly expanded their majority of seats to over two-thirds of the Senate.

== Change in composition ==
=== Before the elections ===
Accounting for the 1802 special elections in New York, Rhode Island, and South Carolina.

DR_{6}	DR_{5}	DR_{4}	DR_{3}	DR_{2} S.C. (sp); Hold	DR_{1} N.Y. (sp); Hold				
DR_{7}	DR_{8}	DR_{9}	DR_{10}	DR_{11}	DR_{12}	DR_{13}	DR_{14}	DR_{15}	DR_{16} Va. (reg); Ran
Majority →									DR_{17} Tenn. Unknown
F_{7} Conn. Ran	F_{8} Del. Ran	F_{9} Md. Ran	F_{10} N.J. (reg); Ran	F_{11} N.Y. (reg); Ran	F_{12} Vt. Ran	F_{13} R.I. Retired	F_{14} Pa. Retired	F_{15} Mass. Retired	DR_{17} Tenn. Unknown
F_{6}	F_{5}	F_{4}	F_{3}	F_{2}	F_{1} R.I. (sp); Hold				

=== Result of the regular elections ===
DR_{6}	DR_{5}	DR_{4}	DR_{3}	DR_{2}	DR_{1}				
DR_{7}	DR_{8}	DR_{9}	DR_{10}	DR_{11}	DR_{12}	DR_{13}	DR_{14}	DR_{15}	DR_{16} Md. Re-elected
Majority →									DR_{17} N.Y. (reg); Gain
F_{7} Conn. Re-elected	F_{8} Del. Re-elected	F_{9} Mass. Hold	V_{1} N.J. (reg); Fed loss	V_{2} Tenn. DR loss	DR_{21} Va. (reg); Gain	DR_{20} Vt. Gain	DR_{19} R.I. Gain	DR_{18} Pa. Gain	DR_{17} N.Y. (reg); Gain
F_{6}	F_{5}	F_{4}	F_{3}	F_{2}	F_{1}				

=== Beginning of the first session, October 17, 1803 ===
DR_{7}	DR_{6}	DR_{5}	DR_{4}	DR_{3}	DR_{2}	DR_{1}			
DR_{8}	DR_{9}	DR_{10}	DR_{11}	DR_{12}	DR_{13}	DR_{14}	DR_{15}	DR_{16}	DR_{17}
Majority →									DR_{18}
F_{8}	F_{9}	DR_{25} Ohio; New state	DR_{24} Ohio; New state	DR_{23} N.J. (reg); Appointee elected	DR_{22} Tenn. Re-elected	DR_{21}	DR_{20}	DR_{19}	DR_{18}
F_{7}	F_{6}	F_{5}	F_{4}	F_{3}	F_{2}	F_{1}			

Key:

DR_{#}	Democratic-Republican
F_{#}	Federalist
V_{#}	Vacant

== Race summaries ==
Unless noted, the number following candidates is the whole number vote(s), not a percentage.

=== Special elections during the 7th Congress ===
In these special elections, the winner was seated before March 4, 1803; ordered by election date.

State	Incumbent			Results	Candidates
State	Senator	Party	Electoral history	Results	Candidates
Delaware (Class 1)	Samuel White	Federalist	1801 (appointed)	Interim appointee elected January 14, 1802.	▌ ✓ Samuel White (Federalist) 17; ▌Archibald Alexander (Democratic-Republican) 10
New York (Class 3)	John Armstrong Jr.	Democratic- Republican	1800 (special)	Incumbent resigned February 5, 1802. Winner elected February 11, 1802. Democratic-Republican hold.	▌ ✓ DeWitt Clinton (Democratic-Republican) 82; ▌Matthew Clarkson (Federalist) 45
New Hampshire (Class 3)	James Sheafe	Federalist	1800	Incumbent resigned June 14, 1802. Winner elected June 17, 1802. Federalist hold.	▌ ✓ William Plumer (Federalist) 86; ▌Nicholas Gilman (Democratic-Republican) 70; ▌Nahum Parker (Democratic-Republican) 2
South Carolina (Class 3)	John E. Colhoun	Democratic- Republican	1800	Incumbent died October 26, 1802. Winner elected November 4, 1802. Democratic-Republican hold.	▌ ✓ Pierce Butler (Democratic-Republican) 103; ▌Thomas Edwards (Unknown) 3; ▌R. Anderson (Unknown) 1; ▌John Douglass (Unknown) 1; ▌E. More (Unknown) 1; ▌[FNU] Pickens (Unknown) 1; ▌A. B. Stark (Unknown) 1; ▌[FNU] Tucker (Unknown) 1; ▌B. Waring (Unknown) 1; Nothing 1; Blank 11

=== Races leading to the 8th Congress ===
In these regular elections, the winner was seated on March 4, 1803; ordered by state.

All of the elections involved the Class 1 seats.

State	Incumbent			Results	Candidates
State	Senator	Party	Electoral history	Results	Candidates
Connecticut	James Hillhouse	Federalist	1796	Incumbent re-elected October 27, 1802.	▌ ✓ James Hillhouse (Federalist) 117; ▌Ephraim Kirby (Democratic-Republican) 53; ▌Oliver Ellsworth (Federalist) 2; ▌Nathaniel Smith (Federalist) 1
Delaware	Samuel White	Federalist	1801 (appointed); 1802 (special)	Incumbent re-elected January 11, 1803.	▌ ✓ Samuel White (Federalist) 20; ▌George Read (Democratic-Republican) 9
Maryland	John E. Howard	Federalist	1796 (special); 1796	Incumbent lost re-election. New senator elected November 17, 1802. Democratic-Republican gain.	▌ ✓ Samuel Smith (Democratic-Republican) 46; ▌John Eager Howard (Federalist) 30
Massachusetts	Jonathan Mason	Federalist	1800 (special)	Incumbent retired. New senator elected February 7, 1803, on the fourth ballot. Federalist hold.	▌ ✓ John Quincy Adams (Federalist) 105; ▌Thompson J. Skinner (Democratic-Republican) 70; ▌Nicholas Tillinghast (Federalist) 9; ▌Timothy Pickering (Federalist) 6
New Jersey	Aaron Ogden	Federalist	1801 (special)	Incumbent lost re-election. Legislature failed to elect. Federalist loss.	▌Joseph Bloomfield (Democratic-Republican) 26; ▌Aaron Ogden (Federalist) 26
New York	Gouverneur Morris	Federalist	1800 (special)	Incumbent lost re-election. New senator elected February 1, 1803, on the 2nd ballot. Democratic-Republican gain.	▌ ✓ Theodorus Bailey (Democratic-Republican) 59; ▌John Woodworth (Democratic-Republican) 57; ▌Gouverneur Morris (Federalist) eliminated on 1st ballot
Pennsylvania	James Ross	Federalist	1794 (special); 1797	Incumbent retired. New senator elected December 14, 1802. Democratic-Republican gain.	▌ ✓ Samuel Maclay (Democratic-Republican) 59.46%; ▌Isaac Weaver Jr. (Democratic-Republican) 25.23%; ▌William Maclay (Democratic-Republican) 9.91%; Not voting 5.41%
Rhode Island	Theodore Foster	Federalist	1796	Incumbent retired. New senator elected in 1802. Democratic-Republican gain.	▌ ✓ Samuel J. Potter (Democratic-Republican); Unopposed
Tennessee	Joseph Anderson	Democratic- Republican	1799 (special)	Legislature did not elect until September 22, 1803, after the term began; see below. Democratic-Republican loss.	None.
Vermont	Nathaniel Chipman	Federalist	1797 (special)	Incumbent lost re-election. New senator elected in 1802. Democratic-Republican gain.	▌ ✓ Israel Smith (Democratic-Republican), 111; ▌Abel Spencer (Federalist), 79; Scattering 6
Virginia	Stevens Mason	Democratic- Republican	1794 (special); 1796	Incumbent re-elected in 1803.	▌ ✓ Stevens Mason (Democratic-Republican); [data missing]

=== Special elections during the 8th Congress ===
In this special election, the winner was seated in 1803 after March 4.

State	Incumbent			Results	Candidates
State	Senator	Party	Electoral history	Results	Candidates
Massachusetts (Class 2)	Dwight Foster	Federalist	1800 (special)	Incumbent resigned March 2, 1803. Winner elected March 2, 1803, on the second ballot. Federalist hold.	▌ ✓ Timothy Pickering (Federalist) 76; ▌Thomson J. Skinner (Democratic-Republican) 52; ▌Nicholas Tillinghast (Federalist) 3; ▌Henry Knox (Federalist) 1; ▌Benjamin Pickman Jr. (Federalist) 1
Ohio (Class 1)	None (new state)			Ohio joined the Union in 1803. Winner elected April 1, 1803. Democratic-Republican gain.	▌ ✓ John Smith (Democratic-Republican)
Ohio (Class 3)	None (new state)			Ohio joined the Union in 1803. Winner elected April 1, 1803. Democratic-Republican gain.	▌ ✓ Thomas Worthington (Democratic-Republican)
Tennessee (Class 1)	Vacant			Legislature had failed to elect. Predecessor re-elected late September 22, 1803 on the 4th ballot. Democratic-Republican gain.	▌ ✓ Joseph Anderson (Democratic-Republican) 19; ▌Daniel Smith (Democratic-Republican) 17
New Jersey (Class 1)	John Condit	Democratic- Republican	1803 (appointed)	Legislature failed to elect. Condit was appointed September 1, 1803, to continue the term. He was then elected November 3, 1803.	▌ ✓ John Condit (Democratic-Republican); Unanimous
Virginia (Class 1)	John Taylor	Democratic- Republican	1792 (special); 1793	Predecessor Stevens T. Mason (DR) had died May 10, 1803, having just begun the new term. Interim appointee served from June 4, 1803, and did not seek election to finish the term. Winner elected December 7, 1803. Democratic-Republican hold.	▌ ✓ Abraham B. Venable (Democratic-Republican); Unanimous

=== Early race leading to the Congress-after-next ===
In this regular election, the winner was seated on March 4, 1805; ordered by state.

This election involved a Class 2 seat.

State	Incumbent			Results	Candidates
State	Senator	Party	Electoral history	Results	Candidates
Tennessee	William Cocke	Democratic- Republican	1799 (special)	Incumbent retired. New senator elected early September 23, 1803. Democratic-Republican hold.	▌ ✓ Daniel Smith (Democratic-Republican) 35; ▌Jenkin Whiteside (Democratic-Republican) 1

== Connecticut ==
Federalist incumbent James Hillhouse (originally elected in 1796) was re-elected.

== Maryland ==
1802 United States Senate election in Maryland
- November 17, 1802

80 members of the Maryland General Assembly
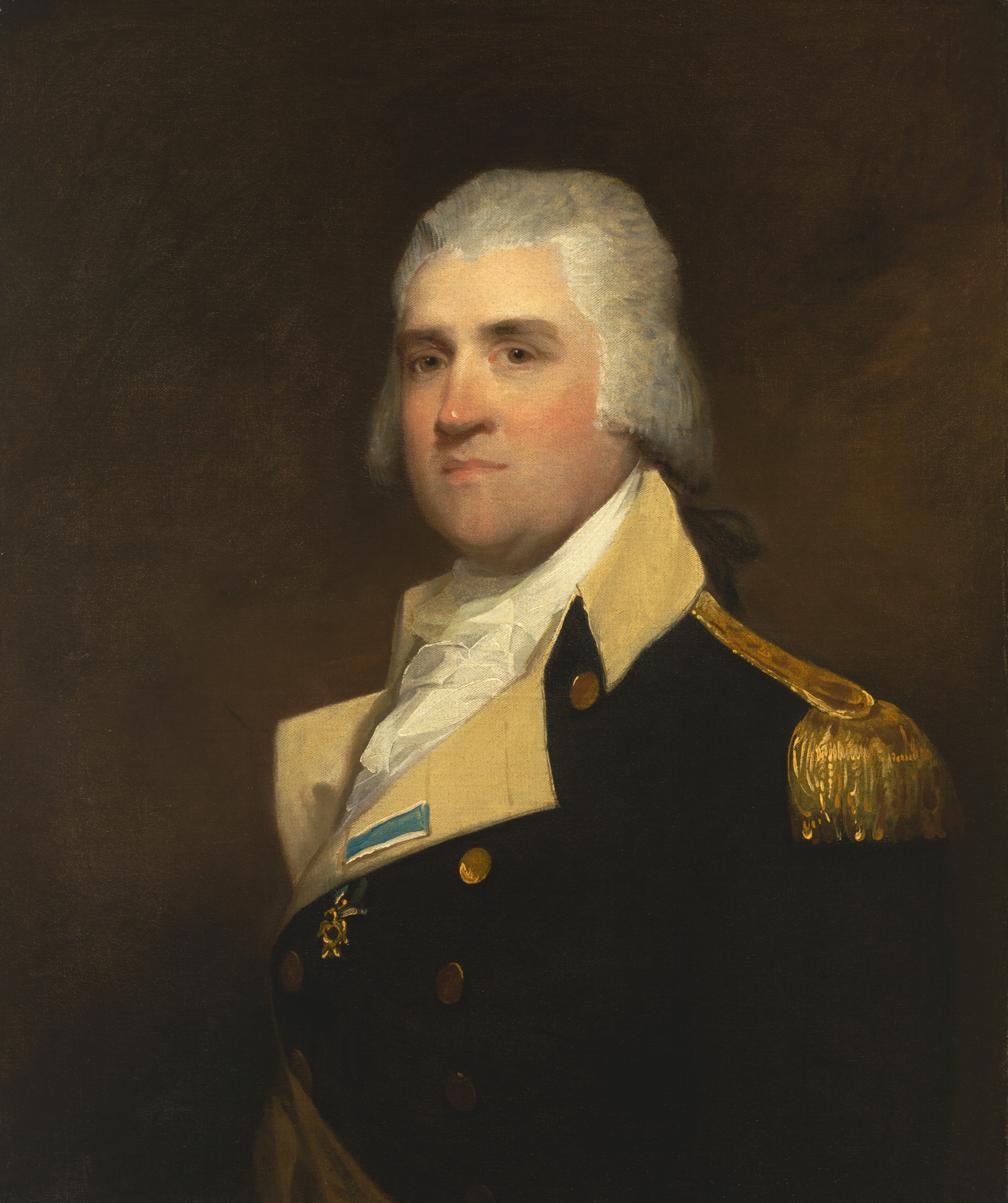

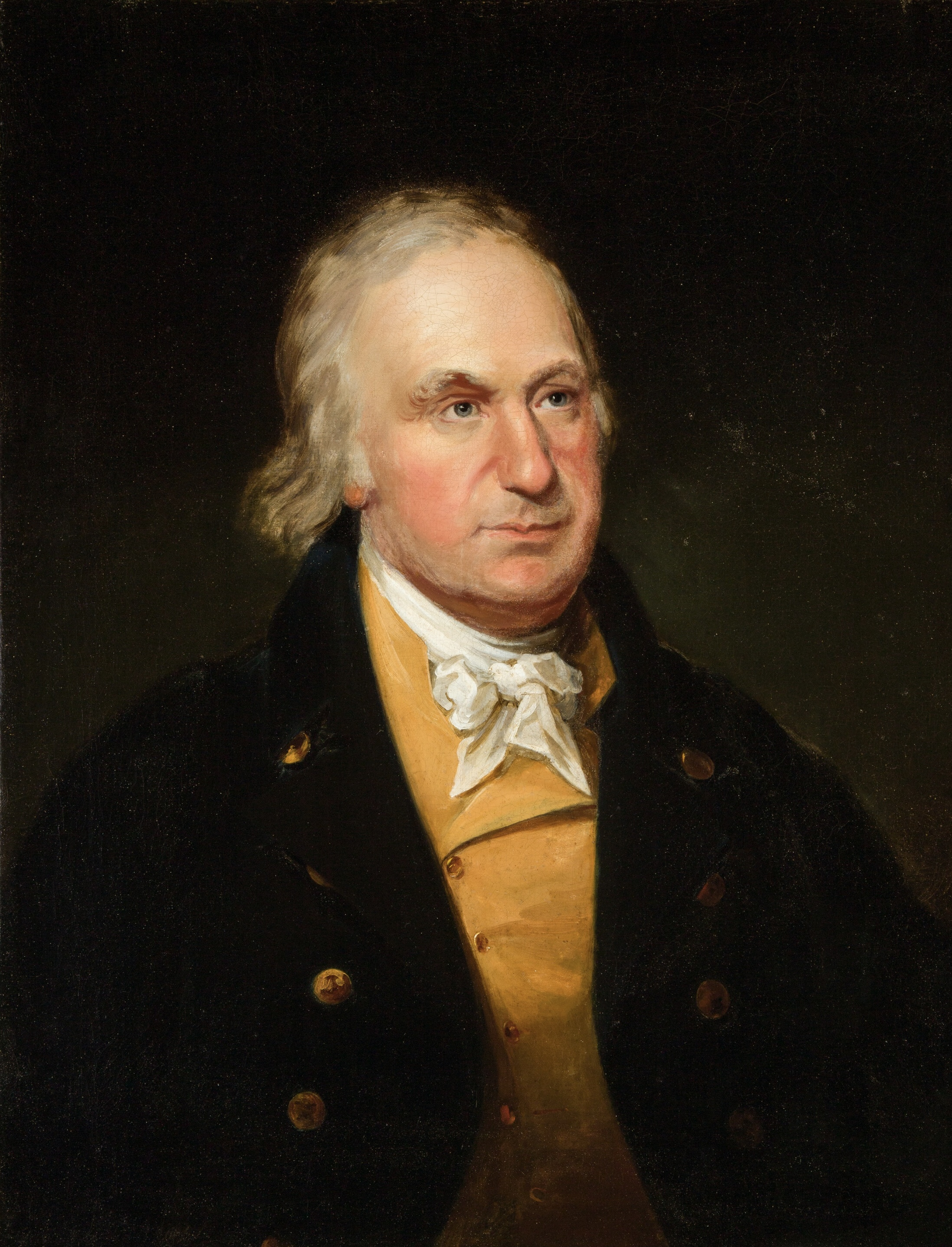
Candidate	Samuel Smith	John Eager Howard
Party	Democratic-Republican	Federalist
Legislative vote	46	30
Percentage	60.53%	39.47%

Samuel Smith won election over John Eager Howard by a margin of 21.05%, or 16 votes, for the Class 1 seat.

== New Jersey ==
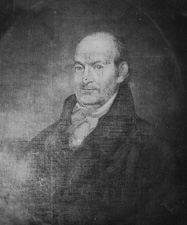
Senator John Condit

There were two elections to the class 1 seat.

=== New Jersey (regular) ===
The New Jersey legislature failed to elect by the March 4, 1803, beginning of the term.

=== New Jersey (special) ===
The governor appointed Democratic-Republican John Condit September 1, 1803, to continue the term. Condit was then unanimously elected November 3, 1803, to finish the term. No vote totals were recorded.

== New York ==
=== New York (special) ===
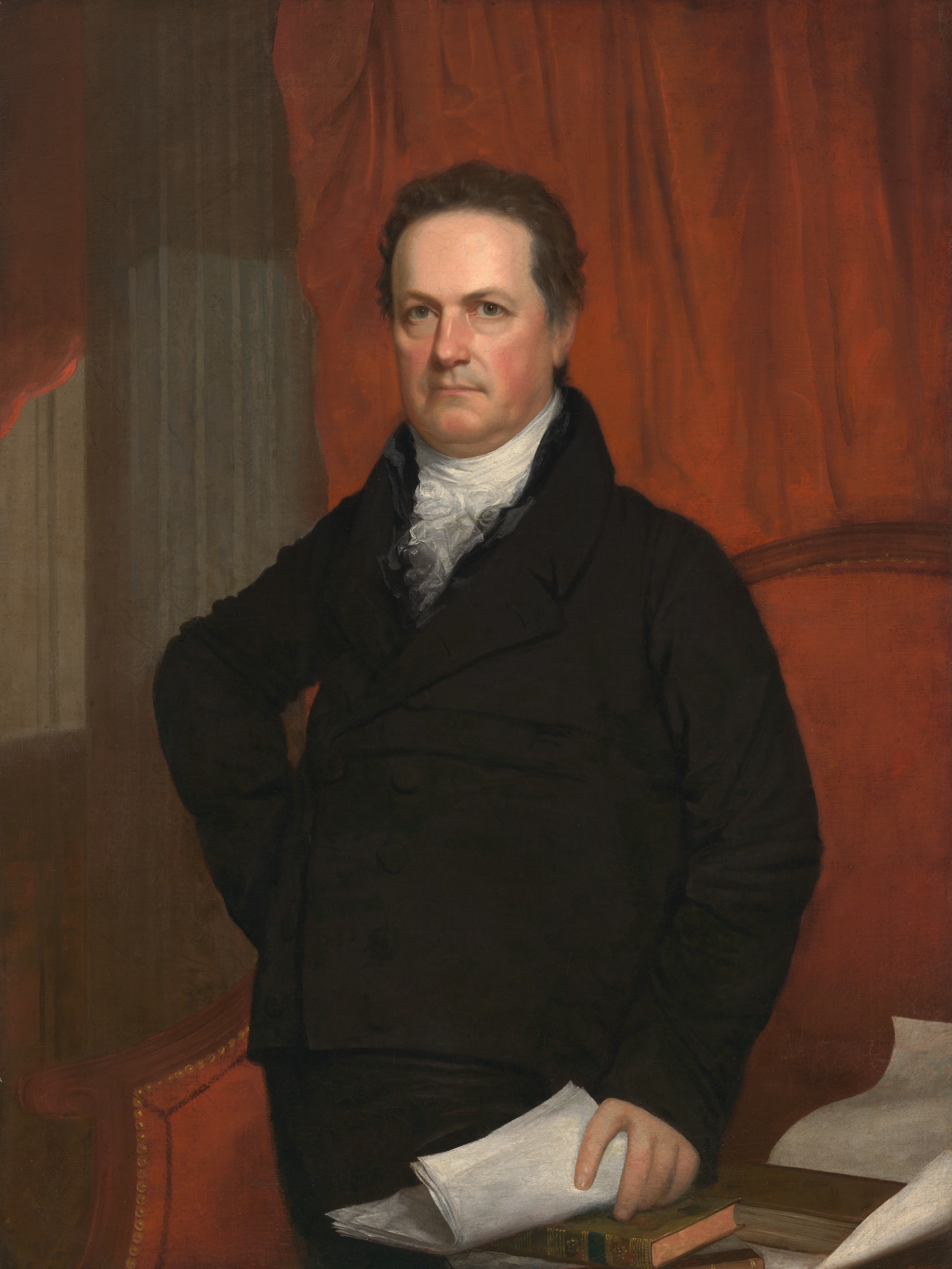
Senator DeWitt Clinton

Democratic-Republican John Armstrong Jr., who had held the class 3 seat since 1801, resigned February 5, 1802, and Democratic-Republican DeWitt Clinton was elected February 23, 1802, to finish the term. Clinton, however, resigned November 4, 1803, and Armstrong was appointed December 8, 1803, to his old seat.

=== New York (regular) ===
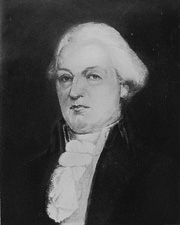
Senator Theodorus Bailey

Federalist Gouverneur Morris lost re-election to the class 1 seat to Democratic-Republican Theodorus Bailey in 1803.

== Ohio ==
Ohio joined the Union in 1803. New Democratic-Republican senators were elected April 1, 1803. Official records indicate that John Smith and Thomas Worthington were elected, and that Smith received the "long" term, while Worthington received the "short" one. They do not indicate if there were other candidates, or what the vote totals were.

== Vermont ==
Federalist Senator Nathaniel Chipman lost re-election to Democratic-Republican Israel Smith. Smith received 102 votes in the Vermont House of Representatives and 9 from the Governor and Council. Spencer received 75 votes from the House and 4 from the Governor and Council.

== Virginia ==
There were two elections to the same seat as the newly-re-elected senator died at the beginning of the next term.

=== Virginia (regular) ===
Two-term Democratic-Republican Stevens Mason was re-elected in 1803.

=== Virginia (special) ===
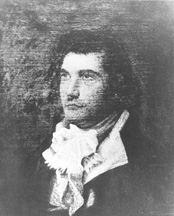
Senator Abraham B. Venable

Mason died May 10, 1803, having just begun the new term. Democratic-Republican John Taylor was appointed but chose not to run to finish the term. Democratic-Republican Abraham B. Venable was elected December 7, 1803, as the unanimous choice of the Virginia General Assembly. No vote totals were recorded.

== See also ==
- 1802 United States elections
  - 1802–03 United States House of Representatives elections
- 7th United States Congress
- 8th United States Congress

== Sources ==
- Party Division in the Senate, 1789-Present, via Senate.gov
