= 1802 United States Senate special election in Delaware =

- January 14, 1802
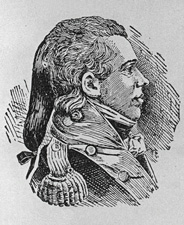

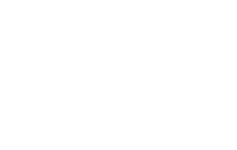
Nominee	Samuel White	Archibald Alexander
Party	Federalist	Democratic-Republican
Popular vote	17	10
Percentage	62.96%	37.04%
U.S. senator before election
Henry Latimer
Federalist
Elected U.S. Senator
Samuel White
Federalist

The 1802 United States Senate special election in Delaware was held on January 14, 1802. Senator Henry Latimer had resigned after becoming unhappy over the tactics of his political opponents who were still bitter over the circumstances of the contested election in 1792. Samuel White defeated Archibald Alexander, who had previously failed to win gubernatorial and House elections, by 10 votes.

== Results ==
1802 United States Senate special election in Delaware
Party	Candidate	Votes	%
Federalist	Samuel White	17	62.96%
Democratic-Republican	Archibald Alexander	10	37.04%
Total votes		27	100%
