= 1801 United States Senate election in New York =

The 1801 United States Senate election in New York was held on January 27, 1801, by the New York State Legislature to elect a U.S. senator (Class 3) to represent the State of New York in the United States Senate.

== Background ==
John Armstrong had been elected in November 1800 to fill the vacancy of this seat, and had taken his seat on January 8, 1801.

At the state election in April 1800, a Democratic-Republican majority of 28 was elected to the assembly, but the Senate had a majority of 7 Federalists. The 24th New York State Legislature met from November 4 to 7, 1800; and from January 27 to April 8, 1801, at Albany, New York.

== Candidates ==
The incumbent U.S. senator John Armstrong ran for re-election as the candidate of the Democratic-Republican Party.

== Result ==
The incumbent Armstrong was re-elected. Votes were not recorded.

1801 United States senator election result
Office	House	Democratic-Republican candidate	Federalist candidate
U.S. senator	State Senate (43 members)	John Armstrong	
	State Assembly (107 members)	John Armstrong	

== Aftermath ==
Armstrong resigned on February 5, 1802, to make place for DeWitt Clinton who was elected by the state legislature in a special election to fill the vacancy.

== Sources ==
- The New York Civil List compiled in 1858 (see: pg. 62f for U.S. Senators; pg. 117f for state senators 1800–01; page 174 for Members of Assembly 1800–01)
- Members of the 7th United States Congress
- The Documentary History of the First Federal Elections, 1788-1790 by Merrill Jensen & Robert A. Becker (Vol. 2; page 412)
