= February 1804 United States Senate special elections in New York =

The first 1804 United States Senate special election in New York was held on February 3, 1804, by the New York State Legislature to elect two United States senators (Class 1 and 3) to represent the State of New York in the United States Senate.

== Background ==
DeWitt Clinton had been elected in 1802 to the Class 3 seat (term 1801–1807) to fill the vacancy caused by the resignation of John Armstrong. Clinton resigned on November 4, 1803, after his appointment as Mayor of New York City, and Governor George Clinton appointed Armstrong to his old seat, to fill the vacancy temporarily.

Theodorus Bailey had been elected to the Class 1 seat (term 1803–1809) but resigned on January 16, 1804, after his appointment as Postmaster of New York City.

At the state election in April 1803, 83 Democratic-Republicans and 17 Federalists were elected to the assembly, and 10 Democratic-Republicans were elected to the state senate. The 27th New York State Legislature met from January 31 to April 11, 1804, at Albany, New York.

== Candidates ==
The incumbent U.S. Senator Armstrong for re-election, and Congressman John Smith, ran as the candidates of the Democratic-Republican Party.

The Federalist Party had by now only small minorities in both houses of the legislature, and Ex-New York Supreme Court Justice Jacob Radcliff and Ex-2nd U.S. Circuit Court Chief Justice Egbert Benson received only a few scattering votes.

== Result ==
Armstrong and Smith were elected "without much opposition." (see Hammond)

February 1804 United States Senator special election result
Office	House	Democratic-Republican		Federalist		Federalist	
U.S. Senator (Class 1)	State Senate (32 members)	John Armstrong					
	State Assembly (99 members)	John Armstrong	83	Jacob Radcliff	4	Egbert Benson	3
U.S. Senator (Class 3)	State Senate (32 members)	John Smith					
	State Assembly (99 members)	John Smith	unan.				

Obs.: Smith was nominated unanimously by the Assembly, but the exact number of votes given is unclear.

== Aftermath ==
John Smith took his seat on February 23, 1804, and was re-elected in 1807 to a full term, serving until March 3, 1813.

John Armstrong took his seat on February 25, but resigned his seat already on June 30, 1804, after his appointment as U.S. Minister to France, a post on which he succeeded his brother-in-law Robert R. Livingston. To fill the vacancy, the state legislature held a special election in November 1804, and elected Samuel L. Mitchill.

== Sources ==
- The New York Civil List compiled in 1858 (see: pg. 63 for U.S. Senators; pg. 118f for state senators 1803–04; pg. 177f for Members of Assembly 1803–04) [gives date of election "February 3"]
- Members of the 8th United States Congress
- History of Political Parties in the State of New-York by Jabez Delano Hammond (page 202) [gives date of election "2d February"]
- Election result (Armstrong) at Tufts University Library project "A New Nation Votes"
- Election result (Smith) at Tufts University Library project "A New Nation Votes"
