= 1800–01 United States Senate elections =

- Dates vary by state
- Class 3

10 of the 32 seats in the United States Senate (plus special elections) 17 seats needed for a majority
	Majority party	Minority party
Party	Federalist	Democratic-Republican
Seats before	21 (65.6%)	11 (34.4%)
Seats after	17 (54.8%)	14 (45.2%)
Seat change	▼4	▲3
Seats up	7	3
Races won	3	6
- Results: Federalist hold Federalist gain Dem-Republican hold Dem-Republican gain
Majority Party before election
Federalist
Elected Majority Party
Federalist

The 1800–01 United States Senate elections were held on various dates in various states, coinciding with Thomas Jefferson being elected to the White House. As these U.S. Senate elections were prior to the ratification of the Seventeenth Amendment in 1913, senators were chosen by state legislatures. Senators were elected over a wide range of time throughout 1800 and 1801, and a seat may have been filled months late or remained vacant due to legislative deadlock. In these elections, terms were up for the senators in Class 3.

Although the Federalists began the 7th Congress with a slim majority, Jefferson's Democratic-Republican Party took over the majority shortly thereafter due to mid-year special elections. By the time the first proper session of the 7th Congress met in December 1801, three seats had been gained by the Democratic-Republicans, leaving them with an overall majority of 17 seats and a government trifecta.

== Change in composition ==
=== Before the November elections ===
After the November 6, 1800 special election in New York.

DR_{6}	DR_{5}	DR_{4}	DR_{3}	DR_{2}	DR_{1}				
DR_{7}	DR_{8}	DR_{9} N.H. Ran	DR_{10} N.Y. Ran	DR_{11} N.C. Retired	F_{21} Vt. Ran	F_{20} S.C. Ran	F_{19} Pa. Retired	F_{18} Md. Unknown	F_{17} Ky. Ran
Majority →									F_{17} Ky. Ran
F_{7}	F_{8}	F_{9}	F_{10}	F_{11}	F_{12}	F_{13}	F_{14}	F_{15} Conn. Ran	F_{16} Ga. Retired
F_{6}	F_{5}	F_{4}	F_{3}	F_{2}	F_{1}				

=== Result of the November elections ===
DR_{6}	DR_{5}	DR_{4}	DR_{3}	DR_{2}	DR_{1}				
DR_{7}	DR_{8}	DR_{9} Ga. Gain	DR_{10} Ky. Gain	DR_{11} N.Y. Re-elected	DR_{12} N.C. Hold	DR_{13} Pa. Gain	DR_{14} S.C. Gain	V_{1} Md. F loss	F_{17} Vt. Re-elected
Majority →									F_{17} Vt. Re-elected
F_{7}	F_{8}	F_{9}	F_{10}	F_{11}	F_{12}	F_{13}	F_{14}	F_{15} Conn. Re-elected	F_{16} N.H. Gain
F_{6}	F_{5}	F_{4}	F_{3}	F_{2}	F_{1}				

=== Beginning of the 7th Congress, March 4, 1801 ===
DR_{6}	DR_{5}	DR_{4}	DR_{3}	DR_{2}	DR_{1}				
DR_{7}	DR_{8}	DR_{9}	DR_{10}	DR_{11}	DR_{12}	DR_{13}	DR_{14}	F_{18} Md. Appointed	F_{17}
Majority →									F_{17}
F_{7}	F_{8}	F_{9}	F_{10}	F_{11}	F_{12}	F_{13}	F_{14}	F_{15}	F_{16}
F_{6}	F_{5}	F_{4}	F_{3}	F_{2}	F_{1}				

=== End of 1801 ===
DR_{6}	DR_{5}	DR_{4}	DR_{3}	DR_{2}	DR_{1}				
DR_{7}	DR_{8}	DR_{9}	DR_{10}	DR_{11}	DR_{12}	DR_{13} Md. Gain	DR_{14} Pa. Hold	DR_{15} R.I. Gain	DR_{16} S.C. Hold
Majority →									DR_{17} Vt. Gain
F_{7}	F_{8}	F_{9}	F_{10}	F_{11}	F_{12}	F_{13}	F_{14}	F_{15} N.H. Hold	DR_{17} Vt. Gain
F_{6}	F_{5}	F_{4}	F_{3}	F_{2}	F_{1}				

Key

DR_{#}	Democratic-Republican
F_{#}	Federalist
V_{#}	Vacant

== Race summaries ==
Except if/when noted, the number following candidates is the whole number vote(s), not a percentage.

=== Special elections during the preceding Congress ===
In these special elections, the winner was seated before March 4, 1801; ordered by election date.

State	Incumbent			Results	Candidates
State	Senator	Party	Electoral history	Results	Candidates
New York (Class 1)	James Watson	Federalist	1798 (special)	Incumbent resigned March 19, 1800, to become Naval Officer of the Port of New York. New senator elected April 3, 1800. Federalist hold.	▌ ✓ Gouverneur Morris (Federalist) 79 (56.8%); ▌Peter Gansevoort (Democratic-Republican) 59 (42.4%); ▌Thomas Morris (Federalist) 1 (0.7%)
Massachusetts (Class 2)	Samuel Dexter	Federalist	1798	Incumbent resigned May 30, 1800 to become U.S. Secretary of War. New senator elected June 6, 1800. Federalist hold.	▌ ✓ Dwight Foster (Federalist) 158
New York (Class 3)	John Laurance	Federalist	1796 (special)	Incumbent resigned August 1800. New senator elected November 6, 1800. Democratic-Republican gain.	▌ ✓ John Armstrong (Democratic-Republican) 141 (98.7%); ▌Peter Gansevoort (Democratic-Republican) 2 (1.3%)
Massachusetts (Class 1)	Benjamin Goodhue	Federalist	1796 (special); 1796	Incumbent resigned November 8, 1800. New senator elected November 14, 1800. Federalist hold.	▌ ✓ Jonathan Mason (Federalist); [data missing]
Maryland (Class 3)	James Lloyd	Federalist	1797 (special)	Incumbent resigned December 1, 1800. New senator elected December 12, 1800. Federalist hold.	▌ ✓ William Hindman (Federalist) 49 (55.1%); ▌Richard T. Earle (Democratic-Republican) 40 (44.9%)
New Jersey (Class 1)	James Schureman	Federalist	1799 (special)	Incumbent resigned February 16, 1801. New senator elected February 28, 1801. Federalist hold.	▌ ✓ Aaron Ogden (Federalist); [data missing]

=== Races leading to the next Congress ===
In these regular elections, the winner was seated on March 4, 1801; ordered by state.

All of the elections involved the Class 3 seats.

State	Incumbent			Results	Candidates
State	Senator	Party	Electoral history	Results	Candidates
Connecticut	Uriah Tracy	Federalist	1796 (special)	Incumbent re-elected in May 1801.	▌ ✓ Uriah Tracy (Federalist) 131; ▌Asher Miller (Democratic-Republican) 30; ▌Roger Griswold (Federalist) 10; ▌Ephraim Kirby (Democratic-Republican) 6; ▌Chauncey Goodrich (Federalist) 3; ▌Stephen T. Hosmer (Unknown) 1
Georgia	James Gunn	Federalist	1789; 1794	Incumbent retired. New senator elected November 19, 1800. Democratic-Republican gain.	▌ ✓ James Jackson (Democratic-Republican) 58; ▌Thomas P. Carnes (Federalist) 9
Kentucky	Humphrey Marshall	Federalist	1794	Incumbent lost re-election. New senator elected November 20, 1800. Democratic-Republican gain.	▌ ✓ John Breckinridge (Democratic-Republican) 68; ▌John Adair (Federalist) 13
Maryland	William Hindman	Federalist	1797 (special)	Legislature failed to elect. Incumbent was later appointed to begin the next term.	None.
New Hampshire	John Langdon	Democratic- Republican	1788; 1794 or 1795	Incumbent lost re-election. New senator elected June 21, 1800. Federalist gain.	▌ ✓ James Sheafe (Federalist) 83; ▌John Langdon (Democratic-Republican) 12; ▌Other 38
New York	John Armstrong	Democratic- Republican	1800 (special)	Incumbent re-elected January 27, 1801.	▌ ✓ John Armstrong (Democratic-Republican) 76; Unanimous
North Carolina	Timothy Bloodworth	Democratic- Republican	1795	Incumbent retired. New senator elected November 27, 1800. Democratic-Republican hold.	▌ ✓ David Stone (Democratic-Republican) 94; ▌William R. Davie (Federalist) 72; ▌Richard D. Spaight (Democratic-Republican) 8; ▌Matthew Locke (Democratic-Republican) 1
Pennsylvania	William Bingham	Federalist	1795	Incumbent retired. New senator elected February 18, 1801. Democratic-Republican gain.	▌ ✓ Peter Muhlenberg (Democratic-Republican) 50.0%; ▌George Logan (Democratic-Republican) 48.9%; ▌William Jones (Democratic-Republican) 1.0%
South Carolina	Jacob Read	Federalist	1794	Incumbent lost re-election. New senator elected in 1800 on the second ballot. Democratic-Republican gain.	▌ ✓ John E. Colhoun (Democratic-Republican) 75; ▌John Ward (Federalist) 73
Vermont	Elijah Paine	Federalist	1794	Incumbent re-elected October 21, 1800.	▌ ✓ Elijah Paine (Federalist) 108; ▌S. R. Bradley (Democratic-Republican) 68; ▌Nathaniel Niles (Democratic-Republican) 3; ▌William Chamberlain (Federalist) 2; ▌Lot Hall (Unknown) 1

=== Special elections during the next Congress ===
In these special elections, the winner was seated after March 4, 1801; ordered by election date.

State	Incumbent			Results	Candidates
State	Senator	Party	Electoral history	Results	Candidates
Rhode Island (Class 2)	Ray Greene	Federalist	1797 (special); 1798	Incumbent resigned March 5, 1801. New senator elected May 6, 1801. Democratic-Republican gain.	▌ ✓ Christopher Ellery (Democratic-Republican); [data missing]
New Hampshire (Class 2)	Samuel Livermore	Federalist	1798 (special)	Incumbent resigned June 12, 1801. New senator elected June 17, 1801. Federalist hold.	▌ ✓ Simeon Olcott (Federalist) 97; ▌John Langdon (Democratic-Republican) 56; Others 4
Vermont (Class 3)	Elijah Paine	Federalist	1794; 1800	Incumbent resigned September 1, 1801. New senator elected October 14, 1801. Democratic-Republican gain.	▌ ✓ Stephen R. Bradley (Democratic-Republican) 102; ▌William Chamberlain (Federalist) 85; ▌Nathaniel Niles (Democratic-Republican) 1
Maryland (Class 3)	William Hindman	Federalist	1800 (Appointed)	Incumbent appointee did not run to finish the term New senator elected November 12, 1801 on the second ballot. Democratic-Republican gain.	▌ ✓ Robert Wright (Democratic-Republican) 60; ▌William Winder (Federalist) 26
South Carolina (Class 2)	Charles Pinckney	Democratic- Republican	1798 (special); 1798	Incumbent resigned June 6, 1801. New senator elected December 3, 1801. Democratic-Republican hold.	▌ ✓ Thomas Sumter (Democratic-Republican) 90; ▌John Rutledge Jr. (Federalist) 47; ▌Thomas Evans (Unknown) 1
Pennsylvania (Class 3)	Peter Muhlenberg	Democratic- Republican	1801	Incumbent resigned June 30, 1801. New senator elected December 17, 1801. Democratic-Republican hold.	▌ ✓ George Logan (Democratic-Republican) 63.6%; ▌Joseph Hiester (Democratic-Republican) 28.0%; Others 8.4%

== Connecticut ==
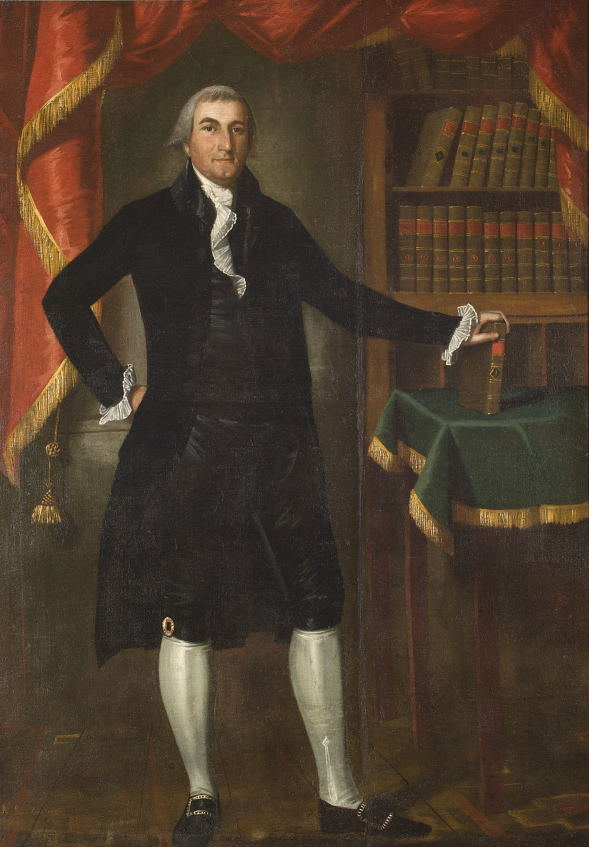
Senator Uriah Tracy

Federalist Uriah Tracy was easily re-elected.

== Maryland ==
=== Maryland (special, 1800) ===
1800 United States Senate special election in Maryland
- December 9, 1800

80 members of the Maryland General Assembly
Candidate	William Hindman	Richard Tilghman Earle
Party	Federalist
Legislative vote	45	44
Percentage	50.56%	49.44%

William Hindman won election over Richard Tilghman Earle by a margin of 10.11%, or 9 votes, for the Class 3 seat.

=== Maryland (regular) ===
The Maryland legislature failed to elect a senator before the March 4, 1801 beginning of the term. As such, William Hindman was appointed to fill the vacancy, and retired when a successor was elected.

=== Maryland (special, 1801) ===
1801 United States Senate special election in Maryland
- December 9, 1800

80 members of the Maryland General Assembly
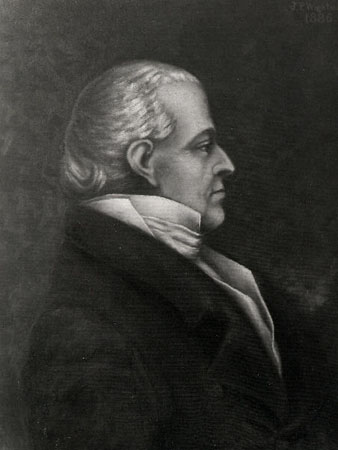
Candidate	Robert Wright	William Winder
Party	Democratic-Republican	Democratic-Republican
Legislative vote	60	26
Percentage	50.56%	30.23%

Robert Wright won election over William Winder by a margin of 39.53%, or 34 votes, for the Class 3 seat.

== See also ==
- 1800 United States elections
  - 1800 United States presidential election
  - 1800–01 United States House of Representatives elections
- 6th United States Congress
- 7th United States Congress
