= List of United States Senate election results by state =

The following table shows regularly scheduled United States Senate elections by state by year. The table does not include appointments or special elections, though it does include elections that occurred upon a state delegation's admission or readmission to the Senate. The table also includes elections that filled vacancies to unexpired terms that had never been filled due to legislative deadlock or an elected candidate's failure to qualify. The table does not denote post-election party switching. Note that, particularly prior to the ratification of the 17th Amendment in 1913, many regular elections took place in odd years rather than in the preceding even years.

== Legend ==
| Label | Party | Label | Party | Label | Party | Label | Party | Label | Party |
| PA | Pro-Administration Faction | AJ | Anti-Jacksonian | FS | Free Soil Party | SR | Silver Republican Party | — | No regularly scheduled election |
| AA | Anti-Administration Faction | D | Democratic Party | A | American Party | FL | Farmer-Labor Party | I | Independent |
| F | Federalist Party | R | Republican Party | Po | Populist Party | | | Sp | Split result |
| DR | Democratic-Republican Party | Nu | Nullifier Party | U | Unionists | | | | |
| J | Jacksonians | W | Whig Party | Ra | Readjuster Party | | | | |

== Table ==
| | | | | | | First Party System | | | | | | | | | | | | | | | | | | Second Party System | | | | | | | | | | | | | | | Third Party System | | | | | | | | | | | | | | | | | | | | | Fourth Party System | | | | | | | | | | | | | | | | | | | Fifth Party System | | | | | | | | | | | | | | | | | | | Sixth Party System | | | | | | | | | | | | | | | | | | | | | | | | | | | | | |
| Year → Class → Congress → | 1789 1 1st | 1789 2 1st | 1789 3 1st | 1790 1 2nd | 1792 2 3rd | 1794 3 4th | 1796 1 5th | 1798 2 6th | 1800 3 7th | 1802 1 8th | 1804 2 9th | 1806 3 10th | 1808 1 11th | 1810 2 12th | 1812 3 13th | 1814 1 14th | 1816 2 15th | 1818 3 16th | 1820 1 17th | 1822 2 18th | 1824 3 19th | 1826 1 20th | Year → Class → Congress → | 1828 2 21st | 1830 3 22nd | 1832 1 23rd | 1834 2 24th | 1836 3 25th | 1838 1 26th | 1840 2 27th | 1842 3 28th | 1844 1 29th | 1846 2 30th | 1848 3 31st | 1850 1 32nd | 1852 2 33rd | 1854 3 34th | Year → Class → Congress → | 1856 1 35th | 1858 2 36th | 1860 3 37th | 1862 1 38th | 1864 2 39th | 1866 3 40th | 1868 1 41st | 1870 2 42nd | 1872 3 43rd | 1874 1 44th | 1876 2 45th | 1878 3 46th | 1880 1 47th | 1882 2 48th | 1884 3 49th | 1886 1 50th | 1888 2 51st | 1890 3 52nd | 1892 1 53rd | 1894 2 54th | Year → Class → Congress → | 1896 3 55th | 1898 1 56th | 1900 2 57th | 1902 3 58th | 1904 1 59th | 1906 2 60th | 1908 3 61st | 1910 1 62nd | 1912 2 63rd | 1914 3 64th | 1916 1 65th | 1918 2 66th | 1920 3 67th | 1922 1 68th | 1924 2 69th | 1926 3 70th | 1928 1 71st | 1930 2 72nd | Year → Class → Congress → | 1932 3 73rd | 1934 1 74th | 1936 2 75th | 1938 3 76th | 1940 1 77th | 1942 2 78th | 1944 3 79th | 1946 1 80th | 1948 2 81st | 1950 3 82nd | 1952 1 83rd | 1954 2 84th | 1956 3 85th | 1958 1 86th | 1960 2 87th | 1962 3 88th | 1964 1 89th | 1966 2 90th | Year → Class → Congress → | 1968 3 91st | 1970 1 92nd | 1972 2 93rd | 1974 3 94th | 1976 1 95th | 1978 2 96th | 1980 3 97th | 1982 1 98th | 1984 2 99th | 1986 3 100th | 1988 1 101st | 1990 2 102nd | 1992 3 103rd | 1994 1 104th | 1996 2 105th | 1998 3 106th | 2000 1 107th | 2002 2 108th | 2004 3 109th | 2006 1 110th | 2008 2 111th | 2010 3 112th | 2012 1 113th | 2014 2 114th | 2016 3 115th | 2018 1 116th | 2020 2 117th | 2022 3 118th | 2024 1 119th | 2026 2 120th |
| Alabama | | | | | | | | | | | | | | | | | | 2DR | — | DR | J | — | Alabama | D | D | — | D | D | — | D | D | — | D | D | — | D | D | Alabama | — | D | — | — | — | — | 2R | D | R | — | D | D | — | D | D | — | D | D | — | D | Alabama | D | — | D | D | — | D | D | — | D | D | — | D | D | — | D | D | — | D | Alabama | D | — | D | D | — | D | D | — | D | D | — | D | D | — | D | D | — | D | Alabama | D | — | D | D | — | D | R | — | D | D | — | D | D | — | R | R | — | R | R | — | R | R | — | R | R | — | R | R | – | R |
| Alaska | | | | | | | | | | | | | | | | | | | | | | | Alaska | | | | | | | | | | | | | | | Alaska | | | | | | | | | | | | | | | | | | | | | Alaska | | | | | | | | | | | | | | | | | | | Alaska | | | | | | | | | | | | | | 2D | D | D | — | D | Alaska | D | — | R | D | — | R | R | — | R | R | — | R | R | — | R | R | — | R | R | — | D | R | — | R | R | — | R | R | – | TBD |
| Arizona | | | | | | | | | | | | | | | | | | | | | | | Arizona | | | | | | | | | | | | | | | Arizona | | | | | | | | | | | | | | | | | | | | | Arizona | | | | | | | | | 2D | D | D | — | R | D | — | D | D | — | Arizona | D | D | — | D | D | — | D | D | — | D | R | — | D | R | — | D | R | — | Arizona | R | R | — | R | D | — | R | D | — | R | D | — | R | R | — | R | R | — | R | R | — | R | R | — | R | D | — | D | D | – |
| Arkansas | | | | | | | | | | | | | | | | | | | | | | | Arkansas | | | | | 2D | — | D | D | — | D | D | — | D | D | Arkansas | — | D | D | — | — | — | 2R | R | R | — | D | D | — | D | D | — | D | D | — | D | Arkansas | D | — | D | D | — | D | D | — | D | D | — | D | D | — | D | D | — | D | Arkansas | D | — | D | D | — | D | D | — | D | D | — | D | D | — | D | D | — | D | Arkansas | D | — | D | D | — | D | D | — | D | D | — | D | D | — | R | D | — | D | D | — | D | R | — | R | R | — | R | R | – | R |
| California | | | | | | | | | | | | | | | | | | | | | | | California | | | | | | | | | | | | 2D | — | D | California | D | — | D | R | — | R | D | — | R | AM | — | D | R | — | R | D | — | R | D | — | California | R | R | — | R | R | — | R | R | — | D | R | — | R | R | — | R | R | — | California | D | R | — | D | R | — | D | R | — | R | R | — | R | D | — | R | R | — | California | D | D | — | D | R | — | D | R | — | D | R | — | D | D | — | D | D | — | D | D | — | D | D | — | D | D | — | D | D | – |
| Colorado | | | | | | | | | | | | | | | | | | | | | | | Colorado | | | | | | | | | | | | | | | Colorado | | | | | | | | | | | 2R | R | — | R | R | — | R | SR | — | R | Colorado | D | — | D | D | — | R | D | — | D | D | — | R | R | — | R | R | — | D | Colorado | D | — | D | D | — | D | R | — | D | R | — | R | D | — | R | R | — | R | Colorado | R | — | D | D | — | R | D | — | R | D | — | R | R | — | R | R | — | R | D | — | D | D | — | R | D | — | D | D | – | D |
| Connecticut | PA | — | PA | PA | — | F | F | — | F | F | — | F | F | — | F | F | — | DR | DR | — | AJ | AJ | Connecticut | — | AJ | AJ | — | D | W | — | D | W | — | W | D | — | R | Connecticut | R | — | R | R | — | R | R | — | LR | D | — | R | R | — | R | R | — | R | R | — | Connecticut | R | R | — | R | R | — | R | R | — | R | R | — | R | R | — | R | R | — | Connecticut | D | D | — | R | D | — | D | R | — | D | R | — | R | D | — | D | D | — | Connecticut | D | R | — | D | R | — | D | R | — | D | D | — | D | D | — | D | D | — | D | I | — | D | D | — | D | D | — | D | D | – |
| Delaware | PA | AA | — | PA | PA | — | F | F | — | F | F | — | F | F | — | F | F | — | F | F | — | J | Delaware | AJ | — | AJ | W | — | W | W | — | W | W | — | D | W | — | Delaware | D | D | — | D | D | — | D | D | — | D | D | — | D | D | — | D | R | — | D | D | Delaware | — | R | R | — | R | R | — | R | D | — | D | R | — | D | R | — | R | R | Delaware | — | R | D | — | D | R | — | R | D | — | R | D | — | R | R | — | R | R | Delaware | — | R | D | — | R | D | — | R | D | — | R | D | — | R | D | — | D | D | — | D | D | — | D | D | — | D | D | — | D | D |
| Florida | | | | | | | | | | | | | | | | | | | | | | | Florida | | | | | | | | | 2D | — | W | D | — | D | Florida | D | — | — | — | — | — | 2R | — | R | D | — | D | D | — | D | D | — | D | D | — | Florida | D | D | — | D | D | — | D | D | — | D | D | — | D | D | — | D | D | — | Florida | D | D | — | D | D | — | D | D | — | D | D | — | D | D | — | D | D | — | Florida | R | D | — | D | D | — | R | D | — | D | R | — | D | R | — | D | D | — | R | D | — | R | D | — | R | R | — | R | R | – |
| Georgia | — | AA | AA | — | AA | F | — | DR | DR | — | DR | DR | — | DR | DR | — | DR | DR | — | DR | J | — | Georgia | D | D | — | D | D | — | W | D | — | W | W | — | D | D | Georgia | — | D | — | — | — | R | — | D | D | — | D | D | — | D | D | — | D | D | — | D | Georgia | D | — | D | D | — | D | D | — | D | D | — | D | D | — | D | D | — | D | Georgia | D | — | D | D | — | D | D | — | D | D | — | D | D | — | D | D | — | D | Georgia | D | — | D | D | — | D | R | — | D | D | — | D | R | — | D | R | — | R | R | — | R | R | — | R | R | — | D | D | – | D |
| Hawaii | | | | | | | | | | | | | | | | | | | | | | | Hawaii | | | | | | | | | | | | | | | Hawaii | | | | | | | | | | | | | | | | | | | | | Hawaii | | | | | | | | | | | | | | | | | | | Hawaii | | | | | | | | | | | | | | Sp | — | D | R | — | Hawaii | D | R | — | D | D | — | D | D | — | D | D | — | D | D | — | D | D | — | D | D | — | D | D | — | D | D | — | D | D | – |
| Idaho | | | | | | | | | | | | | | | | | | | | | | | Idaho | | | | | | | | | | | | | | | Idaho | | | | | | | | | | | | | | | | | | 2R | — | R | Idaho | Po | — | SR | R | — | R | R | — | R | R | — | R | R | — | R | R | — | R | Idaho | D | — | R | D | — | R | D | — | D | R | — | R | D | — | R | D | — | R | Idaho | D | — | R | D | — | R | R | — | R | R | — | R | R | — | R | R | — | R | R | — | R | R | — | R | R | — | R | R | – | R |
| Illinois | | | | | | | | | | | | | | | | | | 2DR | — | DR | J | — | Illinois | D | D | — | D | D | — | D | D | — | D | D | — | D | D | Illinois | — | D | R | — | R | R | — | R | R | — | I | R | — | R | R | — | R | D | — | R | Illinois | R | — | R | R | — | R | R | — | D | R | — | R | R | — | R | R | — | D | Illinois | D | — | D | D | — | R | D | — | D | R | — | D | R | — | D | R | — | R | Illinois | R | — | R | D | — | R | D | — | D | D | — | D | D | — | D | R | — | D | D | — | D | R | — | D | D | — | D | D | – | D |
| Indiana | | | | | | | | | | | | | | | | | 2DR | DR | DR | — | AJ | AJ | Indiana | — | AJ | D | — | W | W | — | D | D | — | D | D | — | D | Indiana | D | — | R | D | — | R | R | — | R | D | — | D | R | — | D | D | — | D | D | — | Indiana | R | R | — | R | R | — | D | D | — | D | R | — | R | D | — | R | R | — | Indiana | D | D | — | D | R | — | R | R | — | R | R | — | R | D | — | D | D | — | Indiana | D | D | — | D | R | — | R | R | — | R | R | — | R | R | — | D | R | — | D | R | — | R | D | — | R | R | — | R | R | – |
| Iowa | | | | | | | | | | | | | | | | | | | | | | | Iowa | | | | | | | | | | | 2D | — | D | FS | Iowa | — | R | R | — | R | R | — | R | R | — | R | R | — | R | R | — | R | R | — | R | Iowa | R | — | R | R | — | R | R | — | R | R | — | R | R | — | R | R | — | R | Iowa | D | — | D | D | — | R | R | — | D | R | — | R | R | — | R | R | — | R | Iowa | D | — | D | D | — | R | R | — | D | R | — | D | R | — | D | R | — | D | R | — | D | R | — | R | R | — | R | R | – | D |
| Kansas | | | | | | | | | | | | | | | | | | | | | | | Kansas | | | | | | | | | | | | | | | Kansas | | | 2R | — | R | R | — | R | R | — | R | R | — | R | R | — | R | Po | — | R | Kansas | Po | — | R | R | — | R | R | — | D | R | — | R | R | — | R | R | — | R | Kansas | D | — | R | R | — | R | R | — | R | R | — | R | R | — | R | R | — | R | Kansas | R | — | R | R | — | R | R | — | R | R | — | R | R | — | R | R | — | R | R | — | R | R | — | R | R | — | R | R | – | D |
| Kentucky | | | | | 2AA | F | — | DR | DR | — | DR | DR | — | DR | DR | — | DR | DR | — | DR | J | — | Kentucky | D | AJ | — | W | W | — | W | W | — | W | W | — | W | W | Kentucky | — | D | D | — | D | D | — | D | D | — | D | D | — | D | D | — | D | D | — | D | Kentucky | R | — | D | D | — | D | R | — | D | D | — | D | R | — | R | D | — | D | Kentucky | D | — | D | D | — | D | D | — | D | D | — | D | R | — | R | R | — | R | Kentucky | R | — | D | D | — | D | D | — | R | D | — | R | D | — | R | R | — | R | R | — | R | R | — | R | R | — | R | R | – | R |
| Year → Class → Congress → | 1789 1 1st | 1789 2 1st | 1789 3 1st | 1790 1 2nd | 1792 2 3rd | 1794 3 4th | 1796 1 5th | 1798 2 6th | 1800 3 7th | 1802 1 8th | 1804 2 9th | 1806 3 10th | 1808 1 11th | 1810 2 12th | 1812 3 13th | 1814 1 14th | 1816 2 15th | 1818 3 16th | 1820 1 17th | 1822 2 18th | 1824 3 19th | 1826 1 20th | Year → Class → Congress → | 1828 2 21st | 1830 3 22nd | 1832 1 23rd | 1834 2 24th | 1836 3 25th | 1838 1 26th | 1840 2 27th | 1842 3 28th | 1844 1 29th | 1846 2 30th | 1848 3 31st | 1850 1 32nd | 1852 2 33rd | 1854 3 34th | Year → Class → Congress → | 1856 1 35th | 1858 2 36th | 1860 3 37th | 1862 1 38th | 1864 2 39th | 1866 3 40th | 1868 1 41st | 1870 2 42nd | 1872 3 43rd | 1874 1 44th | 1876 2 45th | 1878 3 46th | 1880 1 47th | 1882 2 48th | 1884 3 49th | 1886 1 50th | 1888 2 51st | 1890 3 52nd | 1892 1 53rd | 1894 2 54th | Year → Class → Congress → | 1896 3 55th | 1898 1 56th | 1900 2 57th | 1902 3 58th | 1904 1 59th | 1906 2 60th | 1908 3 61st | 1910 1 62nd | 1912 2 63rd | 1914 3 64th | 1916 1 65th | 1918 2 66th | 1920 3 67th | 1922 1 68th | 1924 2 69th | 1926 3 70th | 1928 1 71st | 1930 2 72nd | Year → Class → Congress → | 1932 3 73rd | 1934 1 74th | 1936 2 75th | 1938 3 76th | 1940 1 77th | 1942 2 78th | 1944 3 79th | 1946 1 80th | 1948 2 81st | 1950 3 82nd | 1952 1 83rd | 1954 2 84th | 1956 3 85th | 1958 1 86th | 1960 2 87th | 1962 3 88th | 1964 1 89th | 1966 2 90th | Year → Class → Congress → | 1968 3 91st | 1970 1 92nd | 1972 2 93rd | 1974 3 94th | 1976 1 95th | 1978 2 96th | 1980 3 97th | 1982 1 98th | 1984 2 99th | 1986 3 100th | 1988 1 101st | 1990 2 102nd | 1992 3 103rd | 1994 1 104th | 1996 2 105th | 1998 3 106th | 2000 1 107th | 2002 2 108th | 2004 3 109th | 2006 1 110th | 2008 2 111th | 2010 3 112th | 2012 1 113th | 2014 2 114th | 2016 3 115th | 2018 1 116th | 2020 2 117th | 2022 3 118th | 2024 1 119th | 2026 2 120th |
| Louisiana | | | | | | | | | | | | | | | 2DR | — | DR | DR | — | DR | AJ | — | Louisiana | D | D | — | D | D | — | W | W | — | D | D | — | W | D | Louisiana | — | D | — | — | — | — | 2R | R | D | — | R | D | — | D | D | — | D | D | — | D | Louisiana | D | — | D | D | — | D | D | — | D | D | — | D | D | — | D | D | — | D | Louisiana | D | — | D | D | — | D | D | — | D | D | — | D | D | — | D | D | — | D | Louisiana | D | — | D | D | — | D | D | — | D | D | — | D | D | — | D | D | — | D | R | — | D | R | — | R | R | — | R | R | – | R |
| Maine | | | | | | | | | | | | | | | | | | | 2DR | DR | — | J | Maine | AJ | — | D | D | — | D | W | — | D | D | — | D | W | — | Maine | D | R | — | R | R | — | R | R | — | R | R | — | R | R | — | R | R | — | R | R | Maine | — | R | R | — | R | R | — | D | R | — | R | R | — | R | R | — | R | R | Maine | — | R | R | — | R | R | — | R | R | — | R | R | — | D | R | — | D | R | Maine | — | D | D | — | D | R | — | D | R | — | D | R | — | R | R | — | R | R | — | R | R | — | I | R | — | I | R | — | I | D |
| Maryland | PA | — | PA | PA | — | F | F | — | DR | DR | — | DR | DR | — | F | F | — | DR | DR | — | J | J | Maryland | — | AJ | AJ | — | W | W | — | W | W | — | W | W | — | W | Maryland | A | — | D | U | — | D | D | — | D | D | — | D | D | — | D | D | — | D | D | — | Maryland | R | R | — | D | D | — | D | D | — | D | R | — | R | D | — | D | R | — | Maryland | D | D | — | D | D | — | D | D | — | R | R | — | R | R | — | D | D | — | Maryland | R | R | — | R | D | — | R | D | — | D | D | — | D | D | — | D | D | — | D | D | — | D | D | — | D | D | — | D | D | – |
| Massachusetts | PA | PA | — | PA | PA | — | F | F | — | F | F | — | F | DR | — | F | F | — | F | F | — | AJ | Massachusetts | AJ | — | AJ | W | — | W | W | — | W | W | — | FS | W | — | Massachusetts | R | R | — | R | R | — | R | R | — | R | R | — | R | R | — | R | R | — | R | R | Massachusetts | — | R | R | — | R | R | — | R | R | — | R | D | — | R | R | — | D | D | Massachusetts | — | D | R | — | D | R | — | R | R | — | D | R | — | D | R | — | D | R | Massachusetts | — | D | R | — | D | D | — | D | D | — | D | D | — | D | D | — | D | D | — | D | D | — | D | D | — | D | D | — | D | D |
| Michigan | | | | | | | | | | | | | | | | | | | | | | | Michigan | | | | | 2D | W | | — | D | D | — | D | D | — | Michigan | R | R | — | R | R | — | R | R | — | R | R | — | R | R | — | R | R | — | R | R | Michigan | — | R | R | — | R | R | — | R | R | — | R | R | — | D | R | — | R | R | Michigan | — | R | D | — | R | R | — | R | R | — | R | D | — | D | D | — | D | R | Michigan | — | D | R | — | D | D | — | D | D | — | D | D | — | R | D | — | D | D | — | D | D | — | D | D | — | D | D | — | D | D |
| Minnesota | | | | | | | | | | | | | | | | | | | | | | | Minnesota | | | | | | | | | | | | | | | Minnesota | | Sp | — | R | R | — | R | R | — | R | R | — | R | R | — | R | R | — | R | R | Minnesota | — | R | R | — | R | R | — | R | R | — | R | R | — | FL | R | — | FL | R | Minnesota | — | FL | FL | — | R | R | — | R | D | — | R | D | — | D | D | — | D | D | Minnesota | — | D | D | — | D | R | — | R | R | — | R | D | — | R | D | — | D | R | — | D | D | — | D | D | — | D | D | — | D | D |
| Mississippi | | | | | | | | | | | | | | | | | 2DR | — | DR | DR | — | J | Mississippi | D | — | AJ | D | — | W | D | — | D | D | — | D | D | — | Mississippi | D | D | — | — | — | — | — | 2R | — | R | D | — | D | D | — | D | D | — | D | D | Mississippi | — | D | D | — | D | D | — | D | D | — | D | D | — | D | D | — | D | D | Mississippi | — | D | D | — | D | D | — | D | D | — | D | D | — | D | D | — | D | D | Mississippi | — | D | D | — | D | R | — | D | R | — | R | R | — | R | R | — | R | R | — | R | R | — | R | R | — | R | R | — | R | TBD |
| Missouri | | | | | | | | | | | | | | | | | | | 2DR | — | AJ | J | Missouri | — | D | D | — | D | D | — | D | D | — | D | W | — | D | Missouri | D | — | D | U | — | R | R | — | D | D | — | D | D | — | D | D | — | D | D | — | Missouri | D | D | — | D | R | — | D | D | — | D | D | — | R | D | — | D | R | — | Missouri | D | D | — | D | D | — | R | R | — | D | D | — | D | D | — | D | D | — | Missouri | D | D | — | D | R | — | D | R | — | R | R | — | R | R | — | R | R | — | R | D | — | R | D | — | R | R | — | R | R | – |
| Montana | | | | | | | | | | | | | | | | | | | | | | | Montana | | | | | | | | | | | | | | | Montana | | | | | | | | | | | | | | | | | 2R | — | R | R | Montana | — | D | D | — | R | R | — | D | D | — | D | D | — | D | D | — | D | D | Montana | — | D | D | — | D | D | — | R | D | — | D | D | — | D | D | — | D | D | Montana | — | D | D | — | D | D | — | D | D | — | R | D | — | R | D | — | R | D | — | D | D | — | D | R | — | D | R | — | R | R |
| Nebraska | | | | | | | | | | | | | | | | | | | | | | | Nebraska | | | | | | | | | | | | | | | Nebraska | | | | | | 2R | R | R | — | R | R | — | R | R | — | R | R | — | Po | R | Nebraska | — | R | R | — | R | R | — | D | R | — | D | R | — | R | R | — | R | R | Nebraska | — | D | I | — | R | R | — | R | R | — | R | R | — | R | R | — | R | R | Nebraska | — | R | R | — | D | D | — | D | D | — | D | D | — | D | R | — | D | R | — | D | R | — | R | R | — | R | R | — | R | R |
| Nevada | | | | | | | | | | | | | | | | | | | | | | | Nevada | | | | | | | | | | | | | | | Nevada | | | | | 2R | R | R | — | R | R | — | R | D | — | R | R | — | R | SR | — | Nevada | Si | SR | — | D | R | — | D | R | — | D | D | — | R | D | — | R | D | — | Nevada | D | D | — | D | D | — | D | R | — | D | R | — | D | D | — | D | D | — | Nevada | D | D | — | R | D | — | R | R | — | D | D | — | D | D | — | D | R | — | D | R | — | D | R | — | D | D | — | D | D | – |
| New Hampshire | — | AA | AA | — | PA | DR | — | F | F | — | DR | DR | — | DR | F | — | DR | DR | — | DR | J | — | New Hampshire | AJ | D | — | D | D | — | D | D | — | FS | D | — | D | R | New Hampshire | — | R | R | — | R | R | — | R | R | — | R | R | — | R | R | — | R | R | — | R | New Hampshire | R | — | R | R | — | R | R | — | D | R | — | R | R | — | R | R | — | R | New Hampshire | D | — | R | R | — | R | R | — | R | R | — | R | R | — | R | R | — | D | New Hampshire | R | — | D | D | — | R | R | — | R | R | — | R | R | — | R | R | — | R | R | — | D | R | — | D | D | — | D | D | – | D |
| New Jersey | PA | PA | — | PA | PA | — | F | F | — | DR | DR | — | DR | DR | — | DR | DR | — | DR | DR | — | AJ | New Jersey | AJ | — | AJ | D | — | W | W | — | W | W | — | D | D | — | New Jersey | D | R | — | D | D | — | D | R | — | D | D | — | R | D | — | D | D | — | D | R | New Jersey | — | R | R | — | R | R | — | D | D | — | R | R | — | D | R | — | R | R | New Jersey | — | D | D | — | R | R | — | R | R | — | R | R | — | D | R | — | D | R | New Jersey | — | D | R | — | D | D | — | D | D | — | D | D | — | D | D | — | D | D | — | D | D | — | D | D | — | D | D | — | D | D |
| New Mexico | | | | | | | | | | | | | | | | | | | | | | | New Mexico | | | | | | | | | | | | | | | New Mexico | | | | | | | | | | | | | | | | | | | | | New Mexico | | | | | | | | | 2R | — | D | R | — | D | D | — | R | D | New Mexico | — | R | D | — | D | D | — | D | D | — | D | D | — | D | D | — | D | D | New Mexico | — | D | R | — | R | R | — | D | R | — | D | R | — | D | R | — | D | R | — | D | D | — | D | D | — | D | D | — | D | D |
| New York | PA | — | PA | AA | — | F | F | — | DR | DR | — | DR | DR | — | F | DR | — | F | DR | — | AJ | J | New York | — | D | D | — | D | D | — | D | W | — | W | W | — | R | New York | R | — | R | R | — | R | R | — | R | D | — | R | R | — | R | R | — | D | D | — | New York | R | R | — | R | R | — | R | D | — | R | R | — | R | D | — | D | D | — | New York | D | D | — | D | D | — | D | R | — | D | R | — | R | R | — | R | D | — | New York | R | C | — | R | D | — | R | D | — | R | D | — | R | D | — | D | D | — | D | D | — | D | D | — | D | D | — | D | D | – |
| North Carolina | — | PA | PA | — | AA | DR | — | DR | DR | — | DR | DR | — | DR | DR | — | DR | DR | — | DR | J | — | North Carolina | D | D | — | D | D | — | W | D | — | W | W | — | D | D | North Carolina | — | D | D | — | — | — | 2R | D | D | — | D | D | — | D | D | — | D | D | — | Po | North Carolina | R | — | D | D | — | D | D | — | D | D | — | D | D | — | D | D | — | D | North Carolina | D | — | D | D | — | D | D | — | D | D | — | D | D | — | D | D | — | D | North Carolina | D | — | R | D | — | R | R | — | R | D | — | R | R | — | R | D | — | R | R | — | D | R | — | R | R | — | R | R | – | D |
| North Dakota | | | | | | | | | | | | | | | | | | | | | | | North Dakota | | | | | | | | | | | | | | | North Dakota | | | | | | | | | | | | | | | | | 2R | R | D | — | North Dakota | R | R | — | R | R | — | R | R | — | R | R | — | R | R | — | R | R | — | North Dakota | R | R | — | R | R | — | D | R | — | R | R | — | R | R | — | R | D | — | North Dakota | R | D | — | R | D | — | R | D | — | D | D | — | D | D | — | D | D | — | D | D | — | R | D | — | R | R | — | R | R | – |
| Year → Class → Congress → | 1789 1 1st | 1789 2 1st | 1789 3 1st | 1790 1 2nd | 1792 2 3rd | 1794 3 4th | 1796 1 5th | 1798 2 6th | 1800 3 7th | 1802 1 8th | 1804 2 9th | 1806 3 10th | 1808 1 11th | 1810 2 12th | 1812 3 13th | 1814 1 14th | 1816 2 15th | 1818 3 16th | 1820 1 17th | 1822 2 18th | 1824 3 19th | 1826 1 20th | Year → Class → Congress → | 1828 2 21st | 1830 3 22nd | 1832 1 23rd | 1834 2 24th | 1836 3 25th | 1838 1 26th | 1840 2 27th | 1842 3 28th | 1844 1 29th | 1846 2 30th | 1848 3 31st | 1850 1 32nd | 1852 2 33rd | 1854 3 34th | Year → Class → Congress → | 1856 1 35th | 1858 2 36th | 1860 3 37th | 1862 1 38th | 1864 2 39th | 1866 3 40th | 1868 1 41st | 1870 2 42nd | 1872 3 43rd | 1874 1 44th | 1876 2 45th | 1878 3 46th | 1880 1 47th | 1882 2 48th | 1884 3 49th | 1886 1 50th | 1888 2 51st | 1890 3 52nd | 1892 1 53rd | 1894 2 54th | Year → Class → Congress → | 1896 3 55th | 1898 1 56th | 1900 2 57th | 1902 3 58th | 1904 1 59th | 1906 2 60th | 1908 3 61st | 1910 1 62nd | 1912 2 63rd | 1914 3 64th | 1916 1 65th | 1918 2 66th | 1920 3 67th | 1922 1 68th | 1924 2 69th | 1926 3 70th | 1928 1 71st | 1930 2 72nd | Year → Class → Congress → | 1932 3 73rd | 1934 1 74th | 1936 2 75th | 1938 3 76th | 1940 1 77th | 1942 2 78th | 1944 3 79th | 1946 1 80th | 1948 2 81st | 1950 3 82nd | 1952 1 83rd | 1954 2 84th | 1956 3 85th | 1958 1 86th | 1960 2 87th | 1962 3 88th | 1964 1 89th | 1966 2 90th | Year → Class → Congress → | 1968 3 91st | 1970 1 92nd | 1972 2 93rd | 1974 3 94th | 1976 1 95th | 1978 2 96th | 1980 3 97th | 1982 1 98th | 1984 2 99th | 1986 3 100th | 1988 1 101st | 1990 2 102nd | 1992 3 103rd | 1994 1 104th | 1996 2 105th | 1998 3 106th | 2000 1 107th | 2002 2 108th | 2004 3 109th | 2006 1 110th | 2008 2 111th | 2010 3 112th | 2012 1 113th | 2014 2 114th | 2016 3 115th | 2018 1 116th | 2020 2 117th | 2022 3 118th | 2024 1 119th | 2026 2 120th |
| Ohio | | | | | | | | | | 2DR | — | DR | DR | — | DR | DR | — | DR | DR | — | AJ | AJ | Ohio | — | AJ | D | — | D | D | — | D | W | — | FS | W | — | D | Ohio | R | — | R | R | — | R | D | — | R | D | — | D | R | — | D | R | — | D | R | — | Ohio | R | R | — | R | R | — | R | D | — | R | D | — | R | R | — | R | R | — | Ohio | D | D | — | R | R | — | R | R | — | R | R | — | D | D | — | D | D | — | Ohio | R | R | — | D | D | — | D | D | — | D | D | — | D | R | — | R | R | — | R | D | — | R | D | — | R | D | — | R | R | – |
| Oklahoma | | | | | | | | | | | | | | | | | | | | | | | Oklahoma | | | | | | | | | | | | | | | Oklahoma | | | | | | | | | | | | | | | | | | | | | Oklahoma | | | | | | 2D | D | — | D | D | — | D | R | — | R | D | — | D | Oklahoma | D | — | D | D | — | R | D | — | D | D | — | D | D | — | D | D | — | D | Oklahoma | R | — | R | R | — | D | R | — | D | R | — | D | R | — | R | R | — | R | R | — | R | R | — | R | R | — | R | R | – | R |
| Oregon | | | | | | | | | | | | | | | | | | | | | | | Oregon | | | | | | | | | | | | | | | Oregon | | 2D | R | — | R | R | — | D | R | — | D | D | — | R | R | — | R | R | — | R | Oregon | R | — | R | R | — | R | D | — | D | D | — | R | R | — | R | R | — | R | Oregon | R | — | R | R | — | R | R | — | R | R | — | D | D | — | D | D | — | R | Oregon | R | — | R | R | — | R | R | — | R | R | — | R | R | — | R | D | — | R | D | — | D | D | — | D | D | — | D | D | – | D |
| Pennsylvania | AA | — | PA | AA | — | F | F | — | DR | DR | — | DR | DR | — | DR | DR | — | DR | DR | — | AJ | J | Pennsylvania | — | D | D | — | D | D | — | D | D | — | W | D | — | D | Pennsylvania | R | — | R | D | — | R | R | — | R | D | — | R | R | — | R | R | — | R | R | — | Pennsylvania | R | R | — | R | R | — | R | R | — | R | R | — | R | R | — | R | R | — | Pennsylvania | R | D | — | R | D | — | D | R | — | R | R | — | D | R | — | D | R | — | Pennsylvania | R | R | — | R | R | — | R | R | — | R | R | — | R | R | — | R | R | — | R | D | — | R | D | — | R | D | — | D | R | – |
| Rhode Island | PA | AA | — | PA | PA | — | F | F | — | DR | DR | — | F | DR | — | F | F | — | DR | DR | — | AJ | Rhode Island | AJ | — | AJ | W | — | W | W | — | W | W | — | D | D | — | Rhode Island | R | R | — | R | R | — | R | R | — | R | R | — | R | R | — | R | R | — | R | R | Rhode Island | — | R | R | — | R | R | — | R | R | — | D | R | — | D | R | — | R | R | Rhode Island | — | D | D | — | D | D | — | D | D | — | D | D | — | D | D | — | D | D | Rhode Island | — | D | D | — | R | D | — | R | D | — | R | D | — | R | D | — | R | D | — | D | D | — | D | D | — | D | D | — | D | D |
| South Carolina | — | PA | PA | — | AA | F | — | DR | DR | — | DR | DR | — | DR | DR | — | DR | DR | — | DR | J | — | South Carolina | D | Nu | — | Nu | W | — | D | D | — | D | D | — | D | D | South Carolina | — | D | — | — | — | — | 2R | R | R | — | D | D | — | D | D | — | D | D | — | D | South Carolina | D | — | D | D | — | D | D | — | D | D | — | D | D | — | D | D | — | D | South Carolina | D | — | D | D | — | D | D | — | D | D | — | D | D | — | D | D | — | R | South Carolina | D | — | R | D | — | R | D | — | R | D | — | R | D | — | R | D | — | R | R | — | R | R | — | R | R | — | R | R | – | D |
| South Dakota | | | | | | | | | | | | | | | | | | | | | | | South Dakota | | | | | | | | | | | | | | | South Dakota | | | | | | | | | | | | | | | | | 2R | I | — | R | South Dakota | Po | — | R | R | — | R | R | — | R | D | — | R | R | — | R | R | — | D | South Dakota | R | — | D | R | — | R | R | — | R | R | — | R | R | — | R | D | — | R | South Dakota | D | — | D | D | — | R | R | — | R | D | — | R | D | — | D | D | — | D | R | — | D | R | — | R | R | — | R | R | – | R |
| Tennessee | | | | | | | 2DR | DR | — | DR | DR | — | DR | DR | — | DR | DR | — | DR | DR | — | J | Tennessee | D | — | D | W | — | D | W | — | D | W | — | W | W | — | Tennessee | D | D | — | — | — | Sp | R | D | — | D | D | — | D | D | — | D | D | — | D | D | Tennessee | — | D | D | — | D | D | — | D | D | — | D | D | — | D | D | — | D | D | Tennessee | — | D | D | — | D | D | — | D | D | — | D | D | — | D | D | — | D | R | Tennessee | — | R | R | — | D | R | — | D | D | — | D | D | — | R | R | — | R | R | — | R | R | — | R | R | — | R | R | — | R | R |
| Texas | | | | | | | | | | | | | | | | | | | | | | | Texas | | | | | | | | | | 2D | — | D | D | — | Texas | D | D | — | — | — | — | — | 2R | — | D | D | — | D | D | — | D | D | — | D | D | Texas | — | D | D | — | D | D | — | D | D | — | D | D | — | D | D | — | D | D | Texas | — | D | D | — | D | D | — | D | D | — | D | D | — | D | D | — | D | R | Texas | — | D | R | — | D | R | — | D | R | — | D | R | — | R | R | — | R | R | — | R | R | — | R | R | — | R | R | — | R | D |
| Utah | | | | | | | | | | | | | | | | | | | | | | | Utah | | | | | | | | | | | | | | | Utah | | | | | | | | | | | | | | | | | | | | | Utah | Sp | R | — | R | R | — | R | R | — | R | D | — | R | D | — | R | D | — | Utah | D | D | — | D | D | — | D | R | — | R | R | — | R | D | — | R | D | — | Utah | R | D | — | R | R | — | R | R | — | R | R | — | R | R | — | R | R | — | R | R | — | R | R | — | R | R | — | R | R | – |
| Vermont | | | | 2AA | — | F | F | — | F | DR | — | DR | DR | — | DR | F | — | DR | DR | — | AJ | AJ | Vermont | — | AJ | AJ | — | W | W | — | W | W | — | W | W | — | W | Vermont | R | — | R | R | — | R | R | — | R | R | — | R | R | — | R | R | — | R | R | — | Vermont | R | R | — | R | R | — | R | R | — | R | R | — | R | R | — | R | R | — | Vermont | R | R | — | R | R | — | R | R | — | R | R | — | R | R | — | R | R | — | Vermont | R | R | — | D | R | — | D | R | — | D | R | — | D | R | — | D | R | — | D | I | — | D | I | — | D | I | — | D | I | – |
| Virginia | AA | AA | — | AA | AA | — | DR | DR | — | DR | DR | — | DR | DR | — | DR | DR | — | DR | DR | — | J | Virginia | D | — | AJ | W | — | W | W | — | D | D | — | D | D | — | Virginia | D | D | — | U | N | — | — | Sp | — | D | D | — | Ra | Ra | — | D | D | — | D | D | Virginia | — | D | D | — | D | D | — | D | D | — | D | D | — | D | D | — | D | D | Virginia | — | D | D | — | D | D | — | D | D | — | D | D | — | D | D | — | D | D | Virginia | — | I | R | — | I | R | — | R | R | — | D | R | — | D | R | — | R | R | — | D | D | — | D | D | — | D | D | — | D | D |
| Washington | | | | | | | | | | | | | | | | | | | | | | | Washington | | | | | | | | | | | | | | | Washington | | | | | | | | | | | | | | | | | 2R | R | R | — | Washington | R | R | — | R | R | — | R | R | — | R | R | — | R | D | — | R | D | — | Washington | D | D | — | D | D | — | D | R | — | D | D | — | D | D | — | D | D | — | Washington | D | D | — | D | D | — | R | D | — | D | R | — | D | R | — | D | D | — | D | D | — | D | D | — | D | D | — | D | D | – |
| West Virginia | | | | | | | | | | | | | | | | | | | | | | | West Virginia | | | | | | | | | | | | | | | West Virginia | | | | 2U | R | — | R | D | — | D | D | — | D | D | — | D | D | — | D | R | West Virginia | — | R | R | — | R | R | — | D | R | — | R | R | — | D | R | — | R | D | West Virginia | — | D | D | — | D | R | — | D | D | — | D | D | — | D | D | — | D | D | West Virginia | — | D | D | — | D | D | — | D | D | — | D | D | — | D | D | — | D | D | — | D | D | — | D | R | — | D | R | — | R | R |
| Wisconsin | | | | | | | | | | | | | | | | | | | | | | | Wisconsin | | | | | | | | | | | 2D | D | — | R | Wisconsin | R | — | R | R | — | R | R | — | R | R | — | R | R | — | R | R | — | D | D | — | Wisconsin | R | R | — | R | R | — | R | R | — | D | R | — | R | R | — | R | R | — | Wisconsin | D | Pr | — | R | R | — | R | R | — | R | R | — | R | D | — | D | D | — | Wisconsin | D | D | — | D | D | — | R | D | — | R | D | — | D | D | — | D | D | — | D | D | — | R | D | — | R | D | — | R | D | – |
| Wyoming | | | | | | | | | | | | | | | | | | | | | | | Wyoming | | | | | | | | | | | | | | | Wyoming | | | | | | | | | | | | | | | | | | 2R | R | R | Wyoming | — | R | R | — | R | R | — | R | R | — | D | R | — | D | R | — | D | R | Wyoming | — | D | D | — | D | R | — | D | D | — | R | D | — | D | R | — | D | R | Wyoming | — | D | R | — | R | R | — | R | R | — | R | R | — | R | R | — | R | R | — | R | R | — | R | R | — | R | R | — | R | R |
| Year → Class → Congress → | 1789 1 1st | 1789 2 1st | 1789 3 1st | 1790 1 2nd | 1792 2 3rd | 1794 3 4th | 1796 1 5th | 1798 2 6th | 1800 3 7th | 1802 1 8th | 1804 2 9th | 1806 3 10th | 1808 1 11th | 1810 2 12th | 1812 3 13th | 1814 1 14th | 1816 2 15th | 1818 3 16th | 1820 1 17th | 1822 2 18th | 1824 3 19th | 1826 1 20th | Year → Class → Congress → | 1828 2 21st | 1830 3 22nd | 1832 1 23rd | 1834 2 24th | 1836 3 25th | 1838 1 26th | 1840 2 27th | 1842 3 28th | 1844 1 29th | 1846 2 30th | 1848 3 31st | 1850 1 32nd | 1852 2 33rd | 1854 3 34th | Year → Class → Congress → | 1856 1 35th | 1858 2 36th | 1860 3 37th | 1862 1 38th | 1864 2 39th | 1866 3 40th | 1868 1 41st | 1870 2 42nd | 1872 3 43rd | 1874 1 44th | 1876 2 45th | 1878 3 46th | 1880 1 47th | 1882 2 48th | 1884 3 49th | 1886 1 50th | 1888 2 51st | 1890 3 52nd | 1892 1 53rd | 1894 2 54th | Year → Class → Congress → | 1896 3 55th | 1898 1 56th | 1900 2 57th | 1902 3 58th | 1904 1 59th | 1906 2 60th | 1908 3 61st | 1910 1 62nd | 1912 2 63rd | 1914 3 64th | 1916 1 65th | 1918 2 66th | 1920 3 67th | 1922 1 68th | 1924 2 69th | 1926 3 70th | 1928 1 71st | 1930 2 72nd | Year → Class → Congress → | 1932 3 73rd | 1934 1 74th | 1936 2 75th | 1938 3 76th | 1940 1 77th | 1942 2 78th | 1944 3 79th | 1946 1 80th | 1948 2 81st | 1950 3 82nd | 1952 1 83rd | 1954 2 84th | 1956 3 85th | 1958 1 86th | 1960 2 87th | 1962 3 88th | 1964 1 89th | 1966 2 90th | Year → Class → Congress → | 1968 3 91st | 1970 1 92nd | 1972 2 93rd | 1974 3 94th | 1976 1 95th | 1978 2 96th | 1980 3 97th | 1982 1 98th | 1984 2 99th | 1986 3 100th | 1988 1 101st | 1990 2 102nd | 1992 3 103rd | 1994 1 104th | 1996 2 105th | 1998 3 106th | 2000 1 107th | 2002 2 108th | 2004 3 109th | 2006 1 110th | 2008 2 111th | 2010 3 112th | 2012 1 113th | 2014 2 114th | 2016 3 115th | 2018 1 116th | 2020 2 117th | 2022 3 118th | 2024 1 119th | 2026 2 120th |
| | | | | | | First Party System | | | | | | | | | | | | | | | | | | Second Party System | | | | | | | | | | | | | | | Third Party System | | | | | | | | | | | | | | | | | | | | | Fourth Party System | | | | | | | | | | | | | | | | | | | Fifth Party System | | | | | | | | | | | | | | | | | | | Sixth Party System | | | | | | | | | | | | | | | | | | | | | | | | | | | | | |

== Analytical tables ==
Last updated after the 2014 elections.

=== Results ===
| | First Party System | | | Second Party System | | | | Third Party System | | | | Fourth Party System | | | | | Fifth Party System | | | | Sixth Party System | | | | Overall since 1828 | | | |
| State | DR votes | F votes | % DR | D votes | AJ/W votes | Other votes | % D | D votes | R votes | Other votes | % D | D votes | R votes | Other votes | % D | State | D votes | R votes | Other votes | % D | D votes | R votes | Other votes | % D | D votes | R votes | Other votes | % D |
|---|---|---|---|---|---|---|---|---|---|---|---|---|---|---|---|---|---|---|---|---|---|---|---|---|---|---|---|---|
| Alabama | 3 | 0 | 100 | 10 | 0 | 0 | 100 | 9 | 3 | 0 | 75 | 12 | 0 | 0 | 100 | Alabama | 12 | 0 | 0 | 100 | 8 | 8 | 0 | 50 | 51 | 11 | 0 | 82 |
| Alaska | | | | | | | | | | | | | | | | Alaska | 5 | 0 | 0 | 100 | 3 | 13 | 0 | 19 | 8 | 13 | 0 | 38 |
| Arizona | | | | | | | | | | | | 7 | 1 | 0 | 88 | Arizona | 9 | 3 | 0 | 75 | 3 | 13 | 0 | 19 | 19 | 17 | 0 | 53 |
| Arkansas | | | | 8 | 0 | 0 | 100 | 9 | 4 | 0 | 69 | 12 | 0 | 0 | 100 | Arkansas | 12 | 0 | 0 | 100 | 13 | 3 | 0 | 81 | 54 | 7 | 0 | 89 |
| California | | | | 3 | 0 | 0 | 100 | 6 | 6 | 1 | 46 | 1 | 11 | 0 | 8 | California | 4 | 8 | 0 | 33 | 13 | 3 | 0 | 81 | 27 | 28 | 1 | 48 |
| Colorado | | | | | | | | 0 | 7 | 1 | 0 | 7 | 5 | 0 | 58 | Colorado | 6 | 6 | 0 | 50 | 7 | 9 | 0 | 44 | 20 | 27 | 1 | 42 |
| Connecticut | 2 | 8 | 20 | 3 | 5 | 1 | 33 | 1 | 11 | 1 | 8 | 0 | 12 | 0 | 0 | Connecticut | 8 | 4 | 0 | 67 | 13 | 3 | 0 | 81 | 24 | 31 | 7 | 39 |
| Delaware | 0 | 10 | 0 | 1 | 8 | 0 | 11 | 13 | 1 | 0 | 93 | 3 | 9 | 0 | 25 | Delaware | 4 | 8 | 0 | 33 | 11 | 5 | 0 | 69 | 32 | 31 | 8 | 45 |
| Florida | | | | 4 | 1 | 0 | 80 | 8 | 3 | 0 | 73 | 12 | 0 | 0 | 100 | Florida | 12 | 0 | 0 | 100 | 10 | 6 | 0 | 63 | 46 | 9 | 1 | 82 |
| Georgia | 9 | 1 | 90 | 7 | 3 | 0 | 70 | 10 | 1 | 0 | 91 | 12 | 0 | 0 | 100 | Georgia | 12 | 0 | 0 | 100 | 8 | 8 | 0 | 50 | 49 | 9 | 3 | 80 |
| Hawaii | | | | | | | | | | | | | | | | Hawaii | 2 | 3 | 0 | 40 | 15 | 1 | 0 | 94 | 17 | 4 | 0 | 81 |
| Idaho | | | | | | | | 0 | 3 | 0 | 0 | 0 | 10 | 2 | 0 | Idaho | 6 | 6 | 0 | 50 | 2 | 14 | 0 | 13 | 8 | 33 | 2 | 19 |
| Illinois | 3 | 0 | 100 | 10 | 0 | 0 | 100 | 2 | 10 | 1 | 15 | 2 | 10 | 0 | 17 | Illinois | 7 | 5 | 0 | 58 | 11 | 5 | 0 | 69 | 32 | 30 | 1 | 51 |
| Indiana | 4 | 0 | 100 | 6 | 3 | 0 | 67 | 8 | 5 | 0 | 62 | 4 | 8 | 0 | 33 | Indiana | 6 | 6 | 0 | 50 | 6 | 10 | 0 | 38 | 30 | 29 | 3 | 48 |
| Iowa | | | | 3 | 0 | 1 | 75 | 0 | 13 | 0 | 0 | 0 | 12 | 0 | 0 | Iowa | 4 | 8 | 0 | 33 | 8 | 8 | 0 | 50 | 15 | 41 | 1 | 26 |
| Kansas | | | | | | | | 0 | 12 | 1 | 0 | 1 | 10 | 1 | 8 | Kansas | 1 | 11 | 0 | 8 | 0 | 16 | 0 | 0 | 2 | 49 | 2 | 4 |
| Kentucky | 9 | 1 | 90 | 1 | 9 | 0 | 10 | 13 | 0 | 0 | 100 | 8 | 4 | 0 | 67 | Kentucky | 8 | 4 | 0 | 67 | 6 | 10 | 0 | 38 | 36 | 28 | 9 | 49 |
| Louisiana | 5 | 0 | 100 | 7 | 3 | 0 | 70 | 8 | 4 | 0 | 67 | 12 | 0 | 0 | 100 | Louisiana | 12 | 0 | 0 | 100 | 13 | 3 | 0 | 81 | 52 | 7 | 3 | 84 |
| Maine | 3 | 0 | 100 | 6 | 3 | 0 | 66 | 1 | 13 | 0 | 7 | 1 | 11 | 0 | 8 | Maine | 2 | 10 | 0 | 17 | 5 | 10 | 1 | 31 | 15 | 44 | 4 | 24 |
| Maryland | 6 | 4 | 60 | 0 | 9 | 0 | 0 | 11 | 0 | 2 | 85 | 7 | 5 | 0 | 58 | Maryland | 8 | 4 | 0 | 67 | 12 | 4 | 0 | 75 | 38 | 13 | 11 | 61 |
| Massachusetts | 1 | 9 | 10 | 0 | 8 | 1 | 0 | 0 | 14 | 0 | 0 | 3 | 9 | 0 | 25 | Massachusetts | 5 | 7 | 0 | 42 | 15 | 1 | 0 | 94 | 23 | 31 | 9 | 37 |
| Michigan | | | | 6 | 1 | 0 | 86 | 0 | 14 | 0 | 0 | 1 | 11 | 0 | 8 | Michigan | 5 | 7 | 0 | 42 | 14 | 2 | 0 | 88 | 26 | 34 | 1 | 43 |
| Minnesota | | | | | | | | 1 | 13 | 0 | 7 | 0 | 10 | 2 | 0 | Minnesota | 6 | 4 | 2 | 50 | 10 | 6 | 0 | 63 | 17 | 33 | 4 | 31 |
| Mississippi | 4 | 0 | 100 | 7 | 2 | 0 | 78 | 9 | 3 | 0 | 75 | 12 | 0 | 0 | 100 | Mississippi | 12 | 0 | 0 | 100 | 4 | 12 | 0 | 25 | 44 | 15 | 2 | 72 |
| Missouri | 2 | 0 | 100 | 8 | 1 | 0 | 89 | 10 | 2 | 1 | 77 | 9 | 3 | 0 | 75 | Missouri | 10 | 2 | 0 | 83 | 6 | 10 | 0 | 38 | 43 | 17 | 2 | 69 |
| Montana | | | | | | | | 0 | 4 | 0 | 0 | 10 | 2 | 0 | 83 | Montana | 11 | 1 | 0 | 92 | 12 | 4 | 0 | 75 | 33 | 11 | 0 | 75 |
| Nebraska | | | | | | | | 0 | 11 | 1 | 0 | 2 | 10 | 0 | 17 | Nebraska | 1 | 10 | 1 | 8 | 10 | 6 | 0 | 63 | 13 | 37 | 2 | 25 |
| Nevada | | | | | | | | 1 | 10 | 1 | 8 | 6 | 4 | 2 | 50 | Nevada | 10 | 2 | 0 | 83 | 10 | 6 | 0 | 63 | 27 | 22 | 3 | 52 |
| New Hampshire | 7 | 3 | 70 | 7 | 1 | 2 | 70 | 0 | 13 | 0 | 0 | 1 | 11 | 0 | 8 | New Hampshire | 2 | 10 | 0 | 17 | 4 | 12 | 0 | 25 | 14 | 47 | 2 | 22 |
| New Jersey | 8 | 2 | 80 | 3 | 6 | 0 | 33 | 10 | 4 | 0 | 71 | 3 | 9 | 0 | 25 | New Jersey | 4 | 8 | 0 | 33 | 15 | 1 | 0 | 94 | 35 | 22 | 6 | 56 |
| New Mexico | | | | | | | | | | | | 4 | 4 | 0 | 50 | New Mexico | 11 | 1 | 0 | 92 | 9 | 7 | 0 | 56 | 24 | 12 | 0 | 67 |
| New York | 6 | 4 | 60 | 5 | 3 | 1 | 63 | 3 | 10 | 0 | 23 | 4 | 8 | 0 | 33 | New York | 7 | 5 | 0 | 58 | 10 | 5 | 1 | 63 | 29 | 29 | 4 | 47 |
| North Carolina | 10 | 0 | 100 | 7 | 3 | 0 | 70 | 10 | 2 | 1 | 77 | 11 | 1 | 0 | 92 | North Carolina | 12 | 0 | 0 | 100 | 5 | 11 | 0 | 31 | 45 | 14 | 4 | 71 |
| North Dakota | | | | | | | | 1 | 3 | 0 | 25 | 0 | 12 | 0 | 0 | North Dakota | 2 | 10 | 0 | 17 | 12 | 4 | 0 | 75 | 15 | 29 | 0 | 34 |
| Ohio | 8 | 0 | 100 | 5 | 3 | 1 | 56 | 5 | 8 | 0 | 38 | 2 | 10 | 0 | 17 | Ohio | 6 | 6 | 0 | 50 | 9 | 7 | 0 | 56 | 27 | 31 | 4 | 44 |
| Oklahoma | | | | | | | | | | | | 8 | 2 | 0 | 80 | Oklahoma | 11 | 1 | 0 | 92 | 3 | 13 | 0 | 19 | 22 | 16 | 0 | 58 |
| Oregon | | | | | | | | 5 | 9 | 0 | 31 | 3 | 9 | 0 | 25 | Oregon | 4 | 8 | 0 | 33 | 5 | 11 | 0 | 31 | 17 | 37 | 0 | 31 |
| Pennsylvania | 8 | 2 | 80 | 8 | 1 | 0 | 89 | 2 | 11 | 0 | 15 | 0 | 12 | 0 | 0 | Pennsylvania | 5 | 7 | 0 | 42 | 2 | 14 | 0 | 13 | 17 | 44 | 1 | 27 |
| Rhode Island | 5 | 5 | 50 | 2 | 7 | 0 | 22 | 0 | 14 | 0 | 0 | 2 | 10 | 0 | 17 | Rhode Island | 12 | 0 | 0 | 100 | 11 | 5 | 0 | 69 | 27 | 29 | 7 | 43 |
| South Carolina | 9 | 1 | 90 | 7 | 1 | 2 | 70 | 8 | 4 | 0 | 66 | 12 | 0 | 0 | 100 | South Carolina | 11 | 1 | 0 | 92 | 6 | 10 | 0 | 38 | 44 | 15 | 3 | 71 |
| South Dakota | | | | | | | | 0 | 3 | 1 | 0 | 2 | 9 | 1 | 17 | South Dakota | 2 | 10 | 0 | 17 | 9 | 7 | 0 | 56 | 13 | 29 | 2 | 30 |
| Tennessee | 11 | 0 | 100 | 4 | 5 | 0 | 44 | 12 | 2 | 0 | 86 | 12 | 0 | 0 | 100 | Tennessee | 11 | 1 | 0 | 92 | 5 | 11 | 0 | 31 | 44 | 14 | 5 | 70 |
| Texas | | | | 4 | 0 | 0 | 100 | 10 | 2 | 0 | 83 | 12 | 0 | 0 | 100 | Texas | 11 | 1 | 0 | 92 | 4 | 12 | 0 | 25 | 39 | 15 | 0 | 72 |
| Utah | | | | | | | | | | | | 4 | 9 | 0 | 31 | Utah | 7 | 5 | 0 | 58 | 1 | 15 | 0 | 6 | 12 | 29 | 0 | 29 |
| Vermont | 6 | 4 | 60 | 0 | 9 | 0 | 0 | 0 | 13 | 0 | 0 | 0 | 12 | 0 | 0 | Vermont | 0 | 12 | 0 | 0 | 7 | 7 | 2 | 44 | 7 | 44 | 11 | 11 |
| Virginia | 10 | 0 | 100 | 5 | 4 | 0 | 56 | 9 | 1 | 3 | 69 | 12 | 0 | 0 | 100 | Virginia | 12 | 0 | 0 | 100 | 6 | 8 | 2 | 38 | 44 | 9 | 9 | 71 |
| Washington | | | | | | | | 0 | 4 | 0 | 0 | 2 | 10 | 0 | 17 | Washington | 11 | 1 | 0 | 92 | 13 | 3 | 0 | 81 | 26 | 18 | 0 | 59 |
| West Virginia | | | | | | | | 8 | 3 | 2 | 62 | 3 | 9 | 0 | 25 | West Virginia | 11 | 1 | 0 | 92 | 15 | 1 | 0 | 94 | 37 | 14 | 2 | 70 |
| Wisconsin | | | | 3 | 0 | 1 | 75 | 2 | 11 | 0 | 15 | 1 | 11 | 0 | 8 | Wisconsin | 4 | 7 | 1 | 33 | 13 | 3 | 0 | 81 | 23 | 33 | 1 | 40 |
| Wyoming | | | | | | | | 0 | 4 | 0 | 0 | 3 | 9 | 0 | 25 | Wyoming | 8 | 4 | 0 | 67 | 1 | 15 | 0 | 6 | 12 | 32 | 0 | 27 |
| Northeast | 46 | 37 | 55 | 34 | 43 | 5 | 41 | 17 | 103 | 1 | 14 | 14 | 94 | 0 | 13 | Northeast | 45 | 63 | 0 | 42 | 82 | 56 | 4 | 58 | 191 | 319 | 51 | 34 |
| South | 76 | 17 | 82 | 72 | 48 | 2 | 59 | 147 | 33 | 6 | 79 | 160 | 30 | 0 | 84 | South | 171 | 21 | 0 | 89 | 129 | 123 | 2 | 51 | 679 | 217 | 58 | 71 |
| Midwest | 17 | 0 | 100 | 41 | 8 | 3 | 79 | 29 | 94 | 5 | 23 | 22 | 116 | 4 | 15 | Midwest | 58 | 84 | 4 | 40 | 108 | 85 | 0 | 56 | 258 | 380 | 23 | 39 |
| West | | | | 3 | 0 | 0 | 100 | 12 | 47 | 3 | 19 | 47 | 74 | 4 | 38 | West | 95 | 48 | 0 | 66 | 94 | 114 | 0 | 45 | 251 | 283 | 7 | 46 |
| United States | 139 | 54 | 72 | 150 | 95 | 10 | 59 | 205 | 277 | 15 | 41 | 143 | 314 | 8 | 31 | United States | 369 | 216 | 4 | 63 | 412 | 378 | 7 | 52 | 1378 | 1199 | 140 | 51 |
| State | DR votes | F votes | % DR | D votes | AJ/W votes | Other votes | % D | D votes | R votes | Other votes | % D | D votes | R votes | Other votes | % D | State | D votes | R votes | Other votes | % D | D votes | R votes | Other votes | % D | D votes | R votes | Other votes | % D |
| | First Party System | | | Second Party System | | | | Third Party System | | | | Fourth Party System | | | | | Fifth Party System | | | | Sixth Party System | | | | Overall since 1828 | | | |

=== States across party systems ===
S indicates that a state was split between the two major parties and did not elect either party more than 60 percent of the time. A * sign indicates that a state elected that party at least 80 percent of the time. No * sign indicates that the state elected that party between 60 and 80 percent of the time.

| | Party systems | | | | | | | | |
| State | 1789-1792 | 1st | 1824-1826 | 2nd | 3rd | 4th | 5th | 6th | 2000-2014 |
|---|---|---|---|---|---|---|---|---|---|
| Alabama | — | DR* | J | D* | D | D* | D* | S | R* |
| Alaska | — | — | — | — | — | — | D* | R* | R* |
| Arizona | — | — | — | — | — | D* | D | R* | R* |
| Arkansas | — | — | — | D* | D | D* | D* | D* | D |
| California | — | — | — | — | S | R* | R | D* | D* |
| Colorado | — | — | — | — | R* | S | S | S | D |
| Connecticut | PA* | F* | AJ | W | R* | R* | D | D* | D* |
| Delaware | PA | F* | J | W* | D* | R | R | D | D* |
| Florida | — | — | — | D* | D | D* | D* | D | D |
| Georgia | AA* | DR* | J | D | D* | D* | D* | S | R* |
| Hawaii | — | — | — | — | — | — | R | D* | D* |
| Idaho | — | — | — | — | R* | R* | S | R* | R* |
| Illinois | — | DR* | J | D* | R | R* | S | D | D* |
| Indiana | — | DR* | AJ | D | D | R | S | R | R |
| Iowa | — | — | — | D | R* | R* | R | S | R |
| Kansas | — | — | — | — | R* | R* | R* | R* | R* |
| Kentucky | AA* | DR* | J | W* | D* | D | D | R | R* |
| Louisiana | — | DR* | AJ | D | D | D* | D* | D* | R |
| Maine | — | DR* | J | D | R* | R* | R* | R | R* |
| Maryland | PA* | DR | J | W* | D* | S | D | D | D* |
| Massachusetts | PA* | F* | AJ | W* | R* | R | S | D* | D* |
| Michigan | — | — | — | D* | R* | R* | S | D* | D* |
| Minnesota | — | — | — | — | R* | R* | S | D | D* |
| Mississippi | — | DR* | J | D | D | D* | D* | R | R* |
| Missouri | — | DR* | S | D* | D | D | D* | R | R |
| Montana | — | — | — | — | R* | D* | D* | D | D |
| Nebraska | — | — | — | — | R* | R* | R* | D | S |
| Nevada | — | — | — | — | R* | S | D* | D | R |
| New Hampshire | AA | DR | J | D | R* | R* | R* | R | R |
| New Jersey | S | DR* | AJ | W | D | R | R | D* | D* |
| New Mexico | — | — | — | — | — | S | D* | S | D* |
| New York | AA | DR | J | D | R | R | S | D | D* |
| North Carolina | PA | DR* | J | D | D | D* | D* | R | R* |
| North Dakota | — | — | — | — | R | R* | R* | D | D* |
| Ohio | — | DR* | AJ | S | R | R* | S | S | R |
| Oklahoma | — | — | — | — | — | D* | D* | R* | R* |
| Oregon | — | — | — | — | R | R | R | R | D* |
| Pennsylvania | AA | DR* | S | D* | R* | R* | S | R* | R |
| Rhode Island | PA | S | AJ | W | R* | R* | D* | D | D* |
| South Carolina | PA | DR* | J | D | D | D* | D* | R | R* |
| South Dakota | — | — | — | — | R | R* | R* | S | R |
| Tennessee | — | DR* | J | S | D* | D* | D* | R | R* |
| Texas | — | — | — | D* | D* | D* | D* | R | R* |
| Utah | — | — | — | — | — | R | S | R* | R* |
| Vermont | AA* | DR | AJ | W* | R* | R* | R* | S | S |
| Virginia | AA* | DR* | J | S | D | D* | D* | S | D |
| Washington | — | — | — | — | R* | R* | D* | D* | D* |
| West Virginia | — | — | — | — | D | R | D* | D* | D* |
| Wisconsin | — | — | — | D | R* | R* | S | D* | D* |
| Wyoming | — | — | — | — | R* | R | D | R* | R* |
| State | 1789-1792 | 1st | 1824-1826 | 2nd | 3rd | 4th | 5th | 6th | 2000- 2014 |

| Region | 1789-1792 | 1st | 1824-1826 | 2nd | 3rd | 4th | 5th | 6th | 2000-2014 |
|---|---|---|---|---|---|---|---|---|---|
| Northeast | PA | S | AJ | S | R* | R* | S | S | D |
| South | S | DR* | J* | S | D | D* | D* | S | R |
| Midwest | — | DR* | AJ | D | R | R* | S | S | S |
| West | — | — | — | D* | R | S | D | S | S |
| United States | S | DR | S | S | S | R | D | S | S |

== See also ==
- List of United States presidential election results by state
- Party divisions of United States Congresses
- List of special elections to the United States Senate
- List of United States Senate election results by region
