= 1792–93 United States Senate elections =

- Dates vary by state
- Class 2

10 of the 30 seats in the United States Senate (as well as special elections) 16 seats needed for a majority
	Majority party	Minority party
Party	Pro-Administration	Anti-Administration
Last election	16 seats	9
Seats before	17	10
Seats after	18	11
Seat change	▲1	▲1
Seats up	4	6
Races won	5	5
- Results: Pro-Administration hold Pro-Administration gain Anti-Administration hold Anti-Administration gain
Majority Faction before election
Pro-Administration
Elected Majority Faction
Pro-Administration

The 1792–93 United States Senate elections were held on various dates in various states, coinciding with President George Washington's unanimous re-election. As these U.S. Senate elections were prior to the ratification of the Seventeenth Amendment in 1913, senators were chosen by state legislatures. Senators were elected over a wide range of time throughout 1792 and 1793, and a seat may have been filled months late or remained vacant due to legislative deadlock. In these elections, terms were up for the ten senators in Class 2.

Formal organized political parties had yet to form in the United States, but two political factions were present: The coalition of Senators who supported George Washington's administration were known as the Pro-Administration Party, and the Senators against him as the Anti-Administration Party.

== Results summary ==
Senate party division, 3rd Congress (1793–1795)

- Majority party: Pro-Administration Party (16)
- Minority party: Anti-Administration Party (13)
- Other parties: 0
- Total seats: 30
- Vacant: 1 (later filled by Pro-Administration)

== Change in composition ==
Note: There were no political parties in this Congress. Members are informally grouped into factions of similar interest, based on an analysis of their voting record.

Virginia's elections are considered a single race here.

=== Before the elections ===
After the June 1792 admission of Kentucky.

A_{5}	A_{4}	A_{3}	A_{2}	A_{1}					
A_{6}	A_{7} Ga. Ran	A_{8} Ky. Ran	A_{9} N.H. Ran	A_{10} R.I. Unknown	A_{11} S.C. Ran	A_{12} Va. Resigned/Ran	V_{1} Pa.	P_{15} N.C. Ran	P_{17} N.J. Retired
Majority →									P_{17} N.J. Retired
P_{6}	P_{7}	P_{8}	P_{9}	P_{10}	P_{11}	P_{12}	P_{16} Del. Unknown	P_{13} Md. (sp); Resigned	P_{14} Mass. Ran
P_{5}	P_{4}	P_{3}	P_{2}	P_{1}					

=== Results of the election ===
A_{5}	A_{4}	A_{3}	A_{2}	A_{1}					
A_{6}	A_{7} Ga. Hold	A_{8} Ky. Re-elected	A_{9} N.C. Gain	A_{10} S.C. Re-elected	A_{11} Va. Ran/Re-elected	V_{1} Pa.	P_{18} R.I. Gain	P_{16} N.J. Hold	P_{17} N.H. Gain
Majority →									P_{17} N.H. Gain
P_{6}	P_{7}	P_{8}	P_{9}	P_{10}	P_{11}	P_{12}	P_{15} Del. Hold	P_{13} Md. (sp); Hold	P_{14} Mass. Re-elected
P_{5}	P_{4}	P_{3}	P_{2}	P_{1}					

=== Beginning of the next Congress ===
Two Pro-Administration senators (Benjamin Hawkins of North Carolina and John Langdon of New Hampshire) changed to Anti-Administration.

The vacant seat in Pennsylvania was filled February 28, 1793 by an Anti-Administration senator.

A_{5}	A_{4}	A_{3}	A_{2}	A_{1}					
A_{6}	A_{7}	A_{8}	A_{9}	A_{10}	A_{11}	A_{12} N.H. (cl. 1); Changed	A_{13} N.C. (cl. 3); Changed	A_{14} Pa. Late	P_{16}
Majority →									P_{16}
P_{6}	P_{7}	P_{8}	P_{9}	P_{10}	P_{11}	P_{12}	P_{13}	P_{14}	P_{15}
P_{5}	P_{4}	P_{3}	P_{2}	P_{1}					

Key:

A_{#}	Anti-Administration
P_{#}	Pro-Administration
V_{#}	Vacant

== Race summaries ==
=== Elections during the 2nd Congress ===
In these elections, the winner was seated before March 4, 1793; ordered by election date.

State	Incumbent			Results	Candidates
State	Senator	Party	First elected	Results	Candidates
Kentucky (Class 2)	None (new state)			Kentucky was admitted to the Union June 1, 1792. Winner elected June 18, 1792. Anti-Administration gain.	▌ ✓ John Brown (Anti-Admin.) 100%
Kentucky (Class 3)	None (new state)			Kentucky was admitted to the Union June 1, 1792. Winner elected June 18, 1792. Anti-Administration gain.	▌ ✓ John Edwards (Anti-Admin.); [data missing]
Virginia (Class 2)	Richard Henry Lee	Anti-Administration	1788	Incumbent resigned October 8, 1792. Winner elected October 18, 1792. Anti-Administration hold.	▌ ✓ John Taylor (Anti-Admin.) 55.56% (90 votes); ▌Arthur Lee (Unknown) 24.07% (39 votes); ▌Francis Corbin (Unknown) 20.37% (33 votes)
Maryland (Class 1)	Charles Carroll	Pro-Administration	1788	Incumbent resigned November 30, 1792. Winner elected January 10, 1793. Pro-Administration hold.	▌ ✓ Richard Potts (Pro-Admin.); [data missing]
Pennsylvania (Class 1)	Vacant			Legislature failed to elect in 1791–1792, leaving the seat vacant. Winner elected February 28, 1793. Anti-Administration gain.	▌ ✓ Albert Gallatin (Anti-Admin.) 54.88% (45 votes); ▌Henry Miller (Pro-Admin.) 42.68% (35 votes); ▌Arthur St. Clair (Anti-Admin.) 1.22% (1 vote); ▌William Irvine (Anti-Admin.) 1.22% (1 vote)

=== Races leading to the 3rd Congress ===
In these regular elections, the winner was seated on March 4, 1793; ordered by state.

All of the elections involved the Class 2 seats.

State	Incumbent			Results	Candidates
State	Senator	Party	First elected	Results	Candidates
Delaware	Richard Bassett	Pro-Administration	1788	Incumbent retired or lost re-election. Winner elected in 1793. Pro-Administration hold.	▌ ✓ John Vining (Pro-Admin.); [data missing]
Georgia	William Few	Anti-Administration	1789	Incumbent lost re-election. Winner elected in 1793. Anti-Administration hold.	▌ ✓ James Jackson (Anti-Admin.) 85.37% (35 votes); ▌William Few (Unknown) 12.20% (5 votes); ▌George Mathews (Unknown) 2.44% (1 vote)
Kentucky	John Brown	Anti-Administration	1792 (new state)	Incumbent re-elected December 11, 1792.	▌ ✓ John Brown (Anti-Admin.); Unopposed
Massachusetts	Caleb Strong	Pro-Administration	1788	Incumbent re-elected in 1793.	▌ ✓ Caleb Strong (Pro-Admin.); [data missing]
New Hampshire	Paine Wingate	Anti-Administration	1788	Incumbent lost re-election in 1792. Pro-Administration gain.	▌ ✓ Samuel Livermore (Pro-Admin.) 58.43% (52 votes); ▌Paine Wingate (Federalist) 31.46% (28 votes); ▌Nathaniel Peabody (Unknown) 8.99% (8 votes); ▌Abiel Foster (Federalist) 1.12% (1 vote)
New Jersey	Philemon Dickinson	Pro-Administration	1790 (special)	Incumbent retired. Winner's election date unknown. Pro-Administration hold.	▌ ✓ Frederick Frelinghuysen (Pro-Admin.); [data missing]
North Carolina	Samuel Johnston	Pro-Administration	1789	Incumbent lost re-election. Winner elected in 1792. Anti-Administration gain.	▌ ✓ Alexander Martin (Anti-Admin.) 24.71% (42 votes); ▌John Leigh (Unknown) 20.00% (34 votes); ▌Thomas Blount (Unknown) 18.24% (31 votes); ▌John Steele (Unknown) 18.24% (31 votes); ▌Gaiter (Unknown) 16.47% (28 votes); ▌Samuel Johnston (Pro-Admin.) 0.59% (1 vote); ▌William Lenoir (Unknown) 0.59% (1 vote); ▌Alfred Moore (Unknown) 0.59% (1 vote); ▌Richard Dobbs Spaight (Unknown) 0.59% (1 vote); ▌Willie Jones (Unknown) 0.00% (0 votes)
Rhode Island	Joseph Stanton Jr.	Anti-Administration	1790	Unknown if incumbent retired or lost re-election. Winner elected in 1793. Pro-Administration gain.	▌ ✓ William Bradford (Pro-Admin.); [data missing]
South Carolina	Pierce Butler	Anti-Administration	1789	Incumbent re-elected December 5, 1792.	▌ ✓ Pierce Butler (Anti-Admin.) 88.06% (118 votes); ▌Charles Pinckney (Unknown) 5.97% (8 votes); ▌Zachariah Horskins (Unknown) 1.49% (2 votes); ▌John Little Ward (Unknown) 1.49% (2 votes); ▌John Baxter (Unknown) 0.75% (1 vote); ▌John E. Colhoun (Unknown) 0.75% (1 vote); ▌Adam C. Jones (Unknown) 0.75% (1 vote); ▌Jacob Read (Federalist) 0.75% (1 vote)
Virginia	John Taylor	Anti-Administration	1792 (special)	Incumbent re-elected in 1793.	▌ ✓ John Taylor (Anti-Admin.); [data missing]

=== Election in 1793 during the 3rd Congress ===
In this special election, the winner was seated after March 4, 1793, the beginning of the next Congress.

State	Incumbent			Results	Candidates
State	Senator	Party	First elected	Results	Candidates
Connecticut (Class 3)	Roger Sherman	Pro-Administration	1791 (special)	Incumbent died July 23, 1793. Winner elected December 2, 1793. Pro-Administration hold.	▌ ✓ Stephen Mitchell (Pro-Admin.); [data missing]

== Georgia ==
1792/1793 United States Senate election in Georgia
- 1792/1793
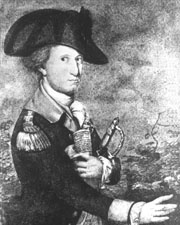

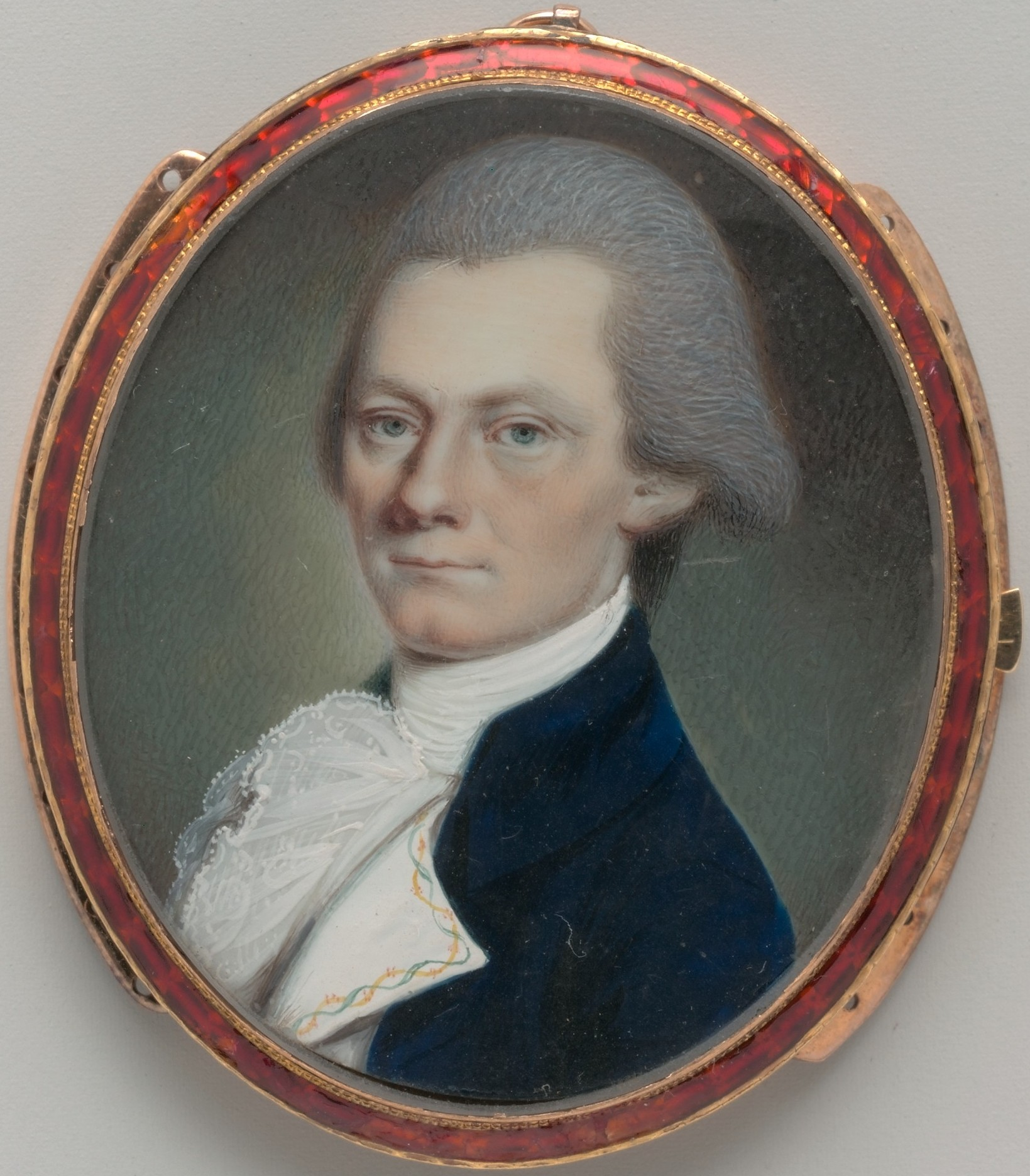
	Majority party	Minority party
Candidate	James Jackson	William Few
Party	Anti-Federalist	Anti-Federalist
Legislative vote	35	5
Percentage	85.4%	12.2%
U.S. senator before election
William Few
Anti-Administration
Elected U.S. senator
James Jackson
Anti-Administration

One-term Anti-Federalist William Few was defeated by fellow Anti-Federalist, James Jackson. Jackson won 24 votes in the Georgia House of Representatives and 11 in the State Senate for a combined total of 35. Few won 3 in the House and 2 in the Senate for a combined total of 5. Jackson took office as a member of the 3rd United States Congress on March 4, 1793. He would later resign in 1795 to run for his state's legislature.

United States Senate election in Georgia, 1792/93
Party	Candidate	Votes in the House	Votes in the Senate	Total	%
Anti-Federalist	James Jackson	24	11	35	85.4%
Anti-Federalist	William Few (incumbent)	3	2	5	12.2%
Anti-Federalist	George Mathews	1	-	1	2.4%

== Kentucky ==
1792 United States Senate election in Kentucky
- December 11, 1792
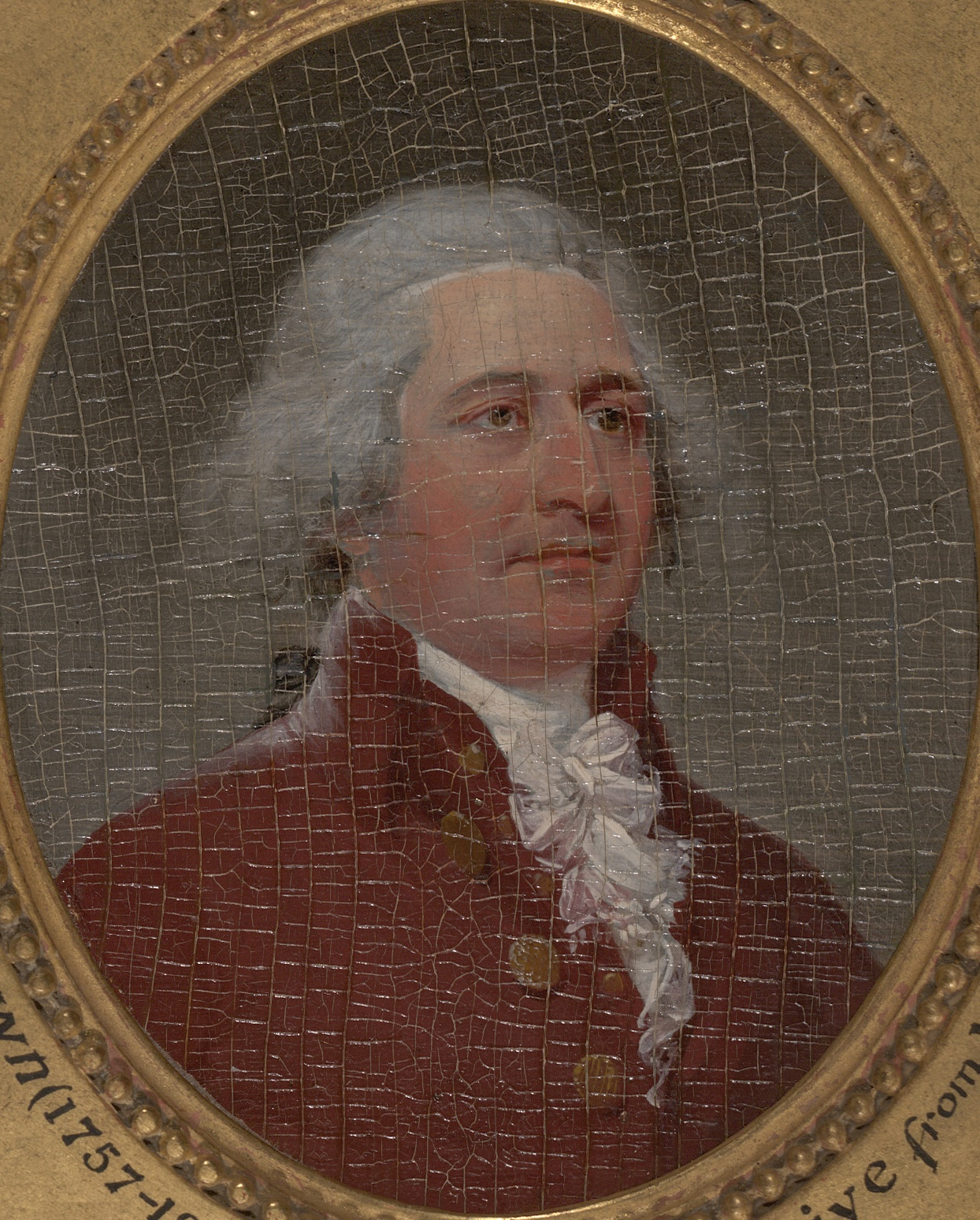
	Majority party
Candidate	John Brown
Party	Anti-Federalist
Legislative vote	Unanimous (exact total unknown)
Percentage	100%
U.S. senator before election
John Brown
Anti-Administration
Elected U.S. Senator
John Brown
Anti-Administration

Incumbent John Brown, who had previously been elected in a special election was easily reelected with no opposition and 100% of votes from the legislators.

== Maryland (special) ==
1793 United States Senate special election in Maryland
- December 6, 1792

80 members of the Maryland General Assembly
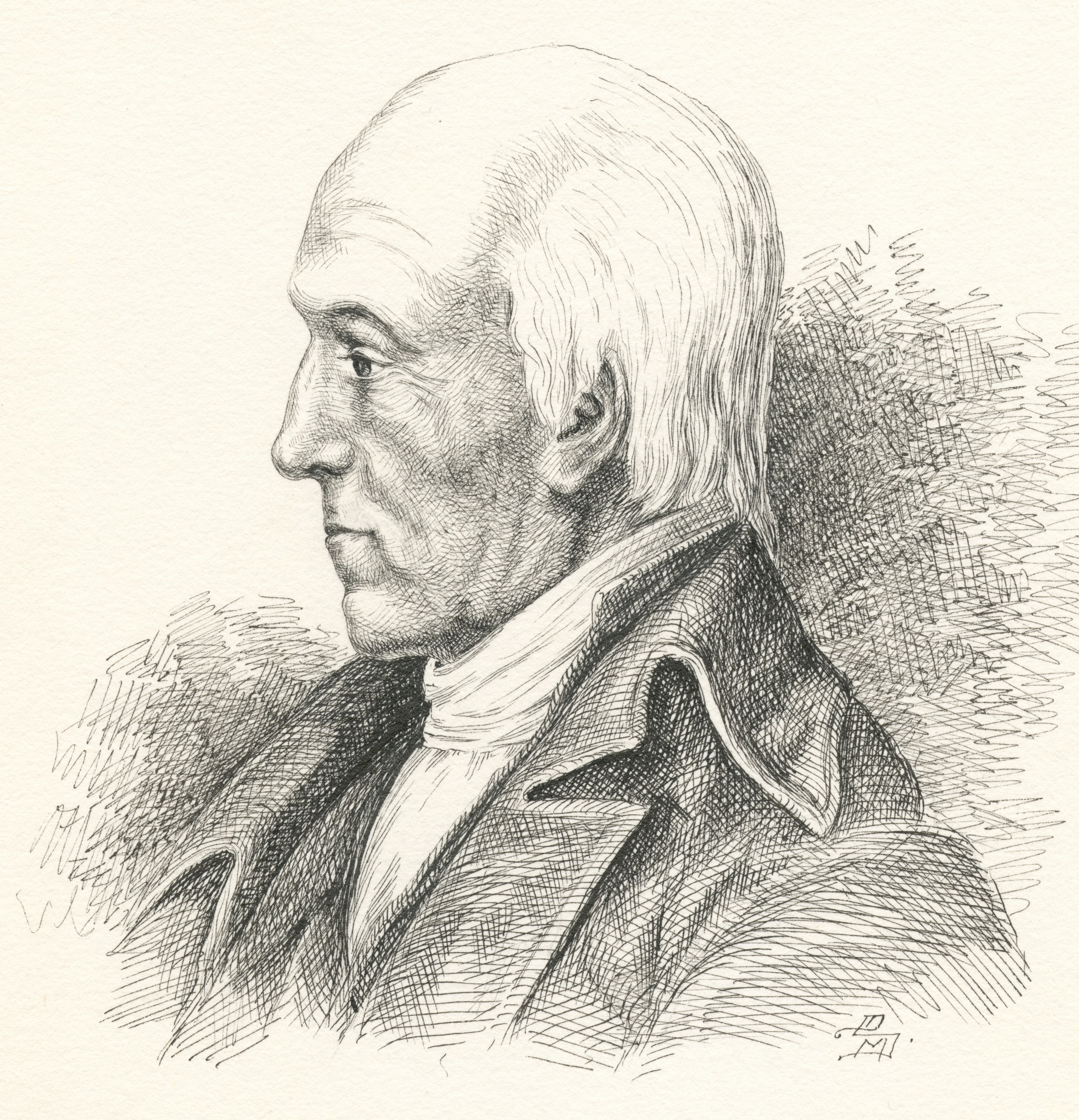
Candidate	Richard Potts	Josh Hoskins Stone
Party	Federalist	Federalist
Legislative vote	53	34
Percentage	60.92%	39.08%

Richard Potts won election to fill the seat vacated by Charles Carroll over Josh Hoskins Stone by a margin of 21.84%, or 19 votes, for the Class 1 seat.

== New Hampshire ==
1792 United States Senate election in New Hampshire
- 1792
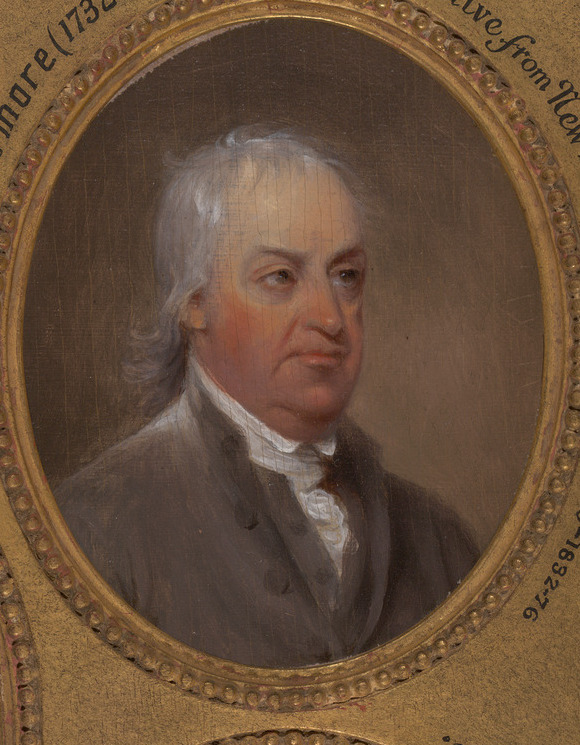

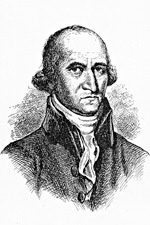

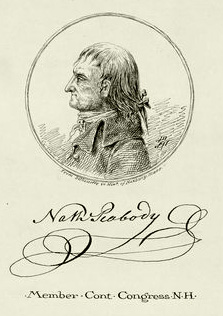
	Majority party	Minority party	Third party
Candidate	Samuel Livermore	Paine Wingate	Nathaniel Peabody
Party	Federalist	Anti-Federalist	Independent
Legislative vote	52	28	8
Percentage	58.4%	31.5%	9%
U.S. senator before election
Paine Wingate
Anti-Administration
Elected U.S. Senator
Samuel Livermore
Federalist

Incumbent U.S. Senator Paine Wingate was not reelected. The New Hampshire General Court instead elected Federalist Samuel Livermore, a U.S. Representative, to the seat. Livermore, like his fellow senator, John Langdon, would go on to serve as President Pro-Tempore during this term.

== North Carolina ==
Pro-Administration Samuel Johnston lost re-election to Anti-Administration Alexander Martin for the class 2 seat. The other senator, Benjamin Hawkins, switched his support from Pro- to Anti-Administration.

== Pennsylvania (special) ==
There was a special election on February 28, 1793, for the Class 1 seat from Pennsylvania. Incumbent William Maclay's term had ended on March 3, 1791, but the legislature failed to elect a successor due to a disagreement on the procedure to be followed in the election.

The seat remained vacant until Albert Gallatin was elected by the Pennsylvania General Assembly to the seat during this election.

Upon agreement between the two houses of the Pennsylvania General Assembly, the House of Representatives and the Senate, regarding the procedure to elect a new Senator, an election was finally held on February 28, 1793. The results of the vote of both houses combined are as follows:

State Legislature Results
Party	Candidate	Votes	%
Anti-Administration	Albert Gallatin	45	51.72%
Pro-Administration	Henry Miller	35	40.23%
Pro-Administration	Arthur St. Clair	1	1.15%
Pro-Administration	William Irvine	1	1.15%
N/A	Not voting	5	5.75%
Total votes		87	100%

On February 28, 1794, the Senate determined that Gallatin did not satisfy the citizenship requirement for service and he was removed from office. He later went on to serve in the U.S. House of Representatives. Gallatin was replaced in the Senate by a special election in 1794.

== Virginia ==
Anti-Administration senator Richard Henry Lee resigned October 8, 1792, just before the March 3, 1793 end of term. Anti-administration John Taylor of Caroline was elected October 18, 1792 to finish Lee's term and then re-elected in 1793 to the next term.

=== Special ===
Virginia special election
Candidate	Votes	%
John Taylor of Caroline	90	55.6
Arthur Lee	39	24.1
Francis Corbin	33	20.4

== See also ==
- 1792 United States elections
  - 1792 United States presidential election
  - 1792–93 United States House of Representatives elections
- 2nd United States Congress
- 3rd United States Congress
