= 1788 United States Senate elections in Pennsylvania =

First U.S. Senate election in Pennsylvania

1788 United States Senate election in Pennsylvania
- September 30, 1788
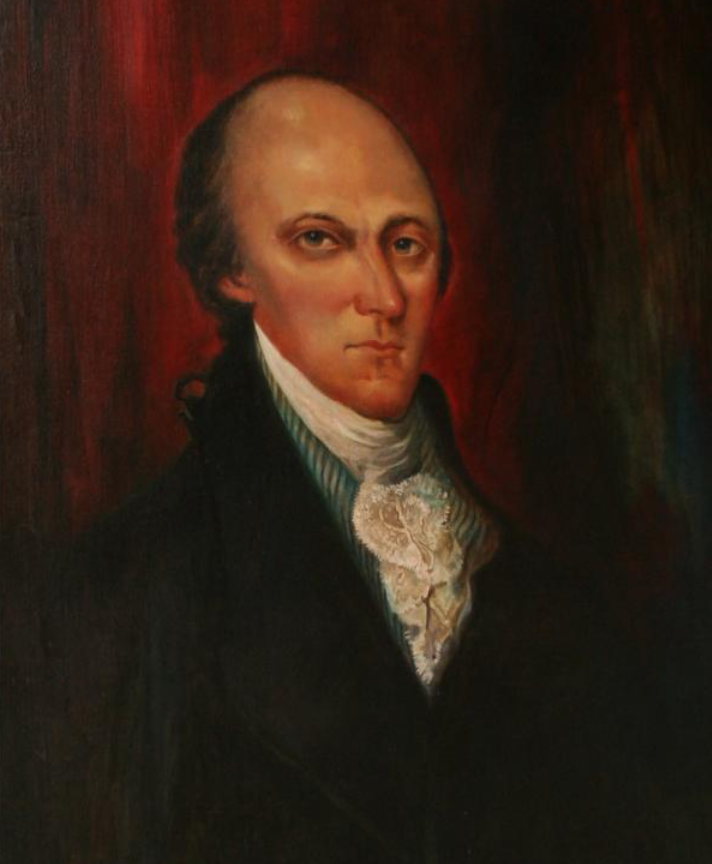

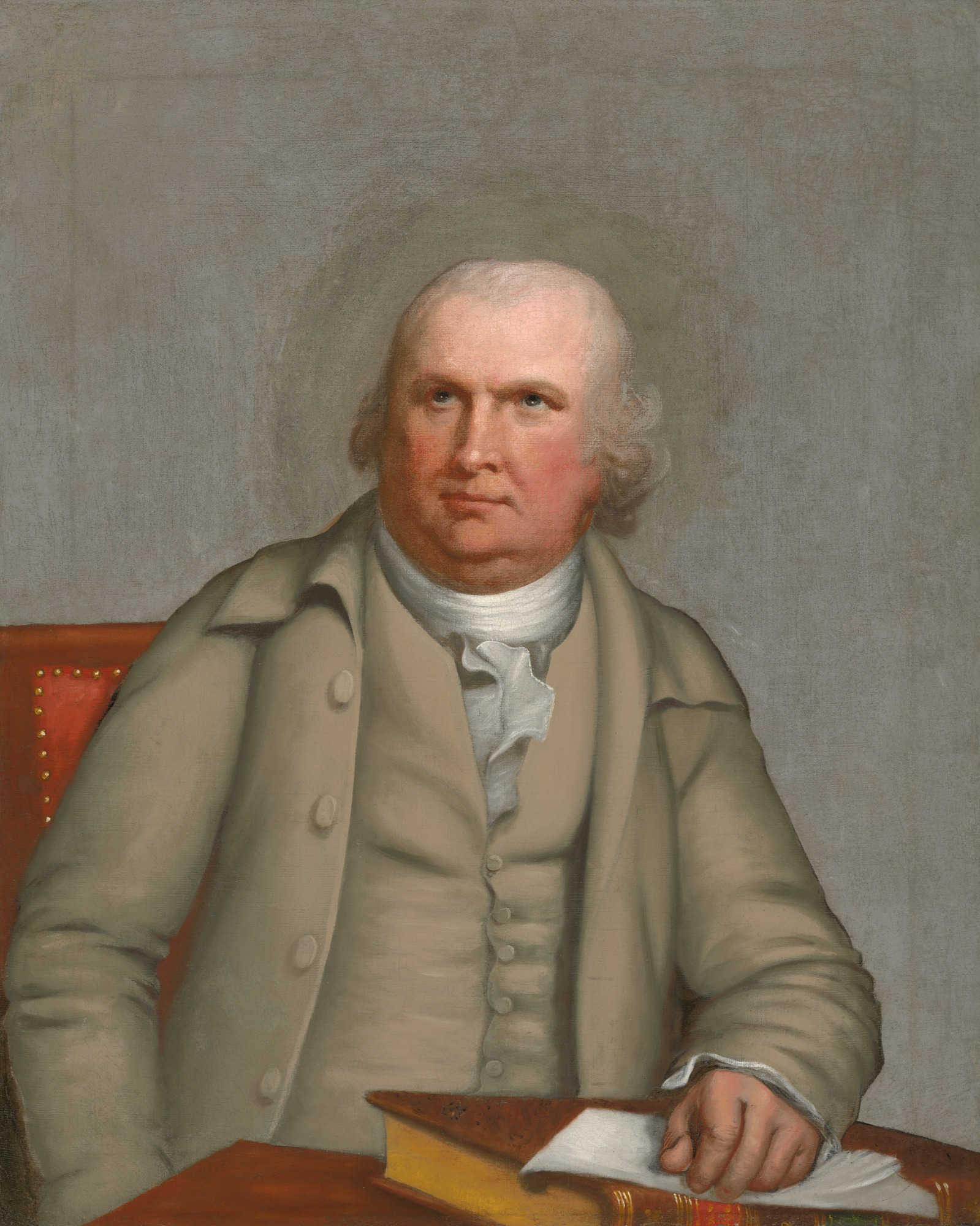
Nominee	William Maclay; Class I	Robert Morris; Class III
Party	Anti-Administration party	Federalist
Elected U.S. Senators
William Maclay (Class I)
Robert Morris (Class III)

The 1788 United States Senate election in Pennsylvania, held on September 30, 1788, was the first United States Senate election held in Pennsylvania. The Pennsylvania General Assembly, consisting of the House of Representatives and the Executive Council, elected Pennsylvania's first two United States Senators, William Maclay and Robert Morris.

== Results ==
The Anti-Federalist William Maclay was elected to the two-year staggered term of the Class I seat, while Federalist and American Founding Father Robert Morris was elected to the full six-year term of the Class III seat. While no official results of the votes were recorded, the State House recorded minutes of its election:

Agreeably to the order of the day, the House proceeded to the election of Senators to represent this state in the Congress of the United States, agreeably to the constitution adopted for the government of the said states; and the ballots being taken, it appeared that the Honorable William Maclay and Robert Morris, Esquires, were duly elected.

Upon the expiration of Senator Maclay's term in 1791, the State House of Representatives would not be able to elect a new United States senator due to a dispute regarding the rules and procedures of the election. The seat was finally filled in a 1793 election.

== See also ==
- 1788–89 United States Senate elections

Preceded by None	U.S. Senate elections in Pennsylvania (Class I); 1788	Succeeded by 1793
Preceded by None	U.S. Senate elections in Pennsylvania (Class III); 1788	Succeeded by 1795
