= 1793 United States Senate special election in Pennsylvania =

The 1793 United States Senate special election in Pennsylvania was held on February 28, 1793. Albert Gallatin was elected by the Pennsylvania General Assembly to the United States Senate.

== Background ==
Due to the initial staggering of United States Senate terms, the Class 1 seat held by William Maclay became vacant upon the expiration of Maclay's term on March 4, 1791. He had served since March 4, 1789, after being elected by the State Assembly in 1788. The election of a new Senator to succeed Maclay in 1791 was delayed due to a disagreement on the procedure to be followed in the election. The seat remained vacant until Albert Gallatin's election to the seat during this election.

== Results ==
Upon agreement between the two houses of the Pennsylvania General Assembly, the House of Representatives and the Senate, regarding the procedure to elect a new senator, an election was finally held on February 28, 1793. The results of the vote of both houses combined are as follows:

State legislature results
| Party | Candidate | Votes | % |
|---|---|---|---|
| Anti-Administration | Albert Gallatin | 45 | 51.72 |
| Pro-Administration | Henry Miller | 35 | 40.23 |
| Pro-Administration | Arthur St. Clair | 1 | 1.15 |
| Pro-Administration | William Irvine | 1 | 1.15 |
| N/A | Not voting | 5 | 5.75 |
| Totals | | 87 | 100.00% |

On February 28, 1794, the United States Senate determined that Gallatin did not satisfy the citizenship requirement to serve in the Senate. He was subsequently removed from office. He later went on to serve in the United States House of Representatives. Gallatin was replaced in the Senate by another special election in the State Assembly in 1794.

== See also ==
- 1792–93 United States Senate elections

| Preceded by 1788 | Pennsylvania U.S. Senate election (Class I); 1793 | Succeeded by 1794 |
