= 1790–91 United States Senate elections =

- Dates vary by state
- Class 1

9 of the 26 seats in the United States Senate, plus special elections 14 seats needed for a majority
	Majority party	Minority party
Party	Pro-Administration	Anti-Administration
Last election	19 seats	7 seats
Seats before	18	6
Seats after	17	8
Seat change	▼1	Steady
Seats up	7	2
Races won	8	2
- Results: Pro-Administration hold Anti-Administration gain Legislature failed to elect
Majority Faction before election
Pro-Administration
Elected Majority Faction
Pro-Administration

The 1790–91 United States Senate elections were held on various dates in various states. These U.S. Senate elections occurred during the first midterm election cycle, which took place in the middle of President George Washington's first term. As these elections were prior to the ratification of the Seventeenth Amendment in 1913, senators were chosen by state legislatures. Senators were elected over a wide range of time throughout 1790 and 1791, and a seat may have been filled months late or remained vacant due to legislative deadlock. In these elections, terms were up for the nine senators in Class 1.

As of these elections, formal organized political parties had yet to form in the United States, but two political factions were present: The coalition of senators who supported President Washington's administration were known as the Pro-Administration Party, and the senators against him as the Anti-Administration Party.

== Change in Senate composition ==
Note: There were no political parties in this Congress. Members are informally grouped into factions of similar interest, based on an analysis of their voting record.

=== Before the elections ===
After the June 25, 1790 elections in Rhode Island.

A_{3}	A_{2}	A_{1}							
A_{4}	A_{5}	A_{6} Penn. Ran	A_{7} Va. Ran	P_{19} N.J. Unknown	P_{18} R.I. Ran	P_{17} N.Y. Ran	P_{16} Mass. Ran	P_{15} Md. Ran	P_{14} Del. Ran
Majority →									P_{14} Del. Ran
P_{4}	P_{5}	P_{6}	P_{7}	P_{8}	P_{9}	P_{10}	P_{11}	P_{12}	P_{13} Conn. Ran
P_{3}	P_{2}	P_{1}							

=== Results of the regular elections ===
A_{3}	A_{2}	A_{1}							
A_{4}	A_{5}	A_{6} Va. Re-elected	A_{7} N.Y. Gain	V_{1} Penn. A Loss	P_{18} N.J. Hold	P_{17} Mass. Hold	P_{16} R.I. Re-elected	P_{15} Md. Re-elected	P_{14} Del. Re-elected
Majority →									P_{14} Del. Re-elected
P_{4}	P_{5}	P_{6}	P_{7}	P_{8}	P_{9}	P_{10}	P_{11}	P_{12}	P_{13} Conn. Re-elected
P_{3}	P_{2}	P_{1}							

=== Results of the special elections ===
A_{3}	A_{2}	A_{1}							
A_{4}	A_{5} Va. Gain	A_{6}	A_{7}	A_{8}	V_{1}	P_{17}	P_{16}	P_{15}	P_{14}
Majority →									P_{14}
P_{4}	P_{5}	P_{6}	P_{7}	P_{8}	P_{9}	P_{10}	P_{11}	P_{12} N.J. Hold	P_{13}
P_{3}	P_{2}	P_{1}							

Key:

A_{#}	Anti-Administration
P_{#}	Pro-Administration
V_{#}	Vacant

== Race summaries ==
Except if/when noted, the number following candidates is the whole number vote(s), not a percentage.

=== Regular and special elections during the 1st Congress ===
In these elections, the winners were seated before March 4, 1791; ordered by election date.

State	Incumbent			Results	Candidates
State	Senator	Party	First elected	Results	Candidates
Rhode Island (Class 1)	New seat			Rhode Island ratified the Constitution May 29, 1790. New senator elected June 7, 1790. Pro-Administration gain.	▌ ✓ Theodore Foster (Pro-Admin.); [data missing]
Rhode Island (Class 2)	New seat			Rhode Island ratified the Constitution May 29, 1790. New senator elected June 7, 1790. Anti-Administration gain.	▌ ✓ Joseph Stanton Jr. (Anti-Admin.); [data missing]
Virginia (special: Class 1)	John Walker	Pro-Administration	1790 (appointed)	Interim appointee retired when successor elected. New senator elected November 9, 1790. Anti-Administration gain.	▌ ✓ James Monroe (Anti-Admin.); [data missing]
New Jersey (special: Class 2)	William Paterson	Pro-Administration	1788	Incumbent resigned November 13, 1790, to become Governor of New Jersey. New senator elected November 23, 1790 on the second ballot. Pro-Administration hold.	▌ ✓ Philemon Dickinson (Pro-Admin.) 28; ▌Abraham Clark (Pro-Admin.) 19

=== Races leading to the 2nd Congress ===
In these regular elections, the winners were seated March 4, 1791; ordered by state.

All of these elections involved the Class 1 seats.

State	Incumbent			Results	Candidates
State	Senator	Party	First elected	Results	Candidates
Connecticut	Oliver Ellsworth	Pro-Administration	1788	Incumbent re-elected on an unknown date.	▌ ✓ Oliver Ellsworth (Pro-Admin.); [data missing]
Delaware	George Read	Pro-Administration	1788	Incumbent re-elected October 23, 1790.	▌ ✓ George Read (Pro-Admin.) Unanimous
Maryland	Charles Carroll	Pro-Administration	1788	Incumbent re-elected in 1791.	▌ ✓ Charles Carroll (Pro-Admin.); [data missing]
Massachusetts	Tristram Dalton	Pro-Administration	1788	Incumbent lost re-election. New senator elected in 1790 on the third ballot. Pro-Administration hold.	First ballot June 22, 1790: ▌ Nathaniel Gorham (Unknown) 36.89% (45 votes); ▌ George Cabot (Pro-Administration) 28.69% (35 votes); ▌ Charles Jarvis (Unknown) 26.23% (32 votes); ▌ Tristram Dalton (Unknown) 4.92% (6 votes); ▌ Nathan Dane (Pro-Administration) 1.64% (2 votes); ▌ Samuel Holten (Unknown) 1.64% (2 votes); Second ballot June 22, 1790: ▌ George Cabot (Pro-Administration) 32.88% (48 votes); ▌ Nathaniel Gorham (Unknown) 29.45% (43 votes); ▌ Charles Jarvis (Unknown) 22.60% (33 votes); ▌ Samuel Holten (Unknown) 15.07% (22 votes); Third ballot June 22, 1790: ▌ ✓ George Cabot (Pro-Admin.) 59.18% (87 votes); ▌Nathaniel Gorham (Unknown) 24.49% (36 votes); ▌Charles Jarvis (Unknown) 13.61% (20 votes); ▌Samuel Holten (Unknown) 2.72% (4 votes); ▌Tristram Dalton (Pro-Admin.) Eliminated
New Jersey	Jonathan Elmer	Pro-Administration	1788	Incumbent lost re-election. New senator elected in 1790. Pro-Administration hold.	▌ ✓ John Rutherfurd (Pro-Admin.) 32; ▌Jonathan Elmer (Pro-Admin.) 14; ▌Abraham Clark (Pro-Admin.) 3
New York	Philip Schuyler	Pro-Administration	1789	Incumbent lost re-election. New senator elected January 19, 1791. Anti-Administration gain.	▌ ✓ Aaron Burr (Anti-Admin.) 54.24% Assembly (32–27) and 77.78% Senate (14–4); ▌Philip Schuyler (Pro-Admin.) 45.77% Assembly (27–32); ▌Egbert Benson (Pro-Admin.) 40.68% Assembly (24–35)
Pennsylvania	William Maclay	Anti-Administration	1788	Incumbent lost re-election. Legislature failed to elect a successor, leaving the seat vacant. Anti-Administration loss.	None.
Rhode Island	Theodore Foster	Pro-Administration	1790	Incumbent re-elected in 1791.	▌ ✓ Theodore Foster (Pro-Admin.); [data missing]
Virginia	James Monroe	Anti-Administration	1790 (special)	Incumbent re-elected in 1791.	▌ ✓ James Monroe (Anti-Admin.); [data missing]

=== Special and regular elections in 1791 during the 2nd Congress ===
In these elections, the winners were seated after March 4, 1791, the beginning of the next Congress.

State	Incumbent			Results	Candidates
State	Senator	Party	First elected	Results	Candidates
Connecticut (Class 3)	William S. Johnson	Pro-Administration	1788	Resigned March 4, 1791. New senator elected June 13, 1791. Pro-Administration hold.	▌ ✓ Roger Sherman (Pro-Admin.); [data missing]
Vermont (Class 1)	None (new state)			Vermont was admitted to the Union March 4, 1791. New senator elected October 17, 1791. Anti-Administration gain.	▌ ✓ Moses Robinson (Anti-Admin.); [data missing]
Vermont (Class 3)	None (new state)			Vermont was admitted to the Union March 4, 1791. New senator elected October 17, 1791. Anti-Administration gain.	▌ ✓ Stephen R. Bradley (Anti-Admin.); [data missing]

== Connecticut ==
All of the senators from Connecticut were Pro-Administration through 1795.

=== Connecticut (regular) ===
Oliver Ellsworth was re-elected in 1791.

=== Connecticut (special) ===
William Samuel Johnson resigned March 3, 1791, at the end of the 1st Congress and Roger Sherman was elected June 13, 1791, to finish the term.

== Maryland ==
1790 United States Senate election in Maryland
- November 26, 1790

80 members of the Maryland General Assembly
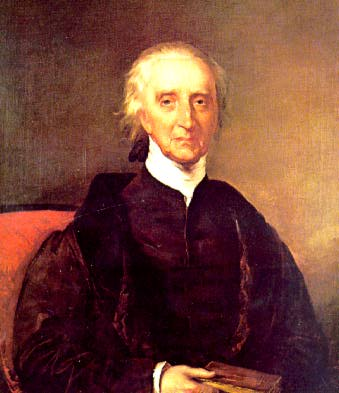

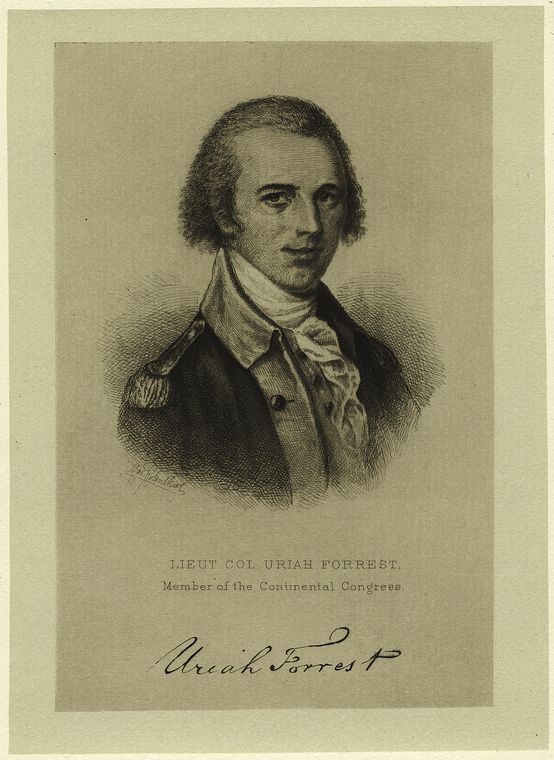
Candidate	Charles Carroll	Uriah Forrest
Party	Federalist	Federalist
Legislative vote	45	30
Percentage	60.00%	40.00%

Charles Carroll won re-election over Uriah Forrest by a margin of 20.00%, or 15 votes, for the Class 1 seat.

== Massachusetts ==
Incumbent U.S. Senator, Tristam Dalton sought re-election but was eliminated before the third ballot. The third ballot saw the election of George Cabot, who had been a member of the Massachusetts Provincial Congress. Cabot won 87 votes.

1790 United States Senate election in Massachusetts
- June 23, 1790
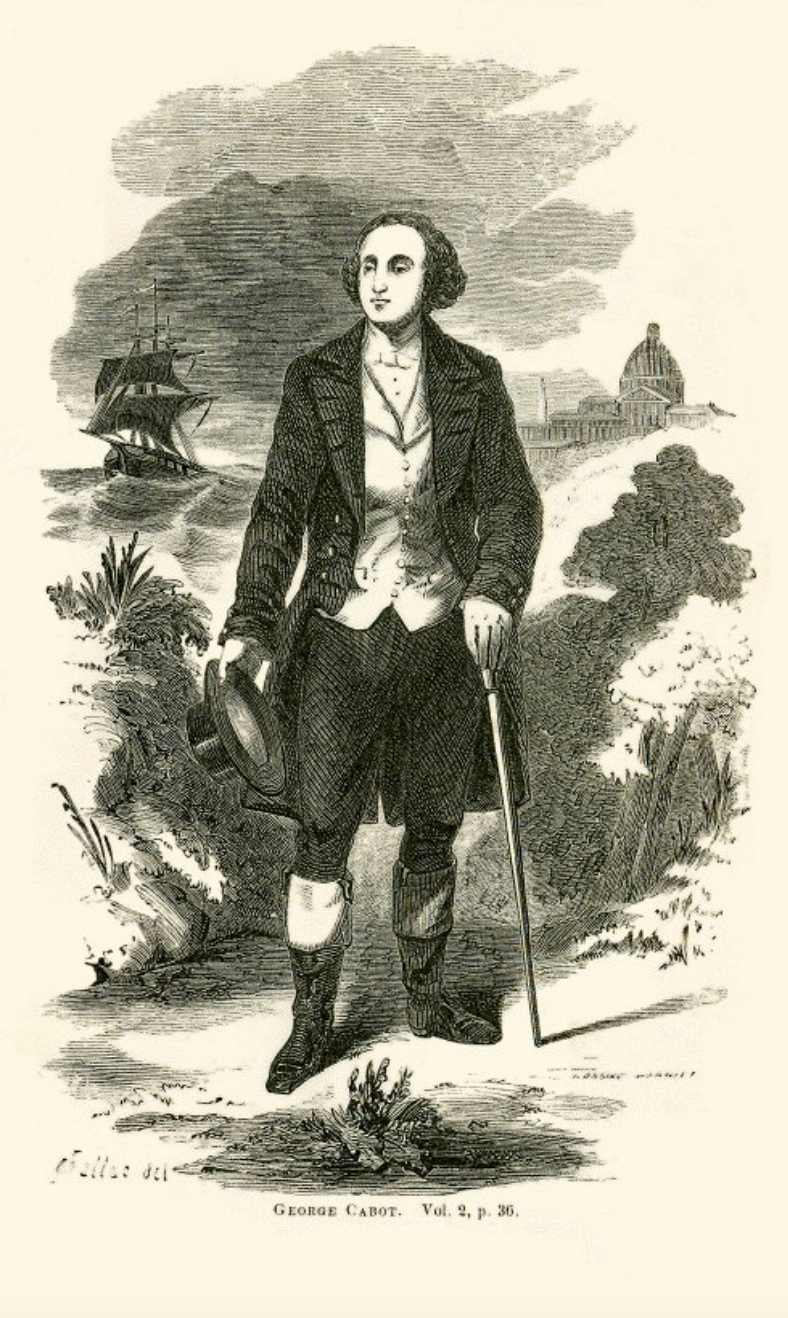

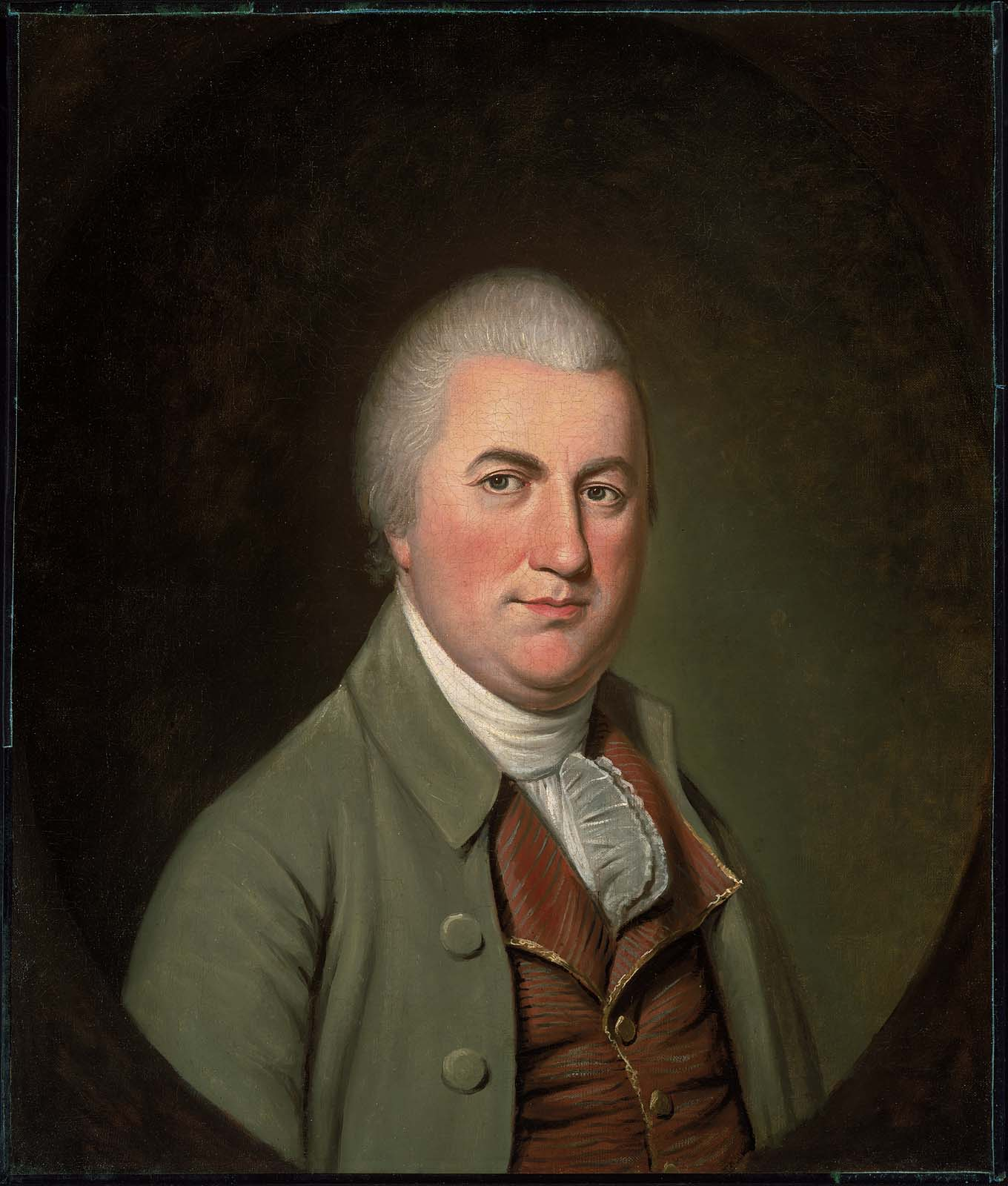

	Majority party	Minority party	Third party
Candidate	George Cabot	Nathaniel Gorham	Charles Jarvis
Party	Federalist	Federalist	Independent
Legislative vote	87	36	20
Percentage	59.2%	24.5%	13.6%

== New York ==
The election in New York was held January 19, 1791, by the New York State Legislature.

Incumbent Philip Schuyler's term would expire March 3, 1791.

At the State election in April 1790, nominal Federalist majorities were elected to both houses of the 14th New York State Legislature, but many Federalists were friendly to the Democratic-Republican Governor George Clinton, party lines not being drawn very strictly then.

The incumbent Philip Schuyler ran for re-election as the candidate of the Federalist Party. New York State Attorney General Aaron Burr was the candidate of the Democratic-Republican Party, but was at that time a rather moderate politician, opposing the ultras of both parties.

Burr was the choice of both the State Senate and the State Assembly, and was declared elected. Schuyler was defeated despite the nominal majority of his party. Many of the Federalists took the opportunity to show their disapproval of both Schuyler's haughtiness and the financial policies of Alexander Hamilton, the U.S. Secretary of the Treasury and Schuyler's son-in-law. Besides, the Livingston faction of the Federalist Party felt betrayed after the election of Rufus King over their candidate James Duane in 1789, and now allied themselves with Clinton and later became Democratic-Republicans.

Office	House	Democratic-Republican candidate		Federalist candidate	
U.S. senator	State Senate (23 members)	✓ Aaron Burr	12	Philip Schuyler	4
	State Assembly (65 members)	✓ Aaron Burr		Philip Schuyler	

Obs.: Burr had a majority of 5 votes in the Assembly, but the exact number of votes is unclear.

== Pennsylvania ==
In 1791, the legislature failed to elect due to a disagreement on procedure. The seat would remain vacant until 1793.

== Vermont ==
Stephen R. Bradley and Moses Robinson were elected by the Vermont House of Representatives and Governor and Council in January 1791, anticipating Vermont's admission to the union. Vermont was admitted as the 14th state on March 4, 1791. The Senate had adjourned on March 3, at the completion of the 1st United States Congress; the 2nd United States Congress held a one-day session on March 4, and was not scheduled to convene again until October 24.

As a result of this congressional schedule Bradley and Robinson had not been seated when the Vermont House of Representatives convened in early October, 1791. At this legislative session, some members suggested that the January election of Bradley and Robinson had been premature, since Vermont had not yet been admitted to the union. Bradley and Robinson volunteered to resign the credentials of their January elections; on October 17, the Governor and Council voted again, and selected Bradley and Robinson. The House of Representatives then voted a second time, and also selected Bradley and Robinson. No vote totals were recorded.

Bradley was selected for the "short term" (Class 3), which expired on March 3, 1795. Robinson received the "long term" (Class 1), which expired on March 3, 1797.

== Virginia ==
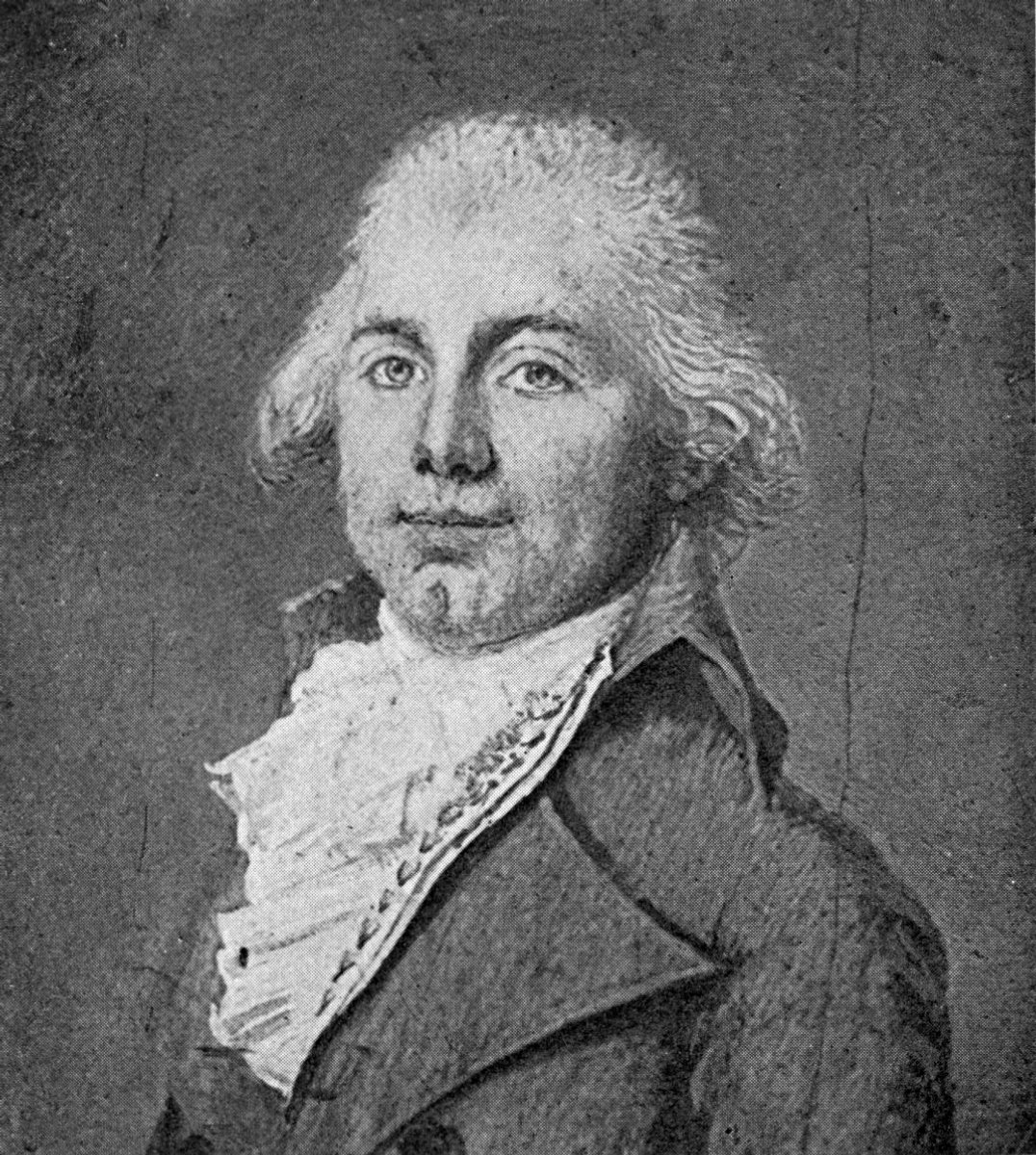
Senator James Monroe

William Grayson died March 12, 1790, and John Walker was appointed to continue the term.

=== Virginia (special) ===
Future President James Monroe was elected in November 1790 to finish the term.

=== Virginia (regular) ===
Monroe was re-elected in 1791 to the next term, as well.

== See also ==
- 1790 United States elections
  - 1790–91 United States House of Representatives elections
- 1st United States Congress
- 2nd United States Congress
