= 1794 United States Senate special election in Pennsylvania =

The 1794 United States Senate special election in Pennsylvania was held on March 31, 1794. James Ross was elected by the Pennsylvania General Assembly to the United States Senate.

== Background ==
The Anti-Administration Albert Gallatin had been elected to the United States Senate by the General Assembly, consisting of the House of Representatives and the Senate, in February 1793. In February 1794, the United States Senate challenged his eligibility for holding the office under the citizenship requirement and he was subsequently removed from office on February 28, 1794.

== Results ==
Following the removal of Sen. Albert Gallatin from office after his eligibility was successfully challenged, the Pennsylvania General Assembly convened on March 31, 1794, to elect a new senator to fill the vacancy. The results of the vote of both houses combined are as follows:

State legislature results
Party	Candidate	Votes	%
Federalist	James Ross	45	51.72
Unknown	Robert Coleman	35	40.23
Federalist	Samuel Sitgreaves	1	1.15
N/A	Not voting	6	6.70
Totals		87	100.00%

Preceded by 1793	Pennsylvania U.S. Senate election (Class I); 1794	Succeeded by 1797
