= 1788–89 United States Senate elections =

- September 30, 1788-January 22, 1789

All 26 seats in the United States Senate 14 seats needed for a majority
	Majority party	Minority party
Party	Pro-Administration	Anti-Administration
Seats won	13	7
- Results of the elections: Pro-Administration Anti-Administration; Territories
Elected Majority Faction
Pro-Administration

The 1788–1789 United States Senate elections were the first U.S. Senate elections following the adoption of the Constitution of the United States. They coincided with the election of George Washington as the first president of the United States. As these elections were prior to the ratification of the Seventeenth Amendment in 1913, senators were chosen by state legislatures.

== Events of the election ==
Senators were elected over a wide range of time throughout 1788 and 1789. Pennsylvania was the first state to select its senators on September 30, 1788, and South Carolina was the last state on January 22, 1789. New York, North Carolina, and Rhode Island elected their senators between July 16, 1789, and June 12, 1790, after the convening of Congress.

Among the original 13 states, ten of them selected their senators prior to the official start of the 1st United States Congress on March 4, 1789, ranging from Pennsylvania in September 1788 to South Carolina in January 1789. New York failed to elect its senators until July 1789. North Carolina and Rhode Island did not ratify the Constitution until after the 1st Congress began; North Carolina then elected its senators in November 1789, but Rhode Island failed to ratify the Constitution until 1790.

Under Article I, Section 3, Clause 2 of the U.S. Constitution, the actual division of the Senate's seats into the three classes was not performed until after the 1st Congress convened. Thus, the 20 elected senators from the ten initial states did not know ahead of time whether they would serve Class 1's interim two-year term, Class 2's interim four-year term, or the full six-year term of Class 3. Then starting with New York, a random draw determined which classes each new state's seats would belong to while keeping the three classes as close to the same size as possible.

As of these elections, formal organized political parties had yet to form in the United States, but two political factions were present: The coalition of senators who supported President George Washington's administration were known as the Pro-Administration Party, and the senators against him as the Anti-Administration Party. Among the initial 20 senators elected before the 1st Congress began on March 4, 1789, 13 of them were Pro-Administration.

== Resulting composition ==
Note: There were no political parties in this Congress. Members are informally grouped into factions of similar interest, based on an analysis of their voting record.

=== Beginning of the 1st Congress ===
New York failed to elect its senators until after the Congress began, so its seats are labelled here as "Vacant." North Carolina and Rhode Island did not ratify the Constitution until after the Congress began, so their seats are not included here.

V_{1} N.Y.
A_{1} Del.	A_{2} Ga.	A_{3} Ga.	A_{4} N.H.	A_{5} Penn.	A_{6} Va.	A_{7} Va.	P_{13} S.C.	P_{12} S.C.	P_{11} Penn.
Majority →									P_{11} Penn.
P_{1} Conn.	P_{2} Conn.	P_{3} Del.	P_{4} Md.	P_{5} Md.	P_{6} Mass.	P_{7} Mass.	P_{8} N.H.	P_{9} N.J.	P_{10} N.J.
V_{2} N.Y.

Key:

A_{#}	Anti-Administration
P_{#}	Pro-Administration
V_{#}	Vacant

=== Division into the three classes ===
Article I, Section 3, Clause 2 of the U.S. Constitution specified that the actual division of the senate seats into the three classes was to be performed after these initial states elected their senators:

Immediately after they shall be assembled in Consequence of the first Election, they shall be divided as equally as may be into three Classes. The Seats of the Senators of the first Class shall be vacated at the Expiration of the second Year, of the second Class at the Expiration of the fourth Year, and of the third Class at the Expiration of the sixth Year, so that one third may be chosen every second Year.

The allocation of the classes by lot then took place in May 1789, two months after the first Congress began in March 1789. New York was then the first to be treated as a "new state admitted to the Union" under this process when they elected their senators in July 1789, drawing lots to determine which classes their seats would belong to while keeping the three classes as close to the same size as possible.

== Race summaries ==
=== Races leading to the 1st Congress ===
In these general elections, the winners were elected in advance of March 4, 1789, the date set to be the beginning of the 1st Congress. Ordered by state, then by the class that they were eventually assigned in May 1789.

State	Result	Candidates
Connecticut (Class 1)	Winner elected October 16, 1788. Pro-Administration win.	▌ ✓ Oliver Ellsworth (Pro-Admin.); [data missing]
Connecticut (Class 3)	Winner elected October 16, 1788. Pro-Administration win.	▌ ✓ William S. Johnson (Pro-Admin.); [data missing]
Delaware (Class 2)	Winner elected October 25, 1788. Anti-Administration win.	▌ ✓ Richard Bassett (Anti-Admin.); [data missing]
Delaware (Class 1)	Winner elected October 25, 1788. Pro-Administration win.	▌ ✓ George Read (Pro-Admin.); [data missing]
Georgia (Class 2)	Winner elected January 17, 1789. Anti-Administration win.	▌ ✓ William Few (Anti-Admin.); [data missing]
Georgia (Class 3)	Winner elected January 17, 1789. Anti-Administration win.	▌ ✓ James Gunn (Anti-Admin.); [data missing]
Maryland (Class 1)	Winner elected December 10, 1788, on the third ballot "to represent the western shore." Pro-Administration win.	First ballot (December 11, 1788): ▌ Uriah Forrest (Unknown) 49.40% (41 votes); ▌ Charles Carroll (Pro-Administration) 48.19% (40 votes); Scattering 2.41% (2 votes); Second ballot (December 11, 1788): ▌ Charles Carroll (Pro-Administration) 50.00% (41 votes); ▌ Uriah Forrest (Unknown) 50.00% (41 votes); Third ballot (December 11, 1788): ▌ ✓ Charles Carroll (Pro-Admin.) 51.85% (42 votes); ▌Uriah Forrest (Unknown) 48.15% (39 votes)
Maryland (Class 3)	Winner elected December 10, 1788, on the second ballot "to represent the eastern shore." Pro-Administration win.	First ballot (December 11, 1788): ▌ John Henry (Pro-Administration) 49.40% (41 votes); ▌ George Gale (Unknown) 49.40% (41 votes); ▌ Scattering 1.20% (1 vote); Second ballot (December 11, 1788): ▌ ✓ John Henry (Pro-Admin.) 51.22% (42 votes); ▌George Gale (Unknown) 48.78% (40 votes)
Massachusetts (Class 1)	Winner elected November 24, 1788, on the seventh ballot. Pro-Administration win.	▌ ✓ Tristram Dalton (Pro-Admin.) 53.79% (78 votes); ▌Others 46.21% (67 votes); ▌Nathan Dane (Unknown) Eliminated; ▌Charles Jarvis (Unknown) Eliminated; ▌Azor Orne (Unknown)
Massachusetts (Class 2)	Winner elected November 24, 1788. Pro-Administration win.	▌ ✓ Caleb Strong (Pro-Admin.) 36.10% (152 votes); ▌Charles Jarvis (Unknown) 18.76% (79 votes); ▌Theodore Sedgwick (Pro-Admin.) 15.91% (67 votes); ▌John Lowell (Pro-Admin.) 14.01% (59 votes); ▌[FNU] Holten (Unknown) 9.26% (39 votes); ▌[FNU] Gorham (Unknown) 5.46% (23 votes); Others 0.48% (2 votes)
New Hampshire (Class 3)	Winner elected November 12, 1788. Pro-Administration win.	▌ ✓ John Langdon (Pro-Admin.) 95.24%; (60 "aye", 3 "nay")
New Hampshire (Class 2)	Josiah Bartlett was at first elected November 12, 1788, but "declined the appointment." Winner elected January 3, 1789. Anti-Administration win.	▌ ✓ Paine Wingate (Anti-Admin.) 69.05%; (58 "Aye", 26 "Nay")
New Jersey (Class 1)	Winner elected November 25, 1788. Pro-Administration win.	▌ ✓ William Paterson (Pro-Admin.) 45 votes (Class 2); ▌ ✓ Jonathan Elmer (Pro-Admin.) 29 votes (Class 1); ▌Abraham Clark (Unknown) 19 votes; ▌Elias Boudinot (Federalist) 7 votes
New Jersey (Class 2)	Winner elected November 25, 1788. Pro-Administration win.	▌ ✓ William Paterson (Pro-Admin.) 45 votes (Class 2); ▌ ✓ Jonathan Elmer (Pro-Admin.) 29 votes (Class 1); ▌Abraham Clark (Unknown) 19 votes; ▌Elias Boudinot (Federalist) 7 votes
Pennsylvania (Class 1)	Winner elected September 30, 1788. Anti-Administration win.	▌ ✓ William Maclay (Anti-Admin.) 66 votes (Class 1); ▌ ✓ Robert Morris (Pro-Admin.) 37 votes (Class 3); ▌William Irvine 31 votes
Pennsylvania (Class 3)	Winner elected September 30, 1788. Pro-Administration win.	▌ ✓ William Maclay (Anti-Admin.) 66 votes (Class 1); ▌ ✓ Robert Morris (Pro-Admin.) 37 votes (Class 3); ▌William Irvine 31 votes
South Carolina (Class 2)	Winner elected January 22, 1789. Pro-Administration win.	▌ ✓ Pierce Butler (Pro-Admin.); "Almost unanimously"
South Carolina (Class 3)	Winner elected January 22, 1789. Pro-Administration win.	▌ ✓ Ralph Izard (Pro-Admin.)
Virginia (Class 2)	Winner elected November 8, 1788. Anti-Administration win.	▌ ✓ Richard Henry Lee (Anti-Admin.) 98 votes (Class 2); ▌ ✓ William Grayson (Anti-Admin.) 86 votes (Class 1); ▌James Madison (Federalist)
Virginia (Class 1)	Winner elected November 8, 1788. Anti-Administration win.	▌ ✓ Richard Henry Lee (Anti-Admin.) 98 votes (Class 2); ▌ ✓ William Grayson (Anti-Admin.) 86 votes (Class 1); ▌James Madison (Federalist)

=== Elections during the 1st Congress ===
In these general elections, the winners were elected in 1789 after March 4; ordered by election date.

State	Result	Candidates
New York (Class 3)	State legislature failed to pick Senator until after Congress began. Winner elected July 25, 1789. Pro-Administration win.	▌ ✓ Rufus King (Pro-Admin.); [data missing]
New York (Class 1)	State legislature failed to pick Senator until after Congress began. Winner elected July 27, 1789. Pro-Administration win.	▌ ✓ Philip Schuyler (Pro-Admin.); [data missing]
North Carolina (Class 2)	North Carolina ratified the Constitution November 21, 1789. Winner elected November 27, 1789. Pro-Administration win.	▌ ✓ Samuel Johnston (Pro-Admin.); [data missing]
North Carolina (Class 3)	North Carolina ratified the Constitution November 21, 1789. Winner elected November 27, 1789. Pro-Administration win.	▌ ✓ Benjamin Hawkins (Pro-Admin.); [data missing]

== Maryland ==
1788 United States Senate election in Maryland
- December 10, 1788

80 members of the Maryland General Assembly
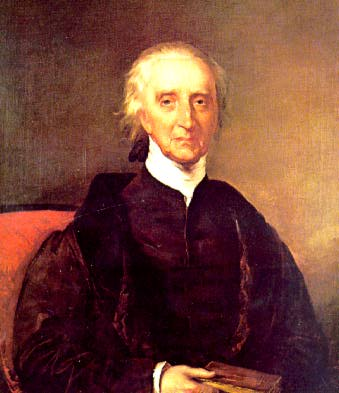

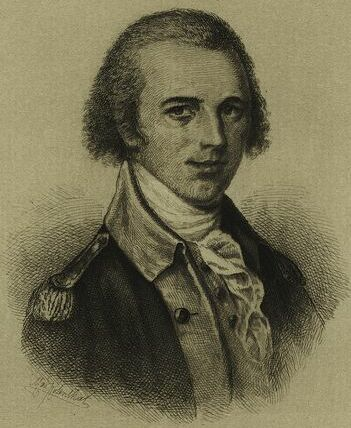
Candidate	Charles Carroll	Uriah Forrest
Party	Federalist	Federalist
Legislative vote	42	39
Percentage	51.85%	48.15%

1788 United States Senate election in Maryland
- December 10, 1788

80 members of the Maryland General Assembly

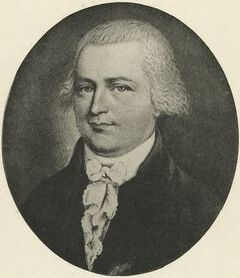
Candidate	John Henry	George Gale
Party	Federalist	Federalist
Legislative vote	42	40
Percentage	51.22%	48.78%

The Maryland General Assembly convened on December 10, 1788, in order to vote for the inaugural holders of Maryland's seats. There were two candidates for each seat, and all four were of the Federalist Party. An outright majority (50% plus one) was required for a candidate to win.

Charles Carroll won election over Uriah Forrest by a margin of 3.70%, or 3 votes, for one of the seats. This election was decided on the third ballot, after the first did not produce a majority and the second had both candidates tie.

John Henry won election over George Gale by a margin of 2.44%, or 2 votes, for the other seat. This election was decided on the second ballot, after both candidates tied with pluralities on the first.

In May 1789, the lot draw performed by the 1st U.S. Senate assigned Carroll's seat to Class 1, whose term would expire March 3, 1791, and Henry's seat to Class 3, whose term would expire March 3, 1795.

== New York ==
The election was held in July 1789. It was the first such election, and before the actual election the New York State Legislature had to establish rules for proceeding. They decided to ballot separately, and then pass a joint resolution once they had concurred in the election of two candidates.

On July 15, Schuyler was nominated first, and members of each chamber attempted to substitute the names of other candidates, including Ezra L'Hommedieu and Rufus King. These motions failed, and Schuyler was elected by a vote of 37 to 19 in the Assembly, and 13 to 6 in the Senate.

King's election came after individual legislators and the two chambers failed to agree on the election of James Duane, Ezra L'Hommedieu, or Lewis Morris. King was then elected unanimously by the Assembly, and by a vote of 11 to 8 in the Senate. On July 16, Schuyler and King were appointed to the U.S. Senate by a joint resolution of the State Legislature.

King took his seat on July 25, and drew the lot for Class 3, his term expiring on March 3, 1795. Schuyler took his seat on July 27, and drew the lot for Class 1, his term expiring on March 3, 1791. The 1st United States Congress convened at New York City, as did the regular session of the New York State Legislature in January 1790. Schuyler retained his seat in the State Senate while serving concurrently in the U.S. Senate. Schuyler was also elected on January 15 a member of the State's Council of Appointments which consisted of the Governor of New York, and four State Senators elected annually by the State Assembly. On January 27, the New York State Legislature resolved that it was "incompatible with the U.S. Constitution for any person holding an office under the United States government at the same time to have a seat in the Legislature of this State", and that if a member of the State Legislature was elected or appointed to a federal office, the seat should be declared vacant upon acceptance. Thus U.S. Senator Schuyler, Federal Judge James Duane and Congressmen John Hathorn and John Laurance vacated their seats in the State Senate. On April 3, John Cantine, a member of the Council of Appointments, raised the question if Schuyler, after vacating his State Senate seat, was still a member of the council. Philip Livingston, another member, held that once elected a member could not be expelled in any case. On April 5, Governor Clinton asked the State Assembly for a decision, but the latter refused to do so, arguing that it was a question of law, which could be pursued in the courts. Schuyler thus kept his seat in the Council of Appointments until the end of the term.

== North Carolina ==
North Carolina was the 12th state to ratify the new United States Constitution, doing so in November 1789, months after the First Congress had first convened. A few days after that ratification, on November 26, 1789, the two houses of the state legislature jointly elected incumbent Governor Samuel Johnston (who was considered pro-Administration) as North Carolina's first United States Senator. The minutes of the state Senate indicate that the two houses had actually voted for both U.S. Senate seats, but that no candidate received a majority for the second seat.

Days later, the state Senate sent messages to the state House of Commons nominating candidates for the state's other Senate seat. These included William Lenoir, William Blount, Benjamin Hawkins, and Timothy Bloodworth. Hawkins (who was also pro-Administration at the time) was elected jointly by the two houses on December 8, 1789.

== Pennsylvania ==
The election was held on September 30, 1788. The Pennsylvania General Assembly, consisting of the House of Representatives and the Senate, elected Pennsylvania's first two United States senators, William Maclay and Robert Morris. Anti-Federalist William Maclay was elected to the two-year staggered term of the Class 1 seat, while Federalist and founding father Robert Morris was elected to the full six-year term of the Class 3 seat.

While no official results of the votes were recorded, the State House recorded minutes of its election:

Agreeably to the order of the day, the House proceeded to the election of Senators to represent this state in the Congress of the United States, agreeably to the constitution adopted for the government of the said states; and the ballots being taken, it appeared that the Honorable William Maclay and Robert Morris, Esquires, were duly elected.

== See also ==
- 1788–89 United States elections
  - 1788–89 United States House of Representatives elections
- 1st United States Congress

== Works cited ==
- Jensen, Merrill; Becker, Robert, eds. (1976). The First Federal Elections 1788-1790: Congress, South Carolina, Pennsylvania, Massachusetts, New Hampshire. Vol. 1. University of Wisconsin Press. ISBN 0299066908.
