= Anti-Administration party =

United States political faction

Anti-Administration party Opposition
- Leader: James Madison; Thomas Jefferson; Henry Tazewell
- Founded: 1789; 237 years ago
- Dissolved: 1792; 234 years ago
- Preceded by: Anti-Federalists
- Merged into: Democratic-Republican Party
- Headquarters: Philadelphia, Pennsylvania
- Newspaper: National Gazette
- Ideology: Agrarianism; Anti-clericalism; Liberalism; Populism; Republicanism
- Political position: Left-wing

The Anti-Administration party, known at the time as the Opposition, was an informal political faction in the United States led by James Madison and Thomas Jefferson that opposed policies of Secretary of the Treasury Alexander Hamilton in the first term of U.S. president George Washington. It was not an organized political party, but an unorganized faction. Most members had been Anti-Federalists in 1788, when they opposed ratification of the U.S. Constitution. However, the situation was fluid, with members joining and leaving.

Although contemporaries often referred to Hamilton's opponents as "Anti-Federalists", that term is now seen as imprecise since several Anti-Administration leaders supported ratification, including Virginia Representative James Madison. He joined former Anti-Federalists to oppose Hamilton's financial plans in 1790. William Maclay, a leader of the faction in the Senate, used in his Congressional diary the term "Republican".

After Jefferson took leadership of the opposition to Hamilton in 1792, the faction became a formal party, Jefferson's Republican Party, which is often called the Democratic-Republican Party by historians and political scientists.

== History ==
At the Constitutional Convention in 1787 and during the ratifying process in 1788, Madison was one of the most prominent advocates of a smaller national government. He wrote The Federalist Papers, together with Hamilton and John Jay. In 1789 and 1790, Madison was a leader in support of a new federal government with limited powers.

At the time, the concept of a loyal opposition party was novel. However, Madison joined with Henry Tazewell and others to oppose Hamilton's First Report on the Public Credit in January 1790. The creation of the coalition marked the emergence of the Anti-Administration party, which was then based almost exclusively in Southern states. Madison argued that repaying the debt rewarded speculators, and his proposal to repay only the original bondholders was defeated by a vote of 36 to 13. Hamilton's report also provided for the assumption of state debt by the federal government. Since Massachusetts, Connecticut and South Carolina owed nearly half of this debt, other states resented assumption. The House of Representatives passed the bill without assumption, but the Senate included that provision. The deadlock was broken by the Compromise of 1790, a deal between Madison and Secretary of State Jefferson on one hand and Hamilton on the other, which included both assumption and the location of the national capital in the South, which later became the District of Columbia.

In the summer of 1791, Jefferson and Madison brought the journalist Philip Freneau, a fiery editor of a New York City Anti-Federalist paper, to Philadelphia to start an Anti-Administration newspaper, the National Gazette. Jefferson gave the only State Department patronage position that he had to Freneau.

During the Second Congress, the Anti-Administration elements were more numerous and included about 32 House members out of 72. In 1791, Madison and Hamilton again clashed after the latter proposed the creation of a national bank. Southern planters opposed but urban merchants supported the idea. Madison called the Bank unconstitutional, but Hamilton successfully argued that the Necessary and Proper Clause of the Constitution allowed the creation of the bank.

The French Revolutionary Wars, which began in April 1792, hardened the differences between the factions. The Pro-Administration party generally supported the British or wished to remain neutral, but the Anti-Administration party supported the French. Jefferson joined the latter party in 1792, and it contested the election that year and was called the Republican Party. Politics now became more stable, with well-defined parties (Hamilton's Federalist Party and Jefferson's Republican Party). That created the First Party System, which lasted for two decades.
