= List of special elections to the United States Senate =

Special elections to the United States Senate are held to fill the vacancies that occur when a senator dies or resigns before the completion of their six-year term. Winners of these special elections typically serve the remainder of the term of the senator who has caused the vacancy. General elections to the U.S. Congress are held in November of even-numbered years. New Congresses convened on March 4 of the following year until 1934, and since then, new Congresses have begun on January 3 of the following year.

Because of the cost of conducting a special election, most states hold elections to fill a Senate vacancy in conjunction with the next general election, while some states, such as Alabama and Texas, allow for special elections to the Senate to be held before a general election (similar to special elections to the U.S. House of Representatives, though special elections are on a state-wide basis). Special elections can alter the balance of power in the Senate, as can temporary appointments.

== Appointments by governors ==
Laws per state for filling vacancies in the U.S. Senate Filled by gubernatorial appointment until next statewide election Filled by gubernatorial appointment, followed by proximate special election No gubernatorial appointment, filled by proximate special election ● Requires appointee from same party as the previous incumbent

Prior to ratification of the Seventeenth Amendment to the United States Constitution in 1913, most state legislatures elected senators, as well as replacement senators. Some states empowered their governor to make temporary appointments until the legislature was in session.

The Seventeenth Amendment now requires the governor of the state to issue a writ for a special election to fill a vacant Senate seat, but no timeframe is specified in the provision for when the special election is to be held. State legislatures may also empower the governor to fill a vacancy by a temporary appointment until the winner of the special election is certified. The constitution does not state how the temporary appointee is to be selected, or that there is no federal requirement that the appointee be of the same party, as it happened in New Jersey in 2013, and the state legislature can legislate as to how the replacement is to be selected.

Kentucky, North Dakota, Wisconsin, and Rhode Island do not empower the governor to make temporary appointments and require special elections. Between 2004 and 2008, Massachusetts denied the power of the governor to appoint a replacement; in 2004, the Democratic-controlled legislature wanted to limit the power of Republican governor Mitt Romney to appoint a successor to then-senator John Kerry if he were elected president that year. After the death of senator Ted Kennedy, the legislature chose to revert the rules to allow Democratic governor Deval Patrick to appoint a temporary replacement senator while awaiting the results of a special election to complete the existing term. Hawaii allows the governor to appoint an interim senator "who serves until the next regularly-scheduled general election, chosen from a list of three prospective appointees that the prior incumbent's political party submits". Alaska enacted conflicting legislation and a separate ballot referendum law in 2004, which went into effect immediately. It is uncertain if the Alaska governor may successfully appoint an interim senator to serve until the mandated special election occurs 60 to 90 days after the vacancy happens. The ballot-approved law fails to specifically authorize the governor to appoint, though the legislative law does.

Since 2021, Oklahoma permits its governor to appoint a successor who is of the same party as the previous senator for at least the preceding five years when the vacancy arises in an even-numbered year, only after the appointee chooses not to run in either a regular or special Senate election. Kentucky did away with the governor's appointment entirely in 2024, over Governor Andy Beshear's veto, and legislated only special elections to fill further Senate vacancies. In 2025, Oregon reinstated the gubernatorial power to appoint a successor also of the same party as the senator who vacates the seat, but disallows the governor to appoint oneself to the Senate. However, a special election must be called within several weeks or a few months of the vacancy.

== List of special elections ==
This is an incomplete list of special elections to the United States Senate. The list only includes vacancies that were filled by special election. Not included are those situations in which vacancies were only filled by appointment or general election, or new seats.

State (Class)	Original		Appointee		Election winner	
State (Class)	Senator	Vacancy event	Senator	Date	Senator	Date
Virginia (Class 1)	William Grayson (AA)	Died March 12, 1790	John Walker (PA)	March 31, 1790	James Monroe (AA)	November 9, 1790
New Jersey (Class 2)	William Paterson (PA)	Resigned November 13, 1790; Elected as governor	No appointment		Philemon Dickinson (PA)	November 23, 1790
Connecticut (Class 3)	William S. Johnson (PA)	Resigned March 4, 1791	No appointment		Roger Sherman (PA)	June 13, 1791
Virginia (Class 2)	Richard Henry Lee (AA)	Resigned October 8, 1792	No appointment		John Taylor (AA)	October 18, 1792
Maryland (Class 1)	Charles Carroll (PA)	Resigned November 30, 1792	No appointment		Richard Potts (PA)	January 10, 1793
Pennsylvania (Class 1)	Vacant	Failure to elect by March 4, 1791	No appointment		Albert Gallatin (AA)	February 28, 1793
Connecticut (Class 3)	Roger Sherman (PA)	Died July 23, 1793	No appointment		Stephen Mitchell (PA)	December 2, 1793
Pennsylvania (Class 1)	Albert Gallatin (AA)	Disqualified February 28, 1794	No appointment		James Ross (PA)	March 31, 1794
Virginia (Class 2)	John Taylor (AA)	Resigned May 11, 1794	No appointment		Henry Tazewell (AA)	November 18, 1794
Virginia (Class 1)	James Monroe (AA)	Resigned May 27, 1794	No appointment		Stevens T. Mason (AA)	November 18, 1794
Delaware (Class 1)	George Read (PA)	Resigned September 18, 1793	No appointment (Note: Kensey Johns was appointed on March 19, 1794, but the Senate refused to qualify him.)		Henry Latimer (PA)	February 7, 1795
Georgia (Class 2)	James Jackson (DR)	Resigned October 31, 1795	George Walton (F)	November 16, 1795	Josiah Tattnall (DR)	February 20, 1796
Connecticut (Class 1)	Oliver Ellsworth (F)	Resigned March 8, 1796	No appointment		James Hillhouse (F)	May 12, 1796
Massachusetts (Class 2)	Caleb Strong (F)	Resigned June 1, 1796	No appointment		Theodore Sedgwick (F)	June 11, 1796
Massachusetts (Class 1)	George Cabot (F)	Resigned June 9, 1796	No appointment		Benjamin Goodhue (F)	June 11, 1796
Connecticut (Class 3)	Jonathan Trumbull Jr. (F)	Resigned June 10, 1796	No appointment		Uriah Tracy (F)	October 13, 1796
Vermont (Class 1)	Moses Robinson (DR)	Resigned October 15, 1796	No appointment		Issac Tichenor (F)	October 18, 1796
New York (Class 3)	Rufus King (F)	Resigned May 23, 1796	No appointment		John Laurance (F)	November 9, 1796
New Jersey (Class 2)	Frederick Frelinghuysen (F)	Resigned November 12, 1796	No appointment		Richard Stockton (F)	November 12, 1796
Maryland (Class 1)	Richard Potts (F)	Resigned October 24, 1796	No appointment		John Eager Howard (F)	November 28, 1796
South Carolina (Class 2)	Pierce Butler (DR)	Resigned October 25, 1796	No appointment		John Hunter (DR)	December 8, 1796
Tennessee (Class 1)	Vacant	Failure to elect by March 4, 1797	William Cocke (DR)	August 2, 1797	Andrew Jackson (DR)	September 26, 1797
Tennessee (Class 2)	William Blount (DR)	Expelled July 8, 1797	No appointment		Joseph Anderson (DR)	September 26, 1797
Vermont (Class 1)	Isaac Tichenor (F)	Resigned October 17, 1797; Elected as governor	No appointment		Nathaniel Chipman (F)	October 17, 1797
Rhode Island (Class 2)	William Bradford (F)	Resigned October 1797	No appointment		Ray Greene (F)	November 13, 1797
Maryland (Class 3)	John Henry (F)	Resigned December 10, 1797; Elected as governor	No appointment		James Lloyd (F)	December 8, 1797
New York (Class 1)	Philip Schuyler (F)	Resigned January 3, 1798	No appointment		John Sloss Hobart (F)	January 11, 1798
Delaware (Class 2)	John Vining (F)	Resigned January 19, 1798	No appointment		Joshua Clayton (F)	January 19, 1798
New York (Class 1)	John Sloss Hobart (F)	Resigned April 16, 1798	William North (F)	May 5, 1798	James Watson (F)	August 17, 1798
South Carolina (Class 2)	John Hunter (DR)	Resigned November 26, 1798	No appointment		Charles Pinckney (DR)	December 6, 1798
Tennessee (Class 1)	Andrew Jackson (DR)	Resigned April 1, 1798	Daniel Smith (DR)	October 6, 1798	Joseph Anderson (DR)	December 12, 1798
Delaware (Class 2)	Joshua Clayton (F)	Died August 11, 1798	No appointment		William H. Wells (F)	January 17, 1799
New Jersey (Class 1)	John Rutherfurd (F)	Resigned November 26, 1798	Franklin Davenport (F)	December 5, 1798	James Schureman (F)	February 21, 1799
Virginia (Class 2)	Henry Tazewell (DR)	Died January 24, 1799	No appointment		Wilson C. Nicholas (DR)	December 5, 1799
New York (Class 1)	James Watson (F)	Resigned March 19, 1800	No appointment		Gouverneur Morris (F)	April 3, 1800
Massachusetts (Class 2)	Samuel Dexter (F)	Resigned May 30, 1800	No appointment		Dwight Foster (F)	June 6, 1800
New York (Class 3)	John Laurance (F)	Resigned August 1800	No appointment		John Armstrong Jr. (DR)	November 6, 1800
Massachusetts (Class 1)	Benjamin Goodhue (F)	Resigned November 8, 1800	No appointment		Jonathan Mason (F)	November 14, 1800
Maryland (Class 3)	James Lloyd (F)	Resigned December 1, 1800	No appointment		William Hindman (F)	December 12, 1800
New Jersey (Class 1)	James Schureman (F)	Resigned February 16, 1801	No appointment		Aaron Ogden (F)	February 28, 1801
Rhode Island (Class 2)	Ray Greene (F)	Resigned March 5, 1801	No appointment		Christopher Ellery (DR)	May 6, 1801
New Hampshire (Class 2)	Samuel Livermore (F)	Resigned June 12, 1801	No appointment		Simeon Olcott (F)	June 17, 1801
Vermont (Class 3)	Elijah Paine (F)	Resigned September 1, 1801	No appointment		Stephen R. Bradley (DR)	October 14, 1801
Maryland (Class 3)	William Hindman (F)	Retired November 19, 1801	No appointment		Robert Wright (DR)	November 12, 1801
South Carolina (Class 2)	Charles Pinckney (DR)	Resigned June 6, 1801	No appointment		Thomas Sumter (DR)	December 3, 1801
Pennsylvania (Class 3)	Peter Muhlenberg (DR)	Resigned June 30, 1801	No appointment		George Logan (DR)	December 17, 1801
Delaware (Class 1)	Henry Latimer (F)	Resigned February 28, 1801	Samuel White (F)	February 28, 1801	Samuel White (F)	January 14, 1802
New York (Class 3)	John Armstrong Jr. (DR)	Resigned February 5, 1802	No appointment		DeWitt Clinton (DR)	February 9, 1802
New Hampshire (Class 3)	James Sheafe (F)	Resigned June 14, 1802	No appointment		William Plumer (F)	June 17, 1802
South Carolina (Class 3)	John E. Colhoun (DR)	Died October 26, 1802	No appointment		Pierce Butler (DR)	November 4, 1802
Massachusetts (Class 2)	Dwight Foster (F)	Resigned March 2, 1803	No appointment		Timothy Pickering (F)	March 2, 1803
Tennessee (Class 1)	Vacant	Failure to elect by March 4, 1803	No appointment		Joseph Anderson (DR)	September 22, 1803
New Jersey (Class 1)	Vacant	Failure to elect by March 4, 1803	John Condit (DR)	September 1, 1803	John Condit (DR)	November 3, 1803
Virginia (Class 1)	Stevens T. Mason (DR)	Died May 10, 1803	John Taylor (DR)	June 4, 1803	Abraham B. Venable (DR)	December 7, 1803
New York (Class 3)	DeWitt Clinton (DR)	Resigned November 4, 1803	John Armstrong Jr. (DR)	December 8, 1803	John Smith (DR)	February 3, 1804
New York (Class 1)	Theodorus Bailey (DR)	Resigned January 16, 1804	No appointment		John Armstrong Jr. (DR)	February 3, 1804
Rhode Island (Class 1)	Samuel J. Potter (DR)	Died October 14, 1804	No appointment		Benjamin Howland (DR)	October 29, 1804
New York (Class 1)	John Armstrong Jr. (DR)	Resigned June 30, 1804	No appointment		Samuel L. Mitchill (DR)	November 9, 1804
Delaware (Class 2)	William H. Wells (F)	Resigned November 6, 1804	No appointment		James A. Bayard (F)	November 13, 1804
Virginia (Class 2)	Wilson C. Nicholas (DR)	Resigned May 22, 1804	Andrew Moore (DR)	August 11, 1804	William B. Giles (DR)	December 4, 1804
Virginia (Class 1)	Abraham B. Venable (DR)	Resigned June 7, 1804	William B. Giles (DR)	August 11, 1804	Andrew Moore (DR)	December 4, 1804
South Carolina (Class 3)	Pierce Butler (DR)	Resigned November 21, 1804	No appointment		John Gaillard (DR)	December 6, 1804
Kentucky (Class 3)	John Breckinridge (DR)	Resigned August 7, 1805	No appointment		John Adair (DR)	November 8, 1805
North Carolina (Class 2)	Vacant	Montford Stokes (DR) was elected but declined to serve	No appointment		James Turner (DR)	November 22, 1805
Georgia (Class 3)	James Jackson (DR)	Died March 19, 1806	No appointment		John Milledge (DR)	June 19, 1806
Kentucky (Class 3)	John Adair (DR)	Resigned November 18, 1806	No appointment		Henry Clay (DR)	November 19, 1806
Maryland (Class 3)	Robert Wright (DR)	Resigned November 12, 1806; Elected as governor	No appointment		Philip Reed (DR)	November 25, 1806
Vermont (Class 1)	Israel Smith (DR)	Resigned October 1, 1807; Elected as governor	No appointment		Jonathan Robinson (DR)	October 10, 1807
Connecticut (Class 3)	Uriah Tracy (F)	Died July 19, 1807	No appointment		Chauncey Goodrich (F) (Note: Samuel W. Dana (F) was elected but declined to serve.)	October 25, 1807
Rhode Island (Class 2)	James Fenner (DR)	Resigned September 1807; Elected as governor	No appointment		Elisha Mathewson (DR)	October 26, 1807
Georgia (Class 2)	Abraham Baldwin (DR)	Died March 4, 1807	George Jones (DR)	August 27, 1807	William H. Crawford (DR)	November 7, 1807
Massachusetts (Class 1)	John Quincy Adams (F)	Resigned June 8, 1808	No appointment		James Lloyd (F)	June 9, 1808
Ohio (Class 1)	John Smith (DR)	Resigned April 25, 1808	No appointment		Return J. Meigs Jr. (DR)	December 10, 1808
Pennsylvania (Class 1)	Samuel Maclay (DR)	Resigned January 4, 1809	No appointment		Michael Leib (DR)	January 9, 1809
Tennessee (Class 1)	Vacant	Failure to elect by March 4, 1809	Joseph Anderson (DR)	March 4, 1809	Joseph Anderson (DR)	April 11, 1809
Tennessee (Class 2)	Daniel Smith (DR)	March 31, 1809	No appointment		Jenkin Whiteside (DR)	April 11, 1809
Rhode Island (Class 1)	Francis Malbone (F)	Died June 4, 1809	No appointment		Christopher G. Champlin (F)	June 26, 1809
New Jersey (Class 2)	Aaron Kitchell (DR)	Resigned March 12, 1809	John Condit (DR)	March 21, 1809	John Condit (DR)	November 2, 1809
Georgia (Class 3)	John Milledge (DR)	Resigned November 14, 1809	No appointment		Charles Tait (DR)	November 27, 1809
Ohio (Class 3)	Edward Tiffin (DR)	Resigned March 3, 1809	Stanley Griswold (DR)	May 18, 1809	Alexander Campbell (DR)	December 12, 1809
Kentucky (Class 2)	Buckner Thruston (DR)	Resigned December 18, 1809	No appointment		Henry Clay (DR)	January 4, 1810
Delaware (Class 1)	Samuel White (F)	Died November 4, 1809	No appointment		Outerbridge Horsey (F)	January 12, 1810
New Hampshire (Class 3)	Nahum Parker (DR)	Resigned June 1, 1810	No appointment		Charles Cutts (F)	June 21, 1810
Connecticut (Class 1)	James Hillhouse (F)	Resigned June 10, 1810	No appointment		Samuel W. Dana (F)	June 1810
Ohio (Class 1)	Return J. Meigs Jr. (DR)	Resigned May 1, 1810; Elected as governor	No appointment		Thomas Worthington (DR)	December 15, 1810
South Carolina (Class 2)	Thomas Sumter (DR)	Resigned December 16, 1810	No appointment		John Taylor (DR)	December 18, 1810
Massachusetts (Class 2)	Vacant	Failure to elect by March 4, 1811	No appointment		Joseph Bradley Varnum (DR)	June 6, 1811
Tennessee (Class 2)	Jenkin Whiteside (DR)	Resigned October 8, 1811	No appointment		George W. Campbell (DR)	October 1, 1811
Rhode Island (Class 1)	Christopher G. Champlin (F)	Resigned October 2, 1811	No appointment		William Hunter (F)	October 28, 1811
Louisiana (Class 2)	Jean Noël Destréhan (DR)	Resigned October 1, 1812	Thomas Posey (DR)	October 8, 1812	James Brown (DR)	February 4, 1813
Connecticut (Class 3)	Chauncey Goodrich (F)	Resigned May 13, 1813; Elected as lieutenant governor	No appointment		David Daggett (F)	May 13, 1813
Delaware (Class 2)	James A. Bayard (F)	Resigned March 3, 1813	No appointment		William H. Wells (F)	May 21, 1813
Maryland (Class 3)	Vacant	Failure to elect by March 4, 1813	No appointment		Robert Henry Goldsborough (F)	May 21, 1813
New Hampshire (Class 3)	Vacant	Failure to elect by March 4, 1813	Charles Cutts (F)	April 2, 1813	Jeremiah Mason (F)	June 10, 1813
Massachusetts (Class 1)	James Lloyd (F)	Resigned May 1, 1813	Christopher Gore (F)	May 5, 1813	Christopher Gore (F)	June 11, 1813
Georgia (Class 2)	William H. Crawford (DR)	Resigned March 23, 1813	William B. Bulloch (DR)	April 8, 1813	William W. Bibb (DR)	November 6, 1813
Pennsylvania (Class 3)	Michael Leib (DR)	Resigned February 14, 1814	No appointment		Jonathan Roberts (DR)	February 24, 1814
New Hampshire (Class 2)	Nicholas Gilman (DR)	Died May 2, 1814	No appointment		Thomas W. Thompson (F)	June 24, 1814
Ohio (Class 1)	Thomas Worthington (DR)	Resigned December 1, 1814; Elected as governor	No appointment		Joseph Kerr (DR)	December 10, 1814
Kentucky (Class 2)	George M. Bibb (DR)	Resigned August 23, 1814	George Walker (DR)	August 30, 1814	William T. Barry (DR)	December 16, 1814
North Carolina (Class 3)	David Stone (DR)	Resigned December 24, 1814	No appointment		Francis Locke Jr. (DR)	December 30, 1814
Virginia (Class 1)	Richard Brent (DR)	Died December 30, 1814	No appointment		James Barbour (DR)	January 2, 1815
Kentucky (Class 3)	Jesse Bledsoe (DR)	Resigned December 24, 1814	No appointment		Isham Talbot (DR)	January 3, 1815
Tennessee (Class 1)	Vacant	Failure to elect by March 4, 1815	No appointment		George W. Campbell (DR)	October 10, 1815
Tennessee (Class 2)	George W. Campbell (DR)	Resigned February 11, 1814	Jesse Wharton (DR)	March 17, 1814	John Williams (DR)	October 10, 1815
North Carolina (Class 3)	Francis Locke Jr. (DR)	Resigned December 5, 1815	No appointment		Nathaniel Macon (DR)	December 5, 1815
Virginia (Class 2)	William B. Giles (DR)	Resigned March 3, 1815	No appointment		Armistead T. Mason (DR) (Note: John Wayles Eppes (DR) was elected but declined to serve.)	January 3, 1816
Maryland (Class 1)	Vacant	Failure to elect by March 4, 1815	No appointment		Robert Goodloe Harper (F)	January 29, 1816
Massachusetts (Class 1)	Christopher Gore (F)	Resigned May 30, 1816	No appointment		Eli P. Ashmun (F)	June 12, 1816
Georgia (Class 2)	William W. Bibb (DR)	Resigned November 9, 1816	No appointment		George Troup (DR)	November 13, 1816
North Carolina (Class 2)	James Turner (DR)	Resigned November 21, 1816	No appointment		Montfort Stokes (DR)	December 4, 1816
South Carolina (Class 2)	John Taylor (DR)	Resigned November 1816	No appointment		William Smith (DR)	December 4, 1816
Kentucky (Class 2)	William T. Barry (DR)	Resigned May 1, 1816	Martin D. Hardin (F)	November 3, 1816	Martin D. Hardin (F)	December 5, 1816
Maryland (Class 1)	Robert Goodloe Harper (F)	Resigned December 6, 1816	No appointment		Alexander C. Hanson (F)	December 20, 1816
New Hampshire (Class 3)	Jeremiah Mason (F)	Resigned June 16, 1817	No appointment		Clement Storer (DR)	June 27, 1817
Tennessee (Class 2)	Vacant	Failure to elect by March 4, 1817	John Williams (DR)	March 4, 1817	John Williams (DR)	October 2, 1817
Vermont (Class 3)	Dudley Chase (DR)	Resigned November 3, 1817	No appointment		James Fisk (DR)	November 4, 1817
Louisiana (Class 2)	William C. C. Claiborne (DR)	Died November 23, 1817	No appointment		Henry Johnson (DR)	January 12, 1818
Massachusetts (Class 1)	Eli P. Ashmun (F)	Resigned May 10, 1818	No appointment		Prentiss Mellen (F)	June 5, 1818
Vermont (Class 3)	James Fisk (DR)	Resigned January 8, 1818	No appointment		William A. Palmer (DR)	October 20, 1818
Georgia (Class 2)	George Troup (DR)	Resigned September 23, 1818	No appointment		John Forsyth (DR)	November 7, 1818
Tennessee (Class 1)	George W. Campbell (DR)	Resigned April 20, 1818	John Eaton (DR)	September 5, 1818	John Eaton (DR)	October 9, 1819
Georgia (Class 2)	John Forsyth (DR)	Resigned February 17, 1819	No appointment		Freeman Walker (DR)	November 6, 1819
Kentucky (Class 2)	John J. Crittenden (DR)	Resigned March 3, 1819	No appointment		Richard Mentor Johnson (DR)	December 10, 1819
Virginia (Class 2)	John Wayles Eppes (DR)	Resigned December 4, 1819	No appointment		James Pleasants (DR)	December 10, 1819
Maryland (Class 3)	Vacant	Failure to elect by March 4, 1819	No appointment		Edward Lloyd (DR)	December 14, 1819
Maryland (Class 1)	Alexander C. Hanson (F)	Died April 23, 1819	No appointment		William Pinkney (DR)	December 14, 1819
New York (Class 3)	Vacant	Failure to elect by March 4, 1819	No appointment		Rufus King (F)	January 8, 1820
Massachusetts (Class 1)	Prentiss Mellen (F)	Resigned May 15, 1820	No appointment		Elijah H. Mills (F)	June 12, 1820
Mississippi (Class 1)	Walter Leake (DR)	Resigned May 15, 1820	No appointment		David Holmes (DR)	August 30, 1820
Kentucky (Class 3)	William Logan (DR)	Resigned May 28, 1820	No appointment		Isham Talbot (DR)	October 19, 1820
Rhode Island (Class 2)	James Burrill Jr. (F)	Died December 25, 1820	No appointment		Nehemiah R. Knight (DR)	January 9, 1821
Tennessee (Class 1)	Vacant	Failure to elect by March 4, 1821	No appointment		John Eaton (DR)	September 27, 1821
Georgia (Class 2)	Freeman Walker (DR)	Resigned August 8, 1821	No appointment		Nicholas Ware (DR)	November 10, 1821
Pennsylvania (Class 1)	Vacant	Failure to elect by March 4, 1821	No appointment		William Findlay (DR)	December 10, 1821
Delaware (Class 1)	Vacant	Failure to elect by March 4, 1821	No appointment		Caesar A. Rodney (DR)	January 24, 1822
Ohio (Class 3)	William A. Trimble (DR)	Died December 13, 1821	No appointment		Ethan Allen Brown (DR)	January 29, 1822
Massachusetts (Class 2)	Harrison Gray Otis (F)	Resigned May 30, 1822	No appointment		James Lloyd (F)	June 5, 1822
Alabama (Class 3)	John W. Walker (DR)	Resigned December 12, 1822	No appointment		William Kelly (DR)	December 12, 1822
Maryland (Class 1)	William Pinkney (DR)	Died February 25, 1822	No appointment		Samuel Smith (DR)	December 17, 1822
Virginia (Class 2)	James Pleasants (DR)	Resigned December 15, 1822; Elected as governor	No appointment		John Taylor (DR)	December 18, 1822
New Jersey (Class 1)	Samuel L. Southard (DR)	Resigned March 3, 1823	No appointment		Joseph McIlvaine (DR)	November 12, 1823
Delaware (Class 2)	Vacant	Failure to elect by March 4, 1823	No appointment		Nicholas Van Dyke (F)	January 9, 1824
Delaware (Class 1)	Caesar A. Rodney (DR)	Resigned January 29, 1823	No appointment		Thomas Clayton (F)	January 13, 1824
Louisiana (Class 3)	James Brown (DR)	Resigned December 10, 1823	No appointment		Josiah S. Johnston (DR)	January 15, 1824
Connecticut (Class 2)	Elijah Boardman (DR)	Died August 18, 1823	Henry W. Edwards (DR)	October 8, 1823	Henry W. Edwards (DR)	May 5, 1824
Louisiana (Class 2)	Henry Johnson (DR)	Resigned May 27, 1824; Elected as governor	No appointment		Charles Bouligny (DR)	November 19, 1824
Illinois (Class 3)	Ninian Edwards (DR)	Resigned March 4, 1824	No appointment		John McLean (DR)	November 24, 1824
Georgia (Class 2)	Nicholas Ware (DR)	Died September 7, 1824	No appointment		Thomas W. Cobb (DR)	December 6, 1824
Virginia (Class 2)	John Taylor (DR)	Died August 21, 1824	No appointment		Littleton Tazewell (DR)	December 7, 1824
Connecticut (Class 3)	Vacant	James Lanman (DR) was re-elected in 1824, but the Senate refused to qualify him.	No appointment		Calvin Willey (AJ)	May 4, 1825
New Hampshire (Class 3)	Vacant	Failure to elect by March 4, 1825	No appointment		Levi Woodbury (J)	June 15, 1825
Tennessee (Class 2)	Andrew Jackson (J)	Resigned October 14, 1825	No appointment		Hugh Lawson White (J)	October 28, 1825
Rhode Island (Class 2)	James DeWolf (AJ)	Resigned October 31, 1825	No appointment		Asher Robbins (AJ)	October 31, 1825
New York (Class 3)	Vacant	Failure to elect by March 4, 1825	No appointment		Nathan Sanford (AJ)	January 14, 1826
Maryland (Class 3)	Edward Lloyd (J)	Resigned January 14, 1826	No appointment		Ezekiel F. Chambers (AJ)	January 24, 1826
Mississippi (Class 1)	David Holmes (J)	Resigned September 25, 1825; Elected as governor	Powhatan Ellis (J)	September 28, 1825	Thomas Reed (J)	January 28, 1826
Massachusetts (Class 2)	James Lloyd (AJ)	Resigned May 23, 1826	No appointment		Nathaniel Silsbee (AJ)	May 31, 1826
New Jersey (Class 1)	Joseph McIlvaine (AJ)	Died August 19, 1826	No appointment		Ephraim Bateman (AJ)	November 10, 1826
Alabama (Class 3)	Henry H. Chambers (J)	Died January 24, 1826	Israel Pickens (J)	February 17, 1826	John McKinley (J)	November 27, 1826
South Carolina (Class 3)	John Gaillard (J)	Died February 26, 1826	William Harper (J)	March 8, 1826	William Smith (J)	November 29, 1826
Delaware (Class 2)	Nicholas Van Dyke (AJ)	Died May 21, 1826	Daniel Rodney (AJ)	November 8, 1826	Henry M. Ridgely (J)	January 12, 1827
Massachusetts (Class 1)	Vacant	Failure to elect by March 4, 1827	No appointment		Daniel Webster (AJ)	June 8, 1827
Georgia (Class 2)	Thomas W. Cobb (J)	Resigned November 7, 1828	No appointment		Oliver H. Prince (J)	November 7, 1828
Ohio (Class 3)	William Henry Harrison (AJ)	Resigned May 20, 1828	No appointment		Jacob Burnet (AJ)	December 10, 1828
North Carolina (Class 3)	Nathaniel Macon (J)	Resigned November 14, 1828	No appointment		James Iredell Jr. (J)	December 15, 1828
Maine (Class 1)	Albion Parris (J)	Resigned August 26, 1828	No appointment		John Holmes (AJ)	January 15, 1829
New York (Class 1)	Martin Van Buren (J)	Resigned December 20, 1828; Elected as governor	No appointment		Charles E. Dudley (J)	January 15, 1829
New Jersey (Class 1)	Ephraim Bateman (AJ)	Resigned January 12, 1829	No appointment		Mahlon Dickerson (J)	January 30, 1829
Tennessee (Class 1)	John Eaton (J)	Resigned March 9, 1829	No appointment		Felix Grundy (J)	October 19, 1829
Georgia (Class 3)	John M. Berrien (J)	Resigned March 9, 1829	No appointment		John Forsyth (J)	November 9, 1829
North Carolina (Class 2)	John Branch (J)	Resigned March 9, 1829	No appointment		Bedford Brown (J)	December 9, 1829
Mississippi (Class 2)	Thomas Reed (J)	Died November 26, 1829	No appointment		Robert H. Adams (J)	January 6, 1830
Delaware (Class 1)	Louis McLane (J)	Resigned April 16, 1829	No appointment		Arnold Naudain (AJ)	January 7, 1830
Mississippi (Class 2)	Robert H. Adams (J)	Died July 2, 1830	George Poindexter (J)	October 14, 1830	George Poindexter (J)	November 18, 1830
Illinois (Class 2)	John McLean (J)	Died October 14, 1830	David J. Baker (J)	November 12, 1830	John M. Robinson (J)	December 11, 1830
Kentucky (Class 3)	Vacant	Failure to elect by March 4, 1831	No appointment		Henry Clay (NR)	November 10, 1831
Louisiana (Class 2)	Edward Livingston (J)	Resigned May 24, 1831	No appointment		George A. Waggaman (NR)	November 15, 1831
Pennsylvania (Class 1)	Isaac D. Barnard (J)	Resigned December 6, 1831	No appointment		George M. Dallas (J)	December 13, 1831
Indiana (Class 1)	James Noble (NR)	Died February 26, 1831	Robert Hanna Jr. (NR)	August 19, 1831	John Tipton (J)	January 3, 1832
Virginia (Class 2)	Littleton Tazewell (J)	Resigned July 16, 1832	No appointment		William C. Rives (J)	December 10, 1832
South Carolina (Class 2)	Robert Y. Hayne (N)	Resigned December 13, 1832; Elected as governor	No appointment		John C. Calhoun (N)	December 29, 1832
New York (Class 3)	William L. Marcy (J)	Resigned January 1, 1833; Elected as governor	No appointment		Silas Wright (J)	January 4, 1833
Georgia (Class 2)	George Troup (J)	Resigned November 8, 1833	No appointment		John Pendleton King (J)	November 21, 1833
Mississippi (Class 1)	Vacant	Failure to elect by March 4, 1833	No appointment		John Black (NR)	November 22, 1833
South Carolina (Class 3)	Stephen D. Miller (N)	Resigned March 2, 1833	No appointment		William C. Preston (N)	November 26, 1833
Pennsylvania (Class 1)	Vacant	Failure to elect by March 4, 1833	No appointment		Samuel McKean (J)	December 7, 1833
Louisiana (Class 3)	Josiah S. Johnston (NR)	Died May 19, 1833	No appointment		Alexander Porter (NR)	December 13, 1833
Virginia (Class 2)	William C. Rives (J)	Resigned February 22, 1834	No appointment		Benjamin W. Leigh (NR)	February 26, 1834
Missouri (Class 3)	Alexander Buckner (J)	Died June 6, 1833	Lewis F. Linn (J)	October 25, 1833	Lewis F. Linn (J)	November 20, 1834
Pennsylvania (Class 3)	William Wilkins (J)	Resigned June 30, 1834	No appointment		James Buchanan (J)	December 6, 1834
Georgia (Class 3)	John Forsyth (J)	Resigned June 27, 1834	No appointment		Alfred Cuthbert (J)	January 12, 1835
Maryland (Class 3)	Ezekiel F. Chambers (NR)	Resigned December 20, 1834	No appointment		Robert Henry Goldsborough (NR)	January 13, 1835
Maine (Class 2)	Peleg Sprague (NR)	Resigned January 1, 1835	No appointment		John Ruggles (J)	January 20, 1835
Illinois (Class 3)	Elias Kane (J)	Died December 12, 1835	No appointment		William Lee D. Ewing (J)	December 29, 1835
Louisiana (Class 2)	Vacant	Charles Gayarré (J) was elected but resigned due to ill health without having qualified	No appointment		Robert C. Nicholas (J)	January 13, 1836
Virginia (Class 1)	John Tyler (NR)	Resigned February 29, 1836	No appointment		William C. Rives (J)	March 4, 1836
Connecticut (Class 1)	Nathan Smith (NR)	Died December 6, 1835	John M. Niles (J)	December 21, 1835	John M. Niles (J)	May 6, 1836
New Hampshire (Class 3)	Isaac Hill (J)	Resigned May 30, 1836; Elected as governor	No appointment		John Page (J)	June 8, 1836
Delaware (Class 1)	Arnold Naudain (NR)	Resigned June 16, 1836	No appointment		Richard H. Bayard (NR)	June 17, 1836
North Carolina (Class 3)	Willie P. Mangum (NR)	Resigned November 26, 1836	No appointment		Robert Strange (J)	December 5, 1836
Virginia (Class 2)	Benjamin W. Leigh (NR)	Resigned July 4, 1836	No appointment		Richard E. Parker (J)	December 12, 1836
Maryland (Class 3)	Robert Henry Goldsborough (NR)	Died October 5, 1836	No appointment		John S. Spence (NR)	December 31, 1836
Delaware (Class 2)	John M. Clayton (NR)	Resigned December 29, 1836	No appointment		Thomas Clayton (NR)	January 9, 1837
Louisiana (Class 3)	Alexander Porter (NR)	Resigned January 5, 1837	No appointment		Alexandre Mouton (J)	January 12, 1837
Maine (Class 1)	Ether Shepley (J)	Resigned March 3, 1836	Judah Dana (J)	December 7, 1836	Reuel Williams (J)	February 22, 1837
Virginia (Class 2)	Richard E. Parker (D)	Resigned March 13, 1837	No appointment		William H. Roane (D)	March 14, 1837
Alabama (Class 3)	John McKinley (D)	Resigned April 22, 1837	No appointment		Clement C. Clay (D)	June 19, 1837
Georgia (Class 2)	John Pendleton King (D)	Resigned November 1, 1837	No appointment		Wilson Lumpkin (D)	November 22, 1837
Maryland (Class 1)	Joseph Kent (W)	Died November 24, 1837	No appointment		William Duhurst Merrick (W)	January 4, 1838
Mississippi (Class 1)	James F. Trotter (D)	Resigned July 10, 1838	Thomas H. Williams (D)	November 12, 1838	Thomas H. Williams (D)	January 30, 1839
Tennessee (Class 1)	Vacant	Ephraim H. Foster (W) was elected but declined to serve	No appointment		Felix Grundy (D)	November 19, 1839
Pennsylvania (Class 1)	Vacant	Failure to elect by March 4, 1839	No appointment		Daniel Sturgeon (D)	January 14, 1840
Michigan (Class 1)	Vacant	Failure to elect by March 4, 1839	No appointment		Augustus S. Porter (W)	January 20, 1840
New York (Class 1)	Vacant	Failure to elect by March 4, 1839	No appointment		Nathaniel P. Tallmadge (W)	January 27, 1840
Tennessee (Class 2)	Hugh Lawson White (W)	Resigned January 13, 1840	No appointment		Alexander O. Anderson (D)	January 27, 1840
Connecticut (Class 1)	Thaddeus Betts (W)	Died April 7, 1840	No appointment		Jabez W. Huntington (W)	May 4, 1840
North Carolina (Class 2)	Bedford Brown (D)	Resigned November 16, 1840	No appointment		Willie P. Mangum (W)	November 25, 1840
North Carolina (Class 3)	Robert Strange (D)	Resigned November 16, 1840	No appointment		William A. Graham (W)	November 25, 1840
Maryland (Class 3)	John S. Spence (W)	Died October 24, 1840	No appointment		John L. Kerr (W)	January 5, 1841
Delaware (Class 1)	Richard H. Bayard (W)	Resigned September 19, 1839	No appointment		Richard H. Bayard (W)	January 12, 1841
Massachusetts (Class 2)	John Davis (W)	Resigned January 5, 1841; Elected as governor	No appointment		Isaac C. Bates (W)	January 13, 1841
Virginia (Class 1)	Vacant	Failure to elect by March 4, 1839	No appointment		William C. Rives (W)	January 18, 1841
Massachusetts (Class 1)	Daniel Webster (W)	Resigned February 22, 1841	No appointment		Rufus Choate (W)	February 23, 1841
Alabama (Class 3)	Clement C. Clay (D)	Resigned November 15, 1841	No appointment		Arthur P. Bagby (D)	November 24, 1841
Rhode Island (Class 1)	Nathan F. Dixon (W)	Died January 29, 1842	No appointment		William Sprague (W)	February 5, 1842
Kentucky (Class 3)	Henry Clay (W)	Resigned March 31, 1842	No appointment		John J. Crittenden (W)	February 25, 1842
Louisiana (Class 3)	Alexandre Mouton (D)	Resigned March 1, 1842	No appointment		Charles M. Conrad (W)	March 10, 1842
New Hampshire (Class 3)	Franklin Pierce (D)	Resigned February 28, 1842	Leonard Wilcox (D)	March 1, 1842	Leonard Wilcox (D)	June 8, 1842
Vermont (Class 3)	Samuel Prentiss (W)	Resigned April 11, 1842	Samuel C. Crafts (W)	April 23, 1842	Samuel C. Crafts (W)	October 26, 1842
New Jersey (Class 1)	Samuel L. Southard (W)	Died June 26, 1842	William L. Dayton (W)	July 2, 1842	William L. Dayton (W)	October 28, 1842
South Carolina (Class 3)	William C. Preston (W)	Resigned November 29, 1842	No appointment		George McDuffie (D)	December 2, 1842
South Carolina (Class 2)	John C. Calhoun (D)	Resigned March 3, 1843	No appointment		Daniel Elliott Huger (D)	December 15, 1842
Maine (Class 1)	Reuel Williams (D)	Resigned February 15, 1843	No appointment		John Fairfield (D)	March 3, 1843
Tennessee (Class 1)	Felix Grundy (D)	Died December 19, 1840	Alfred O. P. Nicholson (D)	December 25, 1840 – February 7, 1842 (resigned)	Ephraim H. Foster (W)	October 17, 1843
Tennessee (Class 2)	Vacant	Failure to elect by March 4, 1841	No appointment		Spencer Jarnagin (W)	October 17, 1843
Rhode Island (Class 1)	William Sprague (W)	Resigned January 17, 1844	No appointment		John B. Francis (LO)	January 25, 1844
Louisiana (Class 3)	Vacant	Alexander Porter (W) was elected but died without having qualified	No appointment		Henry Johnson (W)	January 29, 1844
Arkansas (Class 2)	William S. Fulton (D)	Died August 15, 1844	No appointment		Chester Ashley (D)	November 8, 1844
Missouri (Class 3)	Lewis F. Linn (D)	Died October 3, 1843	David R. Atchison (D)	October 14, 1843	David R. Atchison (D)	November 20, 1844
Alabama (Class 2)	William R. King (D)	Resigned April 15, 1844	Dixon H. Lewis (D)	April 22, 1844	Dixon H. Lewis (D)	December 7, 1844
Illinois (Class 2)	Samuel McRoberts (D)	Died March 27, 1843	James Semple (D)	August 16, 1843	James Semple (D)	December 11, 1844
New York (Class 1)	Nathaniel P. Tallmadge (W)	Resigned June 17, 1844	Daniel S. Dickinson (D)	November 30, 1844	Daniel S. Dickinson (D)	January 18, 1845
New York (Class 3)	Silas Wright (D)	Resigned November 26, 1844; Elected as governor	Henry A. Foster (D)	November 30, 1844	John Adams Dix (D)	January 18, 1845
Arkansas (Class 2)	Chester Ashley (D)	Died April 29, 1848	William K. Sebastian (D)	May 12, 1848	William K. Sebastian (D)	November 17, 1848
Alabama (Class 2)	Dixon Hall Lewis (D)	Died October 24, 1848	Benjamin Fitzpatrick (D)	November 25, 1848	Jeremiah Clemens (D)	November 30, 1849
Massachusetts (Class 2)	Daniel Webster (W)	Resigned July 22, 1850	Robert Charles Winthrop (W)	July 30, 1850	Robert Rantoul Jr. (D)	January 14, 1851
New Hampshire (Class 3)	James Bell (R)	Died May 26, 1857	No appointment		Daniel Clark (R)	June 26, 1857
Tennessee (Class 1)	Vacant	Failure to elect by March 4, 1857	No appointment		Andrew Johnson (D)	October 8, 1857
South Carolina (Class 3)	Andrew Butler	Died May 25, 1857	No appointment		James Henry Hammond (D)	December 6, 1857
North Carolina (Class 3)	Asa Biggs	Resigned May 5, 1858	Thomas Lanier Clingman (D)	May 7, 1858	Thomas Lanier Clingman (D)	November 23, 1858
California (Class 3)	David C. Broderick (D)	Died September 16, 1859	Henry P. Haun (D)	November 3, 1859	Milton S. Latham (D)	January 11, 1860
California (Class 1)	Eugene Casserly (D)	Resigned November 29, 1873	No appointment		John S. Hager (D)	December 23, 1873
Alabama (Class 3)	George S. Houston (D)	Died December 31, 1879	Luke Pryor (D)	January 7, 1880	James L. Pugh (D)	November 24, 1880
New York (Class 1)	Thomas C. Platt (R)	Resigned May 16, 1881	No appointment		Warner Miller (R)	July 16, 1881
New York (Class 3)	Roscoe Conkling (R)	Resigned May 16, 1881	No appointment		Elbridge G. Lapham (R)	July 22, 1881
Arkansas (Class 2)	Augustus Garland (D)	Resigned March 6, 1885	No appointment		James H. Berry (D)	March 20, 1885
California (Class 1)	John Franklin Miller (R)	Died March 8, 1886	George Hearst (D)	March 23, 1886	Abram P. Williams (R)	August 4, 1886
California (Class 1)	George Hearst (D)	Died February 28, 1891	No appointment		Charles N. Felton (R)	March 19, 1891
California (Class 3)	Leland Stanford (R)	Died June 21, 1893	George C. Perkins (R)	July 26, 1893	George C. Perkins (R)	January 22, 1895
Mississippi (Class 2)	Edward C. Walthall (D)	Resigned January 24, 1894	No appointment		Anselm J. McLaurin (D)	February 7, 1894
Louisiana (Class 3)	Edward D. White (D)	Resigned March 12, 1894	Newton C. Blanchard (D)	March 12, 1894	Newton C. Blanchard (D)	May 16, 1894
Georgia (Class 2)	Alfred H. Colquitt (D)	Died March 26, 1894	Patrick Walsh (D)	April 2, 1894	Patrick Walsh (D)	November 2, 1894
North Carolina (Class 3)	Zebulon B. Vance	Died April 14, 1894	Thomas J. Jarvis (D)	April 19, 1894	Jeter C. Pritchard (D)	January 23, 1895
Michigan (Class 1)	Francis B. Stockbridge (R)	Died April 3, 1894	John Patton Jr. (R)	May 5, 1894	Julius C. Burrows (R)	January 24, 1895
Montana (Class 1)	Vacant	Failure to elect by March 4, 1893	No appointment		Lee Mantle (R)	January 16, 1895
Wyoming (Class 1)	Vacant	Failure to elect by March 4, 1893	No appointment		Clarence D. Clark (R)	January 23, 1895
Washington (Class 1)	Vacant	Failure to elect by March 4, 1893	No appointment		John L. Wilson (R)	February 19, 1895
Mississippi (Class 2)	Edward C. Walthall (D)	Died April 21, 1898	William V. Sullivan (D)	May 31, 1898	William V. Sullivan (D)	January 16, 1900
Alabama (Class 3)	Edmund Pettus (D)	Died July 27, 1907	No appointment		Joseph F. Johnston (D)	August 6, 1907
Pennsylvania (Class 1)	Philander C. Knox (R)	Resigned March 4, 1909	No appointment		George T. Oliver (R)	March 17, 1909
Mississippi (Class 2)	Anselm J. McLaurin (D)	Died December 22, 1909	James Gordon (D)	December 27, 1909	LeRoy Percy (D)	February 22, 1910
Louisiana (Class 3)	Samuel D. McEnery (D)	Died June 28, 1910	John Thornton (D)	August 27, 1910	John Thornton (D)	December 6, 1910
North Dakota (Class 3)	Martin N. Johnson (R)	Died October 12, 1909	Fountain L. Thompson (D)	November 10, 1909 – Jan. 31, 1910 (resigned)	Asle Gronna (R)	February 1, 1911
North Dakota (Class 3)	Martin N. Johnson (R)	Died October 12, 1909	William E. Purcell (D)	February 1, 1910	Asle Gronna (R)	February 1, 1911
West Virginia (Class 2)	Stephen Benton Elkins (R)	Died January 4, 1911	Davis Elkins (R)	January 9, 1911	Clarence Wayland Watson (D)	February 1, 1911
Iowa (Class 3)	Jonathan P. Dolliver (R)	Died October 15, 1910	Lafayette Young (R)	November 4, 1910	William S. Kenyon (R)	April 11, 1911
Georgia (Class 3)	Alexander S. Clay (D)	Died November 13, 1910	Joseph M. Terrell (D)	November 17, 1910	M. Hoke Smith (D)	July 12, 1911
Maine (Class 2)	William P. Frye (R)	Died August 8, 1911	No appointment		Obadiah Gardner (D)	April 2, 1912
Colorado (Class 3)	Charles J. Hughes Jr. (D)	Died January 11, 1911	No appointment		Charles S. Thomas (D)	January 15, 1913
Tennessee (Class 2)	Robert Love Taylor (D)	Died March 31, 1912	Newell Sanders (R)	April 11, 1912	William R. Webb (D)	January 23, 1913
Nevada (Class 1)	George S. Nixon (R)	Died June 5, 1912	William A. Massey (R)	July 1, 1912	Key Pittman (D)	January 23, 1913
Texas (Class 2)	Joseph Weldon Bailey (D)	Resigned January 3, 1913	Rienzi Melville Johnston (D)	January 4, 1913	Morris Sheppard (D)	January 23, 1913
Arkansas (Class 2)	Jeff Davis	Died January 3, 1913	John N. Heiskell (D)	January 6, 1913	William Marmaduke Kavanaugh (D)	January 23, 1913
Idaho (Class 3)	Weldon B. Heyburn (R)	Died October 17, 1912	Kirtland Irving Perky (D)	November 18, 1912	James H. Brady (R)	January 24, 1913
Illinois (Class 3)	William Lorimer (R)	Election invalidated July 13, 1912	No appointment		Lawrence Yates Sherman (R)	March 26, 1913
Seventeenth Amendment ratified April 8, 1913. All subsequent Senate elections are by popular vote.
Maryland (Class 1)	Isidor Rayner (D)	Died November 25, 1912	William P. Jackson (R)	November 29, 1912	Blair Lee (D)	November 4, 1913
Alabama (Class 3)	Joseph F. Johnston (D)	Died August 8, 1913	No appointment		Francis S. White (D)	May 11, 1914
Georgia (Class 2)	Augustus Octavius Bacon (D)	Died February 14, 1914	William S. West (D)	March 1, 1914	Thomas W. Hardwick (D)	November 3, 1914
Kentucky (Class 3)	William O. Bradley (R)	Died May 23, 1914	Johnson N. Camden (D)	June 16, 1914	Johnson N. Camden (D)	November 3, 1914
Maine (Class 2)	Edwin C. Burleigh (R)	Died June 16, 1916	No appointment		Bert M. Fernald (R)	September 11, 1916
Indiana (Class 3)	Benjamin F. Shively (D)	Died March 14, 1916	Thomas Taggart (D)	March 20, 1916	James Eli Watson (R)	November 7, 1916
Arkansas (Class 3)	James Paul Clarke (D)	Died October 1, 1916	No appointment		William F. Kirby (D)	November 7, 1916
Wisconsin (Class 3)	Paul O. Husting (D)	Died October 21, 1917	No appointment		Irvine L. Lenroot (R)	April 18, 1918
Oregon (Class 2)	Harry Lane (D)	Died May 23, 1917	Charles L. McNary (R)	May 29, 1917	Frederick W. Mulkey (R)	November 5, 1918
Nevada (Class 3)	Francis G. Newlands (D)	Died December 24, 1917	Charles B. Henderson (D)	January 12, 1918	Charles B. Henderson (D)	November 5, 1918
Idaho (Class 3)	James H. Brady (R)	Died January 13, 1918	John F. Nugent (D)	January 22, 1918	John F. Nugent (D)	November 5, 1918
New Jersey (Class 2)	William Hughes (D)	Died January 30, 1918	David Baird (R)	February 23, 1918	David Baird (R)	November 5, 1918
Louisiana (Class 3)	Robert F. Broussard (D)	Died April 12, 1918	Walter Guion (D)	April 22, 1918	Edward Gay (D)	November 5, 1918
Missouri (Class 3)	William J. Stone (D)	Died April 14, 1918	Xenophon P. Wilfley (D)	April 30, 1918	Selden P. Spencer (R)	November 5, 1918
South Carolina (Class 2)	Benjamin R. Tillman (D)	Died July 3, 1918	Christie Benet (D)	July 6, 1918	William P. Pollock (D)	November 5, 1918
New Hampshire (Class 3)	Jacob H. Gallinger (R)	Died August 17, 1918	Irving W. Drew (R)	September 2, 1918	George H. Moses (R)	November 5, 1918
Virginia (Class 2)	Thomas S. Martin (D)	Died November 12, 1919	Carter Glass (D)	November 18, 1919	Carter Glass (D)	November 2, 1920
Alabama (Class 3)	John H. Bankhead (D)	Died March 1, 1920	B. B. Comer (D)	March 5, 1920	J. Thomas Heflin (D)	November 2, 1920
New Mexico (Class 2)	Albert B. Fall (R)	Resigned March 3, 1921	Holm O. Bursum (R)	March 11, 1921	Holm O. Bursum (D)	September 20, 1921
Delaware (Class 1)	Josiah O. Wolcott (D)	Resigned July 2, 1921	T. Coleman du Pont (R)	July 7, 1921	Thomas F. Bayard Jr. (D)	November 7, 1922
Pennsylvania (Class 1)	Philander C. Knox (R)	Died October 12, 1921	William E. Crow (R)	October 17, 1921 – August 2, 1922 (died)	David A. Reed (R)	November 7, 1922
Pennsylvania (Class 1)	Philander C. Knox (R)	Died October 12, 1921	David A. Reed (R)	August 8, 1922	David A. Reed (R)	November 7, 1922
Pennsylvania (Class 3)	Boies Penrose (R)	Died December 31, 1921	George W. Pepper (R)	January 9, 1922	George W. Pepper (R)	November 7, 1922
Iowa (Class 2)	William S. Kenyon (R)	Resigned February 24, 1922	Charles A. Rawson (R)	February 24, 1922	Smith W. Brookhart (R)	November 7, 1922
Georgia (Class 3)	Thomas E. Watson (D)	Died September 26, 1922	Rebecca Felton (D)	November 21, 1922	Walter F. George (D)	November 7, 1922
Colorado (Class 3)	Samuel D. Nicholson (R)	Died March 24, 1923	Alva B. Adams (D)	May 17, 1923	Rice W. Means (R)	November 4, 1924
Connecticut (Class 3)	Frank B. Brandegee (R)	Died October 14, 1924	No appointment		Hiram Bingham III (R)	December 16, 1924
Idaho (Class 3)	Frank Gooding (R)	Died June 24, 1928	John Thomas (D)	June 30, 1928	John Thomas (R)	November 6, 1928
Ohio (Class 3)	Frank B. Willis (R)	Died March 30, 1928	Cyrus Locher (D)	April 5, 1928	Theodore E. Burton (R)	November 6, 1928
Ohio (Class 3)	Theodore E. Burton (R)	Died October 28, 1929	Roscoe C. McCulloch (R)	November 5, 1929	Robert J. Bulkley (D)	November 4, 1930
Arkansas (Class 3)	Thaddeus H. Caraway (D)	Died November 6, 1931	Hattie Caraway (D)	December 9, 1931	Hattie Caraway (D)	January 12, 1932
New Jersey (Class 2)	Dwight Morrow (R)	Died October 5, 1931	William Warren Barbour (R)	December 1, 1931	William Warren Barbour (R)	November 8, 1932
Georgia (Class 3)	William J. Harris (D)	Died April 18, 1932	John S. Cohen (D)	April 25, 1932	Richard Russell Jr. (D)	November 8, 1932
Vermont (Class 3)	Porter H. Dale (R)	Died October 6, 1933	Ernest W. Gibson (R)	November 21, 1933	Ernest W. Gibson (R)	January 16, 1934
Montana (Class 3)	Thomas J. Walsh (D)	Died March 4, 1933	John E. Erickson (D)	March 13, 1933	James E. Murray (D)	November 6, 1934
Tennessee (Class 2)	Cordell Hull (D)	Resigned March 4, 1933	Nathan L. Bachman (D)	March 4, 1933	Nathan L. Bachman (D)	November 6, 1934
New Mexico (Class 2)	Sam G. Bratton (D)	Resigned June 24, 1933	Carl A. Hatch (D)	October 10, 1933	Carl A. Hatch (D)	November 6, 1934
Louisiana (Class 2)	Huey Long (D)	Died September 10, 1935	Rose Long (D)	January 31, 1936	Rose Long (D)	April 21, 1936
Florida (Class 1)	Park Trammell	Died May 8, 1936	Scott Loftin (D)	May 26, 1936	Charles O. Andrews (D)	November 3, 1936
Florida (Class 3)	Duncan U. Fletcher	Died June 17, 1936	William Luther Hill (D)	July 1, 1936	Claude Pepper (D)	November 3, 1936
Arkansas (Class 3)	Joseph T. Robinson (D)	Died July 14, 1937	No appointment		John E. Miller (ID) (Note: Though he ran as an independent, Miller was so clearly a Democrat that most records indicate both Miller and his special election opponent as Democrats, including the Official Congressional Directory.)	November 15, 1937
Alabama (Class 3)	Hugo Black (D)	Resigned August 19, 1937	Dixie Graves (D)	August 20, 1937 – Jan. 10, 1938 (resigned)	Lister Hill (D)	April 26, 1938
Alabama (Class 3)	Hugo Black (D)	Resigned August 19, 1937	Lister Hill (D)	January 11, 1938	Lister Hill (D)	April 26, 1938
Tennessee (Class 2)	Nathan L. Bachman (D)	Died April 23, 1937	George L. Berry (D)	May 6, 1937	Tom Stewart (D)	April 26, 1938
New York (Class 1)	Royal Copeland (D)	Died June 17, 1938	No appointment		James M. Mead (D)	November 8, 1938
South Dakota (Class 3)	Herbert E. Hitchcock (D)	Resigned November 8, 1938	No appointment		Gladys Pyle (R)	November 8, 1938
Texas (Class 2)	Morris Sheppard (D)	Died April 9, 1941	Andrew Houston (D)	April 21, 1941	W. Lee O'Daniel (D)	June 28, 1941
Mississippi (Class 2)	Pat Harrison (D)	Died June 22, 1941	James Eastland (D)	June 30, 1941	Wall Doxey (D)	September 23, 1941
South Carolina (Class 2)	James F. Byrnes (D)	Resigned July 17, 1941	Alva Lumpkin (D)	July 22, 1941 – August 1, 1941 (died)	Burnet Maybank (D)	November 5, 1941
South Carolina (Class 2)	James F. Byrnes (D)	Resigned July 17, 1941	Roger Peace (D)	August 5, 1941	Burnet Maybank (D)	November 5, 1941
Colorado (Class 3)	Alva B. Adams (D)	Died December 1, 1941	Eugene Millikin (R)	December 20, 1941	Eugene Millikin (R)	November 3, 1942
West Virginia (Class 2)	Matthew M. Neely (D)	Resigned January 12, 1941	Joseph Rosier (D)	January 13, 1941	Hugh Ike Shott (R)	November 3, 1942
Nevada (Class 1)	Key Pittman (D)	Died November 10, 1940	Berkeley Bunker (D) (Note: Senator Bunker was appointed to fill the vacancy caused by the November 10, 1940, death of Key Pittman, who had just won re-election. Bunker was appointed both to complete the term that would end on January 3, 1941, and to begin the term that would end on January 3, 1947.)	November 27, 1940	James G. Scrugham (D)	November 3, 1942
Indiana (Class 3)	Frederick Van Nuys (D)	Died January 25, 1944	Samuel D. Jackson (D)	January 28, 1944	William E. Jenner (R)	November 7, 1944
Oregon (Class 2)	Charles L. McNary (R)	Died February 25, 1944	Guy Cordon (R)	March 4, 1944	Guy Cordon (R)	November 7, 1944
New Jersey (Class 1)	William Warren Barbour (R)	Died November 22, 1943	Arthur Walsh (D)	November 26, 1943	H. Alexander Smith (R)	November 7, 1944
Massachusetts (Class 2)	Henry Cabot Lodge Jr. (R)	Resigned February 3, 1944	Sinclair Weeks (R)	February 8, 1944	Leverett Saltonstall (R)	November 7, 1944
North Dakota (Class 2)	John Moses (D)	Died March 3, 1945	Milton Young (R)	March 12, 1945	Milton Young (R)	June 25, 1946
Alabama (Class 2)	John H. Bankhead II (D)	Died June 12, 1946	George R. Swift (D)	June 15, 1946	John Sparkman (D)	November 5, 1946
California (Class 1)	Hiram Johnson (R)	Died August 6, 1945	William F. Knowland (R)	August 26, 1945	William F. Knowland (R)	November 5, 1946
Connecticut (Class 1)	Francis T. Maloney (D)	Died January 16, 1945	Thomas C. Hart (R)	February 15, 1945	Raymond E. Baldwin (R)	November 5, 1946
Idaho (Class 2)	John Thomas (R)	Died November 10, 1945	Charles C. Gossett (D)	November 17, 1945	Henry Dworshak (R)	November 5, 1946
Kentucky (Class 2)	Happy Chandler (D)	Resigned November 1, 1945	William A. Stanfill (R)	November 19, 1945	John Sherman Cooper (R)	November 5, 1946
Ohio (Class 1)	Harold H. Burton (R)	Resigned September 30, 1945	James W. Huffman (D)	October 8, 1945	Kingsley A. Taft (R)	November 5, 1946
Virginia (Class 2)	Carter Glass (D)	Died May 28, 1946	Thomas G. Burch (D)	May 31, 1946	A. Willis Robertson (D)	November 5, 1946
Mississippi (Class 1)	Theodore G. Bilbo (D)	Died August 24, 1947	No appointment		John C. Stennis (D)	November 5, 1947
New York (Class 3)	Robert F. Wagner (D)	Resigned June 28, 1949	John Foster Dulles (R)	July 7, 1949	Herbert H. Lehman (D)	November 8, 1949
North Carolina (Class 2)	J. Melville Broughton (D)	Died March 6, 1949	Frank Porter Graham (D)	March 29, 1949	Willis Smith (D)	November 7, 1950
Kansas (Class 3)	Clyde M. Reed (R)	Died November 8, 1949	Harry Darby (R)	December 2, 1949	Frank Carlson (R)	November 7, 1950
Idaho (Class 2)	Bert H. Miller (D)	Died October 8, 1949	Henry Dworshak (R)	October 14, 1949	Henry Dworshak (R)	November 7, 1950
Connecticut (Class 3)	Brien McMahon (D)	Died July 28, 1952	William A. Purtell (R)	August 29, 1952	Prescott Bush (R)	November 4, 1952
Kentucky (Class 2)	Virgil Chapman (D)	Died March 8, 1951	Thomas R. Underwood (D)	March 19, 1951	John Sherman Cooper (R)	November 4, 1952
Michigan (Class 1)	Arthur Vandenberg (R)	Died April 18, 1951	Blair Moody (D)	April 23, 1951	Charles E. Potter (R)	November 4, 1952
Nebraska (Class 2)	Kenneth S. Wherry (R)	Died November 29, 1951	Fred A. Seaton (R)	December 10, 1951	Dwight Griswold (R)	November 4, 1952
California (Class 3)	Richard Nixon (R)	Resigned January 1, 1953; Elected as vice president	Thomas Kuchel (R)	January 2, 1953	Thomas Kuchel (R)	November 2, 1954
North Carolina (Class 2)	Willis Smith (D)	Died June 26, 1953	Alton Lennon (D)	July 15, 1953	Kerr Scott (D)	November 2, 1954
North Carolina (Class 3)	Clyde R. Hoey (D)	Died May 12, 1954	Sam Ervin (D)	June 5, 1954	Sam Ervin (D)	November 2, 1954
Nebraska (Class 1)	Hugh Butler (R)	Died July 1, 1954	Sam Reynolds (R)	July 7, 1954	Roman Hruska (R)	November 2, 1954
Nebraska (Class 2)	Dwight Griswold (R)	Died April 12, 1954	Eva Bowring (R)	April 26, 1954	Hazel Abel (R)	November 2, 1954
Kentucky (Class 2)	Alben Barkley (D)	Died April 30, 1956	Robert Humphreys (D)	June 25, 1956	John Sherman Cooper (R)	November 6, 1956
West Virginia (Class 1)	Harley M. Kilgore (D)	Died February 28, 1956	William Laird III (D)	March 13, 1956	Chapman Revercomb (R)	November 6, 1956
South Carolina (Class 2)	Strom Thurmond (D)	Resigned April 4, 1956	Thomas A. Wofford (D)	April 5, 1956	Strom Thurmond (D)	November 6, 1956
Texas (Class 1)	Price Daniel (D)	Resigned January 14, 1957	William Blakley (D)	January 17, 1957	Ralph Yarborough (D)	April 2, 1957
Wisconsin (Class 1)	Joseph McCarthy (R)	Died May 2, 1957	No appointment		William Proxmire (D)	August 27, 1957
West Virginia (Class 2)	Matthew M. Neely (D)	Died January 18, 1958	John D. Hoblitzell Jr. (R)	January 25, 1958	Jennings Randolph (D)	November 4, 1958
North Carolina (Class 2)	W. Kerr Scott (D)	Died April 16, 1958	B. Everett Jordan (D)	April 19, 1958	B. Everett Jordan (D)	November 4, 1958
North Dakota (Class 1)	William Langer (R)	Died November 8, 1959	Clarence Brunsdale (R)	November 19, 1959	Quentin Burdick (D)	June 28, 1960
Missouri (Class 1)	Thomas C. Hennings Jr. (D)	Died September 13, 1960	Edward V. Long (D)	September 23, 1960	Edward V. Long (D)	November 8, 1960
Oregon (Class 2)	Richard Neuberger (D)	Died March 9, 1960	Hall Lusk (D)	March 16, 1960	Maurine Neuberger (D)	November 8, 1960
Massachusetts (Class 1)	John F. Kennedy (D)	Resigned December 22, 1960; Elected as president	Benjamin A. Smith II (D)	December 27, 1960	Ted Kennedy (D)	November 6, 1962
Texas (Class 2)	Lyndon Johnson (D)	Resigned January 3, 1961; Elected as vice president	William Blakley (D)	January 3, 1961	John Tower (R)	May 27, 1961 (Note: A special election was held on April 4, 1961, while a runoff was held on May 27 after no candidate received a majority of the vote.)
New Hampshire (Class 2)	Styles Bridges (R)	Died November 26, 1961	Maurice J. Murphy Jr. (R)	December 7, 1961	Thomas McIntyre (D)	November 6, 1962
Kansas (Class 2)	Andrew Schoeppel (R)	Died January 21, 1962	James Pearson (R)	January 31, 1962	James Pearson (R)	November 6, 1962
Idaho (Class 2)	Henry Dworshak (R)	Died July 23, 1962	Len Jordan (R)	August 6, 1962	Len Jordan (R)	November 6, 1962
Wyoming (Class 2)	Edwin Keith Thomson (R) (Note: Senator-elect)	Died December 9, 1960	John J. Hickey (D)	January 3, 1961	Milward Simpson (R)	November 6, 1962
New Mexico (Class 1)	Dennis Chavez (D)	Died November 18, 1962	Edwin Mechem (R)	November 30, 1962	Joseph Montoya (D)	November 3, 1964
Oklahoma (Class 2)	Robert S. Kerr (D)	Died January 1, 1963	J. Howard Edmondson (D)	January 6, 1963	Fred R. Harris (D)	November 3, 1964
Tennessee (Class 2)	Estes Kefauver (D)	Died August 10, 1963	Herbert Walters (D)	August 20, 1963	Ross Bass (D)	November 3, 1964
South Carolina (Class 3)	Olin Johnston (D)	Died April 18, 1965	Donald Russell (D)	April 22, 1965	Fritz Hollings (D)	November 8, 1966
Virginia (Class 1)	Harry F. Byrd Sr. (D)	Resigned November 10, 1965	Harry F. Byrd Jr. (D)	November 12, 1965	Harry F. Byrd Jr. (D)	November 8, 1966
Alaska (Class 2)	Bob Bartlett (D)	Died December 11, 1968	Ted Stevens (R)	December 24, 1968	Ted Stevens (R)	November 3, 1970
Illinois (Class 3)	Everett Dirksen (R)	Died September 7, 1969	Ralph Tyler Smith (R)	September 17, 1969	Adlai Stevenson III (D)	November 3, 1970
Vermont (Class 1)	Winston L. Prouty (R)	Died September 10, 1971	Robert Stafford (R)	September 16, 1971	Robert Stafford (R)	January 7, 1972
Georgia (Class 2)	Richard Russell Jr. (D)	Died January 21, 1971	David H. Gambrell (D)	February 1, 1971	Sam Nunn (D)	November 7, 1972
New Hampshire (Class 3)	Failure to elect by January 3, 1975 (Note: The 1974 election result was contested. Eventually, the Senate declared the seat vacant. Norris Cotton, who had retired at the election, was subsequently appointed to the seat until a special election could be held.)		Norris H. Cotton (R)	August 8, 1975	John A. Durkin (D)	September 16, 1975
Minnesota (Class 1)	Hubert Humphrey (D)	Died January 13, 1978	Muriel Humphrey (D)	January 25, 1978	David Durenberger (R)	November 7, 1978
Alabama (Class 3)	James Allen (D)	Died June 1, 1978	Maryon Pittman Allen (D)	June 8, 1978	Donald Stewart (D)	November 7, 1978
Washington (Class 1)	Henry M. Jackson (D)	Died September 1, 1983	Daniel J. Evans (R)	September 8, 1983	Daniel J. Evans (R)	November 8, 1983
North Carolina (Class 3)	John P. East (R)	Died June 29, 1986	Jim Broyhill (R)	July 14, 1986	Terry Sanford (D)	November 8, 1986
Indiana (Class 3)	Dan Quayle (R)	Resigned January 3, 1989; Elected as vice president	Dan Coats (R)	January 3, 1989	Dan Coats (R)	November 6, 1990
Hawaii (Class 1)	Spark Matsunaga (D)	Died April 15, 1990	Daniel Akaka (D)	May 16, 1990	Daniel Akaka (D)	November 6, 1990
Pennsylvania (Class 1)	H. John Heinz III (R)	Died April 4, 1991	Harris Wofford (D)	May 9, 1991	Harris Wofford (D)	November 5, 1991
California (Class 1)	Pete Wilson (R)	Resigned January 7, 1991; Elected as governor	John Seymour (R)	January 10, 1991	Dianne Feinstein (D)	November 3, 1992
North Dakota (Class 1)	Quentin Burdick (D)	Died September 8, 1992	Jocelyn Burdick (D)	September 16, 1992	Kent Conrad (D)	December 4, 1992
Texas (Class 1)	Lloyd Bentsen (D)	Resigned January 20, 1993	Bob Krueger (D)	January 21, 1993	Kay Bailey Hutchison (R)	June 5, 1993 (Note: A special election was held on May 1, 1993, while a runoff was held on June 5 after no candidate received a majority of the vote.)
Tennessee (Class 2)	Al Gore (D)	Resigned January 3, 1993; Elected as vice president	Harlan Mathews (D)	January 3, 1993	Fred Thompson (R)	November 8, 1994
Oklahoma (Class 2)	David Boren (D)	Resigned November 15, 1994	No appointment (Note: The 1994 election in Oklahoma was held while David Boren was still in office; Boren had announced his resignation in May 1994.)		Jim Inhofe (R)	November 8, 1994
Oregon (Class 3)	Bob Packwood (R)	Resigned October 1, 1995	No appointment		Ron Wyden (D)	January 30, 1996
Kansas (Class 3)	Bob Dole (R)	Resigned June 11, 1996	Sheila Frahm (R)	June 11, 1996	Sam Brownback (R)	November 5, 1996
Georgia (Class 3)	Paul Coverdell (R)	Died July 18, 2000	Zell Miller (D)	July 24, 2000	Zell Miller (D)	November 7, 2000
Missouri (Class 1)	Mel Carnahan (D)	Died October 16, 2000	Jean Carnahan (D)	January 3, 2001	Jim Talent (R)	November 5, 2002
Wyoming (Class 1)	Craig L. Thomas (R)	Died June 4, 2007	John Barrasso (R)	June 25, 2007	John Barrasso (R)	November 4, 2008
Mississippi (Class 1)	Trent Lott (R)	Resigned December 18, 2007	Roger Wicker (R)	December 31, 2007	Roger Wicker (R)	November 4, 2008
Massachusetts (Class 1)	Ted Kennedy (D)	Died August 25, 2009	Paul G. Kirk (D)	September 24, 2009	Scott Brown (R)	January 19, 2010
Illinois (Class 3)	Barack Obama (D)	Resigned November 16, 2008; Elected as president	Roland Burris (D)	January 12, 2009	Mark Kirk (R)	November 2, 2010
Delaware (Class 2)	Joe Biden (D)	Resigned January 15, 2009; Elected as vice president	Ted Kaufman (D)	January 16, 2009	Chris Coons (D)	November 2, 2010
New York (Class 1)	Hillary Clinton (D)	Resigned January 21, 2009	Kirsten Gillibrand (D)	January 27, 2009	Kirsten Gillibrand (D)	November 2, 2010
West Virginia (Class 1)	Robert Byrd (D)	Died June 28, 2010	Carte Goodwin (D)	July 20, 2010	Joe Manchin (D)	November 2, 2010
Massachusetts (Class 2)	John Kerry (D)	Resigned February 1, 2013	Mo Cowan (D)	February 1, 2013	Ed Markey (D)	June 25, 2013
New Jersey (Class 2)	Frank Lautenberg (D)	Died June 3, 2013	Jeffrey Chiesa (R)	June 10, 2013	Cory Booker (D)	October 16, 2013
South Carolina (Class 3)	Jim DeMint (R)	Resigned January 1, 2013	Tim Scott (R)	January 2, 2013	Tim Scott (R)	November 4, 2014
Hawaii (Class 3)	Daniel Inouye (D)	Died December 17, 2012	Brian Schatz (D)	December 26, 2012	Brian Schatz (D)	November 4, 2014
Oklahoma (Class 3)	Tom Coburn (R)	Resigned January 3, 2015	No appointment (Note: The 2014 election in Oklahoma was held while Tom Coburn was still in office; Coburn had announced his resignation in January 2014.)		James Lankford (R)	November 4, 2014
Alabama (Class 2)	Jeff Sessions (R)	Resigned February 8, 2017	Luther Strange (R)	February 9, 2017	Doug Jones (D)	December 12, 2017
Minnesota (Class 2)	Al Franken (D)	Resigned January 2, 2018	Tina Smith (D)	January 3, 2018	Tina Smith (D)	November 6, 2018
Mississippi (Class 2)	Thad Cochran (R)	Resigned April 1, 2018	Cindy Hyde-Smith (R)	April 2, 2018	Cindy Hyde-Smith (R)	November 27, 2018 (Note: A special election was held on November 6, 2018, while a runoff was held on November 27 after no candidate received a majority of the vote.)
Arizona (Class 3)	John McCain (R)	Died August 25, 2018	Jon Kyl (R)	September 4, 2018 – December 31, 2018 (resigned)	Mark Kelly (D)	November 3, 2020
Arizona (Class 3)	John McCain (R)	Died August 25, 2018	Martha McSally (R)	January 3, 2019	Mark Kelly (D)	November 3, 2020
Georgia (Class 3)	Johnny Isakson (R)	Resigned December 31, 2019	Kelly Loeffler (R)	January 6, 2020	Raphael Warnock (D)	January 5, 2021 (Note: A special election was held on November 3, 2020, while a runoff was held on January 5, 2021, after no candidate received a majority of the vote.)
California (Class 3)	Kamala Harris (D)	Resigned January 18, 2021; Elected as vice president	Alex Padilla (D)	January 20, 2021	Alex Padilla (D)	November 8, 2022
Oklahoma (Class 2)	Jim Inhofe (R)	Resigned January 3, 2023	No appointment (Note: The 2022 election in Oklahoma was held while Jim Inhofe was still in office; Inhofe had announced his resignation in February 2022.)		Markwayne Mullin (R)	November 8, 2022
Nebraska (Class 2)	Ben Sasse (R)	Resigned January 8, 2023	Pete Ricketts (R)	January 12, 2023	Pete Ricketts (R)	November 5, 2024
California (Class 1)	Dianne Feinstein (D)	Died September 29, 2023	Laphonza Butler (D)	October 1, 2023	Adam Schiff (D)	November 5, 2024
Ohio (Class 3)	JD Vance (R)	Resigned January 10, 2025; Elected as vice president	Jon Husted (R)	January 21, 2025	Sherrod Brown (D)	November 3, 2026
Florida (Class 3)	Marco Rubio (R)	Resigned January 20, 2025	Ashley Moody (R)	January 21, 2025	Ashley Moody (R)	November 3, 2026
Minnesota (Class 1)	Amy Klobuchar (D)	Resigning late 2026	TBD (D)	TBD	TBD	November 2, 2027
Tennessee (Class 1)	Marsha Blackburn (R)	Resigning late 2026 or 2027	TBD (R)	TBD	TBD	November 7, 2028
State	Senator	Vacancy event	Senator	Date	Senator	Date
State	Original		Appointee		Election winner	

== See also ==
- List of appointed United States senators
- List of special elections to the United States House of Representatives
