= 1798–99 United States Senate elections =

- Dates vary by state
- Class 2

11 of the 32 seats in the United States Senate (plus special elections) 17 seats needed for a majority
	Majority party	Minority party
Party	Federalist	Democratic-Republican
Seats before	22	10
Seats after	23	9
Seat change	Steady	Steady
Seats up	5	6
Races won	5	6
- Federalist hold Democratic-Republican hold
Majority Party before election
Federalist
Elected Majority Party
Federalist

The 1798–99 United States Senate elections were held on various dates in various states. As these U.S. Senate elections were prior to the ratification of the Seventeenth Amendment in 1913, senators were chosen by state legislatures. Senators were elected over a wide range of time throughout 1798 and 1799, and a seat may have been filled months late or remained vacant due to legislative deadlock. In these elections, terms were up for the senators in Class 2.

They occurred in the middle of the presidency of John Adams, and had no net change in the political control of the Senate.

== Results summary ==
Senate party division, 6th Congress (1799–1801)

- Majority party: Federalist (22)
- Minority party: Democratic-Republican (9)
- Other parties: 0
- Total seats: 31

== Change in composition ==
=== Before the elections ===
After the January 19, 1798, election in Delaware.

DR_{6} Ky. Ran	DR_{5} Ga. Unknown	DR_{4}	DR_{3}	DR_{2}	DR_{1}				
DR_{7} N.C. Ran	DR_{8} S.C. Ran	DR_{9} Tenn. Retired	DR_{10} Va. Ran	F_{22} R.I. Ran	F_{21} N.J. Retired	F_{20} N.H. Ran	F_{19} Mass. Retired	F_{18} Del. Died	F_{17}
Majority →									F_{17}
F_{7}	F_{8}	F_{9}	F_{10}	F_{11}	F_{12}	F_{13}	F_{14}	F_{15}	F_{16}
F_{6}	F_{5}	F_{4}	F_{3}	F_{2}	F_{1}				

=== Results of the elections ===
DR_{6} Ky. Re-elected	DR_{5} Ga. Hold	DR_{4}	DR_{3}	DR_{2}	DR_{1}				
DR_{7} N.C. Hold	DR_{8} S.C. Re-elected	DR_{9} Tenn. Hold	DR_{10} Va. Re-elected	F_{22} N.J. Hold	F_{21} Mass. Hold	F_{20} Del. Hold	F_{19} R.I. Re-elected	F_{18} N.H. Re-elected	F_{17}
Majority →									F_{17}
F_{7}	F_{8}	F_{9}	F_{10}	F_{11}	F_{12}	F_{13}	F_{14}	F_{15}	F_{16}
F_{6}	F_{5}	F_{4}	F_{3}	F_{2}	F_{1}				

=== Beginning of the next Congress ===
DR_{6}	DR_{5}	DR_{4}	DR_{3}	DR_{2}	DR_{1}				
DR_{7}	DR_{8}	DR_{9}	V_{1} Va. Died	F_{22}	F_{21}	F_{20}	F_{19}	F_{18}	F_{17}
Majority →									F_{17}
F_{7}	F_{8}	F_{9}	F_{10}	F_{11}	F_{12}	F_{13}	F_{14}	F_{15}	F_{16}
F_{6}	F_{5}	F_{4}	F_{3}	F_{2}	F_{1}				

Key

DR_{#}	Democratic-Republican
F_{#}	Federalist
V_{#}	Vacant

== Race summaries ==
Except if/when noted, the number following candidates is the whole number vote(s), not a percentage.

=== Special elections during the 5th Congress ===
In these special elections, the winner was seated before March 4, 1799; ordered by election date.

State	Incumbent			Results	Candidates
State	Senator	Party	First elected	Results	Candidates
New York (Class 1)	Philip Schuyler	Federalist	1789 (Note: Incumbent lost in 1791 Senate election, but he was able to run again in 1797 and won.)	Incumbent resigned January 3, 1798, due to ill health. New senator elected January 11, 1798. Federalist hold. Winner later resigned; see below.	▌ ✓ John Sloss Hobart (Federalist) 100; ▌John Addison (Unknown) 25; ▌John Armstrong (Democratic-Republican) 4; ▌John Taylor (Democratic-Republican) 2; ▌James Watson (Federalist) 2; ▌James Cocliram (Unknown) 1
Delaware (Class 2)	John Vining	Federalist	1792	Incumbent resigned January 19, 1798. New senator elected January 19, 1798. Federalist hold. Winner died August 11, 1798; see below.	▌ ✓ Joshua Clayton (Federalist) 14; ▌James Sykes (Democratic-Republican) 10
New York (Class 1)	William North	Federalist	1798 (appointed)	Interim appointee served until winner qualified. New senator elected August 24, 1798. Federalist hold.	▌ ✓ James Watson (Federalist) 87; ▌John Taylor (Democratic-Republican) 57
South Carolina (Class 2)	John Hunter	Democratic- Republican	1796 (special)	Incumbent resigned November 26, 1798. New senator elected December 6, 1798. Democratic-Republican hold. New senator also elected to next term; see below.	▌ ✓ Charles Pinckney (Democratic-Republican); [data missing]
Tennessee (Class 1)	Daniel Smith	Democratic- Republican	1798 (appointed)	Interim appointee retired when successor qualified. New senator elected December 12, 1798. Winner qualified upon retirement from other Senate seat on March 3, 1799. Democratic-Republican hold.	▌ ✓ Joseph Anderson (Democratic-Republican) 17; ▌William Cocke (Democratic-Republican) 28; ▌Daniel Smith (Democratic-Republican) 15; ▌Andrew Jackson (Democratic-Republican) 1; ▌John Overton (Unknown) 1
Delaware (Class 2)	Joshua Clayton	Federalist	1798	Died August 11, 1798. New senator elected January 17, 1799. Federalist hold. Winner also elected to next term; see below.	▌ ✓ William H. Wells (Federalist) 14; ▌James Sykes (Democratic-Republican) 12
New Jersey (Class 1)	Franklin Davenport	Federalist	1798 (appointed)	Interim appointee served until winner qualified. New senator elected February 21, 1799 on the third ballot. Federalist hold.	▌ ✓ James Schureman (Federalist) 26; ▌Thomas Henderson (Federalist) 24; ▌Philemon Dickinson (Unknown) Eliminated in earlier ballot; ▌Jonathan Elmer (Federalist) Eliminated in earlier ballot

=== Races leading to the 6th Congress ===
In these regular elections, the winner was seated on March 4, 1799; ordered by state.

All of the elections involved the Class 2 seats.

State	Incumbent			Results	Candidates
State	Senator	Party	First elected	Results	Candidates
Delaware	Joshua Clayton	Federalist	1798	Incumbent died August 11, 1798. New senator elected January 17, 1799. Federalist hold. Winner was also elected to finish the current term, see above.	▌ ✓ William H. Wells (Federalist) 14; ▌James Sykes (Democratic-Republican)
Georgia	Josiah Tattnall	Democratic- Republican	1796	Incumbent retired or lost re-election. New senator elected January 18, 1799. Democratic-Republican hold.	▌ ✓ Abraham Baldwin (Democratic-Republican) 42; ▌Thomas P. Carnes (Federalist) 37
Kentucky	John Brown	Democratic- Republican	1792	Incumbent re-elected November 30, 1798.	▌ ✓ John Brown (Democratic-Republican) 36; ▌Benjamin Logan (Unknown) 22; ▌Stephen Ormsby (Democratic-Republican) 7
Massachusetts	Theodore Sedgwick	Federalist	1796	Incumbent retired to run for the U.S. House of Representatives. New senator elected June 14, 1798. Federalist hold.	▌ ✓ Samuel Dexter (Federalist) 102; Others 54
New Hampshire	Samuel Livermore	Federalist	1792	Incumbent re-elected December 21, 1798.	▌ ✓ Samuel Livermore (Federalist) 8; ▌Nay 4
New Jersey	Richard Stockton	Federalist	1796	Incumbent retired. New senator elected November 1, 1798. Federalist hold.	▌ ✓ Jonathan Dayton (Federalist) 26; ▌Jonathan Elmer (Federalist) 22
North Carolina	Alexander Martin	Democratic- Republican	1792	Incumbent lost re-election. New senator elected December 12, 1798, on the ninth ballot. Democratic-Republican hold.	▌ ✓ Jesse Franklin (Democratic-Republican) 89; ▌Benjamin Smith (Federalist) 78; ▌Alexander Martin (Democratic-Republican) Eliminated in earlier ballot; ▌Blake Baker Jr. (Unknown) Eliminated in earlier ballot
Rhode Island	Ray Greene	Federalist	1797 (special)	Incumbent re-elected November 1, 1798.	▌ ✓ Ray Greene (Federalist) Unanimous
South Carolina	Charles Pinckney	Democratic- Republican	1798	Incumbent re-elected December 6, 1798.	▌ ✓ Charles Pinckney (Democratic-Republican); [data missing]
Tennessee	Joseph Anderson	Democratic- Republican	1797 (special)	Incumbent retired when elected to the Class 1 seat (see above). New senator elected December 12, 1798. Democratic-Republican hold.	▌ ✓ William Cocke (Democratic-Republican) 28; ▌Joseph Anderson (Democratic-Republican) 17; ▌Daniel Smith (Democratic-Republican) 15; ▌Andrew Jackson (Democratic-Republican) 1; ▌John Overton (Unknown) 1
Virginia	Henry Tazewell	Democratic- Republican	1794 (special)	Incumbent re-elected in 1798. Incumbent died January 24, 1799, before the term began.	▌ ✓ Henry Tazewell (Democratic-Republican) 117; ▌James Madison (Democratic-Republican) 28; ▌John Marshall (Federalist) 13; ▌James Breckenridge (Federalist) 10; Others 9

=== Special elections during the 6th Congress ===
In this special election, the winner was seated after March 4, 1799, the beginning of the next Congress.

State	Incumbent			Results	Candidates
State	Senator	Party	First elected	Results	Candidates
Virginia (Class 2)	Vacant			Incumbent Henry Tazewell (DR) was re-elected in 1798 but died January 24, 1799, before the term began. New senator elected December 5, 1799 on the second ballot. Democratic-Republican gain.	▌ ✓ Wilson C. Nicholas (Democratic-Republican) 111; ▌John Page (Democratic-Republican) 49; ▌Ludwell Lee (Unknown) 1; ▌George K. Taylor (Unknown) 1; ▌James Wood (Federalist) 1

== See also ==
- 1798 United States elections
  - 1798–99 United States House of Representatives elections
- 5th United States Congress
- 6th United States Congress
