= List of elections in 1807 =

The following elections occurred in the year 1807.

== North America ==
=== United States ===
==== United States lieutenant gubernatorial ====
- 1807 Connecticut lieutenant gubernatorial election

==== United States gubernatorial ====
- 1807 Connecticut gubernatorial election
- 1807 Delaware gubernatorial election
- 1807 Georgia gubernatorial election
- 1807 Maryland gubernatorial election
- 1807 Massachusetts gubernatorial election
- 1807 New Hampshire gubernatorial election
- 1807 New Jersey gubernatorial election
- 1807 New York gubernatorial election
- 1807 North Carolina gubernatorial election
- 1807 Rhode Island gubernatorial election
- 1807 Tennessee gubernatorial election
- 1807 Vermont gubernatorial election
- 1807 Virginia gubernatorial election

==== United States Senate ====
- 1806 and 1807 United States Senate elections
- United States Senate election in New York, 1807

==== United States House of Representatives ====
- 1806–07 United States House of Representatives elections
- 1807 Delaware's at-large congressional district special election
- 1807 United States House of Representatives elections in Kentucky
- 1807 United States House of Representatives elections in Maryland
- 1807 Massachusetts's 12th congressional district special election
- 1807 United States House of Representatives elections in North Carolina
- 1807 South Carolina's 6th congressional district special election
- 1807 United States House of Representatives elections in Tennessee
- 1807 United States House of Representatives elections in Virginia

== Europe ==
=== United Kingdom ===
- 1807 United Kingdom general election
- 1807 Yorkshire election

== See also ==
- Category:1807 elections
