= 1798 United States Senate special elections in New York =

In 1798, there were two special elections for the U.S. Senate from New York:

- January 1798 United States Senate special election in New York
- August 1798 United States Senate special election in New York
