= January 1798 United States Senate special election in New York =

The first 1798 United States Senate special election in New York was held on January 11, 1798, by the New York State Legislature to elect a U.S. senator (Class 1) to represent the State of New York in the United States Senate.

== Background ==
Federalist Philip Schuyler was elected in 1797, and resigned on January 3, 1798, because of ill health.

At the State election in April 1797, Federalist majorities were elected to both houses of the 21st New York State Legislature which met from January 2 to April 6, 1798, at Albany, New York.

== Candidates ==
New York Supreme Court Justice John Sloss Hobart was the candidate of the Federalist Party.

State Senator John Addison, of Kingston, was the candidate of the Democratic-Republican Party.

John Armstrong, Judge John Tayler, State Senator James Watson, and Congressman James Cochran received "scattering" votes.

== Result ==
Hobart was the choice of both the State Senate and the State Assembly, and was declared elected.

January 1798 United States Senator special election result
| Office | House | Federalist | | Democratic-Republican | | Democratic-Republican | | Federalist | | Democratic-Republican | |
|---|---|---|---|---|---|---|---|---|---|---|---|
| U.S. Senator | State Senate (40 members) | John Sloss Hobart | 28 | John Addison | 2 | John Armstrong | 2 | James Cochran | 1 | | |
| | State Assembly (108 members) | John Sloss Hobart | 72 | John Addison | 23 | John Armstrong | 2 | James Watson | 2 | John Tayler | 2 |

== Aftermath ==
Hobart took his seat on February 2, but resigned on April 16, 1798, after his appointment to the United States District Court for the District of New York. William North was appointed by Governor John Jay to fill the vacancy temporarily, and took his seat on May 21, Congress being in session until July 16, 1798. The next State Legislature met in August 1798, and elected James Watson over John Tayler to serve for the remainder of the term.

== See also ==
- 1798 United States Senate special elections in New York
- August 1798 United States Senate special election in New York
