= 1807 Maryland gubernatorial election =

- November 9, 1807
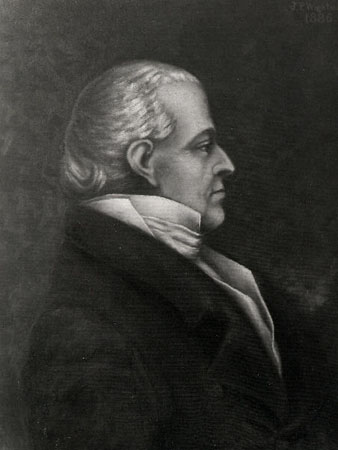

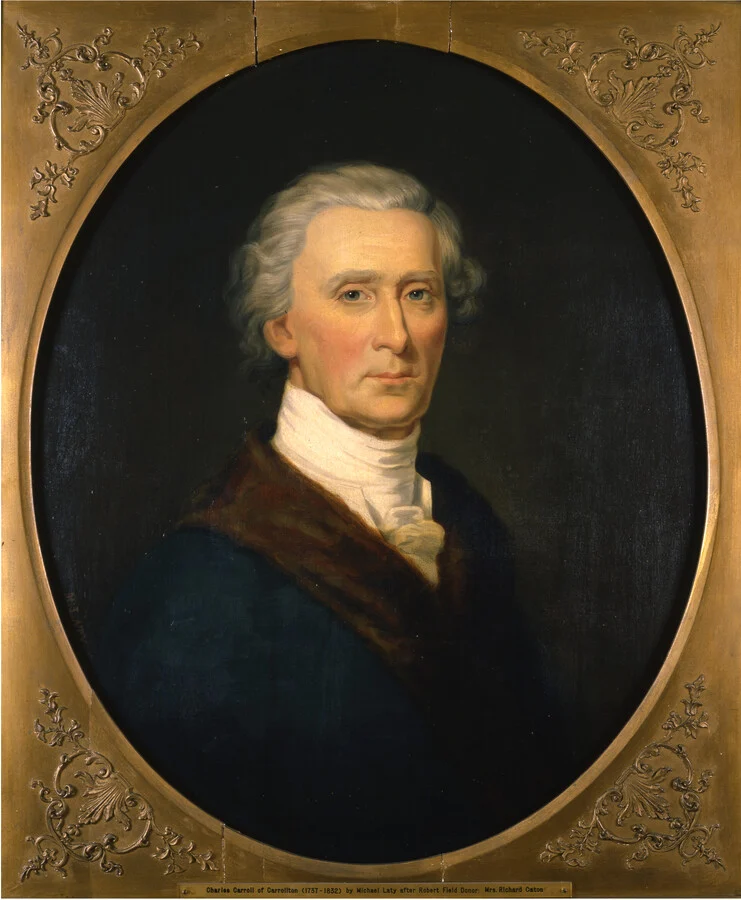

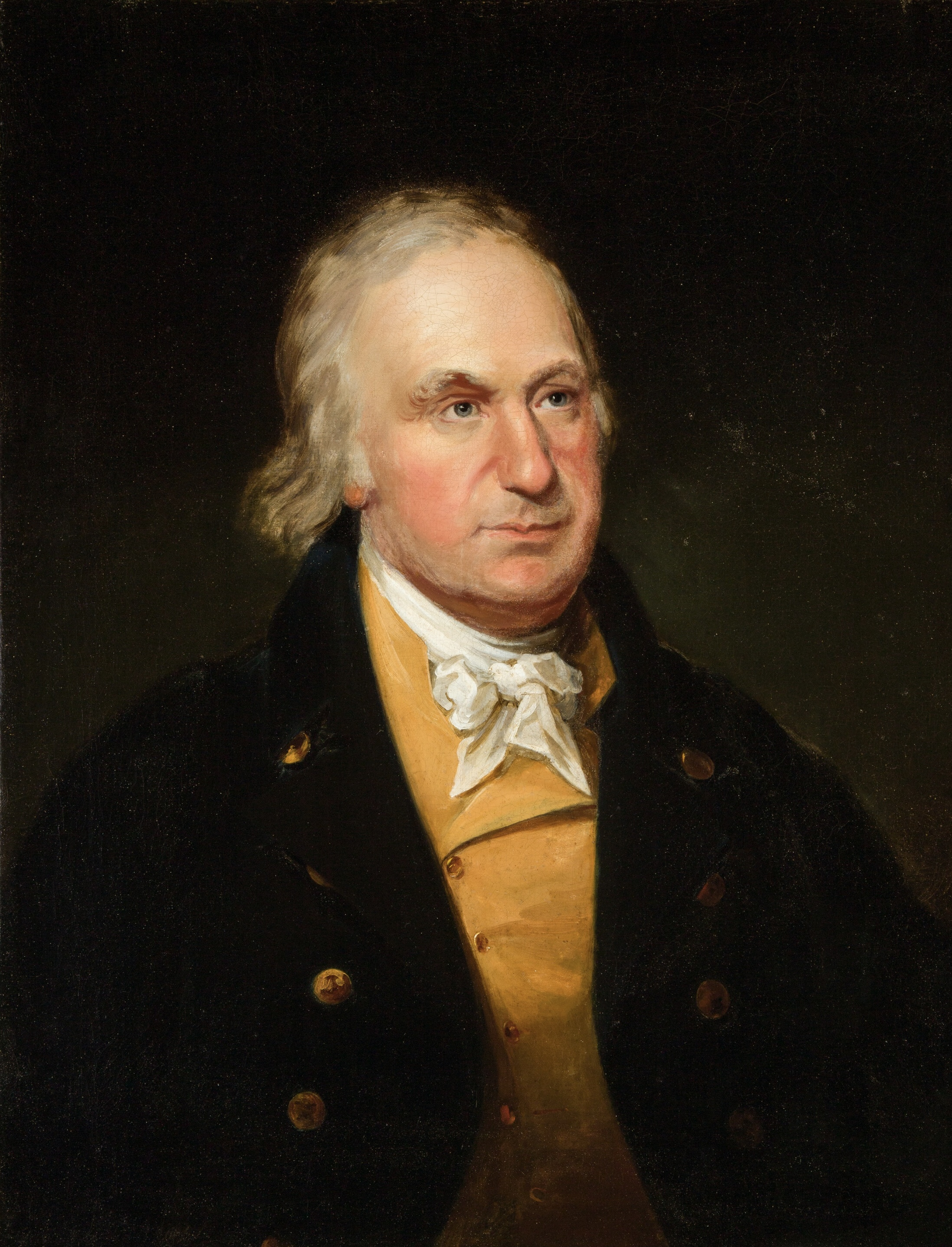
| Nominee | Robert Wright | Charles Carroll | John Eager Howard |
| Party | Democratic-Republican | Federalist | Federalist |
| Popular vote | 57 | 7 | 7 |
| Percentage | 80.28% | 9.86% | 9.86% |
Governor before election
Robert Wright
Democratic-Republican
Elected Governor
Robert Wright
Democratic-Republican

The 1807 Maryland gubernatorial election was held on November 9, 1807, in order to elect the governor of Maryland. Incumbent Democratic-Republican governor Robert Wright was re-elected by the Maryland General Assembly against Federalist candidates former United States senator Charles Carroll and former governor John Eager Howard in a near rematch of the previous election.

== General election ==
On election day, November 9, 1807, incumbent Democratic-Republican governor Robert Wright was re-elected by the Maryland General Assembly, thereby retaining Democratic-Republican control over the office of governor. Wright was sworn in for his second term on November 16, 1807.

=== Results ===
Maryland gubernatorial election, 1807
| Party | Candidate | Votes | % |
|---|---|---|---|
| Democratic-Republican | Robert Wright (incumbent) | 57 | 80.28 |
| Federalist | Charles Carroll | 7 | 9.86 |
| Federalist | John Eager Howard | 7 | 9.86 |
| Total votes | | 71 | 100.00 |
| Democratic-Republican hold | | | |
