= 1790 New Jersey gubernatorial election =

- October 29, 1790
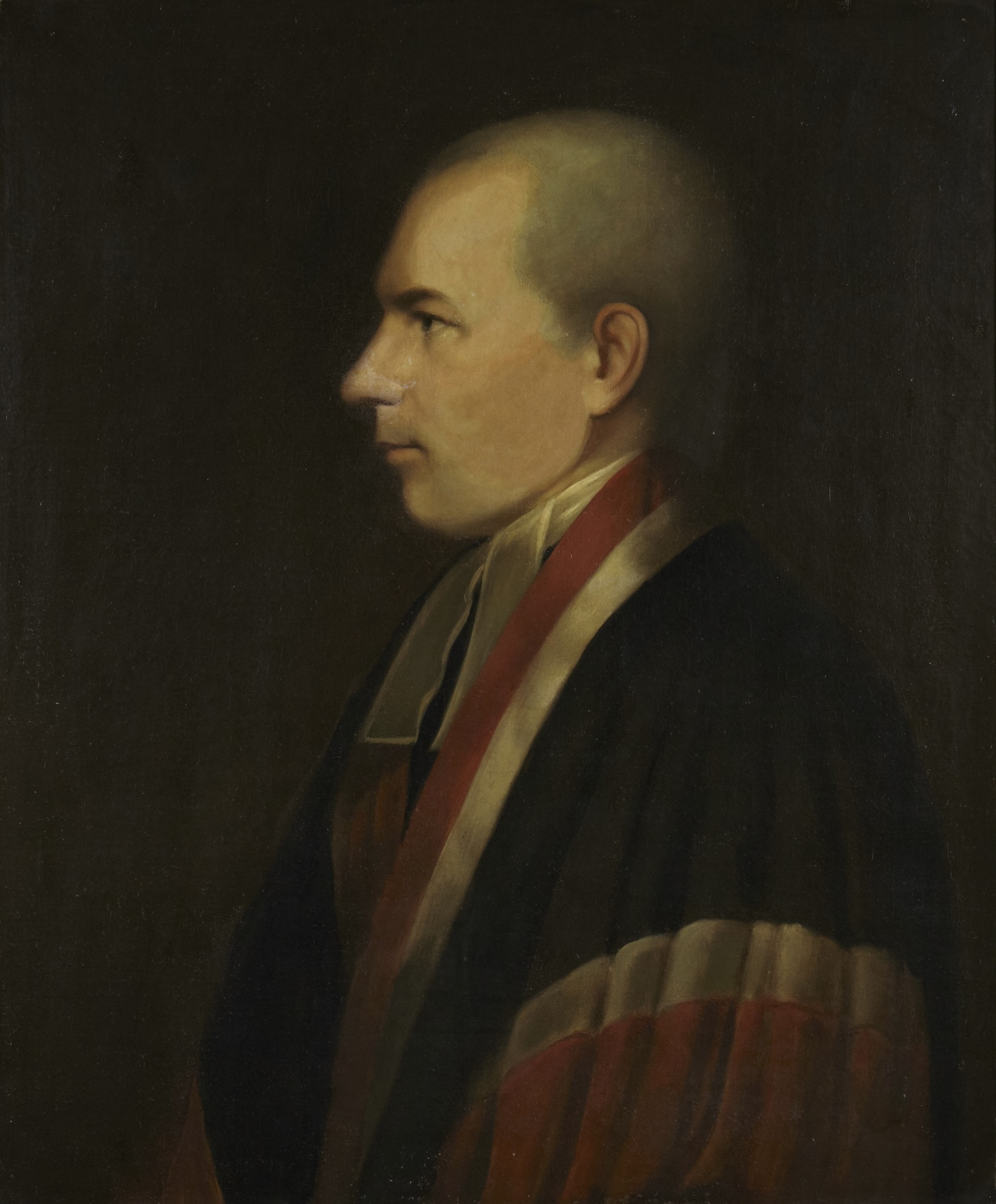
| Nominee | William Paterson |
| Party | Federalist |
| Popular vote | 37 |
| Percentage | 100.00% |
Governor before election
Elisha Lawrence (Acting)
Federalist
Elected Governor
William Paterson
Federalist

The 1790 New Jersey gubernatorial election was held on October 29, 1790, in order to elect the Governor of New Jersey. Federalist candidate and incumbent United States Senator from New Jersey William Paterson was unanimously elected by the New Jersey General Assembly as he ran unopposed.

== General election ==
On election day, October 29, 1790, Federalist candidate William Paterson was unanimously elected by the New Jersey General Assembly as he ran unopposed. Paterson was sworn in as the 2nd Governor of New Jersey that same day.

=== Results ===
New Jersey gubernatorial election, 1790
| Party | Candidate | Votes | % |
|---|---|---|---|
| Federalist | William Paterson | 37 | 100.00% |
| Total votes | | 37 | 100.00% |
| Federalist hold | | | |
