= 1807 Rhode Island gubernatorial election =

- April 1, 1807
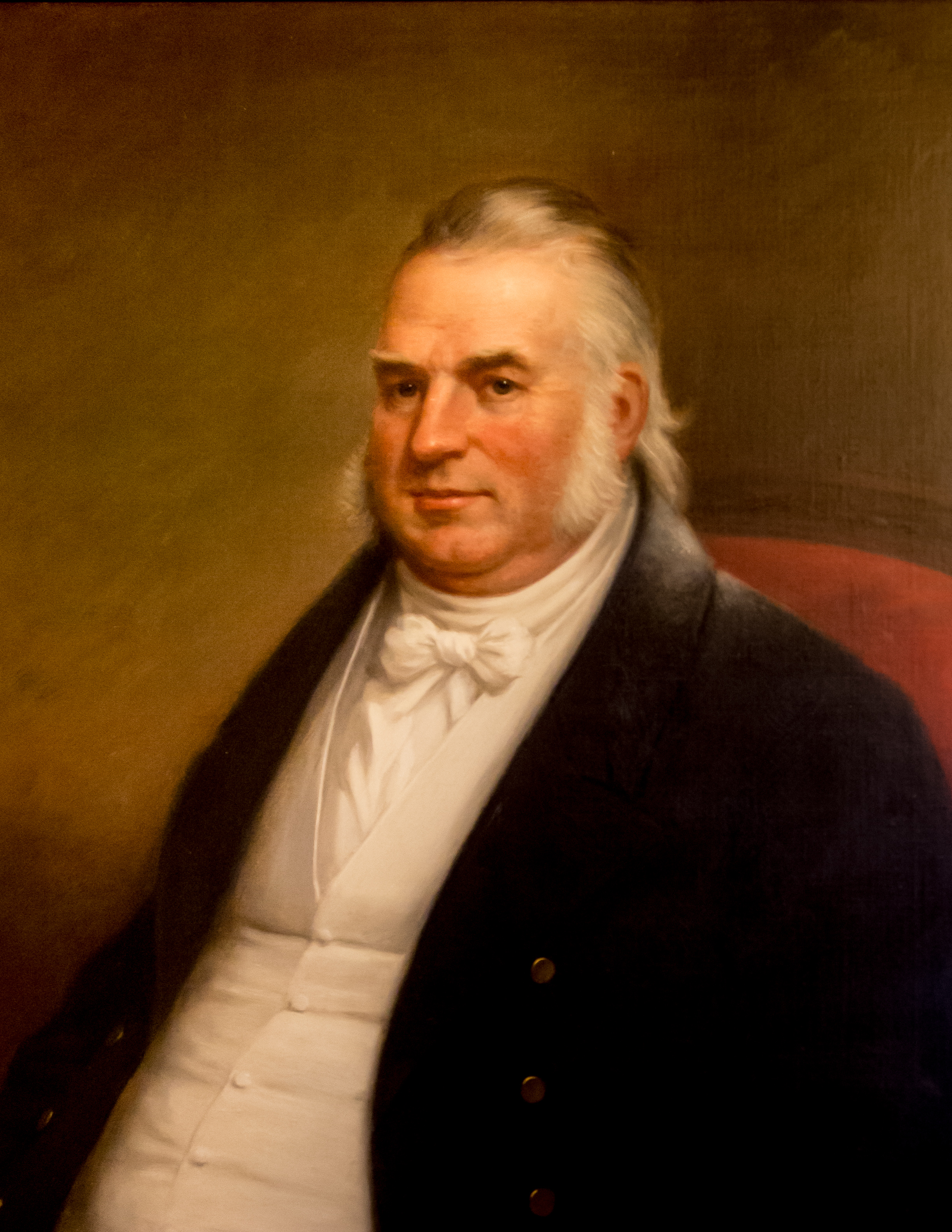

Nominee	James Fenner	Seth Wheaton
Party	Democratic-Republican	Democratic-Republican
Alliance	Federalist
Popular vote	2,564	1,268
Percentage	65.90%	32.59%
- County results Fenner: 50–60% 60–70% 80–90% Wheaton: 60–70%
Governor before election
Isaac Wilbour
Democratic-Republican
Elected Governor
James Fenner
Democratic-Republican

The 1807 Rhode Island gubernatorial election was held on April 1, 1807, in order to elect the governor of Rhode Island. Democratic-Republican nominee and incumbent United States senator from Rhode Island James Fenner defeated Federalist nominee Seth Wheaton.

== General election ==
On election day, April 1, 1807, Democratic-Republican nominee James Fenner won the election by a margin of 1,296 votes against his opponent Federalist nominee Seth Wheaton, thereby retaining Democratic-Republican control over the office of governor. Fenner was sworn in as the 7th governor of Rhode Island on May 6, 1807.

=== Results ===
Rhode Island gubernatorial election, 1807
Party	Candidate	Votes	%
Democratic-Republican	James Fenner	2,564	65.90
Democratic-Republican	Seth Wheaton	1,268	32.59
	Scattering	59	1.51
Total votes		3,891	100.00
Democratic-Republican hold			
