= William H. Wells =

American politician

William Hill Wells
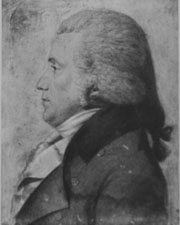

United States Senator from Delaware
- In office January 17, 1799 – November 6, 1804
- Preceded by: Joshua Clayton
- Succeeded by: James A. Bayard
- In office May 28, 1813 – March 3, 1817
- Preceded by: James A. Bayard
- Succeeded by: Nicholas Van Dyke

Member of the Delaware House of Representatives
- In office January 6, 1795 – January 7, 1800; January 1, 1811 – January 5, 1814; January 5, 1819 – January 4, 1820

Personal details
- Born: William Hill Wells; January 7, 1769 Burlington, Province of New Jersey
- Died: March 11, 1829 (aged 60) Dagsboro, Delaware, US
- Party: Federalist
- Spouse: Elizabeth Dagworthy Aydelott
- Profession: Lawyer

William Hill Wells (January 7, 1769 – March 11, 1829) was a lawyer and politician from Dagsboro, in Sussex County, Delaware. He was a member of the Federalist Party, who served in the Delaware General Assembly and as U.S. Senator from Delaware.

== Early life and family ==
Wells was born in Burlington, New Jersey. His family came to Sussex County when he was young, and his father began a successful mercantile business at Dagsboro, which the younger Wells continued. He was the son of Rachel (Hill) and Richard Welles, who was born in Kingston upon Hull in England. His marriage to Elizabeth Dagworthy Aydelott, the ward of Revolutionary War General John Dagworthy, greatly increased his wealth, as she had inherited large tracts of Sussex County timberlands. Meanwhile he studied the law, was admitted to the Delaware Bar in 1791, and practiced at Georgetown, Delaware, eventually expanding his practice to Dover, Delaware.

Actor, playwright and director Orson Welles was a great-great-grandson of Wells.

== Professional and political career ==
Wells represented Sussex County for several years in the Delaware General Assembly, initially serving in the State House from the 1795 session through the 1799 session. He was then elected as a Federalist to the United States Senate to fill the vacancy caused by the death of Joshua Clayton, and served from January 17, 1799, until November 6, 1804. During this time he joined his Federalist colleagues in opposition to the Louisiana Purchase. He resigned before the completion of his term to seek his fortune in the oil business in northern Pennsylvania. He returned to the State House for the 1811 and 1812 sessions, and spent the 1813 session in the State Senate. He was again elected as a Federalist to the United States Senate to fill the vacancy caused by the resignation of James A. Bayard, and served from May 28, 1813, to March 3, 1817. Finally, he served once more in the 1819 session of the State House.

All the while he continued the practice of law in Dagsboro and Millsboro, Delaware, and became heavily involved in the oil business in Pennsylvania.

== Death and legacy ==
Wells died near Dagsboro, Delaware, and is buried in the Prince George's Chapel churchyard, in Dagsboro.

== Almanac ==
Elections were held the first Tuesday of October. Members of the Delaware General Assembly took office on the first Tuesday of January, with the State Senate serving a three-year term, and the State House a one-year term. The General Assembly chose the U.S. Senators, who took office March 4 for a six-year term. In this case he was initially completing the existing term, the vacancy caused by the death of Joshua Clayton, and later completing the existing term the vacancy caused by the resignation of James A. Bayard.

Public offices
Office	Type	Location	Began office	Ended office	Notes
State Representative	Legislature	Dover	January 6, 1795	January 5, 1796	
State Representative	Legislature	Dover	January 5, 1796	January 3, 1797	
State Representative	Legislature	Dover	January 3, 1797	January 2, 1798	
State Representative	Legislature	Dover	January 2, 1798	January 1, 1799	
State Representative	Legislature	Dover	January 1, 1799	January 7, 1800	
U.S. Senator	Legislature	Philadelphia	January 17, 1799	March 3, 1799	(Note: Elected to fill the vacancy caused by the death of Joshua Clayton, seated February 4, 1799.)
U.S. Senator	Legislature	Washington (Note: The U.S. Senate met at Philadelphia until May 14, 1800.)	March 4, 1799	November 6, 1804	(Note: Resigned.)
State Representative	Legislature	Dover	January 1, 1811	January 7, 1812	
State Representative	Legislature	Dover	January 7, 1812	January 6, 1813	
State Senator	Legislature	Dover	January 6, 1813	January 5, 1814	
U.S. Senator	Legislature	Washington	May 28, 1813	March 3, 1817	(Note: Elected to fill vacancy caused by resignation of James A. Bayard in preceding Congress, seated June 10, 1813.)
State Representative	Legislature	Dover	January 5, 1819	January 4, 1820	

Delaware General Assembly service
Dates	Assembly	Chamber	Majority	Governor	Committees	District
1795	19th	State House	Federalist	Joshua Clayton		Sussex at-large
1796	20th	State House	Federalist	Gunning Bedford Sr.		Sussex at-large
1797	21st	State House	Federalist	Gunning Bedford Sr.		Sussex at-large
1798	22nd	State House	Federalist	Daniel Rogers		Sussex at-large
1799	23rd	State House	Federalist	Richard Bassett		Sussex at-large
1811	35th	State House	Federalist	Joseph Haslet		Sussex at-large
1812	36th	State House	Federalist	Joseph Haslet		Sussex at-large
1813	37th	State Senate	Federalist	Joseph Haslet		Sussex at-large
1819	43rd	State House	Federalist	John Clark		Sussex at-large

United States congressional service
Dates	Congress	Chamber	Majority	President	Committees	Class/District
1797–1799	5th	U.S. Senate	Federalist	John Adams		class 2
1799–1801	6th	U.S. Senate	Federalist	John Adams		class 2
1801–1803	7th	U.S. Senate	Republican	Thomas Jefferson		class 2
1803–1805	8th	U.S. Senate	Republican	Thomas Jefferson		class 2
1813–1815	13th	U.S. Senate	Republican	James Madison		class 2
1815–1817	14th	U.S. Senate	Republican	James Madison		class 2

== Sources ==
- Martin, Roger A. (1995). Memoirs of the Senate. Newark: Roger A. Martin.
- Munroe, John A. (1954). Federalist Delaware 1775–1815. New Brunswick: Rutgers University.
- Wilson, W. Emerson (1969). Forgotten Heroes of Delaware. Cambridge, MA: Deltos Publishing Company.

== Places with more information ==
- Delaware Historical Society; website; 505 Market St, Wilmington, Delaware; (302) 655-7161.
- University of Delaware; Library website; 181 South College Ave, Newark, Delaware; (302) 831–2965.

U.S. Senate
Preceded by Joshua Clayton	U.S. Senator from Delaware; 1799–1804	Succeeded by James A. Bayard
Preceded by James A. Bayard	U.S. Senator from Delaware; 1813–1817	Succeeded by Nicholas Van Dyke
