= August 1798 United States Senate special election in New York =

- August 17, 1798
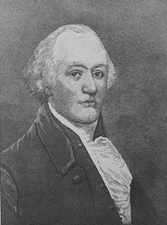

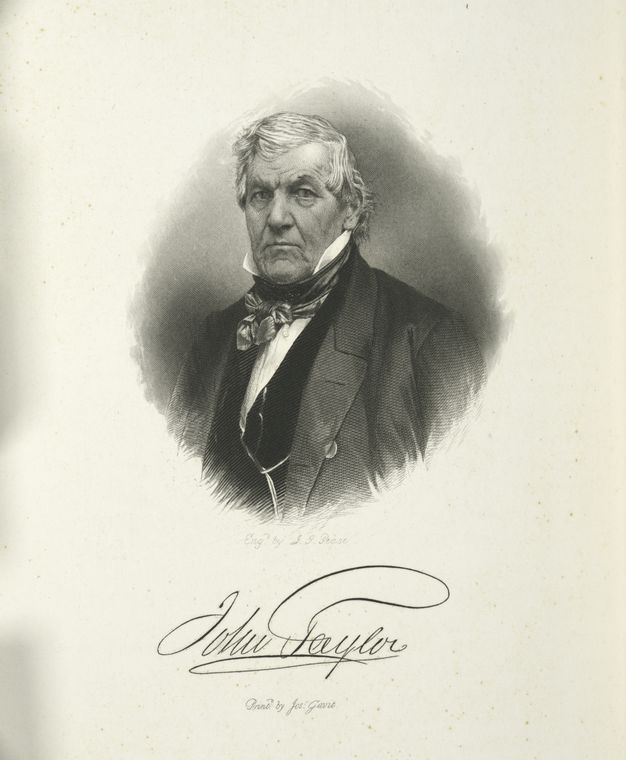
Nominee	James Watson	John Tayler
Party	Federalist	Democratic-Republican
Leg. vote	30 (Senate); 57 (Assembly)	9 (Senate); 48 (Assembly)
Percentage	69.77% (Senate); 52.78% (Assembly)	20.93% (Senate); 44.44% (Assembly)
Senator before election
William North
Federalist
Elected Senator
James Watson
Federalist

The second 1798 United States Senate special election in New York was held on August 17, 1798, by the New York State Legislature to elect a U.S. senator (Class 1) to represent the State of New York in the United States Senate.

== Background ==
Federalist John Sloss Hobart had been elected in January 1798 for the remainder of Philip Schuyler's term (1797–1803) but had resigned on April 16 after his appointment to the United States District Court for the District of New York. Federalist William North was appointed by Governor John Jay to fill the vacancy temporarily, and took his seat on May 21, Congress being in session until July 16, 1798.

At the State election in April 1798, Federalist majorities were elected to both houses of the 22nd New York State Legislature which met from August 9 to 17, 1798; and from January 2 to April 3, 1799, at Albany, New York.

== Candidates ==
Ex-Speaker James Watson, a State Senator until the previous session, was the candidate of the Federalist Party.

First Judge of the Albany County Court John Tayler was the candidate of the Democratic-Republican Party.

== Result ==
Watson was the choice of both the State Senate and the State Assembly, and was declared elected.

August 1798 United States Senator special election result
Office	House	Federalist		Democratic-Republican	
U.S. Senator	State Senate (43 members)	James Watson	30	John Tayler	9
	State Assembly (108 members)	James Watson	57	John Tayler	48

== Aftermath ==
Watson took his seat on December 11, 1798, but resigned on March 19, 1800, after his appointment as Naval Officer of the Port of New York. The State Legislature held a special election in April 1800, and elected Gouverneur Morris to fill the vacancy.

== See also ==
- 1798 United States Senate special elections in New York
- January 1798 United States Senate special election in New York
