= James Watson (New York politician) =

American politician

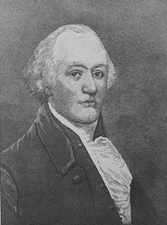

United States Senator from New York
- In office August 17, 1798 – March 19, 1800
- Preceded by: William North
- Succeeded by: Gouverneur Morris

Personal details
- Born: April 6, 1750 Woodbury, Connecticut, British America
- Died: May 15, 1806 (aged 56) New York City, New York, U.S.
- Party: Federalist
- Education: Yale College
- Profession: Soldier and Politician

James Watson (April 6, 1750 – May 15, 1806) was a United States Senator representing the state of New York.

== Life ==
Watson was born in Woodbury, Connecticut on April 6, 1750. He graduated from Yale College in 1776, and was commissioned a lieutenant in the Connecticut regiment. He retired as a captain in 1777 and studied law. Watson moved to New York City in 1786 and became a merchant at 44 Broad Street. He was a member of the New York State Assembly in 1791, 1794–1796 and was Speaker in 1794. He was a member of the New York State Senate (Southern District) from 1796 to 1798 and was a Regent of New York University from 1795 until his death.

In 1798, Watson was elected as a Federalist to the United States Senate to fill the vacancy caused by the resignation of John Sloss Hobart and served in the 5th and 6th United States Congress from December 11, 1798, to March 19, 1800, when he resigned to accept an appointment by President John Adams as Naval Officer of the Port of New York.

Watson was an unsuccessful candidate for Lieutenant Governor of New York in 1801. He was a member of the Society of the Cincinnati and an organizer and the first president of the New England Society of New York, from 1805 until his death.

Watson's townhouse, located at 7 State Street in New York City still stands and is on the National Register of Historic Places. It was also the residence of Elizabeth Ann Seton, the first American Catholic Saint. The home is currently occupied by the rectory of the Our Lady of the Holy Rosary Church and is part of the Seton Shrine.

== See also ==
- James Watson House

== Sources ==
- United States Congress. "James Watson (id: W000202)". Biographical Directory of the United States Congress.
- Political Graveyard

Political offices
Preceded by John Watts	Speaker of the New York State Assembly; 1794	Succeeded by William North
U.S. Senate
Preceded by William North	U.S. senator (Class 1) from New York; 1798–1800; Served alongside: John Laurance	Succeeded by Gouverneur Morris
