= John Sloss Hobart =

American judge (1738–1805)

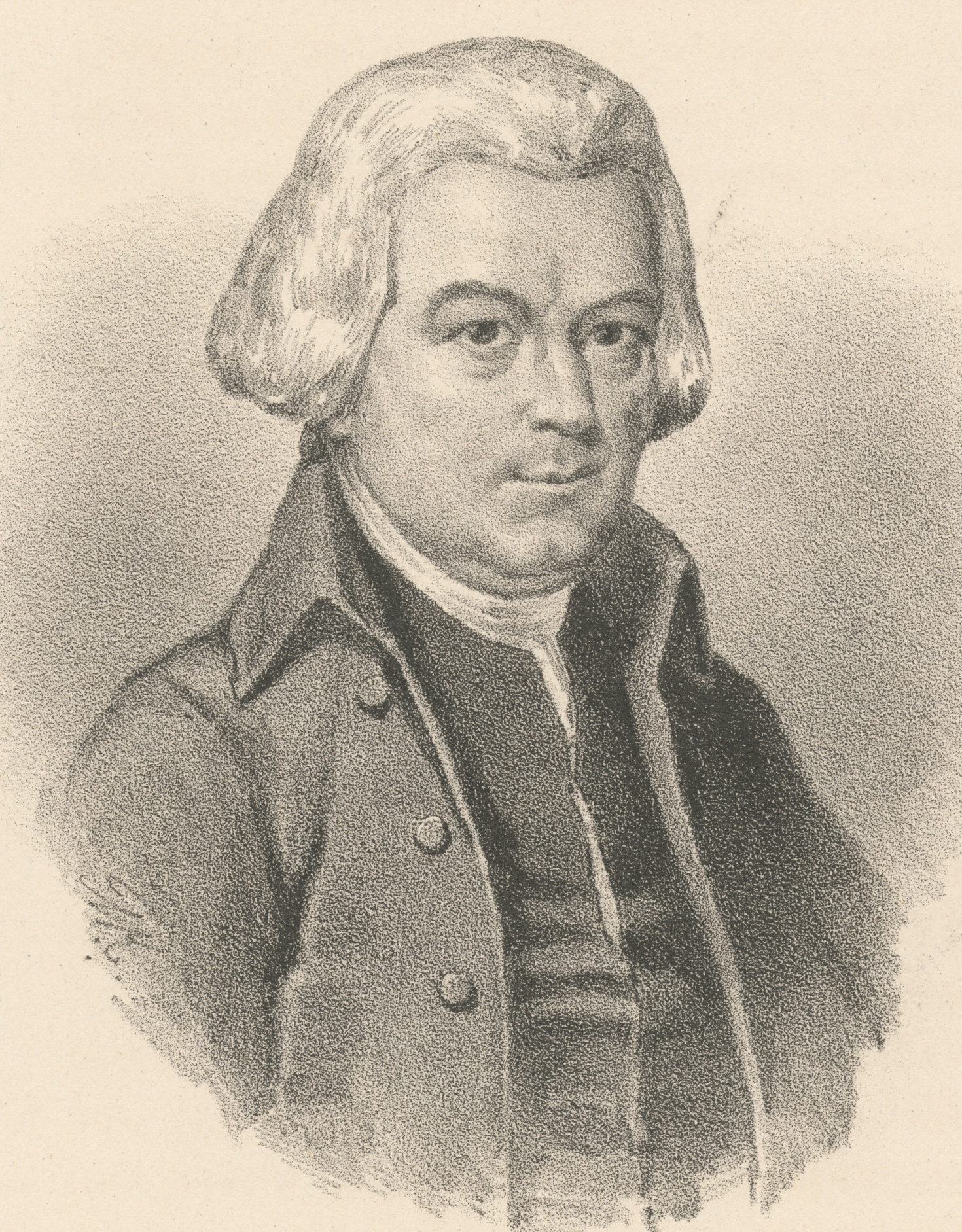
- Posthumous Lithograph, c. 1885

Judge of the United States District Court for the District of New York
- In office April 12, 1798 – February 4, 1805
- Appointed by: John Adams
- Preceded by: Robert Troup
- Succeeded by: Matthias B. Tallmadge

United States Senator from New York
- In office January 11, 1798 – April 16, 1798
- Preceded by: Philip Schuyler
- Succeeded by: William North

Personal details
- Born: John Sloss Hobart; May 6, 1738 Fairfield, Connecticut Colony, British America
- Died: February 4, 1805 (aged 66) New York City, New York
- Resting place: Trinity Church Cemetery; New York City, New York
- Party: Federalist
- Education: Yale University

John Sloss Hobart (May 6, 1738 – February 4, 1805) was a United States senator from New York and a United States district judge of the United States District Court for the District of New York.

== Education and career ==
Born on May 6, 1738, in Fairfield, Fairfield County, Connecticut Colony, British America, Hobart graduated from Yale University in 1757. He studied law, was admitted to the bar and commenced practice in New York. He was a member of the Committee of Correspondence in 1774. He was a deputy to the Provincial Convention in 1775. He was a deputy to the Provincial Congress of New York from 1775 to 1777. He was a member of the Council of Safety in 1777. He was an associate justice of the Supreme Court of Judicature of New York from 1777 to 1798. He was a member of the Hartford Convention of 1780. He was a member of the New York convention which ratified the United States Constitution in 1788.

== Congressional service ==
Hobart was elected to the United States Senate from New York as a Federalist in 1798 to fill the vacancy caused by the resignation of United States Senator Philip Schuyler and served from January 11 to April 16, 1798, when he resigned to accept a federal judicial post.

== Federal judicial service ==
Hobart was nominated by President John Adams on April 11, 1798, to a seat on the United States District Court for the District of New York vacated by Judge Robert Troup. He was confirmed by the United States Senate on April 12, 1798, and received his commission the same day. His service terminated on February 4, 1805, due to his death in New York City, New York. He was interred in Trinity Church Cemetery in New York City.

== Sources ==
- United States Congress. "John Sloss Hobart (id: H000661)". Biographical Directory of the United States Congress.
- John Sloss Hobart at the Biographical Directory of Federal Judges, a publication of the Federal Judicial Center.

U.S. Senate
Preceded by Philip Schuyler	U.S. senator (Class 1) from New York; 1798	Succeeded by William North
Legal offices
Preceded by Robert Troup	Judge of the United States District Court for the District of New York; 1798–1805	Succeeded by Matthias B. Tallmadge
