= Quakers in the abolition movement =

Quaker activism

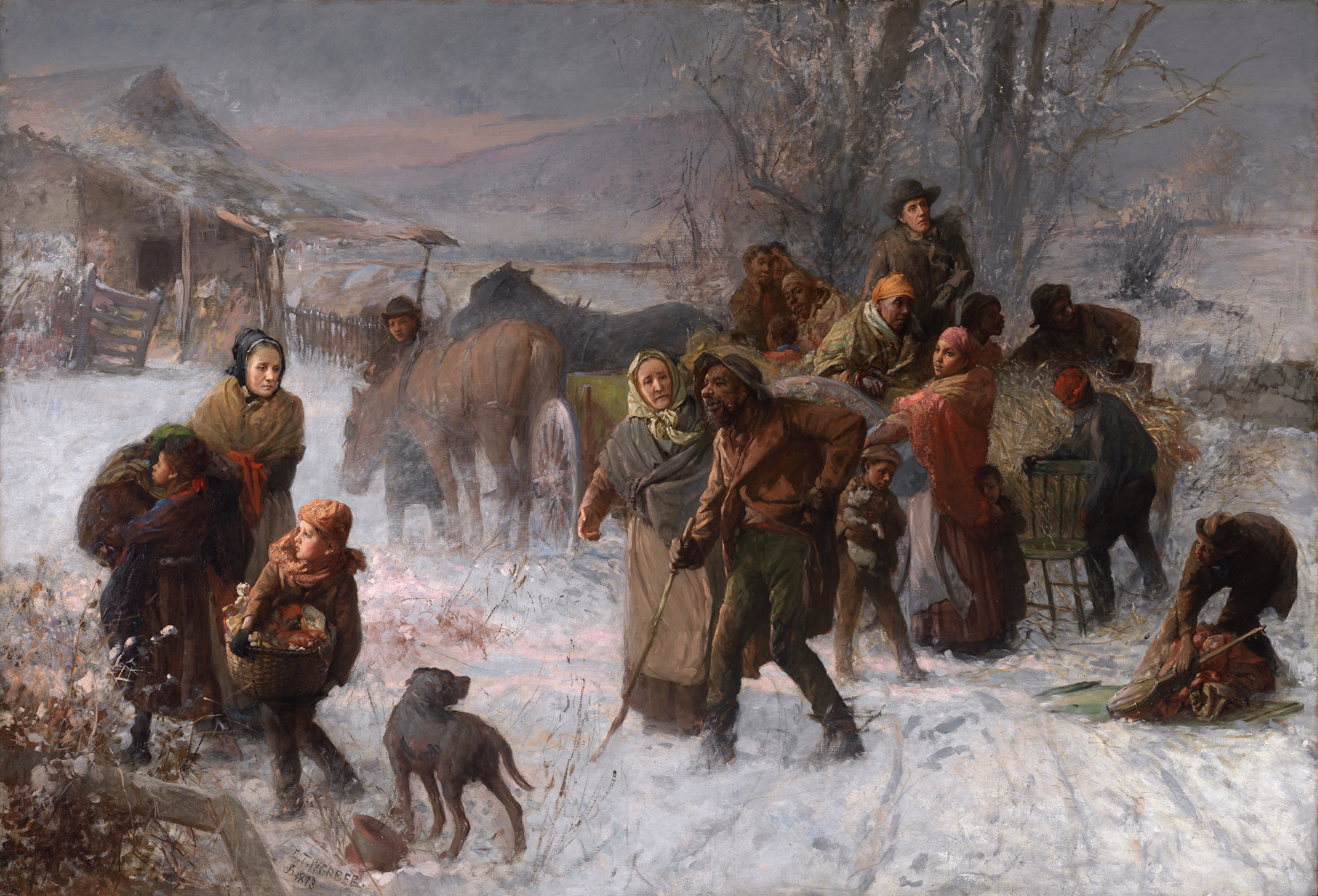
The Underground Railroad, 1893 depiction of the anti-slavery activities of a Northern Quaker named Levi Coffin by Charles T. Webber

The Religious Society of Friends, better known as the Quakers, played a major role in the abolition movement against slavery in both the United Kingdom and in the United States. Quakers were among the first groups to formally and consistently oppose slavery in the American colonies and Europe, and the Society of Friends became the first organization to take a collective stand against both slavery and the slave trade, later spearheading the international and ecumenical campaigns against slavery.

== Beginnings ==
When Quakers started to arrive in America, most of them believed that, "slavery was perfectly acceptable provided that slave owners attended to the spiritual and material needs of those they enslaved".

Quaker colonists began questioning slavery in Barbados in the 1670s. George Fox, founder of Quakerism, visited the island in 1671 and immediately appealed for better treatment of slaves. It was first openly denounced in 1688. In that year, four German settlers (the Lutheran Francis Daniel Pastorius and the three Quakers, the brothers Derick and Abraham op den Graeff and Garret Hendericks), issued a petition against slavery from Germantown, close to Philadelphia in the newly founded American colony of Pennsylvania. This action, although seemingly overlooked at the time, ushered in almost a century of active debate among Pennsylvanian Quakers about the morality of slavery which saw energetic anti-slavery writing and direct action from several Quakers, including William Southeby, John Hepburn, Ralph Sandiford, and Benjamin Lay.

In the 1740s and 1750s, anti-slavery sentiment took a firmer hold. A new generation of Quakers, including John Woolman, Anthony Benezet, and David Cooper, protested against slavery, and demanded that Quaker society cut ties with the slave trade. They were able to carry popular Quaker sentiment with them and, beginning in the 1750s, Pennsylvanian Quakers tightened their rules. By 1756 only 10% of leaders of the Philadelphia Yearly Meeting owned slaves. By 1758 Quakers effectively made it an act of misconduct to engage in slave trading. From 1755 to 1776, the Quakers worked at freeing slaves, and became the first Western organization to ban slaveholding. The London Yearly Meeting soon followed, issuing a ‘strong minute’ against slave trading in 1761. On paper at least, global politics would intervene. The American Revolution would divide Quakers across the Atlantic.

== United Kingdom ==
In the United Kingdom, Quakers would be foremost in the Society for Effecting the Abolition of the Slave Trade in 1787 which, with some setbacks, would be responsible for forcing the end of the British slave trade in 1807 and the end of slavery throughout the British Empire by 1838.

== United States ==
This brief 1815 biography of two early American abolitionists by Robert Vaux includes Quaker Benjamin Lay

As mentioned above, in 1688, Quakers in Germantown, Pennsylvania, signed a petition against slavery, "the first protest against African American slavery made by a religious body in the English colonies." The Pennsylvania Abolition Society, founded in 1775, consisted primarily of Quakers; seven of the ten original white members were Quakers, and 17 of the 24 who attended the four meetings held by the Society were Quakers, and by 1776, Quakers in the American colonies were prohibited by their yearly meetings from owning slaves. Two 18th-century Friends known for their opposition to slavery were John Woolman and Benjamin Lay.

In the nineteenth century, Quakers increasingly became associated with antislavery activism and antislavery literature. (See, for instance, Lucretia Mott, Arnold Buffum, the Grimké sisters, and Quaker poet John Greenleaf Whittier). Elias Hicks penned the Observations on the Slavery of the Africans and Their Descendants and on the Use of the Produce of their Labour in 1811, urging the boycott of the products of slave labor.

In many cases it was easier for Quakers to oppose the slave trade and slave ownership in the abstract than to directly oppose the institution of slavery in their local communities. Particularly in the South, Quakers were unpopular in general because of their anti-slavery stance and were often persecuted by slave owners. Eventually, entire communities of Quakers, such as those in Wrightsborough, Georgia, and Bush River, South Carolina, chose to leave their homes and move to the Northwest Territory where slavery was prohibited.

In North Carolina, when state laws prohibited slave owners from legally manumitting their slaves, non-Quakers who wished to free slaves often "sold" or "deeded" them to local Quaker meetings to de facto set them free. In the decades before the Civil War, Quaker meetings in North Carolina, supported by donations from Quaker meetings elsewhere, regularly organized and financed journeys to free states for groups of slaves who were accompanied by a Quaker agent carrying "ownership" credentials. On arriving in a free state, the Quaker agent manumitted the slaves and gave the now-free people of color their "freedom papers." Such an instance is referred to in the following excerpt from the March 3, 1842 Minutes of Deep River Monthly Meeting (North Carolina):

"David White, one of the Eastern agents, reported that 30 of the people of colour under the care of Friends have been removed to free governments since last yearly meeting, 23 of whom were sent to the State of Indiana and seven to Philadelphia and New Jersey, expense not fully known. George Swain, on behalf of the Emigration Committee reports that one person of colour has been removed by them to the State of Indiana this past year. Signed on behalf of the meeting aforesaid by Aaron Strather, Clerk this year."

As Quakers began to travel and spread (both geographically and theologically), different groups and individuals came to have varied ideas on slavery and how to act against it.

In spite of an earlier split (1828) among American Friends, both Hicksite and Orthodox Quakers were prominently involved with the Underground Railroad. For example, Orthodox Friend Levi Coffin started helping runaway slaves as a child in North Carolina. In 1826, Coffin and his wife Catherine moved to Randolph County, Indiana, where their home became known as "Grand Central Depot" on the Underground Railroad route north from the Ohio River, and Coffin became known as "the President of the Underground Railroad.". In 1847, the Coffins moved to Cincinnati where Levi opened a Free Labor store, and the couple continued their UGRR work. Many families in southwestern Ohio and eastern Indiana helped fugitives from slavery on their journeys to freedom via the Underground Railroad. One example is Henry Stubbs (born in Preble County, Ohio, to Quaker parents who immigrated from Wrightsborough, Georgia) who regularly drove a false-bottom wagon concealing fugitives from West Elkton, Ohio, to the Coffin's home in Randolph County, Indiana. Stubbs later moved to Indiana, where he and his family continued "conducting" fugitives further north. The Bundy family operated a station that transported groups of slaves from Belmont to Salem, Ohio. (For more examples from Ohio and Indiana, see Reminiscences by Levi Coffin above, and A Sense of the Meeting by Donne Hayden.)

One colorful slave trader, Zephaniah Kingsley, Jr., though born into a British Quaker family, had little use for Christianity in any form and, as an adult, would not have considered himself a Quaker, nor would he, as a slave owner, have been able to be a member of any Quaker meeting. Kingsley advocated, and personally practiced, the mixing of the black and the white races through marriage, which he claimed was hygienic, productive of healthy and beautiful children, and a step towards integration of blacks and whites. He also was strongly in favor of allowing free blacks, who, he claimed, strengthened a country. His four "wives", or concubines, were former slaves he had freed. These views were tolerated in Spanish Florida, where he was a planter, but after Florida became a U.S. territory in 1821, Kingsley found it necessary, for the future security of his complicated family, to leave Florida permanently for a plantation he purchased in the new country of former slaves, Haiti. He died in 1843 on board ship sailing from Haiti to New York.

There is no mention of Zephaniah Kingsley, Jr. in Hinshaw's extensive Encyclopedia of American Quaker Genealogy, 1607-1943 except his death, which is recorded in the Births and Deaths book for New York Monthly Meeting. The entry indicates he was a non-member, who was born in Scotland and died on Sept 13, 1843. Again, oddly, he was buried in the Quaker cemetery in Brooklyn with slightly different details on his headstone.

== See also ==
- Christian abolitionism
- List of abolitionist forerunners
