= 1783 New Jersey gubernatorial election =

- November 6, 1783
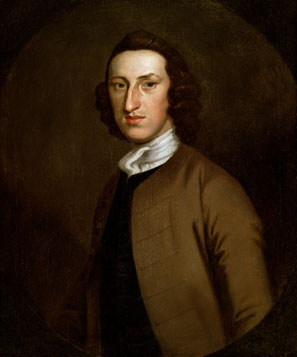
Nominee	William Livingston
Party	Nonpartisan
Popular vote	33
Percentage	97.06%
Governor before election
William Livingston
Nonpartisan
Elected Governor
William Livingston
Nonpartisan

The 1783 New Jersey gubernatorial election was held on November 6, 1783, in order to elect the Governor of New Jersey. Incumbent Governor William Livingston was re-elected by the New Jersey General Assembly against his opponent candidate John Cooper.

== General election ==
On election day, November 6, 1783, incumbent Governor William Livingston was re-elected by the New Jersey General Assembly by a margin of 32 votes against his opponent candidate John Cooper. Livingston was sworn in for his eighth term that same day.

=== Results ===
New Jersey gubernatorial election, 1783
Party	Candidate	Votes	%
Nonpartisan	William Livingston (incumbent)	33	97.06%
Nonpartisan	John Cooper	1	2.94%
Total votes		34	100.00%
Nonpartisan hold			
