= Sally Wister =

American writer (1761-1804)

- A silhouette of Sally Wister, her only known likeness
- Born: Sarah Wister; 20 July 1761; Philadelphia, Province of Pennsylvania, British America
- Died: 22 March 1804 (aged 42); Germantown, Pennsylvania, U.S.A.
- Resting place: Friends Arch Street Meeting House Burial Ground Philadelphia, Philadelphia County, Pennsylvania, USA
- Known for: Journal
- Relatives: John Wister, Caspar Wistar the elder, Caspar Wistar the younger

Sarah Wister (July 20, 1761 – March 21, 1870) was a young woman living in Pennsylvania during the American Revolution. She is principally known as the author of Sally Wister's Journal, written when she was sixteen; it is a firsthand account of life in the nearby countryside during the British occupation of Philadelphia in 1777 and 1778.

== Early life and education ==
Sarah (Sally) Wister was born July 20, 1761, in her paternal grandfather's house in Philadelphia. She was the first child of Daniel Wister and Lowery Jones (d. 1804) of Philadelphia. Her grandfather was John Wister, son of Hans Caspar Wüster (1671–1726) and younger brother of Caspar Wistar the elder, who had emigrated from Baden to join his brother in Philadelphia in 1727. John Wister adopted the Quaker faith and became a successful wine merchant and landowner; he built the house now known as Grumblethorpe in Germantown as a summer home in 1744. His second wife was Anna Catherine Rubenkam, of Wanfried, Germany. They had one son, Daniel (1738/9–1805).

Sally's mother, Lowery Jones, was the daughter of Susanna Evans and Owen Jones (Sr.), of Wynnewood, Lower Merion. Jones was the granddaughter of Gainor Owen and Jonathan Jones and the great-granddaughter of Mary Wynne (daughter of Dr. Thomas Wynne) and Dr. Edward Jones. Sally was their first child.

Little is known of Sally Wister's early life. She attended a girls' school run by the Quaker philanthropist Anthony Benezet.

Her writings show some knowledge of French and Latin, and she was clearly familiar with the literature of her time, particularly poetry, and especially Alexander Pope. It was at the Benezet school that young Sally met the future historian and memoirist Deborah Norris, whom she called Debby. She was also friends with Polly Fishbourne, Sally Jones, Anna Rawle, Peggy Rawle, and Sally Burge. The girls formed a "social circle" and exchanged numerous letters during the summers.

== American Revolutionary War ==
The Foulke house in 1902. The original portion, where the Wisters stayed, is the ivy-covered center.

Wister house in the present-day Germantown section of Philadelphia

In 1776, during the American Revolutionary War, the British Army occupied New York and much of New Jersey.

In 1777, the British Army moved to take Philadelphia, the capital and principal city of the Thirteen Colonies. With the fall of Philadelphia seen as imminent, many Philadelphians fled the city, and Wister's family of seven moved to North Wales, Pennsylvania, home of Hannah Foulke, a widow whose son had married a sister of Lowery Wister and whom Sally knew as "Aunt Hanna[h]" The main house is located a few hundred meters east of Wissahickon Creek, where the Penllyn station has been built; at the time, the Foulkes' mill was nearby. The Wisters probably arrived about late 1776; they were certainly there by early 1777. Sally kept up correspondence with at least Debby Norris and a few others.

=== Sally Wister's Journal ===
Two weeks after the Battle of Brandywine, on September 25, 1777, with the fall of Philadelphia and disruption of mail, Sally Wister, then aged sixteen, began keeping "a sort of journal of the time that may expire", which took the form of letters to Debby Norris, as letters would no longer reach her. She hoped that the letters would give her friend "pleasure" "some time hence" (As it turned out, Norris did not see the letters written to her for many years, after Sally Wister had died.)

The letters, written in Quaker-style, use numbers for the days of the week (Sunday is "First Day", etc.), and show the thoughts, hopes, and fears of a sixteen-year-old in wartime. She sometimes wears womanly clothes, awkwardly preferring "the girlish dress"; other times, she revels in her budding womanhood. The journal covers nine months, a span of time that included the capture of Philadelphia, the surrender of Burgoyne at Saratoga, the encampment at Valley Forge, the Conway Cabal, and the eventual British evacuation of Philadelphia. The battles of Germantown, Whitemarsh, and Barren Hill were fought relatively close to North Wales, but the Wisters remained safe, although there were moments of trepidation. Sally hears gunfire on December 7, and her next journal entry begins, "Rejoice with us, my dear. The British have return'd to the city. Charming news this."

While they avoided battles, the inhabitants of the Foulke farm saw many troop movements, and a substantial number of Continental Army officers were billeted in the house, or visited those who were. Visitors included General William Smallwood, commander of the Maryland troops, who made the house his headquarters, Colonel James Wood of Virginia, and Major Aaron Ogden of New Jersey. All three of these later became governors of their respective home states.

Sally and some of the other girls enjoy flirtations with some of the younger officers and, in league with some, play a trick on another. She appears to be falling in love with Major William Truman Stoddert, "about nineteen" and a nephew of Gen. Smallwood. After a few weeks, the soldiers receive orders to march; Sally is "very sorry" and Stoddert "looks dull". Stoddert returns a month later, ill with a cold and fever; he is nursed back to health and leaves again, but soon returns, "not relishing the idea of sleeping on the banks of the Schuylkill". However, he does not stay long, and when he leaves, Sally observes "we shall not, I fancy, see him again for months, perhaps years". Any romance between them would have been problematic: "A wide gulf of social and religious prejudice lay between them", as he was an Anglican, a soldier, and a member of a slaveowning family, while she was a pacifist Quaker, a member of a sect that forbade its members from marrying out of the faith or owning slaves.

In between these periods of excitement were stretches of boredom. On December 20, Sally observed, "I shall hang up my pen till something offers worth relating." Her next entry was not until February. Winter passes uneventfully. As it draws to a close, Sally and a friend go to look over the remains of the nearby army camp, which she describes as "ragged" and "ruinous". She skips from March to May, both for "scarcity of paper" and "hardly anything" of news. With the advancing season come rumors of an imminent evacuation of Philadelphia (and unwanted attention from another officer). On June 19 comes word that the occupying army has left; the Continentals depart in pursuit, and Sally, "think[ing] of nothing but returning to Philadelphia", concludes her journal.

The Wister family returned home to Philadelphia in July 1778, Upon the death of Sally's grandfather, John Wister, in 1789, her father took up residence in the family summer house in Germantown. and Sally Wister lived there the rest of her life.

Although a number of the soldiers noted in the journal did not survive the Revolutionary War, Stoddert did, although "much indispos'd" as of 1780. He returned to Maryland, married a woman named Sally, and died "from the lingering effects of the hardships of camp life" in 1793.

The letters constituting the journal, 48 pages in all, remained at the Wister house until about 1830, years after their author's death. At that time, her brother Charles Wister loaned them to Debby Norris, who was by then Mrs. George Logan of Stenton. The journal as a whole was not widely published until 1902, although excerpts were published earlier or in restricted circulation. The book received favorable reviews, with The New York Times praising the "exhaustive biographical notes" published with it. According to The Athenaeum:

There is a charmingly light touch about the journal which makes us regret that Sally never took to novel-writing; she might have been an American Miss Burney.

== Death ==
Sally Wister died in Germantown, Pennsylvania, on March 21, 1804. She was more withdrawn in later life and "much occupied with religious matters". As far as is known, she never saw Major Stoddert again, and she died unmarried.

Benjamin Rush noted her death in The Philadelphia Gazette on April 25, 1804, lauding her "prudence, virtue, piety, and eminent acquirements".
