= 1806 United States Senate election in Pennsylvania =

Election of Andrew Gregg as U.S. Senator from Pennsylvania

- December 9–16, 1806
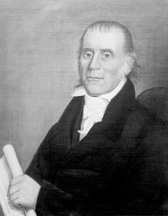

	Majority party	Minority party	Third party
Candidate	Andrew Gregg	Nathaniel Boileau	Isaac Weaver Jr.
Party	Democratic-Republican	Democratic-Republican	Democratic-Republican
Popular vote	68	34	6
Percentage	60.71%	30.36%	5.36%
U.S. senator before election
George Logan (Pennsylvania politician)
Democratic-Republican
Elected U.S. Senator
Andrew Gregg
Democratic-Republican

The 1806 United States Senate election in Pennsylvania was held from December 9 to 16, 1806, to elect a U.S. Senator to represent Pennsylvania in the Class 3 seat. Andrew Gregg, a Democratic-Republican, was elected by the Pennsylvania General Assembly, defeating fellow Democratic-Republicans Nathaniel Boileau and Isaac Weaver Jr. Incumbent Senator George Logan, also a Democratic-Republican, who was elected in a special election in 1801, did not seek re-election.

== Background ==
Prior to the ratification of the Seventeenth Amendment in 1913, U.S. Senators were elected by state legislatures rather than by popular vote. In Pennsylvania, the Pennsylvania General Assembly, comprising the House of Representatives and the Senate, convened to elect senators. The 1806 election was for the Class 3 seat, with the term beginning on March 4, 1807, and ending on March 3, 1813.

== Election process ==
The Pennsylvania General Assembly convened on December 9, 1806, in Lancaster, Pennsylvania, the state capital at the time, to elect a U.S. Senator for the term beginning March 4, 1807. The election required a majority of votes from the combined houses, as per federal law governing Senate elections. Four ballots were conducted over several days.

The candidates were:

- Andrew Gregg, a former U.S. Representative (1791–1807) and a prominent Democratic-Republican.
- Nathaniel Boileau, a lesser-known Democratic-Republican with support from certain factions.
- Isaac Weaver Jr., another Democratic-Republican candidate with limited backing.

After three inconclusive ballots, the fourth and final ballot on December 16, 1806, resulted in a clear majority for Gregg.

== Results ==
The results of the fourth and final ballot, combining votes from both houses of the Pennsylvania General Assembly, are as follows:

Candidate	Party	Votes	Percentage
Andrew Gregg	Democratic-Republican	68	60.71%
Nathaniel Boileau	Democratic-Republican	34	30.36%
Isaac Weaver Jr.	Democratic-Republican	6	5.36%
Others	—	4	3.57%
Total		112	100.00%

== Aftermath ==
Andrew Gregg was elected to the U.S. Senate and served from March 4, 1807, to March 3, 1813. His tenure was marked by his support for Jeffersonian policies, including trade restrictions and preparations for the War of 1812. Notably, Gregg was elected President pro tempore of the United States Senate in 1809, serving briefly during the 11th United States Congress.

== See also ==
- 1806–07 United States Senate elections
- List of United States senators from Pennsylvania
- Pennsylvania General Assembly
