= 1801 United States Senate special election in Pennsylvania =

1801 U.S. Senate special election in Pennsylvania
- December 17, 1801

111 Members of the Pennsylvania legislature Majority of votes needed to win
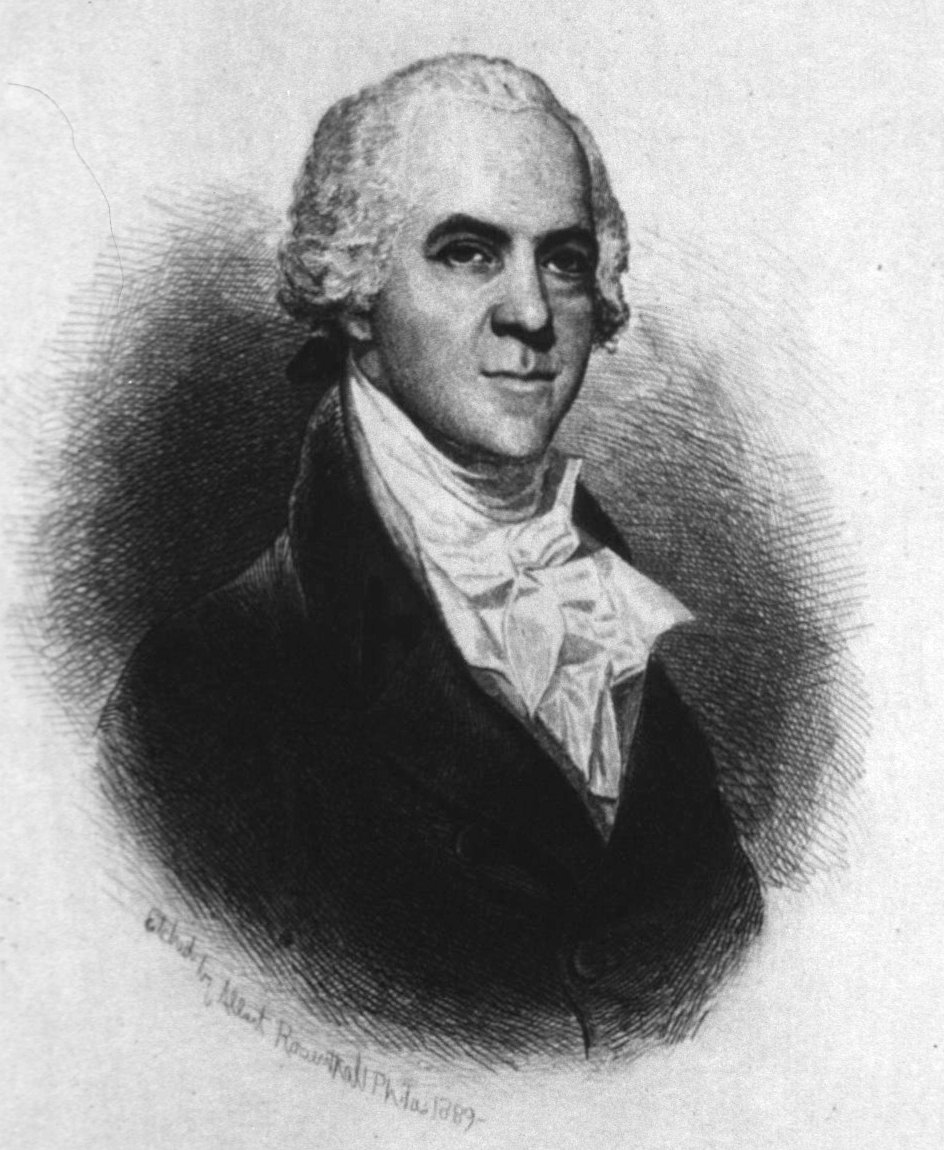

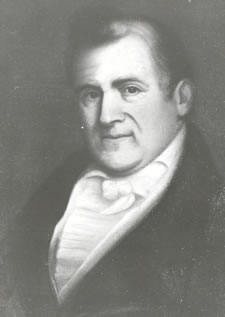
Nominee	George Logan	Joseph Hiester
Party	Democratic-Republican	Democratic-Republican
Electoral vote	68	30
Percentage	61.26%	27.03%
Senator before election
Peter Muhlenberg
Democratic-Republican
Elected Senator
George Logan
Democratic-Republican

The 1801 United States Senate special election in Pennsylvania was held on December 17, 1801. George Logan was elected by the Pennsylvania General Assembly to the United States Senate.

== Background ==
The Democratic-Republican Peter Muhlenberg was elected to the United States Senate by the Pennsylvania General Assembly, consisting of the House of Representatives and the Senate, in February 1801. Sen. Muhlenberg resigned on June 30, 1801, after being appointed supervisor of revenue for Pennsylvania by President Thomas Jefferson.

== Results ==
Following the resignation of Sen. Peter Muhlenberg, the Pennsylvania General Assembly convened on December 17, 1801, to elect a new senator to fill the vacancy. The results of the vote of both houses combined are as follows:

State legislature results
Party	Candidate	Votes	%
Democratic-Republican	George Logan	68	61.26
Democratic-Republican	Joseph Hiester	30	27.03
Democratic-Republican	Isaac Weaver	4	3.60
Democratic-Republican	Samuel Maclay	2	1.80
Democratic-Republican	Nathaniel Boileau	2	1.80
Unknown	John Kean	1	0.90
N/A	Not voting	4	3.60
Totals		111	100.00%

Preceded by Feb. 1801	Pennsylvania U.S. Senate election (Class III); 1801	Succeeded by 1806
