= Underground Railroad (disambiguation) =

The Underground Railroad was a network of escape routes for slaves in the 19th century United States.

Underground Railroad may also refer to:

== Arts and entertainment ==
- Underground Railroad (album), by Joe McPhee, 1969
- Underground Railroad (band), a French post-punk band based in London
- The Underground Railroad (Still), an 1872 book by William Still
- The Underground Railroad (novel), a 2016 novel by Colson Whitehead
  - The Underground Railroad (miniseries), 2021, based on the novel
- The Underground Railroad (painting), by Charles T. Webber, 1893
- Underground Railroad (Psi World), a 1985 adventure for the role-playing game Psi World

== Other uses ==
- Rapid transit, high-capacity public transport in urban areas
- Underground railway (disambiguation)
- Operation Underground Railroad, a nonprofit United States–based anti–sex trafficking organization

== See also ==
- Race to Freedom: The Underground Railroad, 1994 Canadian TV film featuring Tyrone Benskin
