= 1801 United States Senate election in Pennsylvania =

1801 U.S. Senate election in Pennsylvania
- February 19, 1801

102 Members of the Pennsylvania legislature Plurality of votes needed to win
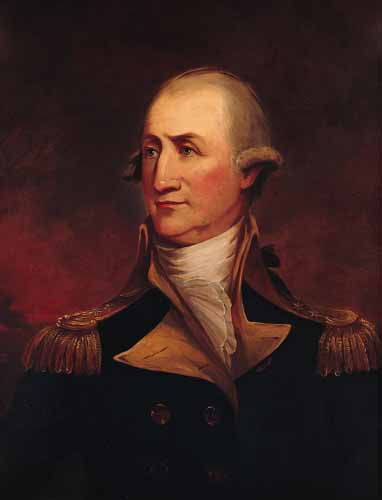

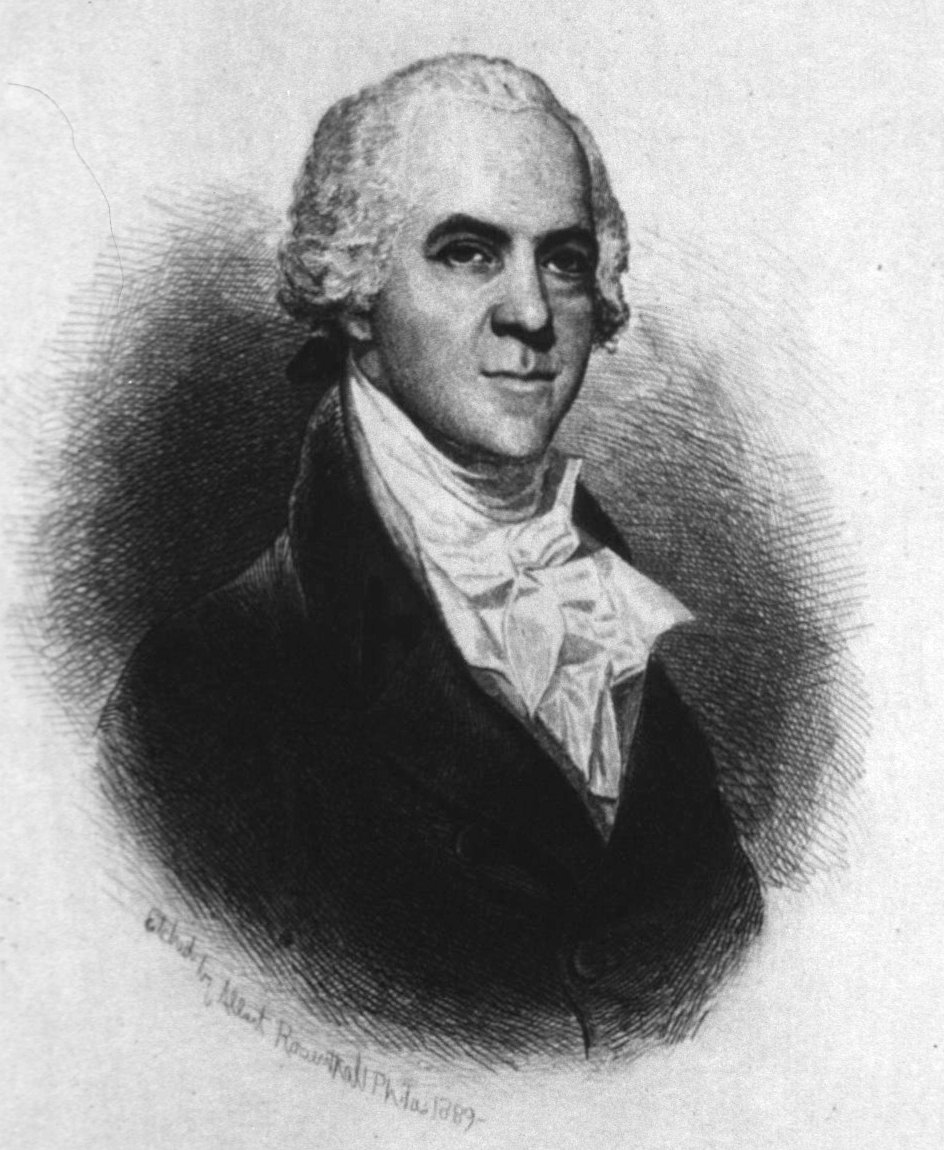
Nominee	Peter Muhlenberg	George Logan
Party	Democratic-Republican	Democratic-Republican
Electoral vote	46	45
Percentage	45.10%	44.12%
Senator before election
William Bingham
Federalist
Elected Senator
Peter Muhlenberg
Democratic-Republican

The 1801 United States Senate election in Pennsylvania was held on February 19, 1801. Peter Muhlenberg was elected by the Pennsylvania General Assembly to the United States Senate.

== Results ==
Incumbent Federalist William Bingham, who was elected in 1795, was not a candidate for re-election to another term. The Pennsylvania General Assembly, consisting of the House of Representatives and the Senate, convened on February 19, 1801, to elect a new senator to fill the term beginning on March 4, 1801. Two ballots were recorded. The results of the second and final ballot of both houses combined are as follows:

State legislature results
Party	Candidate	Votes	%
Democratic-Republican	Peter Muhlenberg	46	45.10
Democratic-Republican	George Logan	45	44.12
	Not voting	11	10.78
Total votes		102	100

Preceded by 1795	Pennsylvania U.S. Senate election (Class III); 1801	Succeeded by Dec. 1801
