= David Cooper (abolitionist) =

American politician

- Born: February 20, 1725; Woodbury, New Jersey, U.S.
- Died: April 1, 1795 (aged 70); Woodbury, New Jersey, U.S.
- Resting place: Quaker Cemetery, New Jersey
- Occupations: Farmer, politician, abolitionist
- Spouse: Sybil Matlack Cooper
- Children: Amos Cooper and Martha Allinson
- Relatives: John Cooper (brother) Ann Cooper Whitall(sister)

Signature
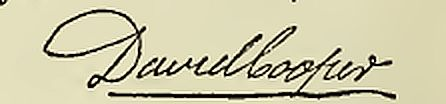

David Cooper (February 20, 1725 – April 1, 1795) was an American farmer, Quaker, pamphleteer and an author of abolitionist ideals in the latter 1700s. A native of New Jersey, he lived the greater part of his life in and around Gloucester and Salem, New Jersey. Cooper was vocal on the issue of slavery and was devoted to the abolitionist movement before, during and after the American Revolution. A devout Quaker, he made numerous comparisons between abolition and Biblical thought in his writings and orations. By submitting pamphlets and petitions, Cooper appealed to and encouraged George Washington and the Congress to make efforts to abolish slavery. He is noted for writing a 22-page anti-slavery tract addressed to the "Rulers of America", which was distributed to members of Congress, a copy of which Washington signed and kept in his personal library.

== Personal life ==
David Cooper was born in Woodbury, New Jersey located along the Delaware River, close to Philadelphia, on February 20, 1725. His father was John Cooper; his mother, Ann Clarke. David married Sybil Matlack Cooper. They had at least two children who survived their childhood: Amos Cooper and Martha Allinson. David's father, John, received a sizable inheritance from his grandfather. John Senior died in 1730, when David was six. Subsequently, David and his siblings were raised by their mother who was a devoted Quaker. The community he was raised in was also largely devoted to the Quaker ethic. David's maternal grandfather, Benjamin Clarke, was among the first Quaker abolitionists in colonial America. David in turn received an inheritance from his late father, which included a plot of land; he used his inheritance to launch a successful business, for which he felt he was blessed.

David's older brother, John, died in 1728 at the age of ten. A year later David's parents gave birth to another son whom they also named John, who lived to adulthood. i.e. John Cooper, David's younger brother, (Note: This was an age when infant and child mortality was common, where the tradition was, that if a child died, its name would be passed on to the next born of the same gender.) became a notable figure during the American Revolution, and was the author of the New Jersey Constitution of 1776. He was also elected to the Second Continental Congress in 1776, but it is unclear whether he attended or not.

On October 22, 1777, the Coopers fled from their homes in Woodbury during the failed Hessian assault on Fort Mercer during the Battle of Red Bank. After the British gained control over the area, British General Charles Cornwallis used the home of David's brother John as his temporary headquarters.

In his memoirs, Cooper documents his early life, family history, marriage, the birth of his children, his involvements with the Quakers, and the various struggles he faced with his faith. He also recounts his work as a New Jersey representative in 1761, along with an account of his participation at Quaker Meetings. He wrote the manuscript during his final years, for his children, when his health was failing, so that they would have a personal record of his life and work after he had died. David Cooper died in 1795, at age 70, in Gloucester County, New Jersey.

== Quaker and abolitionist ==
Brought up in a household that condemned slavery, David came to regard slavery as an institution contrary to natural law. His sense of the injustice of slavery, which largely arose from the injustices and inhumanity involved with the Atlantic slave trade, became evident in his 1772 correspondence with Granville Sharp, a leading and outspoken English abolitionist. As a dedicated Quaker and a staunch abolitionist Cooper petitioned Congress three times in his effort to advance abolition legislature and abolish slavery, lobbied President George Washington, and wrote about these prospects at length in his diary and other writings. He also criticized the American Patriot's use of violence during the American Revolutionary War as Quakers were pacifists and were opposed to violence.

For eight years, beginning in 1761, Cooper served in the State of New Jersey as an elected member of the New Jersey House of Assembly.

In 1772 he wrote and published Mite cast into the treasury: or, Observations on slave-keeping, which was coauthored by Anthony Benezet another leading abolitionist. As a Christian and Quaker, Cooper made numerous references and parallels to Biblical thought throughout his book. In the introduction Cooper definitively summarized his position regarding prejudice and slavery:

"The power of prejudice over the minds of mankind is very extraordinary; hardly any extremes too distant, or absurdities too glaring for it to unite or reconcile, if it tends to promote or justify a favorite pursuit. It is thus we are to account for the fallacious reasonings and absurd sentiments used and entertained concerning negroes, and the lawfulness of keeping them slaves"

In 1785 Cooper, along with other Quakers, like Samuel Allinson, submitted petitions to the Legislature for purposes of enacting emancipation legislation. The bills failed but the Legislature instead passed a law the next year that helped expedite manumissions, which stipulated that slave owners provide education for their slaves. The law also added penalties for any abuses to slaves, while also outlawing the slave trade.

=== Address to Rulers of America ===
In 1783 Cooper wrote a 22-page declaration condemning slavery, which was published in a leading Quaker abolitionist tract, addressed to the U.S. government; the Address was entitled A Serious Address to the Rulers of America, on the Inconsistency of Their Conduct Respecting Slavery. (Note: The Full title is: A Serious Address to the Rulers of America, on the Inconsistency of their Conduct respecting Slavery: Forming a Contrast Between the Encroachments of England on American Liberty and American Injustice in Tolerating Slavery) The pamphlet was a treatise written in strong and unforgiving terms, accusing American slaveholders of "treason" against the natural rights of man, and of making a "mockery" of the Declaration of Independence. Throughout his Serious Address Cooper appealed to Americans' "regard for the honour of America", regarding equality and liberty against perceived British tyranny, as contradictory with the practice of American slavery. The Serious Address contained numerous references and parallels to the revolutionary ideals expressed in the Declaration of Independence of 1776, Congressional Declaration of the Causes and Necessities of Taking Up Arms, of 1775; Congressional Declaration of Rights and Grievances of 1774 and other such declarations from the various states. (Note: which also included the Declaration of the Rights of Pennsylvania, of 1776, and the Declaration of the Rights of Massachusetts of 1779.) Alongside of his arguments Cooper made references to quotations taken from these documents.

Cooper published the tract with the intention that it be read aloud in the various colonies at a time when the Quakers were not in the best favor due to their non-violent and passive involvement in the American Revolution. As a result, Cooper decided to publish his tract anonymously, concealing its Quaker origins. One year before his death, Anthony Benezet presented copies to George Washington and members of Congress along with a copy to each member of the New Jersey Assembly.

Cooper's tract asserted that the Golden Rule was a natural law from Christ that outlawed slavery. In one passage, Cooper addressed his remarks, in religious tones, to America's critics over the gap between liberty and slavery, that the new nation was making strides to end slavery on the basis of natural freedom endowed by the creator.

Washington would later sign his name to a copy and keep it in his private library. Thomas Jefferson also received a copy, which is now in possession of the Library of Congress.

"Now is the time to demonstrate to Europe, to the whole world, that America was in earnest, and meant what she said, when, with peculiar energy, and unanswerable reasoning, she pled the cause of human nature, and with undaunted firmness insisted, that all mankind came from the hand of their Creator equally free. Let not the world have an opportunity to charge her conduct with a contradiction to her solemn and often repeated declarations; or to say that her sons are not real friends to freedom". (Note: Passage is found on page four in the original printing.)

Benezet, who helped Cooper with his Serious Address, admired Cooper's work and sent a copy to John Pemberton, a good friend and publisher in London, on September 10, 1783. In a postscript Benezet had written, "I also enclose a piece lately published on slavery & c. viz. A Serious Address." Cooper had written his Address anonymously, signing it A Farmer, to protect the Society of Friends from any responsibility of its controversial message, and was displeased with Benezet that he had published his authorship and revealed his real identity. Writing Cooper, Benezet asked if one of his pamphlets could be "stiched together" with Cooper's and published. His request was not well received by Cooper. In a letter of June 15, 1783, to Samuel Allinson, Cooper expressed his concerns about anonymity, protesting that Benezet "...knows how careful I was of having the author suspected. ... I regret he saw it", concluding, "I might near as well have put my name to it". He sent one to each member of Congress, and to our own Assembly at Burlington, and is about writing to our Governor." Benezet had also given a copy to George Washington. Cooper and some of his Quaker contemporaries continued with their efforts to bring about abolition. Writing in 1779, Cooper advocated the boycott of any goods produced by slave labor.

=== Concept of emancipation and abolition ===
Cooper's concept of emancipation and abolition is delineated in his writings, and in other pamphlets published by Quakers during the latter half of the eighteenth century, with the idea of gradual emancipation being the central idea. Cooper disagreed with lifelong bondage and felt that masters should give their slaves a home and education and that slaves should be granted their freedom at a given age, in accordance with natural law. His ideas of abolition closely paralleled those surrounding indentured servitude in the American colonies where servants were required to serve for a given length of time, usually about seven years, and would be under the authority and discretion of their master. Like many slaves, they could not marry, own property, or leave the master's property without his permission. Cooper likened the institution of indentured servitude with his ideas of gradual emancipation. Cooper and many of his Quaker contemporaries established the amount of time for slaves to serve would be until they reached a "proper age". Cooper's ideas first became public in 1772 when he published his A Mite cast into the Treasury...', where he asserted that, "every individual of the human species by the law of nature comes into the world equally entitled to freedom at a proper age." Sometime later he fixed this age to be eighteen for women, and twenty-one for men. Also, when Cooper made reference to female slaves, he explained "...till she came to the age of a woman, at which time she was pronounced free by the law of nature, and precepts of Christ." Therefore, he believed that all of humanity was a dependent under the rule of an authority before growing into maturity. In his Mite cast Cooper also criticizes the slave trade, asserting that slaves were treated like "brute animals" with no regard for the idea that they, also, were creatures of God.

== See also ==
- Anthony Benezet, Benjamin Rush and Warner Mifflin – prominent abolitionists in Cooper's day
- Quakers in the abolition movement
- Pennsylvania Abolition Society
- List of abolitionist forerunners

== Bibliography ==
- Brookes, George S. (1937). Friend Anthony Benezet. University of Pennsylvania Press. ISBN 9781512810660.
- Cadbury, Henry J. (1937). "QUAKER BIBLIOGRAPHICAL NOTES: II. Antislavery Writings". Bulletin of Friends Historical Association. 26 (1): 39–53. doi:10.1353/qkh.1937.a425559. JSTOR 41944034.
- Cooper, David; Anthony, Benezet (1772). A mite cast into the treasury: or, Observations on slave-keeping. Princeton University.
- Cooper, David (1983) [1783]. A Serious Address to the Rulers of America, on the Inconsistency of Their Conduct Respecting Slavery: Forming a Contrast Between the Encroachments of England on American Liberty, and American Injustice in Tolerating Slavery.
- Davis, David Brion (1999). The Problem of Slavery in the Age of Revolution, 1770-1823. Oxford University Press. ISBN 978-0-1980-2949-6.
- Flynn, Kara, ed. (2015). David Cooper memoir (PDF). Haverford College Quaker & Special Collections. ISBN 978-1-3172-7279-3.
- Furstenberg, François (2011). "Atlantic Slavery, Atlantic Freedom: George Washington, Slavery, and Transatlantic Abolitionist Networks". The William and Mary Quarterly. 68 (2). Omohundro Institute of Early American History and Culture: 247–286. doi:10.5309/willmaryquar.68.2.0247. JSTOR 10.5309/willmaryquar.68.2.0247.
- Hayes, Kevin J. (2017). George Washington: A Life in Books. ISBN 978-0-1904-5668-9.
- Kershner, Jon R. (2018). To Renew the Covenant": Religious Themes in Eighteenth Century Quaker Abolitionism. BRILL. ISBN 978-9-0043-8883-3.
- Jackson, Maurice (2010). Let this Voice be Heard: Anthony Benezet, Father of Atlantic Abolitionism. University of Pennsylvania Press. ISBN 978-0-8122-2126-8.
- Jackson, Maurice; Kozel, Susan (2016). Quakers and Their Allies in the Abolitionist Cause, 1754-1808. Routeledge Publishers. ISBN 978-1-3172-7279-3.
- Lewis, Enoch; Rhoads, Samuel (1862). Friends' review; a religious, literary and miscellaneous journal, Vol. XV. Philadelphia, J. Tatum.
- ——; Rhoads, Samuel (1863). Friends' review; a religious, literary and miscellaneous journal, Vol. XVI. Philadelphia, J. Tatum.
- Morgan, Kenneth (2000). "George Washington and the Problem of Slavery". Journal of American Studies. 34 (2): 279–301. doi:10.1017/S0021875899006398. JSTOR 27556810. S2CID 145717616.
- Nash, Gary B. (1990). Race and Revolution. Rowman & Littlefield. ISBN 978-0-9456-1221-6.
- Eric Saul, ed. (2018). "American Abolitionists and Antislavery Activists".
- Sinha, Manisha (2016). The Slave's Cause: A History of Abolition. Yale University Press. ISBN 9780300181371.
- Smith, Bill L. (2014). "Journal: Never Take Kinship Personally: Confronting Slavery, Masculinity, and Family in Revolutionary America". Quaker History. 103 (1): 17–35. doi:10.1353/qkh.2014.0005. JSTOR 24896081. S2CID 145788205.
- Cooper, David (1772). A mite cast into the treasury: or, Observations on slave-keeping. Evans Early American - Text Creation Partnership.
- "Biographical Directory of the United States Congress". Archived from the original on March 4, 2016.

=== Further reading ===
- Brown, Christopher Leslie (2012). Moral Capital: Foundations of British Abolitionism. UNC Press Books. ISBN 978-0-8078-3895-2.
- Carey, Brycchan; Plank, Geoffrey (2014). Quakers and Abolition. University of Illinois Press. ISBN 978-0-2520-9612-9.
- Cooper, David (1772). A Mite Cast Into the Treasury: Or, Observations on Slave-keeping. J. Crukshank.
- DeBusk, Krristin (2004). An Ordinary Man in Extraordinary Times: David Cooper's Fight against Slavery (PDF). University of Texas.
- John P. Kaminski, 1995, A Necessary Evil?: Slavery and the Debate Over the Constitution, p. 26
