= Deborah Norris Logan =

American historian and memoirist (1761–1839)

- 1830 portrait of Logan
- Born: Deborah Norris; October 19, 1761; Philadelphia, Province of Pennsylvania, British America
- Died: February 2, 1839 (aged 77); Philadelphia, Pennsylvania, U.S.
- Occupations: Historian, memoirist
- Spouse: George Logan (m. 1781; died 1821)
- Children: 3 sons
- Relatives: Isaac Norris (grandfather)

Deborah Norris Logan (October 19, 1761 — February 2, 1839) was an American Quaker historian and memoirist, and wife of politician George Logan.

== Early life and education ==
Deborah (Debby) Norris was born on October 19, 1761, to Charles Norris, a Quaker merchant of Philadelphia, and Mary (Parker) Norris. She was their second child and the oldest daughter in the family. As a granddaughter of Isaac Norris, she was a member of one of Philadelphia's most prominent and influential families. Her father died when she was only five years old. Although she attended Philadelphia's Friends Girls School—the first public girls' school on the American continent, founded by the philanthropist and educator Anthony Benezet—she was largely self-educated, devising for herself an intensive course of reading after she left the school. At the Friends Girls School, she met and became friends with the future diarist Sally Wister. When they were separated by families dispersing as a result of the British occupation of Philadelphia of 1777–78, Wister began keeping a diary in the form of unsent letters to "Debby" Norris. Wister died in 1804, and sometime around 1830 her brother loaned the letters to Norris. Wister's epistolary diary was later published as Sally Wister's Journal.

The Norris family lived near Independence Hall (home of the colonial legislature), and in later life Deborah recalled standing in her yard behind a fence and listening to the first-ever reading of the Declaration of Independence in July 1776. Just 14 at the time, she took note of the fact that the crowd was a small one and that (in the sardonic phrasing of her mature self): "those among them who joined in the acclamation were not the most sober or reflecting."

On September 6, 1781, she married the physician George Logan (1753–1821), grandson of William Penn's secretary James Logan. Two years later they moved into Stenton, a mansion built in the Germantown area of Philadelphia by James Logan that is now open to the public. They had three sons, Albanus (1783–1854), Gustavus George (1786–1800), and Algernon Sydney (1791–1835). George gave up medicine and became a gentleman farmer and politician. At Stenton, the couple entertained a wide circle of politicians, artists, writers, and businesspeople. Deborah served as hostess for these gatherings but also developed a separate career as a writer and historian. Robert Walsh, editor of the National Gazette, admired in Logan "a strength of intellect, a copiousness of knowledge, an habitual dignity of thought and manner, and a natural justness and refinement."

In 1816, Charles Willson Peale painted her portrait, which still hangs at Stenton.

== Writing and later life ==
In the attics at Stenton, Deborah found a neglected collection of old letters between William Penn and James Logan. Recognizing the letters' potential historical significance, she started transcribing and annotating the Penn-Logan correspondence in 1814. In order to avoid conflicts with her household duties, she would rise at dawn to work on the letters. The fruits of this labor ran to 11 manuscript volumes. Logan was ambivalent about publishing any of it, fearing criticism more than she desired immediate recognition. Yet eventually she gave in and allowed the first volume to be published, after which she began to be sought out as a reader or editor for other publications. The complete correspondence was eventually published by the Historical Society of Pennsylvania in two volumes in 1870–72. Long before this, however, her efforts were recognized by the society when, in 1827, Deborah became the first woman elected to its membership. Only the year before, Logan had written in a letter to her friend Sarah Walker that the society would not accept her because "they do not want women." Her own memoir and some of the letters she had transcribed were published in 1830 in John F. Watson’s Annals of Philadelphia, now considered the first major history of that city.

Starting in 1815 and continuing to just before her death, Logan began keeping a diary in which she intended to record "whatever I shall hear of fact or anecdote that shall appear worthy of preservation." The diary is over 4000 pages long, and in it can be found accounts of domestic life at Stenton and Logan's views about public and life in the new United States, as well as a good deal of valuable historical and genealogical material related to the Norrises, Logans, and other early Pennsylvania families. Her style is fairly plain, without much in the way of rhetorical flourishes, and occasionally wry, as when she mentions that she once imagined living on an island "with all of God's creatures (rats and injurious ones excepted)". She evidently considers that she may be writing for future publication, as she refers on occasion to "my readers". Her unmarried son Algernon, who lived with her, died unexpectedly in 1835, and many journal entries from around that period are about her grief at his illness and loss.

After her husband died in 1821, Logan wrote an account of his life under the title Memoir of Dr. George Logan of Stenton, including excerpts from letters. It was not published until 1899.

Logan maintained an extensive correspondence, mainly with her sons Albanus and Algernon, but also with friends and fellow writers such as Hannah Griffitts. Although her letters deal largely with family news, they also demonstrate that she kept herself well informed on current events both in North America and Europe. She was an avid reader of travelogues and biographies. Logan also published a small amount of poetry, and some short verses are scattered throughout her diary.

Logan fell ill and died at Stenton on February 2, 1839. The 17 volumes of her original diary, along with other papers, are held by the Historical Society of Pennsylvania.
