= Ann Cooper Whitall =

American Quaker and seamstress during the Revolutionary War

- Born: Ann Cooper; 1716; Woodbury, New Jersey, U.S.
- Died: 1797 (aged 80–81)
- Relatives: David Cooper(brother) John Cooper(brother)

Ann Cooper Whitall (1716–1797) was a prominent Quaker woman in the colonial U.S. She was born in Woodbury, New Jersey to John and Ann Cooper on April 23, 1716. She married James Whitall in 1739 at age 23. Whitall kept a diary starting in about 1760 that contains important historical insight into the lives of people in the Red Bank area and Quaker family life in colonial times.

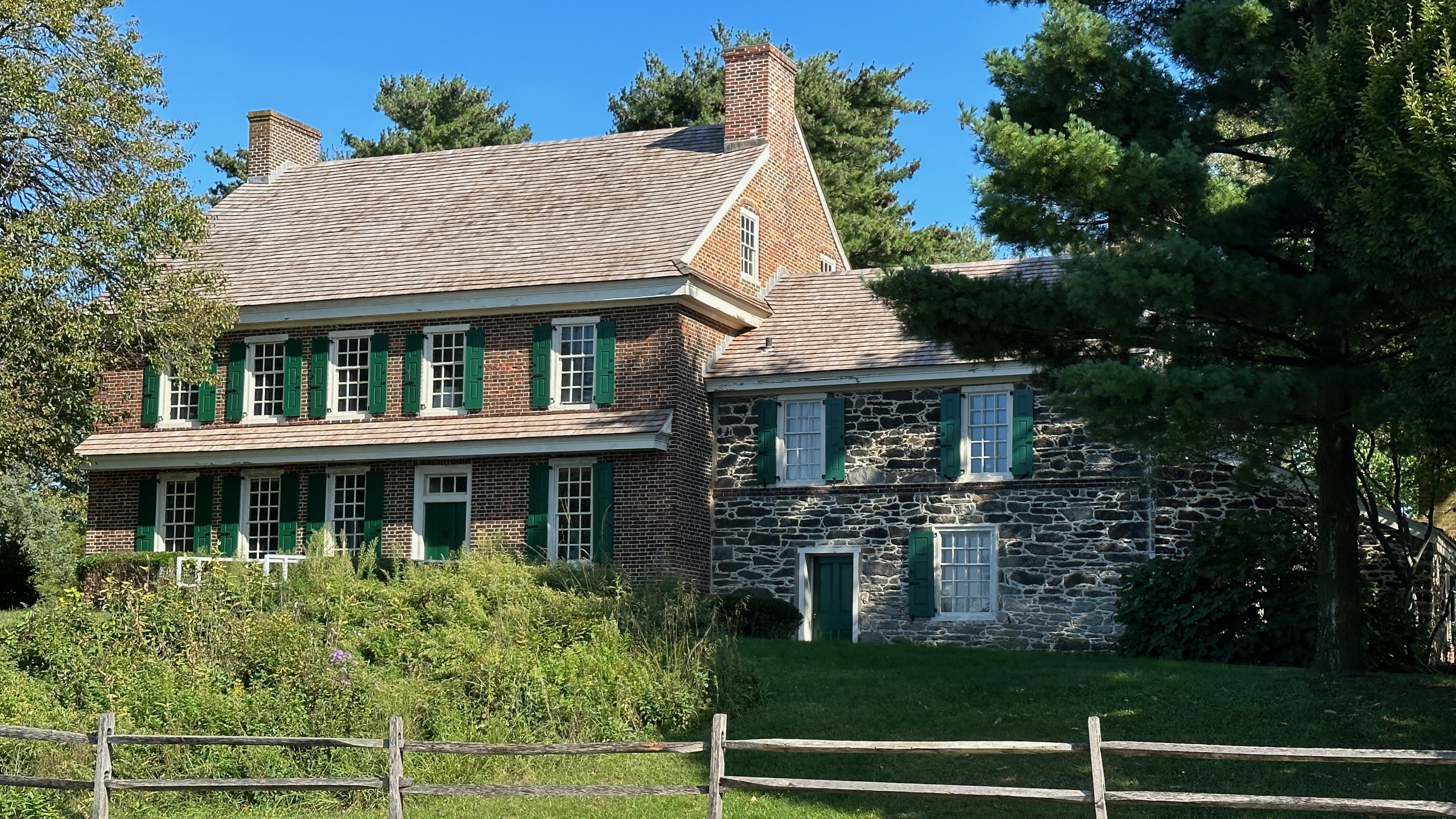
James and Ann Whitall House on the Red Bank Battlefield

Both devout Quakers, Ann and her husband were pacifists and remained neutral throughout the American Revolutionary War despite the immediate threat that the conflict posed to their home and livelihood.

Whitall would stay in her house during the 1777 Battle of Red Bank, even though British warships were firing cannon in that direction. There is a popular myth that a stray cannonball crashed through the house into the very room where Whitall sat working at a spinning wheel at which point she supposedly moved the spinning wheel down to the basement and kept working. According to Dr. Janofsky, though, director of the Red Bank Battlefield historical site, there is little evidence that the house was hit by cannon fire at all. The battle was a victory for the colonists, and afterwards Whitall opened her house to wounded on both sides. She gave them herbal medicines and bandaged their wounds. She is called the Heroine of Red Bank for her actions at that time.

Ann and James Whitall had nine children together, six sons and three daughters. Ann Whitall died in 1797 at age 82 during a yellow fever epidemic. Her remains are interred along with her husband's at the Friends Burial Ground in Woodbury, New Jersey.

The James and Ann Whitall House stands today, preserved, as part of the Red Bank Battlefield county park. Tours are available seasonally.

Ann Cooper Whitall's brother John Cooper served in the Continental Congress in 1776. Her grandson John Mickle Whitall was a sea captain and Quaker businessman who manufactured glass bottles in Millville, New Jersey. Her great-granddaughter Hannah Whitall Smith was a speaker and writer. One great-great-granddaughter M. Carey Thomas was a president of Bryn Mawr College. Another great-great-granddaughter was Alys Pearsall Smith, the first wife of Bertrand Russell.

Material on Ann Whitall, including a copy of her diary, is available in the Frank H. Stewart Collection at Rowan University Libraries Archives and Special Collection in Glassboro, New Jersey.

== See also ==
- New Jersey Women's Heritage Trail
