= 1795 United States Senate election in Pennsylvania =

The 1795 United States Senate election in Pennsylvania was held on February 26, 1795. William Bingham was elected by the Pennsylvania General Assembly to the United States Senate.

== Results ==
Incumbent Federalist Robert Morris, who was elected in 1788, was not a candidate for re-election to another term. The Pennsylvania General Assembly, consisting of the House of Representatives and the Senate, convened on February 26, 1795, to elect a new senator to fill the term beginning on March 4, 1795. The results of the vote of both houses combined are as follows:

State legislature results
Party	Candidate	Votes	%
Pro-Administration	William Bingham	58	56.86
Anti-Administration	Peter Muhlenberg	35	34.31
	Not voting	9	8.82
Total votes		102	100.0

== See also ==
- 1794–95 United States Senate elections

Preceded by 1788	Pennsylvania U.S. Senate election (Class III); 1795	Succeeded by 1801
