= Stenton (mansion) =

Historic house in Pennsylvania, United States

- U.S. National Register of Historic Places
- U.S. National Historic Landmark
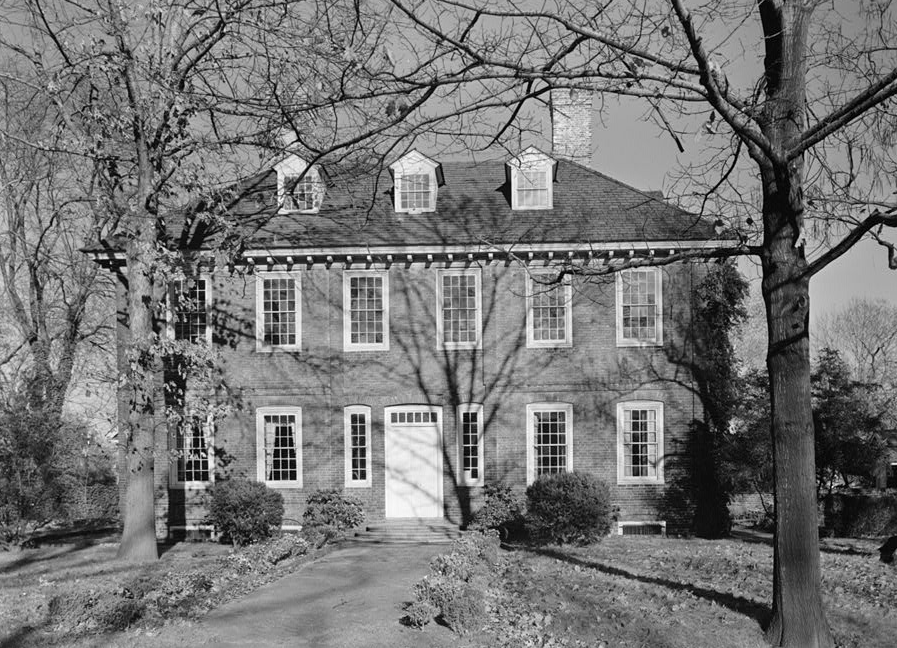
- Stenton mansion in November 1960
- Location: 4601 North 18th Street, Logan, Philadelphia, Pennsylvania, U.S.
- Coordinates: 40°1′25.6″N 75°9′16.6″W
- Area: 3 acres (12,000 m^{2})
- Built: 1723–1730
- Architect: John Nicholas (d. 1756), master builder
- Architectural style: American Georgian
- Website: https://www.stenton.org
- NRHP reference No.: 66000690
- Added to NRHP: January 12, 1965

Stenton, also known as the James Logan Home, was the country home of James Logan, the first Mayor of Philadelphia and Chief Justice of the Pennsylvania Supreme Court during the colonial-era governance of the Province of Pennsylvania. The home is located at 4601 North 18th Street in the Logan neighborhood of North Philadelphia.

Architect Charles Follen McKim once pronounced the home to be the finest example of colonial architecture in the United States.

== History ==
Stenton was named for Logan's father's Scottish birthplace, and was built between 1723 and 1730 on 511 acres (2.07 km^{2}) as the country seat of James Logan, who was recognized in his lifetime as "a universal man in the Renaissance tradition."

Logan arrived in Philadelphia in 1699 as William Penn's secretary. He went on to occupy pivotal roles in the governance of colonial-era Province of Pennsylvania for five decades, including mayor of Philadelphia, chief justice of the province's Supreme Court, and acting governor of the province. He assembled one of the best libraries in colonial America, discovered the vital role of pollen in the fertilization of corn (an achievement that caused Linnaeus to consider him "among the demigods of science"), and amassed a fortune in the fur trade.

The building is of red brick, with blackened headers. The roof atop its 2 1/2 stories is hipped.

Following Logan's death in 1751, Stenton was inherited by his son, William Logan (1717–1776), who chose to live in Philadelphia for most of the year and used it predominantly a summer residence. William Logan also built the kitchen and added many fine furnishings.

Following William's death in 1776, Stenton was inherited by his son, George Logan (1753–1821), a physician and later U.S. senator.

The house was part of Battle of Germantown in 1777. Both Continental Army general George Washington and British General Lord William Howe used it as a headquarters.

George Logan married Deborah Norris (1761–1839), a noted diarist and historian for whom Sally Wister's Journal was written in 1781.

=== 20th century ===
The mansion remained in the hands of the Logan family until 1910, when it was acquired by the City of Philadelphia.

== Museum ==
Stenton is now open as a historic house museum and is part of the Germantown Historic District.

In January 1965, in recognition of the house's historical value and notability, Stenton was designated a National Historic Landmark. The mansion lends its name to nearby Stenton Park and Stenton Avenue. The village of Stanton, New Jersey in Readington Township, New Jersey also borrows its name from the mansion.

== In popular culture ==
- In Summer 1999, Stenton was the location for the filming of various scenes in A Chronicle of Corpses, a film directed by Andrew Repasky McElhinney.

== See also ==
- List of National Historic Landmarks in Philadelphia
- List of Washington's Headquarters during the Revolutionary War
- National Register of Historic Places listings in North Philadelphia
- Wyck House
