= Benezet's School =

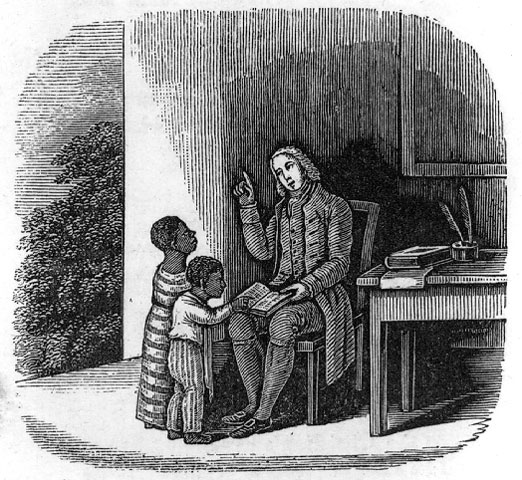
- Illustration of Benezet's School, founded in 1770 in Philadelphia
- Philadelphia, Pennsylvania; United States

Information
- Established: 1770
- Founder: Anthony Benezet

Benezet's School, also known as the African Free School and the Raspberry Street School, was a Philadelphia school for African Americans.

== History ==
Quaker teacher and abolitionist Anthony Benezet founded the school in 1770. Before opening a dedicated school building in 1773, the school held classes in several locations. Between 1773 and 1779, the school educated two hundred and fifty children, accepting free and enslaved children to ensure that classrooms were filled.

The school was known as both Benezet's School in honor of its founder and Raspberry Street School due to its location.

== Notable alumni ==
- Absalom Jones
- Richard Allen
- James Forten
