= List of abolitionist forerunners =

Thomas Clarkson (1760–1846), the pioneering English abolitionist, prepared a "map" of the "streams" of "forerunners and coadjutors" of the abolitionist movement, which he published in his work, The History of the Rise, Progress, and Accomplishment of the Abolition of the African Slave-Trade by the British Parliament published in 1808. The stylized map shows a riverine system with various branches representing the influences on the British and American abolition movements from before the seventeenth century to the late eighteenth century, which ultimately culminated in the British Parliament's passing of the Slave Trade Act. The list below is taken from Clarkson's map.

No women appear to be on the list other than Elizabeth I, although many in fact were involved in the movement including Hannah More, Joanna Baillie, and Anna Laetitia Barbauld. James Oglethorpe does not appear on the list, even though he and other Georgia Trustees prohibited slavery in the Province of Georgia. Oglethorpe later collaborated in opposing the slave trade with Granville Sharp, whom Clarkson describes as "the father of the cause in England". Slavery as both a moral and legal concern arose in the early days of the Georgia Colony, which prohibited slavery in 1735 and was challenged by neighbouring South Carolina, a slaveholding society.

Many others who warrant mention may not be acknowledged in Clarkson's list. A section is provided below for the addition of other forerunners.

== Clarkson's list ==
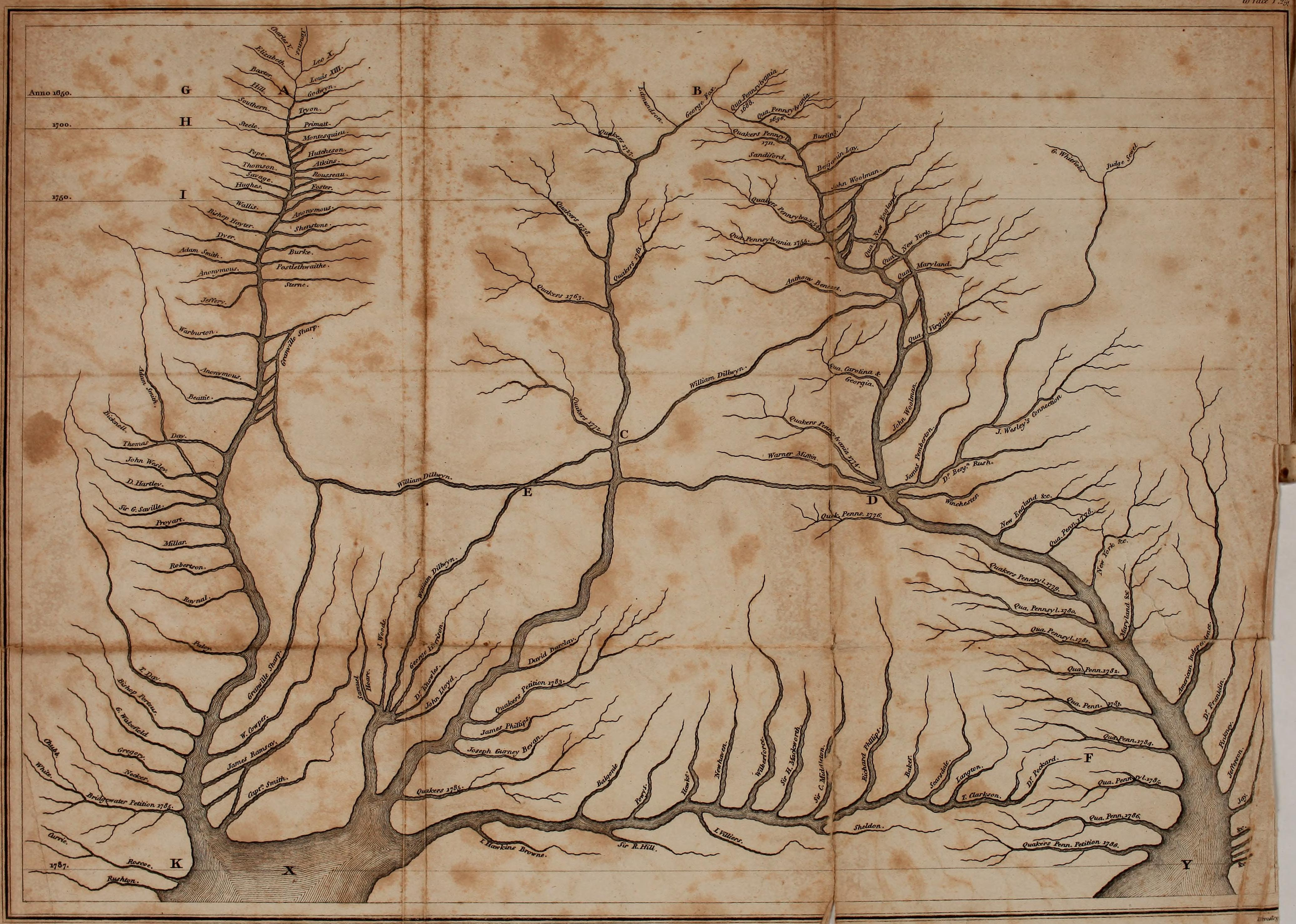
Clarkson's map

List of "forerunners and coajutors" on map:

=== Various forerunners to 1787 ===
- Cardinal Ximenes
- Charles V, Holy Roman Emperor
- Elizabeth I
- Pope Leo X
- Louis XIII
- Hill (Hill's Naval History)
- Richard Baxter
- Morgan Godwyn
- Southern (poet)
- Thomas Tryon
- Richard Steele
- Dr. Primatt
- Montesquieu
- Alexander Pope
- James Thomson
- Francis Hutcheson
- John Atkins
- Jean-Jacques Rousseau
- Richard Savage
- Foster
- Griffith Hughes
- Wallis
- Bishop Hayter
- William Shenstone
- John Dyer
- Edmund Burke
- Adam Smith
- Malachi Postlethwaite (not known if this is Malachy Postlethwayt, a defender of African trade)
- Laurence Sterne
- Thomas Jeffery
- William Warburton
- Granville Sharp
- James Beattie
- John Bicknell (Bickness?)
- Thomas
- John Wesley
- David Hartley
- Sir George Savile
- Abbe Liévin-Bonaventure Proyart
- Millan
- Robertson
- Guillaume Thomas François Raynal
- Dr. William Paley
- Thomas Day
- Bishop Porteus
- G. Wakefield
- William Cowper
- Dr. Gregory
- James Ramsay
- Jacques Necker
- John Chubb and George White (Bridgewater Petition, 1785)
- James Currie
- Captain J. S. Smith
- William Roscoe
- Edward Rushton

=== Early Quakers in England ===
- George Fox
- William Edmundson

=== Quakers and/or abolitionists in America from 1688 ===
- Quakers of Pennsylvania in 1688, 1696, 1711, 1754, 1755, 1774, 1776, 1779, 1780, 1781, 1782, 1783, 1784, 1785, 1786
- Quakers of New England
- Quakers of New York
- Quakers of Maryland
- Quakers of Virginia
- Quakers of Carolina and Georgia
- David Cooper
- John Blunston
- William Burling
- Ralph Sandiford
- Benjamin Lay
- John Woolman
- Anthony Benezet
- William Dillwyn
- Warner Mifflin
- James Pemberton
- George Whitefield
- Judge Sewel (Sewall)
- Benjamin Rush
- Winchester

=== Various Quakers and/or abolitionists in England and America ===
- Benjamin Franklin
- Thomas Jefferson
- John Jay
- William Dillwyn
- Joseph Woods (Sr.)
- Samuel Hoare Jr
- George Harrison
- Dr. Thomas Knowles
- John Lloyd
- David Barclay
- James Phillips
- Joseph Gurney Bevan
- Joseph Hancock, a Wisbech Quaker (helped Clarkson find a publisher for his essay "Is it right to make slaves of others against their will?")

=== Others, up to 1787 ===
- Dr. Peckard
- Thomas Clarkson
- Bennet Langton
- Lord Scarsdale
- Dr. Baker
- Richard Phillips
- Sheldon
- Sir Charles Middleton
- Sir Herbert Mackworth
- William Wilberforce
- John Villiers
- Powys (Lord Lilford) (possibly 1st baron)
- Sir Richard Hill (possibly 2nd Baronet)
- Lord Balgonie (Leven)
- L. Hawkins Browne

== Abolition forerunners not listed on the Clarkson map ==
Many of the London salons and circles of the 1770s and later took up the cause of antislavery, at least intellectually, thus paving the way for later action. Examples include Johnson's Circle, the Blue Stocking Society, and James Oglethorpe's associates.

- Magnus IV of Sweden
- Joanna Baillie
- Anna Laetitia Barbauld
- Samuel Johnson
- Margaret Middleton (née Gambier)
- Hannah More
- James Oglethorpe
- Olaudah Equiano
