= Underground railway =

Underground railway may refer to:

- Rapid transit, high-capacity public transport in urban areas
- Mine railway, an underground rail system used in mining

== See also ==
- Underground Railroad (disambiguation)
  - Underground Railroad, a network of clandestine routes by which African slaves in the 19th century United States attempted to escape
- London Underground
- List of metro systems
