= Charles T. Webber =

American painter (1825–1911)

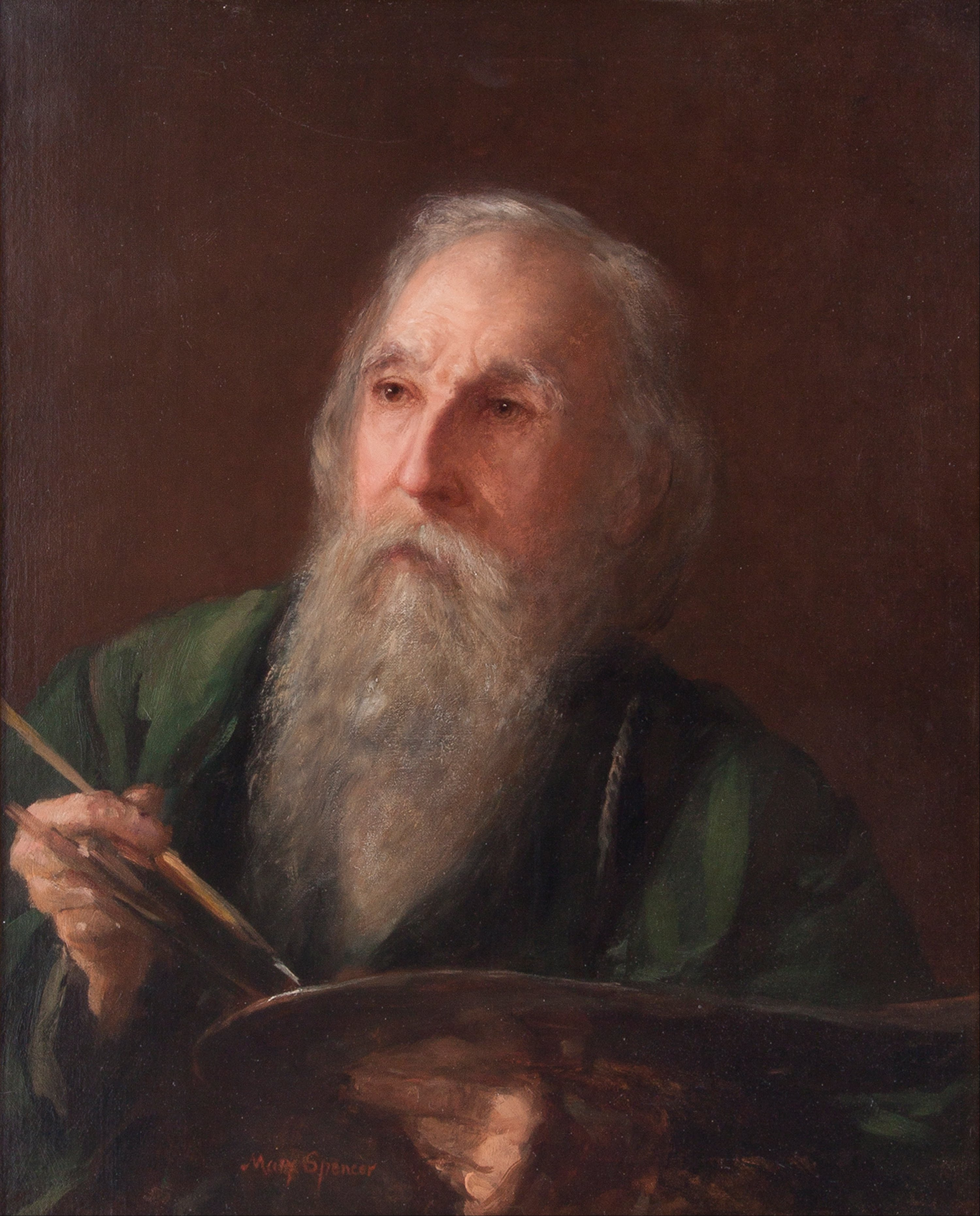
Mary Spencer, Charles T. Webber, 1910, Cincinnati Museum Center

Charles T. Webber (December 31, 1825 – 5 April 1911) was an American painter. Webber created hundreds of paintings during his lifetime, including portraits, landscapes, mythological and historical scenes, as well as genre subjects. He was an active member in Cincinnati’s art scene, founding many artistic groups, and was also a prominent figure in the Underground Railroad. In Cincinnati in particular, Webber was held in high regard due to his artistic achievements.

== Biography ==
=== Early life ===
Webber was born in Cayuga Lake, New York, on the 25th of December in 1825. When he was a child, Webber learned to paint and draw in a woodshed attic, which he used as his studio. Webber never had any formal art training as a youth. Aside from this, not much is known about Webber’s childhood.

=== Career ===
After moving to Springfield, Ohio, in 1844, Webber was befriended by a fellow artist by the name of John Peter Frankenstein, a German "émigré painter, who became his art teacher. Frankenstein, who taught Webber the medium of painting, is the only art teacher that Webber ever had. Once he had gained the skills, Webber was able to make a living through teaching students of his own, and by painting portraits.

Webber moved to Covington, Kentucky, in 1858. At this time, he was able to gain employment in David R. Hoag’s Cincinnati studio as a photograph tinter. After this, Webber went on to open the Artists’ Photographic and Picture Gallery with his partners, fellow artists Joseph Oriel Eaton and James Mullen selling portraits and photographs. Despite the business' success, the outbreak of the Civil War in 1861 caused the business to dissolve. This prompted Webber to move into his own art studio, which was located at 14 East Fourth Street. Webber remained in this studio, selling portraits, until the 1880s.

Through his involvement in many of Cincinnati's artistic groups and clubs, Webber was able to establish himself as an art educator. Through these ventures, he became a prominent and significant figure in Cincinnati's art scene.

Wanting to continue his career as an art educator, Webber took up a teaching position at the Ohio Mechanics Institute School of Design in 1878, teaching a life class.

=== Later years ===
During the later years of his life, Webber found time to learn the art of sculpture. In 1896, he created a bust of H. Thane Miller, who was the director of the Cincinnati House of Refuge, out of bronze.

In 1911, Webber died in his residence located in Riverside, Cincinnati, at the age of 85. He is buried in an unmarked grave which is located at Spring Grove Cemetery.

== Contributions to the Underground Railroad ==
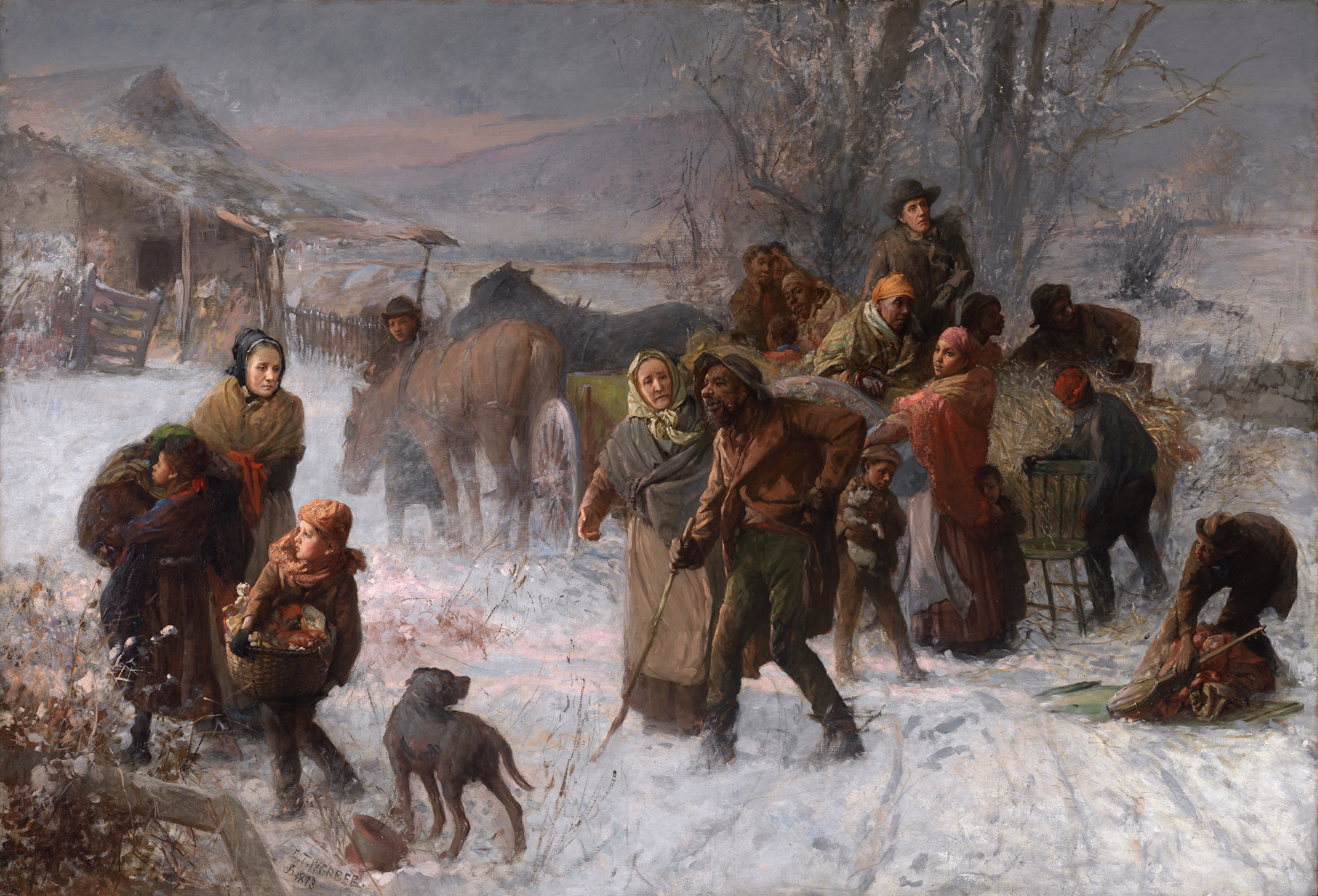
The Underground Railroad by Charles T. Webber, 1893

=== Painting ===
Webber's most famous contribution to the cause of the Underground Railroad is his painting of the same name. Webber completed this painting in 1893 for the World's Columbian Exposition of that year. The painting depicts a group of fugitives who are being led to freedom by abolitionists. Those depicted in the painting are friends of Webber—Hannah Haddock, Levi Coffin, and his wife, Catharine Coffin. Levi Coffin was a prominent abolitionist widely known throughout the movement. The painting is of particular significance to the movement because it focuses on the abolitionists themselves—specifically those who brought southern slaves to freedom in the northern states—rather than the slaves or the persecutors they fled.

== Contributions to the Artistic Scene in Cincinnati ==
On October 18, 1838, aiming to improve artistic facilities, The Cincinnati Academy of Fine Arts sponsored a number of exhibitions. Charles T. Webber sponsored a large loan exhibition of American and European art alongside various art collectors.

Webber was also involved in Cincinnati's Sketch Club. He described the club's beginning as simple, with the club maintaining a profound sense of internal harmony until some wealthy merchants and preachers were included as honorary members. These members proved to bring about the group's eventual undoing, with the final meeting taking place on August 6, 1864, in Leon van Loo's studio. The Sketch Club is said to have had a major influence on the evolution of Cincinnati's artists and the artistic scene.

In 1866, Webber assisted in the formation of an organisation which was named Associated Artists of Cincinnati. The organisation was founded by a group of amateur and more experienced artists who had a vision to make Cincinnati “the Art-center of the Great West”. As well as this, the group aimed to start an art school to provide the citizens of Cincinnati with a more comprehensive understanding of art. Webber was elected President of the organisation. On December 22, 1866, the group's first Annual Exhibition and Conversazione took place. Held in William Wiswell Jr's gallery, the exhibition included works by Thomas D. Jones, William P. Noble, and Henry Mosler (among others). In 1868, Associated Artists was absorbed by the Cincinnati Academy of Fine Arts.

By the 1890s, Webber was considered Cincinnati's senior resident artist. Until his death in 1911, Webber remained an active member of the artistic community in Cincinnati. After his death, his artist friends wanted to purchase one of Webber's paintings, ‘The Underground Railroad’, for the Cincinnati Art Museum. To do this, they started a subscription service to raise funds as a tribute to Webber. This gesture indicates the high regard in which Webber was held within the artistic community of Cincinnati, and the reputation he had created for himself within the art world of the 19th Century.

== Paintings ==
Webber created a number of paintings during his life, many of which contributed to his popularity among other artists in Cincinnati's art scene.

The painting by Webber which is most well-known is ‘Underground Railroad’, which he created for the 1893 World's Columbian Exposition. The painting is currently on display at the Cincinnati Art Museum.

‘Portrait of a Boy’, an oil painting, was painted by Webber in 1868. This was during the period where Webber worked in a portrait gallery in Cincinnati. Part of his job in the portrait gallery was selling portraits, which clients could have commissioned either by having a reference photograph taken to be painted or sitting across from Webber. The unidentified boy in this portrait appears joyful, which suggests that he sat across from Webber while the portrait was painted. The painting is currently on display at the Smithsonian American Art Museum.

== Achievements ==
Webber persuaded the organisers of the first Cincinnati Industrial Exposition to exhibit his art. The exposition took place in 1870, and Webber's art won a silver medal.

Webber's paintings were included in the Paris Salon exhibition of 1881, mainly due to his prominence in Cincinnati's artistic scene and his association with other well-known artists during the time period.

Webber's painting titled ‘Underground Railroad’, which he painted in 1893, was exhibited at the Chicago World's Exposition.

== Sources ==
Betjemann, Peter. 2017. "The Ends Of Time: Abolition, Apocalypse, And Narrativity In Robert S. Duncanson’s Literary Paintings". American Art 31 (3): 80-109. doi:10.1086/696116.

"Charles T. Webber". 2018. Smithsonian American Art Museum. Accessed September 4. https://americanart.si.edu/artist/charles-t-webber-5268.

"Discovering The Story | Underground Railroad". 2018. Discoveringthestory.Com. Accessed September 6. http://www.discoveringthestory.com/ugrr/background.asp#.

Gollar, C. Walker. 2007. "The Role Of Midwestern Christian Higher Education In The Abolition Of Slavery". Lillyfellows.Org. http://www.lillyfellows.org/media/1381/easter-2007-gollar.pdf.

"The Underground Railroad - Charles T. Webber (American, B.1825, D.1911) - Google Arts & Culture". 2018. Google Cultural Institute. Accessed September 4. https://artsandculture.google.com/asset/the-underground-railroad/cwGRLw8raEDwOg.

Weidman, J., Haverstock, M., Vance, J. and Meggitt, B. (2000). Artists in Ohio, 1787-1900. Kent: The Kent State University Press, pp. 917, 981–984.
