= Warner Mifflin =

American abolitionist (1745–1798)

Warner Mifflin (August 21, 1745 – October 16, 1798) was an American abolitionist and an early advocate of reparations for slavery. Born and raised in Virginia, Mifflin established himself as a planter in Delaware in 1769. As a member of the Society of Friends, he was strongly opposed to slavery and became dedicated to assisting slaves who tried to free themselves, to defending free blacks from abuse, as well as encouraging Quakers and others to free their slaves.

== Early life and family ==
Mifflin was born in Accomack County, Virginia on the Eastern Shore in 1745, into a slave-holding family descended from Quaker immigrants who arrived in New Jersey in 1677, one of the pioneering families of William Penn's "Holy Experiment". Although often sickly, he grew to be nearly seven feet tall, with a confident, charismatic personality. He was a second cousin of the more famous Thomas Mifflin of Pennsylvania. The several dozen slaves on the family's plantation produced cereals, flax, fruit, and livestock. The young Mifflin's conscience was troubled as he came to understand that the children he had played with growing up on his father's plantation were slaves.

His father, Daniel Mifflin, was one of the largest slaveholders in the county. Mifflin wrote that he became an abolitionist at the age of fourteen, after a conversation with a young man who was one of his father's slaves. He "determined never to be a slave-holder," but in 1767, he married Elizabeth Johns (c. 1749–1786), and her family provided them with a plantation in Kent County, Delaware and several slaves as a dowry. Their plantation's slaves produced many of the same foodstuffs, such as cereals and meat, that Mifflin's father's plantation had. Like his father, Mifflin also eagerly bought more land whenever possible.

Elizabeth was a lapsed Quaker who had become an Anglican, which briefly caused the Mifflins problems with the Duck Creek Quaker Meeting they sought to join, but both became reconciled with that meeting and were full members by 1769. After Elizabeth died, probably of cancer, Mifflin remarried in 1788 to Ann Emlen (1755–1815), another Quaker reformer. Of her pregnancies, two sons would survive to adulthood. In total, Mifflin fathered twelve children, six of whom died before they were four years old, and only five of whom survived to adulthood.

== Career ==
Although the Quakers' Pennsylvania Yearly Meeting had begun condemning slave-holding by Quakers in 1755, and despite Mifflin's previous commitment to never own slaves, it was only when the Yearly Meeting became militant about the problem that he became an activist. He was initially hesitant to free his slaves, but became convinced that it was sinful. A personal revelation caused him to fear damnation for his participation in slavery. Mifflin began freeing his own slaves in 1774, and convinced his father to do the same. Thomas Clarkson, an English abolitionist, wrote that Mifflin "was the first man in America to unconditionally emancipate his slaves." By the time his father Daniel liberated one hundred slaves in 1775, Mifflin was in the process of freeing twenty-two slaves and repurchasing five others he had previously sold in order to free them too. He entered into free labor contracts with them to keep his work force intact, and he provided schooling for their children. Beginning in 1775, Delaware Quakers inspired by Mifflin freed their slaves. As Quaker Meetings began requiring disowning of members for slave-keeping after 1776, Mifflin traveled extensively to encourage compliance, and to encourage non-Quakers like John Dickinson to liberate their slaves too.

During the American Revolutionary War, Warner Mifflin also became a leading Quaker peace activist, despite the danger of being associated with loyalism for doing so. He traveled several thousand miles on horseback through most of the Mid-Atlantic states and New England to promote his anti-war message on behalf of his fellow Quakers. In 1777, he passed through British lines to meet with General George Washington during the Battle of Germantown. His refusal to pay any taxes that would support the war effort resulted in seizures of part of his property by sheriffs.

Mifflin expanded the abolition campaign beyond what even most Quakers were likely to support, to as a pioneer in the idea that freed ex-slaves should receive reparations (or "restitution"), in the form of cash payments, land or shared crop arrangements. He also began to expound the Free Produce Movement, that is, not to buy or consume any products of slave labor. He also arranged tours of groups of former slaves into plantation areas to advertise the successes of free blacks, in order to discredit the anti-abolitionist argument that freed people would not work.

After the war, Mifflin became a leading exponent of abolition of the African trade and general abolition of slavery, putting pressure on state legislatures. He traveled widely in the Upper South states in this effort. He also began trying to halt the domestic slave trade, and to stop the kidnapping of free blacks to enslave them in other states. In 1788, he was one of the founders of Delaware's first abolition society. He was a member of the committee sent by the Pennsylvania Abolition Society to Congress in 1790 to present an abolition petition, which caused a prolonged and bitter debate. He met again with George Washington, now president, who remembered him from Germantown and treated him "with kindness and respect". In 1791, he sent a strong personal appeal to President Washington and Congress: his "memorial" on slavery. Congress returned the memorial with contempt, setting precedent for the later "gag rule" of 1836. Mifflin answered by publishing "A Serious Expostulation with the Members of the House of Representatives of the United States" (1793), which challenged the moral conscience of the congressmen. By the 1790s, his farm, Chestnut Grove, became a place of counsel for runaway slaves. For this, he was sued by slave owners, but this did not stop his activities. The frequency with which he would be asked for assistance increased throughout his life.

Mifflin was recognized in pre-revolutionary France for his views. In 1782, J. Hector St. John de Crèvecœur included an anecdote about him in his Letters from an American Farmer. Mifflin had a strong personal influence on Jacques Pierre Brissot, a French radical who visited America in 1788 and later became a leading Girondist in the French Revolution. Mifflin's last public event was the Quakers' Philadelphia Yearly Meeting in 1798, which was held during an outbreak of yellow fever. He ministered to the victims of the epidemic and ultimately died from the fever.

== Legacy ==
He was far in advance of most Americans in his political views. He believed not only that slavery should be abolished, but that African Americans wanted nothing more than a level playing field to demonstrate their natural equality with white people. He was usually more progressive in his views than most Quakers, and made substantial personal sacrifices of his own personal fortune to live up to his ideals. However, his typical Quaker self-effacement meant his political involvement was not as direct as it might have been, and he faced the antagonism of non-Quakers because Quakers' antiwar activity made them appear unpatriotic during the Revolution.

Mifflin was recognized internationally for his anti-slavery efforts. He is credited with freeing many African-Americans, including by Richard Allen. Jacques Pierre Brissot, a leading member of the Girondins who met Mifflin in 1788, wrote of him, "What humanity! What charity! It seems his only pleasure, his very existence, is to love and serve mankind." August von Kotzebue based a play called The Quaker off of Mifflin's war story, casting "Walter Mifflin" as the hero of the play. As a result of his efforts among others, 74% of the black population in Kent County, Delaware was free by 1800. President John Adams expressed sympathy with Mifflin's aims in response to having been sent a pamphlet written by him, however took a view that slavery must be abolished gradually.

His second wife, Ann, became an indefatigable itinerant reformer like him, traveling to the western states on various missions. She was the first woman to advocate the project for African colonization of former slaves, and one of the earliest proponents of the cultural assimilation, rather than removal, of Native Americans.

Warner Mifflin's numerous sisters and daughters also carried on his legacy of social reform, and Philadelphia's African Americans formed the African Warner Mifflin Society in the nineteenth century. Nevertheless, Mifflin declined into obscurity in the twentieth century. Gary B. Nash, a historian, published Warner Mifflin: Unflinching Quaker Abolitionist in an effort to revitalize interest and illustrate that he "was the key figure connecting the abolitionist movements before and after the American Revolution".

== See also ==
- David Cooper, contemporary abolitionist
- Thomas Garrett, another abolitionist Quaker who lived in Delaware
- 1688 Germantown Quaker Petition Against Slavery
