= Anthony Benezet =

French-born American abolitionist and teacher

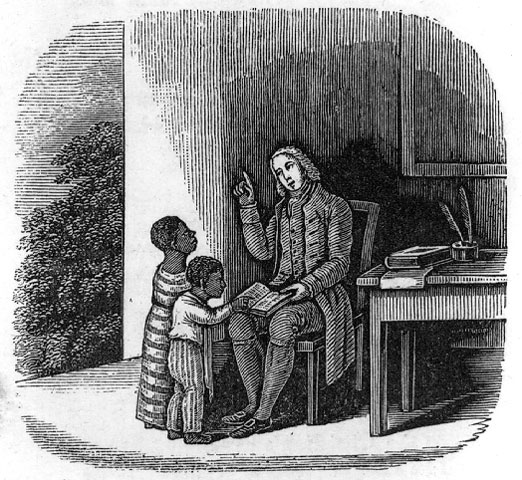
- "Benezet instructing colored children"' Illustration by John Warner Barber in a book from 1850
- Born: Antoine Bénézet; January 31, 1713; Saint-Quentin, Aisne, France
- Died: May 3, 1784 (aged 71); Philadelphia, U.S.
- Occupation: Teacher
- Known for: Advocacy for abolition

Pennsylvania Historical Marker
- Official name: Anthony Benezet (1713–1784)
- Type: City
- Criteria: African American, Education, Religion, Women, Writers
- Designated: June 04, 2016
- County: Philadelphia
- Location: 325 Chestnut St., Philadelphia; 39.94904°N 75.14721°W

Anthony Benezet (January 31, 1713 – May 3, 1784) was a French-born American abolitionist and teacher who was active in Philadelphia, Pennsylvania. A prominent member of the abolitionist movement in North America, Benezet founded one of the world's first anti-slavery societies, the Society for the Relief of Free Negroes Unlawfully Held in Bondage. He also founded the first public school for girls in North America and the Negro School at Philadelphia, which operated into the nineteenth century. Benezet advocated for kind treatment of animals, racial equality and universal love.

== Biography ==
Antoine was born in Saint-Quentin, France, to Jean-Étienne de Bénézet (later known as John Stephen Benezet) and his wife Judith de la Méjanelle, who were Huguenots (French Protestants). The Huguenots had been persecuted and suffered violent attacks in France since the 1685 revocation of the Edict of Nantes, which had provided religious tolerance. For a while his family had received protection owing to their powerful connections. However, in 1715 his father's goods were seized, so, like many others, the family left France rather than give up their religion. They moved first to Rotterdam, then briefly to Greenwich before settling in London, where there was a sizeable Huguenot refugee community. In 1727, Benezet joined the Religious Society of Friends (also known as Quakers). The company of Simon and Benezet represented the business interests of Voltaire in England, and the elder Benezet was personally involved with Voltaire when both men were settled in the French colony in Wandsworth.

In 1731, the Benezet family migrated to Philadelphia, Pennsylvania, founded by Quakers and one of the English colonies of North America. Then 18 years old, Anthony Benezet joined John Woolman as one of the earliest American abolitionists. Like Woolman, Benezet also advocated war tax resistance. Several years later in 1736, he married Joyce Marriott.

In Philadelphia, Benezet worked to persuade his Quaker brethren that slave-owning was not consistent with Christian doctrine. He believed that the ban on slavery in the British Isles should be extended to the North American and Caribbean colonies. (After the Americans gained independence in the Revolutionary War, Benezet continued to urge the United States to ban slavery, and the state of Pennsylvania legislated slavery's gradual abolition in 1780.)

After several years as a failed merchant, in 1739 Benezet began teaching at a Germantown school, then a separate jurisdiction northwest of Philadelphia. In 1742, he moved to the Friends' English School of Philadelphia (now the William Penn Charter School). In 1750 he added night classes for black slaves to his schedule.

In 1755, Benezet left the Friends' English School to set up his own school, the first public girls' school on the American continent. His students included daughters from prominent families, such as Deborah Norris and Sally Wister.

In 1770, he founded the Negro School at Philadelphia for black children. There was a growing free black community in Philadelphia, which increased after the state abolished slavery. Abolitionist sympathizers, such as Abigail Hopper Gibbons, continued to teach at Benezet's Negro School in the years before the American Civil War.

In 1775, he helped found the first anti-slavery society, the Society for the Relief of Free Negroes Unlawfully Held in Bondage. Eight years later in 1783, Benezet wrote a letter to Charlotte of Mecklenburg-Strelitz discussing "the cruelty of slavery and his opposition to the slave trade." After Benezet's death, Benjamin Franklin and Dr. Benjamin Rush reconstituted this association as the Pennsylvania Society for Promoting the Abolition of Slavery.

Benezet was known for his kindness to animals such as feeding rats in his garden. He was once offered chicken for dinner which he replied "What, would you have me eat my neighbors?". Benezet and his wife were alleged to be vegetarians but according to Jacob Lindley, a Quaker minister who dined with Benezet and his wife, they ate corn beef, cabbage and potatoes. Benezet was a teetotaller and supported the temperance movement. He authored a pamphlet in 1774, The Mighty Destroyer Displayed which influenced Benjamin Rush, an early temperance advocate.

== Legacy ==
The first anti-slavery newspaper article in the United States was published on March 8, 1775, in the Pennsylvania Journal and Weekly Advertiser, a newspaper based in Philadelphia. The article, titled "The Slavery of Negroes in America," was written by the Quaker writer and abolitionist Anthony Benezet, and it called for the abolition of slavery in all the colonies and the end of the slave trade worldwide. The estimated population of 1775 Philadelphia was 40,000 people, making it the biggest city in all the colonies.

In 1817, the abolitionist Roberts Vaux published a biography about Anthony Benezet.

== Works ==
- Observations on the inslaving [sp], importing and purchasing of Negroes. With some advice thereon, extracted from the Epistle of the yearly-meeting of the people called Quakers held at London in the year 1748., 1760

This brief work, written while Benezet was teaching at the Quaker Girls' School in Philadelphia, was the author's first publication to draw on sources documenting the African trade in slavery.

- An Epistle of Caution and Advice, Concerning the Buying and Keeping of Slaves, 1754
- A short account of that part of Africa inhabited by the negroes, 1762
- A Caution and Warning to Great Britain and her Colonies, in a short representation of the calamitous state of the enslaved negroes in the British Dominions. Collected from various authors, etc., 1767
- Some Historical Account of Guinea ... With an inquiry into the rise and progress of the slave-trade ... Also a republication of the sentiments of several authors of note on this interesting subject; particularly an extract of a treatise by Granville Sharp, 1771
- The potent enemies of America laid open : being some account of the baneful effects attending the use of distilled spirituous liquors, and the slavery of the Negroes : to which is added, The happiness attending life, when dedicated to the honour of God, and good of mankind, in the sentiments of some persons of eminence near the close of their lives, viz. the Earl of Essex, Count Oxcistern, H. Grotius, D. Brainard, John Lock, &c., 1774.
- The mighty destroyer displayed, in some account of the dreadful havock made by the mistaken use as well as abuse of distilled spirituous liquors, 1774.
- Some observations on the situation, disposition, and character of the Indian natives of this continent, 1784.

== See also ==
- Benjamin Rush
- David Cooper (abolitionist) contemporary abolitionist, authored book, coauthored by Benezet
- List of abolitionist forerunners
