= John Cooper (New Jersey politician) =

Quaker abolitionist in American Revolution

- Born: January 16, 1730; Woodbury, Province of New Jersey
- Died: April 1, 1785 (aged 55)
- Relatives: David Cooper (brother) Ann Cooper Whitall(sister)

John Cooper (January 16, 1730 – April 1, 1785) was a political leader of the American Revolution in New Jersey. He was likely the main author of the New Jersey Constitution of 1776, and served as one of the first judges of Gloucester County. An outspoken abolitionist, Cooper called for New Jersey to end slavery immediately, and argued against a more gradual approach to emancipation. A Quaker who was disowned by the Society of Friends for his political actions during the revolution, he was likely buried in the Quaker cemetery in Woodbury, New Jersey, in an unmarked grave. He was the estranged younger brother of Quaker abolitionist David Cooper.

== Early life ==
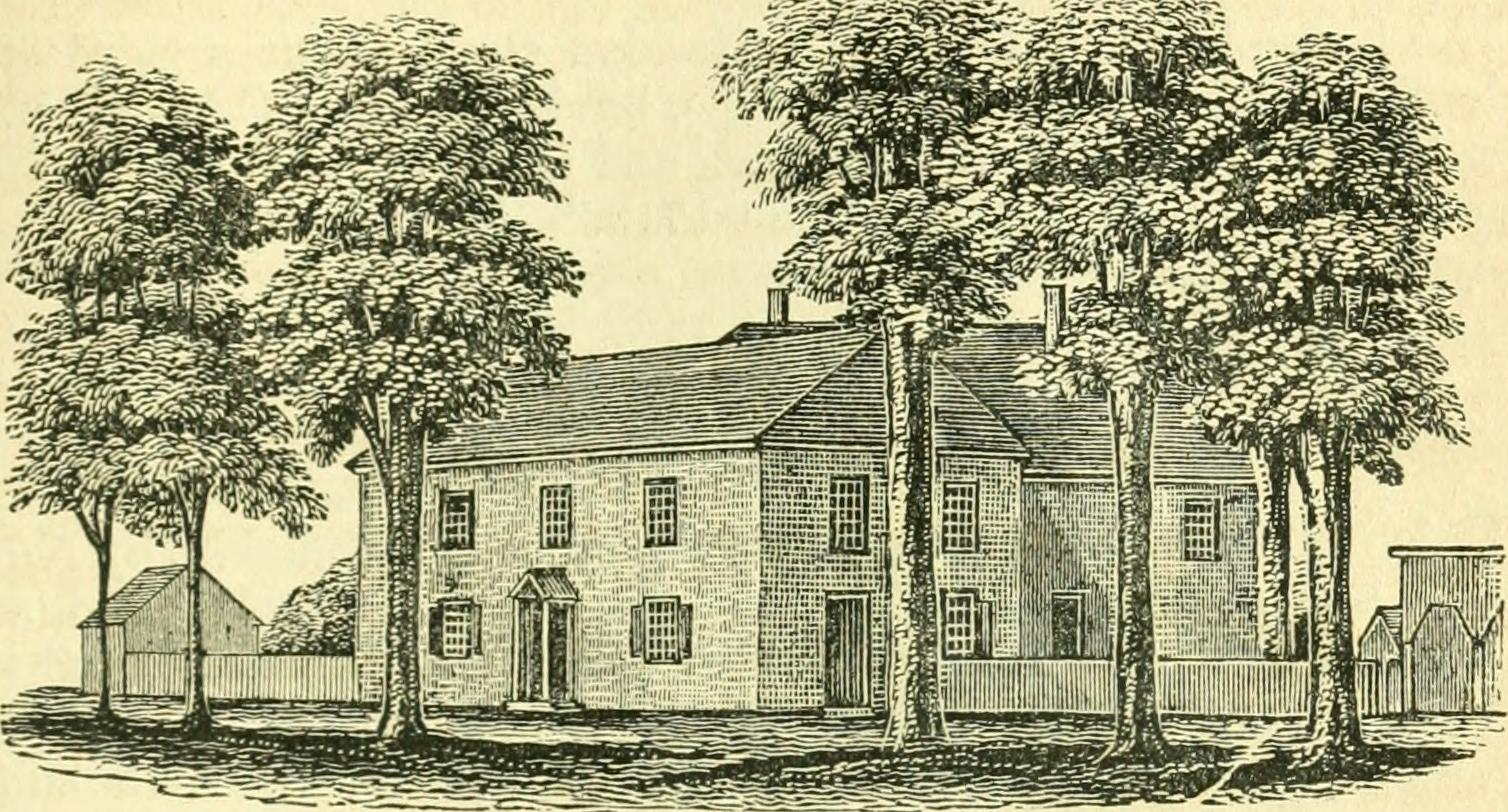
Quaker meeting house in Haddonfield, New Jersey, where the Cooper brothers were educated

Cooper was born near Woodbury in Gloucester County, New Jersey, the youngest of eight children born to John Cooper Sr. and Ann Cooper (née Clarke). His paternal grandfather, William Cooper, was a minister in Hertfordshire, England, who knew George Fox, the founder of the Religious Society of Friends, and emigrated to southwestern New Jersey in the 1600s. His maternal grandfather, Benjamin Clarke, was an early Quaker abolitionist who emigrated around the same time.

He was named after an older sibling named John Jr. who died one year before his birth. His brother David was five years old when John was born in 1729. On September 22, 1730, their father John Cooper Sr. died when John Jr. was only ten months old. Raised by their mother who was a devout Quaker, the Cooper brothers received their education at the Friends meeting house in Haddonfield.

== Philadelphia years ==
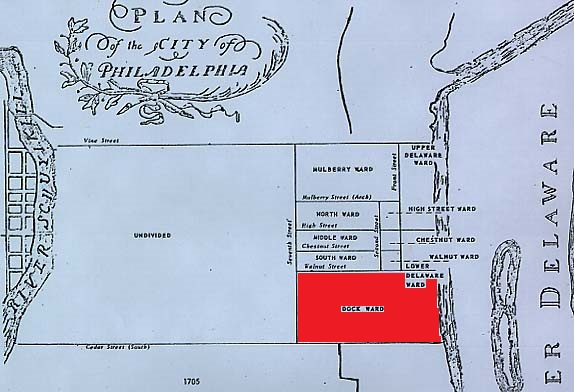
Dock Ward of Philadelphia, where John Cooper lived from 1751 to 1774

John Cooper lived with his older brother David starting in 1751, but left for Philadelphia in 1756 to "enter into trade"; unlike David, who had inherited real estate property, John received a monetary inheritance only. He lived in the Dock Ward of Philadelphia, and was influenced by Philadelphian leaders such as Timothy Matlack, a former Quaker who was David's brother-in-law and was disowned by the Society of Friends for his support for American independence. Quaker doctrine at the time stipulated that Friends should adhere to pacifism by distancing themselves from revolutionary activity.

== Political career in New Jersey ==
In 1774, Cooper left Philadelphia and returned to Woodbury, where he bought a plot of land, and lived with David while his new home was built. (Note: Other sources have claimed that the house was built as early as 1768.) He continued to conduct business in Philadelphia and owned some property there.

John Cooper's house at 16 North Broad Street, Woodbury, was a "substantial" red-brick building with large fireplaces, walls with fine wood paneling, and a "well-filled wine cellar". He developed a reputation as an excellent host, regularly welcoming officers from the Continental Army and other notable figures to his home.

=== Provisional and Continental Congresses ===
Preamble to the New Jersey Constitution of 1776

In May 1775, he was selected as a member of the Gloucester County Committee of Correspondence, and was treasurer of the Western Division of New Jersey. Cooper served in the Provincial Congress of New Jersey in 1775 and 1776, and voted to "oust, arrest, and deport" Royal Governor William Franklin, who denounced the Congress.

In February 1776, Cooper was selected as a delegate to the Second Continental Congress, along with William Livingston, John De Hart, Richard Smith, and Jonathan Dickinson Sergeant, but as of mid-June 1776, they had not been authorized by the colonial government to vote for independence. De Hart, Smith, and Dickinson Sergeant resigned their positions, while Cooper appears not to have attended meetings, as his name does not appear in the published minutes. On June 21, 1776, the Provincial Congress formed a new state government, which selected new delegates from New Jersey, who were approved to sign the Declaration of Independence.

=== New Jersey Constitution and Legislative Council ===
Cooper served on the committee that drafted New Jersey's first constitution, and was likely its principal author. For many years, historians believed that Jonathan Dickinson Sergeant was the main author of the New Jersey constitution, as claimed in a 1929 book by Charles R. Erdman Jr. However, Irwin N. Gertzog's discovery of "The First Draught of the Constitution of New Jersey", a manuscript in John Cooper's handwriting, has given credence to the view that Cooper was the lead author, at least initially. The puzzle of who the "true" author was may never be confirmed with complete certainty.

On July 2, 1776, following the ratification of the first New Jersey Constitution, Cooper was elected to the New Jersey Legislative Council as the representative from Gloucester County, a position he held until 1782.

=== Relationship with the Society of Friends ===
Because of his political involvement with the American Revolution, the Society of Friends finally disowned John Cooper in 1776, and he became estranged from his family. According to historian Bill L. Smith, Cooper was "explicitly disowned for not embodying Quaker standards of masculinity such as piety, pacifism, humility, and discipline." John and his brother David never spoke again for the rest of their lives.

=== British occupation of house ===
On November 16, 1777, British General Charles Cornwallis crossed the Delaware River from Chester, Pennsylvania, and captured Fort Billingsport. After marching into Woodsbury, Cornwallis commandeered John Cooper's house, because it was "the finest and best equipped home in the section", and used it as his temporary headquarters for three days, from November 21 to 24, 1777. Cooper locked his closets before fleeing to the home of his sister Ann Whitall, who lived in a farmhouse at Red Bank, on the Delaware River. The third floor of the house was used as a makeshift hospital by the British, who left bayonet marks on the doors and wood panels, possibly looking for silver and other valuables. While Cornwallis and his officers stayed at the Cooper House, their troops camped on the grounds of the Woodbury Friends' Meetinghouse.

=== Abolitionist activity ===
On September 20, 1780, Cooper published an article in the New Jersey Gazette denouncing slavery and taking the unpopular view that emancipation should happen immediately, rather than gradually. Going against the convention of writing under a pseudonym, he signed his article "JOHN COOPER" in all capital letters, and made what legal historian William Wiecek has called "a secular plea for immediatism, based on Revolutionary ideology". Cooper wrote:

We say, “all men are equally entitled to liberty, the pursuit of happiness;” but are we willing to grant this liberty to all men? If after we have made such a declaration to the world, we continue to hold our fellow creatures in slavery, our words must rise up in judgement against us; and by the breath of our own mouths we must stand condemned.

That year, he proposed legislation in the State Council to abolish slavery, but was unsuccessful in convincing New Jersey legislators, and bills for gradual emancipation failed in 1783, 1785, and after his death. New Jersey was the last northern state to abolish slavery.

=== County court ===
In 1779, Cooper was elected President Judge of the Common Pleas Court of Gloucester County. Re-elected in 1784, he served until his death on April 1, 1785, at the age of 55.

== Legacy ==
Judge Cooper died a bachelor and left his estate to his friend Dr. Thomas Hendry, a Continental Army surgeon. He is understood to be buried in an unmarked grave at the Woodbury Friends Burial Ground. Cooper Street in Woodbury is named after John Cooper.

From 1932 to 1964, the house he built at 16 North Broad Street, Woodbury, had a plaque that read, "Headquarters of Lord Cornwallis, November, 1777". A new historical marker installed in 1964 called it the Cooper House, with the inscription, "Built by John Cooper, one of the drafters of the first state constitution, and war-time legislator. Cornwallis' Quarters, 1777." Although the house no longer stands, the wood paneling from the second-floor bedroom wall was saved and used inside the north wall of the Gloucester County Historical Society Library.
