= The Underground Railroad (painting) =

Painting by Charles T. Webber

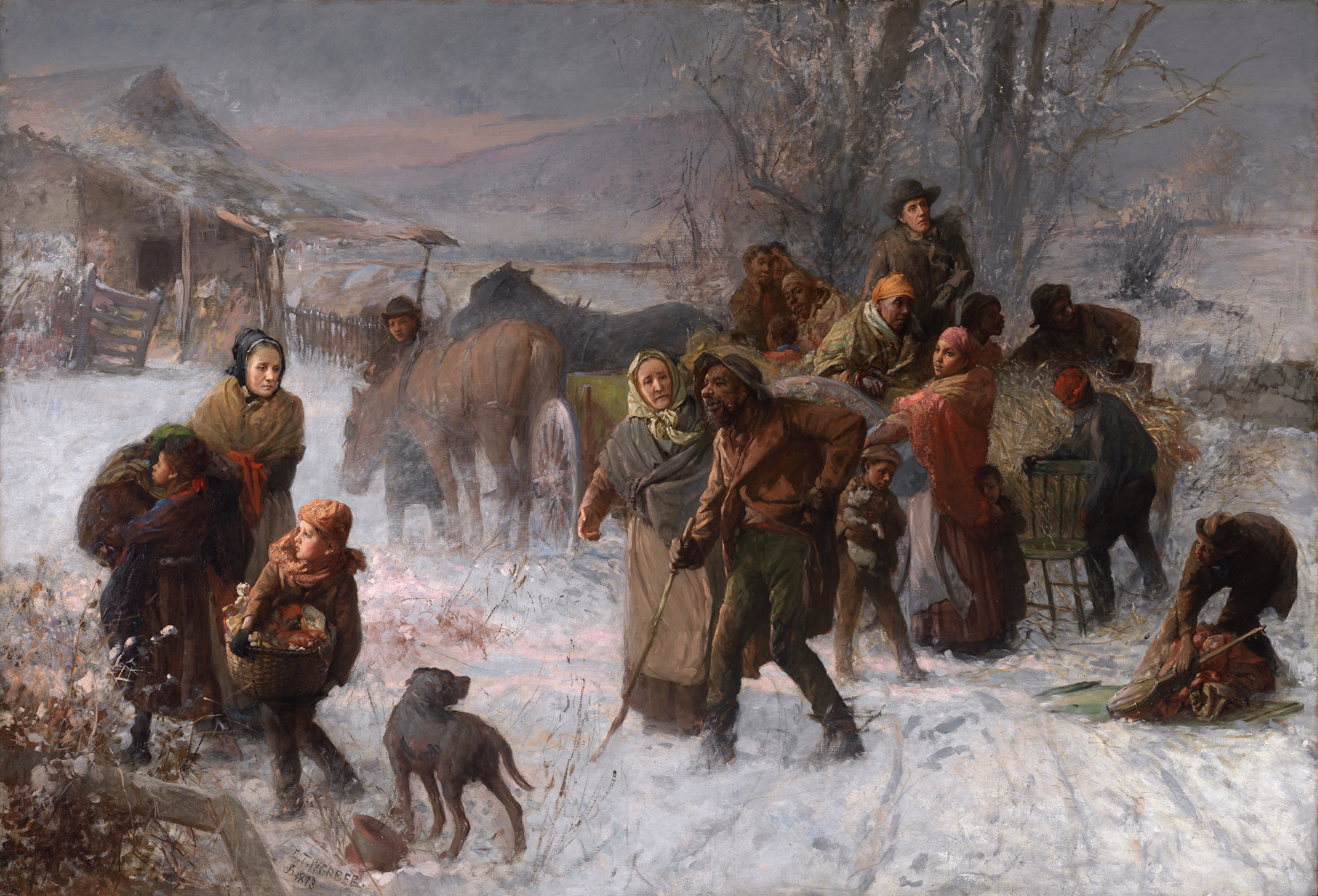
The Underground Railroad (1893) by Charles T. Webber

The Underground Railroad, also called Fugitives Arriving at Levi Coffin's Indiana Farm, a Busy Station of the Underground Railroad, is the best known of artist Charles T. Webber's paintings. The painting shows a large family of escaped Southern slaves being received in the Northern winter by a group of white abolitionists led by Quaker Levi Coffin.

== Background ==
The Weber painting shows black slaves, fugitives from the south, being guided through the snow to shelter at the Indiana farm of Levi Coffin and his wife. The family helping the slaves are Quakers. The painting includes two common stereotypes of the Underground Railroad: helpless slaves and their heroic Quaker saviors. Mary Ellen Snodgrass writes:

The focus of the dramatic grouping reflects the daring and resourcefulness of blacks, old and young, in fleeing the South. The scenario honors stationkeepers in cold northern climes, which Webber depicted with an icy white background.

Hannah Haydock, another abolitionist, is also present at the scene as Coffin, standing on the wagon, is shown helping the slaves with his wife, Catherine.

== W. H. Siebert ==
The painting was exhibited prominently at a Chicago fair in 1893; Wilbur Henry Siebert, in attendance at the fair, found the subject of the painting particularly poignant. The young instructor, so moved by the emotional experience of viewing the painting, published his own book on the subject of the Underground Railroad five years later. This volume gave "scholarly sanction" to subsequent materials proliferated on the subject of the railroad. These later works were a mix of fact and legend. Siebert included a photo of the painting in The Underground Railroad from Slavery to Freedom (1898).

After the artist's death in 1911 the painting was purchased for the Cincinnati Art Museum.
