= George Logan (Pennsylvania politician) =

American politician (1753–1821)

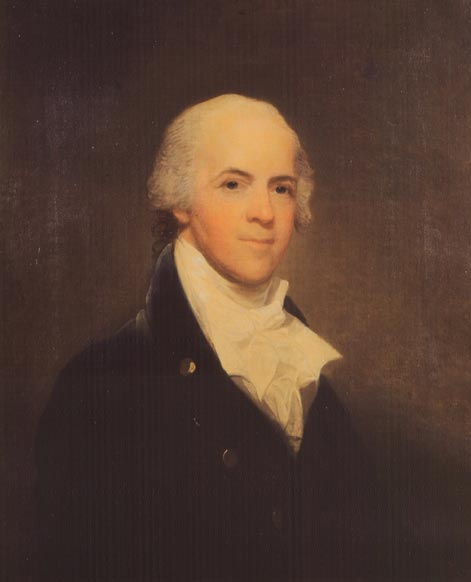

United States Senator from Pennsylvania
- In office July 13, 1801 – March 4, 1807
- Preceded by: Peter Muhlenberg
- Succeeded by: Andrew Gregg

Personal details
- Born: September 9, 1753 Philadelphia, Province of Pennsylvania, British America
- Died: April 9, 1821 (aged 67) Philadelphia, Pennsylvania, U.S.
- Party: Democratic-Republican
- Spouse: Deborah Norris (m. 1781)
- Children: 3 sons

George Logan (September 9, 1753 – April 9, 1821) was an American medical doctor, farmer, legislator and politician from Philadelphia County, Pennsylvania. He served in the Pennsylvania state legislature and represented Pennsylvania in the United States Senate.

== Early life, education, and marriage ==
George Logan was born in Philadelphia, Pennsylvania, on September 9, 1753.

As a child, he was sent to England for schooling, and later his Loyalist family again sent him overseas when the American Revolution broke out, this time to get medical training. He graduated from the University of Edinburgh Medical School in 1779.

He returned to the United States in 1780, and in 1781 he married Deborah Norris, who went on to become a noted historian and diarist. Two years later they moved into Stenton, a mansion built in the Germantown area of Philadelphia by James Logan that is now open to the public. Partly due to the demands of restoring and maintaining Stenton, Logan gave up his career as a physician and became a gentleman farmer and politician.

At Stenton, the couple entertained a wide circle of politicians, artists, writers, and businesspeople, counting among their friends Thomas Jefferson and the painter Charles Willson Peale. They were music lovers and had an admiration for many composers including Haydn, Mozart, Clementi and Pleyel.

The Logans had three sons.

== Career ==
Despite his Loyalist background, Logan took part in the political life of the new United States. In 1785 he was elected to the Pennsylvania legislature, serving for four years; and he was elected for another term in the late 1790s.

In 1790, he was disowned by the Society of Friends (Quakers) for having joined a militia, which engaged in activities wholly antithetical to the Quakers' pacifist views.

A Jeffersonian Republican, in 1793 he helped to found the Democratic-Republican Societies. That same year, Logan was elected to the American Philosophical Society. An accomplished farmer, he was also a founder of the Pennsylvania Society for the Promotion of Agriculture.

In 1798, he went to Paris to negotiate peace with the French to settle the Quasi-War. On his return, he found he had been denounced by the anti-Jeffersonian Federalists, who had passed a statute informally known as the "Logan Act", which made it a crime for an individual citizen to interfere in a dispute between the United States and a foreign country.

In 1801, as Jefferson's presidency began, Logan ran for the open U.S. Senate seat previously held by William Bingham, who was retiring. He narrowly lost to Peter Muhlenberg. However, when Muhlenberg resigned in June of that year, Logan ran for the seat once again and won overwhelmingly against congressman Joseph Hiester.

Logan's reputation was mixed. With reference to his political activities, he was called at various times a "busybody" and a "great fool", but Jefferson considered him "the best farmer in Pennsylvania, both in theory and practice."

Logan died in 1821, and not long afterwards Deborah Logan wrote an account of his life under the title Memoir of Dr. George Logan of Stenton, including excerpts from letters. It was published in 1899.

== See also ==
- Stenton (mansion)

U.S. Senate
| Preceded by J. Peter Muhlenberg | U.S. senator (Class 3) from Pennsylvania; 1801–1807; Served alongside: James Ross, Samuel Maclay | Succeeded by Andrew Gregg |
