= 1798–99 United States House of Representatives elections =

House elections for the 6th U.S. Congress

- April 24, 1798 – August 1, 1799

All 106 seats in the United States House of Representatives 54 seats needed for a majority
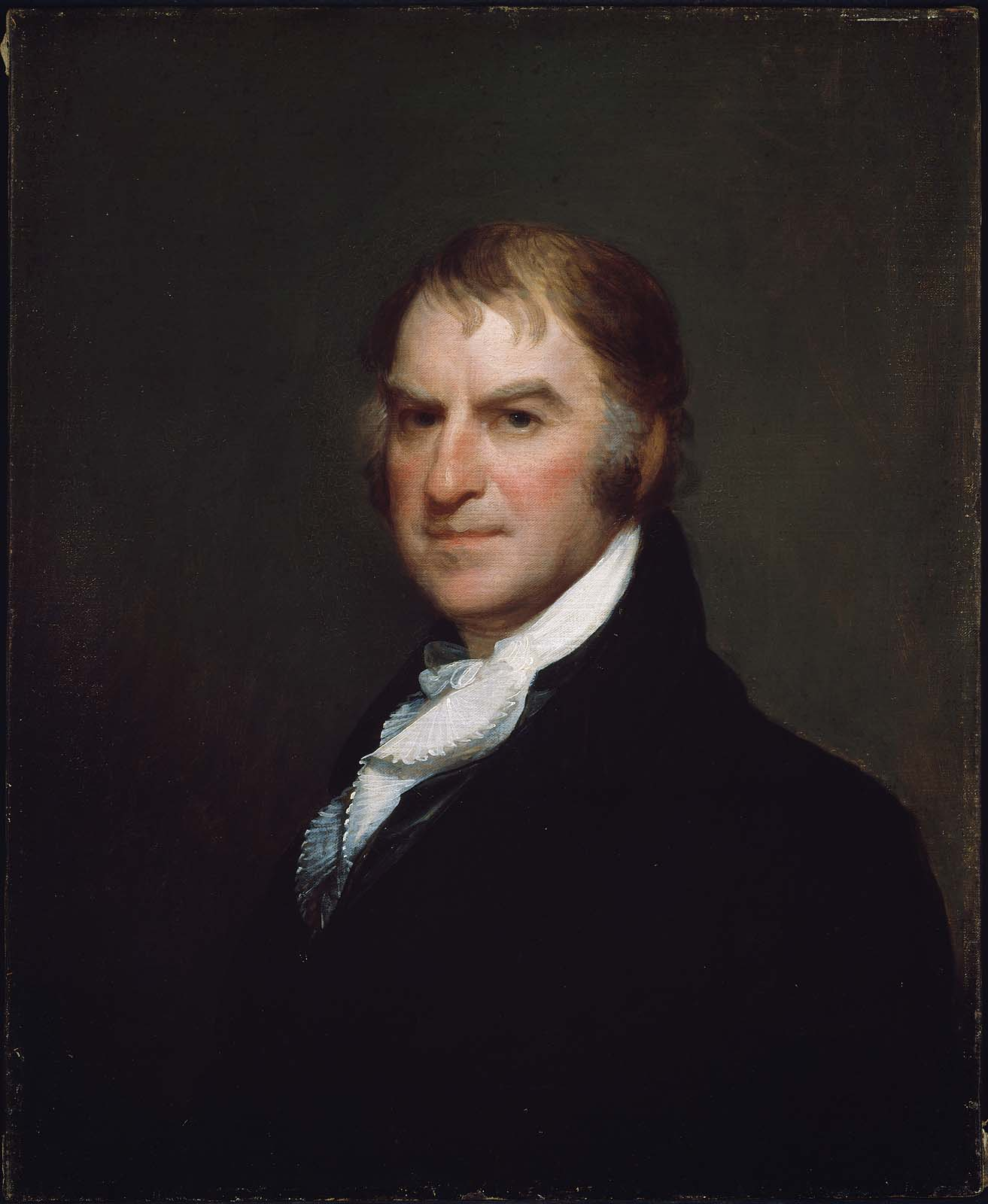

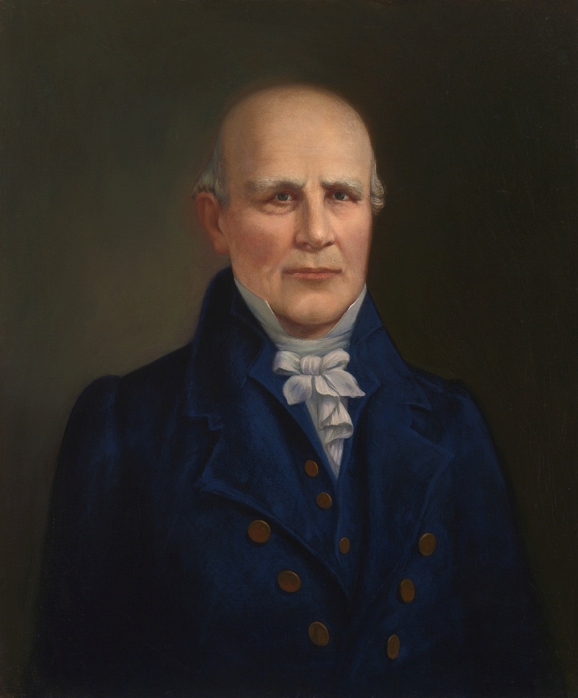
	Majority party	Minority party
Leader	Theodore Sedgwick	Nathaniel Macon
Party	Federalist	Democratic-Republican
Leader's seat	Massachusetts 1st	North Carolina 5th
Last election	57 seats	49 seats
Seats won	60	46
Seat change	▲3	▼3
- Results: Federalist hold Federalist gain Democratic-Republican hold Democratic-Republican gain Undistricted
Speaker before election
Jonathan Dayton
Federalist
Elected Speaker
Theodore Sedgwick
Federalist

The 1798–99 United States House of Representatives elections were held on various dates in various states between April 24, 1798, in New York and August 1, 1799, in Tennessee. Each state set its own date for its elections to the House of Representatives, with some after the official start of the 6th United States Congress on March 4, 1799, but before the start of the first session of this Congress in Philadelphia on December 2, 1799. These elections were held during President John Adams' term. It was the last congressional session before the move to the new capital at Washington, D.C. Elections were held for all 106 seats, representing 16 states.

President Adams, a Federalist elected two years prior in the election of 1796, remained popular during a time of national economic growth, and the Federalists made a modest gain of three seats at the expense of the opposition Democratic-Republicans, the party of Vice President and future President Thomas Jefferson. This resulted in an increased Federalist majority in the House, 60-46 seats.

The Federalist party squandered its popularity by passing a series of controversial new laws in the summer of 1798, including the Naturalization Act of 1798 and the Alien and Sedition Acts. Their passage seriously injured the chances of President Adams and Federalist congressional candidates in the elections of 1800.

The House that met during this Congress would ultimately elect Thomas Jefferson over Aaron Burr in the presidential election of 1800.

== Election summaries ==

↓
60	46
Federalist	Democratic-Republican

State	Type	Date	Total seats	Federalist		Democratic- Republican	
State	Type	Date	Total seats	Seats	Change	Seats	Change
New York	Districts	April 24–26, 1798	10	4	▼2	6	▲2
New Hampshire	At-large	August 2, 1798	4	4	Steady	0	Steady
North Carolina	Districts	August 10, 1798	10	4	▲3	6	▼3
Connecticut	At-large	September 7, 1798	7	7	Steady	0	Steady
Maryland	Districts	October 1, 1798	8	5	▼1	3	▲1
Rhode Island	At-large	August 28, 1798	2	2	Steady	0	Steady
Vermont	Districts	September 4, 1798 (Note: An additional trial was held in one district due to majority requirement not being on the first vote, and was held on December 4, 1798)	2	1	Steady	1	Steady
Delaware	At-large	October 2, 1798	1	1	Steady	0	Steady
Georgia	At-large	October 8, 1798	2	2	▲2	0	▼2
Pennsylvania	Districts	October 9, 1798	13	5	▼1	8	▲1
New Jersey	District	October 10, 1798	5	2	▼3	3	▲3
South Carolina	Districts	October 12, 1798	6	5	▲2	1	▼2
Massachusetts	Districts	November 5, 1798 (Note: Additional trials required in 2 districts due to majority requirement not being met on first vote, additional trials were held January 17, April 1, June 6, and August 29, 1799)	14	12	▲1	2	▼1
Late general elections (After the March 4, 1799, start of the next Congress)
Virginia	Districts	April 24, 1799	19	6	▲2	13	▼2
Kentucky	Districts	May 7, 1799	2	0	Steady	2	Steady
Tennessee	At-large	August 1, 1799	1	0	Steady	1	Steady
Total			106	60 56.6%	▲3	46 43.4%	▼3

House seats
Federalist	56.60%
Dem-Republican	43.40%

== Special elections ==
There were special elections in 1798 and 1799 during the 5th United States Congress and 6th United States Congress.

Elections are sorted here by date then district.

=== 5th Congress ===
District	Incumbent			Results	Candidates
District	Representative	Party	First elected	Results	Candidates
Pennsylvania 4	Samuel Sitgreaves	Federalist	1794	Incumbent resigned sometime in 1798. New member elected October 9, 1798 and seated December 4, 1798. Democratic-Republican gain. Winner also elected to the next term on the same day; see below.	▌ ✓ Robert Brown (Democratic-Republican) 62.1%; ▌Jacob Everly (Federalist) 37.9%
North Carolina 10	Nathan Bryan	Democratic- Republican	1795	Incumbent died June 4, 1798. New member elected August 2, 1798 and seated December 10, 1798. Democratic-Republican hold. New member also elected to the next term one week later; see below.	▌ ✓ Richard Spaight (Democratic-Republican) 51.2%; ▌Thomas Badger (Federalist) 48.8%
Pennsylvania 1	John Swanwick	Democratic- Republican	1794	Incumbent died July 31, 1798. New member elected October 9, 1798 and seated December 3, 1798. Federalist gain. Winner elected to the next term on the same day; see below.	▌ ✓ Robert Waln (Federalist) 69.5%; ▌Samuel Miles (Democratic-Republican) 30.5%
Connecticut at-large	Joshua Coit	Federalist	1792	Incumbent died September 5, 1798. New member elected October 22, 1798 and seated December 3, 1798. Federalist hold. Winner had already been elected to the next term; see below.	▌ ✓ Jonathan Brace (Federalist); [data missing]
Virginia 9	William Giles	Democratic- Republican	1790 (special)	Incumbent resigned October 2, 1798. New member elected November 1, 1798 and seated December 3, 1798. Democratic-Republican hold. Winner later elected to the next term; see below.	▌ ✓ Joseph Eggleston (Democratic-Republican); ▌Alexander Jones (Unknown) (Note: Eggleston "was elected by a majority of more than two to one…")
Maryland 7	Joshua Seney	Democratic- Republican	1789; 1792 (resigned); 1798	Representative-elect died October 20, 1798. New member elected November 29, 1798 and seated with the new Congress. Democratic-Republican hold.	▌ ✓ Joseph H. Nicholson (Democratic-Republican) 51.4%; ▌John Goldsborough (Federalist) 48.6%

=== 6th Congress ===
District	Incumbent			Results	Candidates
District	Representative	Party	First elected	Results	Candidates
New York 1	Jonathan Havens	Democratic- Republican	1794	Incumbent died October 25, 1799. New member elected December 27, 1799 and seated February 27, 1800. Democratic-Republican hold.	▌ ✓ John Smith (Democratic-Republican) 56.20%; ▌Silas Wood (Federalist) 38.59%; ▌Gozen Ryerss (Federalist) 5.20%

== Connecticut ==
District	Incumbent	Party	First elected	Result	Candidates (Note: Only candidates with at least 1% of the vote listed)
Connecticut at-large 7 seats on a general ticket	William Edmond	Federalist	1797 (special)	Incumbent re-elected.	▌ ✓ John Allen (Federalist) 13.4%; ▌ ✓ Chauncey Goodrich (Federalist) 12.5%; ▌ ✓ Samuel W. Dana (Federalist) 12.4%; ▌ ✓ William Edmond (Federalist) 11.8%; ▌ ✓ Roger Griswold (Federalist) 11.5%; ▌ ✓ Jonathan Brace (Federalist) 8.4%; ▌ ✓ John Davenport (Federalist) 7.0%; ▌Elizur Goodrich (Federalist) 4.1%; ▌Timothy Pitkin (Federalist) 3.7%; ▌Benjamin Tallmadge (Federalist) 3.5%; ▌John C. Smith (Federalist) 3.5%; ▌Elias Perkins (Federalist) 3.2%; ▌Calvin Goddard (Federalist) 2.2%; ▌Simeon Baldwin (Federalist) 1.6%
Connecticut at-large 7 seats on a general ticket	Chauncey Goodrich	Federalist	1794	Incumbent re-elected.	
Connecticut at-large 7 seats on a general ticket	Vacant			Incumbent Joshua Coit (F) died September 5, 1798. Federalist hold.	
Connecticut at-large 7 seats on a general ticket	Roger Griswold	Federalist	1794	Incumbent re-elected.	
Connecticut at-large 7 seats on a general ticket	Nathaniel Smith	Federalist	1795 (special)	Incumbent lost re-election. Federalist hold.	
Connecticut at-large 7 seats on a general ticket	John Allen	Federalist	1796	Incumbent re-elected, but declined to serve.	
Connecticut at-large 7 seats on a general ticket	Samuel W. Dana	Federalist	1796	Incumbent re-elected.	

== Delaware ==
District	Incumbent	Party	First elected	Result	Candidates
Delaware at-large	James A. Bayard	Federalist	1796	Incumbent re-elected.	▌ ✓ James A. Bayard (Federalist) 61.2%; ▌Archibald Alexander (Democratic-Republican) 38.8%

== Georgia ==
1798 Georgia at-large election
- October 7-8, 1798

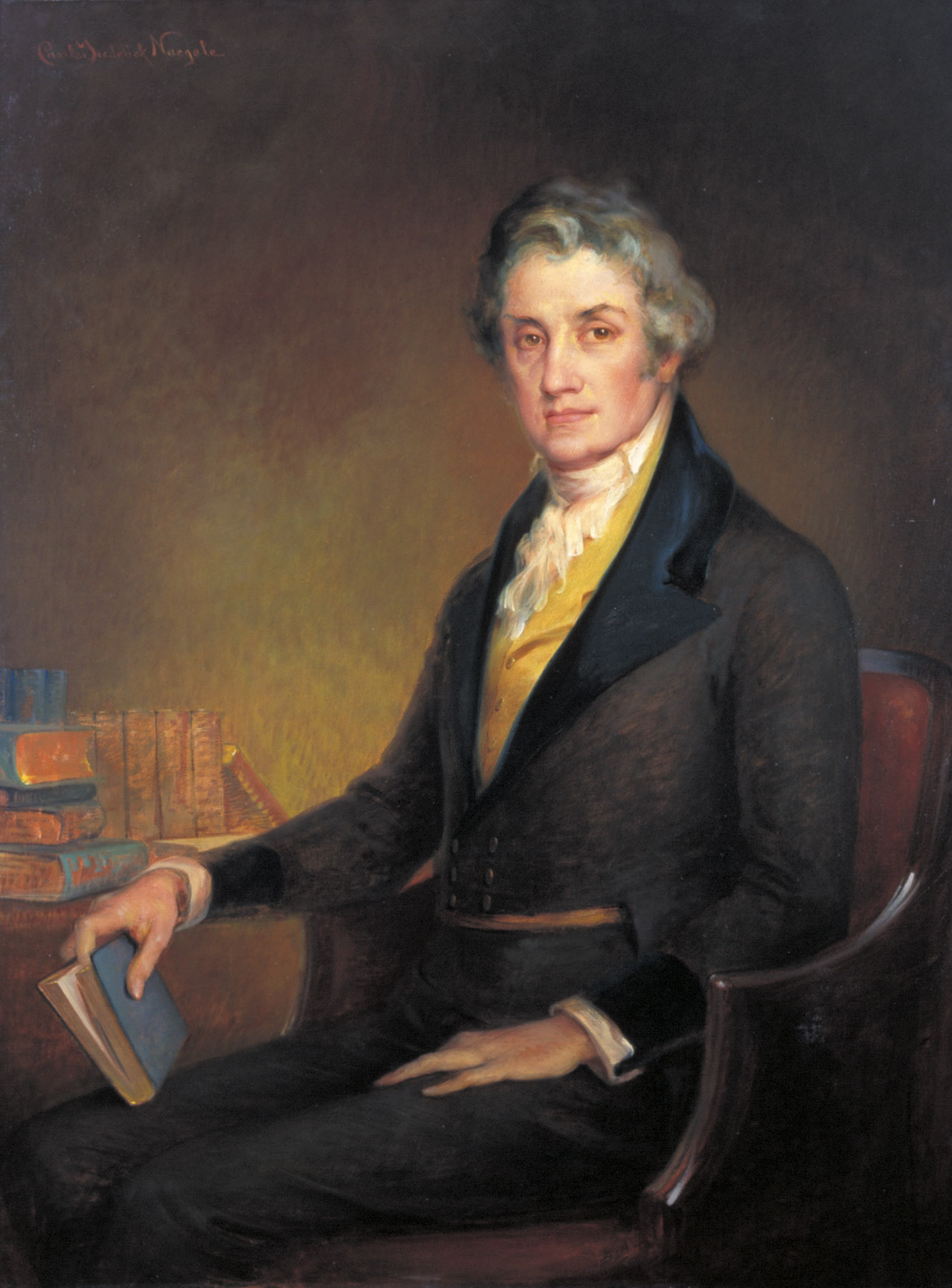
Nominee	James Jones	Benjamin Taliaferro	Abraham Baldwin
Party	Federalist	Federalist	Democratic-Republican
Popular vote	4,264	3,823	3,135
Percentage	37.28%	33.43%	27.41%
- County Results; Jones/Federalist: 30–40% 40–50% 50–60% 60–70% 70–80% 80–90% >90% Taliaferro: 30–40% 40–50% 50–60% Baldwin/Democratic Republican: 40–50% 50–60% Tie: 40–50% 50%
U.S. Representative before election
John Milledge and
Abraham Baldwin
Democratic-Republican
Elected U.S. Representative
James Jones and
Benjamin Taliaferro
Federalist

District	Incumbent	Party	First elected	Result	Candidates
Georgia at-large 2 seats on a general ticket	Abraham Baldwin	Democratic- Republican	1789	Incumbent lost re-election. Federalist gain. Winner died January 11, 1801, and seat remained vacant throughout the next Congress.	▌ ✓ James Jones (Federalist) 36.9%; ▌ ✓ Benjamin Taliaferro (Federalist) 33.4%; ▌Abraham Baldwin (Democratic-Republican) 28.3%; ▌John Milledge (Democratic-Republican) 1.68% (Note: Milledge had declined to run for re-election. As a result, many Democratic-Republican voters cast their votes for Baldwin and one of the Federalists, giving the Federalists enough votes to win both seats. Milledge nevertheless received some votes.)
Georgia at-large 2 seats on a general ticket	John Milledge	Democratic- Republican	1794	Incumbent retired. Federalist gain.	▌ ✓ James Jones (Federalist) 36.9%; ▌ ✓ Benjamin Taliaferro (Federalist) 33.4%; ▌Abraham Baldwin (Democratic-Republican) 28.3%; ▌John Milledge (Democratic-Republican) 1.68%

== Kentucky ==
District	Incumbent	Party	First elected	Result	Candidates
Kentucky 1 "Southern district"	Thomas T. Davis	Democratic- Republican	1797	Incumbent re-elected.	▌ ✓ Thomas T. Davis (Democratic-Republican) 100%
Kentucky 2 "Northern district"	John Fowler	Democratic- Republican	1797	Incumbent re-elected.	▌ ✓ John Fowler (Democratic-Republican) 55.3%; ▌Robert Johnson (Unknown) 25.5%; ▌Philemon Thomas (Democratic-Republican) 19.2%

== Maryland ==
District	Incumbent	Party	First elected	Result	Candidates
Maryland 1	George Dent	Federalist	1792	Incumbent re-elected.	▌ ✓ George Dent (Federalist) 54.5%; ▌John Campbell (Federalist) 45.5%
Maryland 2	Richard Sprigg Jr.	Democratic- Republican	1796 (special)	Incumbent lost re-election. Federalist gain.	▌ ✓ John C. Thomas (Federalist) 61.6%; ▌Richard Sprigg Jr. (Democratic-Republican) 38.4%
Maryland 3	William Craik	Federalist	1796 (special)	Incumbent re-elected.	▌ ✓ William Craik (Federalist) 100%
Maryland 4	George Baer Jr.	Federalist	1796	Incumbent re-elected.	▌ ✓ George Baer Jr. (Federalist) 54.9%; ▌Daniel Hiester (Democratic-Republican) 45.1%
Maryland 5	Samuel Smith	Democratic- Republican	1792	Incumbent re-elected.	▌ ✓ Samuel Smith (Democratic-Republican) 57.7%; ▌James Winchester (Federalist) 42.3%
Maryland 6	William Matthews	Federalist	1796	Incumbent retired. Democratic-Republican gain.	▌ ✓ Gabriel Christie (Democratic-Republican) 56.2%; ▌Philip Thomas (Federalist) 43.8%
Maryland 7	William Hindman	Federalist	1792	Incumbent lost re-election. Democratic-Republican gain. Winner died October 20, 1798, before the new Congress, causing a special election; see above.	▌ ✓ Joshua Seney (Democratic-Republican) 55.6%; ▌William Hindman (Federalist) 44.4%
Maryland 8	John Dennis	Federalist	1796	Incumbent re-elected.	▌ ✓ John Dennis (Federalist) Uncontested

== Massachusetts ==
Massachusetts required a majority for election. This was not met in the 5th district and 7th district necessitating additional ballots in those districts.

District	Incumbent	Party	First elected	Result	Candidates
Massachusetts 1 "1st Western District"	Thomson J. Skinner	Democratic- Republican	1796 (special)	Incumbent retired. Federalist gain.	▌ ✓ Theodore Sedgwick (Federalist) 80.2%; ▌Thomas Ives (Democratic-Republican) 19.8%
Massachusetts 2 "2nd Western District"	William Shepard	Federalist	1797	Incumbent re-elected.	▌ ✓ William Shepard (Federalist) 89.9%; ▌John Williams (Democratic-Republican) 10.1%
Massachusetts 3 "3rd Western District"	Samuel Lyman	Federalist	1794	Incumbent re-elected.	▌ ✓ Samuel Lyman (Federalist) 88.4%; ▌Daniel Bigelow (Unknown) 6.4%; Scattering 5.2%
Massachusetts 4 "4th Western District"	Dwight Foster	Federalist	1793	Incumbent re-elected.	▌ ✓ Dwight Foster (Federalist) 80.8%; ▌Levi Lincoln Sr. (Democratic-Republican) 19.2%
Massachusetts 5 "1st Southern District"	Nathaniel Freeman Jr.	Democratic- Republican	1794	Incumbent retired. Federalist gain.	First ballot (November 5, 1798): ▌ Lemuel Williams (Federalist) 32.5%; ▌ Macajah Coffin (Democratic-Republican) 30.4%; ▌ Beriah Norton (Federalist) 17.4%; ▌Jonathan Moore (Federalist) 13.4%; Scattering 6.3%; Second ballot (January 17, 1799): ▌ Macajah Coffin (Democratic-Republican) 33.5%; ▌ Lemuel Williams (Federalist) 30.1%; ▌ Sam Savage (Unknown) 27.1%; ▌Beriah Norton (Federalist) 9.3%; Third ballot (April 1, 1799): ▌ Lemuel Williams (Federalist) 36.5%; ▌ Sam Savage (Unknown) 33.9%; ▌ Macajah Coffin (Democratic-Republican) 29.5%; Fourth ballot (June 6, 1799): ▌ Lemuel Williams (Federalist) 46.6%; ▌Sam Savage 27.2%; ▌ Macajah Coffin (Democratic-Republican) 26.2%; Fifth ballot (August 29, 1799): ▌ ✓ Lemuel Williams (Federalist) 74.8%; ▌Macajah Coffin (Democratic-Republican) 25.2%
Massachusetts 6 "2nd Southern District"	John Reed Sr.	Federalist	1794	Incumbent re-elected.	▌ ✓ John Reed Sr. (Federalist) 58.0%; ▌John Dwight (Unknown) 26.9%; ▌Daniel Snow (Unknown) 15.1%
Massachusetts 7 "3rd Southern District"	Stephen Bullock	Federalist	1797	Incumbent lost re-election. Democratic-Republican gain.	First ballot (November 5, 1798): ▌ Stephen Bullock (Federalist) 26.9%; ▌ Laban Wheaton (Federalist) 25.7%; ▌ Josiah Dean (Democratic-Republican) 23.6%; ▌ Phanuel Bishop (Democratic-Republican) 11.8%; Scattering 12.1%; Second ballot (January 17, 1799): ▌ Stephen Bullock (Federalist) 33.3%; ▌ Josiah Dean (Democratic-Republican) 25.5%; ▌Laban Wheaton (Federalist) 22.4%; ▌ Phanuel Bishop (Democratic-Republican) 18.9%; Third ballot (April 1, 1799): ▌ Stephen Bullock (Federalist) 48.1%; ▌ Phanuel Bishop (Democratic-Republican) 41.3%; ▌Josiah Dean (Democratic-Republican) 10.6%; Fourth ballot (June 6, 1799): ▌ ✓ Phanuel Bishop (Democratic-Republican) 52.1%; ▌Stephen Bullock (Federalist) 47.9%
Massachusetts 8 "1st Middle District"	Harrison Gray Otis	Federalist	1796	Incumbent re-elected.	▌ ✓ Harrison Gray Otis (Federalist) 55.9%; ▌William Heath (Democratic-Republican) 43.6%; ▌William Eustis (Democratic-Republican) 0.6%
Massachusetts 9 "2nd Middle District"	Joseph Bradley Varnum	Democratic- Republican	1795	Incumbent re-elected.	▌ ✓ Joseph Bradley Varnum (Democratic-Republican) 66.2%; ▌Timothy Bigelow (Federalist) 33.8%
Massachusetts 10 "3rd Middle District"	Samuel Sewall	Federalist	1796	Incumbent re-elected.	▌ ✓ Samuel Sewall (Federalist) 70.3%; ▌Loammi Baldwin (Federalist) 20.5%; Scattering 9.2%
Massachusetts 11 "4th Middle District"	Bailey Bartlett	Federalist	1797 (special)	Incumbent re-elected.	▌ ✓ Bailey Bartlett (Federalist) 100%
Massachusetts 12 District of Maine "1st Eastern District"	Isaac Parker	Federalist	1797	Incumbent retired. Federalist hold.	▌ ✓ Silas Lee (Federalist) 64.4%; ▌Henry Dearborn (Democratic-Republican) 35.6%
Massachusetts 13 District of Maine "2nd Eastern District"	Peleg Wadsworth	Federalist	1793	Incumbent re-elected.	▌ ✓ Peleg Wadsworth (Federalist) 73.5%; ▌Charles Tainer (Unknown) 26.5%
Massachusetts 14 District of Maine "3rd Eastern District"	George Thatcher	Federalist	1788	Incumbent re-elected.	▌ ✓ George Thatcher (Federalist) 65.5%; ▌John Fairchild (Democratic-Republican) 34.5%

== New Hampshire ==
District	Incumbent	Party	First elected	Result	Candidates
New Hampshire at-large 4 seats on a general ticket	Abiel Foster	Federalist	1794	Incumbent re-elected.	▌ ✓ Abiel Foster (Federalist) 24.2%; ▌ ✓ William Gordon (Federalist) 21.6%; ▌ ✓ Jonathan Freeman (Federalist) 21.0%; ▌ ✓ Peleg Sprague (Federalist) 19.5%; ▌Thomas Bellows (Federalist) 1.9%; ▌John Prentice (Federalist) 1.8%; ▌Timothy Walker (Federalist) 1.0%; Others: ▌William Plummer (Federalist) 0.8%; ▌Joseph Dennie (Federalist) 0.7%; ▌Woodbury Langdon (Democratic-Republican) 0.7%; ▌John Goddard (Democratic-Republican) 0.6%; ▌Oliver Peabody (Federalist) 0.6%; ▌William Gardner (Democratic-Republican) 0.5%; Others 5.1%
New Hampshire at-large 4 seats on a general ticket	William Gordon	Federalist	1796	Incumbent re-elected.	
New Hampshire at-large 4 seats on a general ticket	Jonathan Freeman	Federalist	1796	Incumbent re-elected.	
New Hampshire at-large 4 seats on a general ticket	Peleg Sprague	Federalist	1797 (special)	Incumbent re-elected, but declined to serve. A special election was held.	

== New Jersey ==
New Jersey switched to district representation for this election. The districts were not numbered at the time, but are retroactively numbered here as 1–5. New Jersey would go back to an at-large district the following election.

District	Incumbent	Party	First elected	Result	Candidates
New Jersey 1 "Eastern district"	James Schureman; Redistricted from the at-large district	Federalist	1797	Incumbent lost re-election. Democratic-Republican gain.	▌ ✓ John Condit (Democratic-Republican) 52.5%; ▌James Schureman (Federalist) 47.5%
New Jersey 2 "Northern district"	Mark Thomson; Redistricted from the at-large district	Federalist	1794	Incumbent lost re-election. Democratic-Republican gain.	▌ ✓ Aaron Kitchell (Democratic-Republican) 72.5%; ▌Mark Thomson (Federalist) 27.5%
New Jersey 3 "Western district"	Jonathan Dayton; Redistricted from the at-large district	Federalist	1791	Incumbent retired to run for U.S. Senator. Democratic-Republican gain.	▌ ✓ James Linn (Democratic-Republican) 51.3%; ▌Samuel R. Stewart (Federalist) 31.1%; ▌Archibald Mercer (Federalist) 17.6%
New Jersey 4 "Middle district"	James H. Imlay; Redistricted from the at-large district	Federalist	1797	Incumbent re-elected.	▌ ✓ James H. Imlay (Federalist) 81.0%; ▌Thomas Henderson (Democratic-Republican) 19.0%
New Jersey 5 "Southern district"	Thomas Sinnickson; Redistricted from the at-large district	Federalist	1797	Unknown if incumbent lost re-election or retired. Federalist hold.	▌ ✓ Franklin Davenport (Federalist) 56.5%; ▌Jonathan Elmer (Democratic-Republican) 43.5%

== New York ==
Between the 1796 and 1798 elections, New York re-districted. This marked the first time that its districts were numbered.

District	Incumbent	Party	First elected	Result	Candidates
New York 1	Jonathan N. Havens	Democratic- Republican	1794	Incumbent re-elected.	▌ ✓ Jonathan N. Havens (Democratic-Republican) 53.9%; ▌Richard Thorn (Federalist) 46.1%
New York 2	Edward Livingston	Democratic- Republican	1794	Incumbent re-elected.	▌ ✓ Edward Livingston (Democratic-Republican) 52.7%; ▌Phillip Livingston (Federalist) 47.3%
New York 3	Philip Van Cortlandt	Democratic- Republican	1793	Incumbent re-elected.	▌ ✓ Philip Van Cortlandt (Democratic-Republican) 77.1%; ▌Mordecai Hale (Federalist) 22.9%
New York 4	Lucas Elmendorf	Democratic- Republican	1796	Incumbent re-elected.	▌ ✓ Lucas Elmendorf (Democratic-Republican) 64.8%; ▌Jonathan Hasbrouck (Federalist) 34.1%; ▌John Hathorn (Democratic-Republican) 1.1%
New York 5	David Brooks	Federalist	1796	Incumbent lost re-election. Democratic-Republican gain.	▌ ✓ Theodorus Bailey (Democratic-Republican) 55.8%; ▌David Brooks (Federalist) 44.2%
New York 6	Hezekiah L. Hosmer	Federalist	1796	Incumbent retired. Federalist hold.	▌ ✓ John Bird (Federalist) 59.1%; ▌Elisha Jenkins (Democratic-Republican) 40.9%
New York 7	John E. Van Alen	Federalist	1793	Incumbent retired. Democratic-Republican gain.	▌ ✓ John Thompson (Democratic-Republican) 52.5%; ▌John Williams (Federalist) 37.5%; ▌Jellis A. Fonda (Federalist) 10.0%
New York 7	John Williams; Redistricted from the 9th district	Federalist	1796	Incumbent lost re-election. Federalist loss.	▌ ✓ John Thompson (Democratic-Republican) 52.5%; ▌John Williams (Federalist) 37.5%; ▌Jellis A. Fonda (Federalist) 10.0%
New York 8	Henry Glen	Federalist	1793	Incumbent re-elected.	▌ ✓ Henry Glen (Federalist) 100%
New York 9	None (District created)			New seat. Federalist gain.	▌ ✓ Jonas Platt (Federalist) 51.2%; ▌Peter Smith (Democratic-Republican) 48.8%
New York 10	James Cochran	Federalist	1796	Incumbent retired. Federalist hold.	▌ ✓ William Cooper (Federalist) 52.2%; ▌Moss Kent (Democratic-Republican) 47.8%

== North Carolina ==
District	Incumbent	Party	First elected	Result	Candidates
North Carolina 1	Joseph McDowell	Democratic- Republican	1796	Incumbent lost re-election. Federalist gain.	▌ ✓ Joseph Dickson (Federalist) 55.1%; ▌James Holland (Democratic-Republican) 44.8%
North Carolina 2	Matthew Locke	Democratic- Republican	1793	Incumbent lost re-election. Federalist gain.	▌ ✓ Archibald Henderson (Federalist) 84.4%; ▌Basil Gaither (Federalist) 9.5%; ▌Matthew Locke (Democratic-Republican) 6.1%
North Carolina 3	Robert Williams	Democratic- Republican	1796	Incumbent re-elected.	▌ ✓ Robert Williams (Democratic-Republican) 69.8%; ▌James Martin (Federalist) 30.2%
North Carolina 4	Richard Stanford	Democratic- Republican	1796	Incumbent re-elected.	▌ ✓ Richard Stanford (Democratic-Republican) 54.5%; ▌Samuel Benton (Federalist) 45.5%
North Carolina 5	Nathaniel Macon	Democratic- Republican	1791	Incumbent re-elected.	▌ ✓ Nathaniel Macon (Democratic-Republican) 100%
North Carolina 6	James Gillespie	Democratic- Republican	1793	Incumbent lost re-election. Federalist gain.	▌ ✓ William H. Hill (Federalist) 50.1%; ▌James Gillespie (Democratic-Republican) 39.8%; ▌Alexander D. Moore (Federalist) 10.1%
North Carolina 7	William B. Grove	Federalist	1791	Incumbent re-elected.	▌ ✓ William B. Grove (Federalist) 100%
North Carolina 8	Dempsey Burgess	Democratic- Republican	1795	Incumbent lost re-election. Democratic-Republican hold.	▌ ✓ David Stone (Democratic-Republican) 40.0%; ▌Charles Johnson (Federalist) 30.9%; ▌Dempsey Burgess (Democratic-Republican) 29.1%
North Carolina 9	Thomas Blount	Democratic- Republican	1793	Incumbent lost re-election. Democratic-Republican hold.	▌ ✓ Willis Alston (Democratic-Republican) 37.4%; ▌Thomas Blount (Democratic-Republican) 29.1%; ▌William Kennedy (Federalist) 24.6%; ▌John Binford (Federalist) 8.9%
North Carolina 10	Vacant			Incumbent Nathan Bryan (D-R) died June 4, 1798. Democratic-Republican hold. Winner was also elected to finish the current term; see above.	▌ ✓ Richard D. Spaight (Democratic-Republican) 66.7%; ▌George E. Badger (Federalist) 32.3%

== Northwest Territory ==
See Non-voting delegates, below.

== Pennsylvania ==
District	Incumbent	Party	First elected	Result	Candidates
Pennsylvania 1	Vacant			Incumbent John Swanwick (Democratic-Republican) died August 1, 1798. Federalist gain. Winner was also elected to finish the current term; see above.	▌ ✓ Robert Waln (Federalist) 69.5%; ▌Samuel Miles (Democratic-Republican) 30.5%
Pennsylvania 2	Blair McClenachan	Democratic- Republican	1796	Incumbent retired. Democratic-Republican hold.	▌ ✓ Michael Leib (Democratic-Republican) 56.5%; ▌Anthony Morris (Federalist) 43.5%
Pennsylvania 3	Richard Thomas	Federalist	1794	Incumbent re-elected.	▌ ✓ Richard Thomas (Federalist) 71.3%; ▌John Pearson (Democratic-Republican) 28.7%
Pennsylvania 4 Plural district with 2 seats	Vacant			Incumbent Samuel Sitgreaves (F) resigned August 29, 1798. Democratic-Republican gain.	▌ ✓ Robert Brown (Democratic-Republican) 31.1%; ▌ ✓ Peter Muhlenberg (Democratic-Republican) 28.6%; ▌John Chapman (Federalist) 20.9%; ▌Jacob Eyerly (Federalist) 19.0%; ▌Anthony Morris (Federalist) 0.5%
Pennsylvania 4 Plural district with 2 seats	John Chapman	Federalist	1796	Incumbent lost re-election. Democratic-Republican gain.	▌ ✓ Robert Brown (Democratic-Republican) 31.1%; ▌ ✓ Peter Muhlenberg (Democratic-Republican) 28.6%; ▌John Chapman (Federalist) 20.9%; ▌Jacob Eyerly (Federalist) 19.0%; ▌Anthony Morris (Federalist) 0.5%
Pennsylvania 5	Vacant			Incumbent George Ege (F) resigned in October 1797. New member elected October 10, 1797 and seated December 1, 1797. Democratic-Republican gain. Winner was also elected to finish the current term; see above.	▌ ✓ Joseph Hiester (Democratic-Republican) 69.3%; ▌Daniel Clymer (Federalist) 30.7%
Pennsylvania 6	John A. Hanna	Democratic- Republican	1796	Incumbent re-elected.	▌ ✓ John A. Hanna (Democratic-Republican) 66.3%; ▌Daniel Smith (Federalist) 33.7%
Pennsylvania 7	John W. Kittera	Federalist	1791	Incumbent re-elected.	▌ ✓ John W. Kittera (Federalist) 77.5%; ▌William Barton (Democratic-Republican) 22.5%
Pennsylvania 8	Thomas Hartley	Federalist	1788	Incumbent re-elected.	▌ ✓ Thomas Hartley (Federalist) 85.4%; ▌Henry Slagle (Federalist) 14.6%
Pennsylvania 9	Andrew Gregg	Democratic- Republican	1791	Incumbent re-elected.	▌ ✓ Andrew Gregg (Democratic-Republican) 57.8%; ▌James Armstrong (Federalist) 42.2%
Pennsylvania 10	David Bard	Democratic- Republican	1794	Incumbent lost re-election. Federalist gain.	▌ ✓ Henry Woods (Federalist) 55.4%; ▌Thomas Johnson (Federalist) 24.3%; ▌David Bard (Democratic-Republican) 20.3%
Pennsylvania 11	William Findley	Democratic- Republican	1791	Incumbent retired. Democratic-Republican hold.	▌ ✓ John Smilie (Democratic-Republican) 46.0%; ▌William Todd (Federalist) 32.7%; ▌James Guthrie (Federalist) 21.3%
Pennsylvania 12	Albert Gallatin	Democratic- Republican	1794	Incumbent re-elected.	▌ ✓ Albert Gallatin (Democratic-Republican) 58.8%; ▌John Woods (Federalist) 41.2%

== Rhode Island ==
Rhode Island used at-large districts, but elected the candidates on separate tickets instead of using a general ticket.

District	Incumbent	Party	First elected	Result	Candidates
Rhode Island at-large (Seat A)	Thomas Tillinghast	Federalist	1797 (special)	Incumbent lost re-election. Federalist hold.	▌ ✓ John Brown (Federalist) 65.4%; ▌Thomas Tillinghast (Federalist) 34.6%
Rhode Island at-large (Seat B)	Christopher G. Champlin	Federalist	1796	Incumbent re-elected.	▌ ✓ Christopher G. Champlin (Federalist) 97.5%; Others 2.5%

== South Carolina ==
District	Incumbent	Party	First elected	Result	Candidates
South Carolina 1 "Charleston district"	Thomas Pinckney	Federalist	1797 (special)	Incumbent re-elected.	▌ ✓ Thomas Pinckney (Federalist) 100%
South Carolina 2 "Beaufort district"	John Rutledge Jr.	Federalist	1796	Incumbent re-elected.	▌ ✓ John Rutledge Jr. (Federalist) 65.6%; ▌Pierce Butler (Democratic-Republican) 34.4%
South Carolina 3 "Georgetown district"	Lemuel Benton	Democratic- Republican	1793	Incumbent lost re-election. Federalist gain.	▌ ✓ Benjamin Huger (Federalist) 41.9%; ▌Lemuel Benton (Democratic-Republican) 32.4%; ▌Tristam Thomas (Federalist) 22.2%; ▌William Thomas (Democratic-Republican) 2.0%; ▌Joseph Blyth (Democratic-Republican) 1.6%
South Carolina 4 "Camden district"	Thomas Sumter	Democratic- Republican	1796	Incumbent re-elected.	▌ ✓ Thomas Sumter (Democratic-Republican) 64.6%; ▌Richard Winn (Federalist) 35.4%
South Carolina 5 "Ninety-Six district"	Robert Goodloe Harper	Federalist	1794	Incumbent re-elected.	▌ ✓ Robert Goodloe Harper (Federalist) 65.3%; ▌William Butler (Democratic-Republican) 34.7%
South Carolina 6 "Washington district"	William Smith	Democratic- Republican	1796	Incumbent lost re-election. Federalist gain.	▌ ✓ Abraham Nott (Federalist) 43.8%; ▌William Smith (Democratic-Republican) 43.2%; ▌William Hill (Federalist) 13.0%

== Tennessee ==
District	Incumbent	Party	First elected	Result	Candidates
Tennessee at-large	William C. C. Claiborne	Democratic- Republican	1797	Incumbent re-elected.	▌ ✓ William C. C. Claiborne (Democratic-Republican); Uncontested

== Vermont ==
Majority vote required to win, necessitating a run-off election in the 1st (Western) district.

District	Incumbent	Party	First elected	Result	Candidates
Vermont 1 "Western district"	Matthew Lyon	Democratic- Republican	1797	Incumbent re-elected.	First ballot (September 4, 1798): ▌Matthew Lyon (Democratic-Republican) 49.7%; ▌Samuel Williams (Federalist) 22.0%; ▌Daniel Chipman (Federalist) 19.5%; ▌Abel Spencer (Federalist) 3.8%; ▌ Israel Smith (Democratic-Republican) 3.4%; Others 1.6%; Second ballot (December 4, 1798): ▌ ✓ Matthew Lyon (Democratic-Republican) 55.5%; ▌Samuel Williams (Federalist) 37.9%; ▌Israel Smith (Democratic-Republican) 6.6%
Vermont 2 "Eastern district"	Lewis R. Morris	Federalist	1797 (special)	Incumbent re-elected.	▌ ✓ Lewis R. Morris (Federalist) 86.5%; ▌Nathaniel Niles (Democratic-Republican) 6.7%; ▌William Chamberlain (Federalist) 2.5%; Others: ▌Stephen Jacobs (Unknown) 1.9%; ▌Stephen R. Bradley (Democratic-Republican) 1.1%; Others 1.2%

== Virginia ==
District	Incumbent	Party	First elected	Result	Candidates
Virginia 1	Daniel Morgan	Federalist	1797	Incumbent retired. Federalist hold.	▌ ✓ Robert Page (Federalist) 54.3%; ▌John Smith (Democratic-Republican) 45.7%
Virginia 2	David Holmes	Democratic- Republican	1797	Incumbent re-elected.	▌ ✓ David Holmes (Democratic-Republican) (Note: Source does not give numbers of votes or has incomplete data); ▌Robert Porterfield (Federalist)
Virginia 3	James Machir	Federalist	1797	Incumbent retired. Democratic-Republican gain.	▌ ✓ George Jackson (Democratic-Republican) 53.9%; ▌John Haymond (Federalist) 46.0%
Virginia 4	Abram Trigg	Democratic- Republican	1797	Incumbent re-elected.	▌ ✓ Abram Trigg (Democratic-Republican) 88.5%; ▌William Preston (Federalist) 11.5%
Virginia 5	John J. Trigg	Democratic- Republican	1797	Incumbent re-elected.	▌ ✓ John J. Trigg (Democratic-Republican); ▌George Hancock (Federalist)
Virginia 6	Matthew Clay	Democratic- Republican	1797	Incumbent re-elected.	▌ ✓ Matthew Clay (Democratic-Republican); ▌Isaac Coles (Democratic-Republican)
Virginia 7	Abraham B. Venable	Democratic- Republican	1790	Incumbent retired. Democratic-Republican hold.	▌ ✓ John Randolph (Democratic-Republican) 40.5%; ▌Powhatan Bolling (Democratic-Republican) 40.3%; ▌Clement Carrington (Federalist) 19.2%
Virginia 8	Thomas Claiborne	Democratic- Republican	1793	Incumbent lost re-election. Democratic-Republican hold.	▌ ✓ Samuel Goode (Democratic-Republican) 52.5%; ▌Thomas Claiborne (Democratic-Republican) 47.5%
Virginia 9	Joseph Eggleston	Democratic- Republican	1798 (special)	Incumbent re-elected.	▌ ✓ Joseph Eggleston (Democratic-Republican) 63.4%; ▌Alexander McRae (Federalist) 36.6%
Virginia 10	Carter B. Harrison	Democratic- Republican	1793	Incumbent retired. Democratic-Republican hold.	▌ ✓ Edwin Gray (Democratic-Republican); ▌John Mason Jr. (Democratic-Republican); ▌Robert Booth (Democratic-Republican); ▌Benjamin Harrison (Democratic-Republican); ▌Wood Heath (Federalist)
Virginia 11	Josiah Parker	Federalist	1789	Incumbent re-elected.	▌ ✓ Josiah Parker (Federalist) 56.2%; ▌Thomas Newton Jr. (Democratic-Republican) 43.8%
Virginia 12	Thomas Evans	Federalist	1797	Incumbent re-elected.	▌ ✓ Thomas Evans (Federalist) 62.3%; ▌John Page (Democratic-Republican) 37.7%
Virginia 13	John Clopton	Democratic- Republican	1795	Incumbent lost re-election. Federalist gain.	▌ ✓ John Marshall (Federalist); ▌John Clopton (Democratic-Republican)
Virginia 14	Samuel J. Cabell	Democratic- Republican	1795	Incumbent re-elected.	▌ ✓ Samuel J. Cabell (Democratic-Republican) 86.0%; ▌John Nicholas (Democratic-Republican) 14.0%
Virginia 15	John Dawson	Democratic- Republican	1797	Incumbent re-elected.	▌ ✓ John Dawson (Democratic-Republican) 100%
Virginia 16	Anthony New	Democratic- Republican	1793	Incumbent re-elected.	▌ ✓ Anthony New (Democratic-Republican); ▌Benjamin Temple (Federalist)
Virginia 17	Richard Brent	Democratic- Republican	1795	Incumbent retired. Federalist gain.	▌ ✓ Leven Powell (Federalist) 63.8%; ▌Roger West (Democratic-Republican) 36.4%
Virginia 18	John Nicholas	Democratic- Republican	1793	Incumbent re-elected.	▌ ✓ John Nicholas (Democratic-Republican); ▌John Blackwell (Federalist)
Virginia 19	Walter Jones	Democratic- Republican	1797	Incumbent lost re-election. Federalist gain.	▌ ✓ Henry Lee (Federalist) 51.4%; ▌Walter Jones (Democratic-Republican) 48.6%

== Non-voting delegates ==
District	Incumbent			This race	
District	Delegate	Party	First elected	Results	Candidates
Northwest Territory at-large	New seat			New seat created. New delegate elected October 3, 1799. New delegate had no known party.	▌ ✓ William Henry Harrison (Party affiliation unclear) 11; ▌Arthur St. Clair Jr. (Federalist) 10

== See also ==
- 1798 United States elections
  - List of United States House of Representatives elections (1789–1822)
  - 1798–99 United States Senate elections
- 5th United States Congress
- 6th United States Congress

== Bibliography ==
- "A New Nation Votes: American Election Returns 1787-1825". Tufts Digital Library, Tufts University. Archived from the original on January 29, 2015.
- Dubin, Michael J. (March 1, 1998). United States Congressional Elections, 1788-1997: The Official Results of the Elections of the 1st Through 105th Congresses. McFarland and Company. ISBN 978-0786402830.
- Martis, Kenneth C. (January 1, 1989). The Historical Atlas of Political Parties in the United States Congress, 1789-1989. Macmillan Publishing Company. ISBN 978-0029201701.
- "Party Divisions of the House of Representatives* 1789–Present". Office of the Historian, United States House of Representatives.
- Mapping Early American Elections project team (2019). "Mapping Early American Elections". Roy Rosenzweig Center for History and New Media, George Mason University.
