= 5th United States Congress =

1797-1799 legislative term

←	4th	6th	→
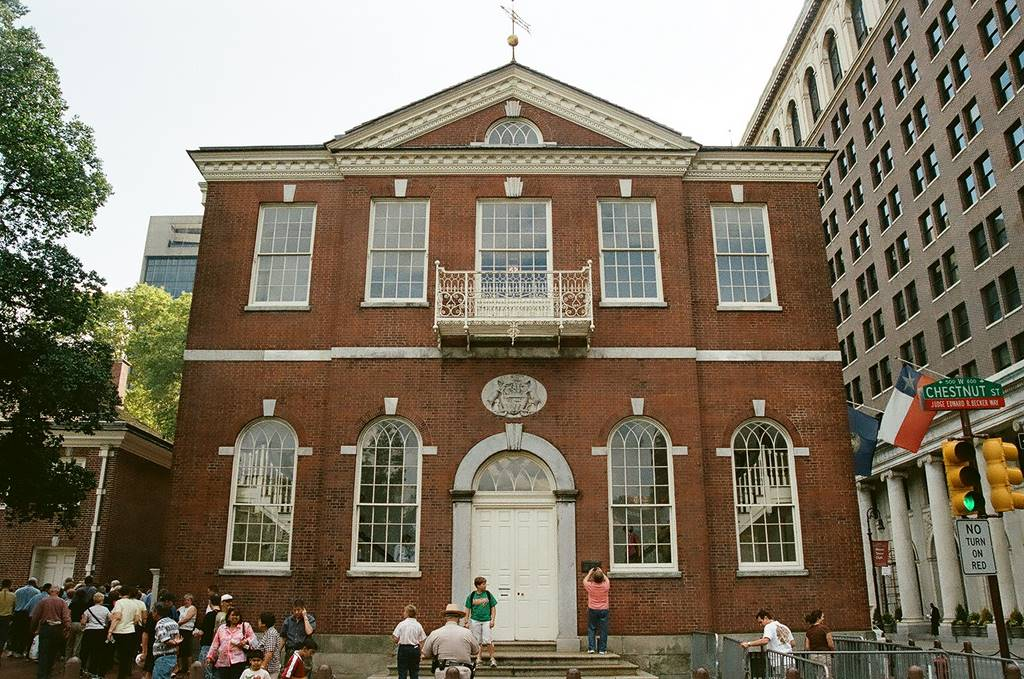
- Congress Hall (2007)

Overview
- Legislative body: United States Congress
- Jurisdiction: United States
- Term: March 4, 1797 – March 3, 1799

Senate
- Members: 32
- President: Thomas Jefferson (DR)
- President pro tempore: William Bradford (F); Jacob Read (F); Theodore Sedgwick (F); John Laurance (F); James Ross (F)
- Party control: Federalist

House of Representatives
- Members: 106
- Speaker: Jonathan Dayton (F)
- Party control: Federalist

Sessions
- Special (Note: Special session of the Senate.): March 4, 1797 – March 4, 1797
- 1st: May 15, 1797 – July 10, 1797
- 2nd: November 13, 1797 – July 16, 1798
- Special (Note: Special session of the Senate.): July 17, 1798 – July 19, 1798
- 3rd: December 3, 1798 – March 3, 1799

The 5th United States Congress was a meeting of the legislative branch of the United States federal government, consisting of the United States Senate and the United States House of Representatives. It met at Congress Hall in Philadelphia, Pennsylvania, from March 4, 1797, to March 4, 1799, during the first two years of John Adams' presidency. In the context of the Quasi-War with France, the Alien and Sedition Acts were passed by Congress. The Acts were overwhelmingly supported by the Federalists and mostly opposed by the Democratic-Republicans. Some Democratic-Republicans, such as Timothy Bloodworth, said they would support formally going to war against France but they opposed the Alien and Sedition Acts which Bloodworth and others believed were unconstitutional.

The apportionment of seats in this House of Representatives was based on the 1790 United States census. Both chambers had a Federalist majority.

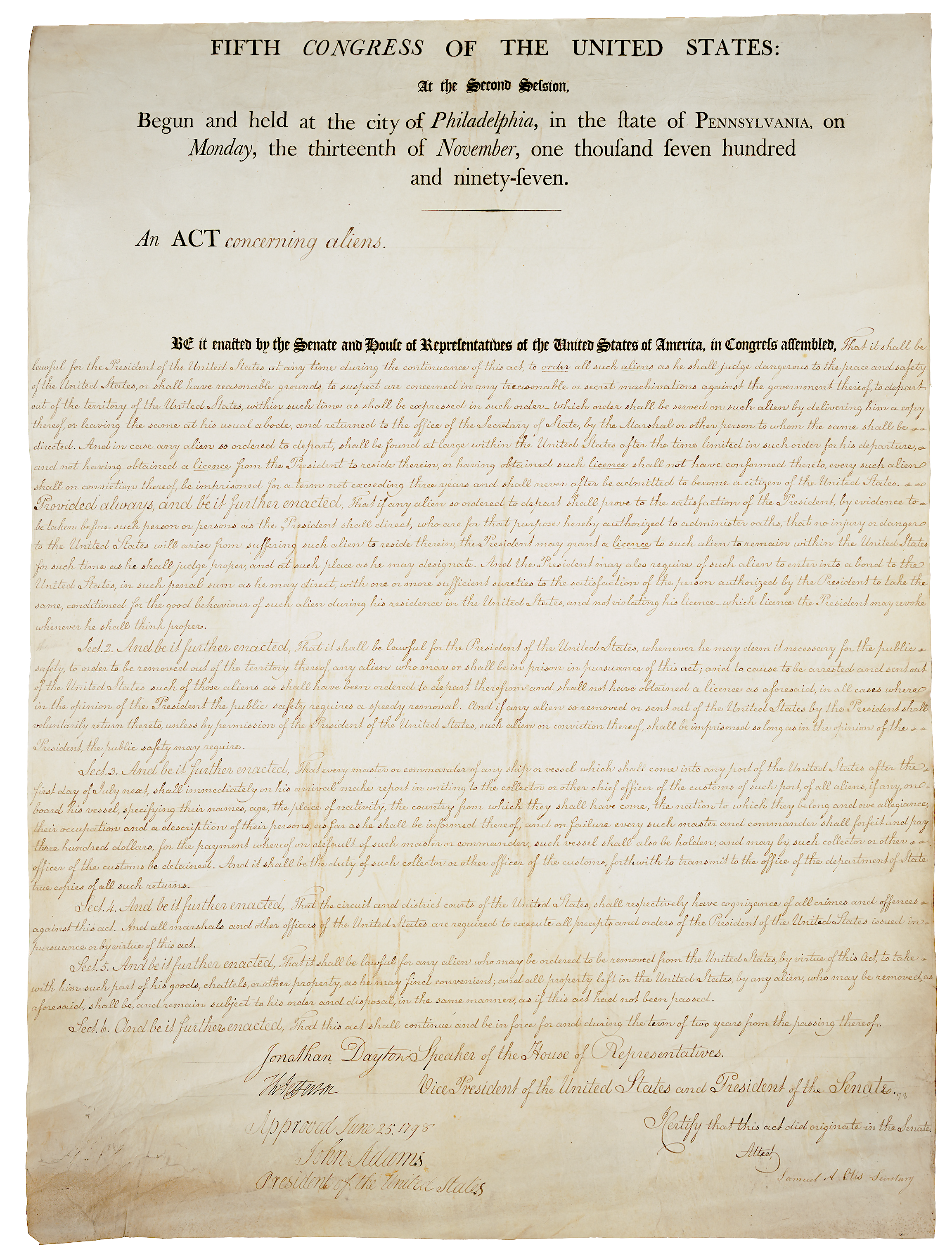
One of the Alien and Sedition Acts

== Major events ==
- March 4, 1797 – John Adams became President of the United States
- July 8, 1797 – The Senate expelled Tennessee Senator William Blount for conspiring with the British
- July 11, 1798 – The United States Marine Corps was established
- XYZ Affair in the U.S., followed by naval skirmishes but no war is declared. The XYZ affair led to several Democratic-Republicans breaking ranks with Thomas Jefferson. Jefferson took pains to avoid blaming France for the incident, as a result John Hunter, Josiah Tattnall, Timothy Bloodworth, Alexander Martin, Lemuel Benton, Thomas Sumter, William Smith, John Milledge, Abraham Baldwin, Joseph McDowell, Matthew Locke, Robert Williams, Richard Stanford, Nathaniel Macon, James Gillespie, Dempsey Burges, Thomas Blount, Nathan Bryan, John Brown, Thomas T. Davis, John Fowler and Joseph Anderson all publicly broke ranks with Jefferson, despite the fact he was the de facto leader of their party, and sided with Alexander Hamilton. The aforementioned congressmen and senators were referred to by Jefferson as a "reign of witches" and were described as the "Pro-British republicans" (as opposed to the "pro-French republicans" led by Jefferson).

== Major legislation ==
- April 7, 1798: Mississippi Organic Act ("An Act for an amicable settlement of limits with the state of Georgia, and authorizing the establishment of a government in the Mississippi territory"), Sess. 2, ch. 28, 1 Stat. 549
- April 30, 1798: The U.S. Department of the Navy was established, Sess. 2, ch. 35, 1 Stat. 553
- June 18, 1798: Alien and Sedition Acts: ("An Act to establish a uniform rule of naturalization") (Naturalization Act of 1798), Sess. 2, ch. 54, 1 Stat. 566
- June 25, 1798: Alien and Sedition Acts: ("An Act concerning Aliens"), Sess. 2, ch. 58, 1 Stat. 570
- July 6, 1798: Alien and Sedition Acts: ("An Act respecting Alien Enemies"), Sess. 2, ch. 66, 1 Stat. 577
- July 9, 1798: Act Further to Protect the Commerce of the United States, Sess. 2, ch. 68, 1 Stat. 578
- July 11, 1798: The United States Marine Corps was established, Sess. 2, ch. 72, 1 Stat. 594
- July 14, 1798: Alien and Sedition Acts: ("An Act for the punishment of certain crimes against the United States") (Sedition Act), Sess. 2, ch. 74, 1 Stat. 596
- July 16, 1798: Marine Hospital Service Act ("An Act for the relief of sick and disabled Seamen"), Sess. 2, ch. 77, 1 Stat. 605

== Treaties ratified ==
- June 7, 1797: Treaty of Tripoli between the United States and Tripoli.
- July 7, 1797: Existing treaties with France were rescinded, Sess. 2, ch. 67, 1 Stat. 578

== Party summary ==
Details on changes are shown below in the "Changes in membership" section.

=== Senate ===
	Party (shading shows control)		Total	Vacant
	Democratic- Republican (DR)	Federalist (F)	Total	Vacant
End of previous congress	11	21	32	0
Begin	9	22	31	1
End	9	22	31	1
Final voting share	29.0%	71.0%		
Beginning of next congress	9	22	31	1

=== House of Representatives ===

	Party (shading shows control)		Total	Vacant
	Democratic- Republican (DR)	Federalist (F)	Total	Vacant
End of previous congress	59	47	106	0
Begin	49	56	105	1
End	50	56	106	0
Final voting share	47.2%	52.8%		
Beginning of next congress	46	60	106	0

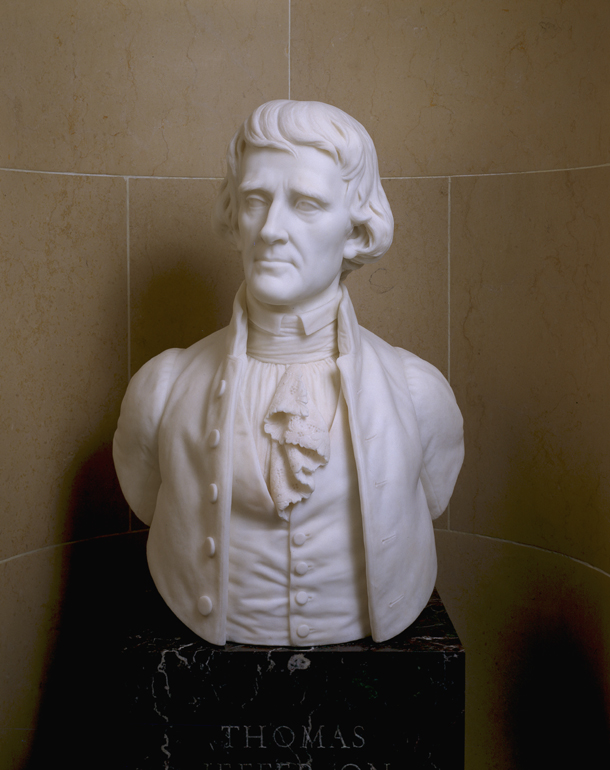
President of the Senate Thomas Jefferson

== Leadership ==
=== Senate ===
- President: Thomas Jefferson (DR)
- President pro tempore: William Bingham (F), carried over from 5th Congress until July 6, 1797
  - William Bradford (F), elected July 6, 1797
  - Jacob Read (F), elected November 22, 1797
  - Theodore Sedgwick (F), elected June 27, 1798
  - John Laurance (F), elected December 6, 1798
  - James Ross (F), elected March 1, 1799

=== House of Representatives ===
- Speaker: Jonathan Dayton (F)

== Members ==
This list is arranged by chamber, then by state. Senators are listed in order of seniority, and representatives are listed by district.

=== Senate ===
Senators were elected by the state legislatures every two years, with one-third beginning new six-year terms with each Congress. Preceding the names in the list below are Senate class numbers, which indicate the cycle of their election. In this Congress, Class 1 meant their term began in this Congress, requiring reelection in 1802; Class 2 meant their term ended with this Congress, requiring reelection in 1798; and Class 3 meant their term began in the last Congress, requiring reelection in 1800.

Skip to House of Representatives, below

==== Connecticut ====
▌1. James Hillhouse (F)
▌3. Uriah Tracy (F)

==== Delaware ====
▌1. Henry Latimer (F)
▌2. John Vining (F), until January 19, 1798

▌Joshua Clayton (F), from January 19, 1798, until August 11, 1798
▌William H. Wells (F), from January 17, 1799

==== Georgia ====
▌2. Josiah Tattnall (DR)
▌3. James Gunn (F)

==== Kentucky ====
▌2. John Brown (DR)
▌3. Humphrey Marshall (F)

==== Maryland ====
▌1. John Eager Howard (F)
▌3. John Henry (F), until December 10, 1797

▌James Lloyd (F), from December 11, 1797

==== Massachusetts ====
▌1. Benjamin Goodhue (F)
▌2. Theodore Sedgwick (F)

==== New Hampshire ====
▌2. Samuel Livermore (F)
▌3. John Langdon (DR)

==== New Jersey ====
▌1. John Rutherfurd (F), until November 26, 1798

▌Franklin Davenport (F), from December 5, 1798

▌2. Richard Stockton (F)

==== New York ====
▌1. Philip Schuyler (F), until January 3, 1798

▌John Sloss Hobart (F), from January 11, 1798, until April 16, 1798
▌William North (F), from May 5, 1798, until August 17, 1798
▌James Watson (F), from August 17, 1798

▌3. John Laurance (F)

==== North Carolina ====
▌2. Alexander Martin (DR)
▌3. Timothy Bloodworth (DR)

==== Pennsylvania ====
▌1. James Ross (F)
▌3. William Bingham (F)

==== Rhode Island ====
▌1. Theodore Foster (F)
▌2. William Bradford (F), until October 20, 1797

▌Ray Greene (F), from November 13, 1797

==== South Carolina ====
▌2. John Hunter (DR) until November 26, 1798

▌Charles Pinckney (DR), from December 6, 1798

▌3. Jacob Read (F)

==== Tennessee ====
▌1. William Cocke (DR), May 15, 1797 - September 26, 1797

▌Andrew Jackson (DR), September 26, 1797 - April 12, 1798
▌Daniel Smith (DR), from October 6, 1798

▌2. William Blount (DR), until July 8, 1797

▌Joseph Anderson (DR), from September 26, 1797

==== Vermont ====
▌1. Isaac Tichenor (F), until October 17, 1797

▌Nathaniel Chipman (F), from October 17, 1797

▌3. Elijah Paine (F)

==== Virginia ====
▌1. Stevens Mason (DR)
▌2. Henry Tazewell (DR), until January 24, 1799

Senators' party membership by state at the opening of the 5th Congress in March 1797. 2 Democratic-Republicans 1 Democratic-Republican and 1 Federalist 2 Federalists

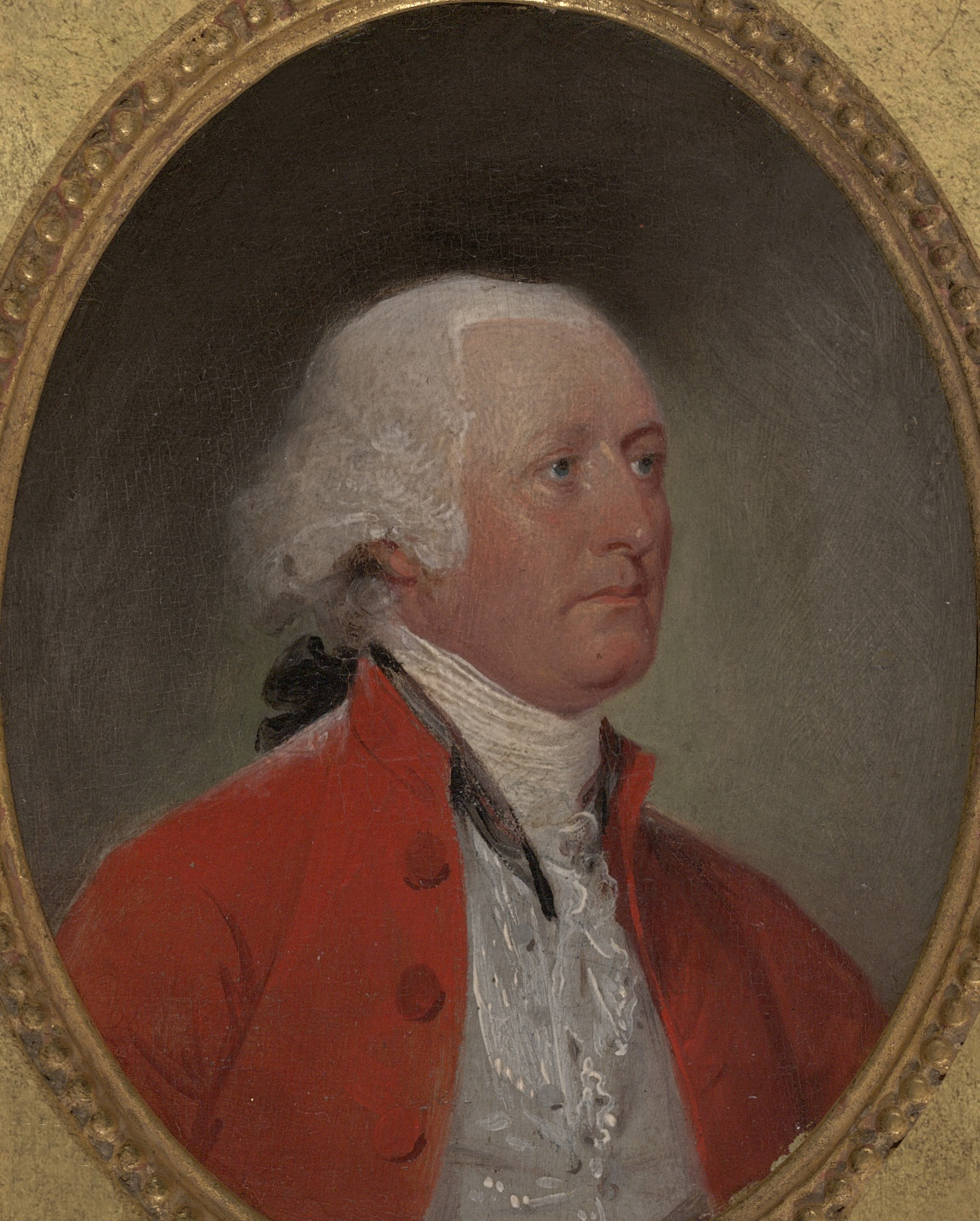
President pro tempore of the Senate Jacob Read

=== House of Representatives ===
==== Connecticut ====
All representatives were elected statewide on a general ticket.

▌At-large. John Allen (F)
▌At-large. Joshua Coit (F), until September 5, 1798

▌Jonathan Brace (F), from December 3, 1798

▌At-large. Samuel W. Dana (F)
▌At-large. James Davenport (F), until August 3, 1797

▌William Edmond (F), from November 13, 1797

▌At-large. Chauncey Goodrich (F)
▌At-large. Roger Griswold (F)
▌At-large. Nathaniel Smith (F)

==== Delaware ====
▌At-large. James A. Bayard (F)

==== Georgia ====
Both representatives were elected statewide on a general ticket.

▌At-large. Abraham Baldwin (DR)
▌At-large. John Milledge (DR)

==== Kentucky ====
▌1. Thomas T. Davis (DR)
▌2. John Fowler (DR)

==== Maryland ====
▌1. George Dent (F)
▌2. Richard Sprigg Jr. (DR)
▌3. William Craik (F)
▌4. George Baer Jr. (F)
▌5. Samuel Smith (DR)
▌6. William Matthews (F)
▌7. William Hindman (F)
▌8. John Dennis (F)

==== Massachusetts ====
▌1. Thomson J. Skinner (DR)
▌2. William Shepard (F)
▌3. Samuel Lyman (F)
▌4. Dwight Foster (F)
▌5. Nathaniel Freeman Jr. (DR)
▌6. John Reed Sr. (F)
▌7. Stephen Bullock (F)
▌8. Harrison Gray Otis (F)
▌9. Joseph Bradley Varnum (DR)
▌10. Samuel Sewall (F)
▌11. Theophilus Bradbury (F), until July 24, 1797

▌Bailey Bartlett (F), from November 27, 1797

▌12. Isaac Parker (F)
▌13. Peleg Wadsworth (F)
▌14. George Thatcher (F)

==== New Hampshire ====
All representatives were elected statewide on a general ticket.

▌At-large. Abiel Foster (F)
▌At-large. Jonathan Freeman (F)
▌At-large. William Gordon (F)
▌At-large. Jeremiah Smith (F), until July 26, 1797

▌Peleg Sprague (F), from December 15, 1797

==== New Jersey ====
All representatives were elected statewide on a general ticket.

▌At-large. Jonathan Dayton (F)
▌At-large. James H. Imlay (F)
▌At-large. James Schureman (F)
▌At-large. Thomas Sinnickson (F)
▌At-large. Mark Thomson (F)

==== New York ====
▌1. Jonathan N. Havens (DR)
▌2. Edward Livingston (DR)
▌3. Philip Van Cortlandt (DR)
▌4. Lucas C. Elmendorf (DR)
▌5. David Brooks (F)
▌6. Hezekiah L. Hosmer (F)
▌7. John E. Van Alen (F)
▌8. Henry Glen (F)
▌9. John Williams (F)
▌10. James Cochran (F)

==== North Carolina ====
▌1. Joseph McDowell Jr. (DR)
▌2. Matthew Locke (DR)
▌3. Robert Williams (DR)
▌4. Richard Stanford (DR)
▌5. Nathaniel Macon (DR)
▌6. James Gillespie (DR)
▌7. William Barry Grove (F)
▌8. Dempsey Burges (DR)
▌9. Thomas Blount (DR)
▌10. Nathan Bryan (DR), until June 4, 1798

▌Richard Dobbs Spaight (DR), from December 10, 1798

==== Pennsylvania ====
The 4th district was a plural district with two representatives.

▌1. John Swanwick (DR), until July 31, 1798

▌Robert Waln (F), from December 3, 1798

▌2. Blair McClenachan (DR)
▌3. Richard Thomas (F)
▌4. John Chapman (F)
▌4. Samuel Sitgreaves (F), until 1798

▌Robert Brown (DR), from December 4, 1798

▌5. George Ege (F), until October 1797

▌Joseph Hiester (DR), from December 1, 1797

▌6. John A. Hanna (DR)
▌7. John Wilkes Kittera (F)
▌8. Thomas Hartley (F)
▌9. Andrew Gregg (DR)
▌10. David Bard (DR)
▌11. William Findley (DR)
▌12. Albert Gallatin (DR)

==== Rhode Island ====
Both representatives were elected statewide on a general ticket.

▌At-large. Christopher G. Champlin (F)
▌At-large. Elisha R. Potter (F), until 1797

▌Thomas Tillinghast (F), from November 13, 1797

==== South Carolina ====
▌1. William L. Smith (F), until July 10, 1797

▌Thomas Pinckney (F), from November 23, 1797

▌2. John Rutledge Jr. (F)
▌3. Lemuel Benton (DR)
▌4. Thomas Sumter (DR)
▌5. Robert Goodloe Harper (F)
▌6. William Smith (DR)

==== Tennessee ====
▌At-large. Andrew Jackson (DR), until September, 1797

▌William C. C. Claiborne (DR), from November 23, 1797

==== Vermont ====
▌1. Matthew Lyon (DR)
▌2. Lewis R. Morris (F), from May 24, 1797

==== Virginia ====
▌1. Daniel Morgan (F)
▌2. David Holmes (DR)
▌3. James Machir (F)
▌4. Abram Trigg (DR)
▌5. John J. Trigg (DR)
▌6. Matthew Clay (DR)
▌7. Abraham B. Venable (DR)
▌8. Thomas Claiborne (DR)
▌9. William B. Giles (DR), until October 2, 1798

▌Joseph Eggleston (DR), from December 3, 1798

▌10. Carter B. Harrison (DR)
▌11. Josiah Parker (F)
▌12. Thomas Evans (F)
▌13. John Clopton (DR)
▌14. Samuel J. Cabell (DR)
▌15. John Dawson (DR)
▌16. Anthony New (DR)
▌17. Richard Brent (DR)
▌18. John Nicholas (DR)
▌19. Walter Jones (DR)

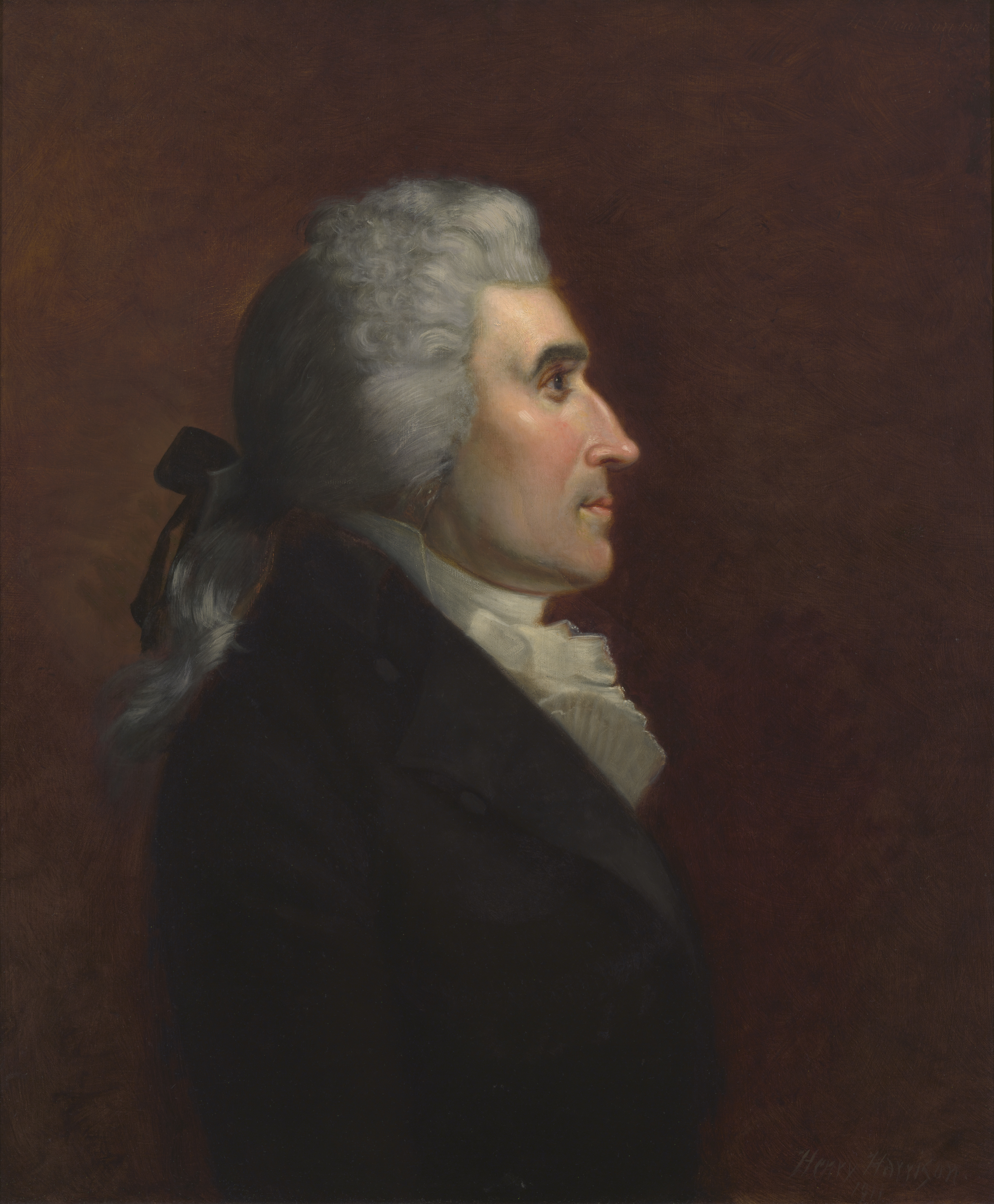
Speaker of the House Jonathan Dayton

== Changes in membership ==
The count below reflects changes from the beginning of this Congress

=== Senate ===
There were 9 resignations, 2 deaths, 1 expulsion, 1 late selection, and 2 elections to replace appointees. Neither party had a net gain of seats.

Senate changes
State (class)	Vacated by	Reason for change	Successor	Date of successor's formal installation (Note: When seated or oath administered, not necessarily when service began.)
Tennessee (1)	Vacant	Tennessee failed to elect a Senator on time	William Cocke (DR)	Appointed May 15, 1797
Tennessee (2)	William Blount (DR)	Expelled July 8, 1797	Joseph Anderson (DR)	Elected September 26, 1797
Tennessee (1)	William Cocke (DR)	Interim appointment until September 26, 1797	Andrew Jackson (DR)	Elected September 26, 1797
Rhode Island (2)	William Bradford (F)	Resigned sometime in October, 1797	Ray Greene (F)	Elected November 13, 1797
Vermont (1)	Isaac Tichenor (F)	Resigned October 17, 1797	Nathaniel Chipman (F)	Elected October 17, 1797
Maryland (3)	John Henry (F)	Resigned December 10, 1797	James Lloyd (F)	Elected December 11, 1797
New York (1)	Philip John Schuyler (F)	Resigned January 3, 1798	John Sloss Hobart (F)	Elected January 11, 1798
Delaware (2)	John Vining (F)	Resigned January 19, 1798	Joshua Clayton (F)	Elected January 19, 1798
Tennessee (1)	Andrew Jackson (DR)	Resigned sometime in April, 1798	Daniel Smith (DR)	Appointed October 6, 1798
New York (1)	John Sloss Hobart (F)	Resigned April 16, 1798	William North (F)	Appointed May 5, 1798
Delaware (2)	Joshua Clayton (F)	Died August 11, 1798	William H. Wells (F)	Elected January 17, 1799
New York (1)	William North (F)	Interim appointment until August 17, 1798	James Watson (F)	Elected August 17, 1798
New Jersey (1)	John Rutherfurd (F)	Resigned November 26, 1798	Franklin Davenport (F)	Appointed December 5, 1798
South Carolina (2)	John Hunter (DR)	Resigned November 26, 1798	Charles Pinckney (DR)	Elected December 6, 1798
Virginia (2)	Henry Tazewell (DR)	Died January 24, 1799	Vacant	Not filled in this Congress

=== House of Representatives ===
There were 9 resignations and 3 deaths. The Federalists had a 1-seat net loss and the Democratic-Republicans had a 1-seat net gain.

House changes
District	Vacated by	Reason for change	Successor	Date of successor's formal installation
Vermont 2	Vacant	Daniel Buck (F) had been re-elected, but declined to serve. Successor elected May 23, 1797.	Lewis R. Morris (F)	May 24, 1797
Rhode Island at-large	Elisha Potter (F)	Resigned sometime in 1797. Successor elected August 29, 1797.	Thomas Tillinghast (F)	Seated November 13, 1797
South Carolina 1	William L. Smith (F)	Resigned July 10, 1797. Successor elected September 4–5, 1797.	Thomas Pinckney (F)	Seated November 23, 1797
Massachusetts 11	Theophilus Bradbury (F)	Resigned July 24, 1797. Successor elected August 4, 1797.	Bailey Bartlett (F)	Seated November 27, 1797
New Hampshire at-large	Jeremiah Smith (F)	Resigned July 26, 1797. Successor elected August 28, 1797.	Peleg Sprague (F)	Seated December 15, 1797
Connecticut at-large	James Davenport (F)	Died August 3, 1797. Successor elected September 18, 1797.	William Edmond (F)	Seated November 13, 1797
Tennessee at-large	Andrew Jackson (DR)	Resigned sometime in September 1797 to become U.S. Senator. Successor elected September 26, 1797.	William C.C. Claiborne (DR)	Seated November 23, 1797
Pennsylvania 5	George Ege (F)	Resigned sometime in October 1797. Successor elected October 10, 1797.	Joseph Hiester (DR)	Seated December 1, 1797
Pennsylvania 4	Samuel Sitgreaves (F)	Resigned sometime in 1798. Successor elected October 9, 1798.	Robert Brown (DR)	Seated December 4, 1798
North Carolina 10	Nathan Bryan (DR)	Died June 4, 1798. Successor elected August 2, 1798.	Richard Dobbs Spaight (DR)	Seated December 10, 1798
Pennsylvania 1	John Swanwick (DR)	Died July 31, 1798. Successor elected October 9, 1798.	Robert Waln (F)	Seated December 3, 1798
Connecticut at-large	Joshua Coit (F)	Died September 5, 1798. Successor elected October 22, 1798.	Jonathan Brace (F)	Seated December 3, 1798
Virginia 9	William Giles (DR)	Resigned October 2, 1798. Successor elected November 1, 1798.	Joseph Eggleston (DR)	Seated December 3, 1798

== Committees ==
Lists of committees and their party leaders.

=== Senate ===
- Whole

=== House of Representatives ===
- Claims (Chairman: Dwight Foster)
- Commerce and Manufactures (Chairman: Edward Livingston then Samuel Smith)
- Elections (Chairman: Joshua Coit then Joseph B. Varnum)
- Revisal and Unfinished Business (Chairman: Jeremiah Smith then Nathaniel Macon then George Thatcher)
- Rules (Select)
- Standards of Official Conduct
- Ways and Means (Chairman: William L. Smith then Robert Goodloe Harper)
- Whole

=== Joint committees ===
- Enrolled Bills (Chairman: Isaac Tichenor)

== Employees ==
- Architect of the Capitol: William Thornton

=== Senate ===
- Secretary: Samuel A. Otis
- Doorkeeper: James Mathers
- Chaplain: William White, Episcopalian

=== House of Representatives ===
- Clerk: John J. Beckley, until May 15, 1797
  - Jonathan W. Condy, elected May 15, 1797
- Sergeant at Arms: Joseph Wheaton
- Doorkeeper: Thomas Claxton
- Chaplain: Ashbel Green, Presbyterian

== See also ==
- 1796 United States elections (elections leading to this Congress)
  - 1796 United States presidential election
  - 1796–97 United States Senate elections
  - 1796–97 United States House of Representatives elections
- 1798 United States elections (elections during this Congress, leading to the next Congress)
  - 1798–99 United States Senate elections
  - 1798–99 United States House of Representatives elections
