= 1796 United States House of Representatives elections in North Carolina =

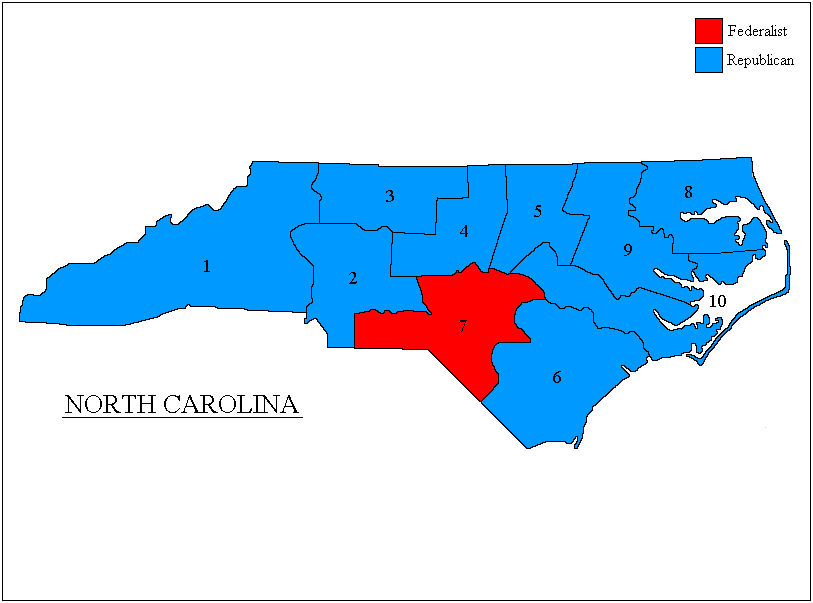
North Carolina's results by district

District	Incumbent	Party	First elected	Result	Candidates
North Carolina 1	James Holland	Democratic-Republican	1795	Incumbent lost re-election. New member elected. Democratic-Republican hold.	√ Joseph McDowell (Democratic-Republican); James Holland
North Carolina 2	Matthew Locke	Democratic-Republican	1793	Incumbent re-elected.	√ Matthew Locke (Democratic-Republican) 56.9% Nathaniel Alexander (Democratic-Republican) 27.1% Robert Irwin (Federalist) 15.8% Others 0.2%
North Carolina 3	Jesse Franklin	Democratic-Republican	1795	Incumbent lost re-election. New member elected. Democratic-Republican hold.	√ Robert Williams (Democratic-Republican); Jesse Franklin (Democratic-Republican)
North Carolina 4	William F. Strudwick	Federalist	1796 (Special)	Incumbent retired. New member elected. Democratic-Republican gain.	√ Richard Stanford (Democratic-Republican); Absalom Tatom (Democratic-Republican); William Sheppard (Federalist); Stephen Moore (Federalist)
North Carolina 5	Nathaniel Macon	Democratic-Republican	1791	Incumbent re-elected.	√ Nathaniel Macon (Democratic-Republican)
North Carolina 6	James Gillespie	Democratic-Republican	1793	Incumbent re-elected.	√ James Gillespie (Democratic-Republican); William H. Hill (Federalist); James Keenan; Gabriel Holmes (I)
North Carolina 7	William B. Grove	Federalist	1791	Incumbent re-elected.	√ William B. Grove (Federalist) 73.4% Duncan MacFarland (Democratic-Republican) 26.6%
North Carolina 8	Dempsey Burges	Democratic-Republican	1795	Incumbent re-elected.	√ Dempsey Burges (Democratic-Republican); Joseph Riddick (Democratic-Republican); James Gregory (Federalist); James Brown (Federalist)
North Carolina 9	Thomas Blount	Democratic-Republican	1793	Incumbent re-elected.	√ Thomas Blount (Democratic-Republican); Willis Alston (Federalist)
North Carolina 10	Nathan Bryan	Democratic-Republican	1795	Incumbent re-elected.	√ Nathan Bryan (Democratic-Republican) 54.1% Richard D. Spaight (Democratic-Republican) 45.9%

== See also ==
- United States House of Representatives elections, 1796 and 1797
- List of United States representatives from North Carolina
