= 1796 United States House of Representatives elections in New York =

United States House of Representatives elections in New York, 1796
- December 15, 1796

All 10 New York seats to the United States House of Representatives
	Majority party	Minority party
Party	Federalist	Democratic-Republican
Last election	4	6
Seats won	6	4
Seat change	▲2	▼2
Popular vote	17,265	9,890
Percentage	63.6%	36.4%

The 1796 United States House of Representatives elections in New York were held on December 15, 1796, to elect ten U.S. Representatives to represent the State of New York in the United States House of Representatives of the 5th United States Congress.

== Background ==
Ten U.S. Representatives had been elected in December 1794 to a term in the 4th United States Congress beginning on March 4, 1795. Their term would end on March 3, 1797.

== Congressional districts ==
On January 27, 1789, the New York State Legislature had divided the State of New York into six congressional districts which were not numbered. On December 18, 1792, the Legislature divided the State into ten districts, which were still not numbered, taking into account the new counties created in 1791. The geographical area of the congressional districts remained at this election the same as at the previous election in December 1794. A new county was created, Schoharie Co. Most of the new Schoharie County was taken from Albany County, and remained in the 8th District, a part was taken from Otsego County, and remained in the 10th District. Besides, inside the 10th District a new county had been created: Steuben Co.

- One district (later back-numbered as the 1st) comprising Kings, Queens and Suffolk counties.
- One district (later back-numbered as the 2nd) comprising New York County.
- One district (later back-numbered as the 3rd) comprising Westchester and Richmond counties.
- One district (later back-numbered as the 4th) comprising Orange and Ulster counties.
- One district (later back-numbered as the 5th) comprising Dutchess County.
- One district (later back-numbered as the 6th) comprising Columbia County.
- One district (later back-numbered as the 7th) comprising Clinton and Rensselaer counties.
- One district (later back-numbered as the 8th) comprising Albany and Schoharie counties.
- One district (later back-numbered as the 9th) comprising Washington and Saratoga counties.
- One district (later back-numbered as the 10th) comprising Montgomery, Ontario, Herkimer, Otsego, Tioga, Onondaga and Steuben counties.

Note: There are now 62 counties in the State of New York. The counties which are not mentioned in this list had not yet been established, or sufficiently organized, the area being included in one or more of the abovementioned counties.

== Result ==
6 Federalists and 4 Democratic-Republicans were elected. The incumbents Havens, Livingston, Van Cortlandt, Van Alen, Glen and Williams were re-elected; the incumbents Bailey and Cooper were defeated; and John Hathorn and Ezekiel Gilbert did not run for re-election.

1796 United States House election result
District	Federalist		Democratic-Republican		Also ran	
1	Selah Strong	648	Jonathan N. Havens	1,259		
2	James Watson	1,812	Edward Livingston	2,362		
3	Samuel Haight	1,003	Philip Van Cortlandt	1,016		
4	Conrad E. Elmendorf	1,514	Lucas Elmendorf	1,937		
5	David Brooks	1,220	Theodorus Bailey	1,018		
6	Hezekiah L. Hosmer	1,036	John P. Van Ness	758		
7	John E. Van Alen	1,585	John Woodworth	1,152		
8	Henry Glen	480	Peter Swart	138		
9	John Williams	1,325	Douw I. Fonda	210	James Gordon (Fed.)	575
10	James Cochran	3,092	Charles Williamson	40	William Cooper (Fed.)	2,975

Note: The Anti-Federalists called themselves "Republicans." However, at the same time, the Federalists called them "Democrats" which was meant to be pejorative. After some time both terms got more and more confused, and sometimes used together as "Democratic Republicans" which later historians have adopted (with a hyphen) to describe the party from the beginning, to avoid confusion with both the later established and still existing Democratic and Republican parties.

== Aftermath ==
The House of Representatives of the 5th United States Congress met for the first time at Congress Hall in Philadelphia on May 15, 1797, and all ten representatives took their seats on this day.

== Sources ==
- The New York Civil List compiled in 1858 (see: pg. 65 for district apportionment; pg. 68 for Congressmen [has wrong district numbers preceding the names])
- Members of the Fifth United States Congress
- Election result 1st D. at Tufts University Library project "A New Nation Votes"
- Election result 2nd D. at Tufts University Library project "A New Nation Votes"
- Election result 3rd D. at Tufts University Library project "A New Nation Votes"
- Election result 4th D. at Tufts University Library project "A New Nation Votes"
- Election result 5th D. at Tufts University Library project "A New Nation Votes"
- Election result 6th D. at Tufts University Library project "A New Nation Votes"
- Election result 7th D. at Tufts University Library project "A New Nation Votes"
- Election result 8th D. at Tufts University Library project "A New Nation Votes"
- Election result 9th D. at Tufts University Library project "A New Nation Votes"
- Election result 10th D. at Tufts University Library project "A New Nation Votes"
