= 1794 United States House of Representatives elections in New York =

United States House of Representatives elections in New York, 1794
- December 12, 1794

All 10 New York seats to the United States House of Representatives
	Majority party	Minority party
Party	Democratic-Republican	Federalist
Last election	3	7
Seats won	6	4
Seat change	▲3	▼3
Popular vote	11,694	11,921
Percentage	49.5%	50.5%

The 1794 United States House of Representatives elections in New York were held on December 12, 1794, to elect ten United States Representatives to represent the State of New York in the United States House of Representatives of the 4th United States Congress.

== Background ==
Ten U.S. Representatives had been elected in January 1793 to a term in the 3rd United States Congress beginning on March 4, 1793. One representative, Silas Talbot (10th D.), had accepted in June 1794 an appointment to the United States Navy, and thus vacated his seat. No special election was called to fill the vacancy. The other nine representatives' term would end on March 3, 1795.

== Congressional districts ==
On January 27, 1789, the New York State Legislature had divided the State of New York into six congressional districts which were not numbered. On December 18, 1792, the Legislature divided the State into ten districts, which were still not numbered, taking into account the new counties created in 1791. The congressional districts remained at this election the same as at the previous election, only inside the Tenth District a new county, Onondaga, was created in 1794.

- One district (later back-numbered as the 1st) comprising Kings, Queens and Suffolk counties.
- One district (later back-numbered as the 2nd) comprising New York County.
- One district (later back-numbered as the 3rd) comprising Westchester and Richmond counties.
- One district (later back-numbered as the 4th) comprising Orange and Ulster counties.
- One district (later back-numbered as the 5th) comprising Dutchess County.
- One district (later back-numbered as the 6th) comprising Columbia County.
- One district (later back-numbered as the 7th) comprising Clinton and Rensselaer counties.
- One district (later back-numbered as the 8th) comprising Albany County.
- One district (later back-numbered as the 9th) comprising Washington and Saratoga counties.
- One district (later back-numbered as the 10th) comprising Montgomery, Ontario, Herkimer, Otsego, Tioga and Onondaga counties.

Note: There are now 62 counties in the State of New York. The counties which are not mentioned in this list had not yet been established, or sufficiently organized, the area being included in one or more of the abovementioned counties.

== Result ==
6 Democratic-Republicans and 4 Federalists were elected. Thomas Tredwell, the incumbent from the 1st District, had moved to Plattsburgh and ran for re-election in the 7th District, but was defeated by the local incumbent John E. Van Alen. Of the other incumbents, Watts was defeated; Glen, Gilbert, Bailey and Van Cortlandt were re-elected; and Peter Van Gaasbeck and James Gordon did not run for re-election.

1794 United States House election result
District	Democratic-Republican		Federalist		Democratic-Republican		Federalist		Democratic-Republican	
1	Jonathan Nicoll Havens	815	Samuel Jones	494	Whitehead Cornwell	554			John Smith	251
2	Edward Livingston	1,843	John Watts	1,638						
3	Philip Van Cortlandt	992	Richard Morris	972						
4	John Hathorn	1,519	Conrad E. Elmendorf	583	Peter Gansevoort	2	William Thompson	41		
5	Theodorus Bailey	1,449	David Brooks	1,090						
6	John Bay	441	Ezekiel Gilbert	1,168	Mathew Adgate	419				
7	Thomas Tredwell	298	John E. Van Alen	1,109						
8	Abraham Yates	20	Henry Glen	677	John Tayler	19			James Fairlie	4
9	John Williams	1,297	Ebenezer Russell	1,079	Alexander Webster	305				
10	John Winn	1,426	William Cooper	2,535	Jonathan Fitch	40	James Cochran	535		

Note: The Anti-Federalists called themselves "Republicans." However, at the same time, the Federalists called them "Democrats" which was meant to be pejorative. After some time both terms got more and more confused, and sometimes used together as "Democratic Republicans" which later historians have adopted (with a hyphen) to describe the party from the beginning, to avoid confusion with both the later established and still existing Democratic and Republican parties.

== Aftermath ==
The House of Representatives of the 4th United States Congress met for the first time at Congress Hall in Philadelphia on December 7, 1795, and nine of the ten representatives took their seats on this day. Only John Hathorn arrived late, and took his seat on December 17.

== Sources ==
- The New York Civil List compiled in 1858 (see: pg. 65 for district apportionment; pg. 68 for Congressmen)
- Members of the Fourth United States Congress
- Election result 1st D. at Tufts University Library project "A New Nation Votes"
- Election result 2nd D. at Tufts University Library project "A New Nation Votes"
- Election result 3rd D. at Tufts University Library project "A New Nation Votes"
- Election result 4th D. at Tufts University Library project "A New Nation Votes"
- Election result 5th D. at Tufts University Library project "A New Nation Votes"
- Election result 6th D. at Tufts University Library project "A New Nation Votes"
- Election result 7th D. at Tufts University Library project "A New Nation Votes"
- Election result 8th D. at Tufts University Library project "A New Nation Votes"
- Election result 9th D. at Tufts University Library project "A New Nation Votes"
- Election result 10th D. at Tufts University Library project "A New Nation Votes"
