= 1795 Connecticut's at-large congressional district special election =

A special election was held in Connecticut's at-large congressional district on April 13, 1795, to fill a vacancy left by Jonathan Trumbull, Jr. (F)'s election to the Senate.

== Election results ==
Candidate	Party	Votes	Percent
Nathaniel Smith	Federalist	1,382	39.5%
James Davenport	Federalist	671	19.2%
Samuel W. Dana	Federalist	554	15.8%
William Edmond	Federalist	260	7.4%
John Allen	Federalist	242	6.9%
David Daggett	Federalist	223	6.4%
John Treadwell	Federalist	166	4.7%

== See also ==
- List of special elections to the United States House of Representatives
- United States House of Representatives elections, 1794 and 1795
- List of United States representatives from Connecticut
