= Jonathan Brace =

American politician

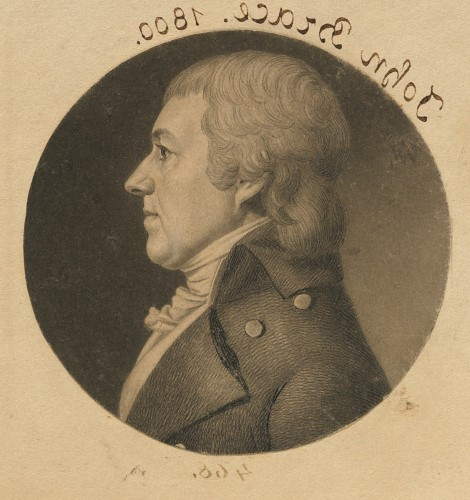

Member of the U.S. House of Representatives from Connecticut's at-large district
- In office December 3, 1798 – May 1800
- Preceded by: William Edmond
- Succeeded by: Elizur Goodrich

Member of the Connecticut General Assembly
- In office 1788; 1791-1794

Personal details
- Born: November 12, 1754 Harwinton, Connecticut Colony, British America
- Died: August 26, 1837 (aged 82) Hartford, Connecticut, U.S.
- Citizenship: United States
- Party: Federalist
- Spouse: Ann White Brace
- Children: Thomas Kimberly Brace
- Parent(s): Jonathan Brace and Mary (Messenger) Brace
- Education: Yale College
- Occupation: Lawyer, Politician, Judge

Jonathan Brace (November 12, 1754 – August 26, 1837) was an eighteenth-century American lawyer, politician and judge. He served as a United States representative from Connecticut.

== Biography ==
Brace was born in Harwinton in the Connecticut Colony, the son of Jonathan Brace and Mary (Messenger) Brace. He attended the common schools and graduated from Yale College in 1779. He studied law under Founding Father Oliver Ellsworth, future Chief Justice of the United States. Brace was admitted to the bar in Bennington, Vermont, in 1779, and began the practice of law in Pawlet, Vermont.

Brace moved to Manchester, Vermont, in 1782 and continued practicing law. He was a member of the council of censors to revise the constitution as well as a prosecuting attorney for Bennington County from 1784 to 1785. He then moved to Glastonbury, Connecticut, in January 1786 but was not admitted to the Connecticut bar until 1790.

Brace was a member of the Connecticut General Assembly in 1788 and from 1791 to 1794. He was chosen assistant in the council in May 1798. Brace moved to Hartford, Connecticut, in 1794 and was a judge of the city court from 1797 until 1815, with the exception of two years. He was elected as a Federalist candidate to the Fifth Congress to fill the vacancy caused by the death of Joshua Coit, and was reelected to the Sixth Congress. He served in Congress from December 3, 1798, until his resignation in May 1800. He also served as a judge of the Connecticut Supreme Court of Errors in 1798 and 1799.

He served as an assistant in the council of the State from 1802 to 1818. Brace was appointed prosecuting attorney for Hartford County in December 1807 and served until May 1809, when he resigned. He was appointed judge of the county court and of probate in May 1809 and continued as judge of the county court until 1821 and as judge of probate until 1824.

He was the mayor of Hartford from 1815 to 1824, and was also a member of the state senate in 1819 and 1820. He died in Hartford on August 26, 1837, and was buried in the Old North Cemetery in Hartford.

== Personal life ==
Brace was married to Ann White Brace. Their son Thomas Kimberly Brace was the principal founder and developer of the Aetna Insurance Company.

U.S. House of Representatives
Preceded by Joshua Coit	Member of the U.S. House of Representatives from Connecticut's at-large congressional district 1798–1800	Succeeded by John Cotton Smith
