= Peleg Sprague =

Peleg Sprague may refer to:

- Peleg Sprague (Maine politician) (1793–1880), American politician from Maine; United States federal judge
- Peleg Sprague (New Hampshire politician) (1756–1800), American politician from New Hampshire
