= 1798 United States elections =

Elections for the 6th U.S. Congress

- ← 1796 1797 1798 1799 1800 → Midterm elections
- Incumbent president: ▌John Adams (F)
- Next Congress: 6th

Senate elections
- Overall control: Federalist hold
- Seats contested: 11 of 32 seats
- Net seat change: 0

House elections
- Overall control: Federalist hold
- Seats contested: All 106 voting seats
- Net seat change: Federalist +3

Elections to the 6th United States Congress were held in 1798 and 1799, during the middle of Federalist President John Adams's term. The election took place during the First Party System, as political competition between the Federalists and the Democratic-Republicans became increasingly organized. Federalists retained control of both chambers of Congress, gaining three seats in the House of Representatives while partisan balance of the Senate remained unchanged.

== Background ==
The elections occurred amid growing tensions between the United States and France. Federalists generally favored a stronger central government and closer commercial relations with Great Britain, while Democratic-Republicans favored a more limited federal government and were more sympathetic to France.

In April 1798, the Adams administration released dispatches describing the XYZ Affair, in which French intermediaries had demanded payments from American diplomats seeking negotiations with the French government. Public outrage over the affair contributed to heightened anti-French sentiment, and the dispute developed into the undeclared naval conflict known as the Quasi-War.

During the same period, the Federalist-controlled 5th Congress enacted the Alien and Sedition Acts. The laws increased the residency requirement for citizenship, authorized federal action against certain non-citizens, and criminalized some forms of criticism of the federal government. They became a major source of partisan controversy and were primarily enforced against supporters and newspaper editors associated with the Democratic-Republicans.

== Results ==
=== House of Representatives ===
All 106 voting seats in the House were contested. The Federalists gained three seats, increasing their majority from 57-49 in the 5th Congress to 60-46 in the 6th Congress. Federalist Representative Theodore Sedgwick of Massachusetts was subsequently elected speaker of the House.

=== Senate ===
Eleven of the Senate's 32 seats were scheduled for regular election. The elections produced no net partisan change, leaving the Federalists with 22 seats and the Democratic-Republicans with 10.

== See also ==
- 1798–99 United States House of Representatives elections
- 1798–99 United States Senate elections
