= 1797 Massachusetts's 11th congressional district special election =

A special election was held in Massachusetts's 11th congressional district on August 4, 1797, to fill a vacancy left by the resignation of Theophilus Bradbury (F) upon his appointment to the Massachusetts Supreme Judicial Court on July 24, 1797.

== Election results ==
Candidate	Party	Votes	Percent
Bailey Bartlett	Federalist	451	81.4%
Scattering		103	18.6%

Bartlett took his seat November 27, 1797

== See also ==
- List of special elections to the United States House of Representatives
