= 1797 Connecticut's at-large congressional district special election =

William Edmond (Federalist) was elected to represent one of the four seats in Connecticut's at-large congressional district in late 1797. He replaced James Davenport (Federalist) who had died August 3, 1797.

== See also ==
- United States House of Representatives elections, 1796#Connecticut
