= 1798 North Carolina's 10th congressional district special election =

A special election was held in North Carolina's 10th congressional district on August 2, 1798, to fill a vacancy left by the death of Nathan Bryan (DR) on June 4, 1798

== Election results ==
Candidate	Party	Votes	Percent
Richard Dobbs Spaight	Democratic-Republican	987	51.2%
Thomas Badger	Federalist	940	48.8%

Spaight took his seat December 10, 1798

== See also ==
- List of special elections to the United States House of Representatives
- United States House of Representatives elections, 1798 and 1799
