= 1797 Pennsylvania's 5th congressional district special election =

A special election was held in Pennsylvania's 5th congressional district on October 10, 1797, to fill a vacancy caused by the resignation of George Ege (F).

Candidate	Party	Votes	Percent
Joseph Hiester	Democratic-Republican	1,259	100%

== See also ==
- List of special elections to the United States House of Representatives
