= 1797 New Hampshire's at-large congressional district special election =

A special election was held in New Hampshire's at-large congressional district on August 28, 1797, to fill a vacancy created by the resignation of Jeremiah Smith (F) on July 26 of the same year. Smith had been appointed United States Attorney for the District of New Hampshire.

== Election results ==
New Hampshire electoral law required a majority for election. As no candidate won a majority on the first ballot, a run-off election was held October 30, 1797

Candidate	Party	First ballot		Second ballot	
Candidate	Party	Votes	Percent	Votes	Percent
Peleg Sprague	Federalist	2,739	43.3%	3,697	66.6%
Woodbury Langdon	Democratic-Republican	1,423	22.5%	1,858	33.4%
Edward Livermore	Federalist	1,349	21.3%		
Others		811	12.8%		

== See also ==
- List of special elections to the United States House of Representatives
