= Thomas Terry Davis =

American politician

Member of the U.S. House of Representatives from Kentucky's 1st district
- In office March 4, 1797 – March 3, 1803
- Preceded by: Christopher Greenup
- Succeeded by: Matthew Lyon

Member of Kentucky House of Representatives
- In office 1795–1797

Personal details
- Born: Thomas Terry Davis before 1789
- Died: November 15, 1807 Jeffersonville, Indiana, United States
- Party: Democratic-Republican
- Spouse: Elizabeth Davis
- Occupation: Judge, politician
- Profession: Law

Thomas Terry Davis (before 1789 – November 15, 1807) was a United States representative from Kentucky.

== Education and early career ==
Davis studied law and in 1789 was admitted to the Kentucky bar. He was a lawyer in private practice and was deputy attorney, Kentucky; he was first prosecuting attorney for district, Kentucky and was a member of the Kentucky House of Representatives from 1795 to 1797.

== National political career ==
Davis was elected as a Democratic-Republican to the 5th, 6th and 7th Congresses, serving from March 4, 1797, to March 3, 1803.

He was appointed United States judge of Indiana Territory Supreme Court on February 8, 1803, and was chancellor of Indiana Territory in 1806 and 1807. He presided over the treason trial of Davis Floyd during his tenure there.

== Personal life ==
Davis was a Freemason, he married Elizabeth Robards, who went on to marry Floyd 2 years after Davis' death. He died in Jeffersonville, Indiana.

U.S. House of Representatives
Preceded by Christopher Greenup	Member of the U.S. House of Representatives from Kentucky's 1st congressional district 1797–1803	Succeeded by Matthew Lyon
