= John Williams (Salem, New York) =

American physician and politician from Salem, New York

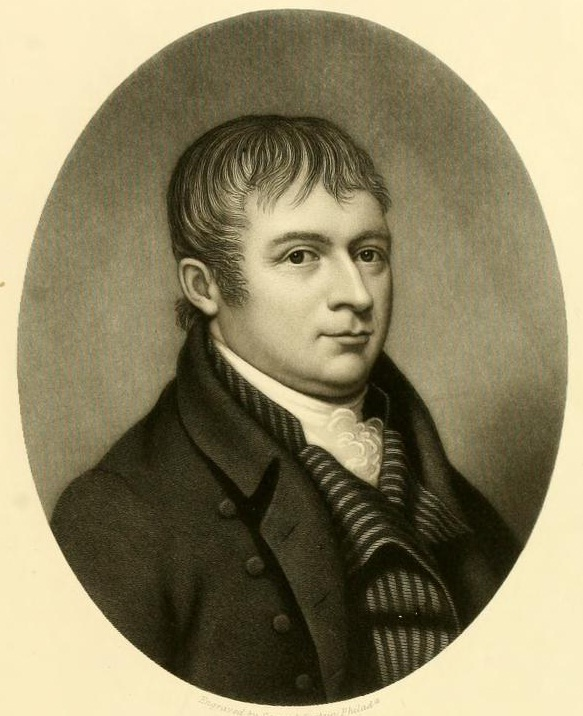

Member of the U.S. House of Representatives from New York's 9th district
- In office March 4, 1795 – March 3, 1799
- Preceded by: James Gordon
- Succeeded by: Jonas Platt

Personal details
- Born: September 1752 Barnstaple, Devonshire, England, Great Britain
- Died: July 22, 1806 (aged 53) Salem, New York, U.S.
- Resting place: Salem Revolutionary Cemetery, Salem, New York
- Party: Democratic-Republican Party (before 1796); Federalist Party (from 1796)
- Spouse: Susanna (Thomas) Turner
- Children: 4
- Occupation: Physician

John Williams (September 1752 – July 22, 1806) was an American physician and politician from Salem, New York. He was most notable for his service in the United States House of Representatives from 1795 to 1799.

== Life ==
Williams was born in Barnstaple, Devonshire, England in September 1752. He received a liberal education, studied medicine and surgery in St. Thomas' Hospital, London, and served for one year as surgeon’s mate on an English man-of-war. He immigrated to America in 1773 and settled in New Perth, Charlotte County, New York (now Salem, Washington County), where he engaged in an extensive medical practice. He married Susanna (Thomas) Turner, and they had four children. After the death of his first wife, he married Mrs. Mary Townley.

Williams was a member of the New York Provincial Congress in 1775; he was reelected and served until its dissolution in 1777. He was appointed surgeon of state militia forces in 1775. Williams was a named colonel of the Charlotte County militia regiment in 1776 and retained command throughout the Revolutionary War. He was a member of the New York State Senate from 1777 to 1779 when he was expelled for fraud and theft. One act of which he was accused was the submission of false muster and payrolls, which enabled him to draw government money for paying soldiers, but which he then kept. He was also accused of holding of courts-martial which were not authorized by militia regulations and fining soldiers who were found guilty, after which he withheld their salaries to pay the fines. He was later exonerated and resumed his political and military careers.

He was a member of the New York State Assembly in 1781 and 1782, and again a member of the New York State Senate from 1782 to 1794. Williams was appointed a member of the first board of regents of the University of the State of New York in 1784. He served as brigadier general of militia in 1786.

During 1788 when the American people were debating whether their states should ratify the proposed Constitution of the United States, Williams was an Anti-Federalist, meaning that he opposed the proposed Constitution. Williams is one of several people suspected of having written very influential Anti-Federalist essays under the pen name Brutus. Williams was subsequently a delegate to the State ratification convention in 1788, where the Anti-Federalists failed to stop the Constitution, but succeeded in obtaining assurances that a Bill of Rights would be added.

He was a member of the Council of Appointment in 1789. In March 1789, Williams received a small number of votes running as a Democratic-Republican in the 5th District for Congress, but was defeated by Federalist Peter Silvester. In January 1793, Williams ran again as a Democratic-Republican for Congress, this time in the 9th District to which Washington County had been re-districted, but was defeated by Federalist James Gordon.

In December 1794, Williams was elected as a Democratic-Republican to the 4th, and in December 1796 was re-elected as a Federalist to the 5th United States Congress, serving from March 4, 1795 to March 3, 1799. In April 1798, he ran for re-election as a Federalist in the 7th District to which Washington County had been re-districted, but was defeated by Democratic-Republican John Thompson. In April 1802, he ran for election again as a Federalist in the 12th District to which Washington County had been re-districted, but was defeated by Democratic-Republican David Thomas.

He was a large landholder. He owned slaves. He was a promoter and director of a company organized to build the Erie Canal as a private enterprise, the project later being taken over and completed by the State, and a judge of the county court. Williams died in Salem on July 22, 1806; his interment was at Salem Revolutionary Cemetery.

The Salem chapter of the Daughters of the American Revolution is named for Williams and Israel Harris.

== See also ==
- List of New York Legislature members expelled or censured

U.S. House of Representatives
Preceded by James Gordon	Member of the U.S. House of Representatives from New York's 9th congressional district 1795–1799	Succeeded by Jonas Platt
