= 1798 Pennsylvania's 1st congressional district special election =

A special election was held in Pennsylvania's 1st congressional district on October 9, 1798, to fill a vacancy caused by the death of John Swanwick (DR) on August 1, 1798. The election was held on the same day as elections to the 6th Congress.

== Election results ==
Candidate	Party	Votes	Percent
Robert Waln	Federalist	866	69.5%
Samuel Miles	Democratic-Republican	380	30.5%

== See also ==
- List of special elections to the United States House of Representatives
- United States House of Representatives elections, 1798 and 1799
