= Jonathan Freeman (politician) =

American politician (1745–1808)

Member of the U.S. House of Representatives from New Hampshire's at-large district
- In office March 4, 1797 – March 4, 1801
- Preceded by: Nicholas Gilman
- Succeeded by: Samuel Livermore

Member of the New Hampshire Senate
- In office 1789-1791

Member of the New Hampshire House of Representatives
- In office 1787-1789

Personal details
- Born: March 21, 1745 Mansfield, Tolland County, Connecticut Colony, British America
- Died: August 20, 1808 (aged 63) Hanover, Grafton County, New Hampshire, US
- Resting place: Hanover Center Cemetery; Hanover, Grafton County; New Hampshire
- Party: Federalist Party
- Spouse: Sarah Huntington Freeman
- Children: Peyton R. Freeman; Jonathan Freeman; Christopher Freeman; Edward Freeman; Sarah Freeman; Samuel Freeman(died as infant); Son Freeman (died as infant); Asa Freeman; Samuel Freeman (died as infant); Samuel Freeman; Hanna Freeman
- Profession: Farmer; Politician

Jonathan Freeman (March 21, 1745 – August 20, 1808) was an American politician and a United States representative from New Hampshire.

== Early life ==
Born in Mansfield, Connecticut, Freeman attended the public schools and moved to New Hampshire in 1769, settling in Hanover.

== Career ==
Freeman engaged in agricultural pursuits and was town clerk from March 1778 to December 1787. He was also justice of the peace and, from 1789 to 1797, executive councilor. He was Treasurer of Dartmouth College from 1789 to 1808 as well as a trustee of the college from 1793 to 1808.

A member of the New Hampshire House of Representatives from 1787 to 1789, Freeman also served in the State Senate from 1789 to 1794. He was a delegate to the Constitutional convention of 1791, and a member of the State council.

Elected as a Federalist to the Fifth and Sixth Congresses, Freeman served as United States Representative for the state of New Hampshire from March 4, 1797, to March 3, 1801. After his service, he resumed agricultural pursuits.

== Death ==
Freeman died in Hanover on August 20, 1808 (age 63 years, 152 days). He is interred at Hanover Center Cemetery, Hanover, New Hampshire.

== Family life ==
Son of Edmund and Martha Otis Freeman, Freeman married Sarah Huntington on February 2, 177, and she bore eleven children of whom nine lived beyond infancy: Peyton R., Jonathan, Christopher, Edward, Sarah, Asa, Samuel, and Hanna. His nephew, Nathaniel Freeman Jr., was a U.S. Representative from Massachusetts.

U.S. House of Representatives
Preceded by Nicholas Gilman	U.S. Representative from New Hampshire's at-large congressional district 1797—1801	Succeeded by Samuel Livermore
