= Bailey Bartlett =

American politician (1750–1830)

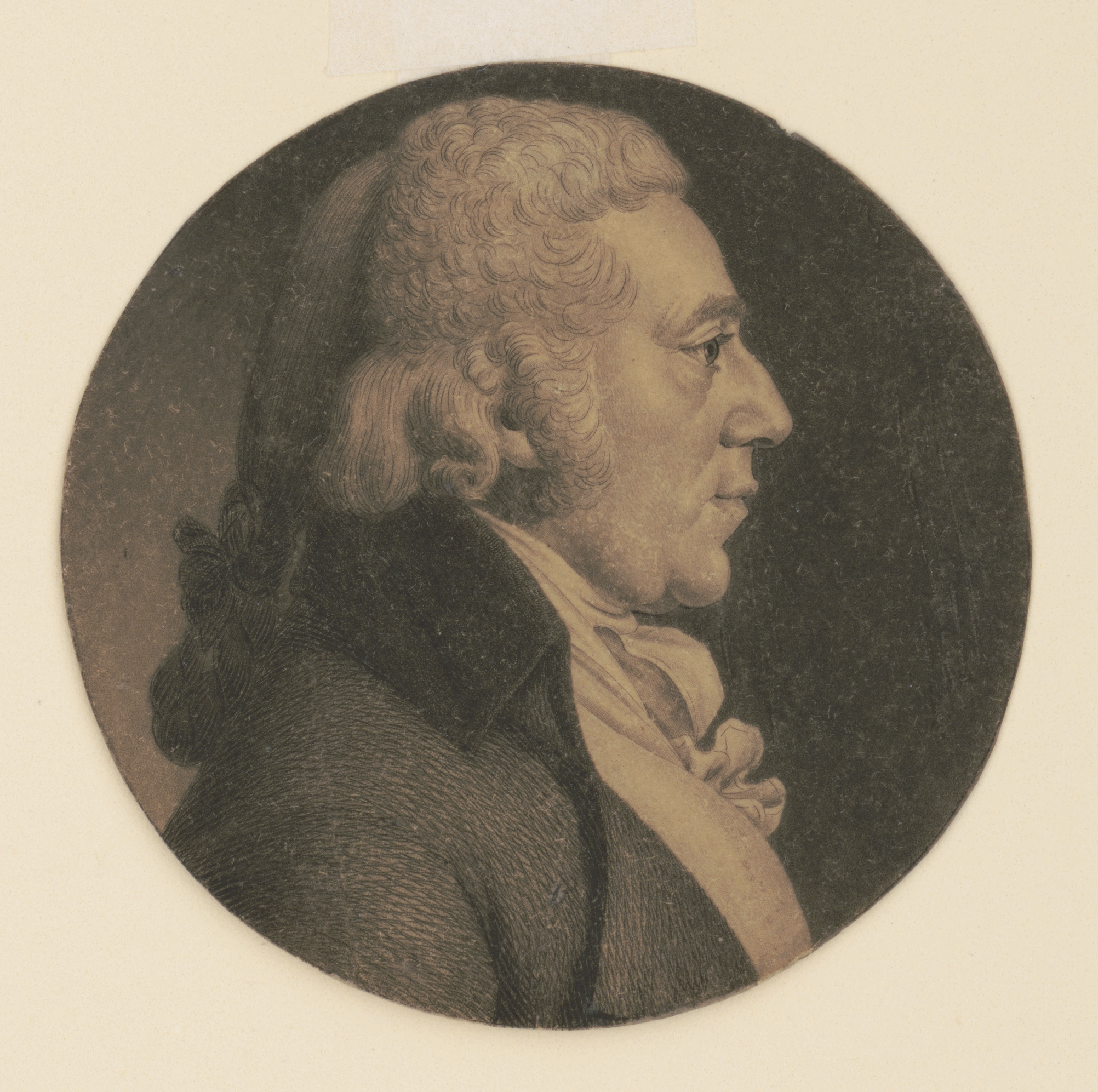

Member of the U.S. House of Representatives from Massachusetts's 11th district
- In office November 27, 1797 – March 3, 1801
- Preceded by: Theophilus Bradbury
- Succeeded by: Manasseh Cutler

Member of the Massachusetts House of Representatives
- In office 1781-1784; 1788

Member of the Massachusetts Senate
- In office 1789

Personal details
- Born: January 29, 1750 Haverhill, Province of Massachusetts Bay, British America
- Died: September 9, 1830 (aged 80) Haverhill, Massachusetts, U.S.
- Party: Federalist
- Spouse: Peggy Leonard White
- Children: Anna Bailey Bartlet, b. 1787; Elizabeth; Margaret; Sarah; Harriet; Catherine Leonard; Edwin; Abby Osgood; Charles Leonard; Mary Augusta; Francis; Louisa Ameila.

Bailey Bartlett (January 29, 1750 – September 9, 1830) was a member of the U.S. House of Representatives from Massachusetts.

== Early life ==
He was born in Haverhill in the Province of Massachusetts Bay to Enoch Bartlett (April 5, 1715 – January 1789) and Anna Bayley (March 4, 1725 – January 23, 1750) and engaged in mercantile pursuits there until 1789.

In 1786 Bartlett married Peggy Leonard White. Together they had twelve children.

== Career ==
He was a member of the Massachusetts House of Representatives from 1781 to 1784, and again in 1788. He was a member of the convention which adopted the Constitution of the United States in 1788. He served in the Massachusetts Senate the next year. He was appointed high sheriff of Essex County by Governor John Hancock and served from July 1, 1789, until December 5, 1811. He was elected as a Federalist to the Fifth Congress to fill the vacancy after the resignation of Theophilus Bradbury. He was reelected to the Sixth Congress and served from November 27, 1797, to March 3, 1801. He was not a candidate for renomination in 1800. He served as treasurer of Essex County in 1812. He was again appointed high sheriff of Essex County on June 20, 1812, and served until his death. He was a delegate to the Massachusetts Constitutional Convention of 1820–1821.

== Death and interment ==
He died on September 9, 1830, in Haverhill, Massachusetts, and is buried in Pentucket Cemetery, Haverhill, Essex County, Massachusetts.

== Notes ==
U.S. House of Representatives
Preceded by Theophilus Bradbury	Member of the U.S. House of Representatives from Massachusetts's 11th congressional district November 27, 1797 – March 3, 1801	Succeeded by Manasseh Cutler
