= Joseph Eggleston =

American politician (1754–1811)

Joseph Eggleston (November 24, 1754 – February 13, 1811) was an American farmer, soldier, and politician from Amelia County, Virginia. He represented Virginia in the U.S. Congress from 1798 until 1801.

He was the uncle of William S. Archer.

== Biography ==
Joseph Eggleston was born in Middlesex County to Joseph (1721–1792) and Judith (Segar, 1729–1806) Eggleston. In 1759 his parents moved to the newly built plantation house named Egglestetton in Amelia County. Joseph was tutored at home and then attended William and Mary College where he graduated with honors in 1776.

=== Revolutionary War ===
That same year he joined American Revolutionary War in the cavalry commanded by Henry "Light Horse Harry" Lee.

Eggleston became a captain when Lee organized his own irregular unit (Lee's Legion) of the Continental Army in 1778. He served with them throughout the war, but earned distinction in the Southern Campaign. He was cited for gallantry for his actions in the Battle of Guilford Court House on March 15, 1781. He won praise again in the siege of Augusta in June, as well as a promotion to Major.

The initial American success in the Battle of Eutaw Springs in September came from Major Eggleston's attack of the British advance units. Unfortunately the outcome of the battle was indecisive, even though the British casualties were twice those of the American forces.

== Personal life ==
After the war Eggleston returned home to Egglestetton, and on February 23, 1788 he married Sarah "Sally" Meade. They had three children: Joseph Everard (1790), Charles (1791) and William (1792). When his father (Joseph Sr.) died in 1792 he inherited the family seat and 400 acres (1.6 km^{2}). Over the years he would buy land and expand his holding to 730 acres (3.0 km^{2}).

Sally Eggleston died in 1794. In 1798, Joseph remarried, to his first cousin, Ann Cary Eggleston (daughter of his uncle John). She gave him two more children: Francis (1798) and Sarah Meade Eggleston (1802, named after his first wife.

Egglestetton was added to the National Register of Historic Places in 1980.

== Political career ==
Eggleston was elected to the Virginia state House of Delegates several times as a representative for Amelia County. In all he served thirteen years in the House (1785–88 and 1791–99). He was in the state Senate when U.S. Congressman William B. Giles resigned that post on October 2, 1798. In a special election, Eggleston won the rest of the term. Then he won the regular election for the next term, to serve in the U.S. House in the Sixth Congress.

=== Congress ===
Eggleston declined to be nominated in 1800, so his service in Congress extended from December 3, 1798 to March 3, 1801.

== Later career and death ==
He returned home, but was made a Justice of the Peace for Amelia County, and held that post until he died in 1811. Joseph died at home and was buried in the Churchyard of St. John's Episcopal Church. The church was also known as St. John's of Grub Hill, and the cemetery is now known as the Grub Hill Cemetery.

== Legacy ==
The main house at Egglestetton still stands in Egglestetton Road (Route 630) about 4 km north of Amelia Court House. The home is on the National Register of Historic Places but is a private residence. The Civil War general, Joseph Eggleston Johnston, was named for him, since Johnston's father had served in Eggleston's command in the Revolution.

U.S. House of Representatives
Preceded by William B. Giles	Member of the U.S. House of Representatives from Virginia's 9th congressional district December 3, 1798 - March 3, 1801	Succeeded by William B. Giles
