= James Gordon (New York politician) =

American politician (1739–1810)

Member of the New York State Senate
- In office 1797–1804

Member of the U.S. House of Representatives from New York
- In office March 4, 1791 – March 3, 1795
- Preceded by: Jeremiah Van Rensselaer
- Succeeded by: John Williams
- Constituency: 6th district (1791–1793); 9th district (1793–1795)

Member of the New York State Assembly
- In office 1790
- In office 1786
- In office 1777–1780

Personal details
- Born: October 31, 1739 Killead, County Antrim, Ireland
- Died: January 17, 1810 (aged 70) Ballston Spa, New York, U.S.
- Party: Pro-Administration
- Spouse: Mary Ball

James Gordon (October 31, 1739 – January 17, 1810) was an Irish-born American merchant, soldier, and politician.

He was born in Killead, County Antrim, Ireland, and left in 1758, settling in Schenectady, New York. From that base and from Detroit, Michigan, he traded with various Native American tribes. He owned slaves.

He served as militia lieutenant colonel in the American Revolution. In the 1780 British raid, known as "The Burning of the Valleys", he was captured and taken to Quebec, where he was held until he managed to escape in 1783.

During and after the war, first in 1777, held various legislative offices, serving in both houses of the state legislature, and representing the state in the United States House of Representatives from 1791 until 1795.

Gordon was married to Mary Ball, daughter of Rev. Eliphalet Ball, the founder of Ballston, New York.

Gordon Creek, in the Town of Ballston, is named for him.
