= George Ege =

American politician

Member of the U.S. House of Representatives from Pennsylvania's 5th district
- In office December 8, 1796 – October 1797
- Preceded by: Daniel Hiester
- Succeeded by: Joseph Hiester

Member of the Pennsylvania House of Representatives
- In office 1783

Personal details
- Born: March 9, 1748 Germantown, Province of Pennsylvania, British America
- Died: December 14, 1829 (aged 81) Marion Township, Berks County, Pennsylvania, U.S.
- Party: Federalist

George Ege (March 9, 1748 – December 14, 1829) was a United States Congressman, elected to the House of Representatives from Pennsylvania.

== Biography ==
He was born in Germantown in the Province of Pennsylvania, near Philadelphia, to Anna Catherine (Holz) and George-Michael Ege; the parents had immigrated from Germany in 1738. George's father participated in the French and Indian War, subsequently had health problems, and died in 1759, when George was just 11 years old. After his father's death, George and his two brothers, Jacob Ege (b. 1745) and Michael Ege (b. 1753), were sent to live and study with their mother's wealthy brother-in-law, Henry William Stiegel, a noted glass-maker who had mansions in Manheim and at Elizabeth Furnace, as well as several other outside business interests, including an iron operation he called “Charming Forge” in the Womelsdorf area of Berks County, PA. Under "Baron" Stiegel's tutelage, George and his brothers learned about how to run iron operations.

In 1774, George Ege succeeded the Baron as owner of Charming Forge and also built a mansion on the property, adjacent to the stream used by the iron mill; this mansion was also called "Charming Forge," and it is still occupied today. George prospered with the forge, added additional forges and properties, and became one of the wealthiest citizens of Berks County. He owned slaves as well.

In 1783, he was elected to the Pennsylvania House of Representatives. He was appointed one of the first associate judges of Berks County under the Pennsylvania Constitution in 1790, and served from 1791 until his resignation in 1818. He resumed his extensive business interests, and was elected as a Federalist to the Fourth Congress to fill the vacancy caused by the resignation of Daniel Hiester. He was reelected to the Fifth Congress and served from December 8, 1796, until October 1797, when he resigned. He resumed his business interests, and built and operated Schuylkill County Forge, near Port Clinton in 1804. He died at his residence, "Charming Forge," in Marion Township; interment was in Zion's Church Cemetery, Womelsdorf.

U.S. House of Representatives
Preceded by Daniel Hiester	Member of the U.S. House of Representatives from Pennsylvania's 5th congressional district 1796–1797	Succeeded by Joseph Hiester
