= Joshua Coit =

American lawyer and politician

Member of the U.S. House of Representatives from Connecticut's at-large district
- In office March 4, 1793 – September 5, 1798
- Preceded by: Amasa Learned
- Succeeded by: Zephaniah Swift

Member of the Connecticut House of Representatives
- In office 1784-1785; 1789-1790; 1792-1793

Personal details
- Born: October 7, 1758 New London, Connecticut Colony, British America
- Died: September 5, 1798 (aged 39) New London, Connecticut, U.S.
- Party: Pro-Administration Party and Federalist
- Spouse: Ann Borradell Hallam Coit
- Relations: Alfred Coit (nephew)
- Education: Harvard College
- Occupation: Lawyer, Politician

Joshua Coit (October 7, 1758 – September 5, 1798) was an eighteenth-century American lawyer and politician. He served as a United States representative from Connecticut.

== Early life and career ==
Coit was born in New London in the Connecticut Colony. He attended the common schools and graduated from Harvard College in 1776. Coit studied law, was admitted to the bar and began the practice of law in New London in 1779.

He served in the Connecticut House of Representatives from 1784 to 1785, 1789 to 1790, 1792 and 1793. Coit served as clerk during several terms and as speaker in 1793. He was elected as a Pro-Administration Party candidate to the Third United States Congress, and was reelected as a Federalist candidate to the Fourth United States Congress and the Fifth United States Congress, serving from 1793 until 1798. He was chairman of Committee on Elections in the Fifth Congress. Coit served as US representative from March 4, 1793, until his death in New London.

== See also ==
- List of members of the United States Congress who died in office (1790–1899)

U.S. House of Representatives
Preceded by Jonathan Sturges	Member of the U.S. House of Representatives from Connecticut's at-large congressional district 1789–1798	Succeeded by Vacant
