= Dempsey Burgess =

American politician (1751–1800)

Member of the U.S. House of Representatives from North Carolina's 8th district
- In office March 4, 1795 – March 3, 1799
- Preceded by: William Johnston Dawson
- Succeeded by: David Stone

Personal details
- Born: 1751 Camden County, North Carolina, British America
- Died: January 13, 1800 (aged 48–49) Camden County, North Carolina, U.S.
- Party: Democratic-Republican

Colonel Dempsey Burgess (1751 – January 13, 1800) was a Democratic-Republican U.S. Congressman from North Carolina between 1795 and 1799. He was commandeer of the Camden County Regiment of the North Carolina militia during the American Revolution.

He was born in 1751 in Shiloh, Camden County, North Carolina. Burgess was a member of the North Carolina Provincial Congress in 1775 and 1776.

He was an officer in the North Carolina militia during the American Revolutionary War. His military service record included:

- Major in the Pasquotank County Regiment of the North Carolina militia - 1775-1776
- Lt. Colonel in the 2nd Pasquotank County Regiment of the North Carolina militia - 1776-1777
- Lt. Colonel in the Camden County Regiment of the North Carolina militia - 1777-1779
- Colonel over the Camden County Regiment (1779)

Burgess was elected as a Republican to the 4th and 5th U.S. Congresses, serving from March 4, 1795 to March 3, 1799.

He died in Camden County, North Carolina on January 13, 1800 and was buried in Shiloh Baptist Churchyard.

U.S. House of Representatives
Preceded by William J. Dawson	Member of the U.S. House of Representatives from North Carolina's 8th congressional district 1795-1799	Succeeded by David Stone
