= Theophilus Bradbury =

American judge

Member of the U.S. House of Representatives from Massachusetts's 11th district
- In office March 4, 1795 – July 24, 1797
- Preceded by: None
- Succeeded by: Bailey Bartlett

Associate Justice of the Massachusetts Supreme Judicial Court
- In office 1797 – July 1803
- Preceded by: Increase Sumner
- Succeeded by: Seat ended

Member of the Massachusetts Senate
- In office 1791-1794

Personal details
- Born: November 13, 1739 Newbury, Province of Massachusetts Bay, British America
- Died: September 6, 1803 (aged 63) Newburyport, Massachusetts, U.S.
- Party: Federalist
- Education: Harvard College

Theophilus Bradbury (November 13, 1739 – September 6, 1803) was a U.S. representative from Massachusetts. He graduated from Harvard College in 1757; taught school and studied law in Portland; was admitted to the bar and commenced practice in Portland in 1761; moved to Newburyport in 1764 and continued the practice of law; member of the State senate 1791–1794; elected as a Federalist to the Fourth and Fifth Congresses and served from March 4, 1795, until July 24, 1797, when he resigned; appointed justice of the Massachusetts Supreme Judicial Court in 1797. He was elected a Fellow of the American Academy of Arts and Sciences in 1798. Bradbury was a member of the electoral college in 1800.

In February 1802 Bradbury was stricken with paralysis and totally disabled, he was removed from the bench in July 1803.

Bradbury died in Newburyport, Mass., September 6, 1803; interment in Old Hill Burying Ground in Newburyport.

== Notes ==
U.S. House of Representatives
| Preceded by David Cobb | Member of the U.S. House of Representatives from Massachusetts's 11th congressional district March 4, 1795 – July 24, 1797 | Succeeded by Bailey Bartlett |
Legal offices
| Preceded by Increase Sumner | Associate Justice of the Massachusetts Supreme Judicial Court; 1797 – July 1803 | Seat ended |
