= William Barry Grove =

American politician

William Barry Grove (January 15, 1764 – March 30, 1818) was a Federalist U.S. Congressman from the state of North Carolina from 1791 to 1803.

Grove was born in Fayetteville, North Carolina in 1764. After studying law, he was admitted to the state bar and became a practicing attorney. In 1786, Grove was first elected to the North Carolina House of Commons; he would serve again in 1788 and 1789. In 1788, Grove was a delegate to the state convention that considered ratification of the United States Constitution; he voted against postponement of ratification, but the state did not ratify the constitution at that time. Grove was also a delegate to the 1789 state convention where North Carolina finally ratified the federal constitution.

A trustee of the University of North Carolina at Chapel Hill and the president of the Fayetteville Branch of the Bank of the United States, Grove was elected to the Second United States Congress in 1790; he was re-elected to the 3rd through 7th Congresses as a Federalist, serving consecutively from March 4, 1791 to March 3, 1803. Although he ran for re-election in 1802, he was defeated for a seat in the 8th U.S. Congress.

Despite being a Federalist, Grove was close to Democratic-Republicans in his political views: he opposed Alexander Hamilton and his policies toward the public debt, preferring Jefferson, and he supported the French Revolution while criticizing Britain.

As a southern Federalist, Grove argued in favour of seizing Louisiana, at a time when (before the Louisiana Purchase) the Spanish intendant at New Orleans withdrew the right of free deposit for American goods. According to JH Broussard, Federalists believed "Jefferson should use the intendant's closure of deposit as an excuse to occupy the territory before France took formal control" from the Spanish. The Purchase occurred in 1803, against majority Federalist opposition.

Grove was an ardent Freemason and member of Phoenix Lodge No. 8, Fayetteville, North Carolina. He died in 1818 and is buried in Fayetteville's Grove Creek Cemetery.

U.S. House of Representatives
Preceded by John Sevier	Member of the U.S. House of Representatives from North Carolina's 5th congressional district 1791–1793	Succeeded by Nathaniel Macon
Preceded by District created	Member of the U.S. House of Representatives from North Carolina's 7th congressional district 1793-1803	Succeeded by Samuel D. Purviance
