= Nathan Bryan (North Carolina politician) =

American politician

Nathan Bryan (1748 – June 4, 1798) was a two-term U.S. congressman from North Carolina, serving from 1795 to 1798 when he died in office. He had previously been a Revolutionary War leader.

== Early life ==
Bryan was born in Craven County, North Carolina (present-day Jones County) in 1748.

He was a member of the North Carolina House of Commons in 1787 and from 1791 to 1794.

== Congress ==
In 1794, Bryan, a Republican, was elected to the 4th United States Congress and re-elected to the 5th U.S. Congress; he died in office on June 4, 1798 in Philadelphia, where he is buried.

Nathan served as a delegate from Craven County in the 1788 Hillsborough Convention that met to debate the United States Constitution.

=== Death and burial ===
He died on June 4, 1798 in Philadelphia and is buried at the Baptist burial ground there.

== See also ==
- List of members of the United States Congress who died in office (1790–1899)

U.S. House of Representatives
Preceded by Benjamin Williams	Member of the U.S. House of Representatives from North Carolina's 10th congressional district 1795–1798	Succeeded by Richard D. Spaight
