= Peleg Sprague (New Hampshire politician) =

American politician

Member of the U.S. House of Representatives from New Hampshire's at-large district (Seat 1)
- In office December 15, 1797 – March 3, 1799
- Preceded by: Jeremiah Smith
- Succeeded by: James Sheafe

Personal details
- Born: December 10, 1756 Rochester, Province of Massachusetts Bay, British America
- Died: April 20, 1800 (aged 43) Keene, New Hampshire, U.S.
- Party: Federalist
- Education: Harvard University, Dartmouth College
- Profession: Attorney

Peleg Sprague (December 10, 1756 – April 20, 1800) was a politician from the U.S. state of New Hampshire.

Sprague was born in Rochester in the Province of Massachusetts Bay. He clerked in a store in Littleton, attended Harvard College, and graduated from Dartmouth College, Hanover, New Hampshire, in 1783. He studied law, was admitted to the bar in 1785, and commenced practice in Winchendon, Massachusetts. He moved to Keene, New Hampshire, in 1787. He was selectman 1789–1791; county solicitor for Cheshire County in 1794; and member of the New Hampshire House of Representatives in 1797.

Sprague was elected as a Federalist Party to the 5th United States Congress to fill the vacancy caused by the resignation of Jeremiah Smith, serving from December 15, 1797, to March 3, 1799. He declined to be a candidate for renomination in 1798.

Sprague died in Keene, New Hampshire, and was interred there in the Washington Street Cemetery.

U.S. House of Representatives
Preceded by Jeremiah Smith	Member of the U.S. House of Representatives from New Hampshire's at-large congressional district 1797–1799	Succeeded by James Sheafe
