= James Davenport (Connecticut politician) =

American politician

Member of the U.S. House of Representatives from Connecticut's at-large district
- In office December 5, 1796 – August 3, 1797
- Preceded by: James Hillhouse
- Succeeded by: William Edmond

Member of the Connecticut Senate
- In office 1790-1797

Member of the Connecticut House of Representatives
- In office 1785-1790

Personal details
- Born: October 12, 1758 Stamford, Connecticut Colony, British America
- Died: August 3, 1797 (aged 38) Stamford, Connecticut, U.S.
- Citizenship: United States
- Party: Federalist
- Spouse(s): Abigail Fitch Davenport and Mehitable Coggshall Davenport
- Relations: James Davenport and John Davenport
- Children: Elizabeth Coggshall Davenport, Abigail Fitch Davenport, Mary Ann Davenport and Frances Louise Davenport
- Parent(s): Abraham Davenport and Elizabeth (Huntington) Davenport
- Education: Yale College
- Occupation: Lawyer, Judge, Politician

James Davenport (October 12, 1758 – August 3, 1797) was an eighteenth-century American lawyer, politician and judge. He served as a U.S. representative from Connecticut.

== Biography ==
Davenport was born in Stamford in the Connecticut Colony, the son of Abraham Davenport, and Elizabeth (Huntington) Davenport. He graduated from Yale College in 1777. He served in the commissary department of the Continental Army in the American Revolutionary War. He served as judge of the court of common pleas and was a member of the Connecticut House of Representatives from 1785 to 1790. Davenport served in the Connecticut State Senate from 1790 to 1797, and was a member of the Connecticut council of assistants from 1790 to 1796. He simultaneously served as a judge of the Connecticut Supreme Court of Errors from 1790 to 1797. He was also a candidate for the U.S. House of Representatives in 1790 and a 1793 special election.

He was a judge of the Fairfield County Court from 1792 until 1796. He was elected as a Federalist candidate to the Fourth Congress to fill the vacancy caused by the resignation of James Hillhouse, and was reelected to the Fifth Congress. Davenport served in Congress from December 5, 1796, until his death in Stamford on August 3, 1797.

== Personal life ==
Davenport married Abigail Fitch on May 7, 1780. They had one daughter together, Elizabeth Coggshall Davenport. Davenport married his second wife Mehitable Coggshall on November 6, 1790. Davenport had three daughters with Mehitable, Abigail Fitch Davenport, Mary Ann Davenport and Frances Louise Davenport.

Davenport's uncle, also named James Davenport, was a noted clergyman. Davenport's brother John Davenport also served in the United States Congress.

According to the 1790 Census, Davenport was the owner of 10 slaves, making him one of the largest slaveholders in Fairfield County at the time.

== See also ==
- List of members of the United States Congress who died in office (1790–1899)

U.S. House of Representatives
Preceded by James Hillhouse	Member of the U.S. House of Representatives from Connecticut's at-large congressional district 1796–1797	Succeeded by William Edmond
