= David Brooks (American politician) =

American politician

Member of the U.S. House of Representatives from New York's 5th district
- In office March 4, 1797 – March 4, 1799
- Preceded by: Theodorus Bailey
- Succeeded by: Theodorus Bailey

Member of the New York State Assembly
- In office 1787–1788; 1794–1796

Personal details
- Born: 1756 Philadelphia, Province of Pennsylvania, British America
- Died: August 30, 1838 (aged 81–82) Poughkeepsie, New York, U.S.
- Party: Federalist

David Brooks (1756 – August 30, 1838) was an officer in the Continental Army in the American Revolution and a United States representative from New York.

Brooks was born in Philadelphia in the Province of Pennsylvania and attended the public schools there. In 1776, he entered the Continental Army as a lieutenant. He was captured at Fort Washington on November 16, 1776. He was a prisoner-of-war for over three years, finally being exchanged in January 1780. As a parolee, he was not allowed in combat again, so he was appointed assistant clothier general.

During the 1780s, Brooks studied law, was admitted to the bar, and began practicing law. He was an original member of the Society of the Cincinnati upon its founding in 1783. He moved to New York County, New York (modern-day Manhattan) and was a member of the New York state assembly from 1787 to 1788. Brooks then moved to Dutchess County, New York and again was a member of the New York state assembly from 1794 to 1796. In 1795, Brooks was also made a judge of Dutchess County, a job he would keep until 1807 in spite of the fact that, at various times, he would be concurrently a state or federal legislator or a federal officer.

In 1796, Brooks was elected to the House of Representatives, serving from March 4, 1797, to March 4, 1799. He ran failed campaigns for reelection in 1798 and 1800.

In the 19th century, Brooks was appointed as a commissioner to negotiate a treaty with the Seneca people. In 1807, Brooks finally left his job as judge of Dutchess County to become clerk of Dutchess County, a job he held from June 5, 1807, to January 25, 1809, from February 9, 1810, to February 11, 1811, and again from February 23, 1813, to February 13, 1815. Brooks was also served on the New York state assembly again in 1810.

Brooks was later appointed an officer in the United States Custom Service. He died in Poughkeepsie, New York on August 30, 1838.

U.S. House of Representatives
Preceded by Theodorus Bailey	Member of the U.S. House of Representatives from New York's 5th congressional district 1797–1799	Succeeded by Theodorus Bailey
