= William Edmond =

American politician

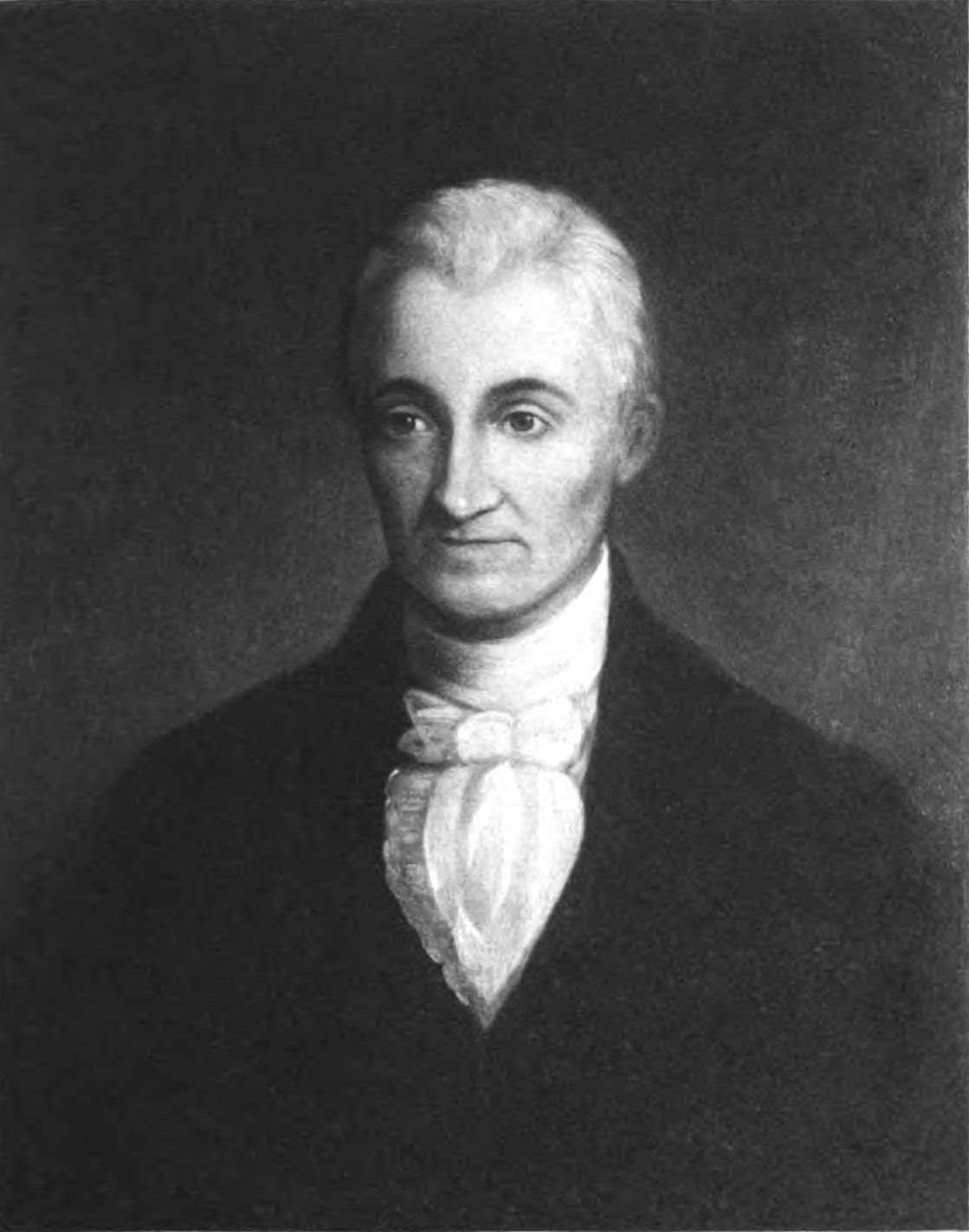

Member of the U.S. House of Representatives from Connecticut's at-large district
- In office November 13, 1797 – March 3, 1801
- Preceded by: James Davenport
- Succeeded by: Benjamin Tallmadge

Member of the Connecticut Senate
- In office 1797–1799

Member of the Connecticut House of Representatives
- In office 1802–1802
- In office 1801–1801
- In office 1791–1797

Personal details
- Born: September 28, 1755 Woodbury, Connecticut, British America
- Died: August 1, 1838 (aged 82) Newtown, Connecticut, U.S.
- Party: Federalist
- Education: Yale College

William Edmond (September 28, 1755 – August 1, 1838) was a United States representative from Connecticut. He was born in Woodbury, Connecticut and attended the common schools. He graduated from Yale College in 1778. He then served in the Revolutionary Army during the American Revolution. He studied law and was admitted to the bar in 1780 and commenced practice in Newtown, Connecticut.

Edmond was member of the Connecticut State House of Representatives 1791–1797, 1801, and 1802. He also served in the Connecticut Senate 1797–1799. He was elected as a Federalist to the Fifth Congress to fill the vacancy caused by the death of James Davenport and was reelected to the Sixth Congress and served from November 13, 1797, to March 3, 1801. He declined to be a candidate for renomination in 1800 and resumed the practice of law in Newtown. He served as an associate judge of the Connecticut Supreme Court 1805–1819. He retired to private life and continued the practice of law. He died in Newtown, Fairfield County, Connecticut on August 1, 1838, and was buried in Newtown Village Cemetery with his two wives, Elizabeth J. Chandler and Elizabeth Payne, and his children Mary E., Elizabeth, Sarah, William Payne, Ann M. and Robert Edmond Edmond, M.D.

His obituary from the Daily National Intelligencer (DC), Sep. 22, 1838, p. 3 reads, "DEATHS. At Newtown, Conn. Hon. WILLIAM EDMONDS, aged 83 years. The deceased was engaged in the Revolutionary war, in which he was wounded: he was admitted to the bar in 1780 : in 1798 he was elected a Representative in Congress, was re-elected in 1800, and at the commencement of the second session of that Congress he resigned his seat and returned to the practice of his profession, in which he continued with marked success until 1805, when he was elected one of the Judges of the Supreme Court. He continued to hold this office until the adoption of the Constitution of his State. The number of Judges was then reduced from nine to five, and the deceased, with several other members of the Court, retired to private life."

U.S. House of Representatives
Preceded by James Davenport	Member of the U.S. House of Representatives from Connecticut's at-large congressional district November 13, 1797 – March 3, 1801	Succeeded by Benjamin Tallmadge
