= 1796–97 United States House of Representatives elections =

House elections for the 5th U.S. Congress

- August 12, 1796 – October 15, 1797

All 106 seats in the United States House of Representatives 54 seats needed for a majority
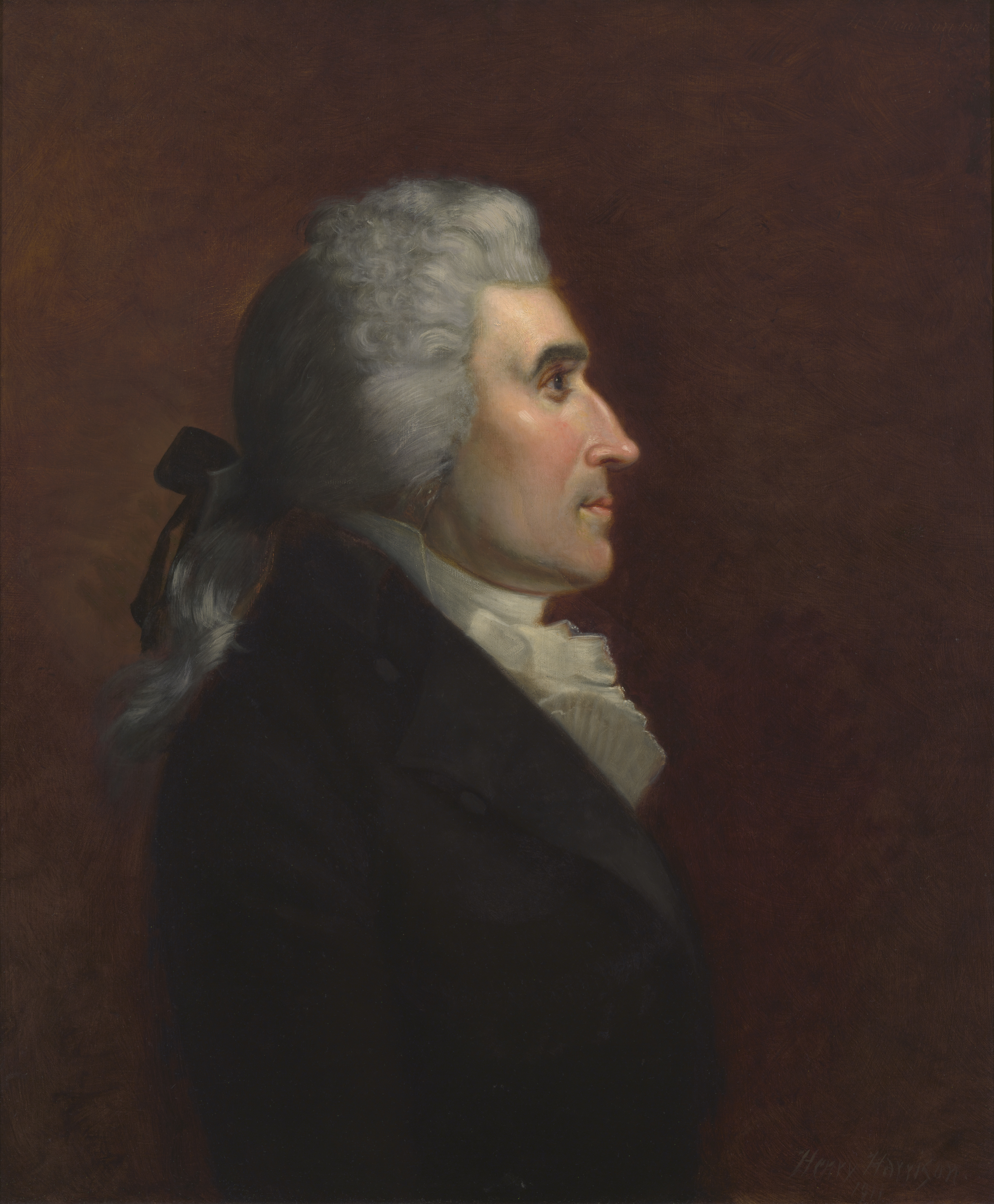

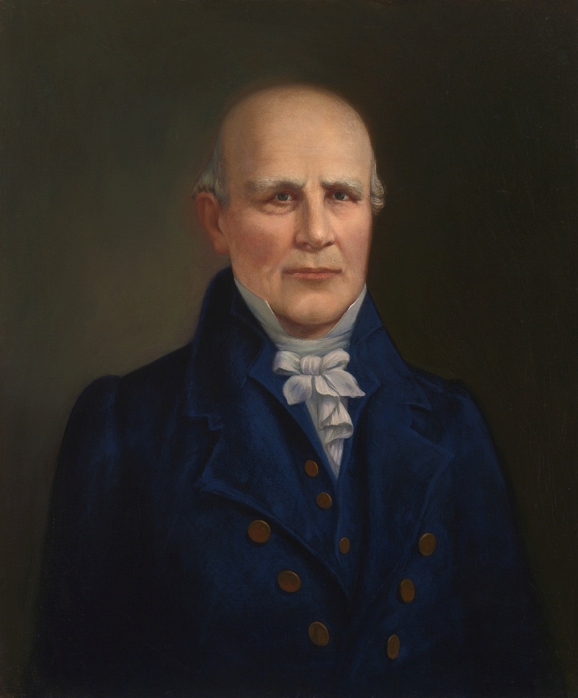
| | Majority party | Minority party |
|---|---|---|
| Leader | Jonathan Dayton | Nathaniel Macon |
| Party | Federalist | Democratic-Republican |
| Leader's seat | New Jersey at-large | North Carolina 5 |
| Last election | 47 seats | 59 seats |
| Seats won | 57 | 49 |
| Seat change | ▲10 | ▼10 |
- Results: Federalist hold Federalist gain Democratic-Republican hold Democratic-Republican gain Undistricted territory
Speaker before election
Jonathan Dayton
Federalist
Elected Speaker
Jonathan Dayton
Federalist

The 1796–97 United States House of Representatives elections took place in the various states between August 12, 1796 (in North Carolina), and October 15, 1797 (in Tennessee). Each state set its own date for its elections to the House of Representatives. The size of the House increased to 106 seats after Tennessee became the 16th U.S. state to join the union. The first session of the 5th United States Congress was convened on May 15, 1797, at the proclamation of the new President of the United States, John Adams. Since Kentucky and Tennessee had not yet voted, they were unrepresented until the second session began on November 13, 1797.

Gains for the Federalist Party provided the president with a reliable majority in support of his policies. Many of the Federalist pick-ups in Congress came from the former Middle Colonies (New York, Pennsylvania, New Jersey, and Delaware). New England remained heavily Federalist, whereas the South and West favored Democratic-Republican candidates. Federalist trade and infrastructure policies found widespread approval in the Mid-Atlantic states during this era. With the growth of cities in Maryland, Pennsylvania, and New York, government intervention in the interest of industrialization and mercantilism became more attractive to voting citizens in these areas.

During this period, each state fixed its own date for a congressional general election. Elections to a Congress took place both in the even-numbered year before and in the odd-numbered year when the Congress convened. In some states the congressional delegation was not elected until after the legal start of the Congress (on the 4th day of March in the odd-numbered year).

== Election summaries ==
During this period, each state fixed its own date for a congressional general election. Elections took place both in the even-numbered year before and in the odd-numbered year when a Congress convened. In some states, the congressional delegation was not elected until after the legal start of the Congress (on the 4th day of March in the odd-numbered year). The 1st session of the 5th Congress ran May 15 – July 10, 1797, before the states of Kentucky and Tennessee had their elections, causing those states to be unrepresented in the 1st session.

↓
| 49 | 57 |
| Democratic-Republican | Federalist |

| State | Type | ↑ Date | Total seats | Democratic- Republican | | Federalist | |
| State | Type | ↑ Date | Total seats | Seats | Change | Seats | Change |
Regular elections
| North Carolina | Districts | August 12, 1796 | 10 | 9 | Steady | 1 | Steady |
| New Hampshire | At-large | August 29, 1796 (Note: New Hampshire law required a majority for election, requiring an additional ballot on November 7, 1796.) | 4 | 0 | ▼1 | 4 | ▲1 |
| Rhode Island | At-large | August 30, 1796 | 2 | 0 | Steady | 2 | Steady |
| Vermont | Districts | September 9, 1796 (Note: Vermont law required a majority for election, requiring additional ballots on December 11, 1796 and February 7, 1797.) | 2 | 1 | Steady | 1 | Steady |
| Connecticut | At-large | September 19, 1796 | 7 | 0 | Steady | 7 | Steady |
| Maryland | Districts | October 3, 1796 | 8 | 2 | ▼2 | 6 | ▲2 |
| Delaware | At-large | October 4, 1796 | 1 | 0 | ▼1 | 1 | ▲1 |
| Pennsylvania | Districts | October 11, 1796 | 13 | 7 | ▼2 | 6 | ▲2 |
| South Carolina | Districts | October 11, 1796 | 6 | 3 | ▼1 | 3 | ▲1 |
| Georgia | At-large | November 7, 1796 | 2 | 2 | Steady | 0 | Steady |
| Massachusetts | Districts | November 7, 1796 (Note: Massachusetts law required a majority for election, requiring additional ballots on January 16, 1797 and April 3, 1797.) | 14 | 3 | Steady | 11 | Steady |
| New York | Districts | December 15, 1796 | 10 | 4 | ▼1 | 6 | ▲1 |
| New Jersey | At-large | January 11, 1797 | 5 | 0 | Steady | 5 | Steady |
Late elections (after the March 4, 1797 start of Congress)
| Virginia | Districts | March 20, 1797 | 19 | 15 | ▼2 | 4 | ▲2 |
| Kentucky | Districts | September 2, 1797 | 2 | 2 | Steady | 0 | Steady |
| Tennessee | At-large | October 15, 1797 | 1 | 1 | Steady | 0 | Steady |
| Total | | | 106 | 49 46.2% | ▼10 | 57 53.8% | ▲10 |

House seats
| Democratic-Republican | 46.23% |
| Federalist | 53.77% |

== Change in composition ==
| Federalist | Democratic-Republican | Vacant |

=== End of the 4th Congress ===
| Democratic-Republican → | | | | | | | DE‑AL | GA‑AL | GA‑AL | KY‑1 | KY‑2 | MD‑2 | MD‑4 | MD‑5 | MD‑6 | MA‑1 | MA‑2 | MA‑9 | MA‑12 |
| PA‑6 | PA‑5 | PA‑2 | PA‑1 | NC‑10 | NC‑9 | NC‑8 | NC‑6 | NC‑5 | NC‑3 | NC‑2 | NC‑1 | NY‑9 | NY‑5 | NY‑4 | NY‑3 | NY‑2 | NY‑1 | NJ‑AL | NH‑AL |
| PA‑9 | PA‑10 | PA‑11 | PA‑12 | SC‑2 | SC‑3 | SC‑4 | SC‑5 | TN‑AL | VT‑1 | VA‑1 | VA‑2 | VA‑3 | VA‑4 | VA‑6 | VA‑7 | VA‑8 | VA‑9 | VA‑10 | VA‑12 |
| Majority → | | | | | | | | | | | | | | | | | | | VA‑14 |
| NC‑4 | NC‑7 | PA‑3 | PA‑4 | PA‑7 | PA‑8 | RI‑AL | RI‑AL | SC‑1 | SC‑6 | VT‑2 | VA‑5 | VA‑11 | PA‑4 | VA‑13 | VA‑17 | VA‑19 | VA‑18 | VA‑16 | VA‑15 |
| NY‑10 | NY‑8 | NY‑7 | NY‑6 | NJ‑AL | NJ‑AL | NJ‑AL | NJ‑AL | NH‑AL | NH‑AL | NH‑AL | MA‑14 | MA‑13 | MA‑11 | MA‑10 | MA‑8 | MA‑7 | MA‑6 | MA‑5 | MA‑4 |
| Federalist → | | | | | | | | CT‑AL | CT‑AL | CT‑AL | CT‑AL | CT‑AL | CT‑AL | CT‑AL | MD‑1 | MD‑3 | MD‑7 | MD‑8 | MA‑3 |

=== Beginning of the 5th Congress ===
| Democratic-Republican → | | | | | | | GA‑AL | GA‑AL | KY‑1 | KY‑2 | MD‑2 | MD‑5 | MA‑1 | MA‑5 | MA‑9 | NY‑1 | NY‑2 | NY‑3 | NY‑4 |
| TN‑AL | SC‑6 | SC‑4 | SC‑3 | PA‑12 | PA‑11 | PA‑10 | PA‑9 | PA‑4 | PA‑2 | PA‑1 | NC‑10 | NC‑9 | NC‑8 | NC‑6 | NC‑5 | NC‑4 | NC‑3 | NC‑2 | NC‑1 |
| VT‑1 | VA‑2 | VA‑4 | VA‑5 | VA‑6 | VA‑7 | VA‑8 | VA‑9 | VA‑10 | VA‑13 | VA‑14 | VA‑17 | VA‑19 | VA‑18 | VA‑16 | VA‑15 | VT‑2 | RI‑AL | RI‑AL | VA‑12 |
| Majority → | | | | | | | | | | | | | | | | | | | VA‑11 |
| NJ‑AL | NJ‑AL | NY‑5 | NY‑6 | NY‑7 | NY‑8 | NY‑9 | NY‑10 | NC‑7 | PA‑3 | PA‑4 | PA‑5 | PA‑6 | PA‑7 | PA‑8 | SC‑5 | SC‑2 | SC‑1 | VA‑1 | VA‑3 |
| NJ‑AL | NJ‑AL | NJ‑AL | NH‑AL | NH‑AL | NH‑AL | NH‑AL | MA‑14 | MA‑13 | MA‑12 | MA‑11 | MA‑10 | MA‑8 | MA‑7 | MA‑6 | MA‑4 | MA‑3 | MA‑2 | MD‑8 | MD‑7 |
| Federalist → | | | | | | | | CT‑AL | CT‑AL | CT‑AL | CT‑AL | CT‑AL | CT‑AL | CT‑AL | DE‑AL | MD‑1 | MD‑3 | MD‑4 | MD‑6 |

== Special elections ==
Elections are sorted by election date, then by district.

=== Fourth Congress ===
There were special and late elections to the 4th Congress in 1796.

| District | Incumbent | | | This race | |
| District | Member | Party | First elected | Results | Candidates |
|---|---|---|---|---|---|
| Maryland 2 | Gabriel Duvall | Democratic- Republican | 1794 (special) | Incumbent resigned March 28, 1796, having been elected judge of the Supreme Court of Maryland. New member elected April 18, 1796 and seated May 5, 1796. (Note: Date cited is the election date, but the new member in some cases "took" the seat on a later date.); Democratic-Republican hold. Winner was later elected to the next term; see below. | ▌ ✓ Richard Sprigg Jr. (Democratic-Republican); Unopposed |
| Massachusetts 10 | Benjamin Goodhue | Federalist | 1789 | Incumbent resigned in June 1796 to become a U.S. Senator. New member elected September 12, 1796 and seated December 7, 1796. Federalist hold. Winner was later elected to the next term; see below. | First ballot (August 1, 1796): ▌Samuel Sewall (Federalist) 31.9%; ▌Jonathan Ingersoll (Unknown) 22.5%; ▌John Morris (Unknown) 21.2%; ▌John Cabot (Unknown) 10.5%; ▌Samuel Holten (Federalist) 6.8%; ▌Elias H. Dooly (Unknown) 4.0%; Scattering 3.1%; Second ballot (September 12, 1796): ▌ ✓ Samuel Sewall (Federalist) 61.7%; ▌Loammi Baldwin (Federalist) 38.3% |
| Connecticut at-large | James Hillhouse | Federalist | 1790 | Incumbent resigned July 1, 1796 to become U.S. Senator. New member elected September 19, 1796 and seated December 5, 1796. Federalist hold. On the same day, winner lost election to the next term; see below. | ▌ ✓ James Davenport (Federalist); [data missing] |
| Maryland 3 | Jeremiah Crabb | Federalist | 1794 | Incumbent resigned in 1796. New member elected October 3, 1796 and seated December 5, 1796. Federalist hold. On the same ballot, winner was elected to the next term; see below. | ▌ ✓ William Craik (Federalist) 50.7%; ▌Benjamin Edwards (Federalist) 49.3% |
| Pennsylvania 5 | Daniel Hiester | Democratic- Republican | 1788 | Incumbent resigned July 1, 1796. New member elected October 11, 1796 and seated December 8, 1796. Federalist gain. | ▌ ✓ George Ege (Federalist) 56.8%; ▌Joseph Hiester (Democratic-Republican) 45.2% |
| Tennessee at-large | None (District created) | | | New state admitted June 1, 1796. New member elected October 15, 1796 and seated December 5, 1796. Democratic-Republican gain. | ▌ ✓ Andrew Jackson (Democratic-Republican) 98.9%; ▌James Rody (Unknown) 1.1% |
| Rhode Island at-large | Benjamin Bourne | Federalist | 1790 (late ratification) | Incumbent resigned in 1796 to become a U.S. district judge. New member elected November 15, 1796 and seated December 19, 1796. Federalist hold. Winner was also elected to the next term; see below. | ▌ ✓ Elisha Reynolds Potter (Federalist) 71.0%; ▌Peleg Arnold (Democratic-Republican) 29.0% |
| Massachusetts 1 | Theodore Sedgwick | Federalist | 1789 | Incumbent resigned in June 1796, having been elected U.S. Senator. New member elected November 21, 1796 and seated January 27, 1797. Democratic-Republican gain. | First ballot (September 5, 1796): ▌Thomson J. Skinner (Democratic-Republican) 48.0%; ▌Ephraim Williams (Federalist) 49.9%; Scattering 2.1%; Second ballot (November 21, 1796); ▌ ✓ Thomson J. Skinner (Democratic-Republican) 62.7%; ▌Ephraim Williams (Federalist) 32.0%; Scattering 5.3% |
| North Carolina 4 | Absalom Tatom | Democratic- Republican | 1795 | Incumbent resigned June 1, 1796. New member elected November 28, 1796 and seated December 13, 1796. Federalist gain. Winner did not run for the next term. | ▌ ✓ William F. Strudwick (Federalist) 76.3%; ▌Richard Stanford (Democratic-Republican) 22.5%; Scattering 1.2% |
| Connecticut at-large | Uriah Tracy | Federalist | 1792 | Incumbent resigned October 13, 1796 to become U.S. Senator. New member elected December 5, 1796 and seated January 3, 1797. Federalist hold. Winner had already been elected to the next term; see below. | ▌ ✓ Samuel Dana (Federalist); [data missing] |

=== Fifth Congress ===
There were special and late elections to the 5th Congress in 1797.

| District | Incumbent | | | This race | |
| District | Member | Party | First elected | Results | Candidates |
|---|---|---|---|---|---|
| Vermont 2 | Daniel Buck | Federalist | 1795 | Incumbent re-elected, but declined to serve. New member elected May 23, 1797. Federalist hold. | ▌ ✓ Lewis R. Morris (Federalist) 56.9%; ▌Stephen Jacob (Federalist) 13.6%; ▌Nathaniel Niles (Democratic-Republican) 11.2%; ▌Amasa Paine (Federalist) 6.6%; Scattering 11.8% |
| Massachusetts 11 | Theophilus Bradbury | Federalist | 1794/95 | Incumbent resigned July 24, 1797. New member elected August 4, 1797 and seated November 27, 1797. Federalist hold. | ▌ ✓ Bailey Bartlett (Federalist) 81.4%; Scattering 18.6% |
| New Hampshire at-large | Jeremiah Smith | Federalist | 1794 | Incumbent resigned July 26, 1797. New member elected August 28, 1797 and seated December 15, 1797. Federalist hold. | First ballot (August 28, 1797): ▌Peleg Sprague (Federalist) 43.3%; ▌Woodbury Langdon (Democratic-Republican) 22.5%; ▌Edward Livermore (Federalist) 21.3%; Others 12.8%; Second ballot (October 30, 1797): ▌ ✓ Peleg Sprague (Federalist) 66.6%; ▌Woodbury Langdon (Democratic-Republican) 33.4% |
| Rhode Island at-large | Elisha Potter | Federalist | 1796 (special) | Incumbent resigned sometime in 1797. New member elected August 29, 1797 and seated November 13, 1797. Federalist hold. | ▌ ✓ Thomas Tillinghast (Federalist) (Note: Source mistakenly gives party as Democratic-Republican; Tillinghast did later become a Democratic-Republican, but in the 5th Congress, he was a Federalist) 78.3%; ▌James Burrill Jr. (Federalist) 18.1%; Scattering 3.6% |
| South Carolina 1 | William L. Smith | Federalist | 1788 | Incumbent resigned July 10, 1797. New member elected September 4–5, 1797 and seated November 23, 1797. Federalist hold. | ▌ ✓ Thomas Pinckney (Federalist); Unopposed |
| Connecticut at-large | James Davenport | Federalist | 1796 (special) | Died August 3, 1797. New member elected September 18, 1797 and seated November 13, 1797. Federalist hold. | ▌ ✓ William Edmond (Federalist) 56.3%; ▌John Treadwell (Federalist) 24.8%; ▌Gideon Granger (Democratic-Republican) 16.1%; ▌David Daggett (Federalist) 2.8% |
| Tennessee at-large | Andrew Jackson | Democratic- Republican | 1797 (new state) | Incumbent resigned in September 1797 when elected U.S. Senator. New member elected September 26, 1797 and seated November 23, 1797, despite being under the minimum age for service. Democratic-Republican hold. | ▌ ✓ William C. C. Claiborne (Democratic-Republican); ▌John Rhea (Unknown); ▌John Carter (Unknown) |
| Pennsylvania 5 | George Ege | Federalist | 1796 (special) | Incumbent resigned in October 1797. New member elected October 10, 1797 and seated December 1, 1797. Democratic-Republican gain. | ▌ ✓ Joseph Hiester (Democratic-Republican); Unopposed |

== Connecticut ==
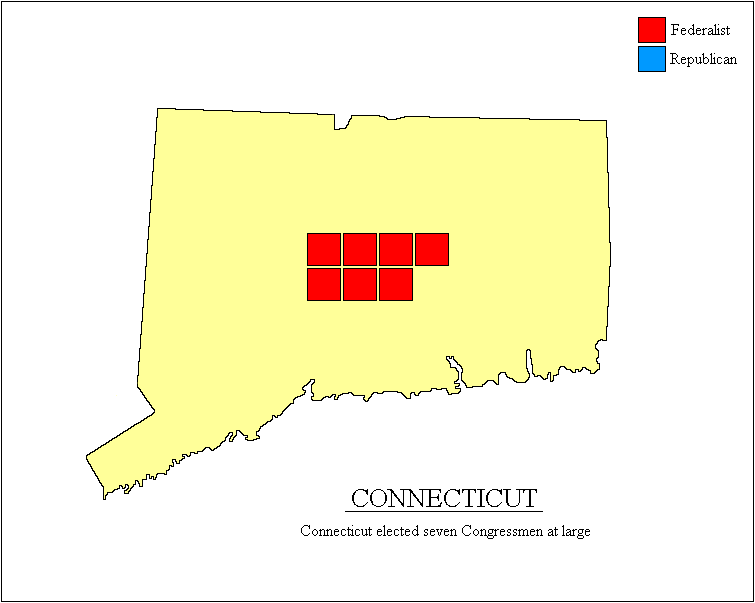
Connecticut's results

Connecticut elected its seven representatives at-large on a general ticket.

| District | Incumbent | | | This race | |
| District | Member | Party | First elected | Results | Candidates |
|---|---|---|---|---|---|
| Connecticut at-large 7 seats on a general ticket | Uriah Tracy | Federalist | 1792 | Incumbent re-elected. Winner declined to serve. | ▌ ✓ Uriah Tracy (Federalist) 13.8%; ▌ ✓ Roger Griswold (Federalist) 13.3%; ▌ ✓ Joshua Coit (Federalist) 12.1%; ▌ ✓ Zephaniah Swift (Federalist) 12.0%; ▌ ✓ Nathaniel Smith (Federalist) 11.9%; ▌ ✓ Chauncey Goodrich (Federalist) 9.7%; ▌ ✓ Samuel W. Dana (Federalist) 7.5%; ▌James Davenport (Federalist) 6.2%; ▌David Daggett (Federalist) 4.7%; ▌John Allen (Federalist) 3.3%; ▌William Edmond (Federalist) 3.3%; ▌Jonathan Treadwell 2.6%; ▌Gideon Granger (Democratic-Republican) 2.2% |
| Connecticut at-large 7 seats on a general ticket | Roger Griswold | Federalist | 1794 | Incumbent re-elected. | ▌ ✓ Uriah Tracy (Federalist) 13.8%; ▌ ✓ Roger Griswold (Federalist) 13.3%; ▌ ✓ Joshua Coit (Federalist) 12.1%; ▌ ✓ Zephaniah Swift (Federalist) 12.0%; ▌ ✓ Nathaniel Smith (Federalist) 11.9%; ▌ ✓ Chauncey Goodrich (Federalist) 9.7%; ▌ ✓ Samuel W. Dana (Federalist) 7.5%; ▌James Davenport (Federalist) 6.2%; ▌David Daggett (Federalist) 4.7%; ▌John Allen (Federalist) 3.3%; ▌William Edmond (Federalist) 3.3%; ▌Jonathan Treadwell 2.6%; ▌Gideon Granger (Democratic-Republican) 2.2% |
| Connecticut at-large 7 seats on a general ticket | Joshua Coit | Federalist | 1792 | Incumbent re-elected. | ▌ ✓ Uriah Tracy (Federalist) 13.8%; ▌ ✓ Roger Griswold (Federalist) 13.3%; ▌ ✓ Joshua Coit (Federalist) 12.1%; ▌ ✓ Zephaniah Swift (Federalist) 12.0%; ▌ ✓ Nathaniel Smith (Federalist) 11.9%; ▌ ✓ Chauncey Goodrich (Federalist) 9.7%; ▌ ✓ Samuel W. Dana (Federalist) 7.5%; ▌James Davenport (Federalist) 6.2%; ▌David Daggett (Federalist) 4.7%; ▌John Allen (Federalist) 3.3%; ▌William Edmond (Federalist) 3.3%; ▌Jonathan Treadwell 2.6%; ▌Gideon Granger (Democratic-Republican) 2.2% |
| Connecticut at-large 7 seats on a general ticket | Zephariah Swift | Federalist | 1792 | Incumbent re-elected. Winner declined to serve. | ▌ ✓ Uriah Tracy (Federalist) 13.8%; ▌ ✓ Roger Griswold (Federalist) 13.3%; ▌ ✓ Joshua Coit (Federalist) 12.1%; ▌ ✓ Zephaniah Swift (Federalist) 12.0%; ▌ ✓ Nathaniel Smith (Federalist) 11.9%; ▌ ✓ Chauncey Goodrich (Federalist) 9.7%; ▌ ✓ Samuel W. Dana (Federalist) 7.5%; ▌James Davenport (Federalist) 6.2%; ▌David Daggett (Federalist) 4.7%; ▌John Allen (Federalist) 3.3%; ▌William Edmond (Federalist) 3.3%; ▌Jonathan Treadwell 2.6%; ▌Gideon Granger (Democratic-Republican) 2.2% |
| Connecticut at-large 7 seats on a general ticket | Nathaniel Smith | Federalist | 1795 (special) | Incumbent re-elected. | ▌ ✓ Uriah Tracy (Federalist) 13.8%; ▌ ✓ Roger Griswold (Federalist) 13.3%; ▌ ✓ Joshua Coit (Federalist) 12.1%; ▌ ✓ Zephaniah Swift (Federalist) 12.0%; ▌ ✓ Nathaniel Smith (Federalist) 11.9%; ▌ ✓ Chauncey Goodrich (Federalist) 9.7%; ▌ ✓ Samuel W. Dana (Federalist) 7.5%; ▌James Davenport (Federalist) 6.2%; ▌David Daggett (Federalist) 4.7%; ▌John Allen (Federalist) 3.3%; ▌William Edmond (Federalist) 3.3%; ▌Jonathan Treadwell 2.6%; ▌Gideon Granger (Democratic-Republican) 2.2% |
| Connecticut at-large 7 seats on a general ticket | Chauncey Goodrich | Federalist | 1794 | Incumbent re-elected. | ▌ ✓ Uriah Tracy (Federalist) 13.8%; ▌ ✓ Roger Griswold (Federalist) 13.3%; ▌ ✓ Joshua Coit (Federalist) 12.1%; ▌ ✓ Zephaniah Swift (Federalist) 12.0%; ▌ ✓ Nathaniel Smith (Federalist) 11.9%; ▌ ✓ Chauncey Goodrich (Federalist) 9.7%; ▌ ✓ Samuel W. Dana (Federalist) 7.5%; ▌James Davenport (Federalist) 6.2%; ▌David Daggett (Federalist) 4.7%; ▌John Allen (Federalist) 3.3%; ▌William Edmond (Federalist) 3.3%; ▌Jonathan Treadwell 2.6%; ▌Gideon Granger (Democratic-Republican) 2.2% |
| Connecticut at-large 7 seats on a general ticket | James Hillhouse | Federalist | 1790 | Incumbent resigned July 1, 1796. Federalist hold. | ▌ ✓ Uriah Tracy (Federalist) 13.8%; ▌ ✓ Roger Griswold (Federalist) 13.3%; ▌ ✓ Joshua Coit (Federalist) 12.1%; ▌ ✓ Zephaniah Swift (Federalist) 12.0%; ▌ ✓ Nathaniel Smith (Federalist) 11.9%; ▌ ✓ Chauncey Goodrich (Federalist) 9.7%; ▌ ✓ Samuel W. Dana (Federalist) 7.5%; ▌James Davenport (Federalist) 6.2%; ▌David Daggett (Federalist) 4.7%; ▌John Allen (Federalist) 3.3%; ▌William Edmond (Federalist) 3.3%; ▌Jonathan Treadwell 2.6%; ▌Gideon Granger (Democratic-Republican) 2.2% |

== Delaware ==
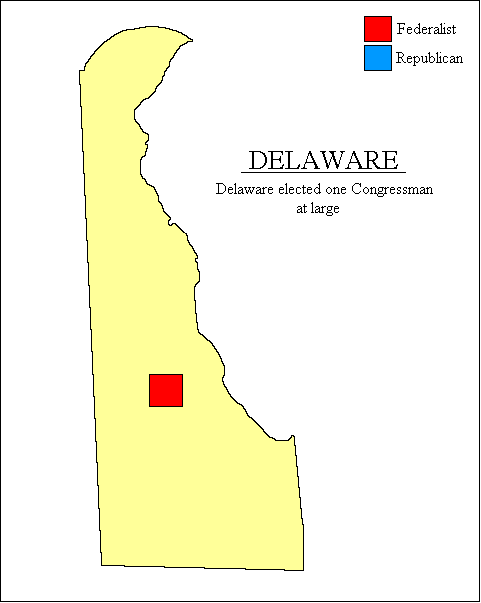
Delaware's result

| District | Incumbent | | | This race | |
| District | Member | Party | First elected | Results | Candidates |
|---|---|---|---|---|---|
| Delaware at-large | John Patten | Democratic- Republican | 1794 | Incumbent retired. Federalist gain. | ▌ ✓ James A. Bayard (Federalist) 56.3%; ▌William Perry (Democratic-Republican) 43.7% |

== Georgia ==
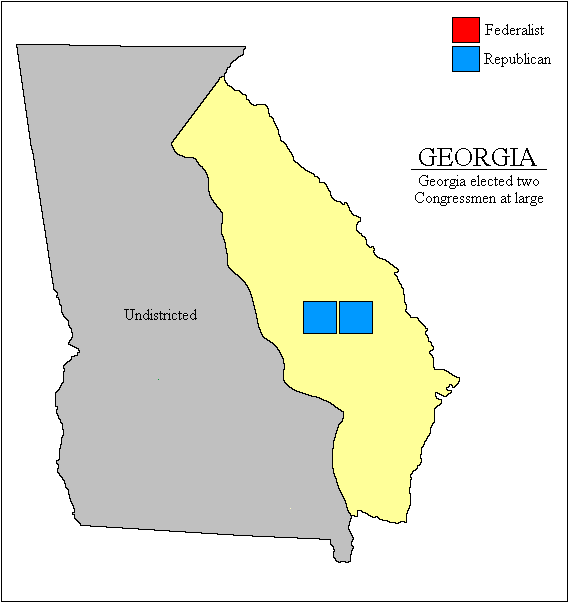
Georgia's results

| District | Incumbent | | | This race | |
| District | Member | Party | First elected | Results | Candidates |
|---|---|---|---|---|---|
| Georgia at-large 2 seats on a general ticket | Abraham Baldwin | Democratic- Republican | 1789 | Incumbent re-elected. | ▌ ✓ Abraham Baldwin (Democratic-Republican) 35.8%; ▌ ✓ John Milledge (Democratic-Republican) 33.1%; ▌Thomas P. Carnes (Federalist) 18.7%; ▌Francis Willis (Democratic-Republican) 10.5%; ▌George Nailor (Democratic-Republican) 1.8% |
| Georgia at-large 2 seats on a general ticket | John Milledge | Democratic- Republican | 1794 | Incumbent re-elected. | ▌ ✓ Abraham Baldwin (Democratic-Republican) 35.8%; ▌ ✓ John Milledge (Democratic-Republican) 33.1%; ▌Thomas P. Carnes (Federalist) 18.7%; ▌Francis Willis (Democratic-Republican) 10.5%; ▌George Nailor (Democratic-Republican) 1.8% |

== Kentucky ==
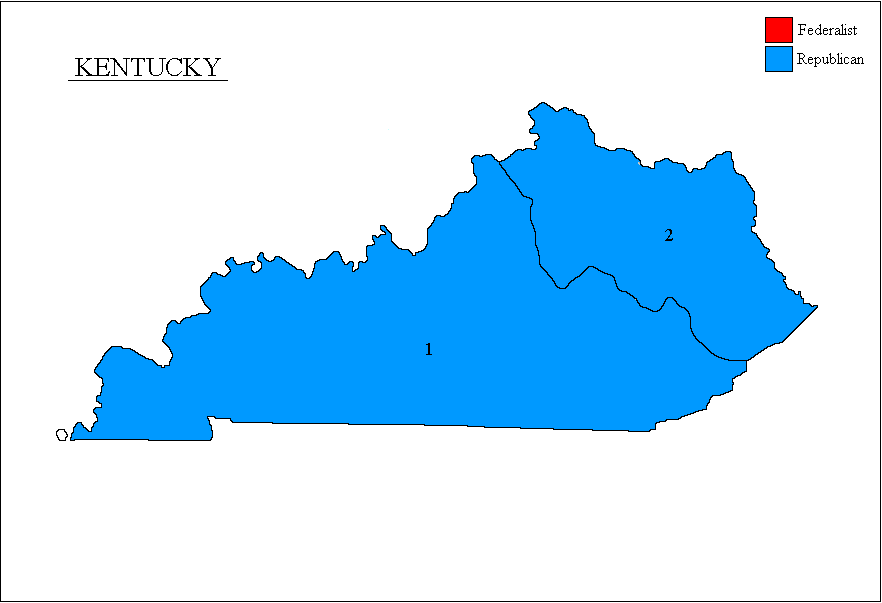
Kentucky's results by district

| District | Incumbent | | | This race | |
| District | Member | Party | First elected | Results | Candidates |
|---|---|---|---|---|---|
| Kentucky 1 "Southern District" | Christopher Greenup | Democratic- Republican | 1792 | Incumbent retired. Democratic-Republican hold. | ▌ ✓ Thomas Davis (Democratic-Republican) 100% |
| Kentucky 2 "Northern District" | Alexander D. Orr | Democratic- Republican | 1792 | Incumbent retired. Democratic-Republican hold. | ▌ ✓ John Fowler (Democratic-Republican) (Note: Source does not give numbers of votes or has incomplete data); ▌Notley Conn (Unknown); ▌Edmund Bullock (Unknown) |

== Maryland ==
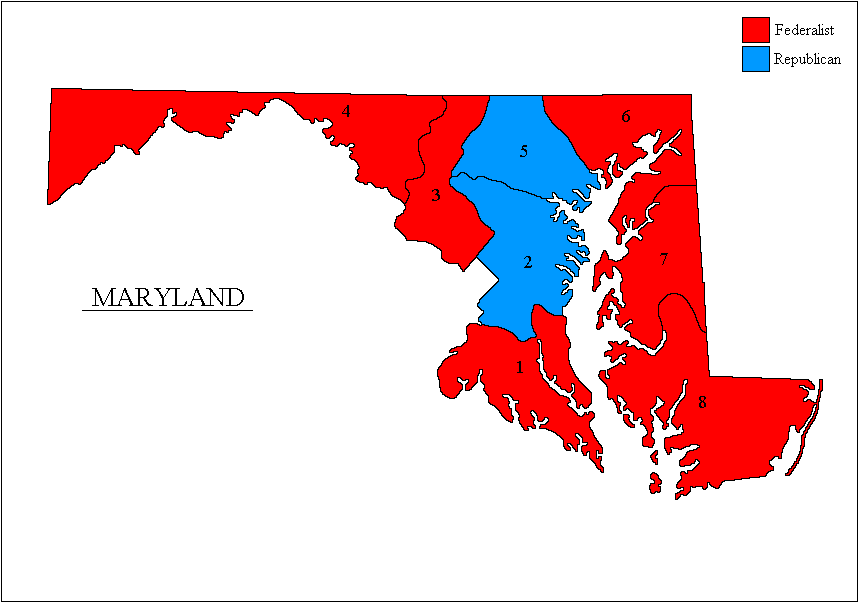
Maryland's results by district

Two of the four Democratic-Republicans were replaced by Federalists, bringing the Federalists from a 4–4 split to a 6–2 majority.

| District | Incumbent | | | This race | |
| District | Member | Party | First elected | Results | Candidates |
|---|---|---|---|---|---|
| Maryland 1 | George Dent | Federalist | 1792 | Incumbent re-elected. | ▌ ✓ George Dent (Federalist) 99.7%; ▌Philip Key (Unknown) 0.3% |
| Maryland 2 | Richard Sprigg Jr. | Democratic-Republican | 1796 (special) | Incumbent re-elected. | ▌ ✓ Richard Sprigg Jr. (Democratic-Republican) 100% |
| Maryland 3 | William Craik | Federalist | 1796 (special) | Incumbent re-elected. | ▌ ✓ William Craik (Federalist) 51.0%; ▌Benjamin Edwards (Federalist) 49.0% |
| Maryland 4 | Thomas Sprigg | Democratic-Republican | 1792 | Incumbent retired. Federalist gain. | ▌ ✓ George Baer Jr. (Federalist) 72.1%; ▌Samuel Ringgold (Democratic-Republican) 27.9% |
| Maryland 5 | Samuel Smith | Democratic-Republican | 1792 | Incumbent re-elected. | ▌ ✓ Samuel Smith (Democratic-Republican) 100% |
| Maryland 6 | Gabriel Christie | Democratic-Republican | 1792 | Incumbent lost re-election. Federalist gain. | ▌ ✓ William Matthews (Federalist) 51.5%; ▌Gabriel Christie (Democratic-Republican) 48.5% |
| Maryland 7 | William Hindman | Federalist | 1792 | Incumbent re-elected. | ▌ ✓ William Hindman (Federalist) 62.6%; ▌Robert Wright (Democratic-Republican) 37.4% |
| Maryland 8 | William V. Murray | Federalist | 1790 | Incumbent retired. Federalist hold. | ▌ ✓ John Dennis (Federalist) 100% |

== Massachusetts ==
Massachusetts's results
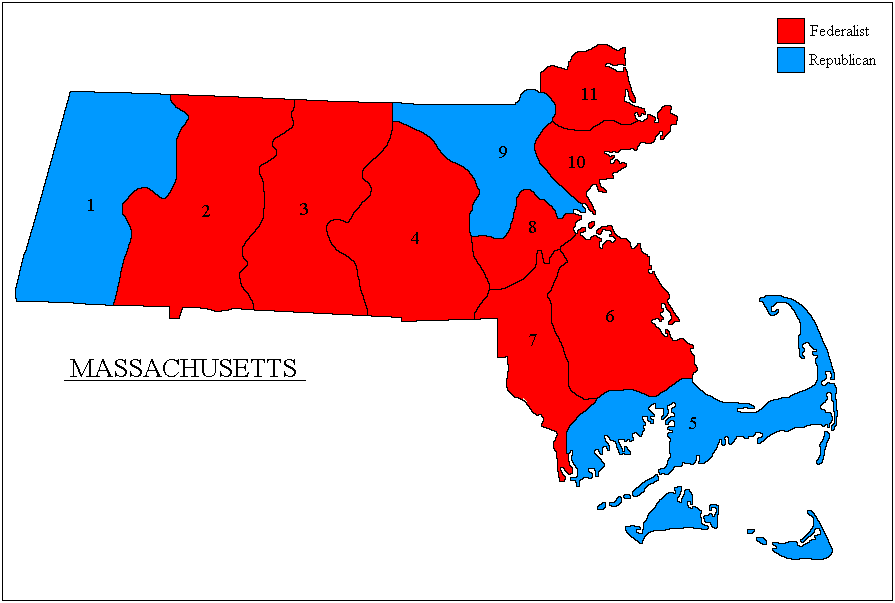
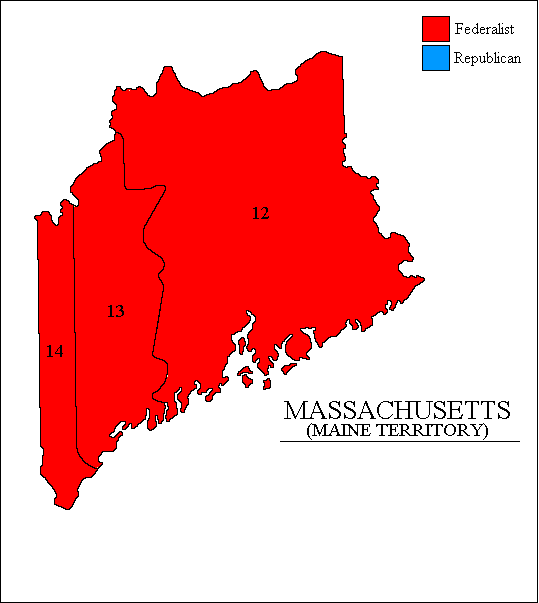

Massachusetts's electoral law required a majority for election, necessitating additional trials in three districts.

| District | Incumbent | | | This race | |
| District | Member | Party | First elected | Results | Candidates |
|---|---|---|---|---|---|
| Massachusetts 1 "1st Western District" | Vacant | | | Incumbent rep.-elect Theodore Sedgwick (F) resigned in June 1796 to become U.S. Senator. Democratic-Republican gain. New member also elected to finish the term on a later ballot; see above. | ▌ ✓ Thomson J. Skinner (Democratic-Republican) 56.4%; ▌Ephraim Williams (Federalist) 43.6% |
| Massachusetts 2 "2nd Western District" | William Lyman | Democratic- Republican | 1792 | Incumbent lost re-election. Federalist gain. | First ballot (November 7, 1796): ▌William Shepard (Federalist) 46.3%; ▌Sam Hinshaw (Unknown) 23.9%; ▌William Lyman (Democratic-Republican) 21.4%; ▌John Williams (Unknown) 4.0%; ▌Nahum Park (Unknown) 2.0%; Scattering 2.4%; Second ballot (January 16, 1797); ▌ ✓ William Shepard (Federalist) 100% |
| Massachusetts 3 "3rd Western District" | Samuel Lyman | Federalist | 1794 | Incumbent re-elected. | ▌ ✓ Samuel Lyman (Federalist) 83.3%; ▌Daniel Bigelow (Democratic-Republican) 16.7% |
| Massachusetts 4 "4th Western District" | Dwight Foster | Federalist | 1792 | Incumbent re-elected. | ▌ ✓ Dwight Foster (Federalist) 80.8%; ▌Levi Lincoln Sr. (Democratic-Republican) 19.2% |
| Massachusetts 5 "1st Southern District" | Nathaniel Freeman | Federalist | 1794 | Incumbent switched parties and was re-elected. Democratic-Republican gain. | ▌ ✓ Nathaniel Freeman (Democratic-Republican) 82.1%; ▌Peleg Coffin Jr. (Federalist) 17.9% |
| Massachusetts 6 "2nd Southern District" | John Reed Sr. | Federalist | 1794 | Incumbent re-elected. | ▌ ✓ John Reed Sr. (Federalist) 78.8%; ▌Edward H. Robbins (Federalist) 21.2% |
| Massachusetts 7 "3rd Southern District" | George Leonard | Federalist | 1788; 1794 | Incumbent retired. Federalist hold. | First ballot (November 7, 1796): ▌Elisha May (Federalist) 45.3%; ▌Stephen Bullock (Federalist) 28.3%; ▌Laban Wheaton (Federalist) 26.4%; Second ballot (January 16, 1797): ▌Stephen Bullock (Federalist) 35.8%; ▌Laban Wheaton (Federalist) 32.7%; ▌Elisha May (Federalist) 31.5%; Third ballot (April 3, 1797): ▌ ✓ Stephen Bullock (Federalist) 56.7%; ▌Elisha May (Federalist) 28.3%; ▌Laban Wheaton (Federalist) 15.1% |
| Massachusetts 8 "1st Middle District" | Fisher Ames | Federalist | 1788 | Incumbent retired. Federalist hold. | ▌ ✓ Harrison Gray Otis (Federalist) 57.0%; ▌James Bowdoin (Democratic-Republican) 43.0% |
| Massachusetts 9 "2nd Middle District" | Joseph Varnum | Democratic- Republican | 1794 | Incumbent re-elected. | ▌ ✓ Joseph Varnum (Democratic-Republican) 69.0%; ▌Ebenezer Bridge (Federalist) 16.8%; ▌Samuel Dexter (Federalist) 14.3% |
| Massachusetts 10 "3rd Middle District" | Samuel Sewall | Federalist | 1796 (special) | Incumbent re-elected. | ▌ ✓ Samuel Sewall (Federalist) 67.9%; ▌Loammi Baldwin (Federalist) 22.1% |
| Massachusetts 11 "4th Middle District" | Theophilus Bradbury | Federalist | 1794 | Incumbent re-elected. | ▌ ✓ Theophilus Bradbury (Federalist) 100% |
| Massachusetts 12 District of Maine "1st Eastern District" | Henry Dearborn | Democratic- Republican | 1792 | Incumbent lost re-election. Federalist gain. | First ballot (November 7, 1796): ▌Isaac Parker (Federalist) 40.5%; ▌Henry Dearborn (Democratic-Republican) 31.7%; ▌John Bowman (Unknown) 27.8%; Second ballot (January 16, 1797): ▌Isaac Parker (Federalist) 48.2%; ▌Henry Dearborn (Democratic-Republican) 33.8%; ▌John Bowman (Unknown) 18.0%; Third ballot (April 3, 1797); ▌ ✓ Isaac Parker (Federalist) 52.6%; ▌Henry Dearborn (Democratic-Republican) 47.5% |
| Massachusetts 13 District of Maine "2nd Eastern District" | Peleg Wadsworth | Federalist | 1792 | Incumbent re-elected. | ▌ ✓ Peleg Wadsworth (Federalist) 100% |
| Massachusetts 14 District of Maine "3rd Eastern District" | George Thatcher | Federalist | 1788 | Incumbent re-elected. | ▌ ✓ George Thatcher (Federalist) 100% |

== New Hampshire ==
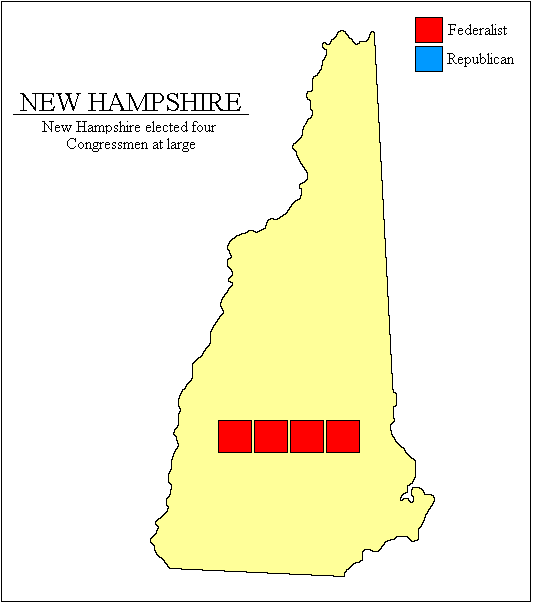
New Hampshire's results

In 1796, New Hampshire had a single at-large district with 4 seats. Each voter cast 4 votes and a majority of voters (12.5% of votes) was required to be elected. Since only three candidates received a majority, a run-off was held between the candidates in fourth and fifth place to fill the remaining seat.

| District | Incumbent | | | This race | |
| District | Member | Party | First elected | Results | Candidates (Note: Only candidates with at least 1% of the vote listed) |
|---|---|---|---|---|---|
| New Hampshire at-large 4 seats on a general ticket | Jeremiah Smith | Federalist | 1790 | Incumbent re-elected. | First ballot (August 29, 1796): ▌ ✓ Jeremiah Smith (Federalist) 25.0%; ▌ ✓ Abiel Foster (Federalist) 24.3%; ▌ ✓ William Gordon (Federalist) 14.9%; ▌ Jonathan Freeman (Federalist) 9.5%; ▌ Peleg Sprague (Federalist) 4.4%; ▌Woodbury Langdon (Democratic-Republican) 4.2%; ▌John Prentice 4.1%; ▌Thomas Cogwell 3.4%; ▌Nathaniel Peabody 2.3%; ▌John Bellows 2.1%; ▌Joseph Cilley 1.9%; ▌Nathaniel Rogers 1.9%; Second ballot (November 7, 1796); ▌ ✓ Jonathan Freeman (Federalist) 72.5%; ▌Peleg Sprague (Federalist) 27.5% |
| New Hampshire at-large 4 seats on a general ticket | Nicholas Gilman | Federalist | 1788/89 | Incumbent retired. Federalist hold. | |
| New Hampshire at-large 4 seats on a general ticket | John S. Sherburne | Democratic- Republican | 1792 | Incumbent retired. Federalist gain. | |
| New Hampshire at-large 4 seats on a general ticket | Abiel Foster | Federalist | 1794 | Incumbent re-elected. | |

== New Jersey ==
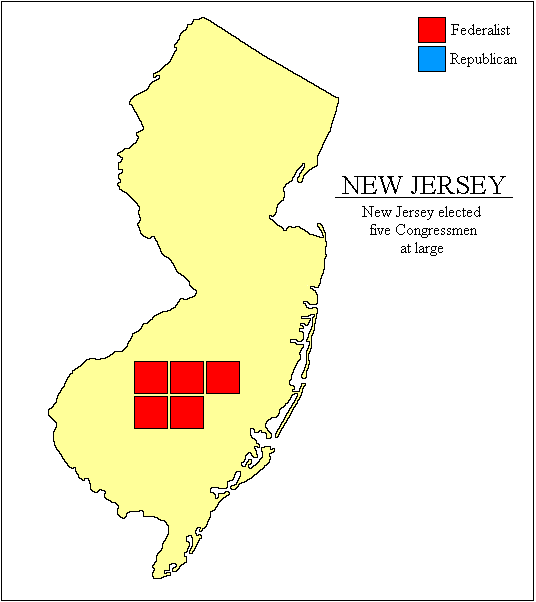
New Jersey's results

| District | Incumbent | | | This race | |
| District | Member | Party | First elected | Results | Candidates |
|---|---|---|---|---|---|
| New Jersey at-large 5 seats on a general ticket | Jonathan Dayton | Federalist | 1791 | Incumbent re-elected. | ▌ ✓ Jonathan Dayton (Federalist) 15.8%; ▌ ✓ Mark Thomson (Federalist) 10.4%; ▌ ✓ James H. Imlay (Federalist) 9.6%; ▌ ✓ James Schureman (Federalist) 9.3%; ▌ ✓ Thomas Sinnickson (Federalist) 9.1%; ▌Aaron Kitchell (Democratic-Republican) 8.6%; ▌Joseph Bloomfield (Democratic-Republican) 5.5%; ▌James Linn (Democratic-Republican) 5.3%; ▌Ebenezer Elmer (Democratic-Republican) 4.8%; ▌John Condit (Democratic-Republican) 4.6%; ▌William Crane (Federalist) 3.5%; ▌Joseph Cooper (Democratic-Republican) 3.5%; ▌William Helms (Democratic-Republican) 2.8%; ▌Thomas Lowrey (Federalist) 1.5%; ▌Jonathan Elmer (Federalist) 1.3% |
| New Jersey at-large 5 seats on a general ticket | Mark Thomson | Federalist | 1794 | Incumbent re-elected. | |
| New Jersey at-large 5 seats on a general ticket | Aaron Kitchell | Federalist | 1794 (special) | Incumbent lost re-election. Federalist hold. | |
| New Jersey at-large 5 seats on a general ticket | Thomas Henderson | Federalist | 1794 | Incumbent lost re-election. Federalist hold. | |
| New Jersey at-large 5 seats on a general ticket | Isaac Smith | Federalist | 1794 | Incumbent retired. Federalist hold. | |

== New York ==
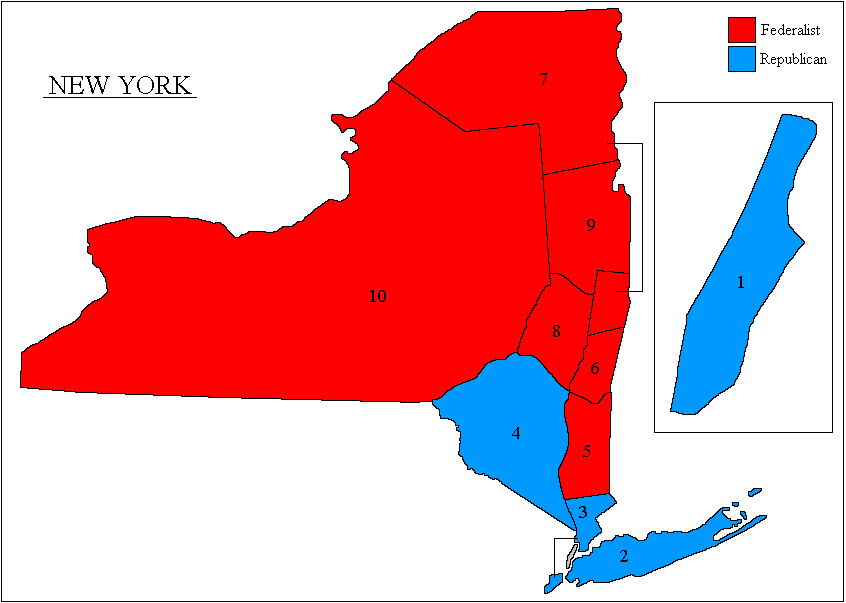
New York's results by district

| District | Incumbent | | | This race | |
| District | Member | Party | First elected | Results | Candidates |
|---|---|---|---|---|---|
| New York 1 | Jonathan Nicoll Havens | Democratic- Republican | 1794 | Incumbent re-elected. | ▌ ✓ Jonathan Nicoll Havens (Democratic-Republican) 66.0%; ▌Selah Strong (Federalist) 34.0% |
| New York 2 | Edward Livingston | Democratic- Republican | 1794 | Incumbent re-elected. | ▌ ✓ Edward Livingston (Democratic-Republican) 56.6%; ▌James Watson (Federalist) 43.3% |
| New York 3 | Philip Van Cortlandt | Democratic- Republican | 1793 | Incumbent re-elected. | ▌ ✓ Philip Van Cortlandt (Democratic-Republican) 50.3%; ▌Samuel Haight (Federalist) 49.7% |
| New York 4 | John Hathorn | Democratic- Republican | 1794 | Incumbent retired. Democratic-Republican hold. | ▌ ✓ Lucas Elmendorf (Democratic-Republican) 56.1%; ▌Conrad E. Elmendorf (Federalist) 43.9% |
| New York 5 | Theodorus Bailey | Democratic- Republican | 1793 | Incumbent lost re-election. Federalist gain. | ▌ ✓ David Brooks (Federalist) 54.5%; ▌Theodorus Bailey (Democratic-Republican) 45.5% |
| New York 6 | Ezekiel Gilbert | Federalist | 1793 | Incumbent retired. Federalist hold. | ▌ ✓ Hezekiah L. Hosmer (Federalist) 57.7%; ▌John P. Van Ness (Democratic-Republican) 42.3% |
| New York 7 | John E. Van Alen | Federalist | 1793 | Incumbent re-elected. | ▌ ✓ John E. Van Alen (Federalist) 57.9%; ▌John Woodworth (Democratic-Republican) 42.1% |
| New York 8 | Henry Glen | Federalist | 1793 | Incumbent re-elected. | ▌ ✓ Henry Glen (Federalist) 77.7%; ▌Peter Swart (Democratic-Republican) 22.3% |
| New York 9 | John Williams | Democratic- Republican | 1794 | Incumbent re-elected as a Federalist. Federalist gain. | ▌ ✓ John Williams (Federalist) 62.8%; ▌James Gordon (Federalist) 27.3%; ▌Douw I. Fonda (Democratic-Republican) 10.0% |
| New York 10 | William Cooper | Federalist | 1794 | Incumbent lost re-election. Federalist hold. | ▌ ✓ James Cochran (Federalist) 50.6%; ▌William Cooper (Federalist) 48.7%; ▌Charles Williamson (Democratic-Republican) 0.7% |

== North Carolina ==
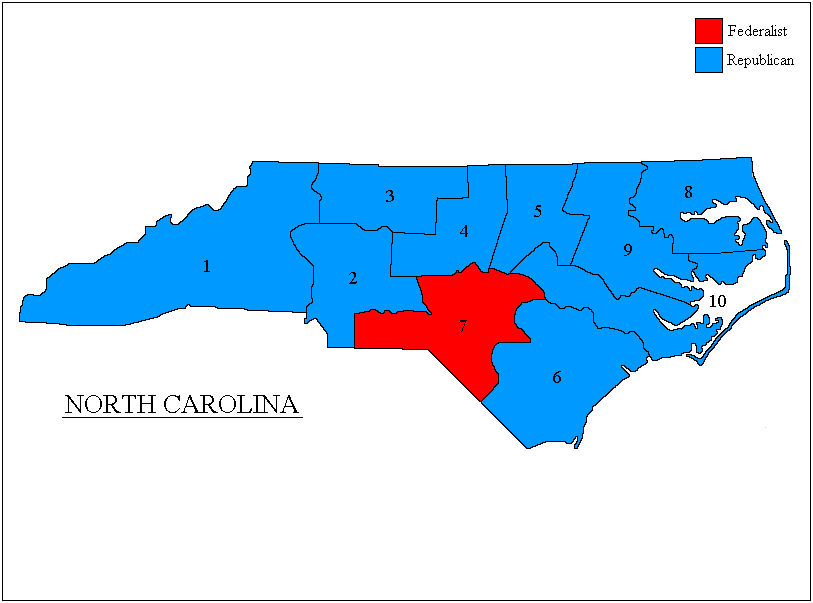
North Carolina's results by district

| District | Incumbent | | | This race | |
| District | Member | Party | First elected | Results | Candidates |
|---|---|---|---|---|---|
| North Carolina 1 | James Holland | Democratic- Republican | 1795 | Incumbent lost re-election. Democratic-Republican hold. | ▌ ✓ Joseph McDowell (Democratic-Republican); ▌James Holland (Democratic-Republican) |
| North Carolina 2 | Matthew Locke | Democratic- Republican | 1793 | Incumbent re-elected. | ▌ ✓ Matthew Locke (Democratic-Republican) 56.9%; ▌Nathaniel Alexander (Democratic-Republican) 27.1%; ▌Robert Irwin (Federalist) 15.8%; Others 0.2% |
| North Carolina 3 | Jesse Franklin | Democratic- Republican | 1795 | Incumbent lost re-election. Democratic-Republican hold. | ▌ ✓ Robert Williams (Democratic-Republican); ▌Jesse Franklin (Democratic-Republican) |
| North Carolina 4 | William F. Strudwick | Federalist | 1796 (special) | Incumbent retired. Democratic-Republican gain. | ▌ ✓ Richard Stanford (Democratic-Republican); ▌Absalom Tatom (Democratic-Republican); ▌William Sheppard (Federalist); ▌Stephen Moore (Federalist) |
| North Carolina 5 | Nathaniel Macon | Democratic- Republican | 1791 | Incumbent re-elected. | ▌ ✓ Nathaniel Macon (Democratic-Republican) 100% |
| North Carolina 6 | James Gillespie | Democratic- Republican | 1793 | Incumbent re-elected. | ▌ ✓ James Gillespie (Democratic-Republican); ▌William H. Hill (Federalist); ▌James Keenan (Unknown); ▌Gabriel Holmes (Independent) |
| North Carolina 7 | William B. Grove | Federalist | 1791 | Incumbent re-elected. | ▌ ✓ William B. Grove (Federalist) 73.4%; ▌Duncan MacFarland (Democratic-Republican) 26.6% |
| North Carolina 8 | Dempsey Burgess | Democratic- Republican | 1795 | Incumbent re-elected. | ▌ ✓ Dempsey Burgess (Democratic-Republican); ▌Joseph Riddick (Democratic-Republican); ▌James Gregory (Federalist); ▌James Brown (Federalist) |
| North Carolina 9 | Thomas Blount | Democratic- Republican | 1793 | Incumbent re-elected. | ▌ ✓ Thomas Blount (Democratic-Republican); ▌Willis Alston (Federalist) |
| North Carolina 10 | Nathan Bryan | Democratic- Republican | 1795 | Incumbent re-elected. | ▌ ✓ Nathan Bryan (Democratic-Republican) 54.1%; ▌Richard D. Spaight (Democratic-Republican) 45.9% |

== Pennsylvania ==
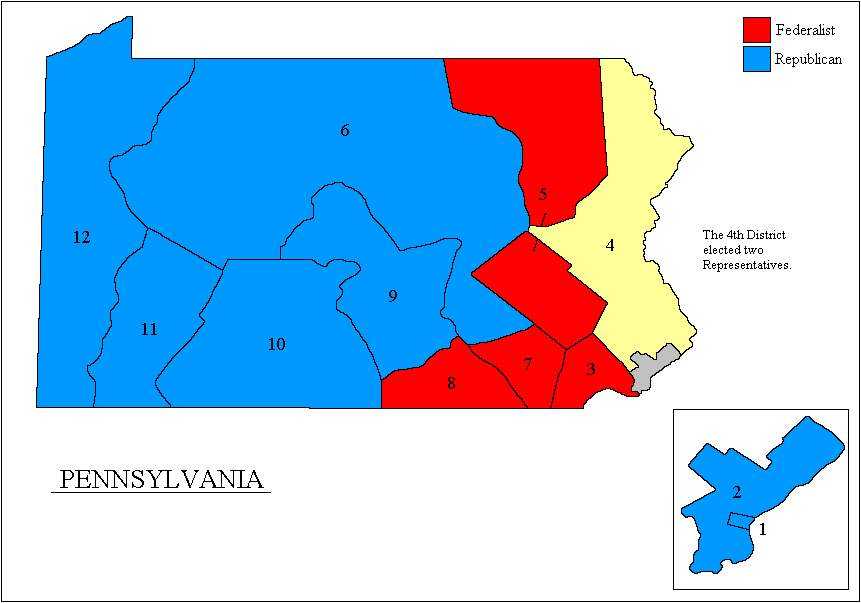
Pennsylvania's results by district

| District | Incumbent | | | This race | |
| District | Member | Party | First elected | Results | Candidates |
|---|---|---|---|---|---|
| Pennsylvania 1 | John Swanwick | Democratic- Republican | 1794 | Incumbent re-elected. | ▌ ✓ John Swanwick (Democratic-Republican) 51.3%; ▌Edward Tilghman (Federalist) 48.7% |
| Pennsylvania 2 | Frederick Muhlenberg | Democratic- Republican | 1788 | Incumbent retired. Democratic-Republican hold. | ▌ ✓ Blair McClenachan (Democratic-Republican) 60.2%; ▌Robert Waln (Federalist) 39.8% |
| Pennsylvania 3 | Richard Thomas | Federalist | 1794 | Incumbent re-elected. | ▌ ✓ Richard Thomas (Federalist) 52.9%; ▌William Gibbons (Democratic-Republican) 47.1% |
| Pennsylvania 4 Plural district with 2 seats | Samuel Sitgreaves | Federalist | 1794 | Incumbent re-elected. | ▌ ✓ Samuel Sitgreaves (Federalist) 42.6%; ▌ ✓ John Chapman (Federalist) 25.2%; ▌Peter Muhlenberg (Democratic-Republican) 13.0%; ▌John Richards (Democratic-Republican) 12.3%; ▌Robert Lollar (Democratic-Republican) 6.9% |
| Pennsylvania 4 Plural district with 2 seats | John Richards | Democratic- Republican | 1794 | Incumbent lost re-election. Federalist gain. | ▌ ✓ Samuel Sitgreaves (Federalist) 42.6%; ▌ ✓ John Chapman (Federalist) 25.2%; ▌Peter Muhlenberg (Democratic-Republican) 13.0%; ▌John Richards (Democratic-Republican) 12.3%; ▌Robert Lollar (Democratic-Republican) 6.9% |
| Pennsylvania 5 | Vacant | | | Representative Daniel Hiester (D-R) resigned July 1, 1796. Federalist gain. Winner was also elected to finish the current term; see above. | ▌ ✓ George Ege (Federalist) 56.8%; ▌Joseph Hiester (Democratic-Republican) 43.2% |
| Pennsylvania 6 | Samuel Maclay | Democratic- Republican | 1794 | Incumbent lost re-election. Democratic-Republican hold. | ▌ ✓ John A. Hanna (Democratic-Republican) 74.3%; ▌John Carson (Federalist) 21.1%; ▌Samuel Maclay (Democratic-Republican) 4.6% |
| Pennsylvania 7 | John W. Kittera | Federalist | 1791 | Incumbent re-elected. | ▌ ✓ John W. Kittera (Federalist) 95.6%; ▌William Webb (Federalist) 4.4% |
| Pennsylvania 8 | Thomas Hartley | Federalist | 1788 | Incumbent re-elected. | ▌ ✓ Thomas Hartley (Federalist) 100% |
| Pennsylvania 9 | Andrew Gregg | Democratic- Republican | 1791 | Incumbent re-elected. | ▌ ✓ Andrew Gregg (Democratic-Republican) 53.8%; ▌William Irvine (Democratic-Republican) 32.0%; ▌James Wallace (Federalist) 7.9%; ▌Robert Whitehall (Democratic-Republican) 4.1%; ▌Thomas Kennedy (Federalist) 2.3% |
| Pennsylvania 10 | David Bard | Democratic- Republican | 1794 | Incumbent re-elected. | ▌ ✓ David Bard (Democratic-Republican) 45.1%; ▌Abraham Smith (Democratic-Republican) 30.3%; ▌William M. Brown (Federalist) 24.6% |
| Pennsylvania 11 | William Findley | Democratic- Republican | 1791 | Incumbent re-elected. | ▌ ✓ William Findley (Democratic-Republican) 79.3%; ▌James Findley (Federalist) 20.7% |
| Pennsylvania 12 | Albert Gallatin | Democratic- Republican | 1794 | Incumbent re-elected. | ▌ ✓ Albert Gallatin (Democratic-Republican) 61.7%; ▌John Woods (Federalist) 26.4%; ▌Thomas Stokely (Federalist) 11.9% |

== Rhode Island ==
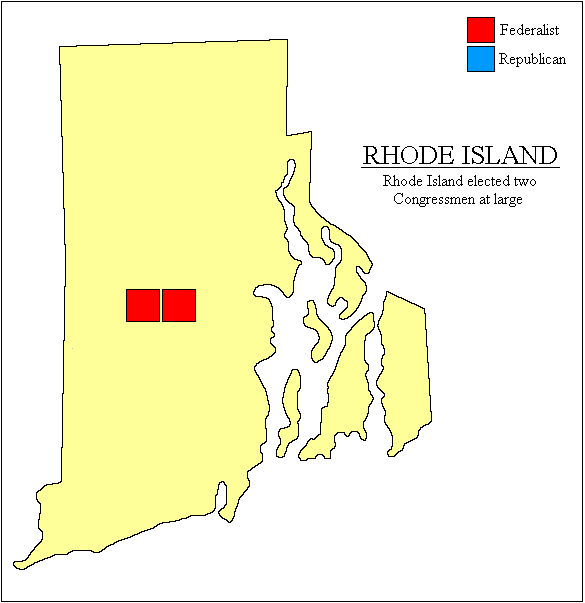
Rhode Island's results

Rhode Island had an at-large district with two seats, each of which were elected separately.

| District | Incumbent | | | This race | |
| District | Member | Party | First elected | Results | Candidates |
|---|---|---|---|---|---|
| Rhode Island at-large Seat A | Benjamin Bourne | Federalist | 1790 | Incumbent re-elected. Winner later declined the seat. | ▌ ✓ Benjamin Bourne (Federalist) 99.9%; Others 0.1% |
| Rhode Island at-large Seat B | Francis Malbone | Federalist | 1792 | Incumbent retired. Federalist hold. | ▌ ✓ Christopher G. Champlin (Federalist) 51.4%; ▌William Greene (Federalist) 48.4%; Others 0.2% |

== South Carolina ==
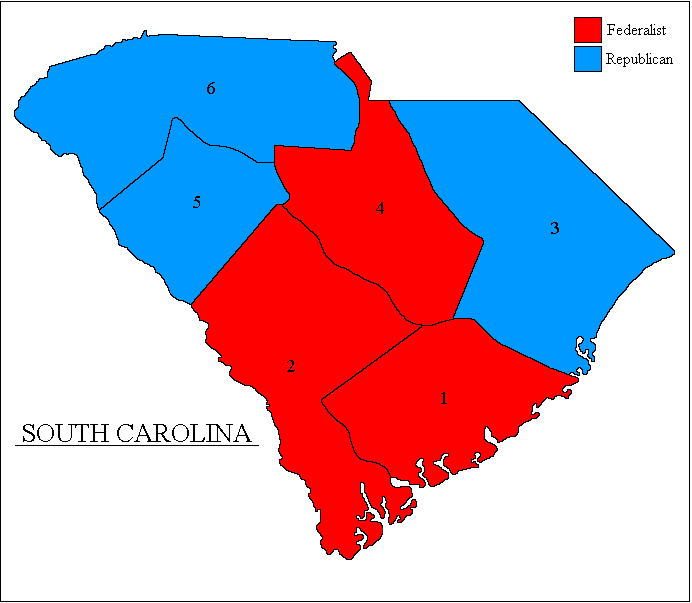
South Carolina's results by district

| District | Incumbent | | | This race | |
| District | Member | Party | First elected | Results | Candidates |
|---|---|---|---|---|---|
| South Carolina 1 "Charleston district" | William L. Smith | Federalist | 1788 | Incumbent re-elected. | ▌ ✓ William L. Smith (Federalist) 84.8%; ▌Robert Simons (Democratic-Republican) 13.6%; ▌John Rutledge (Democratic-Republican) 1.6% |
| South Carolina 2 "Beaufort district" | Wade Hampton | Democratic- Republican | 1794 | Incumbent retired. Federalist gain. | ▌ ✓ John Rutledge Jr. (Federalist) 87.3%; ▌Elnathan Haskell (Democratic-Republican) 16.7% |
| South Carolina 3 "Georgetown district" | Lemuel Benton | Democratic- Republican | 1793 | Incumbent re-elected. | ▌ ✓ Lemuel Benton (Democratic-Republican) 63.3%; ▌Tristam Thomas (Federalist) 24.4%; ▌Joseph Blyth (Federalist) 12.3% |
| South Carolina 4 "Camden district" | Richard Winn | Democratic- Republican | 1793 | Incumbent lost re-election. Democratic-Republican hold. | ▌ ✓ Thomas Sumter (Democratic-Republican) 50.7%; ▌Richard Winn (Federalist) (Note: Although Winn had run as a Democratic-Republican in the previous election, the source used stated that he'd run as a Federalist in this election, however, by the time he returned to Congress in 1801 he was a Democratic-Republican again) 49.3% |
| South Carolina 5 "Ninety-Six district" | Robert Goodloe Harper | Federalist | 1794 | Incumbent re-elected. | ▌ ✓ Robert Goodloe Harper (Federalist) 67.6%; ▌William Butler (Democratic-Republican) 32.4% |
| South Carolina 6 "Washington district" | Samuel Earle | Democratic- Republican | 1794 | Incumbent retired. Democratic-Republican hold. | ▌ ✓ William Smith (Democratic-Republican) 37.0%; ▌Abraham Nott (Federalist) 32.5%; ▌William Will (Democratic-Republican) 25.4%; ▌Samuel Lowrie (Federalist) 2.6%; ▌Robert Anderson (Democratic-Republican) 2.5% |

== Tennessee ==
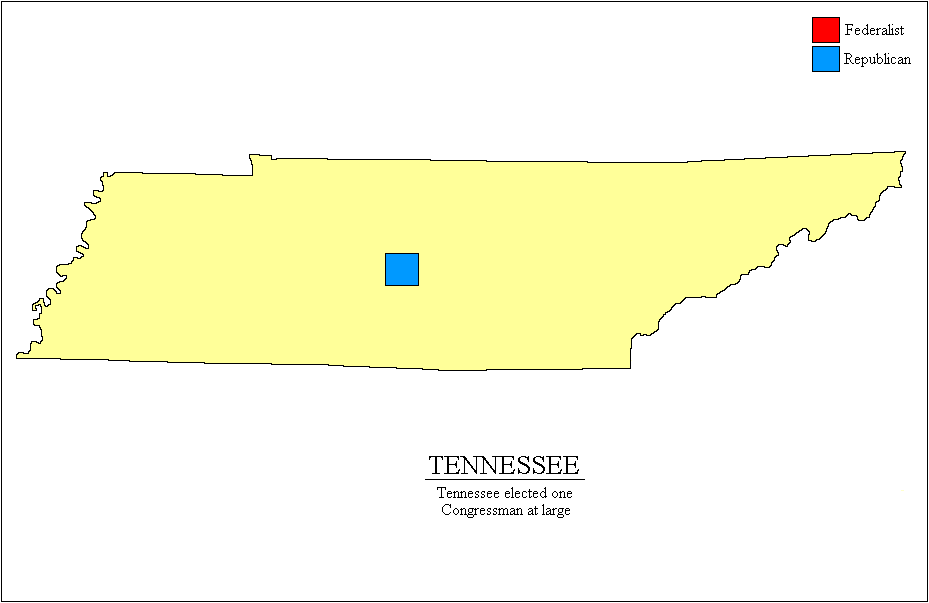
Tennessee's result

| District | Incumbent | | | This race | |
| District | Member | Party | First elected | Results | Candidates |
|---|---|---|---|---|---|
| Tennessee at-large | Andrew Jackson | Democratic- Republican | 1796 | Incumbent re-elected. Winner later resigned in September 1797 when elected U.S. senator. | ▌ ✓ Andrew Jackson (Democratic-Republican); [data missing] |

== Vermont ==
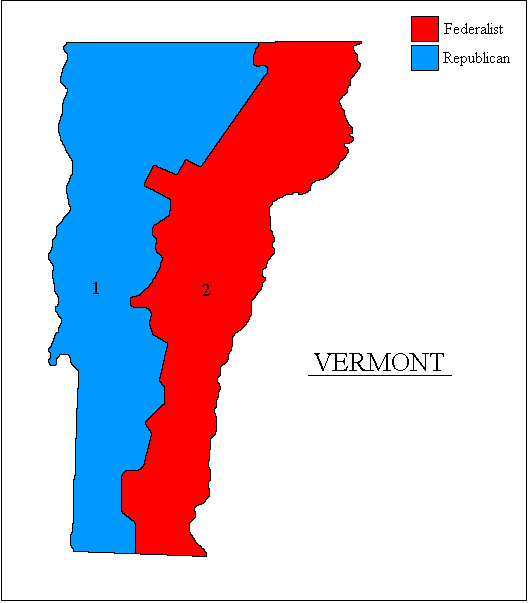
Vermont's results by district

Due to Vermont's law requiring a majority to secure a congressional seat, the 1st district required three ballots to choose a winner.

| District | Incumbent | | | This race | |
| District | Member | Party | First elected | Results | Candidates |
|---|---|---|---|---|---|
| Vermont 1 "Western District" | Israel Smith | Democratic- Republican | 1791 | Incumbent lost re-election. Democratic-Republican hold. | First ballot (September 9, 1796): ▌Matthew Lyon (Democratic-Republican) 40.7%; ▌Israel Smith (Democratic-Republican) 22.1%; ▌Samuel Williams (Unknown) 7.3%; ▌Nathaniel Chipman (Federalist) 7.1%; ▌Isaac Tichenor (Federalist) 6.5%; ▌Gideon Olin (Democratic-Republican) 4.5%; ▌Enoch Woodbridge (Unknown) 4.3%; ▌Jonas Galusha (Democratic-Republican) 3.4%; ▌Daniel Chipman (Federalist) 2.0%; ▌Samuel Hitchcock (Federalist) 1.2%; Others 1.0%; Second ballot (December 11, 1796): ▌Matthew Lyon (Democratic-Republican) 46.7%; ▌Samuel Hitchcock (Federalist) 25.7%; ▌Israel Smith (Democratic-Republican) 21.4%; ▌Samuel Williams (Unknown) 2.9%; ▌Gideon Olin (Democratic-Republican) 1.1%; Others 2.3%; Third ballot (February 7, 1797): ▌ ✓ Matthew Lyon (Democratic-Republican) 55.1%; ▌Samuel Hitchcock (Federalist) 29.4%; ▌Israel Smith (Democratic-Republican) 8.9%; ▌Jonas Galusha (Democratic-Republican) 3.9%; ▌Samuel Williams (Unknown) 0.7%; Scattering 2.1% |
| Vermont 2 "Eastern District" | Daniel Buck | Federalist | 1795 | Incumbent re-elected. Winner declined the seat. | ▌ ✓ Daniel Buck (Federalist) 97.1%; Scattering 2.9% |

== Virginia ==
Virginia's results by district

| District | Incumbent | | | This race | |
| District | Member | Party | First elected | Results | Candidates |
|---|---|---|---|---|---|
| Virginia 1 | Robert Rutherford | Democratic-Republican | 1793 | Incumbent lost re-election. Federalist gain. Election unsuccessfully challenged by Rutherford. | ▌ ✓ Daniel Morgan (Federalist); ▌Robert Rutherford (Democratic-Republican) |
| Virginia 2 | Andrew Moore | Democratic-Republican | 1789 | Incumbent retired. Democratic-Republican hold. | ▌ ✓ David Holmes (Democratic-Republican) 60.4%; ▌John Steele (Federalist) 27.5%; ▌John Bowyer (Democratic-Republican) 12.1% |
| Virginia 3 | George Jackson | Democratic-Republican | 1795 | Incumbent lost re-election. Federalist gain. | ▌ ✓ James Machir (Federalist) 45.4%; ▌George Jackson (Democratic-Republican) 28.7%; ▌John Mitchell (Democratic-Republican) 20.1%; ▌Thomas Wilson (Federalist) 5.7% |
| Virginia 4 | Francis Preston | Democratic-Republican | 1793 | Incumbent retired. Democratic-Republican hold. | ▌ ✓ Abram Trigg (Democratic-Republican) 100% |
| Virginia 5 | George Hancock | Federalist | 1793 | Incumbent retired. Democratic-Republican gain. | ▌ ✓ John J. Trigg (Democratic-Republican) 100% |
| Virginia 6 | Isaac Coles | Democratic-Republican | 1793 | Incumbent retired. Democratic-Republican hold. | ▌ ✓ Matthew Clay (Democratic-Republican) 100% |
| Virginia 7 | Abraham B. Venable | Democratic-Republican | 1790 | Incumbent re-elected. | ▌ ✓ Abraham B. Venable (Democratic-Republican) |
| Virginia 8 | Thomas Claiborne | Democratic-Republican | 1793 | Incumbent re-elected. | ▌ ✓ Thomas Claiborne (Democratic-Republican) 62.3%; ▌Jesse Browne (Federalist) 37.7% |
| Virginia 9 | William B. Giles | Democratic-Republican | 1790 | Incumbent re-elected. | ▌ ✓ William B. Giles (Democratic-Republican) 100% |
| Virginia 10 | Carter B. Harrison | Democratic-Republican | 1793 | Incumbent re-elected. | ▌ ✓ Carter B. Harrison (Democratic-Republican) 55.4%; ▌Edwin Gray (Federalist) 44.6% |
| Virginia 11 | Josiah Parker | Federalist | 1789 | Incumbent re-elected. | ▌ ✓ Josiah Parker (Federalist) 100% |
| Virginia 12 | John Page | Democratic-Republican | 1789 | Incumbent lost re-election. Federalist gain. | ▌ ✓ Thomas Evans (Federalist); ▌John Page (Democratic-Republican) |
| Virginia 13 | John Clopton | Democratic-Republican | 1795 | Incumbent re-elected. | ▌ ✓ John Clopton (Democratic-Republican); ▌Burwell Bassett (Federalist) |
| Virginia 14 | Samuel J. Cabell | Democratic-Republican | 1795 | Incumbent re-elected. | ▌ ✓ Samuel J. Cabell (Democratic-Republican) 100% |
| Virginia 15 | James Madison | Democratic-Republican | 1789 | Incumbent retired. Democratic-Republican hold. | ▌ ✓ John Dawson (Democratic-Republican); ▌Thomas Posey (Federalist) |
| Virginia 16 | Anthony New | Democratic-Republican | 1793 | Incumbent re-elected. | ▌ ✓ Anthony New (Democratic-Republican) 70.6%; ▌Carter Braxton Jr. (Federalist) 29.3%; ▌Robert P. Waring (Unknown) 0.1% |
| Virginia 17 | Richard Brent | Democratic-Republican | 1795 | Incumbent re-elected. | ▌ ✓ Richard Brent (Democratic-Republican) 100%; ▌Leven Powell (Federalist) (Note: The source used does not list votes for Powell, but provides a citations stating "Col. Powell of Loudoun was expected to have been a candidate on this occasion; but from the present ill state of his health, it was understood he had declined and consequently had but a few votes.") |
| Virginia 18 | John Nicholas | Democratic-Republican | 1793 | Incumbent re-elected. | ▌ ✓ John Nicholas (Democratic-Republican); ▌John Blackwell (Federalist); ▌William Fitzhugh (Federalist) |
| Virginia 19 | John Heath | Democratic-Republican | 1793 | Incumbent retired. Democratic-Republican hold. | ▌ ✓ Walter Jones (Democratic-Republican); ▌Burgess Ball (Federalist) |

== See also ==
- 1796 United States elections
  - List of United States House of Representatives elections (1789–1822)
  - 1796–97 United States Senate elections
  - 1796 United States presidential election
- 4th United States Congress
- 5th United States Congress

== Bibliography ==
- "A New Nation Votes: American Election Returns 1787-1825". Tufts Digital Library, Tufts University. Archived from the original on January 29, 2015.
- Dubin, Michael J. (March 1, 1998). United States Congressional Elections, 1788-1997: The Official Results of the Elections of the 1st Through 105th Congresses. McFarland and Company. ISBN 978-0786402830.
- Martis, Kenneth C. (January 1, 1989). The Historical Atlas of Political Parties in the United States Congress, 1789-1989. Macmillan Publishing Company. ISBN 978-0029201701.
- "Party Divisions of the House of Representatives* 1789–Present". Office of the Historian, United States House of Representatives.
- Mapping Early American Elections project team (2019). "Mapping Early American Elections". Roy Rosenzweig Center for History and New Media, George Mason University.
