= 1796 Massachusetts's 10th congressional district special election =

A special election was held in Massachusetts's 10th congressional district on August 1, 1796, and September 12, 1796, to fill a vacancy left by the resignation of Benjamin Goodhue (F) in June, 1796. Goodhue had resigned upon being elected to the Senate.

== Election results ==
Two elections were held due to a majority not being achieved on the first vote.

Candidate	Party	First ballot		Second ballot	
Candidate	Party	Votes	Percent	Votes	Percent
Samuel Sewall	Federalist	183	31.9%	417	61.7%
Loammi Baldwin	Federalist			259	38.3%
Jonathan Ingersoll	Unknown	129	22.5%		
John Morris	Unknown	121	21.2%		
John Cabot	Unknown	60	10.5%		
Samuel Holten	Federalist	39	6.8%		
Elias H. Dooly	Unknown	23	4.0%		
Scattering		18	3.1%		

Sewall took his seat on December 7, 1796

== See also ==
- List of special elections to the United States House of Representatives
