= Tennessee's at-large congressional district =

- Obsolete district
- Created: 1796; 1870
- Eliminated: 1805; 1875
- Years active: 1796–1805; 1873–1875

Tennessee's at-large congressional district was the statewide electoral arrangement used to elect members of the United States House of Representatives from Tennessee rather than from geographically defined congressional districts. Tennessee used at-large representation in two periods, from 1796 to 1805 and from 1873 to 1875.

After achieving statehood in 1796, Tennessee initially elected one representative statewide. Following the 1800 census, the state's delegation increased to three members, all of whom were elected statewide on a general ticket for the 8th Congress from 1803 to 1805. Tennessee then adopted numbered congressional districts. An at-large seat was used again for the 43rd Congress from 1873 to 1875, alongside nine other districts. No further at-large seats were apportioned to Tennessee after 1875.

== List of members representing the district ==
The district was organized after achieving statehood in 1796.

=== 1796–1805: one, then three seats ===
Tennessee began with one seat in 1796. It was apportioned two more seats in 1803. With the addition of two representatives following the 1800 census, all three seats were elected 'General Ticket' statewide for the 8th Congress.

Cong ress	Years	Seat A			Seat B			Seat C		
Cong ress	Years	Member	Party	Electoral history	Member	Party	Electoral history	Member	Party	Electoral history
4th	March 4, 1795 – June 1, 1796	Statehood achieved June 1, 1796								
4th	June 1, 1796 – December 5, 1796	Vacant								
4th	December 5, 1796 – March 3, 1797	Andrew Jackson (Nashville)	Democratic-Republican	Elected October 15, 1796, to finish the new term and seated December 5, 1796. Re-elected in 1797. Resigned when elected U.S. senator.						
5th	March 4, 1797 – September 26, 1797	Andrew Jackson (Nashville)	Democratic-Republican	Elected October 15, 1796, to finish the new term and seated December 5, 1796. Re-elected in 1797. Resigned when elected U.S. senator.						
5th	September 26, 1797 – November 23, 1797	Vacant								
5th	November 23, 1797 – March 3, 1799	William C. C. Claiborne	Democratic-Republican	Elected September 26, 1797, to finish Jackson's term and seated November 23, 1797, despite being under the minimum age for service. Re-elected in 1799. Re-elected in 1801 but resigned to become Governor of Mississippi Territory.						
6th	March 4, 1799 – March 3, 1801	William C. C. Claiborne	Democratic-Republican	Elected September 26, 1797, to finish Jackson's term and seated November 23, 1797, despite being under the minimum age for service. Re-elected in 1799. Re-elected in 1801 but resigned to become Governor of Mississippi Territory.						
7th	March 4, 1801 – December 7, 1801	Vacant								
7th	December 7, 1801 – March 3, 1803	William Dickson (Nashville)	Democratic-Republican	Elected November 14, 1801, to finish Claiborne's term and seated December 7, 1801. Re-elected in 1803. Redistricted to the 3rd district.						
8th	March 4, 1803 – March 3, 1805	William Dickson (Nashville)	Democratic-Republican	Elected November 14, 1801, to finish Claiborne's term and seated December 7, 1801. Re-elected in 1803. Redistricted to the 3rd district.	George Campbell (Knoxville)	Democratic-Republican	Elected in 1803. Redistricted to the 2nd district.	John Rhea (Blountville)	Democratic-Republican	Elected in 1803. Redistricted to the 1st district.

=== 1873–1875: one at-large seat, among nine other districts ===
Cong ress	Years	Member	Party	Note
43rd	March 4, 1873 – March 3, 1875	Horace Maynard (Knoxville)	Republican	Redistricted from the 2nd district and re-elected in 1872. Retired.

No future at-large seats were apportioned after 1875.
