= 1797 Tennessee's at-large congressional district special election =

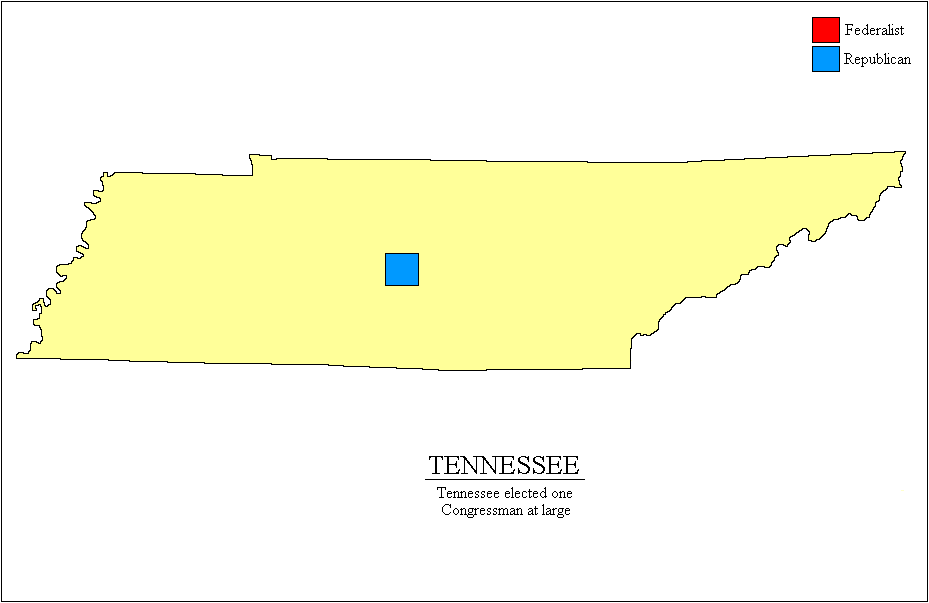
Tennessee's result

District	Incumbent	Party	First elected	Result	Candidates
Tennessee at-large	Andrew Jackson	Democratic-Republican	1796	Incumbent resigned when elected U.S. Senator. New member elected. Democratic-Republican hold.	√ William C. C. Claiborne (Democratic-Republican); John Rhea (Democratic-Republican); John Carter

== See also ==
- 1796 and 1797 United States House of Representatives elections
- List of United States representatives from Tennessee
