= 1796 United States House of Representatives election in Tennessee =

- October 15, 1796
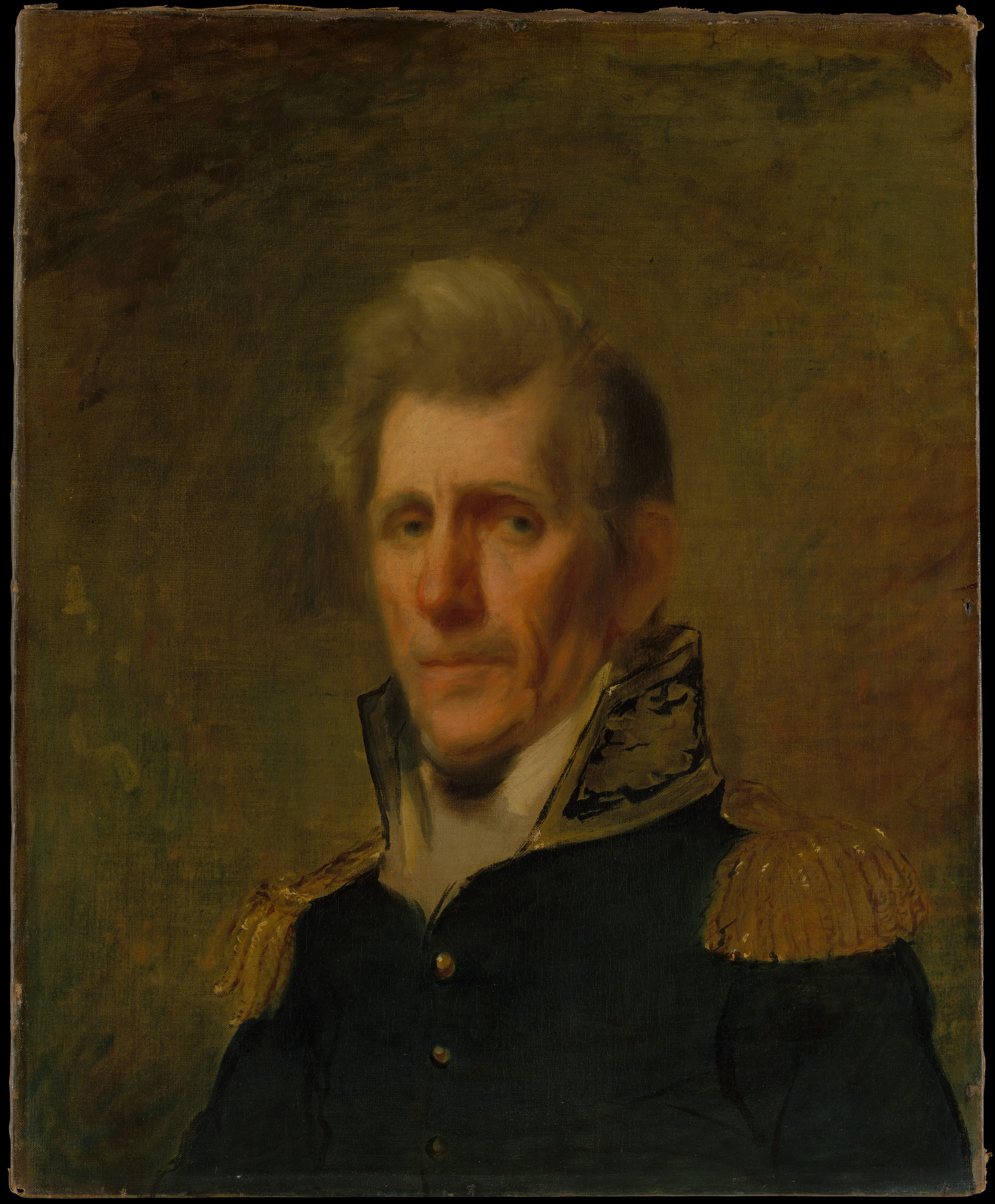

Nominee	Andrew Jackson	James Rody
Party	Democratic-Republican	Nonpartisan
Popular vote	1,113	12
Percentage	98.9%	1.1%
- Results by electoral district Jackson: 96.3% 100% Undistricted counties: Indian Territory
U.S. Representative before election
District established
Elected U.S. Representative
Andrew Jackson
Democratic-Republican

The 1796 United States House of Representatives election in Tennessee was held on October 15, 1796, to determine the first Congressman of Tennessee. Tennessee was admitted to the United States on June 1, 1796. Democratic-Republican candidate, Andrew Jackson defeated his Nonpartisan opponent, James Roby, with 98.9% of the vote.

Andrew Jackson was seated in Congress on December 5, 1796.

== General election ==
1796 Tennessee's at-large congressional district election
Party	Candidate	Votes	%
Democratic-Republican	Andrew Jackson	1,113	98.93%
Nonpartisan	James Rody	12	1.07%
Total votes		1,125	100.00%
Democratic-Republican win (new seat)			

== See also ==
- 1796 United States elections
- 1796–97 United States House of Representatives elections
- List of United States representatives from Tennessee
- History of Tennessee
- Presidency of Andrew Jackson
