= John Chew Thomas =

American politician (1764–1836)

Member of the U.S. House of Representatives from Maryland's 2nd district
- In office March 4, 1799 – March 3, 1801
- Preceded by: Richard Sprigg Jr.
- Succeeded by: Richard Sprigg Jr.

Member of the Maryland House of Delegates
- In office 1796–1797

Personal details
- Born: October 15, 1764 Perryville, Maryland, British America
- Died: May 10, 1836 (aged 71) Leiperville, Pennsylvania, U.S.
- Party: Federalist
- Education: University of Pennsylvania

John Chew Thomas (October 15, 1764 – May 10, 1836) was an American politician who served as a Federalist member of the U.S. House of Representatives for Maryland's 2nd congressional district from 1799 to 1801. He also served as a member of the Maryland State House of Delegates from 1796 to 1797.

Born in Perryville, Maryland, Thomas attended private schools and graduated from the University of Pennsylvania at Philadelphia in 1783. He studied law, and was admitted to the bar in Philadelphia on December 15, 1787, but did not engage in extensive practice. Around 1789 he moved to "Fairland" in Anne Arundel County, Maryland. After his stint in the Maryland House of Delegates, he was elected as a Federalist to the Sixth Congress, and served from March 4, 1799, to March 3, 1801, but declined to be a candidate for reelection in 1801.

In 1810, Thomas sold Fairland, freed most of his slaves, and returned to Pennsylvania, where he lived until his death near Leiperville. He is interred in the Chester Friends Meetinghouse Cemetery in Chester, Pennsylvania.

U.S. House of Representatives
Preceded by Richard Sprigg, Jr.	Member of the U.S. House of Representatives from Maryland's 2nd congressional district 1799–1801	Succeeded by Richard Sprigg, Jr.
