= 1796 Rhode Island's at-large congressional district special election =

A special election was held in Rhode Island's at-large congressional district on November 15, 1796, to fill a vacancy left in both the 4th and 5th Congresses by the resignation of Benjamin Bourne (F).

== Election results ==
Candidate	Party	Votes	Percent
Elisha R. Potter	Federalist	1,619	71.0%
Peleg Arnold	Democratic-Republican	662	29.0%

Potter took his seat December 19, 1796 but the subsequently resigned after the 1st Session of the 5th Congress, resulting in a second special election

== See also ==
- List of special elections to the United States House of Representatives
