= 1796 Maryland's 2nd congressional district special election =

A special election was held in Maryland's 2nd congressional district on April 18, 1796, to fill a vacancy left by the resignation of Gabriel Duvall (DR) on March 28, 1796.

== Election results ==
Candidate	Party	Votes	Percent
Richard Sprigg, Jr.	Democratic-Republican	142	100%

Sprigg took his seat May 5, 1796

== See also ==
- List of special elections to the United States House of Representatives
