= 1796–97 United States Senate elections =

- Dates vary by state
- Class 1

11 of the 32 seats in the United States Senate (plus special elections) 17 seats needed for a majority
	Majority party	Minority party
Party	Federalist	Democratic-Republican
Seats before	19	12
Seats after	20	10
Seat change	▲1	▼2
Seats up	8	3
Races won	9	1
- Results: Federalist hold Federalist gain Dem-Republican hold Legislature failed to elect
Majority Party before election
Federalist
Elected Majority Party
Federalist

The 1796–97 United States Senate elections were held on various dates in various states. As these U.S. Senate elections were prior to the ratification of the Seventeenth Amendment in 1913, senators were chosen by state legislatures. Senators were elected over a wide range of time throughout 1796 and 1797, and a seat may have been filled months late or remained vacant due to legislative deadlock. In these elections, terms were up for the senators in Class 1.

They coincided with John Adams's election as President. The ruling Federalist Party gained one seat.

== Results summary ==
Senate party division, 5th Congress (1797–1799)

- Majority party: Federalist (22)
- Minority party: Democratic-Republican (9)
- Vacant: 1 (later filled by Democratic-Republican)
- Total seats: 32

== Change in composition ==
=== Before the elections ===
After the August 2, 1796 admission of Tennessee.

DR_{6}	DR_{5}	DR_{4}	DR_{3}	DR_{2}	DR_{1}				
DR_{7}	DR_{8}	DR_{9} N.Y. Ran	DR_{10} Tenn. Ran	DR_{11} Va. Unknown	V_{2}	V_{1}	F_{19} Vt. Resigned	F_{17} R.I. Ran	F_{16} Pa. Ran
Majority →									F_{16} Pa. Ran
F_{7}	F_{8}	F_{9}	F_{10}	F_{11}	F_{12} Conn. Ran	F_{13} Del. Ran	F_{14} Md. Ran	F_{18} Mass. Resigned	F_{15} N.J. Ran
F_{6}	F_{5}	F_{4}	F_{3}	F_{2}	F_{1}				

=== Results of the regular elections ===
DR_{6}	DR_{5}	DR_{4}	DR_{3}	DR_{2}	DR_{1}				
DR_{7}	DR_{8}	DR_{9} Va. Re-elected	V_{2} Tenn. DR Loss	V_{2}	V_{1}	F_{19} Vt. Hold	F_{17} R.I. Re-elected	F_{16} Pa. Re-elected	F_{20} N.Y. Gain
Majority →									F_{20} N.Y. Gain
F_{7}	F_{8}	F_{9}	F_{10}	F_{11}	F_{12} Conn. Re-elected	F_{13} Del. Re-elected	F_{14} Md. Re-elected	F_{18} Mass. Hold	F_{15} N.J. Re-elected
F_{6}	F_{5}	F_{4}	F_{3}	F_{2}	F_{1}				

Key

DR_{#}	Democratic-Republican
F_{#}	Federalist
V_{#}	Vacant

== Race summaries ==
Except if/when noted, the number following candidates is the whole number vote(s), not a percentage.

=== Special elections during the 4th Congress ===
In these special elections, the winners were seated before March 4, 1797; ordered by election date.

State	Incumbent			Results	Candidates
State	Senator	Party	First elected	Results	Candidates
Georgia (class 2)	George Walton	Federalist	1795 (Appointed)	Appointee retired when successor elected. New senator elected February 20, 1796. Democratic-Republican gain.	▌ ✓ Josiah Tattnall (Democratic-Republican); [data missing]
Connecticut (class 1)	Oliver Ellsworth	Federalist	1788	Incumbent resigned to become Chief Justice of the United States. New senator elected May 12, 1796. Federalist hold.	▌ ✓ James Hillhouse (Federalist); [data missing]
Massachusetts (class 1)	George Cabot	Federalist	1790	Incumbent resigned June 9, 1796. New senator elected June 11, 1796 on the second ballot. Federalist hold. Successor also elected the same day to the next term, see below.	▌ ✓ Benjamin Goodhue (Federalist) 75; ▌Edward Robbins 65
Massachusetts (class 2)	Caleb Strong	Federalist	1788	Incumbent resigned June 1, 1796. New senator elected June 11, 1796 on the second ballot. Federalist hold.	▌ ✓ Theodore Sedgwick (Federalist) 107; ▌Edward Robbins (Democratic-Republican) 43; ▌Levi Lincoln (Democratic-Republican) 2; ▌Nathaniel Dane (Federalist) 1; ▌Thomson J. Skinner (Unknown) 1
Connecticut (class 3)	Jonathan Trumbull Jr.	Federalist	1794 or 1795	Incumbent resigned June 10, 1796, to become Lieutenant Governor of Connecticut. New senator elected October 13, 1796. Federalist hold.	▌ ✓ Uriah Tracy (Federalist); [data missing]
Vermont (class 1)	Moses Robinson	Democratic- Republican	1791 (New state)	Incumbent resigned October 15, 1796. New senator elected October 18, 1796. Federalist gain. Winner also elected the same day to the next term; see below.	▌ ✓ Isaac Tichenor (Federalist); [data missing]
New York (class 3)	Rufus King	Federalist	1789	Incumbent resigned May 23, 1796, to become U.S. Minister to Great Britain. New senator elected November 9, 1796. Federalist hold.	▌ ✓ John Laurance (Federalist) 99; ▌Zephaniah Platt (Unknown) 1
New Jersey (class 2)	Frederick Frelinghuysen	Federalist	1792 or 1793	Incumbent resigned November 12, 1796. New senator elected November 12, 1796. Federalist hold.	▌ ✓ Richard Stockton (Federalist) Unanimous
Maryland (class 1)	Richard Potts	Federalist	1793 (special)	Incumbent resigned October 24, 1796. New senator elected November 28, 1796. Federalist hold. Successor also later elected to the next term; see below.	▌ ✓ John Eager Howard (Federalist); ▌W. Spriggs (Federalist) 15
South Carolina (class 2)	Pierce Butler	Democratic- Republican	1789	Incumbent resigned October 25, 1796. New senator elected December 8, 1796. Democratic-Republican hold.	▌ ✓ John Hunter (Democratic-Republican) 72; ▌John Chestnut (Unknown) 66

=== Races leading to the 5th Congress ===
In these regular elections, the winner was seated on March 4, 1797; ordered by state.

All of the elections involved the Class 1 seats.

State	Incumbent			Results	Candidates
State	Senator	Party	First elected	Results	Candidates
Connecticut	James Hillhouse	Federalist	1796 (special)	Incumbent re-elected in 1797.	▌ ✓ James Hillhouse (Federalist); [data missing]
Delaware	Henry Latimer	Federalist	1795 (special)	Incumbent re-elected January 6, 1797.	▌ ✓ Henry Latimer (Federalist) 16; ▌David Hall (Democratic-Republican) 6
Maryland	John Eager Howard	Federalist	1796 (special)	Incumbent re-elected December 9, 1796.	▌ ✓ John Eager Howard (Federalist); [data missing]
Massachusetts	George Cabot	Federalist	1790	Incumbent resigned June 9, 1796. New senator elected June 11, 1796 on the third ballot. Federalist hold. Winner also elected to finish the current term; see above.	▌ ✓ Benjamin Goodhue (Federalist) 73; ▌Edward H. Robbins (Unknown)
New Jersey	John Rutherfurd	Federalist	1790	Incumbent re-elected in 1796.	▌ ✓ John Rutherfurd (Federalist); [data missing]
New York	Aaron Burr	Democratic- Republican	1791	Incumbent lost re-election. New senator elected January 24, 1797. Federalist gain.	▌ ✓ Philip Schuyler (Federalist) 85; ▌James Kent (Federalist) 1
Pennsylvania	James Ross	Federalist	1794 (special)	Incumbent re-elected February 16, 1797.	▌ ✓ James Ross (Federalist) 56; ▌William Irvine (Democratic-Republican) 38
Rhode Island	Theodore Foster	Federalist	1790	Incumbent re-elected in 1797.	▌ ✓ Theodore Foster (Federalist); [data missing]
Tennessee	William Cocke	Democratic- Republican	1796	Legislature failed to elect. Democratic-Republican loss. Incumbent later appointed to continue term.	None
Vermont	Moses Robinson	Democratic- Republican	1791 (new state)	Incumbent resigned October 15, 1796. New senator elected October 18, 1796. Federalist gain. Winner also elected to finish the current term, see above.	▌ ✓ Isaac Tichenor (Federalist); [data missing]
Virginia	Stevens Mason	Democratic- Republican	1794 (special)	Incumbent re-elected November 29, 1796.	▌ ✓ Stevens Mason (Democratic-Republican) 114; ▌James Breckinridge (Federalist) 60

=== Special elections during the 5th Congress ===
In these special elections, the winners were elected after the March 4, 1797 beginning of the next Congress.

State	Incumbent			Results	Candidates
State	Senator	Party	First elected	Results	Candidates
Tennessee (class 1)	William Cocke	Democratic- Republican	1796	Interim appointee lost re-election. New senator elected September 26, 1797. Democratic-Republican hold.	▌ ✓ Andrew Jackson (Democratic-Republican) 20; ▌William Cocke (Democratic-Republican) 13
Tennessee (class 2)	William Blount	Democratic- Republican	1796	Incumbent expelled July 8, 1797. New senator elected September 26, 1797. Democratic-Republican hold.	▌ ✓ Joseph Anderson (Democratic-Republican) 33; Unopposed
Vermont (class 1)	Isaac Tichenor	Federalist	1796 (special)	Incumbent resigned October 17, 1797, to become Governor of Vermont. New senator elected October 17, 1797. Federalist hold.	▌ ✓ Nathaniel Chipman (Federalist); [data missing]
Rhode Island (class 2)	William Bradford	Federalist	1793	Incumbent resigned in October 1797. New senator elected November 13, 1797. Federalist hold.	▌ ✓ Ray Greene (Federalist); [data missing]
Maryland (class 3)	John Henry	Federalist	1788	Incumbent resigned July 10, 1797, to become Governor of Maryland. New senator elected December 8, 1797. Federalist hold.	▌ ✓ James Lloyd (Federalist) Majority of one vote only

== Maryland ==
=== Maryland (special, 1796) ===
1796 United States Senate special election in Maryland
- 1796

80 members of the Maryland General Assembly
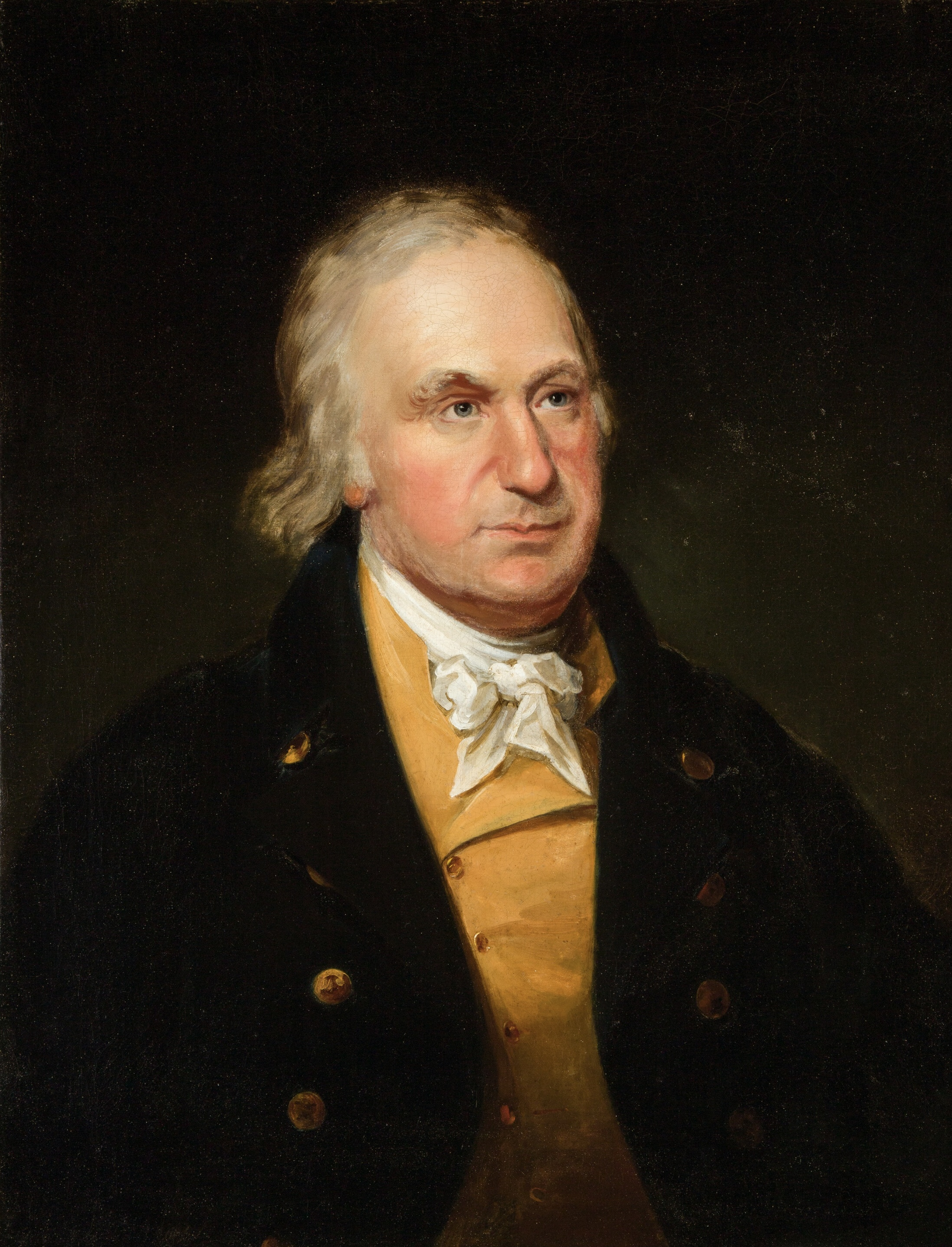
Candidate	John Eager Howard
Party	Federalist
Legislative vote	-
Percentage	-%

John Eager Howard won election to fill the seat vacated by Richard Potts by an unknown number of votes, for the Class 1 seat.

=== Maryland (regular) ===
1796 United States Senate election in Maryland
- 1796

80 members of the Maryland General Assembly
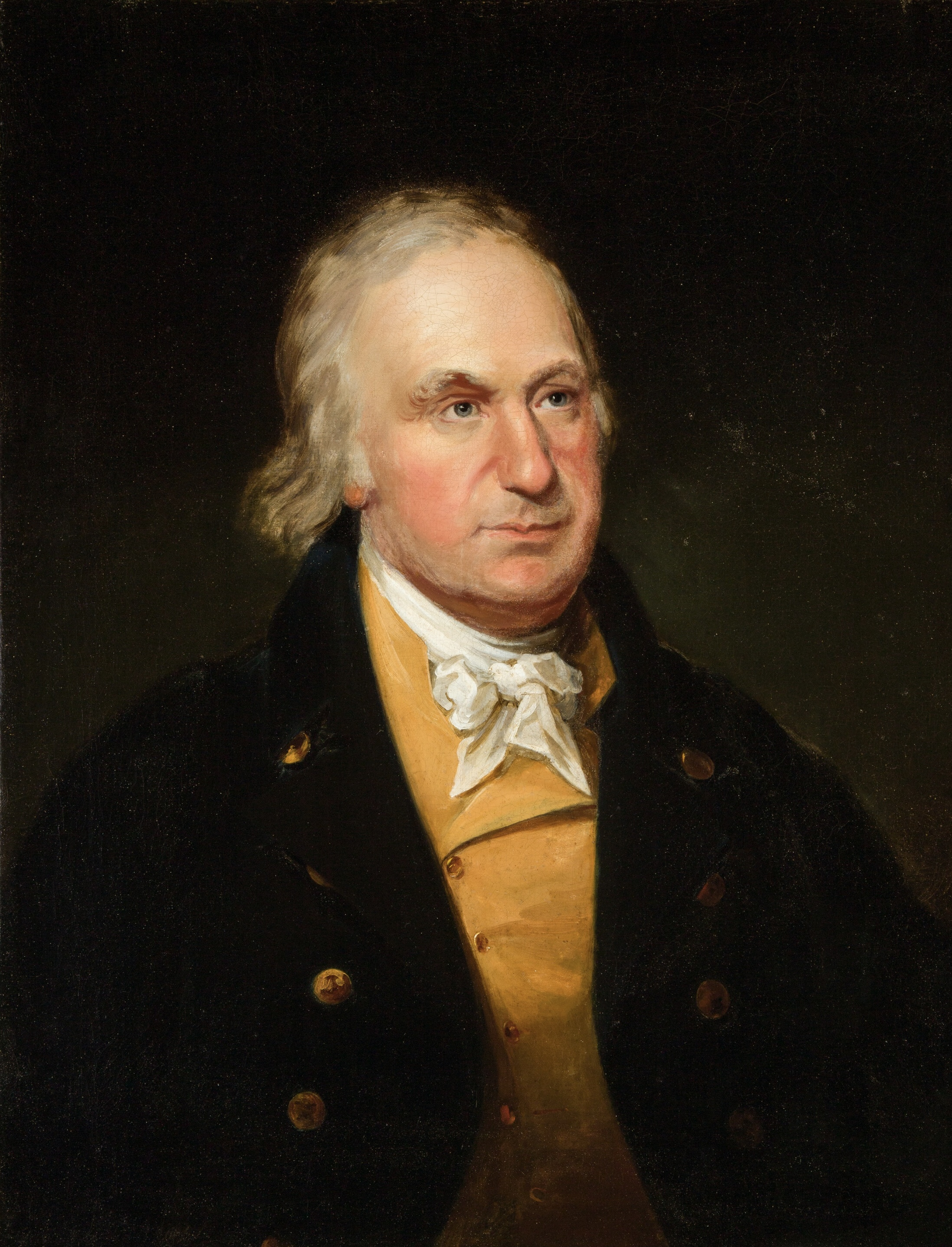
Candidate	John Eager Howard	Richard Sprigg Jr.
Party	Federalist	Democratic-Republican
Legislative vote	-
Percentage	-%

John Eager Howard won re-election over Richard Sprigg Jr. by an unknown number of votes, for the Class 1 seat.

=== Maryland (special, 1797) ===
1797 United States Senate special election in Maryland
- December 8, 1797

80 members of the Maryland General Assembly
Candidate	James Lloyd	William Winder
Party	Federalist	Democratic-Republican
Legislative vote	45	44
Percentage	50.56%	49.44%

James Lloyd won election over William Winder by a margin of 1.12%, or 1 vote, for the Class 3 seat.

== Tennessee ==
=== Tennessee (initial) ===
Tennessee became a state June 1, 1796 and elected its new senators August 2, 1796.

=== Tennessee (special, class 1) ===
The term of the initially elected senator, Democratic-Republican William Cocke, ended March 3, 1797, and the Tennessee legislature failed to elect a senator for the new term. The governor of Tennessee, therefore, appointed Cocke to begin the term, pending a special election. Cocke, however, lost that October 6, 1798 special election to Democratic-Republican Andrew Jackson.

=== Tennessee (special, class 2) ===
Democratic-Republican William Blount was expelled July 8, 1797 for conspiracy with the Kingdom of Great Britain. Democratic-Republican Joseph Anderson was elected September 26, 1797 to finish Blount's term.

== Vermont ==
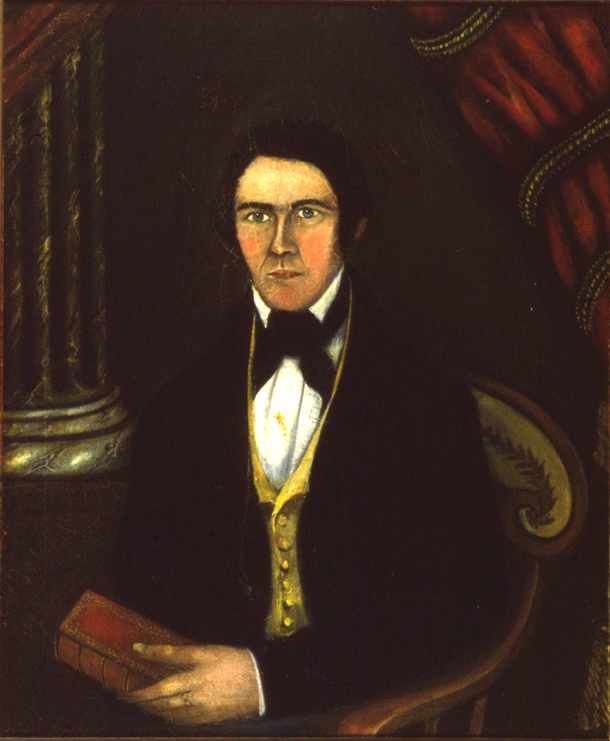
Senator Nathaniel Chipman

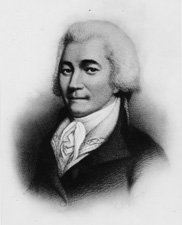
Senator Isaac Tichenor

Incumbent Democratic-Republican Moses Robinson resigned October 15, 1796.

Federalist Isaac Tichenor was elected October 18, 1796, both to finish Robinson's term and to the new term that would begin March 4, 1797. However, Tichenor resigned just one year later, October 17, 1797, to become Governor of Vermont. Federalist Nathaniel Chipman was then elected October 17, 1797, to finish the term.

== See also ==
- 1796 United States elections
  - 1796 United States presidential election
  - 1796–97 United States House of Representatives elections
- 4th United States Congress
- 5th United States Congress
