= 1796 United States elections =

Elections for the 5th U.S. Congress

- ← 1794 1795 1796 1797 1798 → Presidential election year
- Incumbent president: George Washington (Independent)
- Next Congress: 5th

Presidential election
- Partisan control: Federalist gain
- Electoral vote
- John Adams (F): 71
- Thomas Jefferson (DR): 68
- 1796 presidential election results. Green denotes states won by Jefferson, burnt orange denotes states won by Adams. Numbers indicate the number of electoral votes allotted to each state.

Senate elections
- Overall control: Federalist hold
- Seats contested: 11 of 32 seats
- Net seat change: Federalist +1

House elections
- Overall control: Federalist gain
- Seats contested: All 106 voting members
- Net seat change: Federalist +10

Elections were held for the 5th United States Congress, in 1796 and 1797. The election took place during the beginning stages of the First Party System, as the Federalist Party and the Democratic-Republican Party clashed over the states' rights, the financial policies of Treasury Secretary Alexander Hamilton, and the recently ratified Jay Treaty. The Federalists maintained control of the Senate, and won control of the House and the presidency.

== Events of the election ==
In the first contested presidential election and the first presidential election in which parties played a major role, Federalist Vice President John Adams narrowly defeated Democratic-Republican former Secretary of State Thomas Jefferson. Adams won New England while Jefferson won the South, leaving the mid-Atlantic states to decide the election. As the election took place prior to the ratification of the Twelfth Amendment, Jefferson, who finished with the second most electoral votes, succeeded Adams as vice president. Federalist former Governor Thomas Pinckney of South Carolina finished with the third most electoral votes, while Democratic-Republican Senator Aaron Burr of New York finished in fourth place. This election marked the only time in American history that members of two different political parties were elected as president and vice president. Adams's election made him the first member of a political party to be elected president, as George Washington had remained unaffiliated with any political faction or party throughout his presidency.

In the House, Federalists won moderate gains, taking majority control of the chamber.

In the Senate, Federalists picked up one seat, maintaining a commanding majority in the chamber.

== See also ==
- 1796 United States presidential election
- 1796–97 United States House of Representatives elections
- 1796–97 United States Senate elections
