= 1796 Pennsylvania's 5th congressional district special election =

A special election was held in Pennsylvania's 5th congressional district on October 11, 1796, to fill a vacancy caused by the resignation of Daniel Hiester (DR) on July 1, 1796

== Election results ==
Candidate	Party	Votes	Percent
George Ege	Federalist	2,039	56.8%
Joseph Hiester	Democratic-Republican	1,553	43.2%

George Ege also won the 5th district in the general election.

== See also ==
- List of special elections to the United States House of Representatives
