= 1797 Rhode Island's at-large congressional district special election =

A special election was held in Rhode Island's at-large congressional district on August 29, 1797, to fill a vacancy left by the resignation of Elisha R. Potter (F) shortly after the end of the 1st session of the 5th Congress.

== Election results ==
Candidate	Party	Votes	Percent
Thomas Tillinghast	Federalist	234	78.3%
James Burrill, Jr.	Federalist	54	18.1%
Clark	Democratic-Republican	11	3.7%

Tillinghast took office on November 13, 1797

== See also ==
- List of special elections to the United States House of Representatives
