= Samuel Holten =

American Founding Father and politician

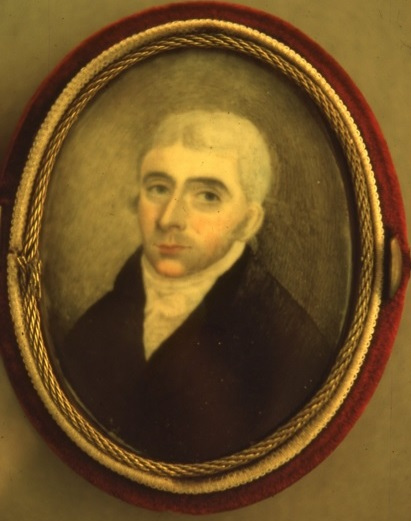
- Oil-on-ivory miniature, circa 1790

Member of the U.S. House of Representatives from Massachusetts's 1st district
- In office March 4, 1793 – March 3, 1795 Serving with Fisher Ames, Samuel Dexter, and Benjamin Goodhue (General Ticket)
- Preceded by: Fisher Ames
- Succeeded by: Theodore Sedgwick

Personal details
- Born: June 9, 1738 Salem Village, Province of Massachusetts Bay, British America
- Died: January 2, 1816 (aged 77) Danvers, Massachusetts, U.S.
- Resting place: Holton Cemetery, Danvers
- Party: Anti-Administration
- Spouse: Mary Warner
- Children: 3

Samuel Holten (June 9, 1738 – January 2, 1816) was an American Founding Father, physician, jurist, and politician from Danvers, Massachusetts. Holten represented the Massachusetts Bay Colony as a delegate to the Continental Congress, where he signed the Articles of Confederation. After numerous roles at the state and national levels in the 1780s, Holten was elected to a term in U.S. House of Representatives, serving from 1793 to 1794. He then was appointed judge in the local courts, a position he held for nearly two decades.

== Biography ==
Holten was born in Salem Village (now Danvers) in the Province of Massachusetts Bay on June 9, 1738. After studying medicine under a local physician, he established a practice in nearby Gloucester. He soon returned to Danvers, where he continued practicing as a physician.

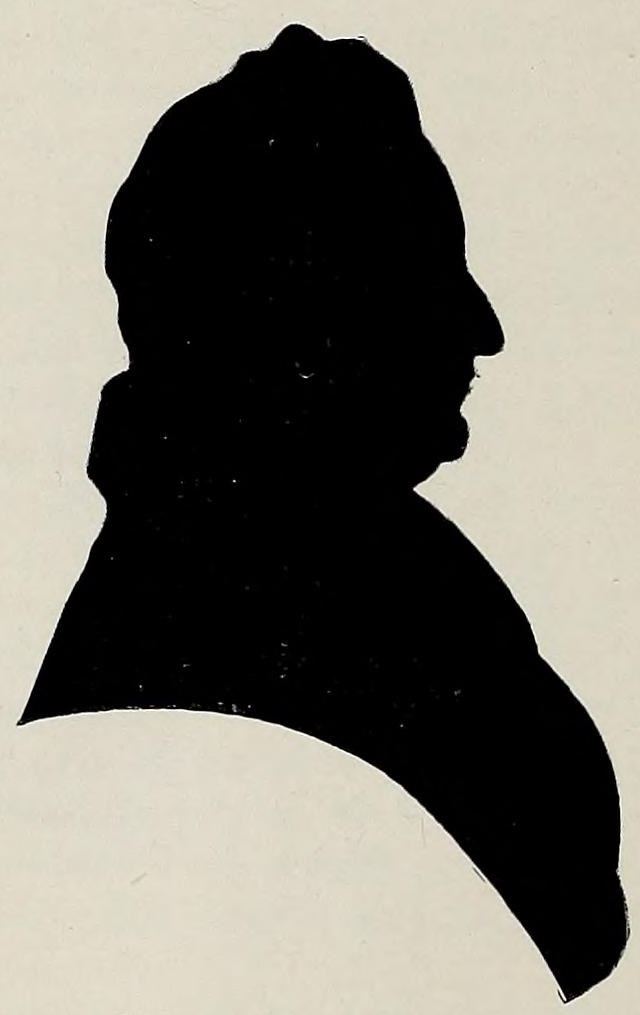
Silhouette of Samuel Holten taken in life, and passed on to his descendants.

During the American Revolution, Holten actively supported the Patriot cause, serving in the militia as a major in the First Essex County Regiment. He was a member of the Massachusetts Provincial Congress from 1774 to 1775, at which point he was named to the Massachusetts Committee of Safety. Holten was appointed to the Continental Congress in 1778, when he signed the Articles of Confederation. He left the Congress in 1780 and then served in the Massachusetts Senate for two years. From 1780 to 1782, Holten was also a member of the Massachusetts Governor's Council, a role he repeated in eight of the next 14 years.

In 1783, Holten was appointed to the Congress of the Confederation, which under the Articles was the new nation's only branch of government. Near the end of his two years in the Congress, Holten served briefly as its chairman: "His Excellency the president, being, by indisposition, prevented from attending the House, Congress proceeded to the election of a Chairman, and, the ballots being taken, the (honorable) Samuel Holten was elected."

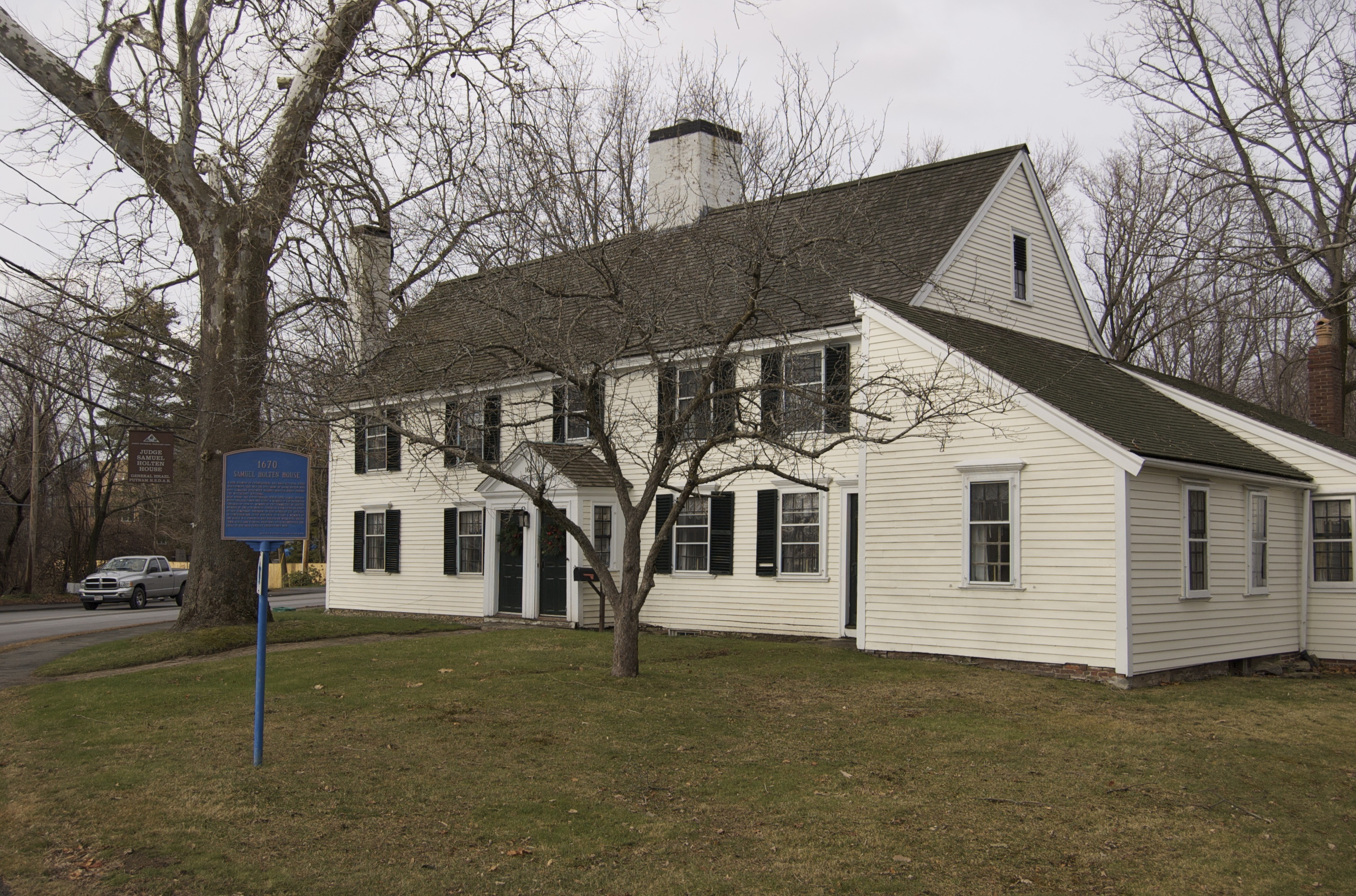
Samuel Holten lived in this house in Danvers, Massachusetts.

Holten returned to the state Senate in 1784, completing additional terms in 1786, 1789, and 1790. In between, in 1787, he served in the Massachusetts House of Representatives and also returned to the Congress of the Confederation for another year. In 1788 and 1790, Holten was an unsuccessful candidate for the 2nd congressional district, and he was also an unsuccessful candidate for the U.S. Senate in 1790; however, he was elected to represent the 1st district in 1792. After leaving the Congress, Holten was appointed judge of the Essex County Probate Court. He sat on the bench from 1796 until his resignation in 1815. Holten also served as the treasurer of the First Church of Danvers for forty years.

== Death ==
Holten died in Danvers on January 2, 1816. He was buried at Holten Cemetery in Danvers.

In 1974 the Danvers Historical Commission placed a plaque in front of his house listing his achievements, the street has also been named in his honor.

U.S. House of Representatives
Preceded by Benjamin Goodhue	Member of the U.S. House of Representatives from Massachusetts's 1st congressional district March 4, 1793 – March 3, 1795	Succeeded by Theodore Sedgwick
