= Samuel Sewall (congressman) =

American judge

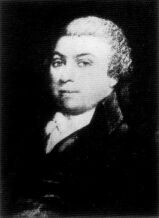

Member of the U.S. House of Representatives from Massachusetts's 10th district
- In office December 7, 1796 – January 10, 1800
- Preceded by: Benjamin Goodhue
- Succeeded by: Nathan Read

Personal details
- Born: December 11, 1757 Boston, Province of Massachusetts Bay, British America
- Died: June 8, 1814 (aged 56) Wiscasset, Massachusetts, U.S. (now Maine)
- Party: Federalist
- Education: Harvard College
- Occupation: Lawyer

Samuel Sewall (December 11, 1757 – June 8, 1814) was an American lawyer and congressman. He was born in Boston in the Province of Massachusetts Bay.

== Biography ==
After attending Dummer Charity School (now The Governor's Academy), Sewall graduated from Harvard College (A.B. 1776, A.M. 1779, honorary LL.D. 1808) and set up practice as a lawyer in Marblehead. He served as a member of the state legislature in 1783, and from 1788 to 1796.

He represented Massachusetts in the U.S. House of Representatives from 1796 to 1800, representing the 10th congressional district, and previously ran for the 1st congressional district in 1792. While in the House, he was appointed an impeachment manager for the impeachment proceedings against Senator William Blount. From 1800 to 1814 served as a judge of the Massachusetts Supreme Judicial Court, becoming chief justice in 1814. He died at Wiscasset in Massachusetts' District of Maine while holding a court there. He was elected a Fellow of the American Academy of Arts and Sciences in 1801.

American novelist Louisa May Alcott was Sewall's great niece. His younger sister, Dorothy, was Alcott's great-grandmother. In 1781, he married Abigail Devereux; they had a family of at least six sons and two daughters. Sewall's great-grandfather Samuel Sewall was a judge at the Salem witch trials in colonial Massachusetts, and subsequently Chief Justice of Massachusetts.

Sewall was elected a member of the American Antiquarian Society on June 1, 1814. Sewall died seven days later on June 8, apparently before he could formally respond, so his disposition regarding membership is unknown.

In 1814, Fort Sewall in Marblehead, Massachusetts, was renamed for him.

U.S. House of Representatives
Preceded by Benjamin Goodhue	Member of the U.S. House of Representatives from Massachusetts's 10th congressional district December 7, 1796 – January 10, 1800	Succeeded by Nathan Read
Legal offices
Preceded by Nathan Cushing	Associate Justice of the Massachusetts Supreme Judicial Court; 1800–1814	Succeeded by Daniel Dewey
Preceded by Theophilus Parsons	Chief Justice of the Massachusetts Supreme Judicial Court; 1814	Succeeded by Isaac Parker
