= Richard Sprigg Jr. =

American politician (1769–1806)

Member of the U.S. House of Representatives from Maryland's 2nd district
- In office March 4, 1801 – February 11, 1802
- Preceded by: John Chew Thomas
- Succeeded by: Walter Bowie
- In office May 5, 1796 – March 3, 1799
- Preceded by: Gabriel Duvall
- Succeeded by: John Chew Thomas

Member of the Maryland House of Delegates
- In office 1792–1793

Personal details
- Born: 1769 Prince George's County, Province of Maryland, British America
- Died: 1806 (aged 36–37) Charleston, South Carolina, U.S.
- Party: Democratic-Republican

Richard Sprigg Jr. (c.1769–1806) was an American lawyer, jurist and politician from Prince George's County, Maryland. He represented Maryland in the U.S. House of Representatives and later served as a state court justice.

Sprigg was born about 1769 in Prince George's County, Maryland. From 1792 to 1793 Sprigg was a member of the Maryland House of Delegates.

Sprigg was elected to congress in 1796 to fill the vacancy caused by the resignation of Gabriel Duvall. Sprigg served in the U.S. Congress from 1796 until 1799 and again in 1801 and 1802.

On January 27, 1806, Governor Robert Bowie appointed Sprigg to the newly restructured court of appeals in place of Gabriel Duvall, who had declined appointment a week earlier.

Sprigg died in Charleston, South Carolina, in 1806.

U.S. House of Representatives
Preceded by Gabriel Duvall	Member of the U.S. House of Representatives from Maryland's 2nd congressional district May 5, 1796 – March 3, 1799	Succeeded by John Chew Thomas
Preceded by John Chew Thomas	Member of the U.S. House of Representatives from Maryland's 2nd congressional district March 4, 1801 – February 11, 1802	Succeeded by Walter Bowie
