= Benjamin Goodhue =

American politician (1748–1814)

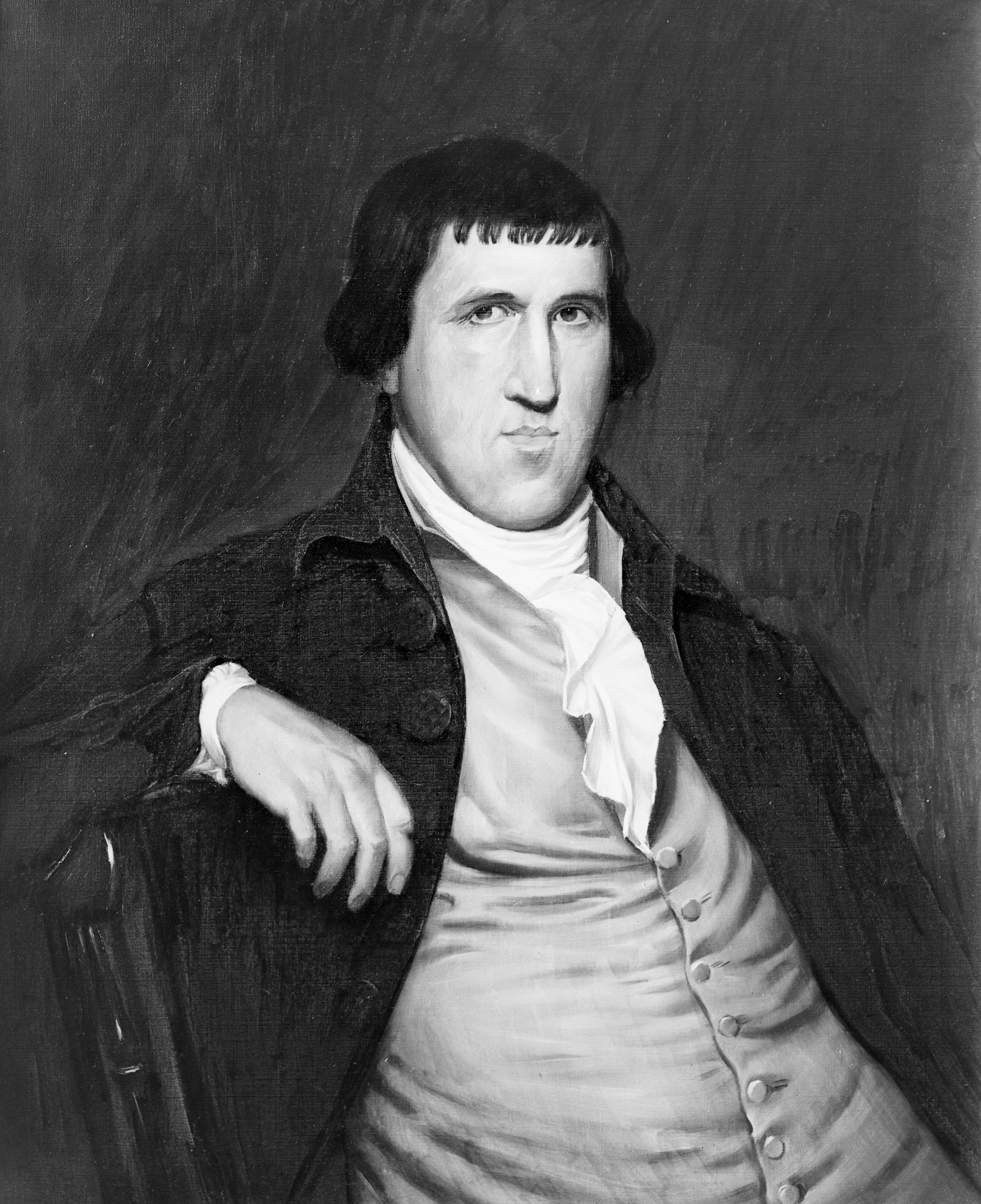
- Portrait of Goodhue
- In office June 11, 1796 – November 8, 1800
- Preceded by: George Cabot
- Succeeded by: Jonathan Mason

Member of the U.S. House of Representatives from Massachusetts
- In office March 4, 1789 – June 11, 1796
- Succeeded by: Samuel Sewall
- Constituency: 2nd district (1789–93); 1st district (1793–95); 10th district (1795–96)

Personal details
- Born: September 20, 1748 Salem, Province of Massachusetts Bay, British America
- Died: July 28, 1814 (aged 65) Salem, Massachusetts, U.S.
- Party: Federalist
- Relations: Grace Coolidge (cousin)
- Education: Harvard College
- Occupation: Merchant

Benjamin Goodhue (September 20, 1748 (Note: The Goodhue Genealogy states that he was born on "Sept. 20, O. S. or Oct. 1, N. S., 1748.") – July 28, 1814) was a Representative and a Senator from Massachusetts. He supported the Patriots during the American Revolution, and was a strong member of the Federalist Party. He was described by contemporaries as a leading member of the so-called Essex Junto, a group of Massachusetts Federalists, most of whom were from Essex County.

== Biography ==
Benjamin Goodhue was born in Salem in the Province of Massachusetts Bay to Benjamin and Martha (Hardy) Goodue. His father was a blacksmith by trade, but later became a successful merchant. The younger Benjamin graduated from Harvard College in 1766 and joined his father in the merchant business. He remained active as a merchant during the American Revolutionary War, and was a member of the state constitutional conventions of 1779 and 1780, the latter one producing the present Constitution of Massachusetts. He then won election as a state representative to the inaugural Massachusetts House of Representatives in 1780, and was later elected to the state senate, serving in 1783 and 1786–1788. After adoption of the United States Constitution, Goodhue was elected to the First and to the three succeeding Congresses and served from March 4, 1789, until his resignation in June 1796.

Goodhue was a supporter of the strong central government, and joined the Federalist Party when it was organized. He was one of a number of prominent Federalists from Essex County that were described by John Hancock as the "Essex Junto". He was one of two Congressmen who drafted the nation's first revenue code. He served as chairman of the Committee on Commerce and Manufactures in the Fourth United States Congress. He was elected in 1796 to the United States Senate, filling a vacancy caused by the resignation of George Cabot. He was reelected and served from June 11, 1796, to November 8, 1800, when he resigned and retired from public service. He died in Salem on July 28, 1814 and is interred at Broad Street Cemetery.

== Legacy ==
A World War II Liberty ship was named in his honor.

== Notes ==
U.S. House of Representatives
Preceded by None; first in line	Member of the U.S. House of Representatives from Massachusetts's 2nd congressional district March 4, 1789 – March 3, 1793	Succeeded by Dwight Foster, William Lyman, Theodore Sedgwick, Artemas Ward
Preceded by Fisher Ames	Member of the U.S. House of Representatives from Massachusetts's 1st congressional district March 4, 1793 – March 3, 1795 alongside: Fisher Ames, Samuel Dexter, and Samuel Holten on a General ticket	Succeeded by Theodore Sedgwick
Preceded by None; first in line	Member of the U.S. House of Representatives from Massachusetts's 10th congressional district March 4, 1795 – June 1796	Succeeded by Samuel Sewall
U.S. Senate
Preceded by George Cabot	U.S. senator (Class 1) from Massachusetts; 1796–1800; Served alongside: Theodore Sedgwick, Samuel Dexter, Dwight Foster	Succeeded by Jonathan Mason
