= 1794–95 United States House of Representatives elections =

House elections for the 4th U.S. Congress

- August 24, 1794 – September 5, 1795 (Note: "Election dates" does not include states admitted during the 4th Congress.)

All 105 seats in the United States House of Representatives 53 seats needed for a majority
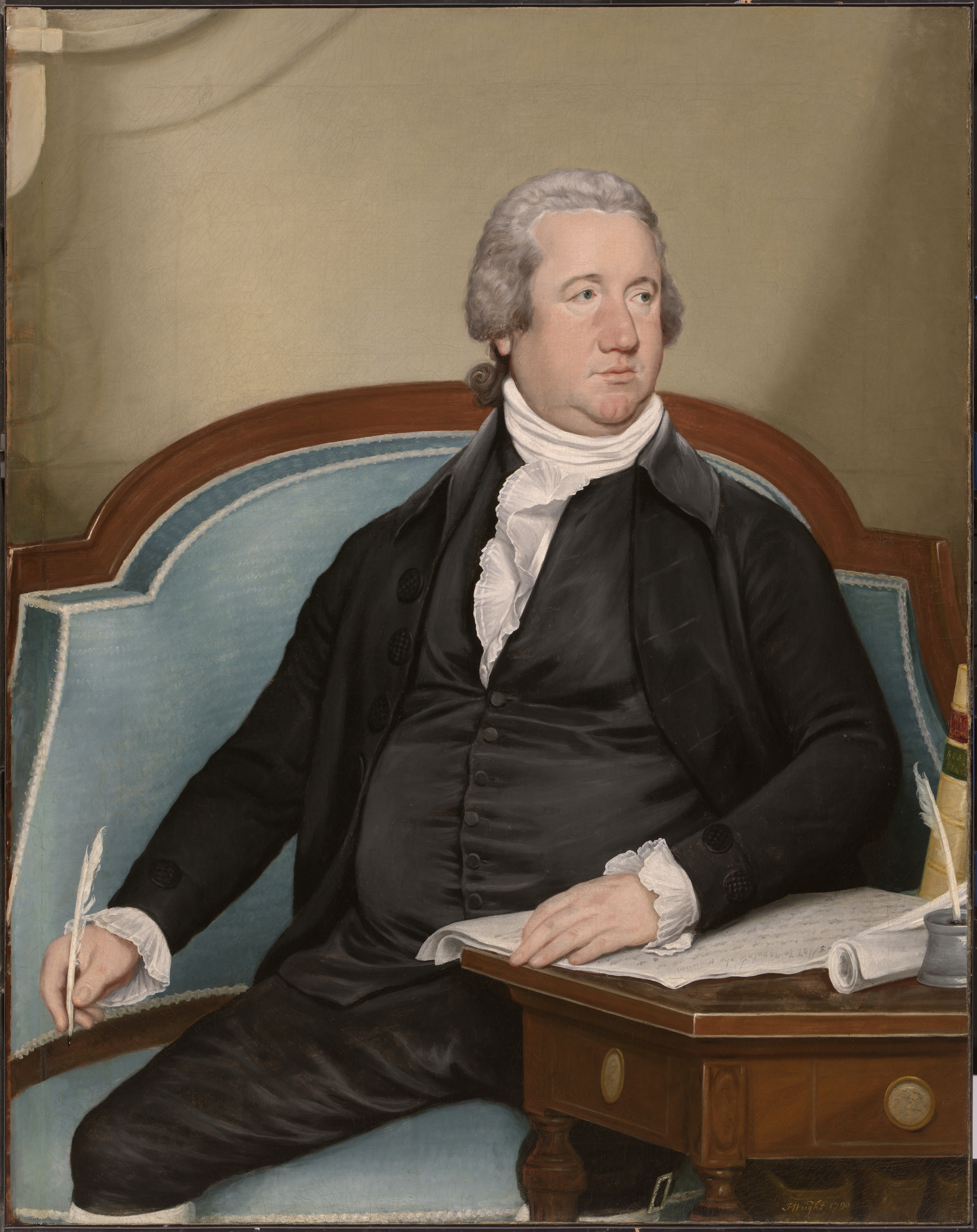

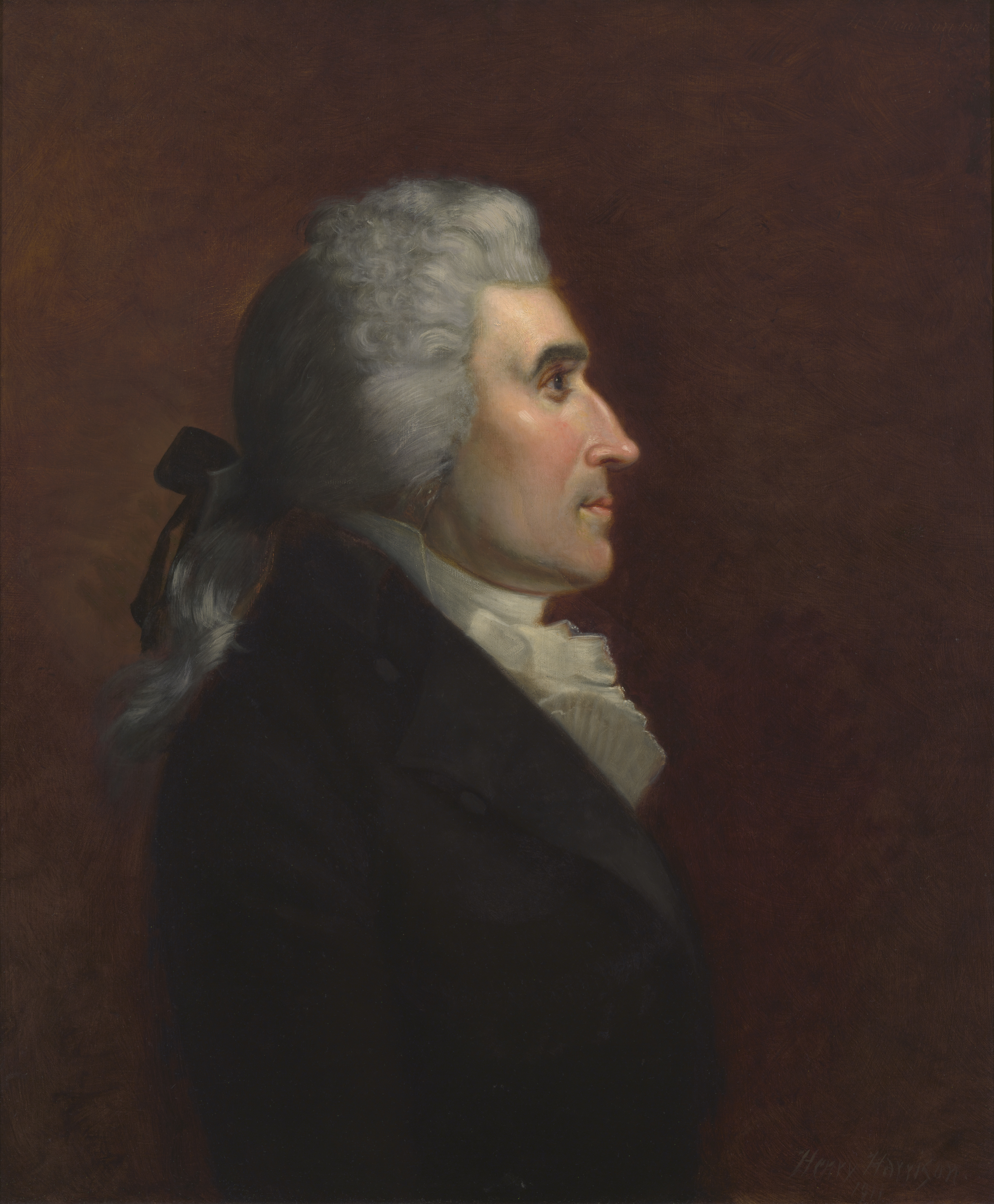
	Majority party	Minority party
Leader	Frederick Muhlenberg	Jonathan Dayton (Note: Federalist Jonathan Dayton was elected Speaker of the House, despite being from the smaller party.)
Party	Democratic-Republican	Federalist
Leader's seat	Pennsylvania 2nd	New Jersey at-large
Last election	54 seats	51 seats
Seats won	59 (Note: Including late elections) (Note: Including the late election from Tennessee who was admitted to the union after the 4th Congress had started to meet, and did not hold their elections for U.S. representatives until October 1796)	47
Seat change	▲5	▼4
- Results: Democratic-Republican hold Democratic-Republican gain Federalist hold Federalist gain Undistricted territory or split plural district
Speaker before election
Frederick Muhlenberg
Pro-Administration
Elected Speaker
Jonathan Dayton
Federalist

The 1794–95 United States House of Representatives elections were held on various dates in various states between August 25, 1794 (New Hampshire), and September 5, 1795 (Kentucky). Each state set its own date for its elections to the House of Representatives before the first session of the 4th United States Congress convened on December 7, 1795. They were held during President George Washington's second term. Elections were held for all 105 seats, representing 15 states.

In the first election for the House of Representatives with organized political parties, the Democratic-Republican Party, which opposed the incumbent Washington Administration, defeated the pro-administration Federalist Party. The outgoing speaker, Frederick Muhlenberg, had supported the pro-administration forces during his first two terms, but was elected by a coalition made up mainly of anti-administration members in 1793, and by 1795 he was seen as more favorable to the Democratic-Republicans. Despite the Democratic-Republican majority, however, Muhlenberg was not re-elected, and was succeeded by Federalist Jonathan Dayton.

== Election summary ==
During this period, each state fixed its own date for a congressional general election. Elections took place both in the even-numbered year before and in the odd-numbered year when a Congress convened. In some states, the congressional delegation was not elected until after the legal start of the Congress (on the 4th day of March in the odd-numbered year).

↓
59	47
Democratic-Republican	Federalist

State	Type	Date	Total seats	Democratic- Republican (formerly Anti-Administration)		Federalist (formerly Pro-Administration)	
State	Type	Date	Total seats	Seats	Change	Seats	Change
Connecticut	At-large	September 15, 1794	7	0	Steady	7	Steady
Delaware	At-large	October 5, 1794	1	1	▲1	0	▼1
Georgia	At-large	October 6, 1794	2	2	Steady	0	Steady
Maryland	Districts	October 6, 1794	8	4	Steady	4	Steady
Massachusetts	Districts	November 3, 1794 (Note: 3 additional ballots were required in 5 districts held January 17, March 23, and June 1, 1795.)	14	3	Steady	11	Steady
New Hampshire	At-large	August 25, 1794 (Note: a run-off was required for the 4th seat held on December 8, 1794.)	4	1	Steady	3	Steady
New Jersey	At-large	December 30, 1794	5	0	Steady	5	Steady
New York	Districts	December 12, 1794	10	5	▲2	5	▼2
Pennsylvania	Districts	October 14, 1794	13	9	▲1	4	▼1
Rhode Island	At-large	August 26, 1794	2	0	Steady	2	Steady
South Carolina	Districts	October 14, 1794	6	4	▼1	2	▲1
Vermont	Districts	December 30, 1794 (Note: an additional ballot was required in both districts held on February 10, 1795.)	2	1	▼1	1	▲1
North Carolina	Districts	February 13, 1795	10	9	Steady	1	Steady
Late elections (After the March 4, 1795 beginning of the next term)
Virginia	Districts	March 16, 1795	19	17	▲2	2	▼2
Kentucky	Districts	September 5, 1795	2	2	Steady	0	Steady
Tennessee	At-large	October 15, 1796	1	1	▲1	0	Steady
Total			106	59 55.2%	▲5	47 44.8%	▼4

House seats
Dem-Republican	55.66%
Federalist	44.34%

== Change in Composition ==
Anti-Administration	Pro-Administration	Vacant
Federalist	Democratic-Republican	Vacant

=== End of the 3rd Congress ===
Anti-Administration →								GA‑AL	GA‑AL	KY‑1	KY‑2	MD‑2	MD‑4	MD‑5	MD‑6	MA‑1	MA‑2	MA‑4	NH‑AL
PA‑AL	PA‑AL	PA‑AL	PA‑AL	PA‑AL	PA‑AL	PA‑AL	NC‑10	NC‑9	NC‑8	NC‑6	NC‑5	NC‑4	NC‑3	NC‑2	NC‑1	NY‑5	NY‑3	NY‑1	NJ‑AL
PA‑AL	SC‑2	SC‑3	SC‑4	SC‑5	VT‑1	VT‑2	VA‑1	VA‑2	VA‑3	VA‑4	VA‑6	VA‑7	VA‑8	VA‑9	VA‑10	VA‑12	VA‑14	VA‑15	VA‑16
Majority →																			VA‑18
NY‑7	NY‑8	NY‑9	NC‑7	PA‑AL	PA‑AL	PA‑AL	PA‑AL	PA‑AL	RI‑AL	RI‑AL	SC‑1	SC‑6	VA‑5	VA‑11	VA‑13	VA‑17	NY‑10	DE‑AL	VA‑19
NY‑6	NY‑4	NY‑2	NJ‑AL	NJ‑AL	NJ‑AL	NJ‑AL	NH‑AL	NH‑AL	NH‑AL	MA‑AL	MA‑4	MA‑4	MA‑3	MA‑3	MA‑2	MA‑2	MA‑2	MA‑1	MA‑1
Pro-Administration →								CT‑AL	CT‑AL	CT‑AL	CT‑AL	CT‑AL	CT‑AL	CT‑AL	MD‑1	MD‑3	MD‑7	MD‑8	MA‑1

=== Beginning of the 4th Congress ===
Democratic-Republican →								DE‑AL	GA‑AL	GA‑AL	KY‑1	KY‑2	MD‑2	MD‑4	MD‑5	MD‑6	MA‑2	MA‑9	MA‑12
PA‑5	PA‑2	PA‑1	NC‑10	NC‑9	NC‑8	NC‑6	NC‑5	NC‑4	NC‑3	NC‑2	NC‑1	NY‑9	NY‑5	NY‑4	NY‑3	NY‑2	NY‑1	NJ‑AL	NH‑AL
PA‑6	PA‑9	PA‑10	PA‑11	PA‑12	SC‑2	SC‑3	SC‑4	SC‑5	VT‑1	VA‑1	VA‑2	VA‑3	VA‑4	VA‑6	VA‑7	VA‑8	VA‑9	VA‑10	VA‑12
Majority →																			VA‑14
NY‑10	NC‑7	PA‑3	PA‑4	PA‑7	PA‑8	RI‑AL	RI‑AL	SC‑1	SC‑6	VT‑2	VA‑5	VA‑11	PA‑4	VA‑13	VA‑17	VA‑19	VA‑18	VA‑16	VA‑15
NY‑8	NY‑7	NY‑6	NJ‑AL	NJ‑AL	NJ‑AL	NJ‑AL	NH‑AL	NH‑AL	NH‑AL	MA‑14	MA‑13	MA‑11	MA‑10	MA‑8	MA‑7	MA‑6	MA‑5	MA‑4	MA‑3
Federalist →								CT‑AL	CT‑AL	CT‑AL	CT‑AL	CT‑AL	CT‑AL	CT‑AL	MD‑1	MD‑3	MD‑7	MD‑8	MA‑1

== Special elections ==
There were special and late elections to the 3rd and 4th Congresses in 1794 and 1795.

=== 3rd Congress ===
District	Incumbent			This race	
District	Member	Party	First elected	Results	Candidates
Maryland 2	John Francis Mercer	Anti- Administration	1791 (special)	Incumbent resigned April 13, 1794. New member elected May 5, 1794. (Note: Date of election.); Anti-Administration hold. Successor also elected to the next term; see below.	▌ ✓ Gabriel Duvall (Anti-Admin.); [data missing]
South Carolina 5	Alexander Gillon	Anti- Administration	1793	Incumbent died October 6, 1794. New member elected October 13–14, 1794. Pro-Administration gain. Successor also elected to the next term; see below.	▌ ✓ Robert Goodloe Harper (Pro-Admin.); ▌William Elliot (Unknown); ▌James Simmons (Unknown)
Maryland 3	Uriah Forrest	Pro- Administration	1792	Incumbent resigned November 8, 1794. New member elected December 8, 1794 and seated in January 1795. Pro-Administration hold. Successor was not elected to the next term; see below.	▌ ✓ Benjamin Edwards (Pro-Admin.) 364 votes; ▌Thomas Turner (Unknown) 281 votes; ▌Richard Hall (Unknown) 24 votes
New Jersey at-large	Abraham Clark	Pro- Administration	1791	Incumbent died September 15, 1794. New member elected January 11, 1795 and seated January 29, 1795. Pro-Administration hold. Successor had already been elected to the next term; see below.	▌ ✓ Aaron Kitchell (Pro-Admin.) 97.1%; ▌Robert Ogden (Unknown) 2.92%
South Carolina 2	John Barnwell	Pro- Administration	1794	Incumbent representative-elect declined to serve. New member elected January 19–20, 1795 and seated December 7, 1795. Anti-Administration gain.	▌ ✓ Wade Hampton (Anti-Admin.) 29.3%; ▌ William Thompson (Unknown) 26.0%; ▌John Rutledge Jr. (Pro-Admin.) 23.7%; ▌William Elliot (Unknown) 20.7%; ▌Andrew Hartley (Unknown) 0.3%

=== 4th Congress ===
District	Incumbent			This race	
District	Member	Party	First elected	Results	Candidates
Connecticut at-large	Jonathan Trumbull Jr.	Federalist	1788	Incumbent Representative-elect declined to serve when elected U.S. Senator. New member elected April 13, 1795 and seated December 7, 1795. Federalist hold.	▌ ✓ Nathaniel Smith (Federalist) 39.5%; ▌James Davenport (Federalist) 19.2%; ▌Samuel W. Dana (Federalist) 15.8%; ▌William Edmond (Federalist) 7.4%; ▌John Allen (Federalist) 6.9%; ▌David Daggett (Federalist) 6.4%; ▌John Treadwell (Federalist) 4.7%
North Carolina 4	Alexander Mebane	Democratic- Republican	1793	Incumbent died July 5, 1795. New member elected August 14, 1795 and seated December 7, 1795. Democratic-Republican hold.	▌ ✓ Absalom Tatom (Democratic-Republican); ▌Ambrose Ramsey (Democratic-Republican); ▌Richard Stanford (Democratic-Republican); ▌George Roberts (Unknown); ▌William Sheppard (Unknown)

== Connecticut ==
District	Incumbent			This race	
District	Member	Party	First elected	Results	Candidates
Connecticut at-large 7 seats on a General ticket	James Hillhouse	Pro-Administration	1790	Incumbent re-elected as a Federalist.	▌ ✓ Jonathan Trumbull Jr. (Federalist) 13.1%; ▌ ✓ Uriah Tracy (Federalist) 12.5%; ▌ ✓ James Hillhouse (Federalist) 12.4%; ▌ ✓ Joshua Coit (Federalist) 10.8%; ▌ ✓ Roger Griswold (Federalist) 10.2%; ▌ ✓ Zephaniah Swift (Federalist) 9.7%; ▌ ✓ Chauncey Goodrich (Federalist) 6.7%; ▌Nathaniel Smith (Federalist) 5.7%; ▌James Davenport (Federalist) 5.1%; ▌Samuel W. Dana (Federalist) 3.7%; ▌William Edmond (Federalist) 3.4%; ▌John Allen (Federalist) 2.5%; ▌John Treadwell (Federalist) 2.3%; ▌David Daggett (Federalist) 2.2%
Connecticut at-large 7 seats on a General ticket	Amasa Learned	Pro-Administration	1790	Incumbent retired.	
Connecticut at-large 7 seats on a General ticket	Joshua Coit	Pro-Administration	1792	Incumbent re-elected as a Federalist.	
Connecticut at-large 7 seats on a General ticket	Jonathan Trumbull Jr.	Pro-Administration	1788	Incumbent retired to run for U.S. Senator.	
Connecticut at-large 7 seats on a General ticket	Jeremiah Wadsworth	Pro-Administration	1788	Incumbent retired.	
Connecticut at-large 7 seats on a General ticket	Zephaniah Swift	Pro-Administration	1792	Incumbent re-elected as a Federalist.	
Connecticut at-large 7 seats on a General ticket	Uriah Tracy	Pro-Administration	1792	Incumbent re-elected as a Federalist.	

== Delaware ==
Only two candidates are recorded for Delaware's congressional election in 1794, suggesting that the voting procedure in place for the first three Congresses for two candidates had been changed.

District	Incumbent			This race	
District	Member	Party	First elected	Results	Candidates
Delaware at-large	Henry Latimer	Pro- Administration	1792	Incumbent lost re-election. Democratic-Republican gain.	▌ ✓ John Patten (Democratic-Republican) 51.3%; ▌Henry Latimer (Federalist) 48.7%

== Georgia ==
District	Incumbent			This race	
District	Member	Party	First elected	Results	Candidates
Georgia at-large 2 seats on a General ticket	Abraham Baldwin	Anti- Administration	1789	Incumbent re-elected as a Democratic-Republican.	▌ ✓ John Milledge (Democratic-Republican) 20.6%; ▌ ✓ Abraham Baldwin (Democratic-Republican) 19.3%; ▌Thomas P. Carnes (Democratic-Republican) 16.0%; ▌Jacob B. Waldburber (Federalist) 15.9%; ▌James Sims (Democratic-Republican) 13.1%; ▌Francis Willis (Democratic-Republican) 10.6%; ▌Lachlan McIntosh (Unknown) 4.0%; ▌James Adcock (Unknown) 0.5%
Georgia at-large 2 seats on a General ticket	Thomas P. Carnes	Anti- Administration	1792	Incumbent lost re-election.	▌ ✓ John Milledge (Democratic-Republican) 20.6%; ▌ ✓ Abraham Baldwin (Democratic-Republican) 19.3%; ▌Thomas P. Carnes (Democratic-Republican) 16.0%; ▌Jacob B. Waldburber (Federalist) 15.9%; ▌James Sims (Democratic-Republican) 13.1%; ▌Francis Willis (Democratic-Republican) 10.6%; ▌Lachlan McIntosh (Unknown) 4.0%; ▌James Adcock (Unknown) 0.5%

== Kentucky ==
District	Incumbent			This race	
District	Member	Party	First elected	Results	Candidates
Kentucky 1 "Southern District"	Christopher Greenup	Anti- Administration	1792	Incumbent re-elected as a Democratic-Republican.	▌ ✓ Christopher Greenup (Democratic-Republican) (Note: Source does not give numbers of votes or has incomplete data.)
Kentucky 2 "Northern District"	Alexander D. Orr	Anti- Administration	1792	Incumbent re-elected as a Democratic-Republican.	▌ ✓ Alexander D. Orr (Democratic-Republican)

== Maryland ==
District	Incumbent			This race	
District	Member	Party	First elected	Results	Candidates
Maryland 1	George Dent	Pro-Administration	1792	Incumbent re-elected as a Federalist.	▌ ✓ George Dent (Federalist) 67.6%; ▌Philip Key (Federalist) 32.4%
Maryland 2	John Francis Mercer	Anti-Administration	1791 (Special)	Incumbent resigned April 13, 1794. Successor also elected to finish the term.	▌ ✓ Gabriel Duvall (Democratic-Republican) 69.5%; ▌Richard A. Contee (Federalist) 30.5%
Maryland 3	Uriah Forrest	Pro-Administration	1792	Incumbent retired.	▌ ✓ Jeremiah Crabb (Federalist) 100%
Maryland 4	Thomas Sprigg	Anti-Administration	1792	Incumbent re-elected as a Democratic-Republican.	▌ ✓ Thomas Sprigg (Democratic-Republican) 61.4%; ▌Roger Nelson (Federalist) 38.6%
Maryland 5	Samuel Smith	Anti-Administration	1792	Incumbent re-elected as a Democratic-Republican.	▌ ✓ Samuel Smith (Democratic-Republican)
Maryland 6	Gabriel Christie	Anti-Administration	1792	Incumbent re-elected as a Democratic-Republican.	▌ ✓ Gabriel Christie (Democratic-Republican) 70.4%; ▌Robert Wright (Federalist) 29.6%
Maryland 7	William Hindman	Pro-Administration	1792	Incumbent re-elected as a Federalist.	▌ ✓ William Hindman (Federalist) 63.8%; ▌George Jackson (Democratic-Republican) 26.8%; ▌William Whitely (Democratic-Republican) 9.3%
Maryland 8	William V. Murray	Pro-Administration	1790	Incumbent re-elected as a Federalist.	▌ ✓ William V. Murray (Federalist) 100%

== Massachusetts ==
Massachusetts redistricted between the 3rd and 4th Congress, dividing itself into 14 districts. The 12th-14th districts were in the District of Maine (the modern State of Maine). A majority was required for election. Additional ballots were required in five districts due to the majority requirement not being met on the first ballot.

District	Incumbent			This race	
District	Member	Party	First elected	Results	Candidates
Massachusetts 1 "1st Western"	Theodore Sedgwick; Redistricted from the 2nd district	Pro- Administration	1789	Incumbent re-elected as a Federalist.	▌ ✓ Theodore Sedgwick (Federalist) 53.8%; ▌Thomson J. Skinner (Democratic-Republican) 46.2%
Massachusetts 2 "2nd Western"	William Lyman	Anti- Administration	1792	Incumbent re-elected as a Democratic-Republican.	▌ ✓ William Lyman (Democratic-Republican) 52.1%; ▌William Shepard (Federalist) 47.9%
Massachusetts 3 "3rd Western"	None (new district)			New seat. Federalist gain.	▌ ✓ Samuel Lyman (Federalist) 65.5%; ▌Daniel Bigelow (Democratic-Republican) 34.5%
Massachusetts 4 "4th Western"	Dwight Foster; Redistricted from the 2nd district	Pro- Administration	1792	Incumbent re-elected as a Federalist.	▌ ✓ Dwight Foster (Federalist) 50.8%; ▌Levi Lincoln Sr. (Democratic-Republican) 46.1%; ▌Samuel Blackburn (Unknown) 3.1%
Massachusetts 5 "1st Southern"	Peleg Coffin Jr. Redistricted from the 3rd district	Pro- Administration	1792	Incumbent lost re-election.	▌ ✓ Nathaniel Freeman Jr. (Federalist) 70.0%; ▌Peleg Coffin Jr. (Federalist) 30.0%
Massachusetts 6 "2nd Southern"	None (new district)			New seat. Federalist gain.	▌ ✓ John Reed Sr. (Federalist) 64.6%; ▌George Partridge (Democratic-Republican) 22.1%; ▌John Davis (Unknown) 8.7%
Massachusetts 7 "3rd Southern"	David Cobb; Redistricted from the at-large seat	Pro- Administration	1792	Incumbent lost re-election.	First ballot (November 3, 1794): ▌David Cobb (Federalist) 42.3%; ▌George Leonard (Federalist) 35.8%; ▌Phanuel Bishop (Democratic-Republican) 21.9%; Second ballot (January 17, 1795): ▌David Cobb (Federalist) 39.9%; ▌George Leonard (Federalist) 39.9%; ▌Phanuel Bishop (Democratic-Republican) 20.2%; Third ballot (March 23, 1795): ▌George Leonard (Federalist) 48.9%; ▌David Cobb (Federalist) 17.4%; ▌John Smith (Unknown) 13.7%; ▌Phanuel Bishop (Democratic-Republican) 12.5%; Scattering 7.6%; Fourth ballot (June 1, 1795); ▌ ✓ George Leonard (Federalist) 76.3%; ▌Elisha May (Federalist) 16.5%; ▌Phanuel Bishop (Democratic-Republican) 7.2%
Massachusetts 8 "1st Middle"	Fisher Ames; Redistricted from the 1st district	Pro- Administration	1788	Incumbent re-elected as a Federalist.	▌ ✓ Fisher Ames (Federalist) 56.6%; ▌Charles Jarvis (Democratic-Republican) 43.4%
Massachusetts 9 "2nd Middle"	Samuel Dexter; Redistricted from the 1st district	Pro- Administration	1792	Incumbent lost re-election. Democratic-Republican gain. Election unsuccessfully challenged. (Note: A petition by various citizens of Massachusetts contested the election. The Committee on Elections ruled in the winner's favor and added "that the attempt to deprive him of his seat was rather the act of malevolence than a desire to promote the public good." On January 25, 1797, these words were stricken out and expressions of compliment to the member were substituted, and the report was agreed to.)	First ballot (November 3, 1794): ▌Samuel Dexter (Federalist) 40.5%; ▌Elbridge Gerry (Democratic-Republican) 30.9%; ▌Joseph Bradley Varnum (Democratic-Republican) 28.6%; Second ballot (January 17, 1795): ▌Joseph Bradley Varnum (Democratic-Republican) 49.4%; ▌Samuel Dexter (Federalist) 48.8%; Scattering 1.8%; Third ballot (March 23, 1795); ▌ ✓ Joseph Bradley Varnum (Democratic-Republican) 51.4%; ▌Samuel Dexter (Federalist) 48.6%
Massachusetts 10 "3rd Middle"	Benjamin Goodhue; Redistricted from the 1st district	Pro- Administration	1789	Incumbent re-elected as a Federalist.	▌ ✓ Benjamin Goodhue (Federalist) 68.2%; ▌Samuel Holten (Federalist) (Note: Changed parties) 31.8%
Massachusetts 10 "3rd Middle"	Samuel Holten; Redistricted from the 1st district	Anti- Administration	1792	Incumbent lost re-election. Federalist loss.	▌ ✓ Benjamin Goodhue (Federalist) 68.2%; ▌Samuel Holten (Federalist) 31.8%
Massachusetts 11 "4th Middle"	None (new district)			New seat. Federalist gain.	First ballot (November 3, 1794): ▌Theophilus Bradbury (Federalist) 43.5%; ▌Bailey Bartlett (Federalist) 19.8%; ▌Josiah Smith (Democratic-Republican) 10.5%; ▌Stephen Cross (Unknown) 9.1%; ▌Theophilus Parsons (Federalist) 7.0%; Scattering 10.1%; Second ballot (January 17, 1795): ▌Theophilus Bradbury (Federalist) 38.1%; ▌William Pearson (Unknown) 36.6%; ▌Bailey Bartlett (Federalist) 25.3%; Third ballot (March 23, 1795); ▌ ✓ Theophilus Bradbury (Federalist) 100%
Massachusetts 12 District of Maine "1st Eastern"	Henry Dearborn; Redistricted from the 4th district	Anti- Administration	1792	Incumbent re-elected as a Democratic-Republican.	▌ ✓ Henry Dearborn (Democratic-Republican) 51.2%; ▌Jonathan Bowman (Federalist) 28.7%; ▌Daniel Coney (Federalist) 5.6%; ▌Isaac Parker (Federalist) 5.5%; Scattering 8.9%
Massachusetts 13 District of Maine "2nd Eastern"	Peleg Wadsworth; Redistricted from the 4th district	Pro- Administration	1792	Incumbent re-elected as a Federalist.	First ballot (November 3, 1794): ▌Peleg Wadsworth (Federalist) 44.1%; ▌William Widgery (Democratic-Republican) 33.4%; ▌Stephen Longfellow (Unknown) 10.0%; ▌Samuel Thompson (Unknown) 5.3%; Scattering 7.3%; Second ballot (January 17, 1795); ▌ ✓ Peleg Wadsworth (Federalist) 52.0%; ▌William Widgery (Democratic-Republican) 34.2%; ▌William Martin (Unknown) 5.9%; Scattering 7.9%
Massachusetts 14 District of Maine "3rd Eastern"	George Thatcher; Redistricted from the 4th district	Pro- Administration	1788	Incumbent re-elected as a Federalist.	First ballot (November 3, 1794): ▌George Thatcher (Federalist) 45.7%; ▌Nathaniel Wells (Federalist) 31.6%; ▌Ichabod Godwin (Unknown) 8.8%; ▌Joseph Tucker (Unknown) 6.4%; Scattering 7.4%; Second ballot (January 17, 1795); ▌ ✓ George Thatcher (Federalist) 68.4%; ▌Nathaniel Wells (Federalist) 20.5%; ▌Joseph Tucker (Unknown) 6.5%

== New Hampshire ==
Under New Hampshire's electoral laws, a majority of voters (12.5% of votes) was required for election. Only three candidates achieved a majority, and so a run-off election was held for the fourth seat.

District	Incumbent			This race	
District	Member	Party	First elected	Results	Candidates
New Hampshire at-large (General ticket)	Jeremiah Smith	Pro-Administration	1790	Incumbent re-elected as a Federalist.	First ballot (August 25, 1794): ▌ ✓ Jeremiah Smith (Federalist) 20.5%; ▌ ✓ John S. Sherburne (Democratic-Republican) 17.2%; ▌ ✓ Nicholas Gilman (Federalist) 13.0%; ▌Abiel Foster (Federalist) 11.1%; ▌Paine Wingate (Federalist) 8.1%; Others 30.1%; Second ballot (December 8, 1794); ▌ ✓ Abiel Foster (Federalist) 82.7%; ▌Paine Wingate (Federalist) 17.3%
New Hampshire at-large (General ticket)	John S. Sherburne	Anti-Administration	1792	Incumbent re-elected as a Democratic-Republican.	First ballot (August 25, 1794): ▌ ✓ Jeremiah Smith (Federalist) 20.5%; ▌ ✓ John S. Sherburne (Democratic-Republican) 17.2%; ▌ ✓ Nicholas Gilman (Federalist) 13.0%; ▌Abiel Foster (Federalist) 11.1%; ▌Paine Wingate (Federalist) 8.1%; Others 30.1%; Second ballot (December 8, 1794); ▌ ✓ Abiel Foster (Federalist) 82.7%; ▌Paine Wingate (Federalist) 17.3%
New Hampshire at-large (General ticket)	Nicholas Gilman	Pro-Administration	1788/89	Incumbent re-elected as a Federalist.	First ballot (August 25, 1794): ▌ ✓ Jeremiah Smith (Federalist) 20.5%; ▌ ✓ John S. Sherburne (Democratic-Republican) 17.2%; ▌ ✓ Nicholas Gilman (Federalist) 13.0%; ▌Abiel Foster (Federalist) 11.1%; ▌Paine Wingate (Federalist) 8.1%; Others 30.1%; Second ballot (December 8, 1794); ▌ ✓ Abiel Foster (Federalist) 82.7%; ▌Paine Wingate (Federalist) 17.3%
New Hampshire at-large (General ticket)	Paine Wingate	Pro-Administration	1792	Incumbent lost re-election.	First ballot (August 25, 1794): ▌ ✓ Jeremiah Smith (Federalist) 20.5%; ▌ ✓ John S. Sherburne (Democratic-Republican) 17.2%; ▌ ✓ Nicholas Gilman (Federalist) 13.0%; ▌Abiel Foster (Federalist) 11.1%; ▌Paine Wingate (Federalist) 8.1%; Others 30.1%; Second ballot (December 8, 1794); ▌ ✓ Abiel Foster (Federalist) 82.7%; ▌Paine Wingate (Federalist) 17.3%

== New Jersey ==
District	Incumbent			This race	
District	Member	Party	First elected	Results	Candidates
New Jersey at-large (General ticket)	Elias Boudinot	Pro- Administration	1789	Incumbent retired.	▌ ✓ Jonathan Dayton (Federalist) 13.6%; ▌ ✓ Aaron Kitchell (Federalist) 11.0%; ▌ ✓ Thomas Henderson (Federalist) 9.3%; ▌ ✓ Isaac Smith (Federalist) 7.9%; ▌ ✓ Mark Thomson (Federalist) 7.9%; ▌Thomas Sinnickson (Federalist) 7.5%; ▌Joseph Bloomfield (Democratic-Republican) 6.6%; ▌John Beatty (Federalist) 6.4%; ▌James Linn (Democratic-Republican) 6.3%; ▌Ebenezer Elmer (Democratic-Republican) 5.8%; ▌James Schureman (Federalist) 4.1%; ▌Lambert Cadwalader (Federalist) 4.0%; ▌Richard Smith (Unknown) 3.0%; Others: ▌Charles Stewart (Unknown) 2.3%; ▌Jonathan Elmer (Federalist) 2.1%; ▌John Harring (Unknown) 1.4%; ▌Robert Ogden (Unknown) 0.7%; ▌James F. Armstrong (Unknown) 0.2%
New Jersey at-large (General ticket)	Vacant			Abraham Clark (Pro-Admin.) died September 15, 1794.	
New Jersey at-large (General ticket)	Jonathan Dayton	Pro- Administration	1791	Incumbent re-elected as a Federalist.	
New Jersey at-large (General ticket)	Lambert Cadwalader	Pro- Administration	1789; 1792	Incumbent lost re-election.	
New Jersey at-large (General ticket)	John Beatty	Pro- Administration	1792	Incumbent lost re-election.	

== New York ==
New York's districts were not numbered at the time, but were later numbered retroactively.

District	Incumbent			This race	
District	Member	Party	First elected	Results	Candidates
New York 1	Vacant			Incumbent moved to the 7th district. New member elected.	▌ ✓ Jonathan Nicoll Havens (Democratic-Republican) 38.6%; ▌Whitehead Cornwell (Democratic-Republican) 26.2%; ▌Samuel Jones (Federalist) 23.4%; ▌John Smith (Democratic-Republican) 11.9%
New York 2	John Watts	Pro-Administration	1793	Incumbent lost re-election. Democratic-Republican gain.	▌ ✓ Edward Livingston (Democratic-Republican) 52.9%; ▌John Watts (Federalist) 47.1%
New York 3	Philip Van Cortlandt	Anti-Administration	1793	Incumbent re-elected as a Democratic-Republican.	▌ ✓ Philip Van Cortlandt (Democratic-Republican) 50.5%; ▌Richard Morris (Federalist) 49.5%
New York 4	Peter Van Gaasbeck	Pro-Administration	1793	Incumbent retired. Democratic-Republican gain.	▌ ✓ John Hathorn (Democratic-Republican) 70.8%; ▌Conrad E. Elmendorf (Federalist) 27.2%; ▌William Thompson (Federalist) 1.9%; ▌Peter Gansevoort (Democratic-Republican) 0.1%
New York 5	Theodorus Bailey	Anti-Administration	1793	Incumbent re-elected as a Democratic-Republican.	▌ ✓ Theodorus Bailey (Democratic-Republican) 57.1%; ▌David Brooks (Federalist) 42.9%
New York 6	Ezekiel Gilbert	Pro-Administration	1793	Incumbent re-elected as a Federalist.	▌ ✓ Ezekiel Gilbert (Federalist) 57.6%; ▌John Bay (Democratic-Republican) 21.7%; ▌Matthew Adgate (Democratic-Republican) 20.7%
New York 7	John E. Van Alen	Pro-Administration	1793	Incumbent re-elected as a Federalist.	▌ ✓ John E. Van Alen (Federalist) 78.8%; ▌Thomas Tredwell (Democratic-Republican) 21.2%
New York 7	Thomas Tredwell; Moved from the 1st district	Anti-Administration	1791 (special)	Incumbent lost re-election. Democratic-Republican loss.	▌ ✓ John E. Van Alen (Federalist) 78.8%; ▌Thomas Tredwell (Democratic-Republican) 21.2%
New York 8	Henry Glen	Pro-Administration	1793	Incumbent re-elected as a Federalist.	▌ ✓ Henry Glen (Federalist) 94.0%; ▌Abraham Yates (Democratic-Republican) 2.8%; ▌John Tayler (Democratic-Republican) 2.6%; ▌James Fairlie (Democratic-Republican) 0.6%
New York 9	James Gordon	Pro-Administration	1790	Incumbent retired. Federalist hold.	▌ ✓ John Williams (Federalist) 48.4%; ▌Ebenezer Russel (Federalist) 40.2%; ▌Alexander Webster (Democratic-Republican) 11.4%
New York 10	Vacant			Incumbent Silas Talbot (Pro-Admin.) resigned to accept an appointment to the Navy.	▌ ✓ William Cooper (Federalist) 55.9%; ▌John Winn (Democratic-Republican) 31.4%; ▌James Cochran (Federalist) 11.8%; ▌Jonathan Fitch (Democratic-Republican) 0.9%

== North Carolina ==
District	Incumbent			This race	
District	Member	Party	First elected	Results	Candidates
North Carolina 1	Joseph McDowell	Anti-Administration	1793	Incumbent lost re-election.	▌ ✓ James Holland (Democratic-Republican); ▌Joseph McDowell (Democratic-Republican)
North Carolina 2	Matthew Locke	Anti-Administration	1793	Incumbent re-elected as a Democratic-Republican.	▌ ✓ Matthew Locke (Democratic-Republican) 100%
North Carolina 3	Joseph Winston	Anti-Administration	1793	Incumbent lost re-election.	▌ ✓ Jesse Franklin (Democratic-Republican); ▌Joseph Winston (Democratic-Republican)
North Carolina 4	Alexander Mebane	Anti-Administration	1793	Incumbent re-elected as a Democratic-Republican.	▌ ✓ Alexander Mebane (Democratic-Republican) 75.8%; ▌Samuel Benton (Federalist) 19.5%; ▌Stephen Moore (Federalist) 4.7%
North Carolina 5	Nathaniel Macon	Anti-Administration	1791	Incumbent re-elected as a Democratic-Republican.	▌ ✓ Nathaniel Macon (Democratic-Republican) 100%
North Carolina 6	James Gillespie	Anti-Administration	1793	Incumbent re-elected as a Democratic-Republican.	▌ ✓ James Gillespie (Democratic-Republican); ▌William H. Hill (Federalist)
North Carolina 7	William B. Grove	Pro-Administration	1791	Incumbent re-elected as a Federalist.	▌ ✓ William B. Grove (Federalist) 100%
North Carolina 8	William J. Dawson	Anti-Administration	1793	Incumbent lost re-election.	▌ ✓ Dempsey Burgess (Democratic-Republican); ▌John Baker (Democratic-Republican); ▌Clement Hale (Democratic-Republican); ▌David Stone (Federalist); ▌William J. Dawson (Democratic-Republican); ▌Charles Johnson (Federalist)
North Carolina 9	Thomas Blount	Anti-Administration	1793	Incumbent re-elected as a Democratic-Republican.	▌ ✓ Thomas Blount (Democratic-Republican); ▌John Benford (Federalist); ▌Willis Alston (Federalist)
North Carolina 10	Benjamin Williams	Anti-Administration	1793	Incumbent lost re-election as a Federalist.	▌ ✓ Nathan Bryan (Democratic-Republican) 61.0%; ▌Benjamin Williams (Federalist) 29.6%; ▌David Witherspoon (Federalist) 9.4%

== Pennsylvania ==
Pennsylvania once again divided itself into districts instead of electing representatives at-large, as it had for the 3rd Congress. The state divided intself into 12 districts, one of which (the 4th) had two seats. Pennsylvania would continue to use one or more plural districts until 1842.

District	Incumbent			This race	
District	Member	Party	First elected	Results	Candidates
Pennsylvania 1	Thomas Fitzsimons; Redistricted from the at-large district	Pro- Administration	1788	Incumbent lost re-election. Democratic-Republican gain.	▌ ✓ John Swanwick (Democratic-Republican) 51.2%; ▌Thomas Fitzsimons (Federalist) 48.8%
Pennsylvania 2	Frederick Muhlenberg; Redistricted from at-large district	Anti- Administration	1788	Incumbent re-elected as a Democratic-Republican.	▌ ✓ Frederick Muhlenberg (Democratic-Republican) 56.3%; ▌Samuel Miles (Federalist) 43.7%
Pennsylvania 3	None (new district)			New seat. Federalist gain.	▌ ✓ Richard Thomas (Federalist) 68.2%; ▌Thomas Ross (Democratic-Republican) 31.8%
Pennsylvania 4 Plural district with 2 seats	None (new district)			New seat. Federalist gain.	▌ ✓ Samuel Sitgreaves (Federalist) 36.2%; ▌ ✓ John Richards (Democratic-Republican) 20.0%; ▌James Morris (Democratic-Republican) 20.2%; ▌Robert Lollar (Democratic-Republican) 13.1%; ▌Peter Muhlenberg (Democratic-Republican) 8.1%; ▌James Barclay (Unknown) 2.4%
Pennsylvania 4 Plural district with 2 seats	Peter Muhlenberg; Redistricted from the at-large district	Anti- Administration	1788; 1792	Incumbent lost re-election. James Morris unsuccessfully disputed the election. (Note: The original returns showed Morris in 2nd place and Richards in a close 3rd place, but Richards disputed it. Morris died July 10, 1795, before the House could act. The Elections Committee ruled in favor of Richards on January 18, 1796.)	▌ ✓ Samuel Sitgreaves (Federalist) 36.2%; ▌ ✓ John Richards (Democratic-Republican) 20.0%; ▌James Morris (Democratic-Republican) 20.2%; ▌Robert Lollar (Democratic-Republican) 13.1%; ▌Peter Muhlenberg (Democratic-Republican) 8.1%; ▌James Barclay (Unknown) 2.4%
Pennsylvania 5	Daniel Hiester; Redistricted from at-large district	Anti- Administration	1788	Incumbent re-elected as a Democratic-Republican.	▌ ✓ Daniel Hiester (Democratic-Republican)
Pennsylvania 6	None (new district)			New seat. Democratic-Republican gain.	▌ ✓ Samuel Maclay (Democratic-Republican) 46.0%; ▌John A. Hanna (Democratic-Republican) 43.3%; ▌John Carson (Federalist) 10.7%
Pennsylvania 7	John W. Kittera; Redistricted from at-large district	Pro- Administration	1791	Incumbent re-elected as a Federalist.	▌ ✓ John W. Kittera (Federalist); Unopposed
Pennsylvania 8	Thomas Hartley; Redistricted from at-large district	Pro- Administration	1788	Incumbent re-elected as a Federalist.	▌ ✓ Thomas Hartley (Federalist); Unopposed
Pennsylvania 9	Andrew Gregg; Redistricted from at-large district	Anti- Administration	1791	Incumbent re-elected as a Democratic-Republican.	▌ ✓ Andrew Gregg (Democratic-Republican); ▌James Wallace (Federalist); ▌William Irvine (Democratic-Republican)
Pennsylvania 9	William Irvine; Redistricted from the at-large district	Anti- Administration	1792	Incumbent lost re-election. Democratic-Republican loss.	▌ ✓ Andrew Gregg (Democratic-Republican); ▌James Wallace (Federalist); ▌William Irvine (Democratic-Republican)
Pennsylvania 10	None (new district)			New seat. Democratic-Republican gain.	▌ ✓ David Bard (Democratic-Republican) 52.9%; ▌James McLane (Democratic-Republican) 31.9%; ▌James Chambers (Federalist) 15.2%
Pennsylvania 11	William Findley; Redistricted from at-large district	Anti- Administration	1791	Incumbent re-elected as a Democratic-Republican.	▌ ✓ William Findley (Democratic-Republican); Unopposed
Pennsylvania 12	Thomas Scott; Redistricted from at-large district	Pro- Administration	1788; 1792	Incumbent lost re-election. Democratic-Republican gain.	▌ ✓ Albert Gallatin (Democratic-Republican) 33.1%; ▌Thomas Scott (Federalist) 27.7%; ▌Daniel Hamilton (Democratic-Republican) 16.2%; ▌Isaac Tichenor (Federalist) 11.0%; ▌Hugh H. Brackenridge (DR?) 6.0%; ▌John Woods (Federalist) 5.9%

== Rhode Island ==
District	Incumbent			This race	
District	Member	Party	First elected	Results	Candidates
Rhode Island at-large Seat A	Benjamin Bourne	Pro- Administration	1790	Incumbent re-elected as a Federalist.	▌ ✓ Benjamin Bourne (Federalist) 62.3%; ▌Peleg Arnold (Democratic-Republican) 37.7%
Rhode Island at-large Seat B	Francis Malbone	Pro- Administration	1792	Incumbent re-elected as a Federalist.	▌ ✓ Francis Malbone (Federalist) 61.9%; ▌Joseph Stanton Jr. (Democratic-Republican) 38.1%

== South Carolina ==
Electoral data are only available for the 1st and 5th district of South Carolina's 6 districts at the time of the elections of 1794.

District	Incumbent			This race	
District	Member	Party	First elected	Results	Candidates
South Carolina 1	William L. Smith	Pro-Administration	1788	Incumbent re-elected as a Federalist.	▌ ✓ William L. Smith (Federalist) 51.7%; ▌John Rutledge Jr. (Federalist) 37.3%; ▌Thomas Tucker (Democratic-Republican) 11.0%
South Carolina 2	None (new district)			Winner declined to serve. A special election was held to fill the resulting vacancy; see above.	▌ ✓ John Barnwell (Federalist)
South Carolina 3	Lemuel Benton	Anti-Administration	1793	Incumbent re-elected as a Democratic-Republican.	▌ ✓ Lemuel Benton (Democratic-Republican)
South Carolina 4	Richard Winn	Anti-Administration	1793	Incumbent re-elected as a Democratic-Republican.	▌ ✓ Richard Winn (Democratic-Republican)
South Carolina 5	Alexander Gillon	Anti-Administration	1793	Incumbent died October 6, 1794. Federalist gain. Successor also elected to finish the term; see above.	▌ ✓ Robert Goodloe Harper (Federalist) 58.3%; ▌John Hunter (Democratic-Republican) 41.7%
South Carolina 5	John Hunter (Moved from the 2nd district)	Anti-Administration	1793	Incumbent lost re-election. Anti-Administration loss.	▌ ✓ Robert Goodloe Harper (Federalist) 58.3%; ▌John Hunter (Democratic-Republican) 41.7%
South Carolina 6	Andrew Pickens	Anti-Administration	1793	Unknown if incumbent retired or lost re-election.	▌ ✓ Samuel Earle (Democratic-Republican)

Representative-elect Barnwell of the 2nd district declined to serve. A special election was held to fill the resulting vacancy, electing Wade Hampton (Democratic-Republican).

== Southwest Territory ==
See Non-voting delegates, below.

== Vermont ==
Vermont law required a majority for election to Congress, with a second election to be held if the first did not return a majority. Run-off elections were required in both districts.

District	Incumbent			This race	
District	Member	Party	First elected	Results	Candidates
Vermont 1 "Western District"	Israel Smith	Anti- Administration	1791	Incumbent re-elected as a Democratic-Republican. The election was contested but eventually upheld.	First ballot (December 30, 1794): ▌Matthew Lyon (Democratic-Republican) 41.7%; ▌Israel Smith (Democratic-Republican) 32.9%; ▌Isaac Tichenor (Federalist) 9.9%; ▌Gideon Olin (Democratic-Republican) 8.7%; Others 6.8%; Second ballot (February 10, 1795): ▌ ✓ Israel Smith (Democratic-Republican) 48.5%; ▌Matthew Lyon (Democratic-Republican) 48.0%; Others 3.5%
Vermont 2 "Eastern District"	Nathaniel Niles	Anti- Administration	1791	Incumbent lost re-election. Federalist gain.	First ballot (December 30, 1794): ▌Nathaniel Niles (Democratic-Republican) 31.6%; ▌Daniel Buck (Federalist) 21.2%; ▌Jonathan Hunt (Unknown) 11.0%; ▌Stephen Jacob (Unknown) 10.9%; ▌Lewis R. Morris (Federalist) 8.3%; ▌Cornelius Lynde (Unknown) 4.7%; ▌Paul Brigham (Democratic-Republican) 3.3%; ▌Lot Hall (Unknown) 2.7%; ▌Elijah Robinson (Unknown) 1.3%; Others 4.8%; Second ballot (February 10, 1795): ▌ ✓ Daniel Buck (Federalist) 55.6%; ▌Nathaniel Niles (Democratic-Republican) 39.1%; ▌Jonathan Hunt (Unknown) 2.3%; ▌Stephen Jacob (Unknown) 1.8%; Others 1.2%

== Virginia ==
District	Incumbent			This race	
District	Member	Party	First elected	Results	Candidates
Virginia 1	Robert Rutherford	Anti-Administration	1793	Incumbent re-elected as a Democratic-Republican.	▌ ✓ Robert Rutherford (Democratic-Republican); ▌Daniel Morgan (Federalist)
Virginia 2	Andrew Moore	Anti-Administration	1789	Incumbent re-elected as a Democratic-Republican.	▌ ✓ Andrew Moore (Democratic-Republican) 100%
Virginia 3	Joseph Neville	Anti-Administration	1793	Incumbent lost re-election.	▌ ✓ George Jackson (Democratic-Republican); ▌Joseph Neville (Democratic-Republican); ▌Thomas Wilson (Unknown); ▌John Skidmore (Unknown)
Virginia 4	Francis Preston	Anti-Administration	1793	Incumbent re-elected as a Democratic-Republican.	▌ ✓ Francis Preston (Democratic-Republican); ▌Arthur Campbell (Unknown)
Virginia 5	George Hancock	Pro-Administration	1793	Incumbent re-elected as a Federalist.	▌ ✓ George Hancock (Federalist) 100%
Virginia 6	Isaac Coles	Anti-Administration	1793	Incumbent re-elected as a Democratic-Republican.	▌ ✓ Isaac Coles (Democratic-Republican); ▌Simon Crae MacMahon (Unknown); ▌Matthew Clay (Democratic-Republican)
Virginia 7	Abraham B. Venable	Anti-Administration	1790	Incumbent re-elected as a Democratic-Republican.	▌ ✓ Abraham B. Venable (Democratic-Republican) 61.0%; ▌Thomas Woodson (Federalist) 19.8%; ▌Joseph Wyatt (Federalist) 18.9%; Others: ▌Peter Johnson (Unknown) 0.2%; ▌William Wilson (Unknown) 0.1%
Virginia 8	Thomas Claiborne	Anti-Administration	1793	Incumbent re-elected as a Democratic-Republican.	▌ ✓ Thomas Claiborne (Democratic-Republican); ▌Jesse Brown (Unknown); ▌Samuel Hopkins (Unknown); ▌Samuel Goode (Democratic-Republican); ▌Sterling Edmunds (Unknown)
Virginia 9	William B. Giles	Anti-Administration	1790	Incumbent re-elected as a Democratic-Republican.	▌ ✓ William B. Giles (Democratic-Republican) 100%
Virginia 10	Carter B. Harrison	Anti-Administration	1793	Incumbent re-elected as a Democratic-Republican.	▌ ✓ Carter B. Harrison (Democratic-Republican) 100%
Virginia 11	Josiah Parker	Pro-Administration	1789	Incumbent re-elected as a Federalist.	▌ ✓ Josiah Parker (Federalist); ▌Robert Cowper (Unknown)
Virginia 12	John Page	Anti-Administration	1789	Incumbent re-elected as a Democratic-Republican.	▌ ✓ John Page (Democratic-Republican) 100%
Virginia 13	Samuel Griffin	Pro-Administration	1789	Incumbent retired. Democratic-Republican gain. The loser unsuccessfully contested the election.	▌ ✓ John Clopton (Democratic-Republican) 38.5%; ▌Burwell Bassett (Federalist) 37.6%; ▌Miles Selden (Unknown) 22.7%; ▌Meriwether Jones (Democratic-Republican) 1.2%
Virginia 14	Francis Walker	Anti-Administration	1793	Incumbent retired.	▌ ✓ Samuel J. Cabell (Democratic-Republican) 100%
Virginia 15	James Madison	Anti-Administration	1789	Incumbent re-elected as a Democratic-Republican.	▌ ✓ James Madison (Democratic-Republican) 100%
Virginia 16	Anthony New	Anti-Administration	1793	Incumbent re-elected as a Democratic-Republican.	▌ ✓ Anthony New (Democratic-Republican) 100%
Virginia 17	Richard Bland Lee	Pro-Administration	1789	Incumbent lost re-election. Democratic-Republican gain.	▌ ✓ Richard Brent (Democratic-Republican); ▌Richard Bland Lee (Federalist)
Virginia 18	John Nicholas	Anti-Administration	1793	Incumbent re-elected as a Democratic-Republican.	▌ ✓ John Nicholas (Democratic-Republican) 100%
Virginia 19	John Heath	Anti-Administration	1793	Incumbent re-elected as a Democratic-Republican.	▌ ✓ John Heath (Democratic-Republican) 100%

== Non-voting delegates ==
=== 3rd Congress ===
District	Incumbent			This race	
District	Delegate	Party	First elected	Results	Candidates
Southwest Territory at-large	None (new seat)			New delegate elected by the territorial legislature and seated September 3, 1794 as Congress's first non-voting delegate. Successor also elected to the next term; see below.	▌ ✓ James White (Independent) 11 votes; ▌William Cocke (Democratic-Republican) 7 votes

=== 4th Congress ===
District	Incumbent			This race	
District	Delegate	Party	First elected	Results	Candidates
Southwest Territory at-large	James White	Non-partisan	1794 (new seat)	Incumbent delegate re-elected by the territorial legislature.	▌ ✓ James White (Independent); Unopposed

== See also ==
- 1794 United States elections
  - List of United States House of Representatives elections (1789–1822)
  - 1794–95 United States Senate elections
- 3rd United States Congress
- 4th United States Congress

== Bibliography ==
- "A New Nation Votes: American Election Returns 1787-1825". Tufts Digital Library, Tufts University. Archived from the original on January 29, 2015.
- Dubin, Michael J. (March 1, 1998). United States Congressional Elections, 1788-1997: The Official Results of the Elections of the 1st Through 105th Congresses. McFarland and Company. ISBN 978-0786402830.
- Martis, Kenneth C. (January 1, 1989). The Historical Atlas of Political Parties in the United States Congress, 1789-1989. Macmillan Publishing Company. ISBN 978-0029201701.
- "Party Divisions of the House of Representatives* 1789–Present". Office of the Historian, United States House of Representatives.
- Mapping Early American Elections project team (2019). "Mapping Early American Elections". Roy Rosenzweig Center for History and New Media, George Mason University.
