= Rhode Island State Navy =

Navy established during American Revolutionary War

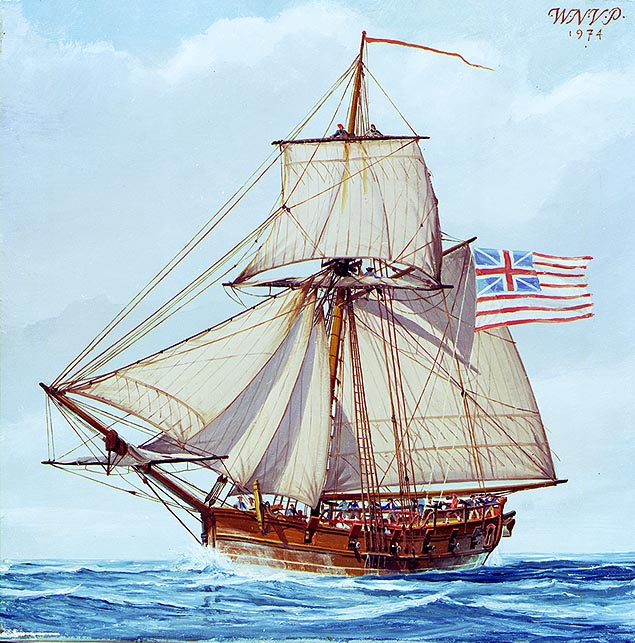
- Katy, a sloop of the Rhode Island State Navy
- Active: 1775–1781
- Country: United Colonies; United States
- Allegiance: Rhode Island
- Branch: Navy

Commanders
- Notable commanders: Abraham Whipple; Silas Talbot

The Rhode Island State Navy was the state navy of Rhode Island during the American Revolutionary War. It was founded on June 15, 1775 by the Rhode Island General Assembly, which authorized the acquisition of two ships for the purpose of defending Rhode Island's merchant shipping and coastal communities from British attacks. The state navy was generally utilized for defensive operations within Narragansett Bay, although it captured several British ships. In addition to the state navy, the General Assembly also issued letters of marque to privateers. The state navy was disbanded in 1781 after its last ship was sold.

== Early establishment and legislative history ==
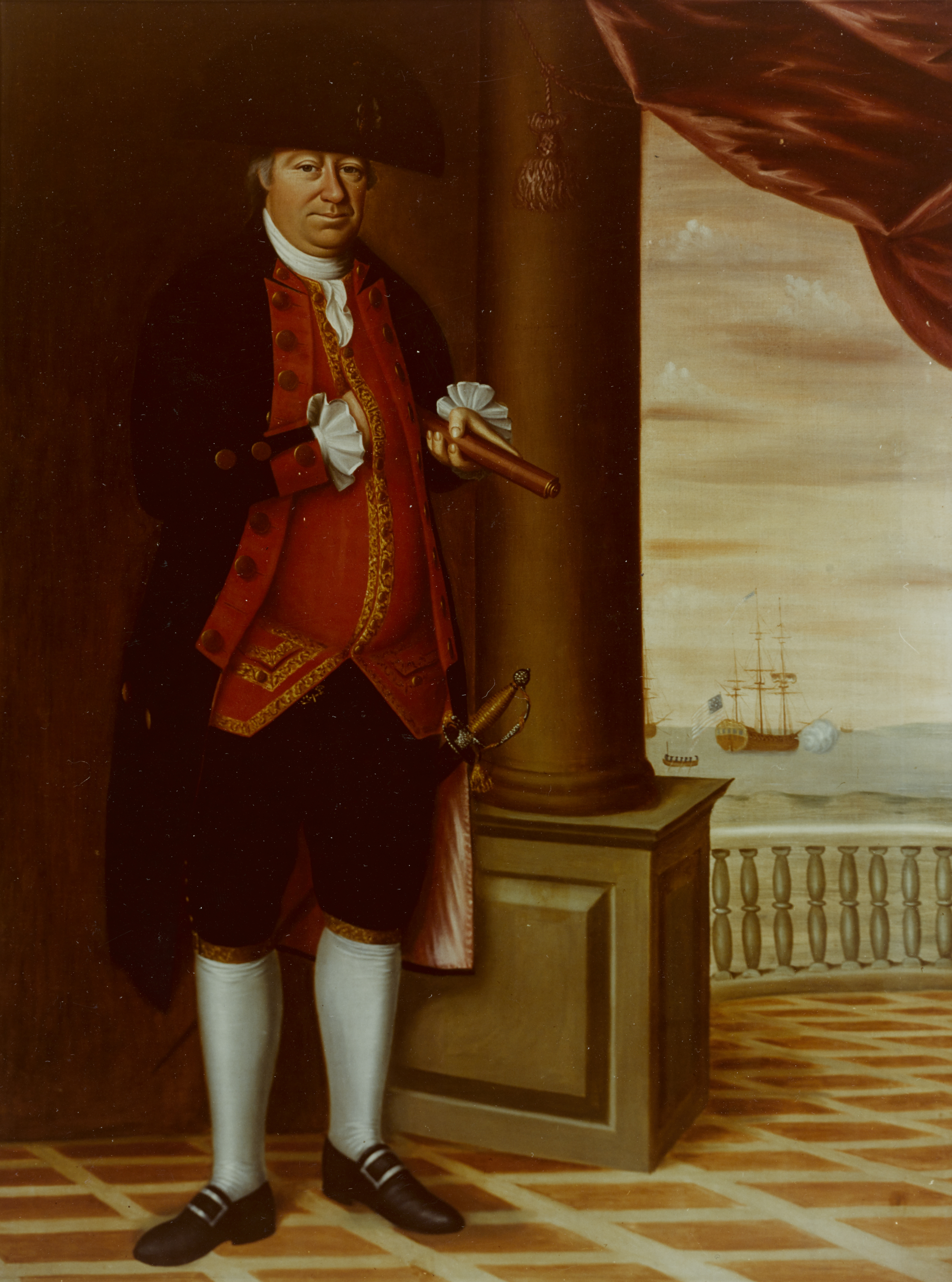
1786 portrait of Whipple by Edward Savage

Following the outbreak of the American Revolutionary War, the Royal Navy sent HMS Rose, a frigate commanded James Wallace as captain to put a halt to smuggling out of Newport. On June 13, 1775, Nicholas Cooke, the colony's lieutenant governor, officially asked Wallace to return two ships he had captured. Two days later, the General Assembly authorized the Committee of Safety to acquire two ships for the purpose of defending the colony's trade, established a committee to oversee the acquisition and fitting of the ships, and appointed Abraham Whipple as commodore of the state navy. Two sloops, Katy and Washington, were purchased. Whipple reported that the same day, June 15, he captured a tender of Rose.

The navy was organized under, and subject to the direction of, the state's militia generals. In January 1776 two more ships were authorized, and an admiralty court was established to adjudicate maritime matters, including the distribution of prizes. The legislation also authorized the governor to issue letters of marque, making privateering possible. The latter legislation was amended the following May to harmonize it with Continental Navy regulations. About 200 ships engaged in privateering on behalf of the state. The General Assembly authorized two more armed ships in 1777, but neither was apparently acquired.

It also authorized the purchase of merchant ships for the state's use, which resulted in the acquisition two sloops, Aurora and Diamond. Further authorizations occurred in 1778 in support of an anticipated expedition to expel the British from Newport (which failed in the August Battle of Rhode Island), but were only fulfilled later, with the acquisition of the galley Pigot and the sloop Argo, which were commanded by Continental Army Lieutenant Colonel Silas Talbot. The last ship commissioned by the state of Rhode Island was Rover, a sloop that saw only brief service in 1781.

== Service ==
Katy and Washington primarily cruised in Narragansett Bay in 1775. In August, General George Washington, seeking any possible supplies of gunpowder, suggested that the Rhode Island ships be used for an expedition to Nassau where there was believed to be a supply of gunpowder. Katy was sent on this errand in September, returning without success, as the powder had been removed. She was then used in November to transport Esek Hopkins and other recruits to Philadelphia for service in the recently created Continental Navy. On her arrival there, she was commissioned into the Continental Navy as USS Providence.

Washington's fate is uncertain; she sometimes left the bay to warn arriving ships of British threats, but was not particularly seaworthy, and was probably returned to her original owner. In January 1776 two row galleys, named Spitfire and Washington, were added to the fleet. Both saw service in the defense of New York City in the fall of 1776, but returned to Rhode Island waters. Spitfire was captured by British forces on May 25, 1778 during the Mount Hope Bay raids. Washington was reported to blow up near Bristol in April 1777. Colonel Talbot, as commander of Pigot and Argo, captured a number of prizes, and was ultimately rewarded with a Continental Navy commission; the two ships ended their service in 1780.

== See also ==
- Rhode Island Naval Militia
