= HM galley Pigot =

2 Royal British Navy gallies of the same name

Two vessels of the Royal Navy have borne the name, HM galley Pigot. Both were acquired in 1778 during the American Revolutionary War, and both were lost that year; her crew destroyed the first to avoid her capture, and the Americans captured the second. Both were named for General Sir Robert Pigot, the general commanding the British Army at Newport, Rhode Island, during their service there.

== First galley Pigot ==
On 16 May 1778, Pigot, (or Pigott) took her station in the Seconnet. Pigot was the former tender, Lady Parker, a schooner, that had been fitted out as a galley. The British at Newport now had three galleys, Alarm, Pigot, and Spitfire. They also had a new galley equipping. Earlier, Lieutenant (and future admiral and baron) James Saumarez had commanded Lady Parker for some months until 17 February 1778, when he had been given command of Spitfire. (Note: Lady Parker was a prize that served as a tender to Unicorn. Whatever her original name, she was renamed for the wife of Admiral Sir Peter Parker, who had commanded the naval force that had captured Newport, Rhode Island. She was already serving on 4 October 1777 when she sent in a small schooner from Philadelphia that was carrying flour.)

Lieutenant Sir Henry Edwyn Stanhope of Nonsuch, was appointed to command the Pigot galley. On 25 May, the British launched the two-pronged Warren and Bristol raid. Pigot supported one division, which went up Warren Creek, where they succeeded in surprising and capturing an armed galley.

Five days later, 100 men of the 54th Regiment of Foot embarked on boats to attack saw mills at Fall River, Massachusetts. Pigot and some armed boats were to provide support. Pigot grounded, but the attack proceeded anyway. A sharp skirmish ensued when the troops arrived at their objective. Even so, they were able to destroy one saw mill and one grain mill, as well as a large stock of planks and boards, other buildings, some cedar boats, and so on. They then withdrew, having lost two men killed and five officers and men wounded. As the tide returned, Pigot was floated off, but as Flora towed her off, Flora lost two men killed and a lieutenant severely wounded.

Between 29 May and 18 July, the British captured a number of vessels: the sloops Sally and Fancy, snow Baron D'Ozell, Olive Branch, sloop Betsey, and schooner Sally. Pigot shared the prize money with HMS Lark, Kingfisher, Hope, and Sphinx.

French Admiral d'Estaing's squadron arrived in Narragansett Bay on 29 July 1778 to support the American army under General George Washington during the battle of Rhode Island. On 30 July, four French ships of the line entered Narragansett Bay and positioned themselves north of Conanicut Island to support the American and French forces in the battle of Rhode Island. The arrival of the French vessels trapped several British vessels, Pigot among them. On 5 August 1778, Pigot lay anchored off Arnold's Point; Stanhope ran her ashore and set fire to her. The Royal Navy ended up having to scuttle ten of their own vessels in all.

== Second galley Pigot ==
Admiral Lord Howe bought on 19 July 1778 a brig that would become the second Pigot. This was well after the first Pigot was already deployed under her own name, but not long before Stanhope scuttled that Pigot. Apparently the Royal Navy registered her by Admiralty Order dated 22 December 1778, that is, some two months after the Americans had captured her.

By end-August 1778, the American threat to Newport had ended. At some point, the British removed the upper deck of the brig they had bought and converted her to a galley of 200 tons (bm). They gave her eight 12-pounder guns that they had rescued from Flora, and ten swivel guns; (Note: Flora was the largest of the ten vessels the British had had to scuttle in August.) she received the name Pigot, after Sir Robert. Lieutenant William Dunlop commissioned her, commanding a crew of 40-45 men.

=== Capture ===
Pigot took up her station in the Seconnet River. This proved to be a problem for the Americans and the American commander in Rhode Island, General John Sullivan decided to attempt to remove her. He appointed Major Silas Talbot to command of the schooner Hawk (or Hawke). Hawk belonged to the Providence River squadron that the Continental Army organized after the failure of the attack on Rhode Island. She was a small vessel, 70 tons (bm), armed with only two guns, both 3-pounders, and Talbot gathered 60 volunteers to man her.

Hawk left Providence on 25 October but had to wait several times for better winds, or night. On the way she picked up 15 more men. On the night of 27 October Talbot launched his attack. He had rigged a kedge anchor to Hawk's bowsprit so as he came up along Pigot he was able to tear open the anti-boarding nets she had rigged.

At 2:30am on 28 October, Dunlop was awakened with the news that a strange vessel was approaching. He rushed on deck to discover that only the quartermaster and three men were on deck and that, in disregard of his orders, Pigot's guns were not primed. He and the men on deck fired small arms, but a volley of small arms fire from the men on Hawk drove all but Dunlop below decks. Dunlop attempted to resist but was soon overpowered. There were no casualties on either side.

Talbot sailed Pigot out to sea; he arrived at Stonington, Connecticut the next day. From there the Americans sent the prisoners to Providence, Rhode Island. They arrived there on 2 November and were incarcerated on board a prison ship.

On 14 November the Continental Congress passed a resolution recognizing Talbot's feat in capturing Pigot, and promoted him to lieutenant colonel. The Rhode Island General Assembly awarded Talbot with an honour sword in recognition of his exploit.

=== American service ===
Pigot was condemned as a prize of war on 25 November.

Sullivan received the consent of the Rhode Island authorities to acquire some vessels. He bought Pigot in November, and the sloop Argo the next spring. The Rhode Island State Navy took Pigot into service with Talbot as her captain. She served until 1779 and was sold in 1780. (Note: One account has the Rhode Island State Navy renaming Pigot to Argo, but this is an error. Elsewhere, the same source lists Argo as a sloop of 12 guns. As Paulin makes clear, these are two quite distinct vessels, and both served the Continental Congress, not the state. DANFS too confuses Pigot with Argo.) A Captain Clarke had replaced Talbot, who went on to command Argo. Governor Greene of Rhode Island, but then at Philadelphia, instructed William Ellery to have Clarke sail Pigot to Providence and that she be sold there as she was too rotten and too dull a sailer to warrant retaining in service, and it would be too expensive to refit her. Legend has it that she was subsequently burned.

=== Post-script ===
The court-martial of Dunlop, his officers, and men resulted in the master, John Lanadale, being dismissed the service and imprisoned in the Marshalsea for one year for being in his hammock when he was supposed to have been on watch on deck. Also, Midshipman William Allen was severely reprimanded for having left the deck without having been properly relieved.
