= 1794 South Carolina's 5th congressional district special election =

A special election was held in South Carolina's 5th congressional district on October 13–14, 1794 to fill a vacancy left by the death of Alexander Gillon (A) on October 6, 1794.

== Election results ==
Candidate	Party	Votes	Percent
Robert Goodloe Harper	Pro-Administration	227	91.9%
William Elliott	Unknown	18	7.3%
James Simmon	Unknown	2	0.8%

Harper took his seat on February 9, 1795.

== See also ==
- List of special elections to the United States House of Representatives
- United States House of Representatives elections, 1794 and 1795
