= 1793 United States House of Representatives elections in New York =

United States House of Representatives elections in New York, 1793
- January 2, 1793

All 10 New York seats to the United States House of Representatives
	Majority party	Minority party
Party	Pro-Administration	Anti-Administration
Last election	5	1
Seats won	7	3
Seat change	▲2	▲2
Popular vote	12,973	11,906
Percentage	52.1%	47.9%

The 1793 United States House of Representatives elections in New York were held in January 1793, to elect 10 U.S. Representatives to represent the State of New York in the United States House of Representatives.

== Background ==
Six U.S. Representatives had been elected in April 1790 to a term in the 2nd United States Congress beginning on March 4, 1791. One representative-elect had died in May 1790, and a representative had been elected in April 1791 to fill the vacancy. Their term would end on March 3, 1793.

State elections in New York were at that time held during the last week of April, which meant that the State election preceding the beginning of the next congressional term was held more than ten months in advance, although the regular session of Congress was scheduled to convene only on the first Monday in December. Nevertheless, the New York Legislature had chosen in 1790 to have the congressional elections held that early, in case there might be a special session to convene at an earlier date. However, in 1792, Congress re-apportioned the seats, and New York's representation was increased from six to ten. This required a re-apportionment of congressional districts in the State which was enacted only in December 1792, and the elections were held only in January 1793.

== Congressional districts ==
On January 27, 1789, the New York State Legislature had divided the State of New York into six congressional districts which were not numbered. On December 18, 1792, the Legislature divided the State into ten districts, which were still not numbered, taking into account the new counties created in 1791.

- One district (later back-numbered as the 1st) comprising Kings, Queens and Suffolk counties.
- One district (later back-numbered as the 2nd) comprising New York County.
- One district (later back-numbered as the 3rd) comprising Westchester and Richmond counties.
- One district (later back-numbered as the 4th) comprising Orange and Ulster counties.
- One district (later back-numbered as the 5th) comprising Dutchess County.
- One district (later back-numbered as the 6th) comprising Columbia County.
- One district (later back-numbered as the 7th) comprising Clinton and Rensselaer counties.
- One district (later back-numbered as the 8th) comprising Albany County.
- One district (later back-numbered as the 9th) comprising Washington and Saratoga counties.
- One district (later back-numbered as the 10th) comprising Montgomery, Ontario, Herkimer, Otsego and Tioga counties.

Note: There are now 62 counties in the State of New York. The counties which are not mentioned in this list had not yet been established, or sufficiently organized, the area being included in one or more of the abovementioned counties.

== Result ==
7 Federalists and 3 Anti-Federalist (later known as the Democratic-Republicans) were elected. The incumbents Tredwell and Gordon were re-elected; the incumbent Schoonmaker was defeated; and the incumbents John Laurance, Egbert Benson and Peter Silvester did not run for re-election.

1793 United States House election result
District	Federalist		Democratic-Republican		Federalist		Democratic-Republican		Democratic-Republican		Democratic-Republican		Democratic-Republican	
1	Joshua Sands	769	Thomas Tredwell	1,446	Harry Peters	673								
2	John Watts	1,872	William S. Livingston	707										
3	Richard Hatfield	804	Philip Van Cortlandt	1,003										
4	Peter Van Gaasbeck	1,464	John Hathorn	1,448			John Carpenter	72	Cornelius C. Schoonmaker	53	William Thompson	40	Jesse Woodhull	19
5	James Kent	852	Theodorus Bailey	984										
6	Ezekiel Gilbert	977	Peter R. Livingston	948			Peter Van Ness	856						
7	John E. Van Alen	1,165	Henry K. Van Rensselaer	870			Thomas Sickles	12						
8	Henry Glen	927	Jeremiah Van Rensselaer	526										
9	James Gordon	1,278	John Williams	1,146			John M. Thompson	355						
10	Silas Talbot	1,231	John Winn	928	William Cooper	961	Andrew Fink	408	Josiah Crane	85				

Note: At this time political parties were still very new in the United States. Politicians aligned in two opposing groups: Those supporting the federal government and those opposing it. The first group are generally known as the Federalists, or (as a group in Congress) the "Pro-Administration Party." The second group at first were called the Anti-Federalists, or (as a group in Congress) the "Anti-Administration Party", but soon called themselves "Republicans." However, at the same time, the Federalists called them "Democrats" which was meant to be pejorative. After some time both terms got more and more confused, and sometimes used together as "Democratic Republicans" which later historians have adopted (with a hyphen) to describe the party from the beginning, to avoid confusion with both the later established and still existing Democratic and Republican parties.

== Aftermath ==
The House of Representatives of the 3rd United States Congress met for the first time at Congress Hall in Philadelphia on December 2, 1793, and nine of the ten representatives took their seats on this day. Only Thomas Tredwell arrived later, and took his seat on December 13.

On December 6, Henry K. Van Rensselaer contested the election of John E. Van Alen, alleging several irregularities to have happened in the towns of Stephentown and Hoosick, and in the area of the Manor of Rensselaerswyck. Van Rensselaer's petition was rejected on December 24 by the House, confirming Van Alen's election.

On June 5, 1794, President Washington chose Silas Talbot one of the first six captains of the newly established United States Navy. Talbot vacated his seat upon his appointment to the Navy, but Democratic-Republican Governor George Clinton declined to call a special election, in which another Federalist would have been elected, and the seat remained vacant until the end of the term on March 3, 1795.

== Sources ==
- The New York Civil List compiled in 1858 (see: pg. 65 for district apportionment; pg. 68 for Congressmen)
- Members of the Third United States Congress
- Election result 1st D. at Tufts University Library project "A New Nation Votes"
- Election result 2nd D. at Tufts University Library project "A New Nation Votes"
- Election result 3rd D. at Tufts University Library project "A New Nation Votes"
- Election result 4th D. at Tufts University Library project "A New Nation Votes"
- Election result 5th D. at Tufts University Library project "A New Nation Votes"
- Election result 6th D. at Tufts University Library project "A New Nation Votes"
- Election result 7th D. at Tufts University Library project "A New Nation Votes"
- Election result 8th D. at Tufts University Library project "A New Nation Votes"
- Election result 9th D. at Tufts University Library project "A New Nation Votes"
- Election result 10th D. at Tufts University Library project "A New Nation Votes"
