= USS Washington (1776 row galley) =

History

United States
- Name: USS Washington
- Namesake: George Washington
- Ordered: in 1775 by the Rhode Island General Assembly
- In service: January 1776
- Out of service: August 1776
- Fate: destroyed by explosion, 1777

General characteristics
- Type: Row galley
- Propulsion: Oars
- Complement: 60
- Armament: One 18-pounder gun

Washington was a 1-gun row galley of the Rhode Island State Navy. With a rowing crew of 60, she was placed into service under the control of the Continental Congress in 1776. During this age of sail, row galleys were highly maneuverable compared to sailing ships whose movements were dependent on the wind. Washington's war record consisted of an attack on several British warships, and, after finding itself on the losing side of the battle, the row galley rowed away, out of danger. She was lost by an explosion is Rhode Island in 1777.

== Authorized by Rhode Island ==
In the autumn of 1775, the Rhode Island General Assembly ordered the construction of two row galleys, Washington and Spitfire, and in January 1776 appointed John Grimes commodore of galleys. During the winter and spring of 1776, these galleys operated in Narragansett Bay, protecting the colony's shipping, carrying troops, and covering foraging parties seeking supplies.

The General Assembly voted and resolved that;

two row-gallies be forthwith built and equipped at the expense of the colony, for its protection and defense; that they be of suitable bigness to carry sixty men, each; to row with fifteen oars on a side, and to mount one eighteen, pounder in the bow, and a number of swivel guns; and that they be built in such further and particular form, model and construction as shall be judged most fitting, by the committee hereafter named, for answering the design and purpose of their building. And that Ambrose Page, Esq. be the person for the above purpose, and that he be empowered to draw out of the general treasury, a sum not exceeding £-300, to enable him to prosecute the building. In October following, Ambrose Page, Esq., was requested to procure the two row-gallies belonging to the colony, to be immediately completed fit for service; and that he draw out of the general treasury the sum of £100, lawful money, for the purpose aforesaid.

== Seeking battle with the British ==
In July, the galleys were sent to New York City to join the tiny flotilla George Washington was fitting out on the Hudson River and apparently came under Continental control.

On the afternoon of 3 August, Washington served as flagship for Lieutenant Colonel Benjamin Tupper as that officer led an attack on the Royal Navy's warships Phoenix and Rose. As the galleys approached, Phoenix opened fire on the American boats to begin an action at grapeshot range which lasted some two hours before the Americans retired to Dobb's Ferry. During the engagement, four Americans were killed, and 14 others were wounded. On the British side, Phoenix was hulled twice and suffered substantial damage.

== Fate ==
Washington was tasked to protect Rhode Island’s Kickemuit River at its entry point, the Bristol Narrows. In 1777, an explosion on the galley killed eight crew members. Their bodies were buried on the western bank of the river near the selfsame narrows.

== See also ==
- Captain Abraham Godwin, Captain of Marines
