= USS Spitfire (1776) =

History

United States
- Name: USS Spitfire
- Owner: General Assembly of Rhode Island
- Ordered: Late in 1775
- Laid down: unknown
- Completed: 1776
- In service: Circa January 1776 in Narragansett Bay
- Captured: 25 May 1778 (by British during Mount Hope Bay raids)

General characteristics
- Type: Row galley
- Propulsion: Oars
- Complement: 60 crew
- Armament: One 18-pounder gun

USS Spitfire was a 1-gun row galley of the Rhode Island State Navy. Authorized and constructed by Rhode Island during the American Revolutionary War, she was placed in service in 1776 in the Rhode Island navy. During this age of sail, row galleys were highly maneuverable compared to sailing ships whose movements were dependent on the wind. Spitfire had a mixed career, helping to capture several British merchantmen and engaging in battle against the Royal Navy. She was captured by British forces during the 1778 Mount Hope Bay raids.

== Ordered by Rhode Island ==
Late in 1775, the General Assembly of Rhode Island ordered the construction of two galleys, Washington and Spitfire. In January 1776, the General Assembly appointed John Grimes Commodore of the galleys and, presumably soon thereafter, they were placed in service in Narragansett Bay.

== Capturing British cargo ships ==
They cruised in defense of American shipping, acted as transports, and assisted landing parties seeking forage and supplies. On 11 April 1776, they recaptured the brigantine Georgia Packet and sloop Speedwell which HMS Scarborough had captured and brought into the bay, braving the fire of Scarborough's guns as they took the prizes from under her stern.

In July 1776, the galleys were ordered to New York City to help protect the Hudson River, and they reached New York harbor on 1 August. There they cooperated with a flotilla created by George Washington.

== Attacking British warships ==
On the afternoon of 3 August, Spitfire joined Lady Washington and Washington in an attack on HMS Phoenix and HMS Rose and engaged the British warships for over two hours before retiring. One man on Spitfire was killed and two were badly wounded. Her hull and rigging sustained much damage.

The two galleys returned to Providence, Rhode Island, late in the month. In mid-September, libels were filed in court on

three large cables and two large anchors, which late belonged to the British Ship-of-War, called the Scarborough; which … were captured … by … the Row-Galley called the Spitfire.

Little is known about the curious action which resulted in this litigation in Admiralty court-not even when it occurred.

== Swashbuckling ==
The quotation above does suggest that Spitfire, on at least one more occasion, continued her swashbuckling. Few records have survived to fill out the galley's subsequent career. She was apparently sent to New London, Connecticut, early in October 1776 "to strengthen the naval force as much as possible." On 6 April 1778 her boats burned a stripped sloop that was under the protection of a fort at Bristol Ferry, Rhode Island.

== Capture by British ==
By 7 May 1778, Spitfire was in Lees River near Mount Hope, under the command of Capt. Joseph Crandall of the Rhode Island Navy, with the log stating:

May 1778 Thursday 7th Remarks at, Lees River 1778 " ... at the Mount, bound for Diton, pass from Col Carary Brought Two Charles Church, in a small Ceader Boat, his pass sign by Joseph Durfee.Cap at Fall River.

On the morning of 25 May 1778, Spitfire was anchored near the entrance to the Taunton River or at Fall River. During the Mount Hope Bay raids by the British on that day, a group of British vessels under the command of Captain Samuel Reeve proceeded from Aquidneck Island to Mount Hope Bay via Bristol Ferry. Lieutenant Kempthorn then led a group of six boats from HMS Nonsuch, to seize control of Spitfire by surprise. The crew of 13 to 16 men, including the captain, did not resist and were taken as prisoners.

The captured Spitfire galley may have been used (under the same name) by the British in the subsequent Battle of Rhode Island (H. M. Galley Spitfire participated in the Raid that captured USS Spitfire).
