= 1795 South Carolina's 2nd congressional district special election =

A special election was held in South Carolina's 2nd congressional district January 19–20, 1795 to fill a vacancy left by Representative-elect John Barnwell (F) declining to serve the term for which he had been elected.

== Election results ==
Candidate	Party	Votes	Percent
Wade Hampton	Democratic-Republican	198	29.3%
William Thompson		176	26.0%
John Rutledge, Jr.	Federalist	160	23.7%
William Elliot		140	20.7%
Andrew Hartley		2	0.3%
