= 1792 United States House of Representatives election in Delaware =

- October 2, 1792
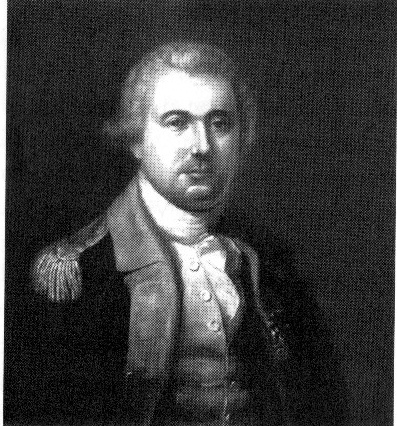

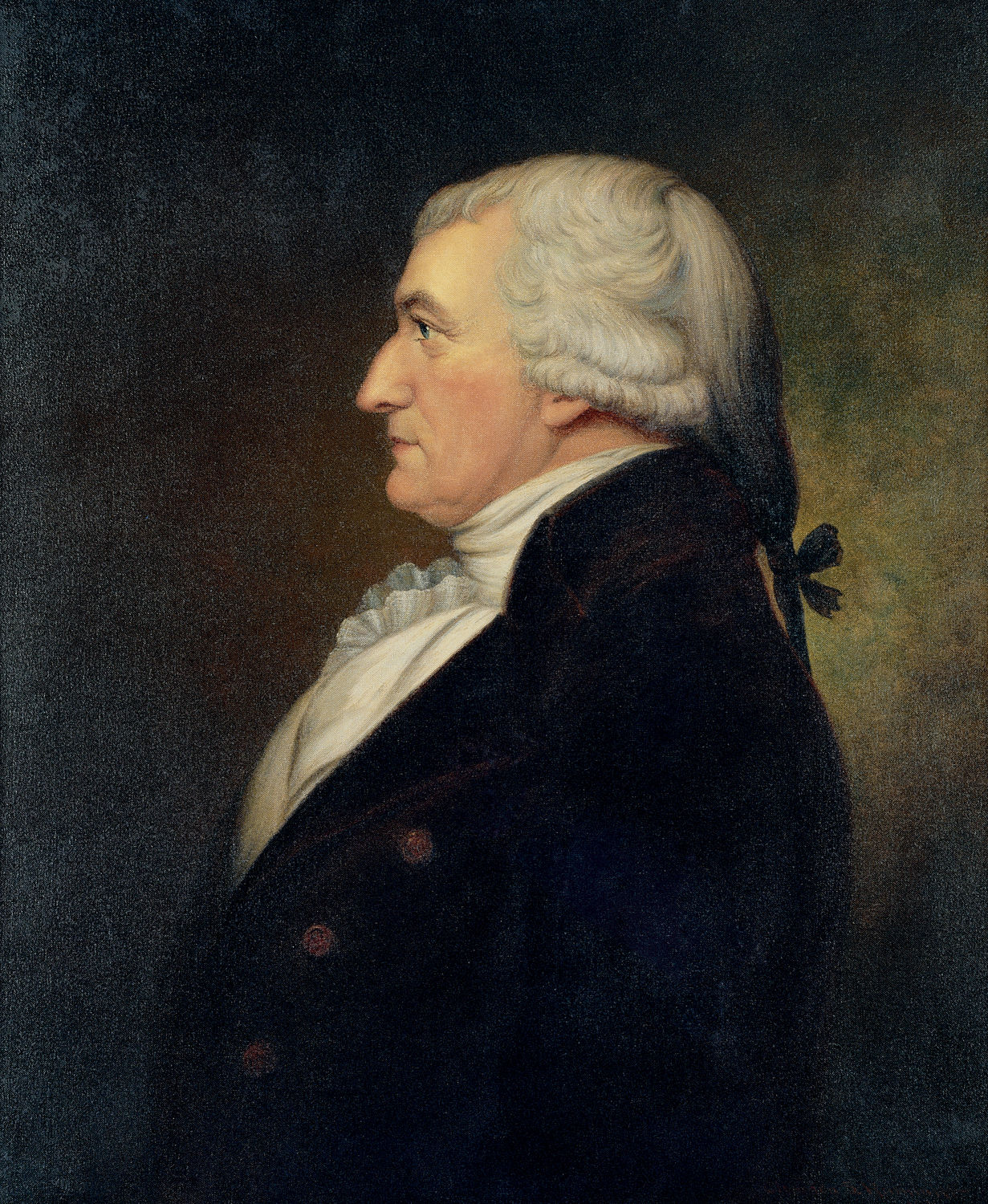

Nominee	John Patten	Henry Latimer
Party	Anti-Administration	Pro-Administration
Popular vote	2,273	2,243
Percentage	38.78%	38.27%
Nominee	Francis Many	Edward Roche
Party	Independent	Independent
Popular vote	685	465
Percentage	11.69%	7.93%
U.S. Representative before election
John Vining
Pro-Administration
Elected U.S. Representative
John Patten
Anti-Administration

The 1792 United States House of Representatives election in Delaware was held on October 2, 1792. The former Continental Congressman John Vining chose not to run for reelection and was followed by John Patten.

== Results ==
1792 United States House of Representatives election in Delaware
Party	Candidate	Votes	%
Anti-Administration	John Patten	2,273	38.78%
Pro-Administration	Henry Latimer	2,243	38.27%
Independent	Francis Many	685	11.69%
Anti-Administration	Edward Roche	465	7.93%
Pro-Administration	Andrew Barrett	195	3.33%
Total votes		5,861	100%

== Recount ==
1794 United States House of Representatives election in Delaware, recount
Party	Candidate	Votes	%
Federalist	Henry Latimer	2,238	50.37%
Democratic-Republican	John Patten	2,205	49.63%
Total votes		4,443	100%
