= Mount Hope Bay raids =

Series of military raids by British troops during the American Revolutionary War

Coordinates: 41.694°N 71.216°W

- Part of the American Revolutionary War
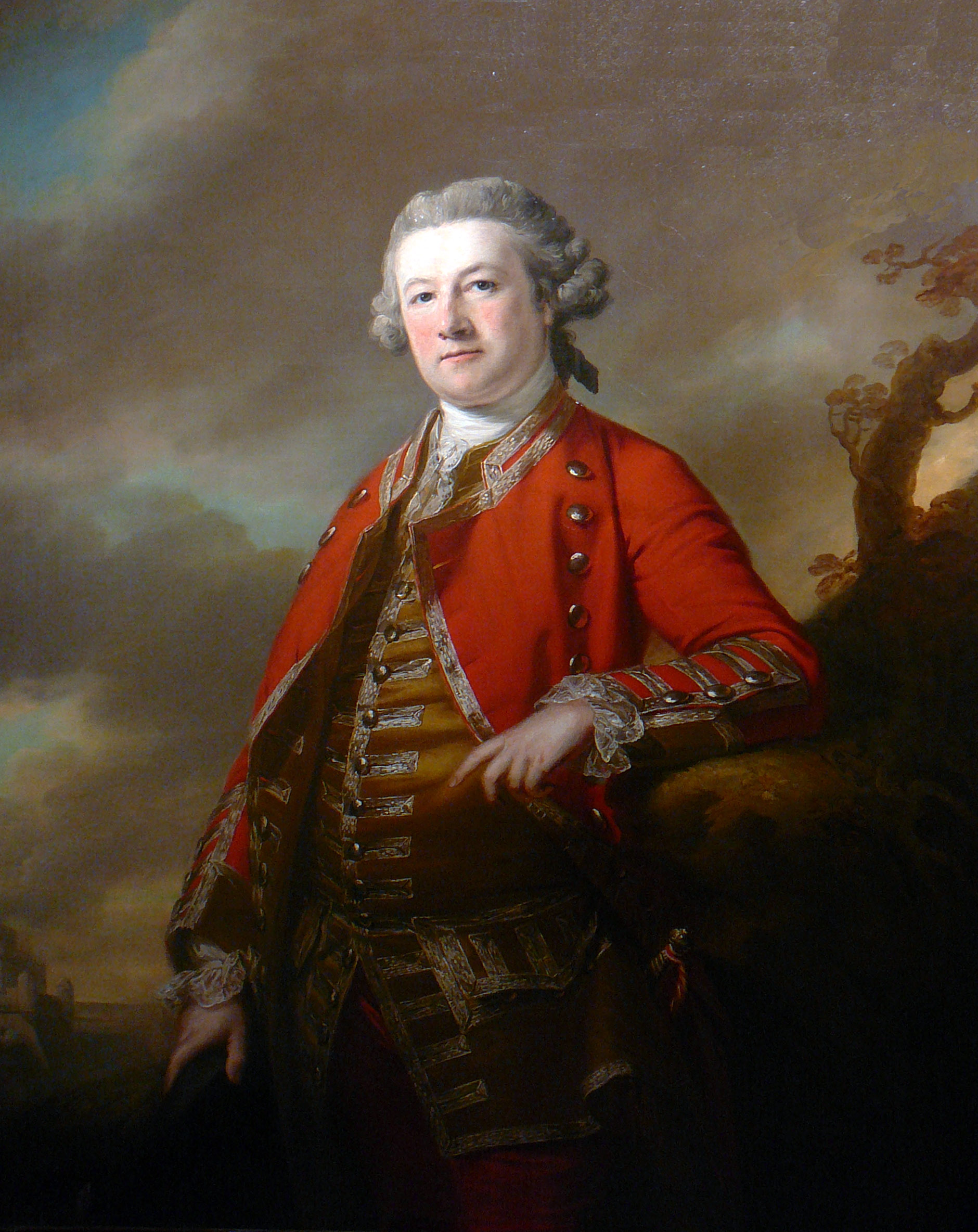
- General Sir Robert Pigot (portrait by Francis Cotes), the organizer of the raids
Date	May 25 and 31, 1778
Location	Bristol and Warren, Rhode Island; present-day Fall River, Massachusetts (then part of Freetown)
Result	British victory

Belligerents
United States	Great Britain

Commanders and leaders
William Barton (May 25); Joseph Durfee (May 31)	Sir Robert Pigot (Commander In-Chief); John Campbell (May 25); Edmund Eyre (May 31)

Strength
May 25: 500 regulars and volunteers May 31: 40 militia	May 25: 500 regulars 2 frigates May 31: 100–150 regulars

Casualties and losses
May 25: 69 civilian prisoners taken May 31: 1 captured	May 25: 11 wounded, 2 captured May 31, at Freetown: 2 killed, 5 wounded May 31, at Bristol Ferry: 2–3 killed, 1–2 wounded

The Mount Hope Bay raids were a series of military raids conducted by British troops during the American Revolutionary War against communities on the shores of Mount Hope Bay on May 25 and 31, 1778. The towns of Bristol and Warren, Rhode Island were significantly damaged, and Freetown, Massachusetts (present-day Fall River) was also attacked, although its militia resisted British attacks more successfully. The British destroyed military defenses in the area, including supplies that had been cached by the Continental Army in anticipation of an assault on British-occupied Newport, Rhode Island. Homes as well as municipal and religious buildings were also destroyed in the raids.

On May 25, 500 British and Hessian soldiers, under orders from General Sir Robert Pigot, the commander of the British garrison at Newport, Rhode Island, landed between Bristol and Warren, destroyed boats and other supplies, and plundered Bristol. Local resistance was minimal and ineffective in stopping the British activities. Six days later, 100 soldiers descended on Freetown, where less damage was done because local defenders prevented the British from crossing a bridge.

== Background ==
In December 1776, after completing the conquest of New York City, British Lieutenant General William Howe detached a body of troops from his army which occupied Newport, Rhode Island without significant opposition. The Newport garrison came under the command of Brigadier General Sir Robert Pigot when the original commander, Brigadier General Richard Prescott, was captured in the summer of 1777 in a daring commando operation led by Continental Army Major and Warren, Rhode Island, native William Barton.

Since the British occupation began American and British forces had been in a standoff. Major General Joseph Spencer had been ordered by Major General George Washington to launch an assault on Newport in 1777, but he had not done so, and was removed from command of the Rhode Island defenses. In March 1778 Congress approved the appointment of Major General John Sullivan to Rhode Island. By early May, Sullivan had arrived in the state and produced a detailed report on the situation there. He also began logistical preparations for an attack on Newport, caching equipment and supplies on the eastern shore of Narragansett Bay and the Taunton River. General Pigot was alerted to Sullivan's preparations by a local Loyalist, and organized an expedition to raid Bristol and Warren. On the evening of May 24 he ordered a force of 500 British and Hessian soldiers under the command of the 22nd Regiment's Lieutenant Colonel John Campbell to march to the northern end of Aquidneck Island, from where they took whaleboats across to the mainland.

== Warren and Bristol raid ==
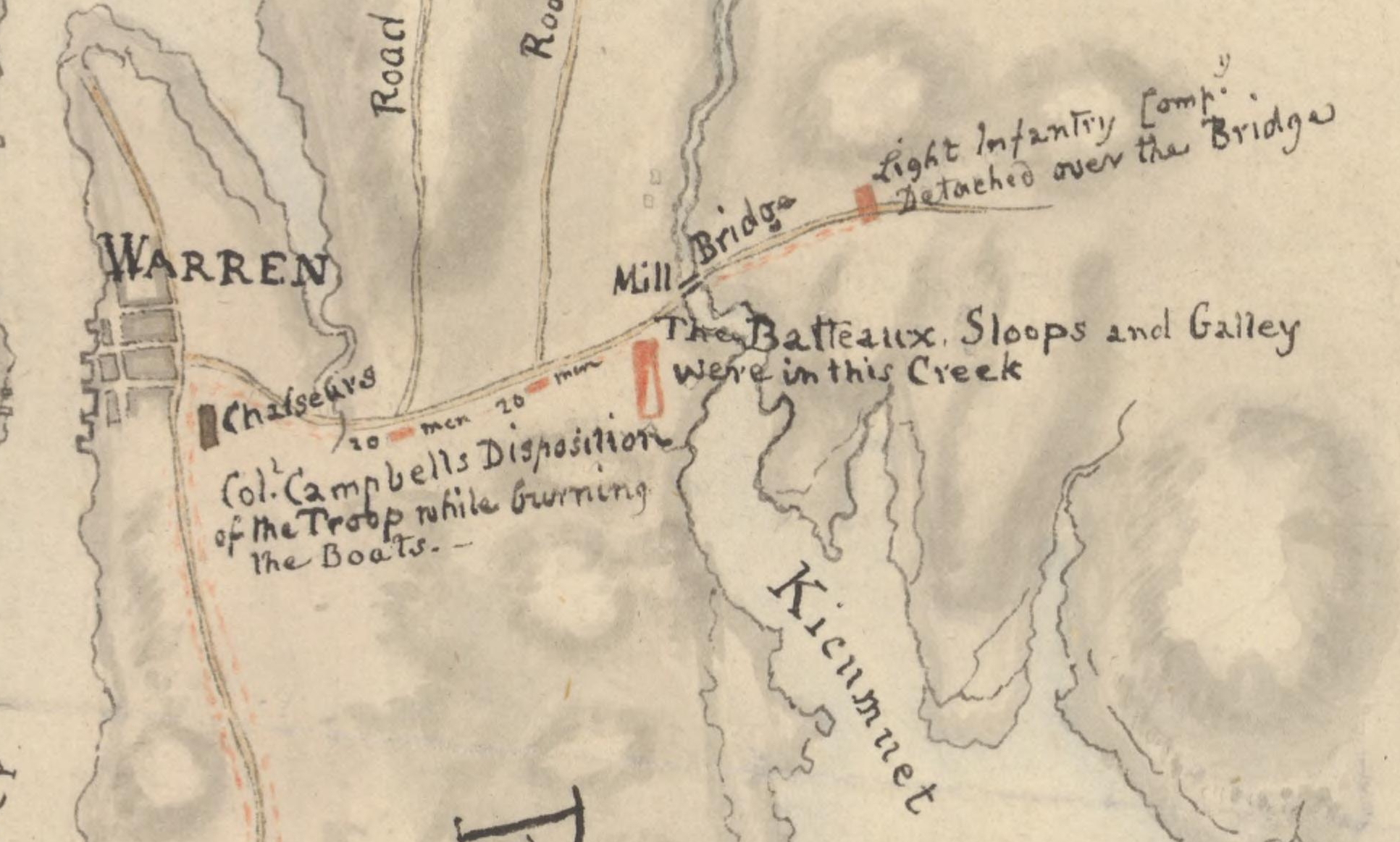
Details of the 25 May 1778 British amphibious operation to Warren, RI and the Kicumuit [sic] River are shown on the map with symbols of military units, figures of naval vessels, and notations.

Arriving early on May 25, Campbell's forces landed on Bristol Neck, between Bristol and Warren. Campbell divided his force in two, sending one detachment into Warren, and the other to areas along the Kickemuit River where boats and other supplies were cached. The latter force destroyed 58 of 70 small boats that General Spencer had originally stored there, along with other military supplies and a corn mill. They burned down a bridge that crossed the river, and set fire to a sloop. After the British left, locals put out the fire on the sloop, which only suffered minor damage.

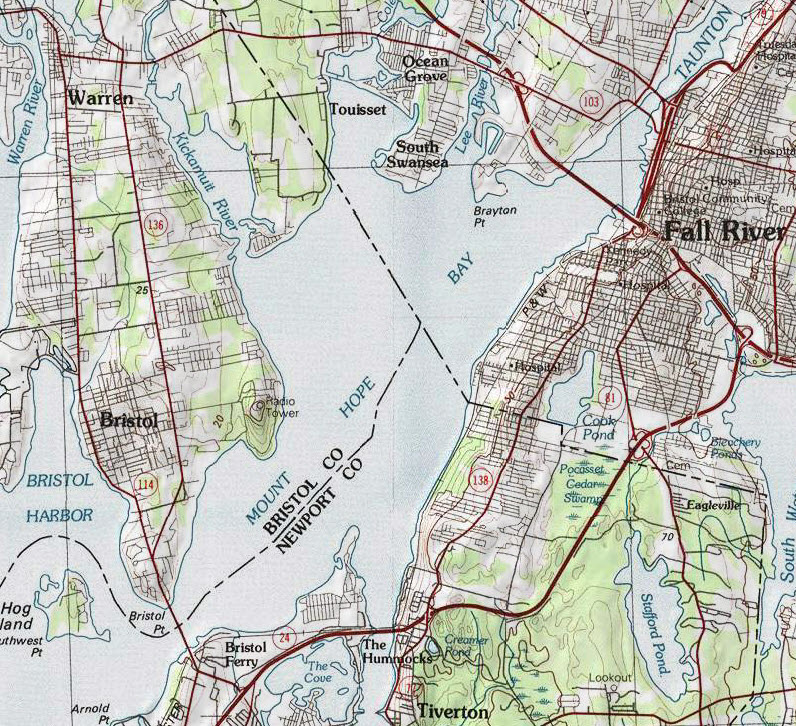
A 1984 USGS map showing Mount Hope Bay and the communities that were raided. Fall River was then part of Freetown.

The Warren detachment had expected some resistance upon reaching the town, but Continental Army forces, numbering about 300 under the command of Colonel Archibald Clary, had fled the town upon rumors that the British force was much larger than it actually was. The British destroyed military supplies, and set fire to the local powder magazine. The ensuing explosion destroyed six homes and the town's meeting house. The troops also burned a sloop and destroyed five cannon. As they marched from the town, the first signs of organized resistance began to appear. The two British detachments rejoined and headed for Bristol.

Word of the British landing had reached Providence, and Colonel Barton immediately sprang into action. Recruiting about 200 volunteers, he rushed south, turned Clary's retreating force around, and caught up with the British shortly after they left Warren, heading for Bristol. The two forces skirmished as the British marched southward, with both sides incurring minor casualties. The notable exception was Colonel Barton, who took a musket ball that did him sufficient damage that it effectively ended his military career, although he continued to fight on that day. Campbell's men reached Bristol in good order despite the ongoing skirmishes, and engaged in a destructive rampage. In addition to military supplies and cannon, they destroyed 22 homes and a church, and looted everywhere, making, according to one account, "no distinction between their Friends and Foes".

Their work completed around noon, the British returned to their boats. They embarked, covered by the guns of the frigate HMS Flora and HM galley Pigot, and returned to Aquidneck Island and Newport. The raid prompted General Sullivan to renew calls to area governors for increased militia assistance. This recruiting did not have material effect before the next raid occurred.

The May 25 raids also included the capture of an anchored American galley, the Spitfire, near the entrance to the Taunton River.

== Freetown raid ==
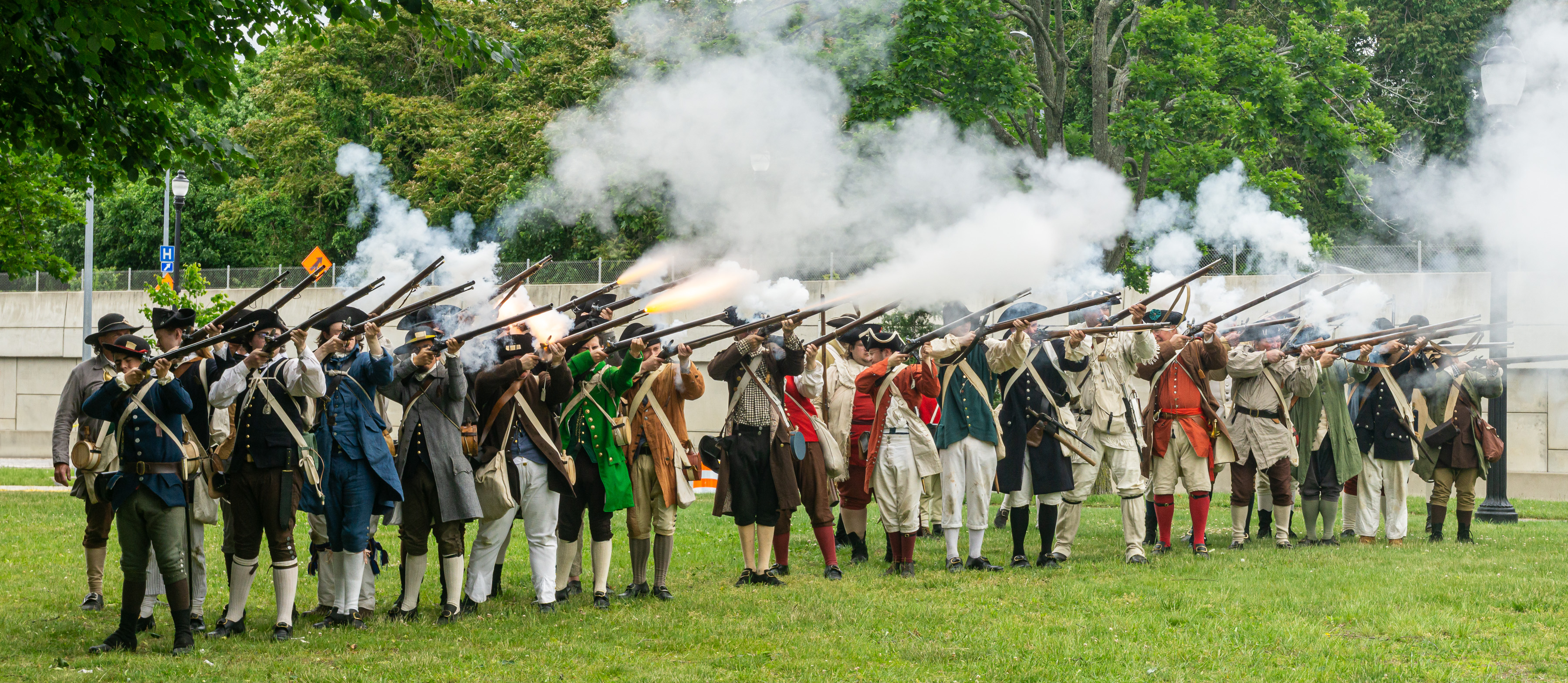
A reenactment of the "Battle of Fall River" at the Fall River Heritage State Park in 2025

Pigot next organized a smaller raiding force to go to lower Freetown (a portion that was later separated to form Fall River). On the night of May 30, a force of 100 men led by Major Edmund Eyre (who had served under Campbell in the previous raid) embarked from Arnold's Point on Aquidneck Island in flat-bottomed boats under the escort of several naval vessels, including the aforementioned HMS Flora and Pigot. The Pigot ran aground while passing through Bristol Ferry, but the rest sailed up the Taunton River, and landed near the mouth of the Quequechan River in lower Freetown on the morning of Sunday, May 31.

The local militia was under the command of Colonel Joseph Durfee (going by the title of Captain at the time), a Continental Army veteran, and had established a watch. The British landing was spotted by a sentinel and the alarm was raised. Forty men, including militia from Freetown and nearby Tiverton, mustered to give resistance. Eyre's men fired grapeshot from a small cannon and slowly pushed the militiamen uphill. As this took place, some of his men proceeded to burn a house, grist mill and sawmill, nine boats, and 15,000 feet of planking. The militia eventually reached a bridge across a stream, where about 25 men established a defensive line behind a stone wall on the far side. In a battle lasting about 90 minutes, Durfee's men repulsed repeated attempts by Eyre's men to gain control of the bridge. The British soldiers then took one local resident prisoner, set fire to his property, and retreated to their boats. The militia followed, harassing the soldiers with musket fire.

On their return to port, the British naval vessels worked to assist the Pigot, which had been grounded; in the process of doing so, they came under fire from an American battery on shore (which, by at least one account, included cannon-launched stone and spare iron) and suffered additional casualties (three killed and one wounded according to one account). The Pigot also sustained significant damage from the American battery. Some accounts describe the American prisoner (an elderly man named Richard Borden) as being aboard one of the boats coming under fire; these accounts describe the prisoner seeking shelter by laying flat on the floor of the vessel, despite attempts of his captors to have him stand (perhaps to try to dissuade the attackers); according to these accounts, one or two of the captors were eventually hit by shots from the Americans on shore. The prisoner was eventually released several days later. In addition to the casualties at Bristol Ferry, the British suffered two killed and five wounded in the battle at Freetown, while the Americans suffered no casualties beyond the one captive, who apparently emerged without any noteworthy injury.

== Aftermath ==
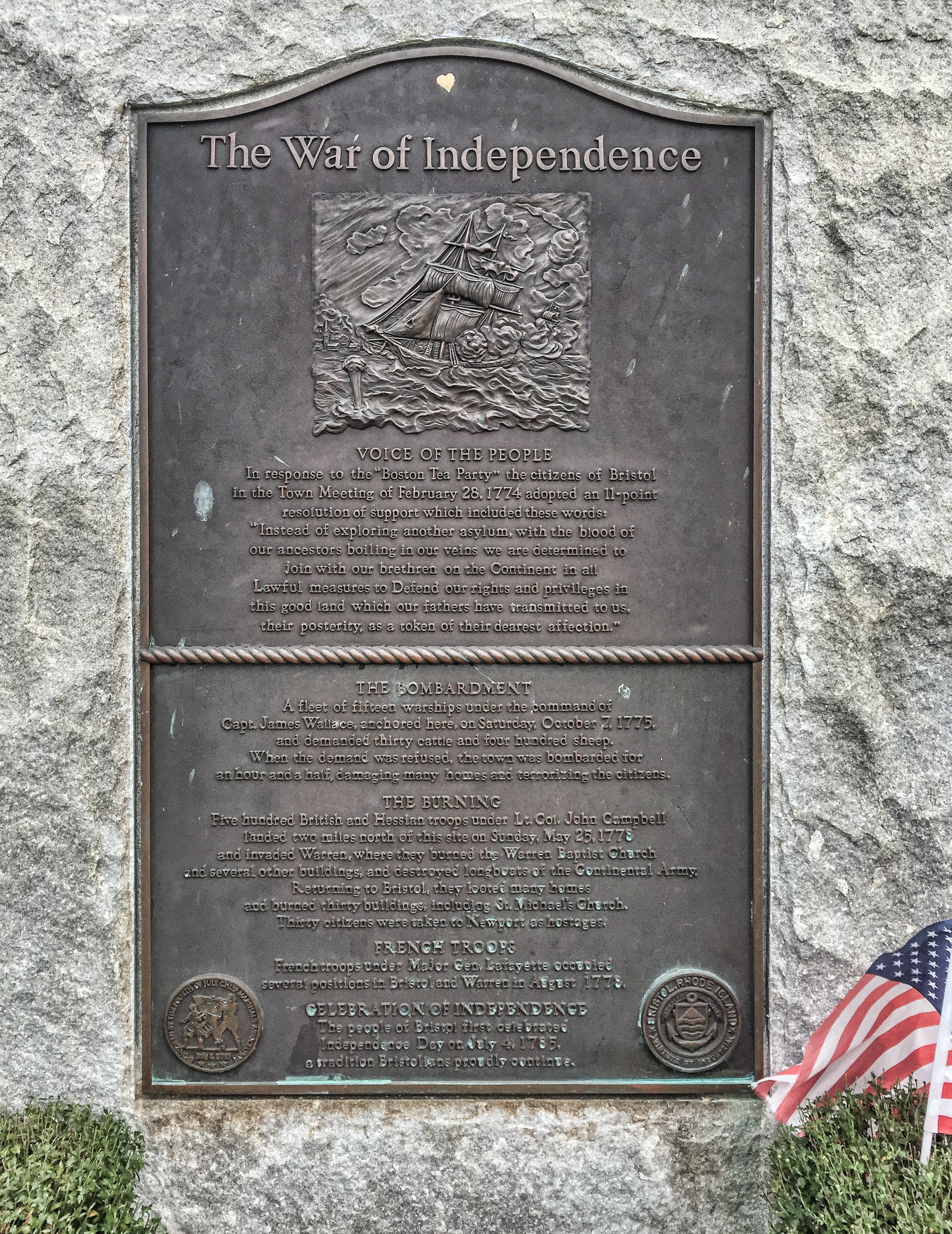
A plaque in Bristol's Independence Park commemorates the raids

The destruction of the boats and supplies was a minor setback to American plans. In mid-July, General Washington informed Sullivan that a French fleet was available to assist in operations against Newport. This had a galvanizing effect on recruiting, and local shipbuilders embarked on a crash boatbuilding program to replace the boats destroyed in the raid. By early August, the French fleet of the Comte d'Estaing had arrived off Newport, and Sullivan commanded a force of 10,000 militia and regular army troops. Bad weather and the timely arrival of a British fleet to oppose d'Estaing frustrated allied plans. Sullivan, who had occupied the northern part of Aquidneck Island, was forced to retreat by the mass desertion of militia after the French withdrew their fleet and troops. General Pigot then broke out of his lines in pursuit, but Sullivan successfully fought off his attack in the Battle of Rhode Island on August 29 before retreating off Aquidneck Island.

The British occupied Newport until October 1779, when the garrison was withdrawn for operations elsewhere. The raided communities continued to contribute to the American war effort despite the damage and difficulties caused by the raids.

Major Edmund Eyre, leader of the Freetown raid, was by 1781 promoted to lieutenant colonel, when he again led British forces during a raid on New London and Groton, Connecticut on September 6 of the same year. He was wounded early in the Battle of Groton Heights, and his troops were accused of engaging in atrocities in the aftermath of the battle.
