= 1794 Maryland's 2nd congressional district special election =

A special election was held in Maryland's 2nd congressional district on May 5, 1794, to fill a vacancy left by the resignation of John Francis Mercer (A) on April 13, 1794

== Election results ==
Candidate	Party	Votes	Percent
Gabriel Duvall	Anti-Administration	155	100%

Duvall was seated November 11, 1794

== See also ==
- List of special elections to the United States House of Representatives
