= Silas Talbot =

American American Continental Army officer (1751–1813)

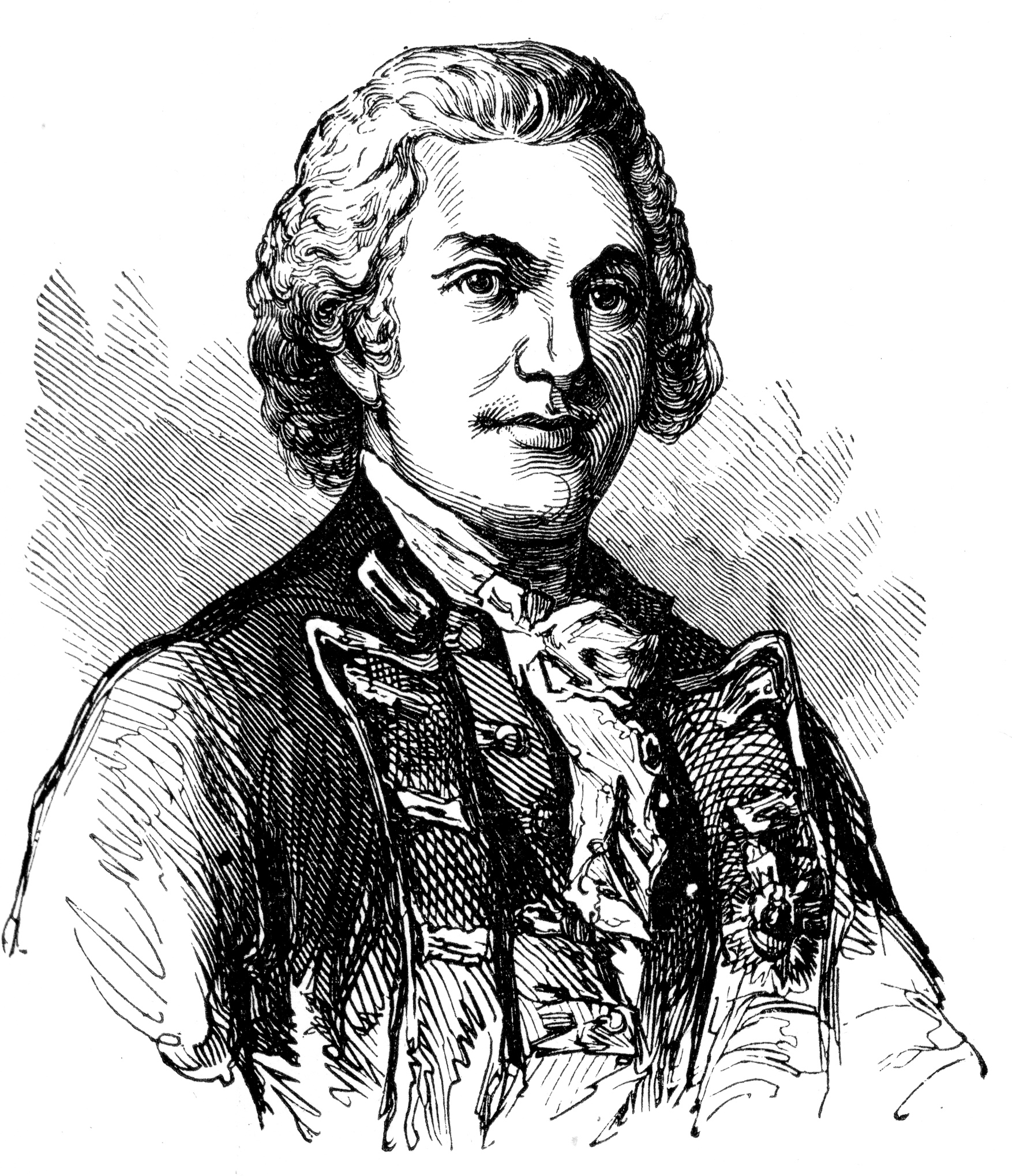

Member of the U.S. House of Representatives from New York's 10th congressional district
- In office March 4, 1793 – June 5, 1794
- Preceded by: none
- Succeeded by: William Cooper

Personal details
- Born: January 11, 1751 Dighton, Massachusetts, British America
- Died: June 30, 1813 (aged 62) New York City, New York, U.S.
- Party: Federalist Party

Military service
- Branch/service: Continental Army; Continental Navy; United States Navy
- Rank: Captain
- Battles/wars: American Revolutionary War; Siege of Boston; Battle of Rhode Island; Quasi-War; Battle of Puerto Plata Harbor

Captain Silas Talbot (January 11, 1751 – June 30, 1813) was an officer in the Continental Army and Continental Navy during the American Revolutionary War. Talbot is most famous for commanding USS Constitution from 1799 to 1801. Silas Talbot was a member of the Society of the Cincinnati's New York branch.

== Early life ==
Talbot was born on 11 January 1751 at Dighton in the Province of Massachusetts Bay, into a large farming family. At twelve, he took to seafaring, serving as a cabin boy in a coasting vessel. Talbot's performance proved outstanding, and by 1772 had saved up enough money to buy property on Weybosset Street in Providence, Rhode Island, and build a stone home, having learned the trade of stone masonry earlier in life. He was a slaveowner.

== Military service ==
=== American Revolutionary War ===
On June 28, 1775, Talbot received the commission of a captain in the 2nd Rhode Island Regiment. After participating in the siege of Boston, Talbot and the Continental Army began their march to New York. En route, they stopped at New London, Connecticut, whose port had just received Esek Hopkins, who had just landed from a naval expedition to the Bahamas. After learning that Hopkins would petition General George Washington for 200 volunteers needed to assist his squadron in reaching Providence, Talbot volunteered his services in this effort.

After Talbot made his way back to New York, where he was aiding in the transportation of troops, he obtained command of a fire ship and attempted to use it to set fire to the Royal Navy warship HMS Asia on September 14, 1776. The attempt failed, but the daring it displayed, and the fact that Talbot was severely burned during the effort, won him a promotion to major on October 10, 1777, retroactive to September 1.

After suffering a severe wound at Fort Mifflin on October 23, 1777, while fighting to defend Philadelphia, Talbot returned to active service in the summer of 1778 and fought in the Battle of Rhode Island on August 28, 1778.

As commander of the 8-gun galley Pigot (which he had captured from the Royal Navy in the Sakonnet River on October 28, 1778), and later the 12-gun sloop Argo, both under the Army, he cruised against Loyalist vessels that were harassing American trade between Long Island and Nantucket and made prisoners of many of them. On November 14, 1778, the Continental Congress passed a resolution that recognized his success in capturing Pigot and promoted him to lieutenant colonel on the same date. In October of the same year, the Rhode Island General Assembly voted to present Talbot with a "genteel silver-hilted sword" for the same action. Silversmith John Gladding Gibbs of Providence made the sword.

==== Continental Navy ====
Because of his success fighting afloat for the Army, Congress commissioned Talbot as a captain in the Continental Navy on September 17, 1779. However, since Congress had no suitable warship to entrust to him, Talbot put to sea in command of the privateer General Washington. He took one prize in it, but he soon ran into a Royal Navy fleet off New York. After a chase, he struck his colors to Culloden, a 74-gun British ship-of-the-line and remained a prisoner of war until exchanged for a British officer in December 1781.

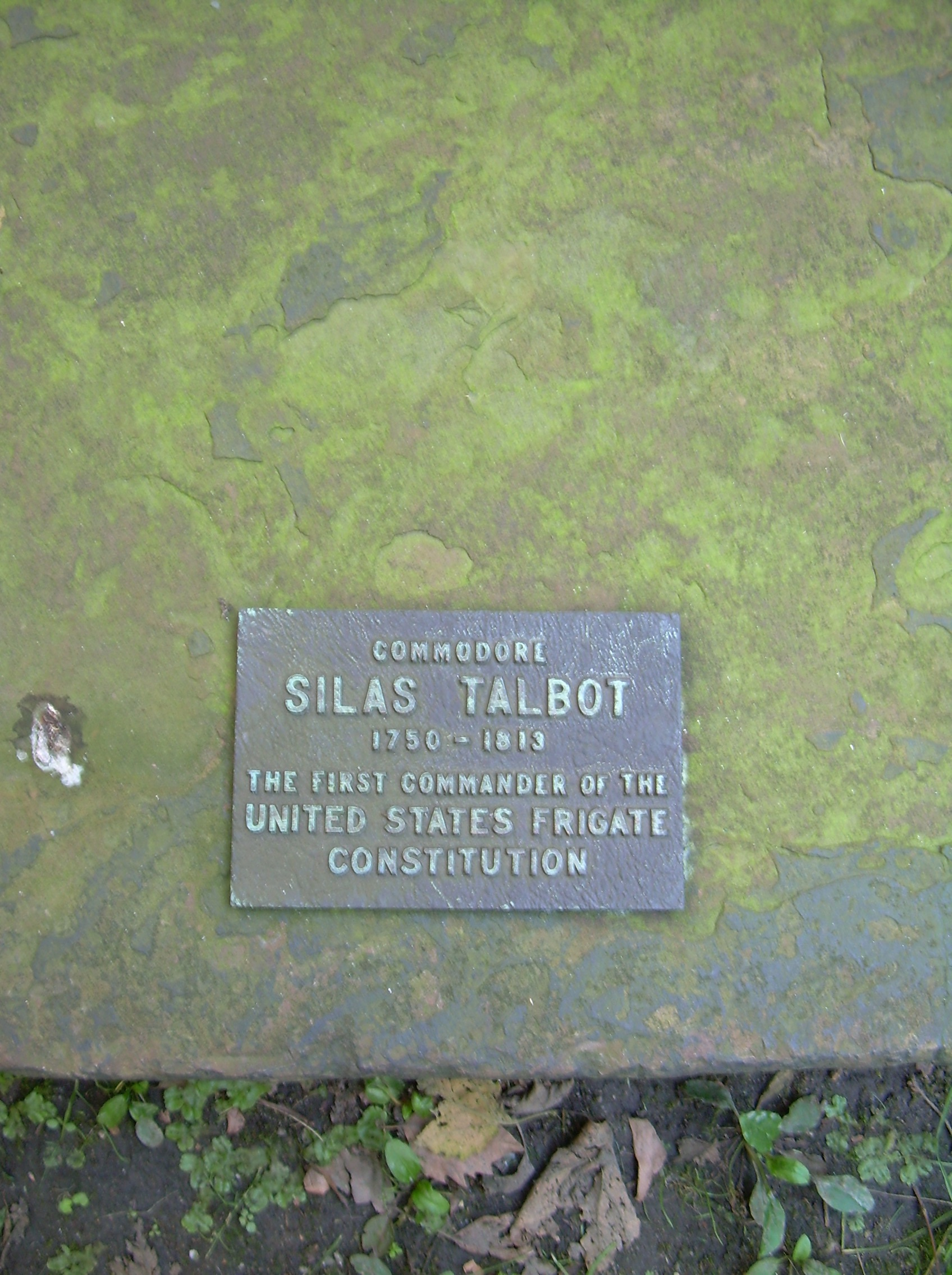
Talbot is buried at Trinity Churchyard. This photo represents the original, incorrect grave marker placed by the NY SAR. As of July 2019, a new, correct marker has been installed, following years of effort by Silas Talbot's 4th great-grandson, Peter J. Talbot. The original marker is now in his possession, gifted to him by Trinity Church.

==== Slave trader ====
Talbot was twice involved in mercantile enterprises, both for a slave ship cargo including slaves. In late 1783 he had an interest in a cargo of produce and slaves shipped to Charleston, South Carolina, in the sloop PEGGY. In August 1785 he bought half of the 90-ton brigantine Industry. Both vessels transported slaves from the Guinea region to Charleston. On one 1786 voyage of the Industry, Talbot was notified by his solicitors, Murray, Mumford, and Bower, on 9 September 1786 of a significant financial loss: "We hear about one hundred & eighty Slaves off the coast of Guinea, near half of which died before the brig arrived in Charleston where she is now." Talbot later sold his half of the Industry, but, as late as 1801, he was still trying to collect his half of the cargo that he claimed had not been included in the sale.

=== Postwar ===
After the Revolutionary War, Talbot settled in Johnstown, the seat of Fulton County, New York, where he purchased the former manor house and estate of William Johnson, the city founder. He was a member of the New York State Assembly in 1792 and 1792 to 1793.

=== Congress and United States Navy ===
In January 1793, Talbot was elected as a Federalist from New York to the 3rd United States Congress, serving from March 4, 1793, to approximately June 5, 1794, when President George Washington chose him third in a list of six captains of the newly established United States Navy. During his time in Congress, he was one of nine representatives to vote against the Eleventh Amendment to the United States Constitution. He was ordered to superintend the construction of the frigate USS President at New York. On April 20, 1796, the construction of President was suspended, and Talbot was discharged from the Navy.

With the outbreak of the Quasi-War with the French First Republic, Talbot was re-commissioned as a captain in the United States Navy on May 11, 1798. He served as commander of USS Constitution from June 5, 1799, until September 8, 1801, sailing it to the West Indies, where he protected American commerce from French privateers during the Quasi-War. He commanded the U.S. Navy squadron which operated off the French colony of Saint-Domingue from 1799 to 1800 and was commended by the Secretary of the Navy for protecting American commerce and for laying the foundation of permanent trade with the colony. Talbot was reportedly wounded 13 times and carried 5 bullets in his body.

Talbot resigned from the Navy on September 21, 1801, and died in New York City on June 30, 1813. He was buried in Trinity Churchyard in lower Manhattan.

== Legacy and honors ==
The first USS Talbot (Torpedo Boat No. 15) was named for Lt. John Gunnell Talbot, no relation to Silas Talbot; the second and third Talbots (Talbot (DD-114/APD 7) and Talbot (DEG/FFG-4), respectively) were named for Captain Silas Talbot.

Talbot was an original member of the Rhode Island Society of the Cincinnati.

Battery Talbot (1899–1919), named for Silas Talbot in G.O. 30, March 19, 1902, was a reinforced concrete Endicott Period 4.72-inch coastal gun battery on Fort Adams, Newport County, Rhode Island. Both of the original guns from this battery survive. One is on display at Equality Park in Newport, and the other is at Fort Moultrie National Park near Charleston, South Carolina.

There is a cenotaph in honor of Captain Talbot in the Dighton Congregational Church cemetery in his hometown of Dighton, Massachusetts.

== See also ==
- John Paul Jones
- Thomas Truxtun
- Bibliography of early American naval history

== Bibliography ==
- Bradford, James C. (1955). Quarterdeck and bridge: two centuries of American naval leaders. Naval Institute Press. p. 455. ISBN 1-55750-073-8.
- Cooper, James Fenimore (1856). History of the navy of the United States of America. Stringer & Townsend, New York. pp. 508. OCLC 197401914.
- Fowler, William M. (1995). Silas Talbot: Captain of Old Ironsides. Mystic, Connecticut: Mystic Seaport Museum. ISBN 0-913372-73-0.
- Heitman, Francis B. (1914). Historical Register of Officers of the Continental Army. The Rare Bookshop Publishing Company Inc. p. 531.
- McKee, Christopher (1991). A Gentlemanly and Honorable Profession: The Creation of the U.S. Naval Officer Corps, 1794-1815. Naval Institute Press. p. 600. ISBN 9780870212833.
- Jennings, John (1966). Tattered Ensign The Story of America's Most Famous Fighting Frigate, U.S.S. Constitution. Thomas Y. Crowell. OCLC 1291484.
- Statham, Edward Phillips (1910). Privateers and privateering. With eight illustrations. Hutchinson & co / James Pott & Co., New York. p. 382.
- Tuckerman, Henry (2009). The Life of Silas Talbot. Applewood Books, Bedford, Massachusetts. p. 148. ISBN 9781429021593.
- "Ships Histories Dictionary of American Naval Fighting Ships". Dictionary of American Naval Fighting Ships. Department of the Navy - Naval Historical Center. Archived from the original on August 19, 2000.

U.S. House of Representatives
New district	Member of the U.S. House of Representatives from New York's 10th congressional district 1793–1794	Succeeded by William Cooper
