= John Barnwell (senator) =

American politician (circa 1748 – 1800)

John Barnwell (July 15, 1748 – August 27, 1800) was a soldier and public official from South Carolina.

He was the son of Nathaniel Barnwell and Mary Gibbes. During the American Revolution, he served in the South Carolina Provincial Congress (1775–1776) and the first South Carolina General Assembly (1776). As a major in the South Carolina militia during the American Revolutionary War, he was captured at Charlestown in 1780 and was later released in a prisoner exchange. He was appointed a general in the South Carolina militia after the war.

He frequently served in the South Carolina Senate from 1778 until his death. He was elected to the Confederation Congress in 1784 but did not attend. He was a member of the state convention to ratify the United States Constitution in 1788. In 1795, he was elected to the 4th United States Congress but declined to serve.

Barnwell County, South Carolina, is named for him, or possibly his brother Robert Barnwell or his grandfather John Barnwell. Other relatives include Robert Woodward Barnwell and Senator Robert Barnwell Rhett.
