= Ezekiel Gilbert =

American politician

Ezekiel Gilbert (March 25, 1756 – July 17, 1841) was an American lawyer and politician from Hudson, New York. He served in the state Assembly and represented New York in the United States House of Representatives from 1793 until 1797.

Gilbert was born in Middletown, Connecticut on March 25, 1756; pursued classical studies, and graduated from Yale College in 1778; At Yale, he was a member of the secret society, Brothers in Unity. He consequently studied law; was admitted to the bar and commenced practice in Hudson, N.Y.; member of the State assembly in 1789 and 1790; elected as a Pro-Administration candidate to the Third Congress and reelected as a Federalist to the Fourth Congress (March 4, 1793 – March 3, 1797); resumed the practice of law; again a member of the State assembly in 1800 and 1801; clerk of Columbia County 1813–1815; died in Hudson, New York on July 17, 1841. He was also a slave owner.

U.S. House of Representatives
Preceded by James Gordon	Member of the U.S. House of Representatives from New York's 6th congressional district 1793–1797	Succeeded by Hezekiah L. Hosmer
