= List of United States representatives in the 6th Congress =

This is a complete list of United States representatives during the 6th United States Congress listed by seniority. For the most part, representatives are ranked by the beginning of their terms in office.

As an historical article, the districts and party affiliations listed reflect those during the 6th Congress (March 4, 1799 – March 3, 1801). Seats and party affiliations on similar lists for other congresses will be different for certain members.

This article describes the criteria for seniority in the House of Representatives and sets out the list of members by seniority. It is prepared on the basis of the interpretation of seniority applied to the House of Representatives in the current congress. In the absence of information to the contrary, it is presumed that the twenty-first-century practice is identical to the seniority customs used during the 6th Congress.

== House seniority ==
Seniority in the House, for representatives with unbroken service, depends on the date on which the members first term began. That date is either the start of the Congress (4 March in odd numbered years, for the era up to and including the 73rd Congress starting in 1933) or the date of a special election during the Congress. Since many members start serving on the same day as others, ranking between them is based on alphabetical order by the last name of the representative.

Representatives in early congresses were often elected after the legal start of the Congress. Representatives are attributed with unbroken seniority, from the legal start of the congressional term, if they were the first person elected to a seat in a Congress. The date of the election is indicated in a note.

The seniority date is normally taken from the members entry in the Biographical Directory of the United States Congress, except where the date given is the legal start of the Congress and the actual election (for someone who was not the first person elected to the seat in that Congress) was later. The date of election is taken from United States Congressional Elections 1788-1997. In a few instances the latter work provides dates, for the start and end of terms, which correct those in the Biographical Directory.

The Biographical Directory normally uses the date of a special election, as the seniority date. However, mostly in early congresses, the date of the member taking his seat can be the one given. The date of the special election is mentioned in a note to the list below, when that date is not used as the seniority date by the Biographical Directory.

Representatives who returned to the House, after having previously served, are credited with service equal to one less than the total number of terms they served. When a representative has served a prior term of less than two terms (i.e., prior term minus one equals less than one), he is ranked above all others whose service begins on the same day.

== Leadership ==
In this Congress, the only formal leader was the speaker of the House. Two speakership ballots were held on December 2, 1799, and Theodore Sedgwick (F-MA) was elected.

Candidate	1st ballot	2nd ballot
Theodore Sedgwick (F-MA)	42	44
Nathaniel Macon (DR-NC)	27	38
George Dent (F-MD)	13	3
John Rutledge, Jr. (F-SC)	2	1
Thomas Sumter (DR-SC)	1	0

== Standing committees ==
The House created its first standing committee, on April 13, 1789. There were four standing committees, listed in the rules of the 6th Congress. In addition there was a Ways and Means Committee. Although the Ways and Means Committee was not formally added to the main list of standing committees until 1802, the 2011 committee considers it to be a forerunner.

Committees, in this period, were appointed for a session at a time and not necessarily for every one in a Congress. The Speaker appointed the members.

This list refers to the standing committees of the House in the 6th Congress, the year of establishment as a standing committee, the number of members assigned to the committee and the dates of appointment in each session, the end of the session and its chairman. Chairmen, who were re-appointed after serving in the previous Congress, are indicated by an *.

No.	Committee	From	Members	Appointed	Chairman
1	Claims	1794	7	December 5, 1799 – May 14, 1800	*Dwight Foster (F-MA)
1	Claims	1794	7	November 20, 1800 – March 3, 1801	Nathaniel Macon (DR-NC)
2	Commerce and Manufactures	1795	7	December 5, 1799 – May 14, 1800	*Samuel Smith (DR-MD)
2	Commerce and Manufactures	1795	7	November 18, 1800 – March 3, 1801	*Samuel Smith (DR-MD)
3	Elections	1789	7	December 5, 1799 – May 14, 1800	Samuel W. Dana (F-CT)
3	Elections	1789	7	November 18, 1800 – March 3, 1801	George Dent (F-MD)
4	Revisal and Unfinished Business	1795	3	December 5, 1799 – May 14, 1800	Roger Griswold (F-CT)
4	Revisal and Unfinished Business	1795	3	November 20, 1800 – March 3, 1801	Jonas Platt (F-NY)
5	Ways and Means	[1794]	9	December 9, 1799 – May 14, 1800	*Robert G. Harper (F-SC)
5	Ways and Means	[1794]	9	November 20, 1800 – March 3, 1801	Roger Griswold (F-CT)

== List of representatives by seniority ==
A numerical rank is assigned to each of the 106 members initially elected to the 6th Congress. Other members, who were not the first person elected to a seat but who joined the House of Representatives during the 6th Congress, are not assigned a number.

Four representatives-elect were not sworn in, as two died and two resigned. The list below includes the representatives-elect (with name in italics), with the seniority they would have held if they had been sworn in.

Party designations used in this article are DR for Democratic-Republican members and F for Federalist representatives. Designations used for service in the first three congresses are (A) for Anti-Administration members and (P) for Pro-Administration representatives.

U.S. House seniority
Rank	Representative	Party	District	Seniority date	Notes
Six consecutive terms
1	Thomas Hartley	F	PA-8	March 4, 1789	(P) 1789–95. Died December 21, 1800, while still serving as a member of the House.
2	Josiah Parker	F	VA-11	March 4, 1789	(A) 1789–93; (P) 1793–95. Elected to this Congress: April 24, 1799. Last term while serving as a member of the House.
3	George Thatcher	F	MA-14	March 4, 1789	(P) 1789–95. Last term while serving as a member of the House. (elected to 7th Congress but not sworn in).
Five consecutive terms
4	Andrew Gregg	DR	PA-9	March 4, 1791	(A) 1791-95
5	William B. Grove	F	NC-7	March 4, 1791	(P) 1791-95
6	John W. Kittera	F	PA-7	March 4, 1791	(P) 1791–95. Last term while serving as a member of the House.
7	Nathaniel Macon	DR	NC-5	March 4, 1791	(A) 1791–95. Chairman: Claims (1800–01).
Five non-consecutive terms
8	Theodore Sedgwick	F	MA-1	March 4, 1799	Previously served (P) 1789-95 and (F) 1795-June 1796. Speaker of the House. Last term while serving as a member of the House.
Four consecutive terms
9	George Dent	F	MD-1	March 4, 1793	(P) 1793–95. Chairman: Elections (1800–01). Last term while serving as a member of the House.
10	Dwight Foster	F	MA-4	March 4, 1793	(P) 1793–95. Chairman: Claims (1799–1800). Resigned on June 6, 1800, while still serving as a member of the House.
11	Henry Glen	F	NY-8	March 4, 1793	(P) 1793–95. Last term while serving as a member of the House.
12	Anthony New	DR	VA-16	March 4, 1793	(A) 1793–95. Elected to this Congress: April 24, 1799.
13	John Nicholas	DR	VA-18	March 4, 1793	(A) 1793–95. Elected to this Congress: April 24, 1799. Last term while serving as a member of the House.
14	Samuel Smith	DR	MD-5	March 4, 1793	(A) 1793–95. Chairman: Commerce and Manufactures.
15	Philip Van Cortlandt	DR	NY-3	March 4, 1793	(A) 1793-95
16	Peleg Wadsworth	F	MA-13	March 4, 1793	(P) 1793-95
17	Robert G. Harper	F	SC-5	February 9, 1795	(P) February 9-March 3, 1795. Chairman: Ways and Means (1799–1800). Last term while serving as a member of the House.
Four non-consecutive terms
18	Thomas Sumter	DR	SC-4	March 4, 1797	Previously served (A) 1789-93 while as a member of the House.
19	Abiel Foster	F	NH-al	March 4, 1795	Previously served (P) June 22, 1789–91 while as a member of the House.
20	Aaron Kitchell	DR	NJ-2	March 4, 1799	Previously served (P) 1791-93 and January 29 – March 3, 1795; (F) 1795-97 while as a member of the House. Last term while serving as a member of the House.
Three consecutive terms
21	Samuel J. Cabell	DR	VA-14	March 4, 1795	Elected to this Congress: April 24, 1799
22	Albert Gallatin	DR	PA-12	March 4, 1795	Last term while serving as a member of the House (elected to 7th Congress but not sworn in)
23	Chauncey Goodrich	F	CT-al	March 4, 1795	Last term while serving as member of the House.
24	Roger Griswold	F	CT-al	March 4, 1795	Chairman: Revisal and Unfinished Business (1799–1800). Chairman: Ways and Means (1800–01).
25	Jonathan N. Havens	DR	NY-1	March 4, 1795	Died, as Representative-elect: October 25, 1799
26	Edward Livingston	DR	NY-2	March 4, 1795	Last term while serving as a member of the House until 18th Congress
27	Samuel Lyman	F	MA-3	March 4, 1795	Resigned on November 6, 1800, while serving as a member of the House.
28	John Reed Sr.	F	MA-6	March 4, 1795	Last term while serving as a member of the House.
29	Richard Thomas	F	PA-3	March 4, 1795	Last term while serving as a member of the House.
30	Joseph B. Varnum	DR	MA-9	March 4, 1795	
31	William Craik	F	MD-3	December 5, 1796	Last term while serving as a member of the House.
32	Samuel Sewall	F	MA-10	December 7, 1796	Resigned on January 10, 1800, while serving as a member of the House.
33	Samuel W. Dana	F	CT-al	January 3, 1797	Chairman: Elections (1799–1800)
Three non-consecutive terms
34	Theodorus Bailey	DR	NY-5	March 4, 1799	Previously served (A) 1793-95 and (DR) 1795–97. Last term while serving as a member of the House until seated in the 7th Congress.
35	Gabriel Christie	DR	MD-6	March 4, 1799	Previously served (A) 1793-95 and (DR) 1795-97 while as a member of the House. Last term while serving as a member of the House.
36	Peter Muhlenberg	DR	PA-4	March 4, 1799	Previously served (A) 1789-91 and 1793-95 while as a member of the House. Last term while serving as a member of the House (elected to 7th Congress but not sworn in)
37	Joshua Seney	DR	MD-7	March 4, 1799	Previously served (A) 1789-92 while as a member of the House. Died, as Representative-elect: October 20, 1798.
Two consecutive terms
38	George Baer, Jr.	F	MD-4	March 4, 1797	Last term while serving as a member of the House until 14th Congress
39	James A. Bayard	F	DE-al	March 4, 1797	
40	Christopher G. Champlin	F	RI-al	March 4, 1797	Last term while serving as a member of the House.
41	Matthew Clay	DR	VA-6	March 4, 1797	Elected to this Congress: April 24, 1799
42	Thomas T. Davis	DR	KY-1	March 4, 1797	Elected to this Congress: May 7, 1799
43	John Dawson	DR	VA-15	March 4, 1797	Elected to this Congress: April 24, 1799
44	John Dennis	F	MD-8	March 4, 1797	
45	Lucas C. Elmendorf	DR	NY-4	March 4, 1797	
46	Thomas Evans	F	VA-12	March 4, 1797	Elected to this Congress: April 24, 1799. Last term while serving as a member of the House.
47	John Fowler	DR	KY-2	March 4, 1797	Elected to this Congress: May 7, 1799
48	Jonathan Freeman	F	NH-al	March 4, 1797	Last term while serving as a member of the House.
49	William Gordon	F	NH-al	March 4, 1797	Resigned on June 12, 1800, while still serving as a member of the House.
50	John A. Hanna	DR	PA-6	March 4, 1797	
51	David Holmes	DR	VA-2	March 4, 1797	Elected to this Congress: April 24, 1799
52	James H. Imlay	F	NJ-4	March 4, 1797	Last term while serving as a member of the House.
53	Matthew Lyon	DR	VT-1	March 4, 1797	Last term while serving as a member of the House until 8th Congress
54	Harrison G. Otis	F	MA-8	March 4, 1797	Last term while serving as a member of the House.
55	John Rutledge, Jr.	F	SC-2	March 4, 1797	
56	William Shepard	F	MA-2	March 4, 1797	
57	Richard Stanford	DR	NC-4	March 4, 1797	
58	Abram Trigg	DR	VA-4	March 4, 1797	Elected to this Congress: April 24, 1799
59	John J. Trigg	DR	VA-5	March 4, 1797	Elected to this Congress: April 24, 1799
60	Robert Williams	DR	NC-3	March 4, 1797	
61	John Allen	F	CT-al	April 10, 1797	Resigned, as Representative-elect: c. August 1799
62	Lewis R. Morris	F	VT-2	May 22, 1797	
63	William Edmond	F	CT-al	November 13, 1797	Last term while serving as a member of the House (elected to 7th Congress but not sworn in)
64	William Claiborne	DR	TN-al	November 23, 1797	Elected to this Congress: August 1–2, 1799. Last term (elected to 7th Congress but not sworn in).
65	Thomas Pinckney	F	SC-1	November 23, 1797	Last term while serving as a member of the House.
66	Bailey Bartlett	F	MA-11	November 27, 1797	Last term while serving as a member of the House.
67	Peleg Sprague	F	NH-al	December 15, 1797	Resigned, as Representative-elect: c. October 1799
68	Joseph Hiester	DR	PA-5	December 1, 1798	
69	Jonathan Brace	F	CT-al	December 3, 1798	Resigned 1800
70	Joseph Eggleston	DR	VA-9	December 3, 1798	Elected to this Congress: April 24, 1799. Last term while serving as a member of the House.
71	Robert Waln	F	PA-1	December 3, 1798	Last term while serving as a member of the House.
72	Robert Brown	DR	PA-4	December 4, 1798	
73	Richard D. Spaight	DR	NC-10	December 10, 1798	Last term while serving as a member of the House.
Two non-consecutive terms
74	William Cooper	F	NY-10	March 4, 1799	Previously served (F) 1795-97 while as a member of the House. Last term while serving as a member of the House.
75	George Jackson	DR	VA-3	March 4, 1799	Previously served (DR) 1795-97 while as a member of Elected to this Congress: April 24, 1799.
76	John Smilie	DR	PA-11	March 4, 1799	Previously served (A) 1793-95 while as a member of the House.
One term
77	Willis Alston	DR	NC-9	March 4, 1799	
78	John Bird	F	NY-6	March 4, 1799	
79	Phanuel Bishop	DR	MA-7	March 4, 1799	Elected to this Congress: June 6, 1799
80	John Brown	F	RI-al	March 4, 1799	Only term while serving as a member of the House.
81	John Condit	DR	NJ-1	March 4, 1799	
82	Franklin Davenport	F	NJ-5	March 4, 1799	Only term while serving as a member of the House.
83	John Davenport	F	CT-al	March 4, 1799	
84	Joseph Dickson	F	NC-1	March 4, 1799	Only term while serving as a member of the House.
85	Samuel Goode	DR	VA-8	March 4, 1799	Elected to this Congress: April 24, 1799.
86	Edwin Gray	DR	VA-10	March 4, 1799	Elected to this Congress: April 24, 1799.
87	Archibald Henderson	F	NC-2	March 4, 1799	
88	William H. Hill	F	NC-6	March 4, 1799	
89	Benjamin Huger	F	SC-3	March 4, 1799	
90	James Jones	F	GA-al	March 4, 1799	Died on January 11, 1801, while still serving as a member of the House.
91	Henry Lee	F	VA-19	March 4, 1799	Elected to this Congress: April 24, 1799. Only term while serving as a member of the House.
92	Silas Lee	F	MA-12	March 4, 1799	
93	Michael Leib	DR	PA-2	March 4, 1799	
94	James Linn	DR	NJ-3	March 4, 1799	Only term while serving as a member of the House.
95	John Marshall	F	VA-13	March 4, 1799	Elected to this Congress: April 24, 1799. Resigned, to become Secretary of State: June 7, 1800.
...	Joseph H. Nicholson	DR	MD-7	March 4, 1799	Special election before start of term
96	Abraham Nott	F	SC-6	March 4, 1799	Only term while serving as a member of the House.
97	Robert Page	F	VA-1	March 4, 1799	Elected to this Congress: April 24, 1799. Only term while serving as a member of the House.
98	Jonas Platt	F	NY-9	March 4, 1799	Chairman: Revisal and Unfinished Business (1800–01). Only term while serving as a member of the House.
99	Leven Powell	F	VA-17	March 4, 1799	Elected to this Congress: April 24, 1799. Only term while serving as a member of the House.
100	John Randolph	DR	VA-7	March 4, 1799	Elected to this Congress: April 24, 1799
101	David Stone	DR	NC-8	March 4, 1799	Only term while serving as a member of the House (elected to 7th Congress but not sworn in)
102	Benjamin Taliaferro	F	GA-al	March 4, 1799	
103	John C. Thomas	F	MD-2	March 4, 1799	Only term while serving as a member of the House.
104	John Thompson	DR	NY-7	March 4, 1799	Only term while serving as a member of the House until 10th Congress.
105	Lemuel Williams	F	MA-5	March 4, 1799	Elected to this Congress: August 29, 1799
106	Henry Woods	F	PA-10	March 4, 1799	
Members joining the House, after the start of the Congress
...	Elizur Goodrich	F	CT-al	September 16, 1799	Special election. Only term while serving as a member of the House. (elected to 7th Congress but did not serve).
...	James Sheafe	F	NH-al	November 18, 1799	Special election. Only term while serving as a member of the House.
...	John Smith	DR	NY-1	February 6, 1800	Special election: December 27–29, 1799
...	John C. Smith	F	CT-al	November 17, 1800	Special election: September 15, 1800
...	Samuel Tenney	F	NH-al	November 18, 1800	Special election: October 27, 1800
...	Nathan Read	F	MA-10	November 25, 1800	Special election: October 20, 1800
...	Littleton W. Tazewell	DR	VA-13	November 26, 1800	Special election: July 31, 1800. Only term while serving as a member of the House.
...	Levi Lincoln	DR	MA-4	December 15, 1800	Special election
...	John Stewart	DR	PA-8	January 15, 1801	Special election
...	Ebenezer Mattoon	F	MA-3	February 2, 1801	Special election: December 15, 1800
Non voting members
a	William H. Harrison	-	OH-al	March 4, 1799	Delegate for Northwest Territory (most population in future OH). Resigned to become Territorial Governor of IN: May 14, 1800.
b	William McMillan	-	OH-al	November 24, 1800	Delegate for Northwest Territory (after July 4, 1800, only future OH). Special election.

== See also ==
- 6th United States Congress
- List of United States congressional districts
- List of United States senators in the 6th Congress
