= Elizur =

Elizur is a given name. Notable people with the given name include:

- Elizur Goodrich (1761–1849), American lawyer and politician
- Elizur Goodrich (clergyman) (1734-1797), American clergyman and scholar
- Elizur K. Hart (1841–1893), American politician
- Elizur Holyoke (c.1618—1676), English colonist in the modern-day USA
- Elizur H. Prindle (1829–1890), American politician
- Elizur G. Webster (1829-1900), American silversmith
- Elizur Wright (1804–1885), American mathematician and abolitionist

== See also ==
- Elizur (biblical figure)
