= East Cemetery (Litchfield, Connecticut) =

Cemetery in Litchfield, Connecticut, United States

East Cemetery also known as the East Burying Ground is an historic cemetery in Litchfield, Connecticut, United States. In September 1754, a committee was chosen to lay out a burying ground and the layout was recorded in town property records in January 1755. It was the third cemetery established in Litchfield but also the largest. The property was later enlarged in 1837, and the stone wall in front constructed in 1850.

Many of Connecticut's Revolutionary War-era political and economic elites are buried in the cemetery.

== Notable interrments ==
- John Allen
- Charles B. Andrews
- Uriel Holmes
- John Henry Hubbard
- Edward W. Seymour
- Benjamin Tallmadge
- Frederick A. Tallmadge
- Emily Noyes Vanderpoel
- Henry W. Wessells
- John Whedon
- Oliver Wolcott, signer of the United States Declaration of Independence and the Articles of Confederation
- George Catlin Woodruff
