= Eliécer =

Eliécer or Eliecer is a given name. Notable people with the name include:

- Ricardo Eliécer Neftalí Reyes Basoalto (1904–1973), known as Pablo Neruda, Chilean poet-diplomat and politician, won the Nobel Prize for Literature in 1971
- Eliécer Cárdenas (1950–2021), Ecuadorian novelist
- Eliecer Castillo (born 1970), Cuban professional boxer in the heavyweight division
- Eliécer Silva Celis (1914–2007), Colombian anthropologist, archaeologist, professor and writer
- Eliécer Ellis (born 1945), Panamanian former basketball player who competed in the 1968 Summer Olympics
- Eliécer Espinosa (born 1996), Colombian footballer
- Jorge Eliécer Gaitán (1903–1948), left-wing Colombian politician and charismatic leader of the Liberal Party
- Jorge Eliécer Julio (born 1969), Colombian former professional boxer who competed from 1989 to 2003
- Eliecer Navarro (born 1987), minor league baseball pitcher in the Pittsburgh Pirates organization
- Eliecer Montes de Oca (born 1971), Cuban baseball player and Olympic gold medalist
- Eliécer Pérez (born 1972), Cuban sport shooter

== See also ==
- Jorge Eliecer Gaitan Museum, museum in Bogota, Colombia
- Eleazar
- Eli Azur
- Eliezer
- Elizer
- Elizur
