= Elizur Goodrich =

American politician

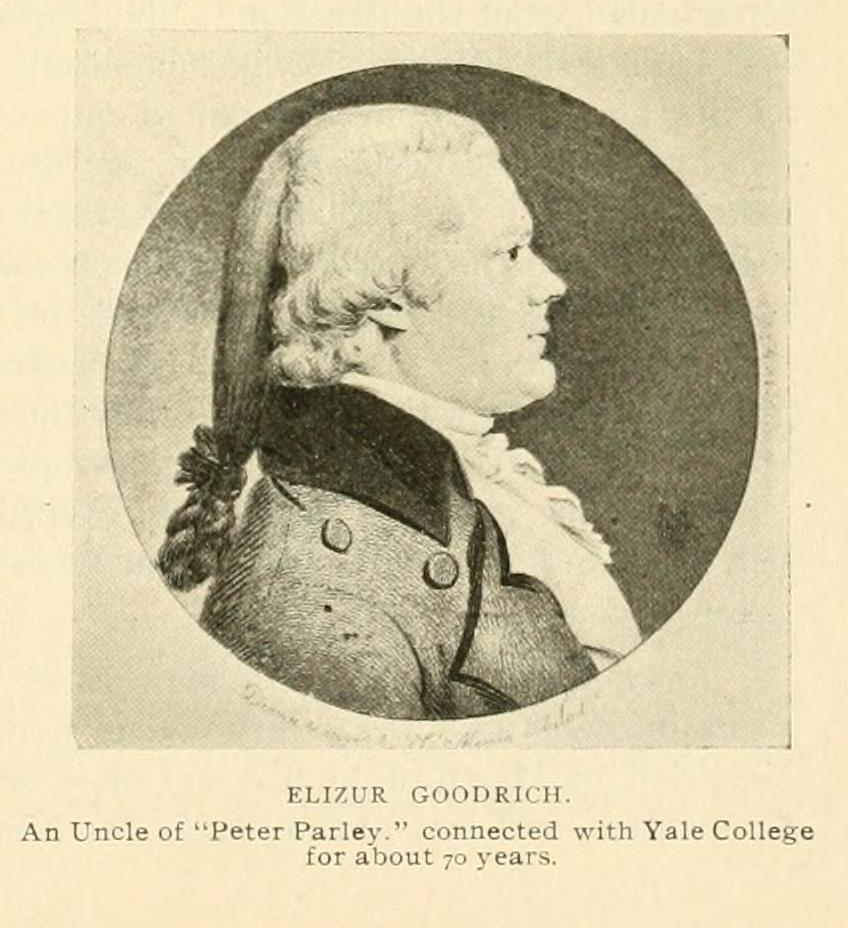
- A portrait of Elizur Goodrich from The Connecticut Quarterly

Member of the U.S. House of Representatives from Connecticut's at-large district
- In office March 4, 1799 – March 3, 1801
- Preceded by: Jonathan Brace
- Succeeded by: John Davenport

Collector of Customs
- In office 1801–1803

Member of the Connecticut House of Representatives
- In office 1795-1802

Personal details
- Born: March 24, 1761 Durham, Connecticut Colony, British America
- Died: November 1, 1849 (aged 88) New Haven, Connecticut, U.S.
- Citizenship: American
- Party: Federalist
- Spouse: Annie Willard Allen Goodrich
- Relations: Chauncey Goodrich (brother), John Allen (brother-in-law)
- Children: Chauncey Allen Goodrich
- Parent: Elizur Goodrich
- Education: Yale College
- Occupation: Lawyer, Politician, Judge

Elizur Goodrich (March 24, 1761 – November 1, 1849) was an eighteenth-century American lawyer and politician from Connecticut. He served as a United States representative from Connecticut and Collector of Customs. He was also the brother of US Senator Chauncey Goodrich, son-in-law of Founding Father Oliver Wolcott.

== Biography ==
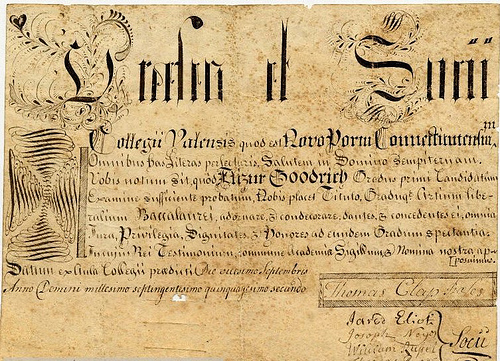
Bachelor of Arts degree, Elizur Goodrich Sr., father of Elizur Goodrich, Yale College, 1752

Born in Durham in the Connecticut Colony, he was the son of Elizur Goodrich. He graduated from Yale College in 1779, was a tutor there from 1781 to 1783, and studied law. After his was admitted to the bar in 1783, he began the practice of law in New Haven. He served in the Connecticut House of Representatives from 1795 to 1802 and was its Clerk for six sessions and its Speaker for two.

In the 1796 United States presidential election he was a Federalist elector for president, supporting Federalist candidate John Adams against Democratic-Republican Party candidate Thomas Jefferson.

He was elected to represent Connecticut At-Large to the Sixth and Seventh Congresses, but only served in the Sixth Congress from March 4, 1799, to March 3, 1801 because President John Adams appointed him collector of customs for the Port of New Haven. After a short time he was removed from the office of collector by Adams' successor, President Thomas Jefferson. The discussion of this act elicited from Jefferson a letter in which he avowed his approval of removal for political opinions.

Goodrich was elected to the Governor's Council in Connecticut in 1803, serving until 1818. He taught law at Yale from 1801 to 1810 and was probate judge from 1802 to 1818. From 1803 to 1822 he was also Mayor of New Haven. From 1803 to 1807, he also served as a judge of the Connecticut Supreme Court of Errors.

Goodrich was a member of the Yale Corporation, the university's governing body, from 1809 to 1818 and was its Secretary from 1818 to 1846. Yale conferred the degree of LL.D. on him in 1830. Goodrich died in New Haven on November 1, 1849, and is interred in Grove Street Cemetery.

He was featured among the 1,700 Congressmen who are on the List of members of the US Congress who owned slaves at one point in American history.

== Personal life ==
Goodrich's son, Chauncey Allen Goodrich, married Noah Webster's daughter. His brother, also named Chauncey Goodrich, was a member of the United States House of Representatives.

Goodrich's wife, Annie Willard Allen Goodrich, was the sister of John Allen, a United States representative from Connecticut and a member of the Connecticut Supreme Court of Errors.

His sister-in-law, Mary Ann Wolcott Goodrich, through his brother Senator Chauncey Goodrich, was the daughter of the Signatory of the US Declaration of Independence, Oliver Wolcott, and sister of US Treasury Secretary Oliver Wolcott Jr.

U.S. House of Representatives
Preceded by Nathaniel Smith	Member of the U.S. House of Representatives from Connecticut's at-large congressional district March 4, 1799 – March 3, 1801	Succeeded by Calvin Goddard
Political offices
Preceded by Samuel Bishop	Mayor of New Haven, Connecticut; 1803 – 1822	Succeeded by George Hoadley
