= John Allen (Connecticut politician) =

American politician

Member of the U.S. House of Representatives from Connecticut's at-large district
- In office March 4, 1797 – March 3, 1799
- Preceded by: Samuel W. Dana
- Succeeded by: Bailey Bartlett

Connecticut Supreme Court of Errors
- In office 1774–1776

Member of the Connecticut House of Representatives
- In office 1793-1796

Personal details
- Born: June 12, 1763 Great Barrington, Province of Massachusetts Bay, British America
- Died: July 31, 1812 (aged 49) Litchfield, Connecticut, U.S.
- Citizenship: United States
- Party: Federalist
- Spouse: Ursula McCurdy Allen
- Relations: Elizur Goodrich
- Children: John W. Allen and Ursula Allen
- Education: Litchfield Law School
- Occupation: Lawyer, Politician

John Allen (June 12, 1763 – July 31, 1812) was an eighteenth-century lawyer and politician. He served as a United States representative from Connecticut and as a member of the Connecticut Supreme Court of Errors.

== Early life and career ==
Allen was born in Great Barrington in the Province of Massachusetts Bay. He attended the common schools and taught school in Germantown, Pennsylvania and New Milford, Connecticut, before studying law at the Litchfield Law School from 1784 to 1786. Allen was admitted to the bar in 1786 and began the practice of law in Litchfield, Connecticut.

Allen began his political career as a member of the Connecticut House of Representatives, serving in the State House from 1793 to 1796. He served as clerk of the State House in 1796. He was elected as a Federalist candidate to the Fifth Congress, serving from March 4, 1797, to March 3, 1799. He was a proponent of the Alien and Sedition Acts. He declined to be a candidate for renomination in 1798.

He was a member of the State council and of the Supreme Court of Errors from 1800 to 1806. He continued the practice of law in Litchfield until his death in 1812. Allen is interred in East Cemetery in Litchfield.

== Personal life ==
Allen married Ursula McCurdy, a graduate of the Litchfield Female Academy. They had two children, John W. Allen and Ursula Allen, who married to abolitionist Congressman Sherlock James Andrews. Their son John W. Allen was a U.S. representative from Ohio from March 4, 1837, to March 3, 1841, and previously, an Ohio State Senator.

Allen's sister, Annie Willard Allen Goodrich, was married to Elizur Goodrich, a U.S. representative from Connecticut, serving from March 4, 1799, to March 3, 1801, and brother of U.S. Senator Chauncey Goodrich. They were members of the family of socialite Mary Ann Wolcott Goodrich, Founding Father Oliver Wolcott, and U.S. Secretary of the Treasury Oliver Wolcott Jr., among others.

U.S. House of Representatives
Preceded by Zephariah Swift	Member of the U.S. House of Representatives from Connecticut's at-large congressional district 1797-1799	Succeeded by John Davenport
