= Oliver Wolcott House =

Historic house in Connecticut, United States

- U.S. National Register of Historic Places
- U.S. National Historic Landmark
- U.S. National Historic Landmark District – Contributing property
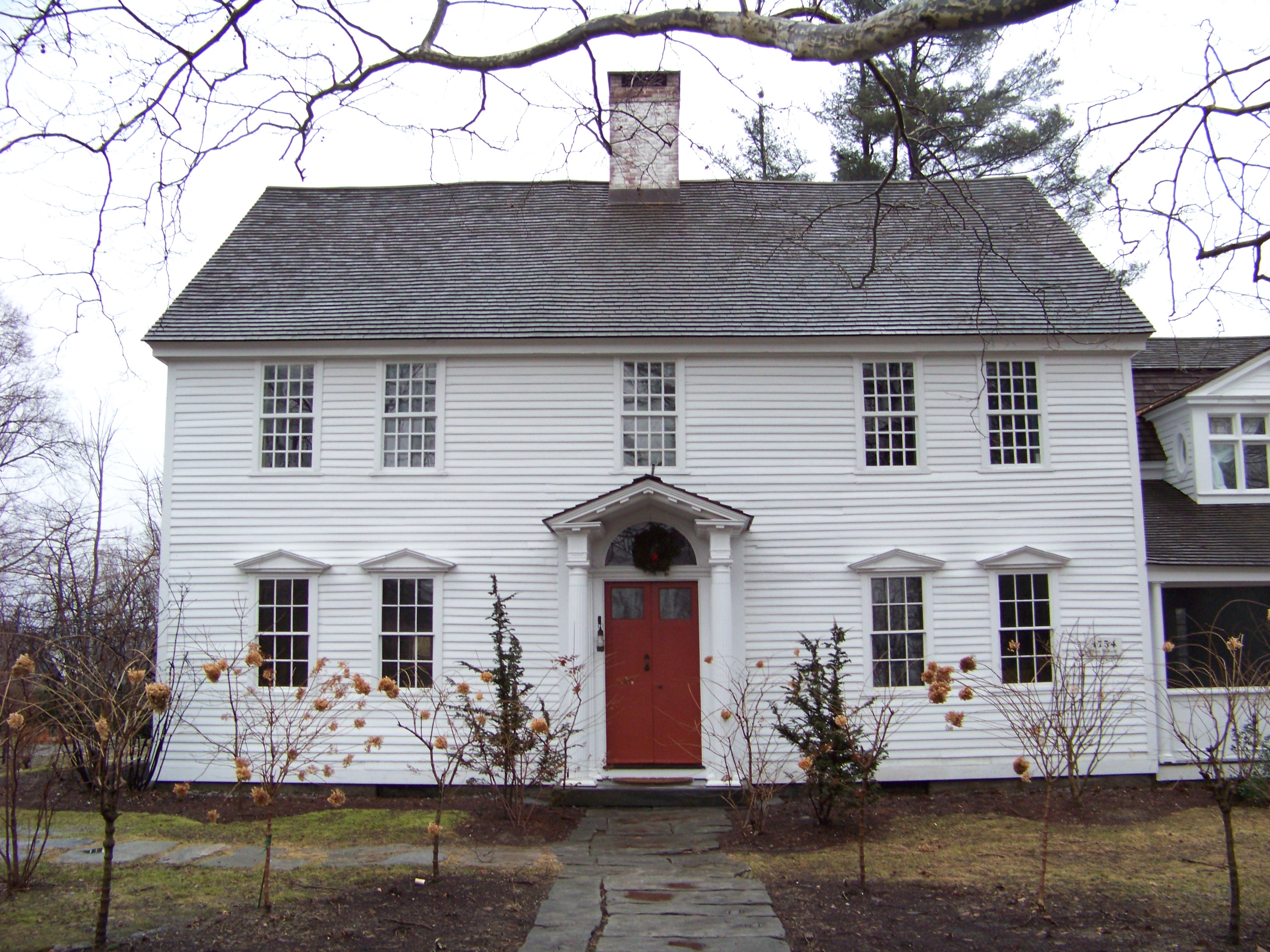
- House in 2010

- Location within Connecticut Location within the United States
- Location: Litchfield, CT
- Coordinates: 41°44′36″N 73°11′16″W
- Area: 12 acres (4.9 ha)
- Built: 1753
- Architect: Oliver Wolcott
- Architectural style: Federal
- Part of: Litchfield Historic District (ID68000050)
- NRHP reference No.: 71001011

Significant dates
- Added to NRHP: November 11, 1971
- Designated NHL: November 11, 1971
- Designated NHLDCP: November 24, 1968

The Oliver Wolcott House is a historic colonial home at South Street near Wolcott Avenue in Litchfield, Connecticut. It was built in 1753 by Founding Father Oliver Wolcott Sr., a signer of the Declaration of Independence and the Articles of Confederation, and a state militia leader in the American Revolutionary War. It is the oldest house in the borough. It was the home of Oliver Wolcott Sr. (1726–1797), and is where his son Oliver Wolcott Jr., was born. Many distinguished guests visited the Wolcott House, including Lafayette and George Washington, who stayed there in 1780 during his first visit to Litchfield. The house was declared a National Historic Landmark in 1971. It is located on South Street, nearly opposite to Wolcott Avenue. The house is not open to the public.

== Description and history ==
The Wolcott House is a 2 1/2-story wood-frame structure, five bays wide, with a side-gable roof and a large central chimney. A 1 1/2-story gambrel-roofed ell extends south from the main block, and a two-story service wing extends to the rear. The main entrance is sheltered by a Federal period pediment supported by fluted columns and topped by a broken-gable pediment.

The house was built in 1753 by Oliver Wolcott, Sr., the son of Roger Wolcott, who was the colonial governor of Connecticut at the time of the house's construction. Wolcott lived in the house until his death in 1797. For most of the 20th century the house was also owned by Wolcott descendants.

Oliver Wolcott, Sr. was born in Windsor, Connecticut (in a part that is now South Windsor) in 1726. He graduated from Yale College in 1747 and then studied medicine. He moved to Litchfield in 1751, and quickly became one of its leading citizens, serving as sheriff, judge, and member of the colonial legislature. He was an active supporter of independence in the American Revolution, serving as a delegate to the Continental Congress from 1775 to 1783, during which time he signed the United States Declaration of Independence. He was also active in the state militia, commanding a brigade at the Second Battle of Saratoga in October 1777, and overseeing Connecticut's defenses later in the war. In 1784 he served on the delegation which negotiated the Treaty of Fort Stanwix with the remains of the Iroquois Confederacy. He served two consecutive partial terms as Governor of Connecticut, from January 1796 (taking over from Samuel Huntington, who died in office), until his own death in office in December 1797.

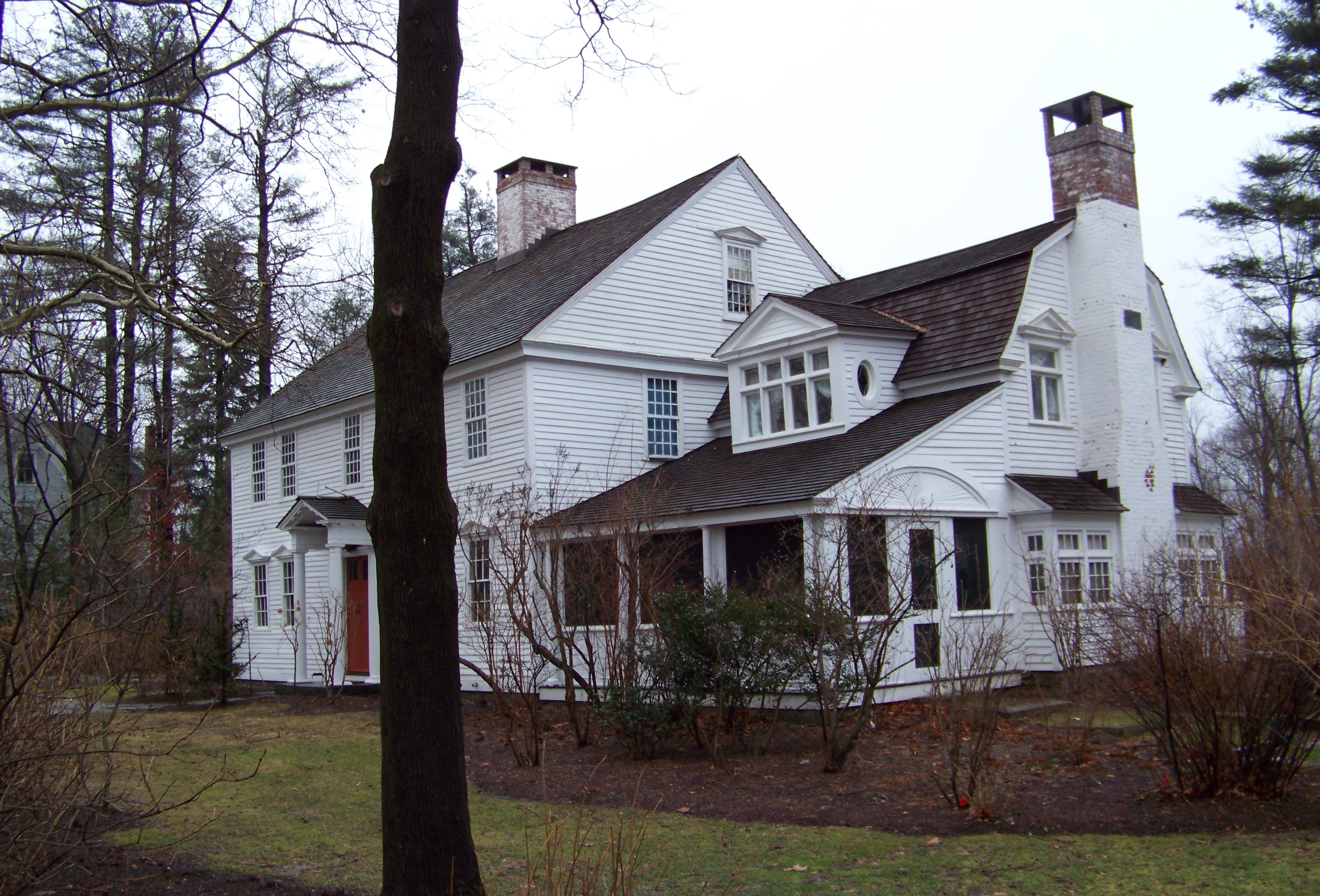
House from side-front

== See also ==
- List of National Historic Landmarks in Connecticut
- National Register of Historic Places listings in Litchfield County, Connecticut
- List of Washington's Headquarters during the Revolutionary War
