= Caspar Friedrich Hachenberg =

Caspar Friedrich Hachenberg (14 December 1709 (baptised) – 1 April 1793), was rector of the Latin school of Wageningen, The Netherlands (1740–1789) and writer of Greek and Latin grammars.

Hachenberg was born in 1709 at Neuwied, the son of the town secretary Friedrich Wilhelm Hachenburg and Charlotte Albertine Bachoven. He studied theology at the university of Marburg and the Gymnasium Illustre of Bremen, and started his working career in Jemgum in East Friesland, Germany, probably as a reformed parson.

== Rector in Wageningen ==
On 10 September 1740 the government of the town of Wageningen appointed Hachenberg to the post of rector of the local Latin School. His predecessor Clement Olpe had unexpectedly died in August, and the city council feared that the '10 or 12 disciples' from other places would leave town if a new rector did not arrive soon. At the time, the staff of the school existed of merely one person: the rector. The annual remuneration existed of 350 guilders, plus four carts of peat. This salary was augmented by the tuition fees that each pupil had to pay the rector (12 guilders per annum, except for the highest class, where the fee was 18 guilders), the rent from pupils who lived in the rector's house, and the tuition fees of private lessons which the rector was allowed to give.

Within a few years Hachenberg proved himself an excellent teacher, attracting pupils from all over the country. In 1746 Hachenberg was asked to become rector of the Latin School of Gorinchem. Wageningen did not want to lose 'such an honourable & able man': Hachenberg's salary was raised to 550 guilders annually, he was rewarded a complimentary 250 guilders, and free housing was promised to him, which he got one year later in a brand new building which also housed the school.

In 1750 Hachenberg received offers from other towns, to wit Tiel and Zaltbommel, prompting Hachenberg to inform the Wageningen governors that he was willing to stay, if an extra room with a chimney was made in the attic of his house, and he get a salary increase of 50 guilders. The town agreed to the room, but also told him there were no funds for an increase of salary. Nevertheless, Hachenberg stayed. His salary may not have been raised, but he was given a bonus almost every year, plus the extra income mentioned above. Those extras must have been considerable, for even an offer in 1761 to become rector of the Latin School in Dordrecht, with a salary of no less than 1300 guilders, could not persuade Hachenberg to leave Wageningen.

On 11 February 1789 Hachenberg resigned his office due to his high age and an increasing deafness. The town gave him an annual pension of 350 guilders. Hachenberg died at Wageningen, on 1 April 1793.

== Family ==
In 1749 Hachenberg married Willemina van Setten (Wageningen 1727 – Wageningen 1818), with whom he had seven children.

== Published work ==
Hachenberg wrote his own text-books: in 1759 his plans to publish a new Rudimenta are mentioned, and also a Grammar which he had published a few years earlier. No existing copies of those works are known. Other works by Hachenberg are:

- De significatione praepositionum Graecarum in compositis et generalia quaedam de ratione compositionis vocum Graecarum (Utrecht 1771)
- Phaedri augusti liberti fabularum Aesopiarum libri quinque of De fabelen van van Phaedrus, aangaande de woorden en zaaken tot gebruik der jeugd in 't Nederduitsch verklaard (Wageningen 1772).
- Vertoog over de welmeenende aanbieding van genade en zaligheid, zoo als die onder voorwaarde van geloof en bekeering allen, ook zulken, welke dezelve niet aannemen en verlooren gaan, door het Evangelium gedaan wordt (Wageningen and Utrecht 1774).
- Grammaticae Graecae, in two parts: pars prior and pars posterior (Utrecht 1791 and 1792). This last work formed the basis for Chauncey Allen Goodrich's Elements of Greek grammar, taken chiefly from the grammar of Caspar Frederick Hachenberg (New-Haven 1812, which saw four reprints). This book was for a long period the standard Greek grammar at Yale University.

== Sources ==
- City archives of Wageningen (Gemeentearchief Wageningen).
- Archives of the Van Zadelhoff family (Gemeentearchief Wageningen).
- M.J.C. Geels-Jansen: Een onderzoek naar de geschiedenis van de Latijnse en Franse School te Wageningen (Ede, 1982).
