= Chauncey A. Goodrich =

American clergyman, educator and lexicographer

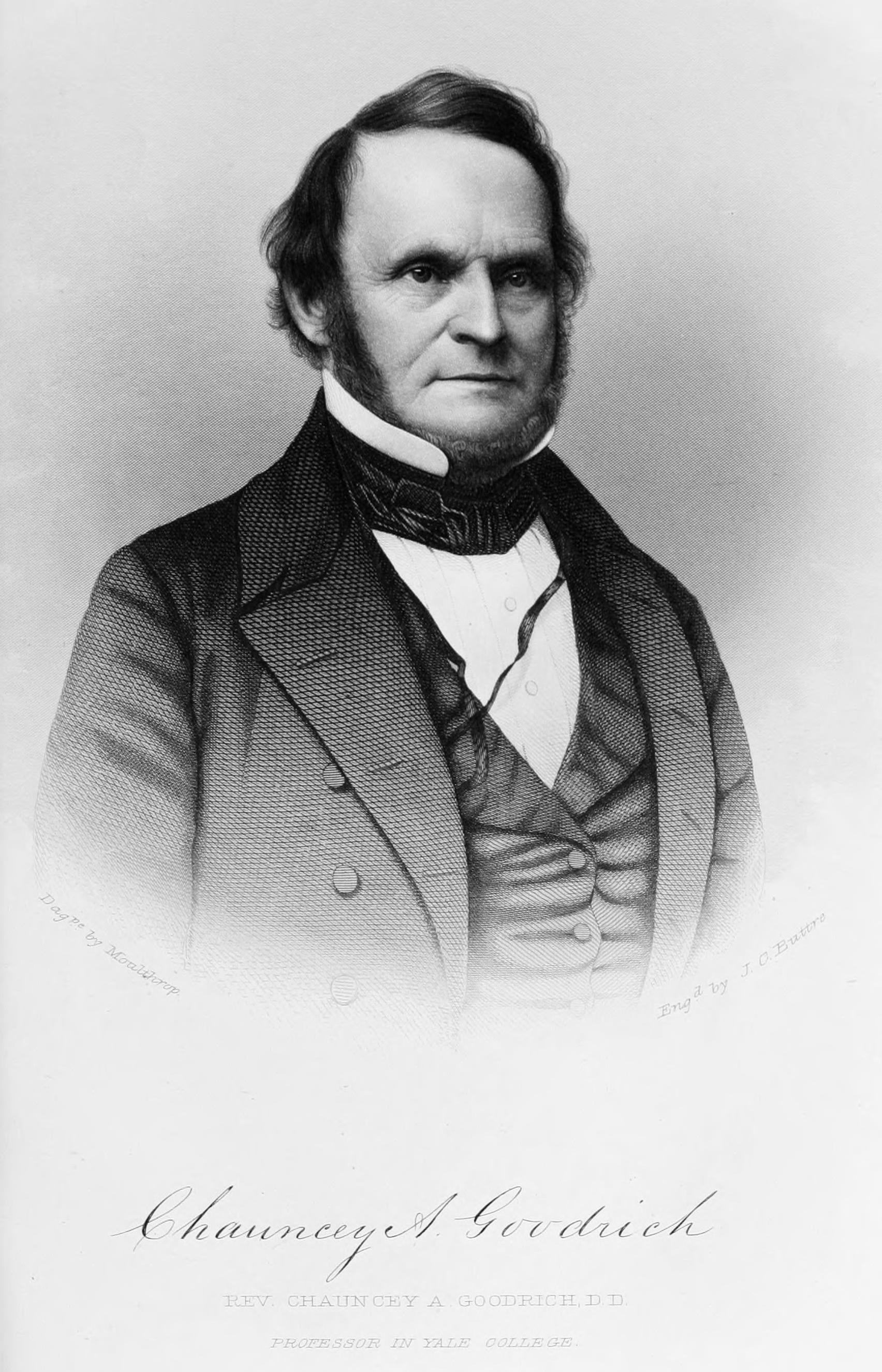
- Born: October 23, 1790; New Haven, Connecticut
- Died: February 25, 1860 (aged 69); New Haven, Connecticut
- Resting place: Grove Street Cemetery
- Occupations: Clergyman, lexicographer
- Father: Elizur Goodrich
- Relatives: Elizur Goodrich (grandfather); Chauncey Goodrich (uncle)

Chauncey Allen Goodrich (October 23, 1790 – February 25, 1860) was an American clergyman, educator and lexicographer. He was the son-in-law of Noah Webster and edited his Dictionary after his father-in-law's death.

== Family ==
Goodrich was the son of Elizur and Anne Willard (Allen) Goodrich. His father was a lawyer and member of the United States House of Representatives. He was also the grandson of the Reverend Elizur Goodrich. His uncle, also named Chauncey Goodrich, was also a member of the U.S. House of Representatives and a U.S. senator from Connecticut.

== Biography ==
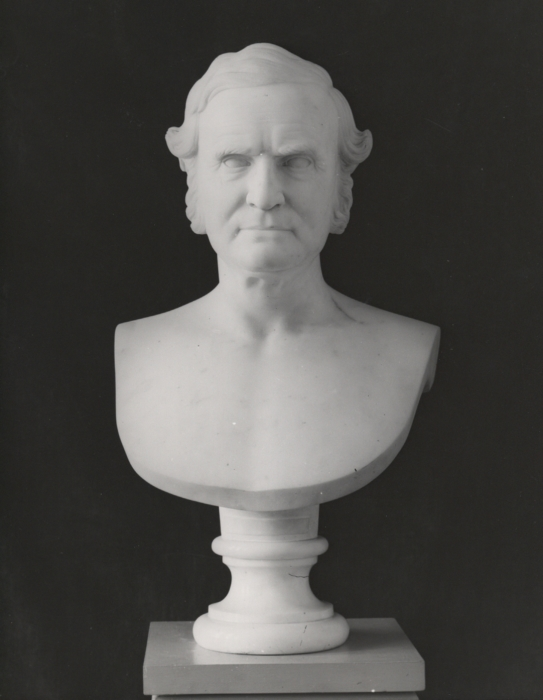
Marble bust of Chauncey Allen Goodrich, by Chauncey Ives, 1873. Yale University Art Gallery

Chauncey Allen Goodrich graduated from Yale in 1810, served as tutor there in 1812–1814, and afterward studied theology. He settled in Middletown, Connecticut, in 1810 as pastor of the Congregational church there, but feeble health obliged him to leave in 1817. In 1820 he was chosen president of Williams College, but declined the office. He was professor of rhetoric and oratory in Yale from 1817 until 1839 when he was transferred to the chair of pastoral theology in that institution, which he held till his death.

Goodrich exerted a wide influence, and co-operated with many learned societies. He was a liberal benefactor of the Yale Divinity School. The degree of D.D. was conferred on him by Brown University in 1835. Goodrich made numerous contributions to periodical literature, and in 1829 established the Christian Quarterly Spectator, with which he was connected nearly ten years, being its sole editor after 1830. While a tutor at Yale, Goodrich published a Greek grammar (1814) based on the grammar by C.F. Hachenberg, and in 1830, at the request of President Timothy Dwight, he prepared a textbook, Greek and Latin Lessons (1832), which was extensively used in New England.

Soon after the publication of the American Dictionary, by his father-in-law, Noah Webster (1828), Goodrich was entrusted by its author with power to superintend an abridgment of the work, which he did, conforming the orthography more nearly to the common standard. This edition, in the preparation of which he was assisted by Benjamin Silliman, Denison Olmsted, and others, was issued in 1847, and the “Universal” edition of the same work appeared in 1856. In 1859 the supplement was issued, to which comprehensive additions were made. At the time of his death Goodrich was engaged on a radical revision of the dictionary, but he died before the work received its final form, and it was published under the supervision of Noah Porter (1864). He was also engaged in preparing a new edition of the Bible, with English text, as one of the American Bible society's "committee on versions". Goodrich was also the author of Select British Eloquence (1852). A commemorative discourse by President Theodore D. Woolsey has been published as a pamphlet (New Haven, 1860).

Goodrich Street, a principal thoroughfare linking Prospect Street and Dixwell Avenue along the division between northern New Haven and southern Hamden in Connecticut, is named for him.
