= List of United States senators in the 6th Congress =

This is a list of United States senators during the 6th United States Congress listed by seniority from March 4, 1799, to March 3, 1801.

== Seniority rules ==
A Chronological List of United States Senators includes the following explanation of how it assigns seniority.

From 1789 to 1958, senators whose terms began on the same day are listed alphabetically. Beginning in 1959, senators are listed according to commencement of first Senate term by order of service, determined by former service in order as senator, vice president, House member, cabinet secretary, governor, and then by state population. This latter system for calculating order of service has been used by the modern Senate for many years for the purposes of office assignment. It is unclear just when the Senate first began applying such criteria.

Rank column: This consecutively numbers senators, serving in the relevant Congress, according to seniority in that Congress. Seniority is based upon the method used by the chronological list. If the senator is not the first person to hold the seat, no number is included in the list.

A senator with broken service is placed before other senators starting service on the same day, but after senators with unbroken service starting before that date.

Senate No. column: The chronological guide gives an official number to each senator. This is the number set out in this column. That number is retained even if the senator has broken service.

As an historical article, the states and party affiliations listed reflect those during the Congress. Seats and party affiliations on similar lists for other congresses will be different for certain members. During this Congress, there were two parties represented. Senators are classified as Democratic-Republican (DR) or Federalist (F).

== Terms of service ==
| Class | Terms of service of senators that expired in years |
|---|---|
| Class 3 | Terms of service of senators that expired in 1801 (CT, GA, KY, MD, NC, NH, NY, PA, SC, and VT.) |
| Class 1 | Terms of service of senators that expired in 1803 (CT, DE, MA, MD, NJ, NY, PA, RI, TN, VA, and VT) |
| Class 2 | Terms of service of senators that expired in 1805 (DE, GA, KY, MA, NC, NH, NJ, RI, SC, TN, and VA.) |

== U.S. Senate seniority list ==
| Rank | Historical rank | Senator (party-state) | Seniority date |
|---|---|---|---|
| 1 | 9 | James Gunn (F-GA) | March 4, 1789 |
| 2 | 13 | John Langdon (DR-NH) | March 4, 1789 |
| 3 | 26 | Theodore Foster (F-RI) | June 7, 1790 |
| 4 | 36 | John Brown (DR-KY) | June 18, 1792 |
| 5 | 43 | Samuel Livermore (F-NH) | March 4, 1793 |
| 6 | 47 | James Ross (F-PA) | April 24, 1794 |
| 7 | 48 | Stevens Thomson Mason (DR-VA) | November 18, 1794 |
| 8 | 50 | Henry Latimer (F-DE) | February 7, 1795 |
| 9 | 51 | William Bingham (F-PA) | March 4, 1795 |
| 10 | 52 | Timothy Bloodworth (DR-NC) | March 4, 1795 |
| 11 | 53 | Humphrey Marshall (F-KY) | March 4, 1795 |
| 12 | 54 | Elijah Paine (F-VT) | March 4, 1795 |
| 13 | 55 | Jacob Read (F-SC) | March 4, 1795 |
| 14 | 59 | Benjamin Goodhue (F-MA) | June 11, 1796 |
| 15 | 63 | Uriah Tracy (F-CT) | October 13, 1796 |
| 16 | 65 | John Laurance (F-NY) | November 9, 1796 |
| 17 | 67 | John Eager Howard (F-MD) | November 30, 1796 |
| 18 | 68 | James Hillhouse (F-CT) | December 6, 1796 |
| 19 | 70 | Joseph Inslee Anderson (DR-TN) | September 26, 1797 |
| 20 | 72 | Nathaniel Chipman (F-VT) | October 17, 1797 |
| 21 | 73 | Ray Greene (F-RI) | November 13, 1797 |
| 22 | 74 | James Lloyd (F-MA) | December 11, 1797 |
| 23 | 78 | James Watson (F-NY) | August 17, 1798 |
| 24 | 81 | Charles Pinckney (DR-SC) | December 6, 1798 |
| 25 | 82 | William Hill Wells (F-DE) | January 17, 1799 |
| 26 | 62 | William Cocke (DR-TN) | March 4, 1799 |
| 27 | 83 | Abraham Baldwin (DR-GA) | March 4, 1799 |
| 28 | 84 | Jonathan Dayton (F-NJ) | March 4, 1799 |
| 30 | 85 | Samuel Dexter (F-MA) | March 4, 1799 |
| 29 | 86 | Jesse Franklin (DR-NC) | March 4, 1799 |
| 31 | 87 | James Schureman (F-NJ) | March 4, 1799 |
| 32 | 88 | Wilson Cary Nicholas (DR-VA) | December 5, 1799 |
| 33 | 89 | Gouverneur Morris (F-NY) | April 3, 1800 |
| 34 | 90 | Dwight Foster (F-MA) | June 6, 1800 |
| 35 | 91 | John Armstrong Jr. (DR-NY) | November 6, 1800 |
| 36 | 92 | Jonathan Mason (F-MA) | November 14, 1800 |
| 37 | 93 | William Hindman (F-MD) | December 12, 1800 |
| 38 | 94 | Aaron Ogden (F-NJ) | February 28, 1801 |
| 39 | 95 | Samuel White (F-DE) | February 28, 1801 |

== See also ==
- 6th United States Congress
- List of United States representatives in the 6th Congress
