= Elizur G. Webster =

Former American silversmith

- Born: 1829; Hartford, Connecticut, U.S.
- Died: October 9, 1900 (aged 70–71); Warwick, New York, U.S.
- Resting place: Green-Wood Cemetery
- Occupation: Silversmith
- Known for: founder of E. G. Webster & Son
- Children: 4 sons

Elizur G. Webster (1829 - October 9, 1900) was an American silversmith and the founder of E. G. Webster & Son, a manufacturer of silverware.

== Life ==
Webster was born in 1829 in Hartford, Connecticut.

Webster opened a store at Atlantic and Fifth Avenues in Brooklyn in 1859. The firm became known as E. G. Webster & Son in 1873, and more stores were opened in Manhattan, Chicago and San Francisco. His brother, A. A. Webster, was actively involved in the firm until 1886. Webster designed silver holloware, including trays, mirror frames, bowls, and tea or coffee services.

With his wife and four sons (Frederic, George, Hawley and William), Webster resided at Greene and Clinton Avenues in Brooklyn, New York, and he had a second home in Warwick, New York. He died on October 9, 1900, in Warwick, and he was buried in Green-Wood Cemetery. He was worth an estimated $107,000 at the time of his death. The firm was acquired by the International Silver Company in 1928. Webster's son Frederic worked for the firm, and he died in 1941. It was acquired by Oneida Limited in 1981.

A catalogue of E. G. Webster & Son silverware is in the permanent collection of the Metropolitan Museum of Art. Silverware designed by E. G. and Son can be seen at the Brooklyn Museum, the Art Institute of Chicago, the Birmingham Museum of Art, and the National Museum of American History.
