= Emily Noyes Vanderpoel =

American painter

- Born: Emily Caroline Noyes; June 21, 1842; New York City
- Died: February 20, 1939 (aged 96)
- Known for: Painting, writer, historian
- Spouse: John Aaron Vanderpoel (m. 1865)

Emily Noyes Vanderpoel (June 21, 1842 – February 20, 1939) was an American artist, writer, and philanthropist. She is perhaps best remembered for her book Color Problems (1902), an early contribution to the color theory.

== Early life ==
Emily Caroline Noyes was born on June 21, 1842, in New York City to William Curtis Noyes and Julia Tallmadge Noyes. She was the great-granddaughter of Col. Benjamin Tallmadge. She was educated in private schools in New York, and later studied art under Robert Swain Gifford and William Sartain.

On May 22, 1865, she married John Aaron Vanderpoel, with whom she had one son, John Arent Vanderpoel. They lived in New York City and Litchfield, Connecticut. After a year her husband died before she gave birth. She remained unmarried.

== Career ==
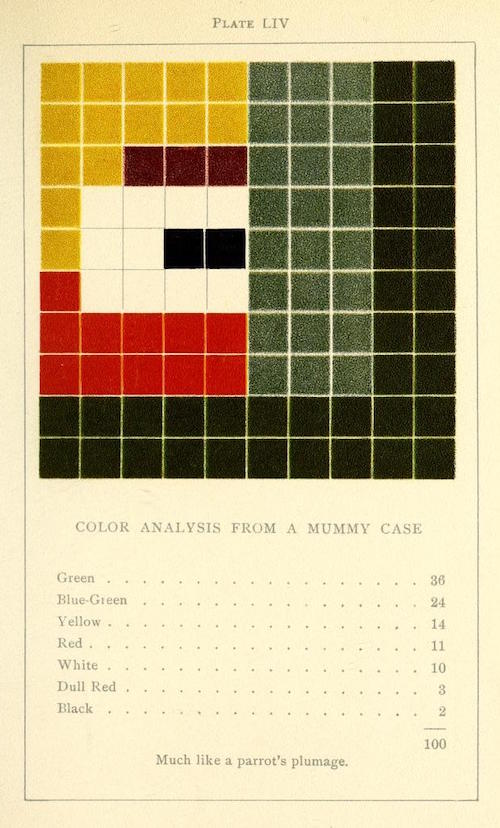
A color chart of a mummy case from 1902

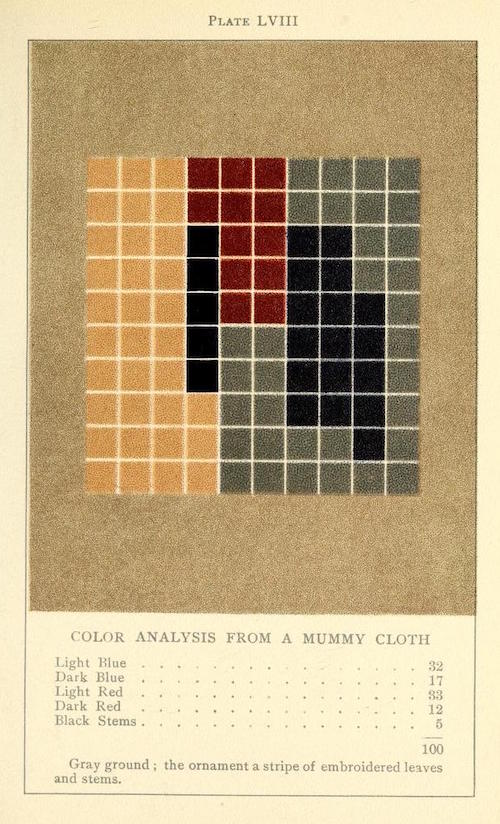
A color chart of a mummy cloth from 1902

Emily Noyes Vanderpoel was known for her work as a painter, working in watercolors and oils. She was a member of the New York Watercolor Club (of which she also served a term as Vice-President) and the Woman's Art Club of New York. She exhibited her work at the Woman's Building at the 1893 World's Columbian Exposition in Chicago, Illinois. There she was awarded a bronze medal.

Beyond her artistic career, Noyes Vanderpoel was also a philanthropist and an active participant in the Litchfield community. She was the Honorary President of the Needle and Bobbin Club of Litchfield, and the Vice-President and Curator of the Litchfield Historical Society, during which time she published a two-volume history of the Litchfield Female Academy. She was also extremely active, using her energy and her money, to provide a facelift for Litchfield, which made it the iconic Colonial town it now is. Noyes Vanderpoel played a prominent role in Litchfield's participation in the mid 19th century Colonial Revival Movement. She was behind almost every major historic preservation and conversation project, including the revamping of the business district and the restorations of the Congregational Church and the Litchfield Law School, the first law school in the country. She also helped to found local chapter of the Daughters of the American Revolution.

She was the author of the Color Problems, which was published in 1902. The book had 400 pages and 116 colour illustrations. Vanderpoel would create a ten by ten grid and then record the colors found in various objects, such as a cup and saucer or an Egyptian mummy. Vanderpoel recommended F.W. Moody's idea that nature's palettes were nearly always a good match. She suggested that a marquetry cabinet that was designed with the same colours as a dead sparrow would be "balanced". It has been suggested that her theories anticipate later writings, including Josef Albers' Interaction of Color (1963), but Vanderpoel was not attributed. Her book was brought back into print in 2018.

She died on February 20, 1939, and is buried in East Cemetery in Litchfield.

== Legacy ==
Vanderpoel donated her art pottery collection to the Litchfield Historical Society and her Japanese art collection to the Norwich Museum. Her legacy is also bound up in her preservation work in Litchfield. "What Vanderpoel was instrumental in creating is for the most part not a genuine Colonial townscape, but an idealized Colonial Revival landscape – significantly, one that many consider the finest example of Colonial Revival architecture in this country."

== Works ==
- Color problems: a practical manual for the lay student of color (1902)
- Chronicles of a pioneer school from 1792 to 1833 (1903)
- The tale of the spinning wheel (1903) (illustrator)
- American Lace and Lace-Makers (1924)
- More chronicles of a pioneer school, from 1792 to 1833 (1927)
