= Chauncey Goodrich =

American politician (1759–1815)

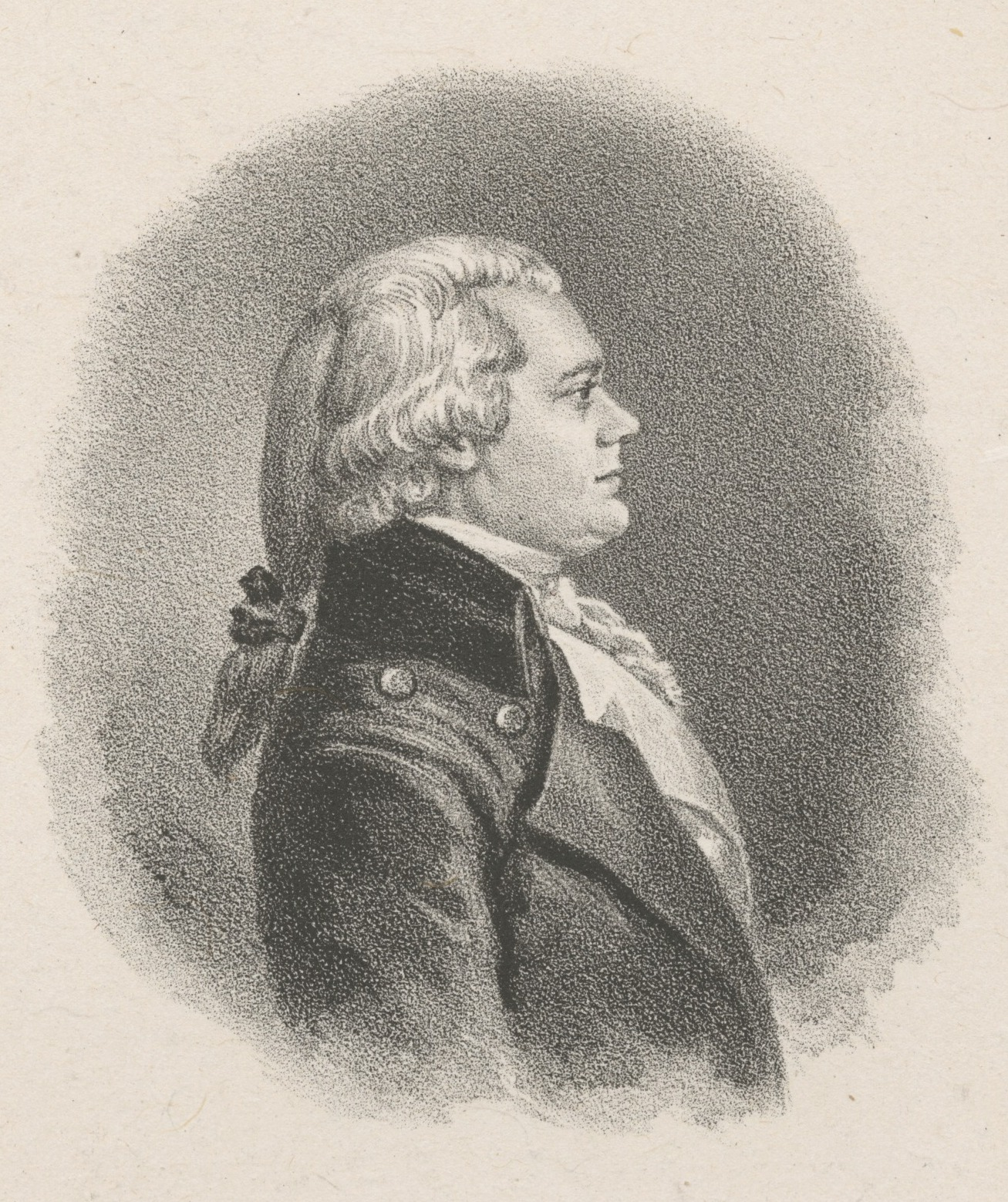

United States Senator from Connecticut
- In office October 25, 1807 – May 13, 1813
- Preceded by: Uriah Tracy
- Succeeded by: David Daggett

Member of the U.S. House of Representatives from Connecticut's at-large district
- In office March 4, 1795 – March 3, 1801
- Preceded by: Amasa Learned
- Succeeded by: Elias Perkins

28th Lieutenant Governor of Connecticut
- In office 1813–1815
- Governor: John Cotton Smith
- Preceded by: John Cotton Smith
- Succeeded by: Jonathan Ingersoll

Member of the Connecticut House of Representatives
- In office 1793-1794

Personal details
- Born: October 20, 1759 Durham, Connecticut Colony, British America
- Died: August 18, 1815 (aged 55) Hartford, Connecticut, U.S.
- Party: Federalist
- Spouse: Mary Ann Wolcott Goodrich
- Parent: Elizur Goodrich (father)
- Relatives: Elizur Goodrich (brother)

Chauncey Goodrich (October 20, 1759 – August 18, 1815) was an American lawyer and politician from Connecticut who represented that state in the United States Congress as both a senator (1807 to 1813) and a representative (1795 to 1801).

== Biography ==
Goodrich was born in Durham in the Connecticut Colony, the brother of Elizur Goodrich. His father was Congregational minister Elizur Goodrich. He graduated from Yale in 1776 and taught school afterward. From 1779 to 1781, he taught at Yale. After studying law, he was admitted to the Connecticut Bar in 1781, practicing in Hartford.

=== Political career ===
He served in the Connecticut House of Representatives from 1793 to 1794, when he was elected as a Federalist to the Fourth Congress from the Second District of Connecticut following an unsuccessful campaign for Congress in 1793. He was re-elected to the Fifth and Sixth Congresses, serving from March 4, 1795, to March 3, 1801. In the Sixth Congress, he served with his brother Elizur Goodrich.

Returning to Connecticut, he resumed his law practice and was on the Governor's Council from 1802 to 1807, simultaneously service as a judge of the Connecticut Supreme Court of Errors. The Connecticut General Assembly elected him to the United States Senate to complete the term of Uriah Tracy, who died, and re-elected him to a full term. On June 17, 1812, he voted against war with Britain, but the vote for war was 19 to 13.

He served in the Senate in the Tenth, Eleventh, Twelfth, and Thirteenth Congresses from October 25, 1807, to May 1813.

He elected Mayor of Hartford in 1812 and became Lieutenant Governor of Connecticut. He held both offices until his death. In 1814 and 1815, he was a Connecticut delegate to the Hartford Convention.

== Family ==
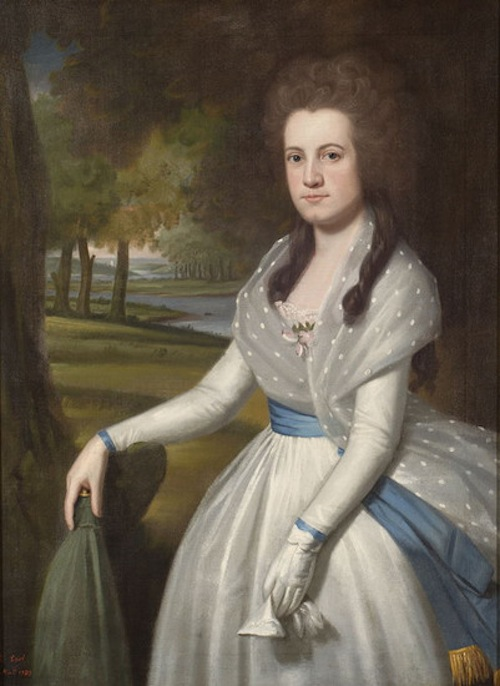
Mary Ann Wolcott, portrait by Ralph Earl

Goodrich was married to Mary Ann Wolcott, daughter of Oliver Wolcott, a signer of the Declaration of Independence. His nephew Chauncey Allen Goodrich was the son-in-law of Noah Webster and edited his Dictionary after Webster's death.

== Death ==
Goodrich died on August 18, 1815, in Hartford and was buried in Old North Cemetery.

U.S. House of Representatives
Preceded by Amasa Learned	Member of the U.S. House of Representatives from Connecticut's at-large congressional district 1795–1801	Succeeded by Elias Perkins
U.S. Senate
Preceded by Uriah Tracy	U.S. senator (Class 3) from Connecticut; 1807–1813; Served alongside: James Hillhouse, Samuel W. Dana	Succeeded by David Daggett
Political offices
Preceded by John Cotton Smith	Lieutenant Governor of Connecticut; 1813–1815	Succeeded by Jonathan Ingersoll
