= Elizur Goodrich (clergyman) =

American clergyman and scholar (1734–1797)

Elizur Goodrich (October 20, 1734 – November 22, 1797) was an American clergyman and scholar.

== Early life ==
Elizur Goodrich was born on October 20, 1734, in Wethersfield, Connecticut (now Rocky Hill). He graduated from Yale University in 1752. He later received a Doctor of Divinity from Princeton College in 1783.

== Career ==
Goodrich was a tutor at Yale from 1755 to 1756. He was ordained a Congregational minister and moved to Durham. He remained a pastor until 1797.

Goodrich worked as a teacher and over 20 years taught more than 300 young men. He was associated as a delegate to conventions and synods in New York and Philadelphia from 1766 to 1777. He was an astronomer and studied eclipses. He published an account of the aurora borealis in 1780. He had a large library.

Goodrich was one time a candidate for Governor of Connecticut and in 1777 he was proposed as president of Yale, but Ezra Stiles was elected with a small majority. He was a Yale fellow from 1770 to 1797 and served on the prudential committee under the presidencies of Stiles and Timothy Dwight IV.

Goodrich published sermons and addresses from 1761 to 1790.

== Personal life ==
Goodrich had two sons, Chauncey and Elizur. His grandson was Chauncey Allen Goodrich.

Goodrich died on November 22, 1797, in Norfolk.
