= John Davenport (Connecticut politician) =

American politician (1752–1830)

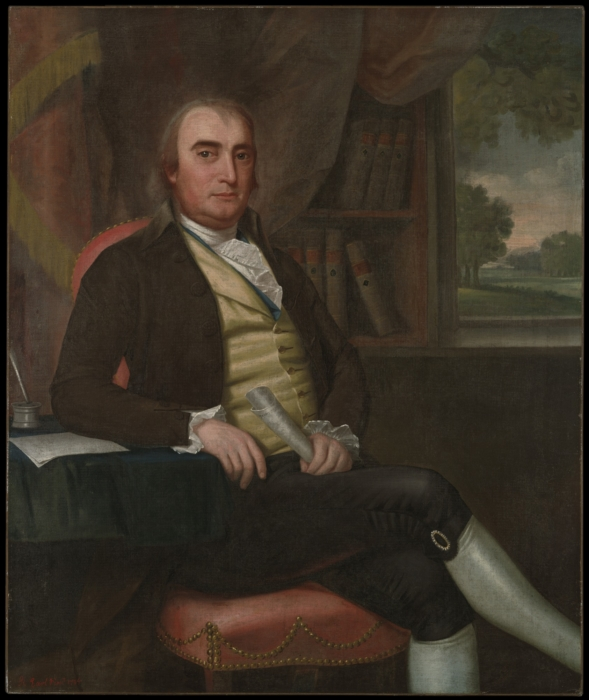
- John Davenport painted by Ralph Earl, 1794. Yale University Art Gallery

Dean of the United States House of Representatives
- In office April 9, 1816 – March 3, 1817
- Preceded by: Richard Stanford
- Succeeded by: Thomas Newton Jr.

Member of the U.S. House of Representatives from Connecticut's at-large district
- In office March 4, 1799 – March 3, 1817
- Preceded by: John Allen
- Succeeded by: Nathaniel Terry

Personal details
- Born: January 16, 1752 Stamford, Connecticut Colony, British America
- Died: November 28, 1830 (aged 78) Stamford, Connecticut, U.S.
- Party: Federalist
- Education: Yale College

Military service
- Allegiance: United States
- Branch/service: Continental Army
- Rank: Major
- Battles/wars: American Revolutionary War

John Davenport (January 16, 1752 – November 28, 1830) was a United States representative from Connecticut.

== Biography ==
Born in Stamford in the Connecticut Colony, he pursued academic studies, and graduated from Yale College in 1770. He engaged in teaching there in 1773 and 1774; he also studied law and was admitted to the bar in 1773, practicing in Stamford. He was a member of the Connecticut House of Representatives from 1776 to 1796, and served in the commissary department of the Continental Army during the Revolutionary War, attaining the rank of major in 1777.

Davenport was elected as a Federalist to the Sixth and to the eight succeeding Congresses, serving from March 4, 1799 to March 3, 1817. He was chairman of the Committee on Revisal and Unfinished Business during the Seventh Congress. He declined to be a candidate for reelection in 1816 and died in Stamford in 1830; interment was in North Field (now Franklin Street) Cemetery.

James Davenport, John's brother, also represented Connecticut in the House as a Federalist.

U.S. House of Representatives
Preceded by John Allen	Member of the U.S. House of Representatives from Connecticut's at-large congressional district 1799-1817	Succeeded by Nathaniel Terry
