= Mary Ann Wolcott Goodrich =

American socialite (1765–1805)

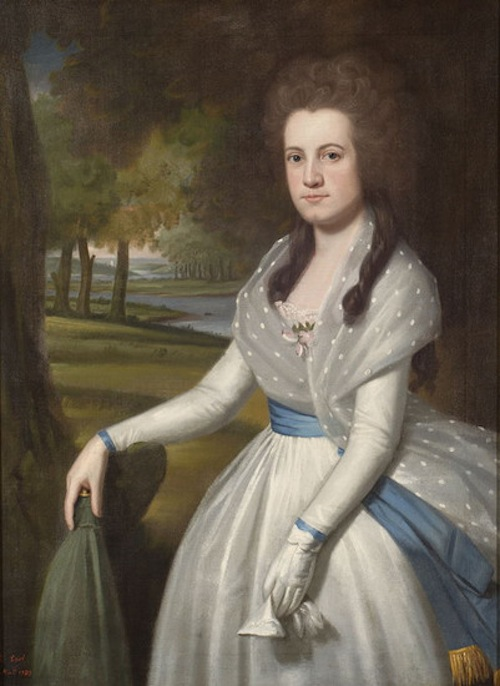
- Ralph Earl, Mary Ann Wolcott, 1789, Litchfield Historical Society, Litchfield, Connecticut
- Born: Mary Ann Wolcott; February 16, 1765
- Died: March 12, 1805 (aged 40)
- Other names: Given names: Maryann and Marianne; Surnames: Woolcott and Woolcott Goodrich

Mary Ann Wolcott Goodrich (1765–1805) was an American socialite in New York, Philadelphia, and Washington, D.C., moving with her husband Chauncey Goodrich as he served as a Representative and a Senator between 1795 and 1813. Her viewpoints were influential in the affairs of state, business and education.

== Early life ==
Mary Ann Wolcott was born on February 16, 1765 to Lauren (also Laura) Collins and Oliver Wolcott (1726–1797), a Founding Father. She and her brothers and sister grew up in Litchfield, Connecticut during the War of Independence (1775–1783). Her father signed the Declaration of Independence (July 4, 1776), and Wolcott helped her brothers Frederick and Oliver Wolcott Jr. and her sister Laura use a melted statue of King George III to make bullets for the war.

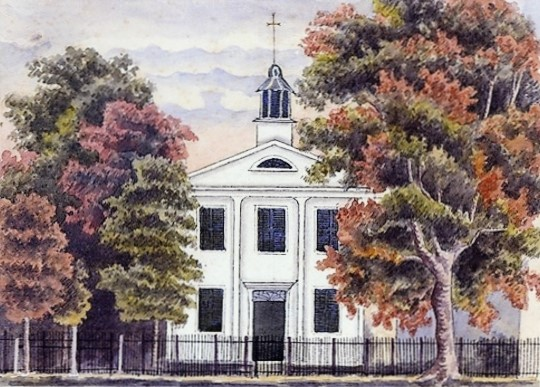
Emily Hart, The Litchfield Female Academy, watercolor, c. 1856

She was educated at the Litchfield Female Academy. Around 1777, when she was twelve years old, she was inoculated with the smallpox vaccine. At the time, her father wrote to her mother, Lauren Collins Wolcott, and voiced his concerns and hopes regarding how the vaccine might affect her. He wanted her to remain "beloved and esteemed".

Her father was the Lieutenant Governor of Connecticut (1786 to 1796) and the Governor of Connecticut (January 5, 1796 to December 1, 1797).

== Adulthood ==
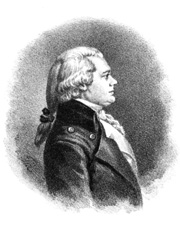
Chauncey Goodrich

Mary Ann Wolcott met Chauncey Goodrich (1759-1815), a lawyer and politician who was married briefly to Abigail Smith, who died in 1788. In 1789, Mary Ann Wolcott married Chauncey Goodrich (1759-1815), becoming Mary Ann Wolcott Goodrich. She lived with her husband in Connecticut, where Chancey was elected to the United States House of Representatives by 1795.

Goodrich went with her husband when he represented Connecticut in Congress and was a Senator from 1807 to 1813. During that time, the Goodriches were members of society in Washington, D.C., New York and Philadelphia. In New York, she visited her brother Oliver Wolcott Jr., who would become the United States Secretary of the Treasury. Rufus Wilmot Griswold described her as "one of the most distinguished beauties of her time". A British minister stated that she would be welcome among the British aristocracy due to "her charm, culture, intellect, and refinement".

The Litchfield Ledger states, "Her personality is captured through her correspondence with friends and family where she can write very sarcastically, mostly to lighten the mood of letter."

== Death ==
Goodrich died on March 12, 1805 at 40 years of age without having had children.

== Legacy ==
Goodrich and her sister Laura Woolcott Mosely, both described as brilliant, were said by Joseph Cooke Jackson to have,

accomplished so much for American society, education, letters, the Church, the army, the bench, the bar, and governments — state and national.
