= Oliver Wolcott =

American Founding Father and politician (1726–1797)

Oliver Wolcott Sr.
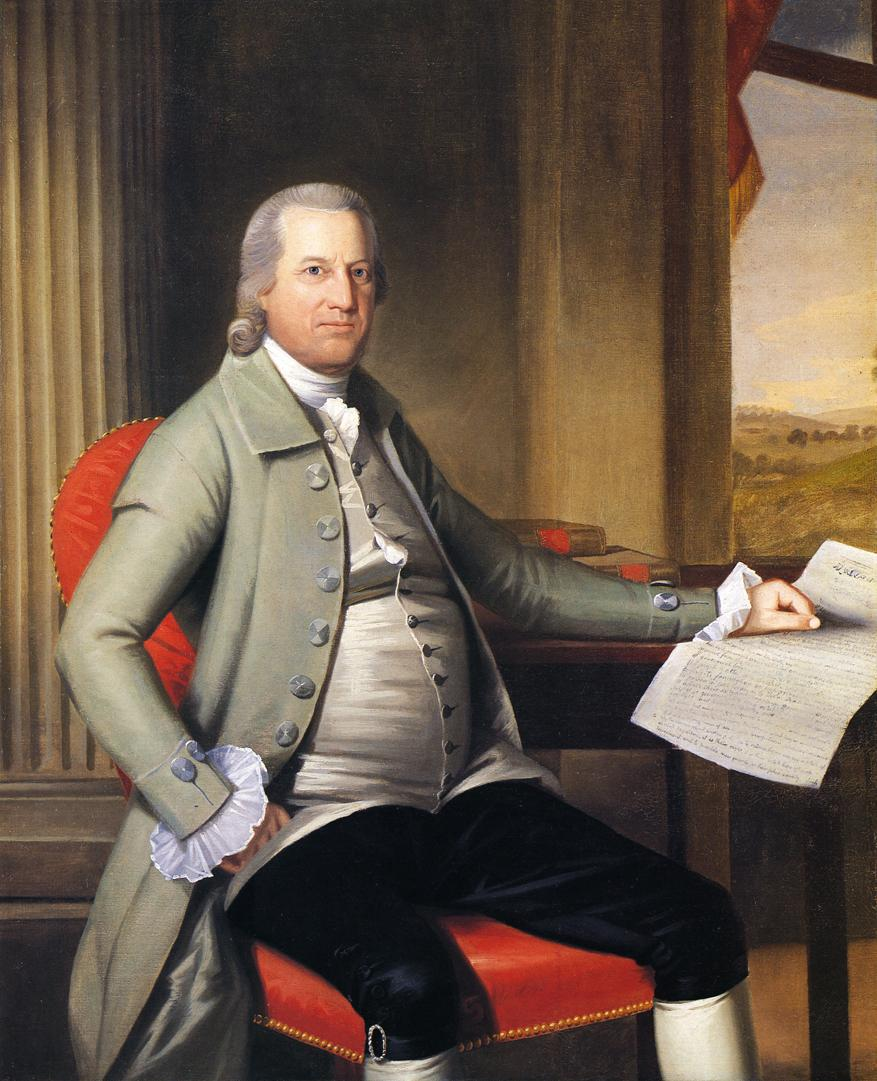
- Portrait by Ralph Earl

19th Governor of Connecticut
- In office January 5, 1796 – December 1, 1797
- Lieutenant: Jonathan Trumbull Jr.
- Preceded by: Samuel Huntington
- Succeeded by: Jonathan Trumbull Jr.

23rd Lieutenant Governor of Connecticut
- In office 1786–1796
- Governor: Samuel Huntington
- Preceded by: Samuel Huntington
- Succeeded by: Jonathan Trumbull Jr.

Personal details
- Born: Oliver Wolcott; November 20, 1726 Windsor, Connecticut, British America
- Died: December 1, 1797 (aged 71) Litchfield, Connecticut, U.S.
- Resting place: East Cemetery, Litchfield, Connecticut
- Party: Federalist
- Spouse: Laura Collins Wolcott
- Children: 5, including Oliver Wolcott Jr. and Mary Ann Wolcott Goodrich
- Parent(s): Roger Wolcott; Sarah Drake Wolcott
- Profession: Militia Officer, Politician

Oliver Wolcott Sr. (/ˈwʊlkət/ WUUL-kət; November 20, 1726 – December 1, 1797) was an American Founding Father and politician. He was a signer of the United States Declaration of Independence and the Articles of Confederation as a representative of Connecticut, and the nineteenth governor of Connecticut. Wolcott was a major general for the Connecticut militia in the Revolutionary War serving under George Washington.

== Early life ==
Coat of Arms of Oliver Wolcott Sr.

Oliver Wolcott was born on November 20, 1726 in Windsor, Connecticut, the son of colonial Governor Roger Wolcott and his wife Sarah Drake Wolcott. He was the second youngest of 15 siblings in total and the youngest of 10 who survived to adulthood. His elder brother was politician Erastus Wolcott. He attended Yale College, graduating in 1747 as the top scholar in his class. Upon graduation, New York Governor George Clinton granted Wolcott a captain's commission to raise a militia company to fight in the French and Indian Wars (King George's War (1744–1748)). Captain Wolcott served on the northern frontier defending the Canadian border against the French until the Treaty of Aix-la-Chapelle of 1748. He then moved to newly settled Goshen in northwestern Connecticut to practice and study medicine with his brother Alexander. Afterwards Wolcott moved to Litchfield and became a merchant; he was appointed sheriff of the newly-created Litchfield County, Connecticut, serving from 1751 to 1771. He married Lorraine (Laura) Collins of Guilford, Connecticut, on January 21, 1755. The couple had five children, four of whom lived past infancy. In order of birth they were: Oliver (1757), Oliver Jr. (1760–1833), Laura (1761–1814), Mariann (1765–1805), and Frederick (1767–1837).

=== American Revolutionary War ===
Wolcott had two careers during the war years as one of Connecticut's principal delegates to the Continental Congress and also a militia officer. He participated in the American Revolutionary War as brigadier general and then as major general in the Connecticut militia. As a representative in the Continental Congress, he was a strong advocate for independence.

Early in the growing struggle with Great Britain, Wolcott made it clear that the colonists would not give up their rights and privileges. In February 1776, he stated: "Our difference with Great Britain has become very great. What matters will issue in, I cannot say, but perhaps in a total disseverance from Great Britain." The early support for independence led him to important roles during the war, both as military leader and as member of the Continental Congress.

Wolcott saw extensive militia service during the American Revolution. On August 11, 1776, Connecticut officials ordered him to march the Seventeenth Regiment of militia to New York and join George Washington's army. Upon arriving at Washington's camp, Connecticut Governor Jonathan Trumbull appointed Wolcott brigadier general in command of all the state's militia regiments in New York. He led 300 to 400 volunteers from his brigade to help General Horatio Gates and Benedict Arnold defeat General John Burgoyne at the Battles of Saratoga.

In May 1779, Wolcott was promoted to major general in command of all Connecticut militia. That summer, he saw combat in attempting to protect the coastline from Tryon's raid. Defeated by Major-general William Tryon, he described Tryon's forces in his memoirs as "a foe who have not only insulted every principle which governs civilized nations but by their barbarities offered the grossest indignities to human nature."

=== Continental Congress ===
At the beginning of the Revolution, Congress had made Wolcott a commissioner of Indian affairs to persuade the northern Indian nations to remain neutral. His qualifications for that role came from his early experience on the northern front of the French and Indian War. He was asked, along with Richard Butler and Arthur Lee, to negotiate a peace treaty with the Six Nations at Fort Schuyler.

He was elected to the Continental Congress in 1775. He became seriously ill in 1776 and did not sign the Declaration of Independence until some time later.

Beyond his postwar diplomatic role, Wolcott aspired to higher office. He was elected Lieutenant Governor of Connecticut as a Federalist in 1786 and served in that position for ten years. Wolcott became governor when Samuel Huntington died on January 5, 1796, holding the office until his own death at age 71. He also served as a judge of the Connecticut Supreme Court of Errors from 1784 until his death.

== Death and legacy ==
Wolcott died on December 1, 1797, in Litchfield, where he is interred at East Cemetery. Historian Ellsworth Grant remembers Wolcott's Revolutionary War efforts in stating that, "It is doubtful if any other official in Connecticut during this period carried so many public duties on his shoulders."

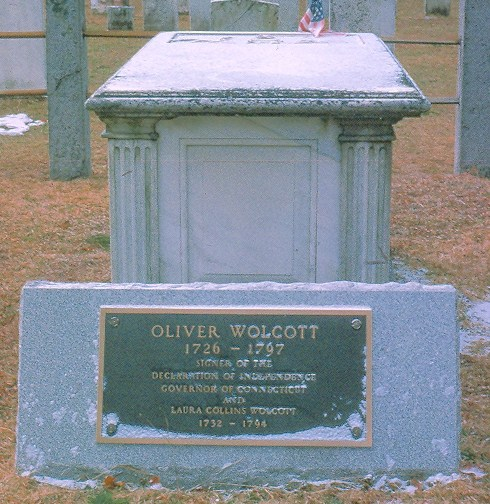
The grave of Oliver Wolcott Sr.

Oliver Wolcott Jr., his son, served as Secretary of the Treasury under Presidents George Washington and John Adams and as governor of Connecticut. His descendants include Congregationalist minister Samuel Wolcott, D.D.; Edward O. Wolcott, a United States Senator from Denver; Anna Wolcott Vaile, who established the Wolcott School for Girls in Denver; ethnologist George Gibbs; chemist Oliver Wolcott Gibbs; Brigadier General Alfred Gibbs; and mountaineer Roger Wolcott Toll.

The towns of Wolcott, Connecticut, and Wolcott, Vermont bear his name. In Torrington, Connecticut, there is a school named after him, The Oliver Wolcott Technical High School. His home in Litchfield was declared a National Historic Landmark in 1971. In 1798, Fort Washington on Goat Island in Newport, Rhode Island was renamed Fort Wolcott and was an active fortification until 1836; it later became the site of the United States Naval Torpedo Station.

== See also ==
- Oliver Wolcott House, Litchfield, Connecticut, Built 1753
- Memorial to the 56 Signers of the Declaration of Independence

== Bibliography ==
- "A Guide to the Oliver Wolcott, Sr. Papers, from 1638-1834." Connecticut Historical Society, 2016.
- Grant, Ellsworth. "From Governor to Governor In Three Generations," (The Connecticut Historical Society Bulletin, Volume 39 no.3, Hartford, July 1974), 65—77". Connecticut Historical Society Bulletin.
- Jensen, Merrill (1978). The Documentary History of the Ratification of the Constitution: Volume III Ratification of the Constitution by the States Delaware, New Jersey, Georgia and Connecticut. Madison: State Historical Society of Wisconsin.
- Mahoney, Patrick. "Soldier, Patriot, and Politician: The Life of Oliver Wolcott". Connecticut History.org. CThumanities.
- Stark, Bruce. "Oliver Wolcott". American National Biography Online.

Party political offices
Preceded by Samuel Huntington	Federalist nominee for Governor of Connecticut; 1796, 1797	Succeeded by Jonathan Trumbull Jr.
Political offices
Preceded by Samuel Huntington	Lieutenant Governor of Connecticut; 1786—1796	Succeeded by Jonathan Trumbull Jr.
Preceded by Samuel Huntington	Governor of Connecticut; 1796—1797	Succeeded by Jonathan Trumbull Jr.
